= List of Mont-Saint-Michel abbots =

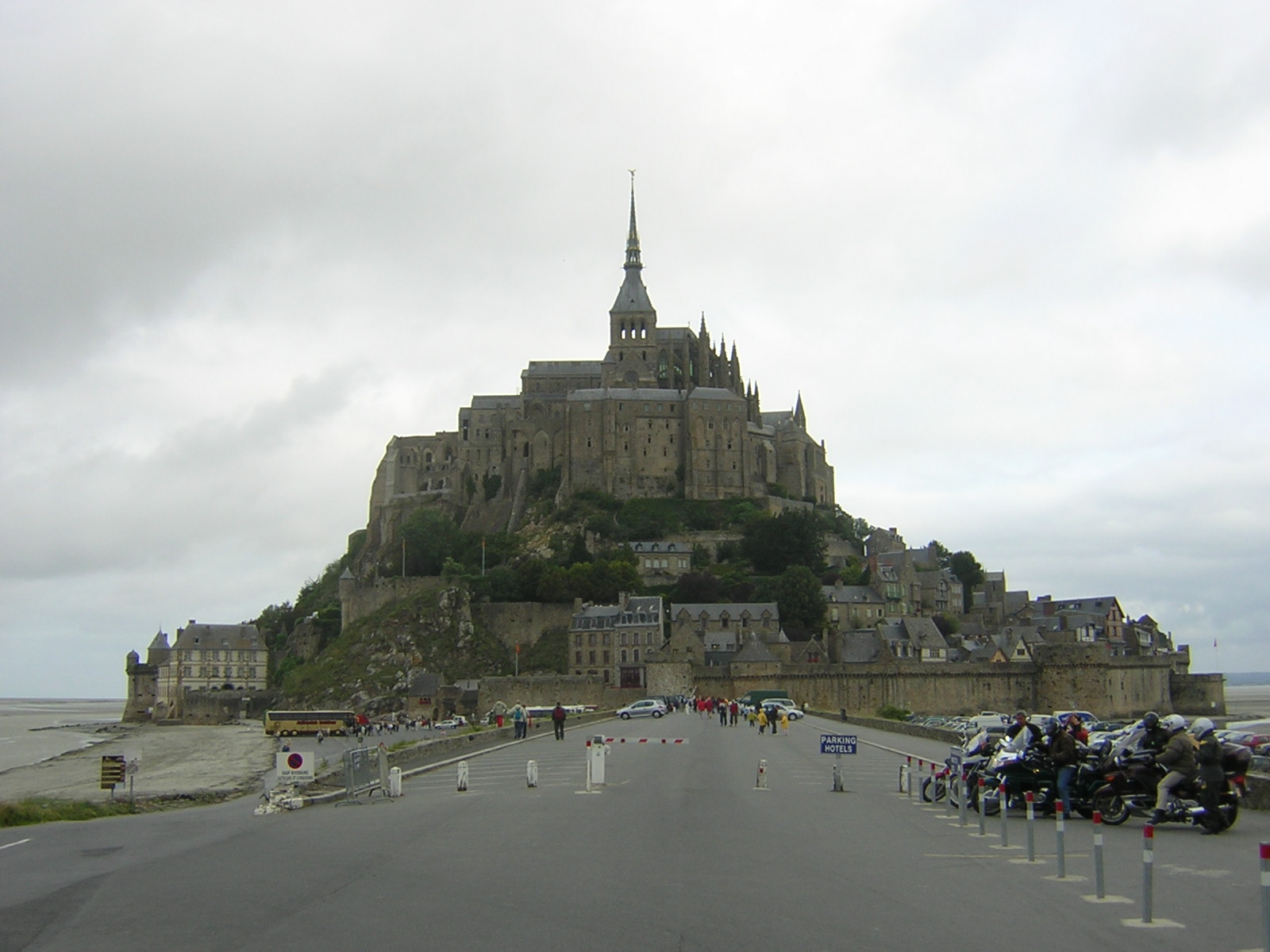

List of Mont-Saint-Michel abbey abbots, of the Benedict order, starting in 966 after the removal by Duke Richard I of Normandy of the previous order, present since 709, and originally funded by Saint Aubert of Avranches.

== 10th century ==
- 966 - 991 : Maynard I, 26th abbot of the Fontenelle then first Benedict abbot of the Mont;
- 991 - 1009 : Maynard II, nephew of his predecessor.

== 11th century ==
- 1009 - 1017 : Hildebert I, nominated by his predecessor
- 1017 - 1023 : Hildebert II, nephew of his predecessor
- 1024 - 1031 : Almod
- 1031 - 1033 : Théodoric
- 1033 - 1048 : Suppo, previous abbot of Fruttuaria (Italy), brother of his predecessor and nephew of Guillaume de Volpiano, abbot of Fécamp
- 1048 - 1060 : Raoul de Beaumont, monk of Fécamp
- 1063 - 1085 : Ranulphe de Bayeux
- 1085 - 1102 : Roger I, monk of Caen, former chaplain of Guillaume le Conquérant

== 12th century ==
- 1106 - 1122 : Roger II
- 1125 - 1131 : Richard de Mère
- 1131 - 1149 : Bernard du Bec
- 1149 - 1150 : Geoffroy
- 1151 - 1152 : Richard de La Mouche
- 1152 - 1154 : Robert Hardy
- 1154 - 1186 : Robert of Torigni, aka « Robert of the Mont »
- 1186 - 1191 : Martin de Furmendi

== 13th century ==
- 1191 - 1212 : Jordan du Mont
- 1212 - 1218 : Raoul des Isles
- 1218 - 1223 : Thomas des Chambres
- 1225 - 1236 : Raoul de Villedieu
- 1236 - 1264 : Richard Turstin
- 1264 - 1271 : Nicolas Alexandre
- 1271 - 1279 : Nicolas-François Famigot
- 1279 - 1280 : Ranulphe du Bourgay
- 1280 - 1298 : Jean Le Faë

== 14th century ==
- 1299 - 1314 : Guillaume du Château
- 1314 - 1334 : Jean de La Porte
- 1334 - 1362 : Nicolas Le Vitrier
- 1363 - 1386 : Geoffroy de Servon
- 1386 - 1410 : Pierre Le Roy, former abbot of Saint-Taurin d'Évreux, and of Lessay

== 15th century ==
- 1410 - 1444 : Robert Jollivet
- 1444 - 1483 : Guillaume d'Estouteville
- 1483 - 1499 : André Laure

== 16th century ==
- 1499 - 1510 : Guillaume de Lamps
- 1510 - 1513 : Guérin Laure
- 1515 - 1523 : Jean de Lamps
- 1524 - 1543 : Jean Le Veneur
- 1543 - 1558 : Jacques d'Annebault
- 1558 - 1570 : François Le Roux d'Anort
- 1570 - 1587 : Arthur de Cossé-Brissac

== 17th century ==
- 1588 - 1615 : François de Joyeuse
- 1615 - 1641 : Henri of Guise, Duke of Guise
- 1641 - 1643 : Jean Ruzé d'Effiat
- 1644 - 1670 : Jacques de Souvré
- 1670 - 1703 : Étienne Texier d'Hautefeuille

== 18th century ==
- 1703 - 1718 : Jean-Frédéric Karq de Bebembourg
- 1721 - 1766 : Charles-Maurice de Broglie
- 1766 - 1769 : Étienne-Charles de Loménie de Brienne
- 1788 - 1791 : Louis-Joseph de Montmorency-Laval

== See also ==
- Mont Saint Michel Abbey
