= Lisieux =

Subprefecture and commune in Normandy, France

- Subprefecture and commune
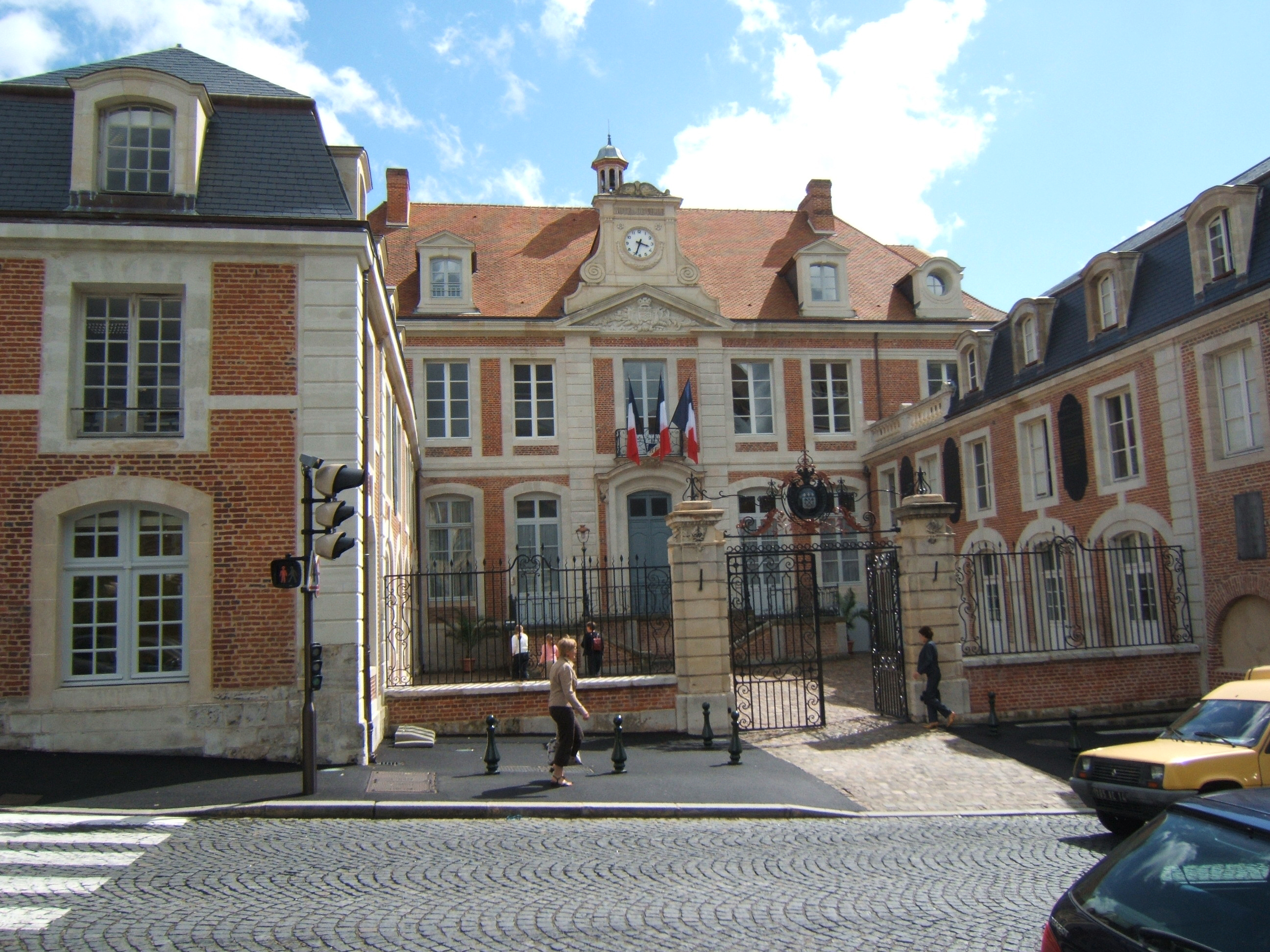
- The Hôtel de Ville

- Coat of arms
- Location of Lisieux
- Location within France Location within Normandy
- Coordinates: 49°09′N 0°14′E
- Country: France
- Region: Normandy
- Department: Calvados
- Arrondissement: Lisieux
- Canton: Lisieux
- Intercommunality: CA Lisieux Normandie

Government
  - Mayor (2020–2026): Sébastien Leclerc
- Area^{1}: 13.07 km^{2} (5.05 sq mi)
- Highest elevation: 152 m (499 ft)
- Lowest elevation: 32 m (105 ft)
- Population (2023): 19,645
  - Density: 1,503/km^{2} (3,893/sq mi)
- Demonym: Lexoviens
- Time zone: UTC+01:00 (CET)
  - Summer (DST): UTC+02:00 (CEST)
- INSEE/Postal code: 14366 /14100
- ^{1} French Land Register data, which excludes lakes, ponds, glaciers > 1 km^{2} (0.386 sq mi or 247 acres) and river estuaries.

Lisieux (French: [lizjø]) is a commune in the Calvados department in the Normandy region in northwestern France. It is the capital of the Pays d'Auge area, which is characterised by valleys and hedged farmland.

== Name ==
The name of the town derives from the Latin: Noviomagus Lexoviorum ("Noviomagus of the Lexovii"). The town was originally known in Celtic as Novio Magos ("New Field", "New Market"), which was Latinized as Noviomagus. Owing to the large number of similarly named cities, however, it was necessary to specify where this one was located. The local French demonym Lexoviens derives from the Latin as well.

== History ==
=== Antiquity ===
Lisieux was the capital of the Lexovii. In his work, Commentaries on the Gallic War, Caesar mentions a Gallic oppidum, a term which refers to Celtic towns located on the tops of hills. The oppidum has been pinpointed to a place referred to as le Castellier, located 3 kilometers (1.9 mi) to the southwest of the town. However the Gallo-Roman city was in fact located where Lisieux is to be found today.

=== Middle Ages ===
King Henry II of England was staying in Lisieux when he announced plans to marry Eleanor of Aquitaine in 1152, and the town remained powerful for several centuries afterwards. In the 14th century, the triple scourges of the Plague, war and resulting famine devastated Lisieux and reduced its influence. The main judge of Joan of Arc, Pierre Cauchon, became a bishop of Lisieux after Joan's death, and is buried in the Lady Chapel of the cathedral. Another celebrated bishop of Lisieux was philosopher Nicole Oresme.

=== Events ===
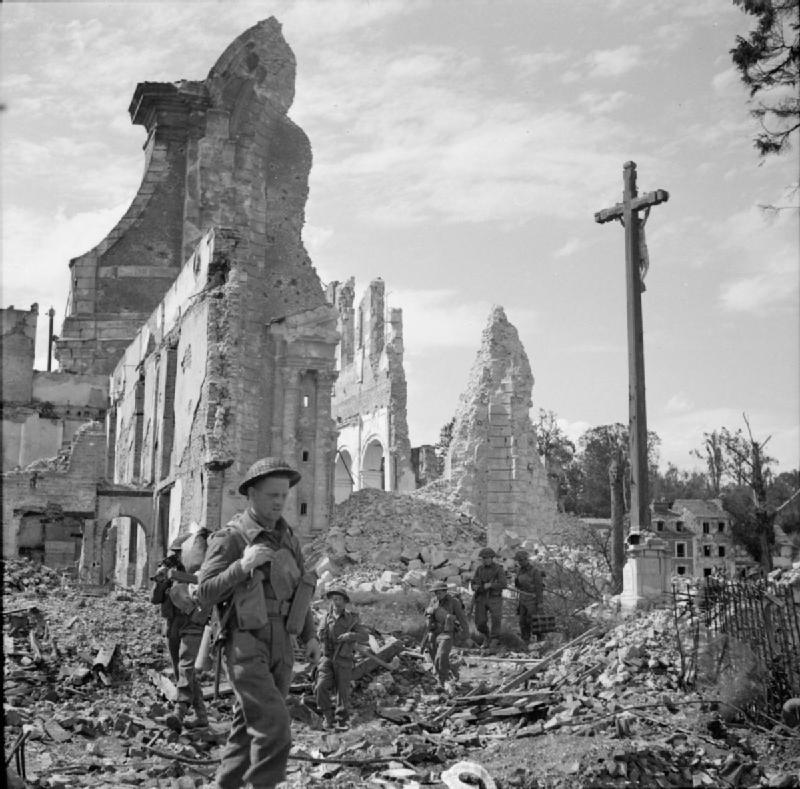
Lisieux during the Second World War

- 4th century: Presence of the Germanic laeti, auxiliaries of the Roman Army, who settled in Lisieux with their families. Their graves have been discovered in the “Michelet” necropolis, some of which contain artefacts typical of northern Germania.
- 1432: Pierre Cauchon, the supreme judge during the trial of Joan of Arc at Rouen became the bishop of Lisieux. He commissioned the building of the side chapel of the cathedral, in which he is now buried.
- 1590: During the Eighth War of Religion, Henri IV had to fight to win back his kingdom. When he arrived at Lisieux he took the town without force, after the garrison had fled the town.
- 1897: Sister Thérèse of the Child Jesus of the Holy Face, died in the Carmelite monastery at Lisieux. In 1925, she would be canonized as "St. Thérèse of Lisieux".
- 1907: The first helicopter flight, piloted by Paul Cornu.
- 1937: Monseigneur Eugenio Pacelli, papal legate and future Pope Pius XII, visited Lisieux.
- 6/7 June 1944: An Allied bombardment killed 800 people and destroyed two thirds of the town.
- 23 August 1944: Liberation by the Allied troops.
- 1960: Lisieux merged with the Saint-Jacques commune.
- 2 June 1980: Pope John-Paul II visited Lisieux.

== Geography ==
Lisieux is situated on the confluence of the river Touques and many of its tributaries: the rivers Orbiquet, Cirieux and Graindain.

The town is in the heart of the Pays d'Auge, of which it is the capital. Lisieux is therefore surrounded by Normandy's typical hedged farmland, where there is a mix of livestock farming (mostly milk cows) and cider apple cultivation (from which cider and calvados are made, not forgetting pommeau).

=== Climate ===
Lisieux has a temperate oceanic humid climate.

Climate data for Lisieux (1994–2020 normals, extremes 1994-present)
| Month | Jan | Feb | Mar | Apr | May | Jun | Jul | Aug | Sep | Oct | Nov | Dec | Year |
|---|---|---|---|---|---|---|---|---|---|---|---|---|---|
| Record high °C (°F) | 17.5 (63.5) | 21.3 (70.3) | 26.1 (79.0) | 28.4 (83.1) | 31.8 (89.2) | 37.7 (99.9) | 40.5 (104.9) | 40.0 (104.0) | 34.3 (93.7) | 29.4 (84.9) | 23.1 (73.6) | 17.6 (63.7) | 40.5 (104.9) |
| Mean daily maximum °C (°F) | 8.5 (47.3) | 9.7 (49.5) | 12.6 (54.7) | 15.9 (60.6) | 18.9 (66.0) | 22.2 (72.0) | 24.3 (75.7) | 24.2 (75.6) | 21.4 (70.5) | 17.1 (62.8) | 12.2 (54.0) | 9.0 (48.2) | 16.3 (61.3) |
| Daily mean °C (°F) | 5.5 (41.9) | 6.0 (42.8) | 8.1 (46.6) | 10.4 (50.7) | 13.6 (56.5) | 16.7 (62.1) | 18.6 (65.5) | 18.5 (65.3) | 15.8 (60.4) | 12.7 (54.9) | 8.6 (47.5) | 6.0 (42.8) | 11.7 (53.1) |
| Mean daily minimum °C (°F) | 2.4 (36.3) | 2.3 (36.1) | 3.5 (38.3) | 4.9 (40.8) | 8.3 (46.9) | 11.2 (52.2) | 13.0 (55.4) | 12.8 (55.0) | 10.2 (50.4) | 8.2 (46.8) | 5.1 (41.2) | 2.9 (37.2) | 7.1 (44.8) |
| Record low °C (°F) | −12.0 (10.4) | −14.8 (5.4) | −9.3 (15.3) | −5.0 (23.0) | −1.0 (30.2) | 3.0 (37.4) | 0.0 (32.0) | 5.0 (41.0) | 0.2 (32.4) | −7.0 (19.4) | −7.0 (19.4) | −11.0 (12.2) | −14.8 (5.4) |
| Average precipitation mm (inches) | 82.2 (3.24) | 69.3 (2.73) | 64.2 (2.53) | 62.1 (2.44) | 65.5 (2.58) | 67.9 (2.67) | 56.4 (2.22) | 66.4 (2.61) | 68.5 (2.70) | 85.6 (3.37) | 87.2 (3.43) | 106.1 (4.18) | 881.4 (34.70) |
| Average precipitation days (≥ 1.0 mm) | 13.6 | 12.0 | 11.0 | 10.3 | 10.0 | 9.3 | 9.3 | 9.4 | 9.7 | 12.5 | 13.7 | 14.8 | 135.6 |
Source: Meteociel

=== Transport ===
The town of Lisieux is served by a bus network called Lexobus, with 6 routes. The town is also linked to surrounding towns and villages by a network of buses; Bus Verts du Calvados. The main railway station, Lisieux station, which is the connecting station between the Paris-Cherbourg and Paris-Trouville/Deauville main lines, is served by Transport express régional (regional express) trains on the TER Normandie routes. The station appeared in the film Un singe en hiver by Henri Verneuil. There is another station on the line to Deauville: Le Grand-Jardin station.

To reach the town by car, the D613 (formerly route nationale 13) from Paris to Cherbourg crosses the town from east to west. The second main road serving Lisieux is the D579, leading to Deauville to the north and the department of Orne to the south. Lisieux benefits from a bypass, built in the 1990s, running to the south of the town, easing traffic in the town-centre, particularly on boulevard Sainte-Anne.

=== Religion ===
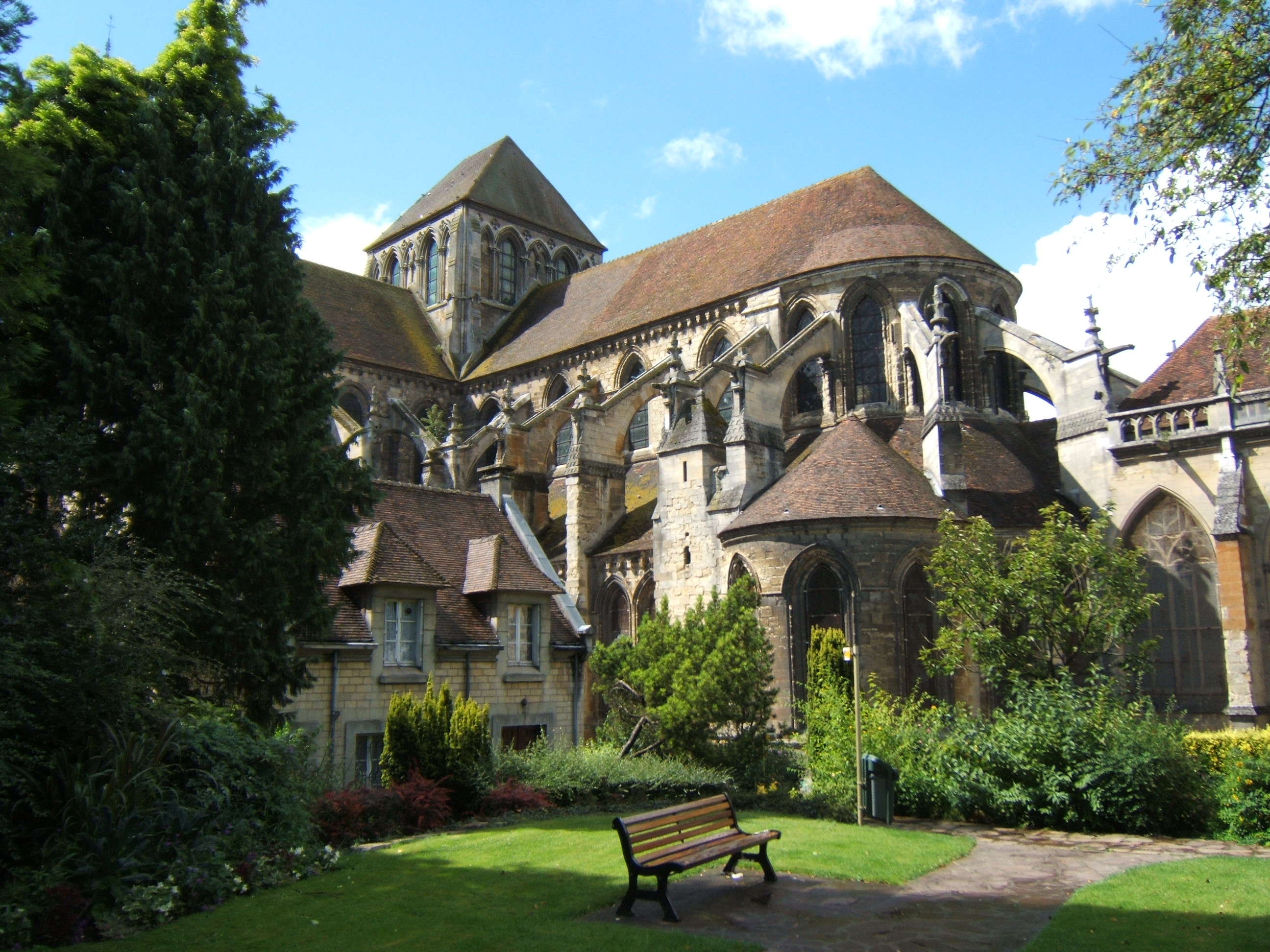
Lisieux Cathedral

Since the Middle Ages Lisieux has been the seat of one of the seven Roman Catholic dioceses of Normandy under the jurisdiction of the ecclesiastical province of Rouen. The bishopric was abolished in 1801 before being recreated and merged with that of Bayeux in 1855, under the new name of "Bayeux and Lisieux".

The best-known of the Bishops of Lisieux is Pierre Cauchon, who had a decisive influence during the trial of Joan of Arc. He is buried in Lisieux Cathedral.

Devotion to Sainte-Thérèse also known as St. Teresa of the Child Jesus who lived in the nearby Carmelite convent has made Lisieux France's second-most important site of pilgrimage, after the Pyrenean town of Lourdes. Sainte-Thérèse de Lisieux died in 1897, she was canonized in 1925 and named a doctor of the church by Pope John Paul II in 1997.

== Administration ==
=== Mayors of Lisieux ===
List of everyone who has held the position of Mayor of Lisieux:

List of mayors
| Term | | Name | Party | Profession |
|---|---|---|---|---|
| 2020 | incumbent | Sébastien Leclerc | | |
| March 2001 | 2020 | Bernard Aubril | UMP | Teacher |
| 1989 | 2001 | Yvette Roudy | PS | |
| 1977 | 1989 | André-Eugène Baugé | | |
| 1953 | 1977 | Robert Bisson | | |
| 1945 | 1953 | André Carles | | |
| 1945 | | Casimir Hue | | |
| 1936 | 1945 | Albert Degrenne | | |
| 1932 | 1936 | Henry Chéron | | Lawyer |
| 1909 | 1932 | Arthur Lesigne | | |
| 1908 | 1909 | Joseph Guillonneau | | |
| 1894 | 1908 | Henry Chéron | | Lawyer |
| 1881 | 1894 | Théodule Peulevey | | Industrialist |
| 1878 | 1881 | Louis Michel | | |
| 1875 | 1878 | Léopold Frauque | | |
| 1871 | 1875 | Jules Prat | | |
| 1853 | 1871 | François Fauque | | |
| 1848 | 1853 | Victor Godefroy | | |
| 1847 | 1848 | Jean-Lambert Fournet | | Industrialist |
| 1842 | 1847 | Adrien-Benjamin Formeville | | |
| 1832 | 1842 | François-Pierre Leroy-Beaulieu | | |
| 1816 | 1832 | Joseph-François de Bellemare | | |
| 1813 | 1816 | Jean-Jacques Nasse | | |
| 1808 | 1813 | Louis-Jacques-Hippolyte Thillaye du Boullay | | |
| 1798 | 1808 | Jean-Jacques Nasse | | |
| 1797 | | Guillaume-François Riquier | | |
| 1796 | | Pierre Lerebours | | |
| 1795 | | Jean-Baptiste Vergé | | |
| 1795 | | Michel Bloche | | |
| 1794 | | Jean Coessin | | |
| 1793 | | Louis-Jean-René Prieur | | |
| 1792 | | Michel Bloche | | |
| 1791 | | Thomas Gannel | | |
| 1790 | | François-Pierre Leroy-Beaulieu | | |

=== International relations ===
Lisieux is twinned with:

- Taunton (United Kingdom) – since 1951;
- Saint-Georges, Quebec (Canada) – since 1996
- Saint-Jérôme, Quebec (Canada) – since 2010
- Mogliano Veneto (Italy)

== Population ==
Lisieux is Calvados' third largest commune in terms of population, after Caen and Hérouville-Saint-Clair. Its functional urban area of 55,168 inhabitants is the second largest of the department, after Caen. The inhabitants of Lisieux are known as Lexoviens in French.

Historical population

| Year | Pop. | ±% p.a. |
|---|---|---|
| 1793 | 10,118 | — |
| 1800 | 10,171 | +0.07% |
| 1806 | 10,937 | +1.22% |
| 1821 | 10,403 | −0.33% |
| 1831 | 10,257 | −0.14% |
| 1836 | 11,473 | +2.27% |
| 1841 | 11,378 | −0.17% |
| 1846 | 11,968 | +1.02% |
| 1851 | 11,754 | −0.36% |
| 1856 | 12,993 | +2.02% |
| 1861 | 13,121 | +0.20% |
| 1866 | 12,617 | −0.78% |
| 1872 | 18,341 | +6.43% |
| 1876 | 18,396 | +0.07% |
| 1881 | 16,039 | −2.70% |
| 1886 | 16,267 | +0.28% |
| 1891 | 16,260 | −0.01% |
| 1896 | 16,349 | +0.11% |
| 1901 | 16,084 | −0.33% |

| Year | Pop. | ±% p.a. |
|---|---|---|
| 1906 | 16,239 | +0.19% |
| 1911 | 15,948 | −0.36% |
| 1921 | 15,341 | −0.39% |
| 1926 | 15,192 | −0.20% |
| 1931 | 15,362 | +0.22% |
| 1936 | 16,032 | +0.86% |
| 1946 | 12,746 | −2.27% |
| 1954 | 15,342 | +2.34% |
| 1962 | 21,156 | +4.10% |
| 1968 | 23,830 | +2.00% |
| 1975 | 25,521 | +0.98% |
| 1982 | 24,940 | −0.33% |
| 1990 | 23,703 | −0.63% |
| 1999 | 23,166 | −0.25% |
| 2007 | 22,700 | −0.25% |
| 2012 | 21,170 | −1.39% |
| 2017 | 20,318 | −0.82% |
| 2023 | 19,645 | −0.56% |

Source: EHESS and INSEE

== Sights ==
About 60 percent of the town was destroyed in 1944, so few of the monuments have been preserved.

=== Basilica of Sainte-Thérèse de Lisieux ===
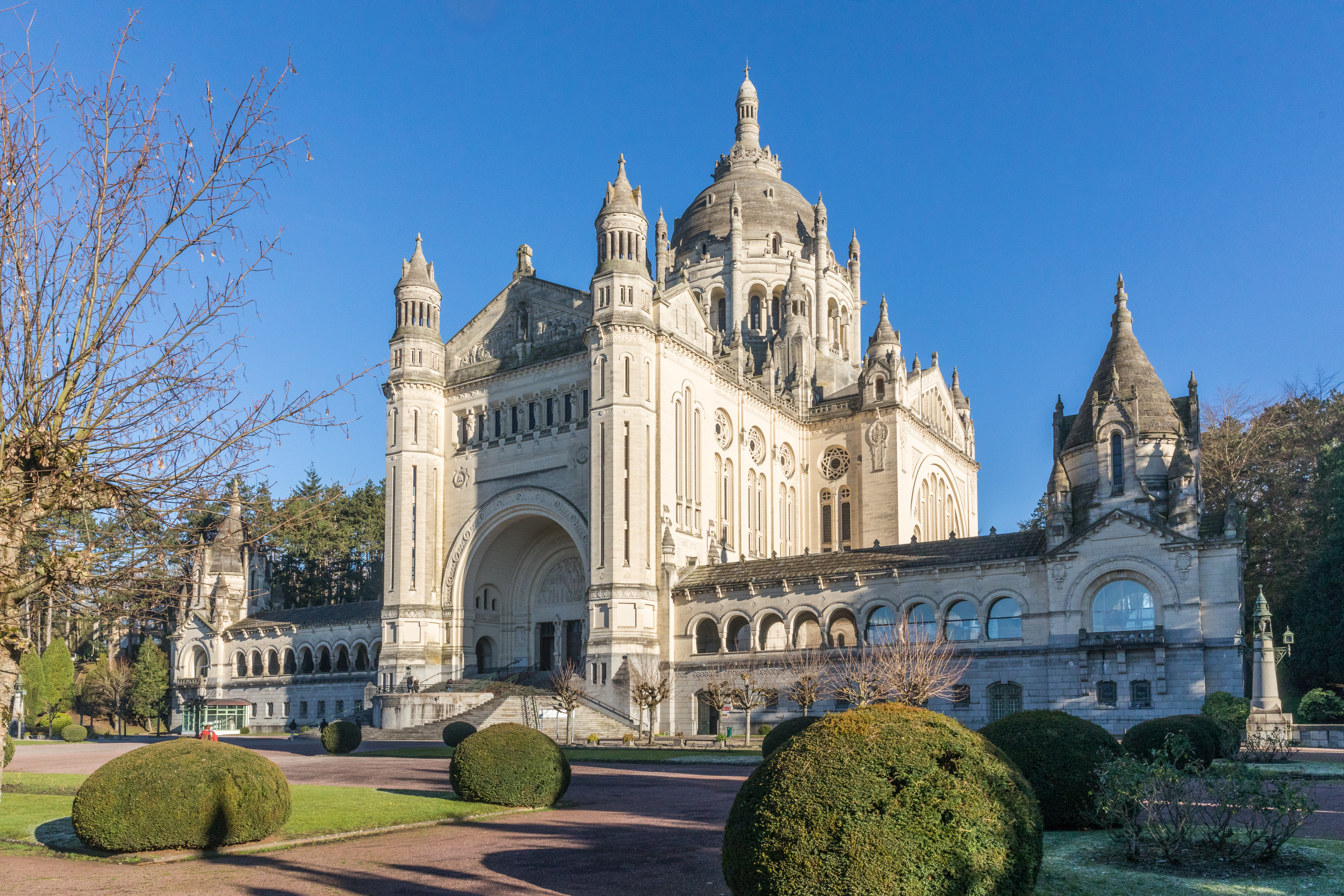
Basilica of Sainte-Thérèse de Lisieux

The Basilica of Sainte-Thérèse de Lisieux was constructed in honour of Sainte-Thérèse de Lisieux, who was beatified in 1923 and canonized in 1925. It was built for pilgrims who came in increasing numbers to venerate the new saint in the town where she had lived and died.

=== Carmel of Lisieux ===
It is possible to visit the chapel and exterior of the Carmel or monastery where Thérèse lived, but the remainder of the building is closed to visitors.

=== Château de Saint-Germain-de-Livet ===
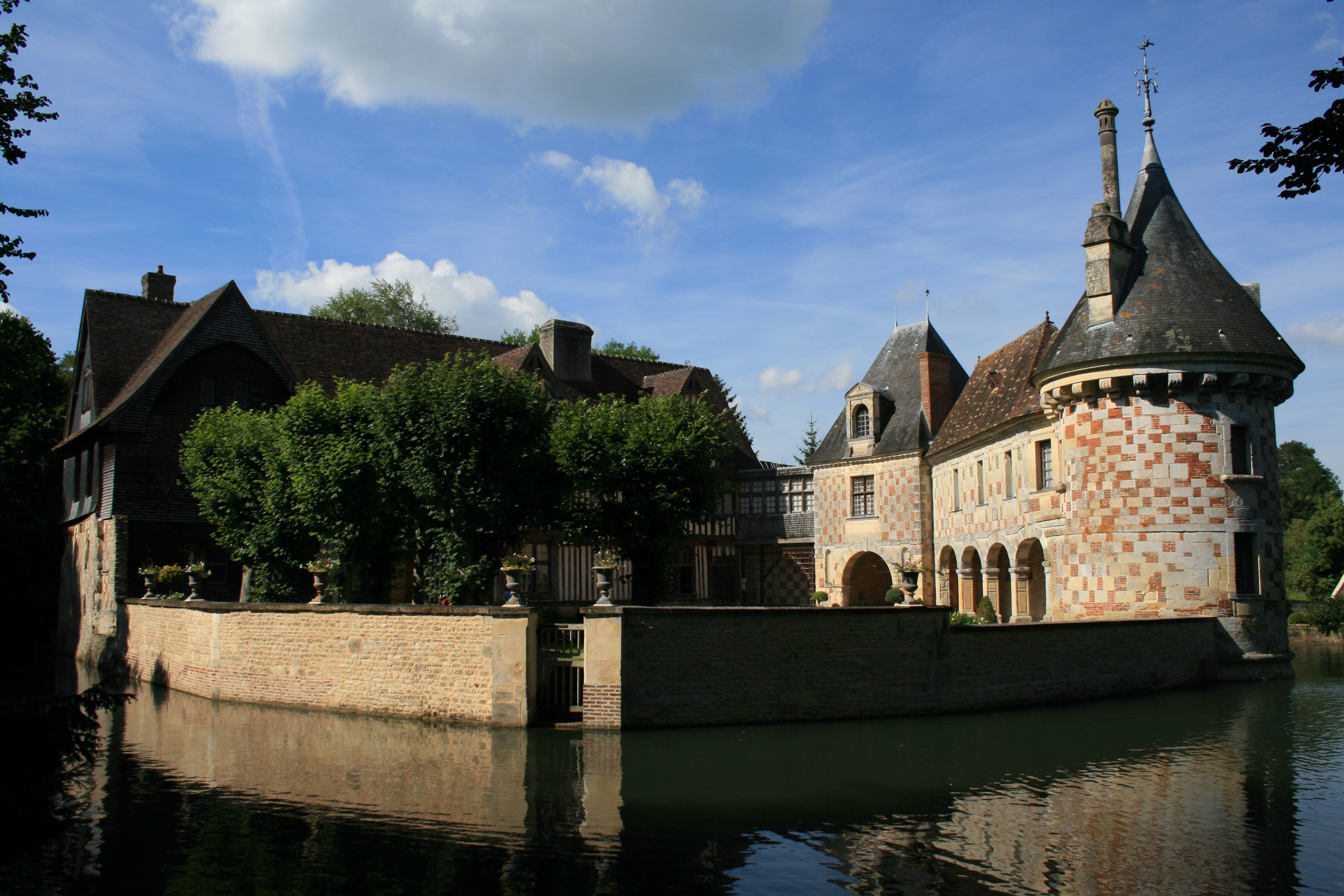
Château de Saint-Germain-de-Livet from the south

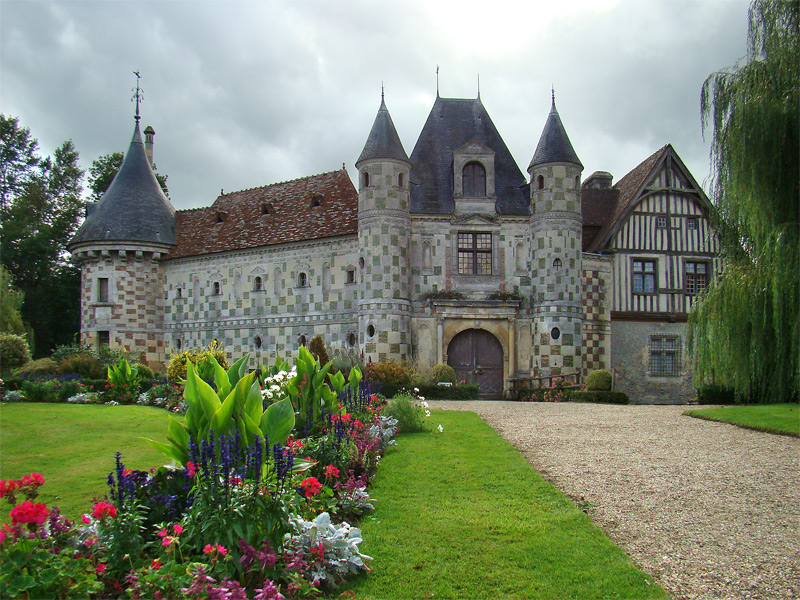
Château de Saint-Germain-de-Livet from the entrance

As its name indicates, the Château de Saint-Germain-de-Livet is situated in the commune of Saint-Germain-de-Livet. It is to be found opposite the village church which dates from the 19th century. The château has been owned by the town of Lisieux since 1958 when it was donated by the Riesener family.

From an architectural point of view the château comprises a half-timbered manor dating from the 15th century and a glazed brick and stone building from the Pré-d'Auge dating from the end of the 16th century.

The chateau combines medieval and Renaissance elements and is surrounded by a moat and a peacock garden.

=== Lisieux Cathedral ===
Lisieux Cathedral (Cathédrale Saint-Pierre) is a rare monument which survived the 1944 allied bombardment. Even though the cathedral has been around since the 6th century, the church of today must have been constructed between 1160 and 1230 by Bishop Arnoul.

From the outset, the architect designed quadripartite rib vaults and flying buttresses, making it one of Normandy's first Gothic buildings. The nave is fairly austere and is inspired by the Gothic style of the Île de France, whereas the most recent parts of the building were constructed in the 18th century (the chevet, the lantern tower and the western façade) in Norman style.

It is wrongly claimed that Henry Plantagenet, Count of Anjou, Duke of Normandy and future king of England, married Eleanor of Aquitaine at the cathedral in 1152; they married in Poitiers Cathedral. Having been involved in the trial of Joan of Arc, Pierre Cauchon was named as Bishop of Lisieux in 1432 and is buried there.

=== The Hôtel de Ville ===
The Hôtel de Ville, which was formerly a private residence, was completed in 1713.

=== Bishop's Garden ===
French formal garden of the former Bishop's residence, designed by Andre le Notre, recreated in 1837.

== Sport ==
Lisieux has a football club CA Lisieux who play at the Stade Louis-Bielman.

== Notable people ==
Births

- Jean-Baptiste Laumonier (1749–1818), surgeon
- Thomas de Frondeville (1750–1816), politician
- Yves Leopold Germain Gaston (1803–1863), Sugar production pioneer, known as the "Father of the Sugar Industry" in the Philippines
- Paul-Louis Target (1821–1908), politician
- Henry Chéron (1867–1936), mayor of Lisieux (1894–1908; 1932–1936), and several times a minister under the French Third Republic
- Raymond Lantier (1886–1980), archaeologist
- Jean Derode (1887–1918), World War I flying ace and military hero
- Jean Charles Contel (1895–1928), painter
- Robert Accard (1897 -1971), French international footballer
- Michel Magne (1930–1984), composer (film music)
- Hervé Lemonnier (1947–), rally driver
- Thierry Moreau (1967-), professional footballer
- Matthieu Lagrive (1979–), endurance motorbike rider
- Maxime Laisney (1981–), politician
- Nicolas Batum (1988–), a professional basketball player playing with the Philadelphia 76ers of the National Basketball Association
- Thomas Heurtaux (1988–), footballer
- Chloé Mortaud (1989–), elected Miss France in 2009, lived in Lisieux until she was ten.
- Marine Johannès (1995-), a professional basketball player for the New York Liberty of the WNBA and Lyon Asvel Féminin

Deaths

- Sainte-Thérèse de Lisieux (1873–1897) Carmelite nun, later canonised as a Saint of the Catholic Church
- Paul Cornu (1881 – 1944) a French engineer.
- César Ruminski (1924–2009), international footballer
- Yvonne Ziegler (1902–1988) French resistance fighter, artist

== Photo gallery ==
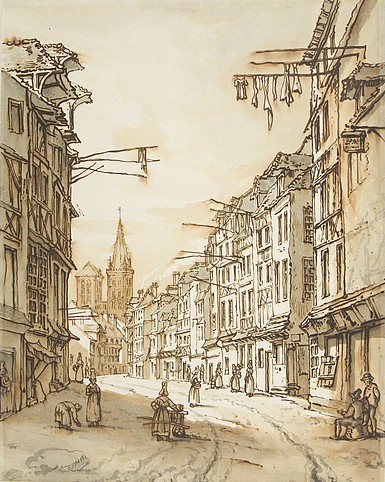
"Street in Lisieux" by Henry Edridge

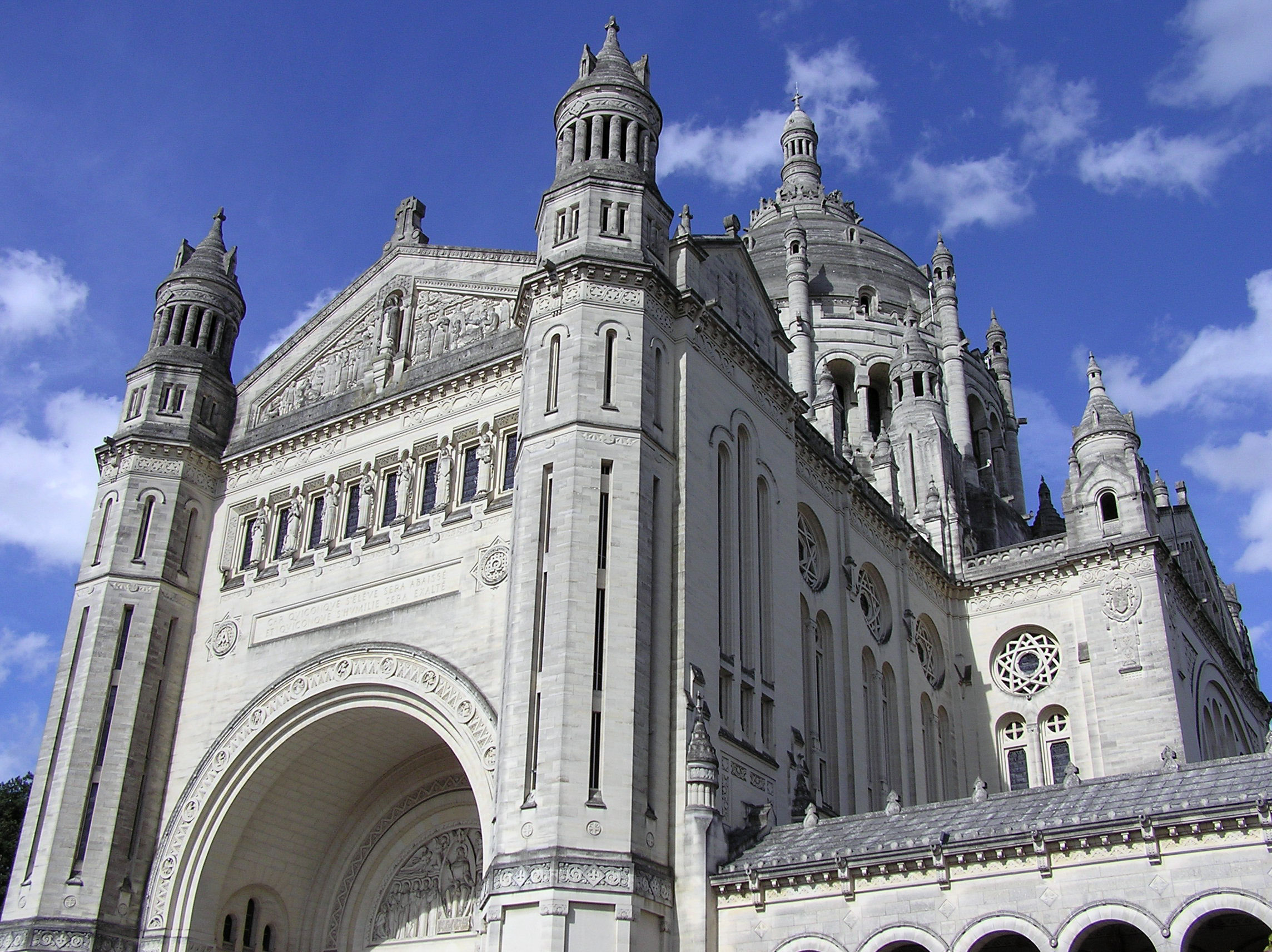
Basilique de Sainte-Thérèse

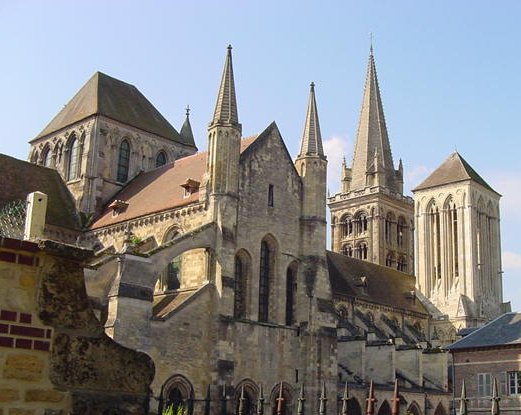
Lisieux Cathedral

== See also ==
- Bishopric of Lisieux
- Communes of the Calvados department
- Georges Vérez, sculptor of Lisieux War Memorial
- Gallo-Roman Theater of Lisieux
- Votive Column of Lisieux
