= Ralph de Warneville =

- Bishop of Lisieux
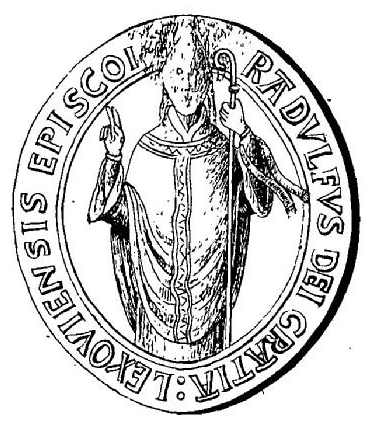
- See: Diocese of Lisieux
- Appointed: July 1181
- Predecessor: Arnulf of Lisieux
- Successor: William of Rupière
- Other posts: Treasurer of Rouen; Archdeacon of Rouen

Personal details
- Died: 10 September 1191
- Denomination: Catholic

Lord Chancellor
- In office 1173–1181
- Monarch: Henry II of England
- Preceded by: Geoffrey Ridel
- Succeeded by: Geoffrey

Ralph de Warneville (died 1191; sometimes Ralph de Varneville or Ralf of Wanneville) was the twentieth Lord Chancellor of England as well as later Bishop of Lisieux in Normandy.

Ralph was probably from Varneville aux Grès in Normandy, from which he derived his name. (Note: However, the village of Varneville aux Grès (now Varneville-Bretteville) had a different name in the 12th century. The village is really known as Wattnevilla or Watnevilla in 1050 - 1060, and then Wadnevilla in the 12th century and Wasnevilla in 1192 - 1198)

Ralph became Treasurer of Rouen sometime between 11 July 1146, the last appearance of his predecessor in office, and 27 September 1146 when Ralph is named as treasurer for the first time. He held the office of treasurer until 1176. He acquired the office of Archdeacon of Rouen in 1170, holding the office along with the treasurership of Rouen for a few years. (Note: The historian David Spear contradicts himself in Personnel of the Norman Cathedrals on when Ralph quit the treasurership of Rouen. On page 214 when discussing the archdeacons of Rouen, he states about Ralph that "by 1172 he seems to have given up the treasurership", but on page 219, discussing the treasurers of Rouen, he states that the last occurrence of Ralph as treasurer was in 1176.) After he left the treasurership, Ralph was accused by the cathedral chapter of Rouen of misusing some of the funds of the cathedral, and the dispute dragged on until 1188, when it was heard by a papal commission.

Ralph also held offices in England. He was Treasurer of York from 1167 until 1181, and was Archdeacon of the East Riding at about the same time. Ralph served King Henry II of England as Lord Chancellor from 1173 to 1181.

Ralph was a friend of Arnulf of Lisieux, Bishop of Lisieux, and benefited from Arnulf's intercession with the Bishop of Poitiers. But during Ralph's chancellorship, Ralph was one of the royal officials that urged Arnulf to resign his bishopric. Arnulf was suspected by King Henry of supporting Henry's sons in their Revolt of 1173–74, and eventually Arnulf was forced to resign his see. Ralph also had custody of the castle and royal lands at Vaudreuil in Normandy in the 1180s, and was still owing accounts for his administration at his death.

Ralph was appointed Bishop of Lisieux in July 1181, after his resignation from the office of Chancellor. He was not consecrated until after 1182, as he was still being recorded as bishop-elect then.

Ralph died on 10 September 1191, as his death was commemorated on 10 September at St Evroul.

== Citations ==
Political offices
Preceded by Geoffrey Ridel	Lord Chancellor; 1173–1181	Succeeded by Geoffrey
Catholic Church titles
Preceded by Arnulf of Lisieux	Bishop of Lisieux; 1181–1191	Succeeded by William of Rupière
