= Pertain =

- Part of Hypercourt
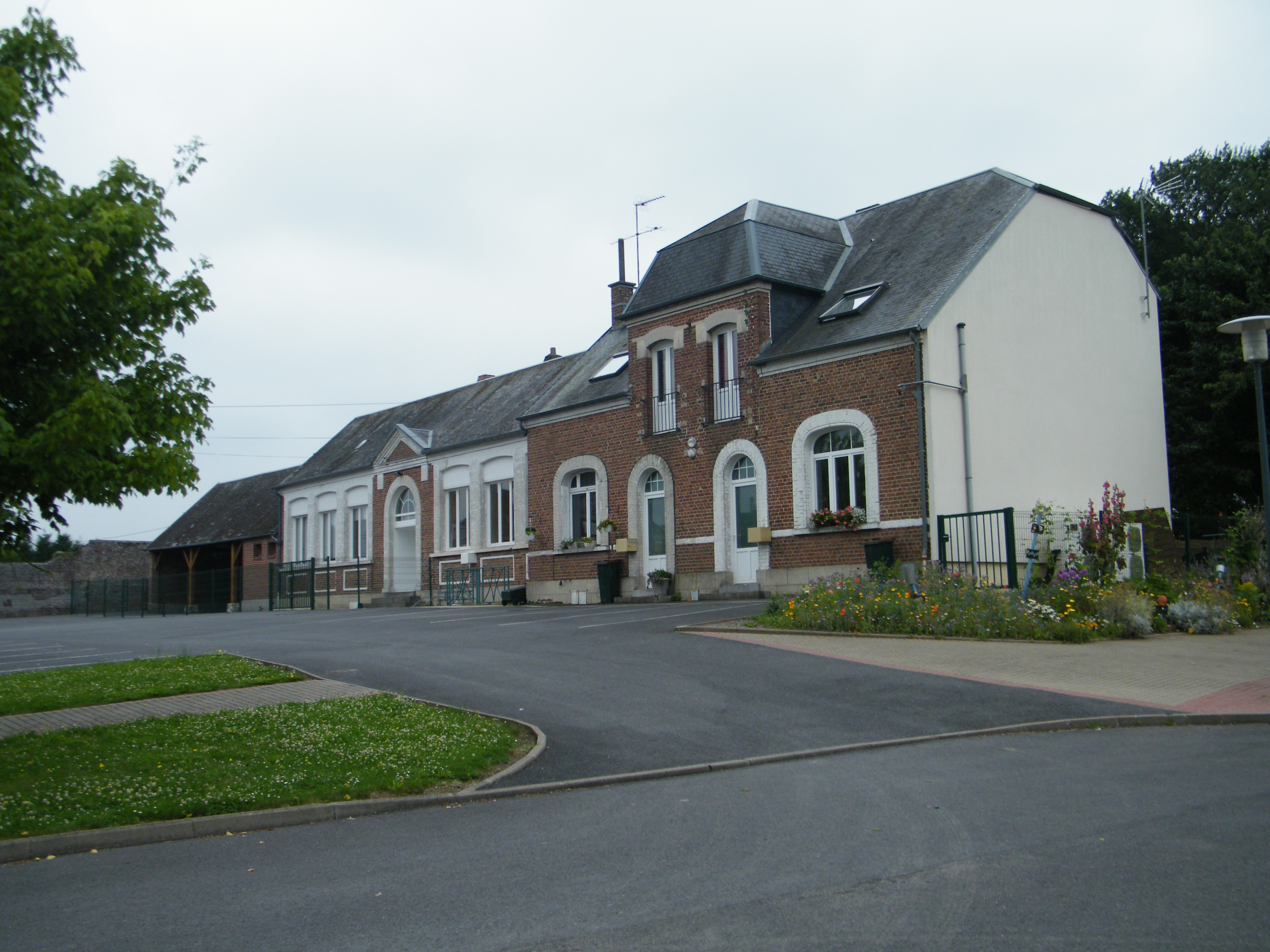
- Pertain Town hall
- Location of Pertain
- Location within France Location within Hauts-de-France
- Coordinates: 49°48′42″N 2°52′11″E
- Country: France
- Region: Hauts-de-France
- Department: Somme
- Arrondissement: Péronne
- Canton: Ham
- Commune: Hypercourt
- Area^{1}: 7.88 km^{2} (3.04 sq mi)
- Elevation: 100 m (330 ft)
- Highest elevation: 91 m (299 ft)
- Lowest elevation: 79 m (259 ft)
- Population (2021): 364
  - Density: 46.2/km^{2} (120/sq mi)
- Time zone: UTC+01:00 (CET)
  - Summer (DST): UTC+02:00 (CEST)
- Postal code: 80320
- ^{1} French Land Register data, which excludes lakes, ponds, glaciers > 1 km^{2} (0.386 sq mi or 247 acres) and river estuaries.

Pertain (French pronunciation: [pɛʁtɛ̃]) is a former commune in the Somme department in Hauts-de-France in northern France. On 1 January 2017, it was merged into the new commune Hypercourt.

== Geography ==
Pertain is situated on the D142 road, some 27 miles (43 km) southeast of Amiens, in the east of the Santerre district.

== Population ==
Historical population
Year	Pop.	±% p.a.
2006	358	—
2011	385	+1.46%
2021	364	−0.56%
Source: INSEE

== History ==
Founded around the end of the first millennium, the village was first known as "Pertaing". Made up of several now-disappeared hamlets, such as "Mory", "Sacy-Les-Pertain" and “Berseaucourt”.

== Places of interest ==
- Modern church of Saint Rémy
- War memorial
- Pigeon houses from the 1950s
- Vestiges of Gallo-Roman villas
- The foundations of a medieval manor house.

== See also ==
- Communes of the Somme department
