= Ancient Diocese of Lisieux =

Roman Catholic diocese in France (? - 1801)

Coordinates: 49.15°N 0.23°E

Diocese of Lisieux

catholic
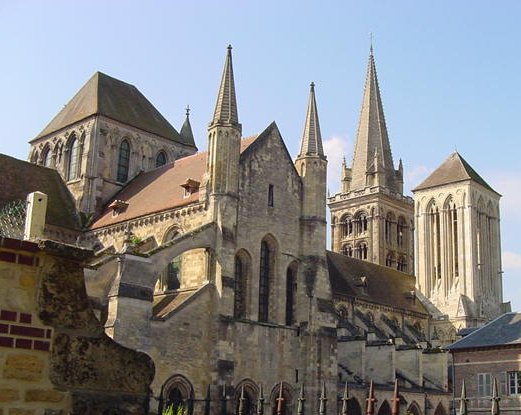
- Lisieux Cathedral

Information
- Established: ?
- Dissolved: 1802
- Cathedral: Cathedral of Saint Pierre, Lisieux

Map
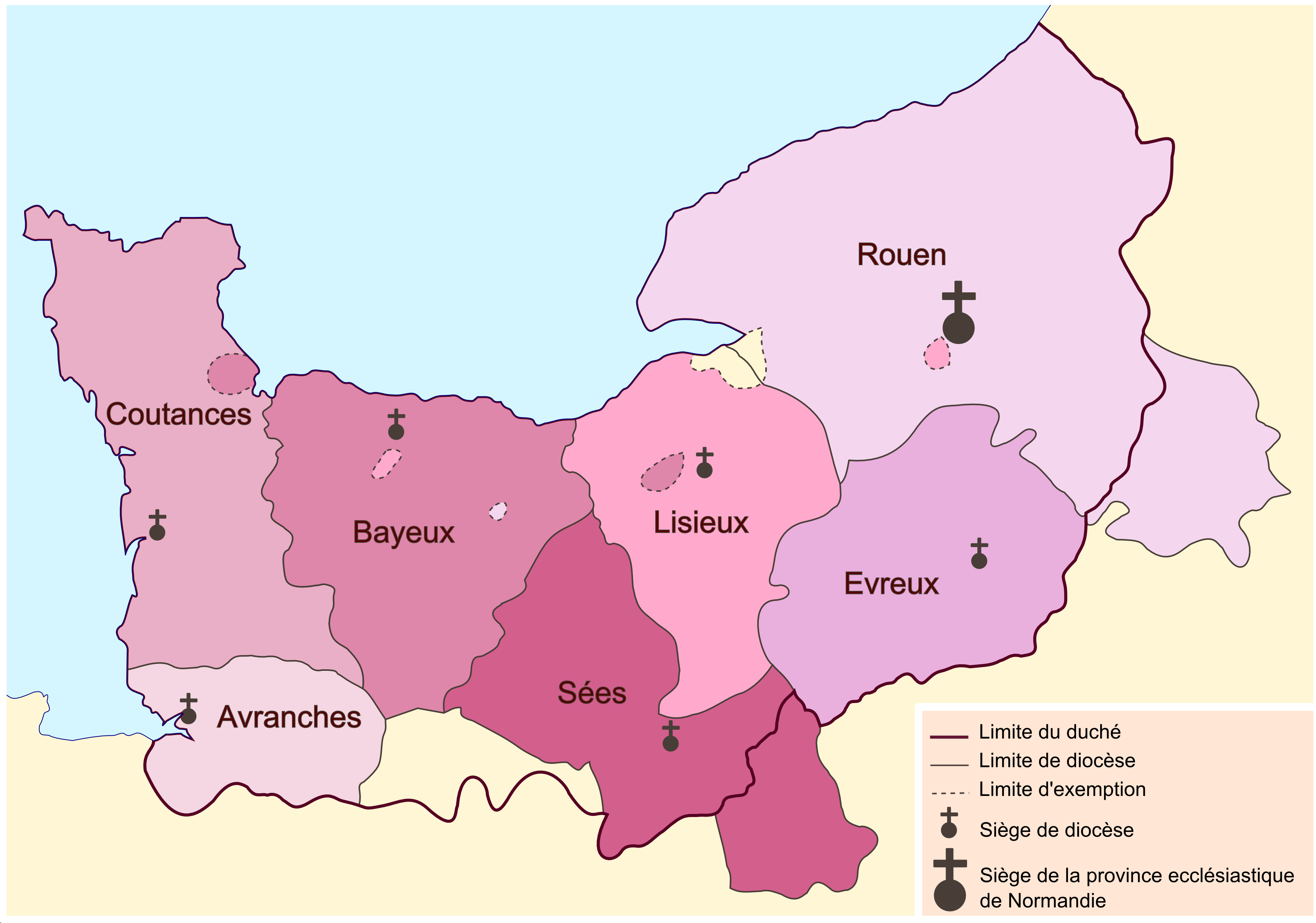
- The ecclesiastic provinces of Normandy before 1802. The diocese of Lisieux is in the center in pink.

The Diocese of Lisieux was a Roman Catholic ecclesiastical territory in France, centered on Lisieux, in Calvados. The bishop of Lisieux was the Ordinary of the Roman Catholic Diocese of Lisieux. The bishopric was suppressed during the French Revolution and was not reinstated. Present-day Lisieux is part of the Diocese of Bayeux.

== History ==
=== Early history ===
A list of alleged early bishops of Lisieux was included in the Ritual of Lisieux, published in 1661 under the direction of Bishop Léonor (I) Goyon de Matignon. The list, however, was padded with the names of saints whose putative relics were stored in the cathedral. These included Saint Ursinus, Saint Patrick and Saint Cande, none of whom can be shown to have been a bishop.

The first known Bishop of Lisieux is one Theodibandes, mentioned in connection with a council held in 538.

=== Middle Ages ===
A synod was held at Lisieux in 1055 by the Papal Legate, Bishop Hermanfried of Sion, with the cooperation of Duke William d'Eu, the illegitimate son of Richard I of Normandy, in which Archbishop Malgerius of Rouen was deposed. His dissolute life was notorious, he had refused to attend a Roman Council though summoned, and he made rebellion against the Duke. The deposition had already been agreed to by Pope Leo IX.

In the middle of October 1106, King Henry I of England visited Lisieux, where he held an assembly of the leading figures of the duchy of Normandy, both lay and ecclesiastical. He dealt with the disorders which had been caused by his brother Duke Robert, taking hostages (who were sent to England) including Robert, and condemning to imprisonment for life Count Guillaume Werlenc of Mortain, Robert d'Estouteville, and several others. In 1136, the cathedral was burned by Geoffrey of Anjou. Under Arnulf of Lisieux essential repairs were conducted before it was then completely rebuild from 1160 onwards.

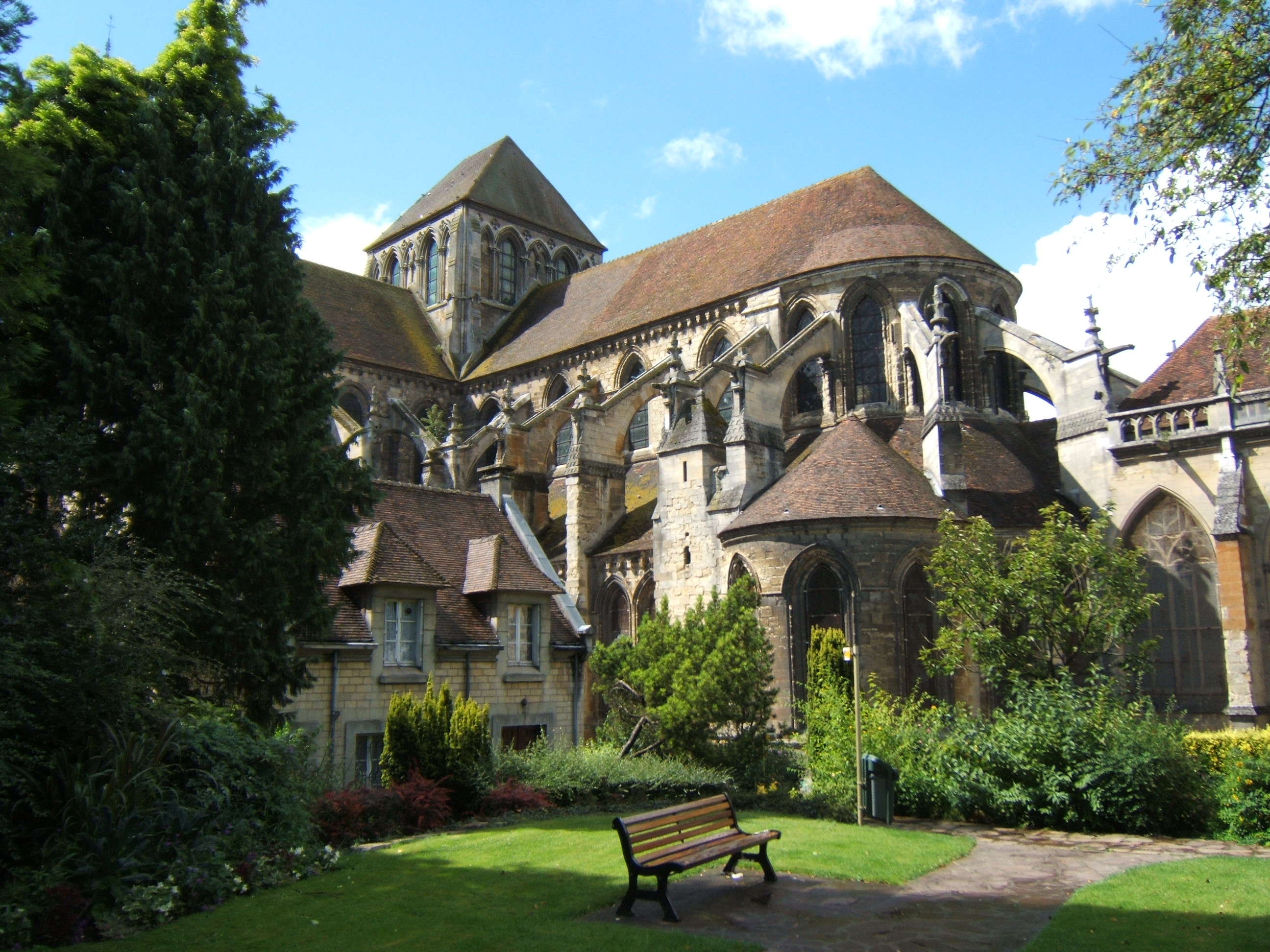
Cathedral of Saint Pierre, Lisieux

The Collège de Lisieux was founded at Paris in 1336 by Bishop Guy de Harcourt, Bishop of Lisieux, by testamentary bequest, and with additional endowments from three members of the d'Estouteville family. It supported twenty-four poor students of the diocese. It lasted until 1764, when it was transferred to the Collège de Dormans.

In August 1417, King Henry V of England besieged, captured and sacked the city of Lisieux. When the Bishop of Lisieux, Pierre Fresnel, was killed in street fighting in Paris on 12 June 1418, King Henry considered it a good moment to install a bishop in Lisieux who would be favorable to the English cause. His wishes ran contrary to those of Pope Martin V, leading to the appointment of Cardinal Branda da Castiglione as administrator of the diocese. When Henry died on 31 August 1422, Martin V was able to appoint Castiglione's nephew as bishop.

== Structure ==
The Chapter of the Cathedral of Saint-Pierre was composed of nine dignities and thirty Canons. The dignities were: the Dean, the Cantor, the Treasurer, the Capicerio, the Magister Scholarum, and the four Archdeacons (Lieuven, Auge, Pont-Audemer, and Gacé). All were appointed by the bishop, except the Dean, who was elected by the Chapter. There were thirty-one prebends, the first eleven of whom had the title of 'Baron'. The cathedral also had four Vicars and thirty chaplains. The Bishop of Lisieux was ex-officio Conservator of the University of Caen.

The diocese of Lisieux contained 487 parishes and 520 rectories.

On its territory there were six abbeys for men and two for women. Almost all of these houses belonged to the Order of Saint Benedict: the male abbeys of Saint-Evroul, Bernay, Préaux, Grestain, Cormeilles, as also the two female houses of Saint-Léger, and Saint-Désir. The sole exception was the male Abbey of Mondaye, located at Mont-Dée, which was a house of Canons Regular belonging to the Order of Premonstratensians.

== List of bishops ==
=== To 1000 ===
- Theudobaudis c. 538–c. 549
- Edibius ? (between 557 and 573)
- Ætherius c. 560?
- Chamnegisilus (or Launomundus) (c. 614)
- Launebaud (Launobaud) 9c. 644)
- Hincho (c. 660)
- [Leudebold (Léodebold)] (c. 662)
- Freculf (823/5–850/2)
- Airard (Hairard) c. 853–c. 880
- Roger (Rogier) c. 985–1022 or c. 980–c. 1018

=== 1000 to 1300 ===
- Robert c. 1022–c. 1025
- Herbert c. 1026–1049
- Hugo d'Eu, 1049–1077 (Rollonide)
- Gilbert Maminot 1077–1101
- Fulcher (Foucher) 1101–1103

[Thomas of Lisieux - son of Ranulf Flambard]

- John 1107–1141
- Arnulf (Arnoul) of Lisieux 1141–1181, statesman and writer
- Raoul de Varneville 1182–1191 or 1192
- Guillaume de Ruffière (Rupière) 1192–1201
- Jourdain du Houmet (Hommet) 1202–1218
- Guillaume Du Pont-de-L'Arche 1218–1250
- Foulque D'Astin 1250–1267
- Guy du Merle 1267–1285
- Guillaume D'Asnières 1285–1298
- Jean de Samois, O.Min. 1299–1302

=== 1300 to 1500 ===
- Guy D'Harcourt 1303–1336
- Guillaume de Charmont 1336–49
- Guillaume Guitard 1349–1358
- Jean de Dormans 1359–1361
- Adhémar Robert 1361–1368
- Alphonse Chevrier 1369–1377
- Nicole Oresme 1377–1382
- Guillaume d'Estouteville 1382–1415
- Pierre Fresnel 1415–1418
- Mathieu Du Bosc 1418–1419
- Branda Castiglione (Cardinal) 1420–1424 (Administrator)
- Zénon Castiglione 1424–1432
- Pierre Cauchon 1432–1442
- Pasquier de Vaux 1443–1447
- Thomas Basin 1447–1474
- Antoine Raguier 1475–1482
- Etienne Blosset de Carrouges 1482–1505

=== From 1500 ===
- Jean Le Veneur (Cardinal de Tillières) 1505–1539
- Jacques D'Annebaut (Cardinal) 1539–1558
- Jean Hennuyer 1561–1578

[Denys Rouxel]

- Jean de Vassé 1580–1583
- Anne de Pérusse D'Escars de Giury, O.S.B. 1589–1598 (Cardinal)
- François Rouxel de Médavy 1600–1617
- Guillaume du Vair 1618–1621
- Guillaume Aleaume (Alleaume) 1622–1634
- Philippe Cospeau 1636–1646
- Léonor I Goyon de Matignon 1646–1674
- Léonor II Goyon de Matignon 1675–1714
- Henri-Ignace de Brancas 1714–1760
- Jacques Marie de Caritat de Condorcet 1761–1783
- Jules-Basile Perron (Ferron) de La Ferronays 1783–1790

== See also ==
- Catholic Church in France
- List of Catholic dioceses in France

== Bibliography ==
=== Reference works ===
- Gams, Pius Bonifatius (1873). Series episcoporum Ecclesiae catholicae: quotquot innotuerunt a beato Petro apostolo. Ratisbon: Typis et Sumptibus Georgii Josephi Manz. (Use with caution; obsolete)
- Eubel, Conradus, ed. (1913). Hierarchia catholica, Tomus 1 (second ed.). Münster: Libreria Regensbergiana. (in Latin)
- Eubel, Conradus, ed. (1914). Hierarchia catholica, Tomus 2 (second ed.). Münster: Libreria Regensbergiana. (in Latin)
- Eubel, Conradus; Gulik, Guilelmus (1923). Hierarchia catholica, Tomus 3 (second ed.). Münster: Libreria Regensbergiana.
- Gauchat, Patritius (Patrice) (1935). Hierarchia catholica IV (1592-1667). Münster: Libraria Regensbergiana.
- Ritzler, Remigius; Sefrin, Pirminus (1952). Hierarchia catholica medii et recentis aevi V (1667-1730). Patavii: Messagero di S. Antonio.
- Ritzler, Remigius; Sefrin, Pirminus (1958). Hierarchia catholica medii et recentis aevi VI (1730-1799). Patavii: Messagero di S. Antonio.

=== Studies ===
- Duchesne, Louis (1910). Fastes épiscopaux de l'ancienne Gaule: II. L'Aquitaine et les Lyonnaises. Paris: Fontemoing.
- Du Tems, Hugues (1774). Le clergé de France, ou tableau historique et chronologique des archevêques, évêques, abbés, abbesses et chefs des chapitres principaux du royaume, depuis la fondation des églises jusqu'à nos jours (in French). Vol. Tome premier. Paris: Delalain.
- Fisquet, Honoré Jean P. (1864). La France pontificale: Metropole de Rouen: Bayeux et Lisieux. Paris: E. Repos.
- H. de Formeville (1873). Histoire de l'ancien évêché - comté de Lisieux (in French). Vol. Tome premier. Lisieux: E. Piel.
- Formeville, H. de (1763). Histoire de l'ancien évêché-comté de Lisieux (in French). Vol. Tome second. Brionne (Eure): le Portulan.
- Hardy, V. (1917) La cathédrale St-Pierre de Lisieux Paris: Frazier-Soye
- Jean, Armand (1891). Les évêques et les archevêques de France depuis 1682 jusqu'à 1801 (in French). Paris: A. Picard. p. 78.
- Piel, Léopold Ferdinand Désiré (1891a), Inventaire historique des actes transcrits aux insinuations ecclésiastiques de l'ancien diocèse de Lisieux, ou, Documents officiels analysés pour servir à l'histoire du personnel de l'évêché, de la cathédrale, des collégiale, des abbayes et prieurés, des paroisses et chapelles, ainsi que de toutes les familles notables de ce diocèse, 1692-1790, Tome I (in French), Lisieux: E. Lerebour.
- Piel, Léopold Ferdinand Désiré (1891), Inventaire historique des actes transcrits aux insinuations ecclésiastiques de l'ancien diocèse de Lisieux, ou, Documents officiels analysés pour servir à l'histoire du personnel de l'évêché, de la cathédrale, des collégiale, des abbayes et prieurés, des paroisses et chapelles, ainsi que de toutes les familles notables de ce diocèse, 1692-1790, Tome II (in French), Lisieux: E. Lerebour.
- Piel, Léopold Ferdinand Désiré (1891c), Inventaire historique des actes transcrits aux insinuations ecclésiastiques de l'ancien diocèse de Lisieux, ou, Documents officiels analysés pour servir à l'histoire du personnel de l'évêché, de la cathédrale, des collégiale, des abbayes et prieurés, des paroisses et chapelles, ainsi que de toutes les familles notables de ce diocèse, 1692-1790, Tome III (in French), Lisieux: E. Lerebour.
- Piel, Léopold Ferdinand Désiré (1891d), Inventaire historique des actes transcrits aux insinuations ecclésiastiques de l'ancien diocèse de Lisieux, ou, Documents officiels analysés pour servir à l'histoire du personnel de l'évêché, de la cathédrale, des collégiale, des abbayes et prieurés, des paroisses et chapelles, ainsi que de toutes les familles notables de ce diocèse, 1692-1790, Tome IV (in French), Lisieux: E. Lerebour.
- Piel, Léopold Ferdinand Désiré (1891e), Inventaire historique des actes transcrits aux insinuations ecclésiastiques de l'ancien diocèse de Lisieux, ou, Documents officiels analysés pour servir à l'histoire du personnel de l'évêché, de la cathédrale, des collégiale, des abbayes et prieurés, des paroisses et chapelles, ainsi que de toutes les familles notables de ce diocèse, 1692-1790, Tome V (in French), Lisieux: E. Lerebour.
- Sainte-Marthe, Denis de; Benedictines of Saint-Maur (1759). Gallia christiana, in provincias ecclesiasticas distributa (in Latin). Vol. Tomus Undecimus: de provincia Rotomagensi. Paris: Johannes- Baptista Coignard.
- Schriber, Carolyn Poling (1990). The Dilemma of Arnulf of Lisieux: New Ideas versus Old Ideals. Bloomington: Indiana University Press. ISBN 0-253-35097-2.
- Seguin, Richard (1832). Histoire du pays d'Auge et des évêques comtes de Lisieux... (in French). Vire: Adam.
- Spear, David S. (Spring 1982). "The Norman Empire and the Secular Clergy, 1066-1204". The Journal of British Studies. XXI (2): 1–10. doi:10.1086/385787. S2CID 153511298.
