= Hyencourt-le-Grand =

- Part of Hypercourt
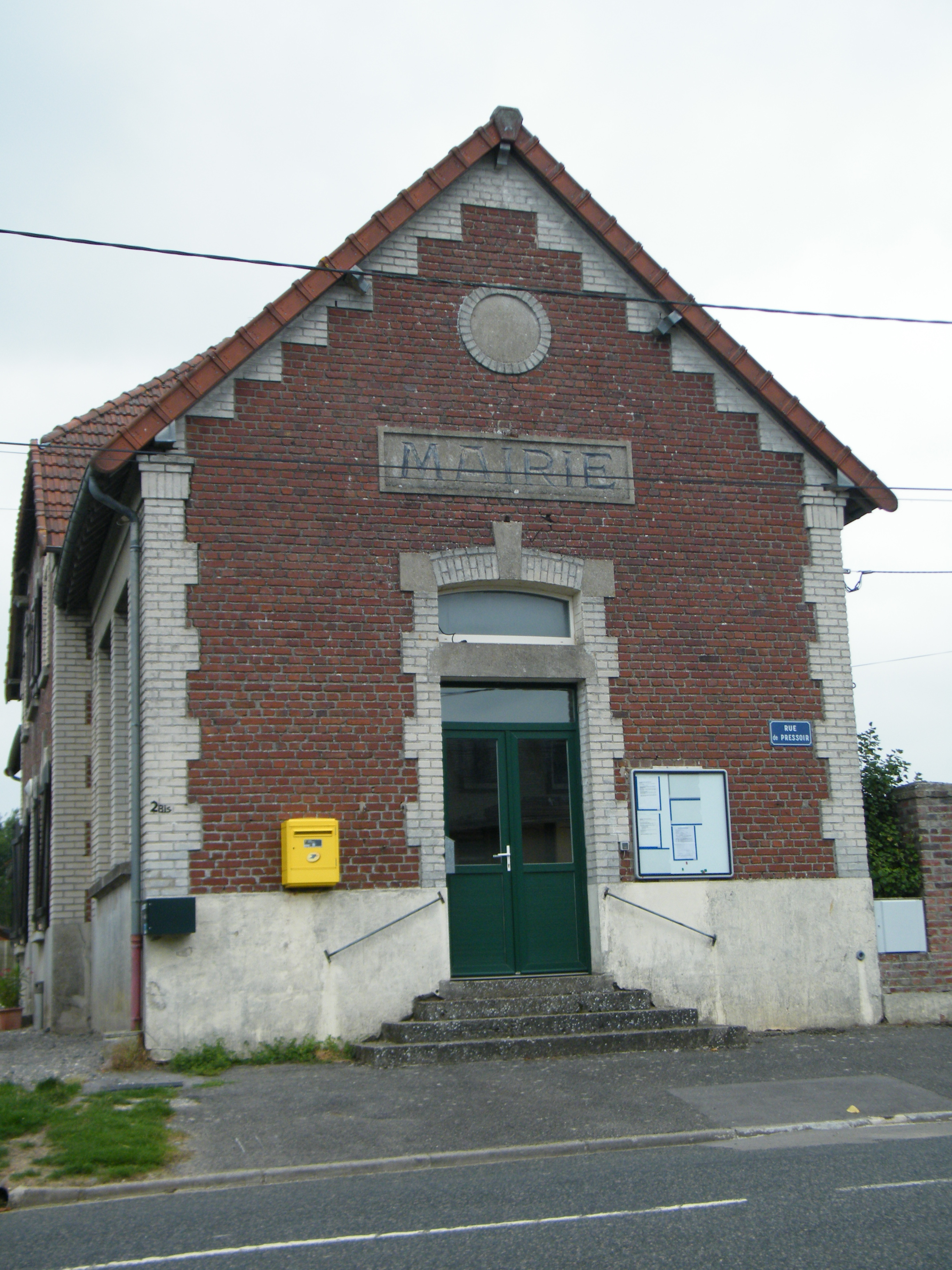
- Location of Hyencourt-le-Grand
- Location within France Location within Hauts-de-France
- Coordinates: 49°49′19″N 2°50′05″E
- Country: France
- Region: Hauts-de-France
- Department: Somme
- Arrondissement: Péronne
- Canton: Ham
- Commune: Hypercourt
- Area^{1}: 2.95 km^{2} (1.14 sq mi)
- Elevation: 98 m (322 ft)
- Highest elevation: 98 m (322 ft)
- Lowest elevation: 75 m (246 ft)
- Population (2021): 74
  - Density: 25/km^{2} (65/sq mi)
- Time zone: UTC+01:00 (CET)
  - Summer (DST): UTC+02:00 (CEST)
- Postal code: 80320
- ^{1} French Land Register data, which excludes lakes, ponds, glaciers > 1 km^{2} (0.386 sq mi or 247 acres) and river estuaries.

Hyencourt-le-Grand is a former commune in the Somme department in Hauts-de-France in northern France. On 1 January 2017, it was merged into the new commune Hypercourt.

== Geography ==
The commune is situated on the D164 road, some 28 miles (45 km) southeast of Amiens in the area known as the Santerre.

== History ==
The first reference to the village of Hyencourt-le-Grand occurs during the Middle Ages when a château was built here. All that remains of the château is the chapel of Saint-Léger, rebuilt after the First World War and restored by local people in 2005. Buried beneath the village is a World War I military hospital. Occasional subsidence indicates its presence.

== Population ==
Historical population
Year	Pop.	±% p.a.
2006	87	—
2011	82	−1.18%
2021	74	−1.02%
Source: INSEE

== See also ==
- Communes of the Somme department
