= Geoffrey Ridel (bishop of Ely) =

12th-century Bishop of Ely and Chancellor of England

- Bishop of Ely
- Elected: late April 1173
- Term ended: August 1189
- Predecessor: Nigel
- Successor: William Longchamp
- Other posts: Archdeacon of Canterbury

Orders
- Consecration: 6 October 1174

Personal details
- Died: 20 or 21 August 1189
- Buried: Ely Cathedral
- Denomination: Catholic

Lord Chancellor
- In office 1162–1173
- Monarch: Henry II of England
- Preceded by: Thomas Becket
- Succeeded by: Ralph de Warneville

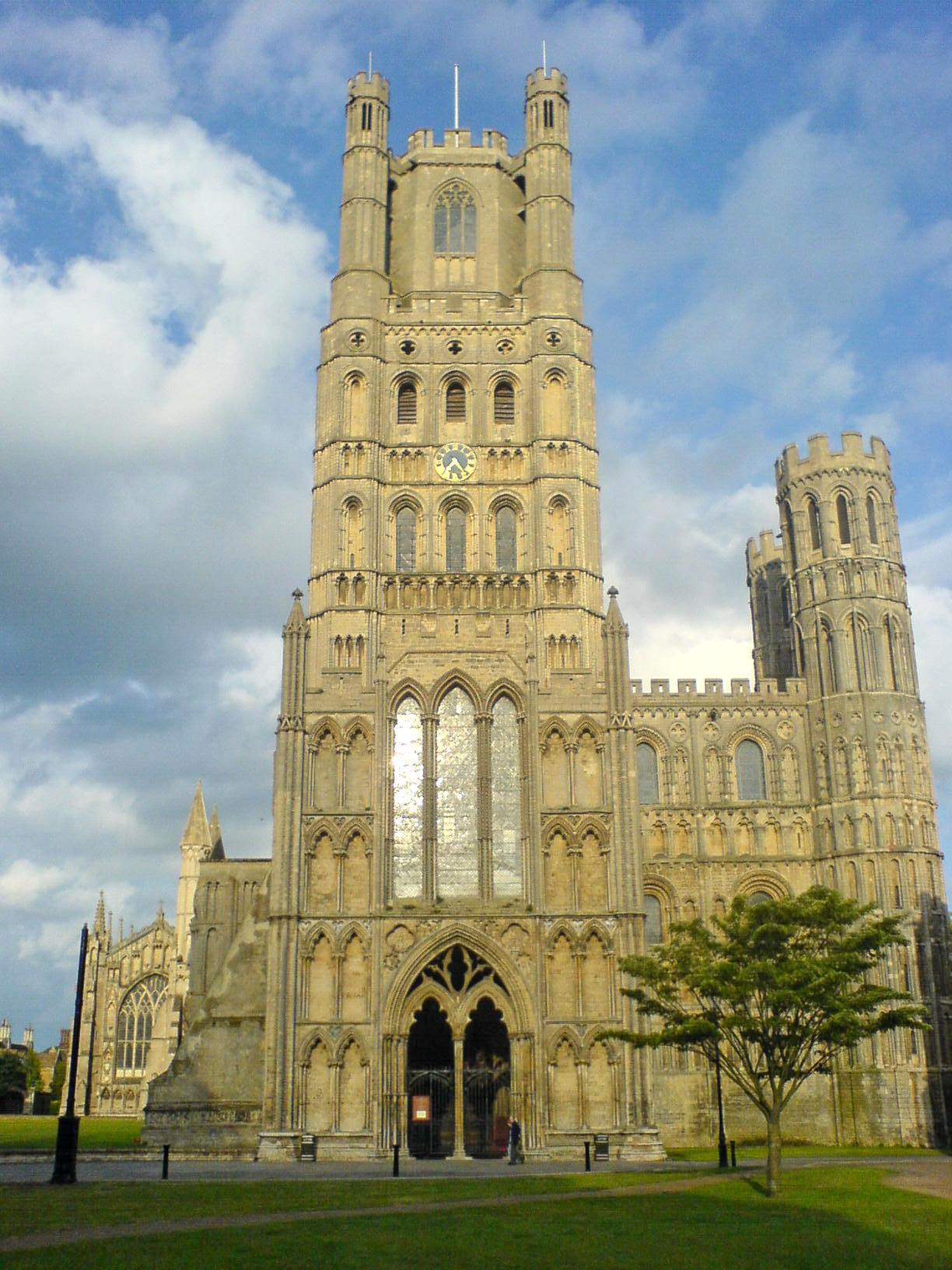
Exterior view of Ely Cathedral, where Ridel is buried.

Geoffrey Ridel (died August 1189) was the nineteenth Lord Chancellor of England, from 1162 to 1173.

Ridel was probably the great-nephew of Geoffrey Ridel, who died in 1120 and was a royal justice. He was a royal clerk by about 1156, when he first started witnessing charters. He was a king's clerk before he was Archdeacon of Canterbury, which office he held by March 1163. He performed the duties of the chancellor's office after Thomas Becket resigned the office, but no documents explicitly name him to the office. He also served as a royal judge. By 1165, Ridel was a baron of the Exchequer.

During the controversy between King Henry II of England and Archbishop Thomas Becket, Ridel supported the king. Ridel was one of the persons whom the Constitutions of Clarendon were addressed to, along with Richard de Luci and Richard of Ilchester. Ridel went to Rome in 1164 to represent the king before the papal curia, and in 1166 opposed Becket once more. By 1169 he was urging King Louis VII of France to no longer give refuge to Becket. Becket's supporters called Ridel the "archidiabolus", or "our archdevil", a play on the office of archdeacon which Ridel held. Ridel also urged King Henry's son, Henry the Young King, to refuse to see the archbishop in 1170, telling the prince that Becket wished to disinherit the prince.

After the controversy was resolved, Ridel was rewarded with a bishopric. He was elected to the see of Ely in late April 1173 and consecrated on 6 October 1174 at Canterbury. For several years previous to his election he had been the custodian of the see and had received the episcopal revenues. He resigned the chancellorship when he became a bishop. He continued to be involved in governmental affairs, attending councils and escorting King Henry II's daughter Joanna to Provence when the princess was sent to Sicily to marry King William II of Sicily. He also continued to hold the office of baron of the exchequer at least as late as 1185.

Ridel died on either 20 or 21 August 1189. After his death, King Richard I of England confiscated his personal property, because Geoffrey had died without a will. The bishop's estate at his death included over 3000 marks in coins, as well as agricultural supplies and gold and silver plate. He was buried in Ely Cathedral. During his time as bishop, he built much of the western transept of Ely Cathedral.

== Citations ==
Political offices
Preceded by Thomas Becket	Lord Chancellor; 1162–1173	Succeeded by Ralph de Warneville
Catholic Church titles
Preceded by Nigel	Bishop of Ely; 1173–1189	Succeeded by William Longchamp
