= Jean Derode =

French flying ace

Jean Marie Émile Derode
- Born: 16 September 1887; Saint-Jacques par Lisieux, France
- Died: 4 June 1918 (aged 30)
- Military career
- Allegiance: France
- Branch: Cavalry; aviation
- Rank: Capitaine
- Unit: Escadrille 67
- Commands: Escadrille 102, Escadrille 99
- Awards: Legion d'Honneur; Croix de Guerre; Belgian Croix de Guerre

Capitaine Jean Marie Émile Derode was a French World War I flying ace credited with seven aerial victories.

== Biography ==
Jean Marie Émile Derode was born in Saint-Jacques par Lisieux, France, on 16 September 1887.

Derode began the war as a dragoon, but switched to aviation in 1915. He transferred to aviation, underwent pilot's training, and received his Military Pilot's Brevet on 26 February 1916.

He was posted to Escadrille 67 to pilot a Nieuport. He staked an unconfirmed claim on 16 October 1916, and followed it up with official ones on 15 November and 27 December 1916. He was given command of Escadrille 102, and began scoring with it on 23 April 1917. He brought home a badly damaged machine from this sortie, and was honored for his effort with the Médaille militaire. He continued to score with his squadron, reaching six confirmed and three unconfirmed victories by 6 March 1918. His command was then switched to Escadrille 99. He used one of their Spads to shoot down his seventh victim on 4 June 1918, only to be promptly shot down himself and killed in action.

== Honors and awards ==
Chevalier de la Légion d'Honneur (awarded 5 May 1917)

"Temporary capitaine, commanding escadrille N102; excellent squadron commander who, in his competitive spirit with his pilots, never ceases to display the greatest intrepidity. He has had numerous combats during the course of which he has downed three enemy planes. He particularly distinguished himself on 23 April 1917 by his energy and coolness, in succeeding to land normally in our lines after his plane was severely damaged during combat with an enemy plane. Already cited three times in orders."

He also had been awarded the Croix de Guerre with nine palms.
