= Omiécourt =

- Part of Hypercourt
- Location of Omiécourt
- Location within France Location within Hauts-de-France
- Coordinates: 49°48′35″N 2°50′49″E
- Country: France
- Region: Hauts-de-France
- Department: Somme
- Arrondissement: Péronne
- Canton: Ham
- Commune: Hypercourt
- Area^{1}: 5.54 km^{2} (2.14 sq mi)
- Elevation: 87 m (285 ft)
- Highest elevation: 91 m (299 ft)
- Lowest elevation: 79 m (259 ft)
- Population (2021): 257
  - Density: 46.4/km^{2} (120/sq mi)
- Time zone: UTC+01:00 (CET)
  - Summer (DST): UTC+02:00 (CEST)
- Postal code: 80320
- ^{1} French Land Register data, which excludes lakes, ponds, glaciers > 1 km^{2} (0.386 sq mi or 247 acres) and river estuaries.

Omiécourt (French pronunciation: [ɔmjekuʁ]) is a former commune in the Somme department in Hauts-de-France in northern France. On 1 January 2017, it was merged into the new commune Hypercourt.

== Geography ==
The commune is situated on the N17 and D42 crossroads, 48 kilometres (30 mi) east of Amiens.

== Population ==
Historical population
Year	Pop.	±% p.a.
2006	235	—
2011	238	+0.25%
2021	257	+0.77%
Source: INSEE

== See also ==
- Communes of the Somme department
- Georges Vérez, sculptor of war memorial.
