= Hôtel de Ville, Lisieux =

Town hall in Lisieux, France

Hôtel de Ville
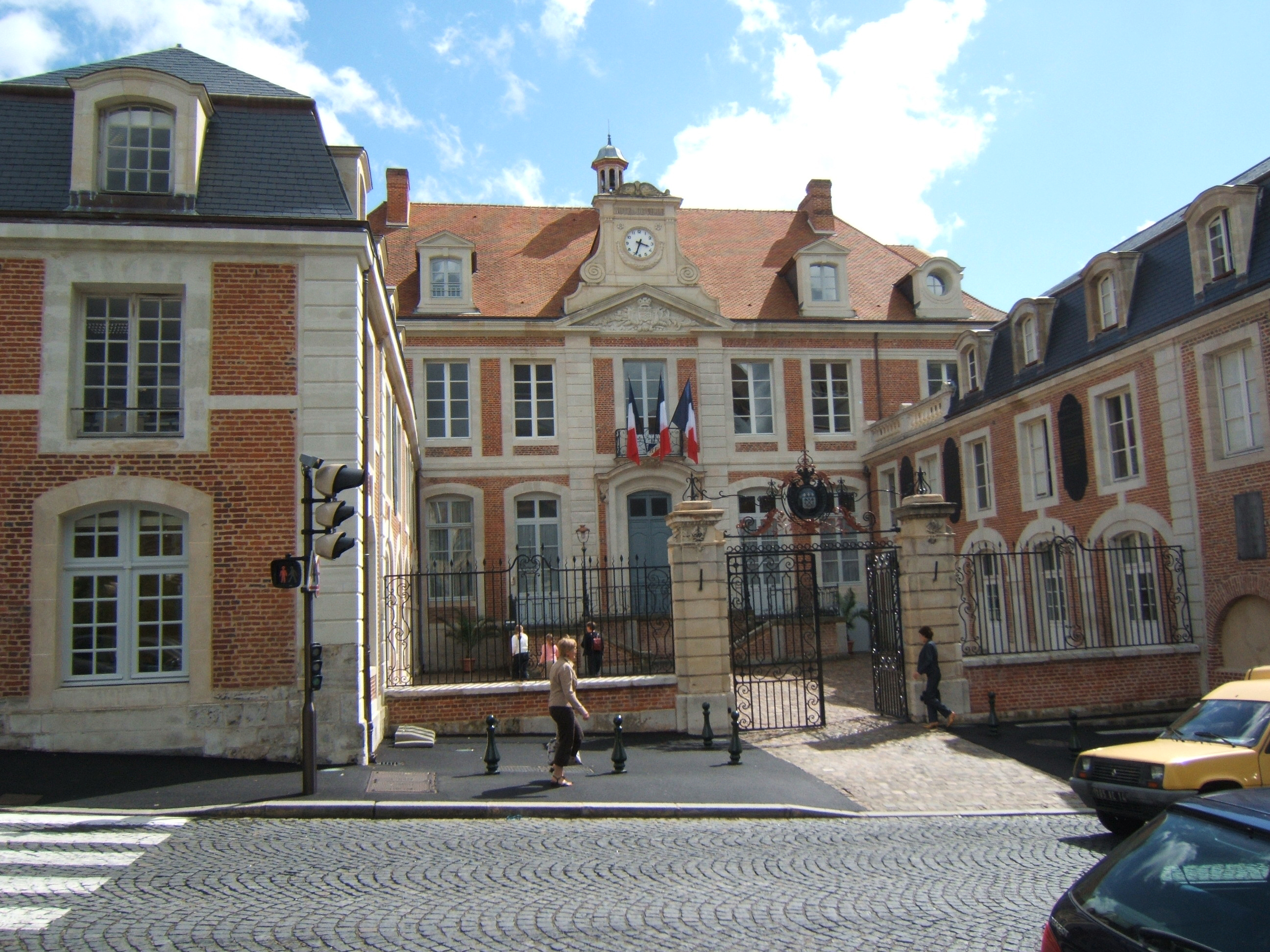
- The main frontage of the Hôtel de Ville in August 2007

General information
- Type: City hall
- Architectural style: Neoclassical style
- Location: Lisieux, France
- Coordinates: 49.1459°N 0.2278°E
- Completed: 1713

Monument historique
- Official name: Hôtel de ville
- Type: Inscrit
- Designated: 1968
- Reference no.: PA00111475

The Hôtel de Ville (French pronunciation: [otɛl də vil], City Hall) is a municipal building in Lisieux, Calvados, in northwestern France, standing on Rue Henry Chéron. It was designated a monument historique by the French government in 1968.

== History ==
The aldermen of Lisieux established their first municipal office in a room they rented near the Palais épiscopal (episcopal palace) in 1445. They then relocated to a manor house between what is now Rue Henri Chéron and what is now Rue du Docteur Degrenne in 1458. By the second half of the 18th century, the manor house had become dilapidated and the aldermen decided to acquire new premises. The building they selected was on the south side of what is now Rue Henry Chéron.

The building had been commissioned by Charles Lebas, who was later seigneur of the Château de Préaux-Saint-Sébastien some 21 kilometres (13 mi) to the south of the town. It was a typical hôtel particulier with a grand gate, a grand courtyard and two ornate façades. It had been designed in the neoclassical style, built in red brick with stone finishings and had been completed in 1713.

The original layout involved a main block at the back of the courtyard, and a single-storey western block. The central bay featured a segmental-headed doorway with a moulded surround on the ground floor, and a French door with an iron balcony on the first floor. The central bay was flanked by banded pilasters supporting a pediment with a coat of arms in the tympanum. Above the pediment, there was a clock supported by scrolls and, behind the clock, there was a small octagonal lantern. The other bays in the main block were fenestrated by segmental-headed windows on the ground floor and by square-headed windows on the first floor.

The house was acquired by François-Claude Duval-Lenormand, who was secretary to King Louis XV, in 1740 and by Pierre-René de La Roque, who was seigneur of Serquigny in 1753. After the property had been acquired by the council in 1771, an extensive programme of work, involving an extra floor on the western wing and a whole new eastern wing, was carried out to prepare the building for municipal use. One of the reception rooms, with a fine fireplace, was converted to form the Salle des Mariages (wedding room).

The president of France, Albert Lebrun, visited the town hall and met with council officials on 9 July 1932. During the liberation of the town by allied troops on 23 August 1944, part of the Second World War, Captain Georges Poinlane of the French Forces of the Interior was shot by a German sniper in front of the town hall: after the war a plaque was fixed to the facade of the building to commemorate his life. Another plaque was fixed to the facade of the town hall in May 1953 to commemorate the lives of workers who had been the victims of crimes in the workplace.
