= Lisieux Cathedral =

Cathedral located in Lisieux, Calvados, France

Coordinates: 49°8′48″N 0°13′37″E

Lisieux Cathedral Cathédrale Saint-Pierre de Lisieux
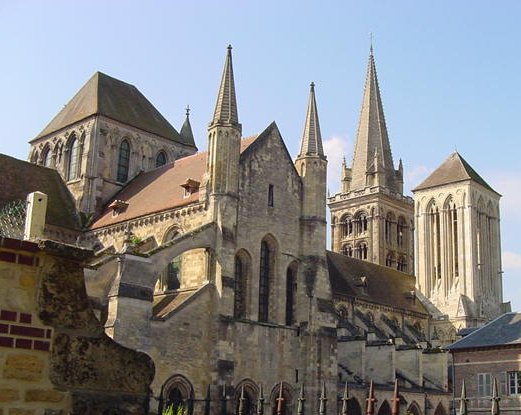
- Lisieux Cathedral from the northwest

Religion
- Affiliation: Catholic
- Province: Bishop of Lisieux
- Region: Calvados
- Ecclesiastical or organisational status: Cathedral
- Status: Active

Location
- Location: Lisieux, France
- Interactive map of Lisieux Cathedral; Cathédrale Saint-Pierre de Lisieux

Architecture
- Type: church
- Groundbreaking: 12th century
- Completed: 18th century

Lisieux Cathedral (French: Cathédrale Saint-Pierre de Lisieux) is a Catholic church located in Lisieux, France. The cathedral was the seat of the Bishop of Lisieux until the diocese of Lisieux was abolished under the Concordat of 1801 and merged into the Diocese of Bayeux.

== History ==
An earlier cathedral is presumed to have existed since the 6th century, as there was a Bishop of Lisieux from that time, but not much is known of the earlier edifice.

A previous cathedral built in the Romanesque style was burned by Geoffrey of Anjou in 1136. Its pre-nave layout has been maintained. Bishop Arnulf was at first only able to do essential repairs before he started the requisite full rebuilding in 1160. Busy with the reconstructions, he missed a papal summons to Rome in 1144 and struggled later to finance the reconstruction.

It is wrongly claimed that Henry Plantagenet, Count of Anjou, Duke of Normandy and future king of England, married Eleanor of Aquitaine at the cathedral in 1152. In fact they married in Poitiers Cathedral. In 1226, a fire damaged the cathedral and bishop Guillaume Du Pont-de-L'Arche added three ambulatory chapels to the repairs.

The lantern tower was built in 1250.

Having been involved in the trial of Joan of Arc, Pierre Cauchon was named as Bishop of Lisieux in 1432.He is thought to be buried in a stone coffin in the Cathedral's right transept.

A new south-west tower with a pre-gothic design was built in 1553 when the previous had fallen.

== Description ==
The edifice is 110 meters and is a national monument.

The west front of the building consists of three portals surmounted by two towers. The south tower was built in the 16th century and at the top bears a 17th-century flèche. Buttresses were added to the south face in the 15th century. The cathedral survived World War II wholly intact, although the town suffered Allied bombing in 1944.

From the outset, the architect designed quadripartite rib vaults and flying buttresses, making it one of Normandy’s first Gothic buildings. The nave is fairly austere and is inspired by the Gothic architectural style of the Île de France, whereas the most recent parts of the building were constructed in the 18th century (the chevet, and the western façade) in Norman style.

== Music ==
An organ made by Aristide Cavaillé-Coll was installed during the nineteenth century.

== Gallery ==
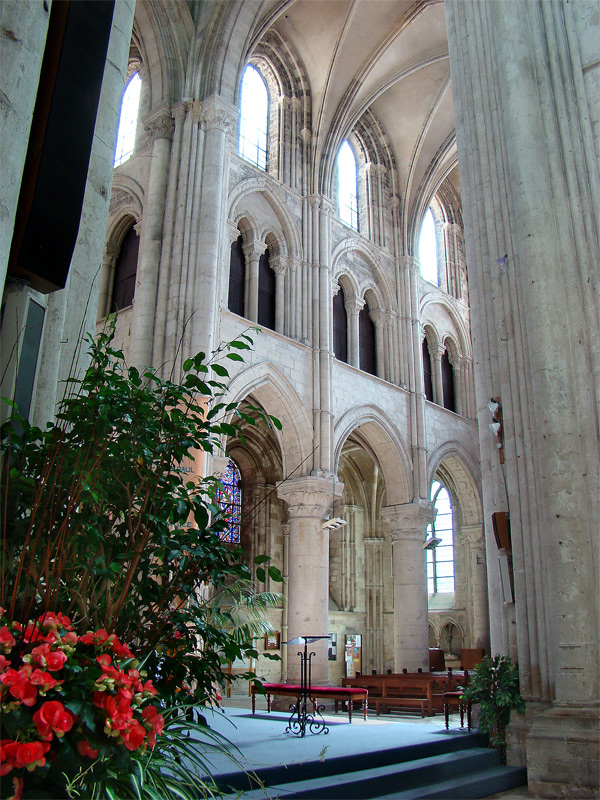
Interior

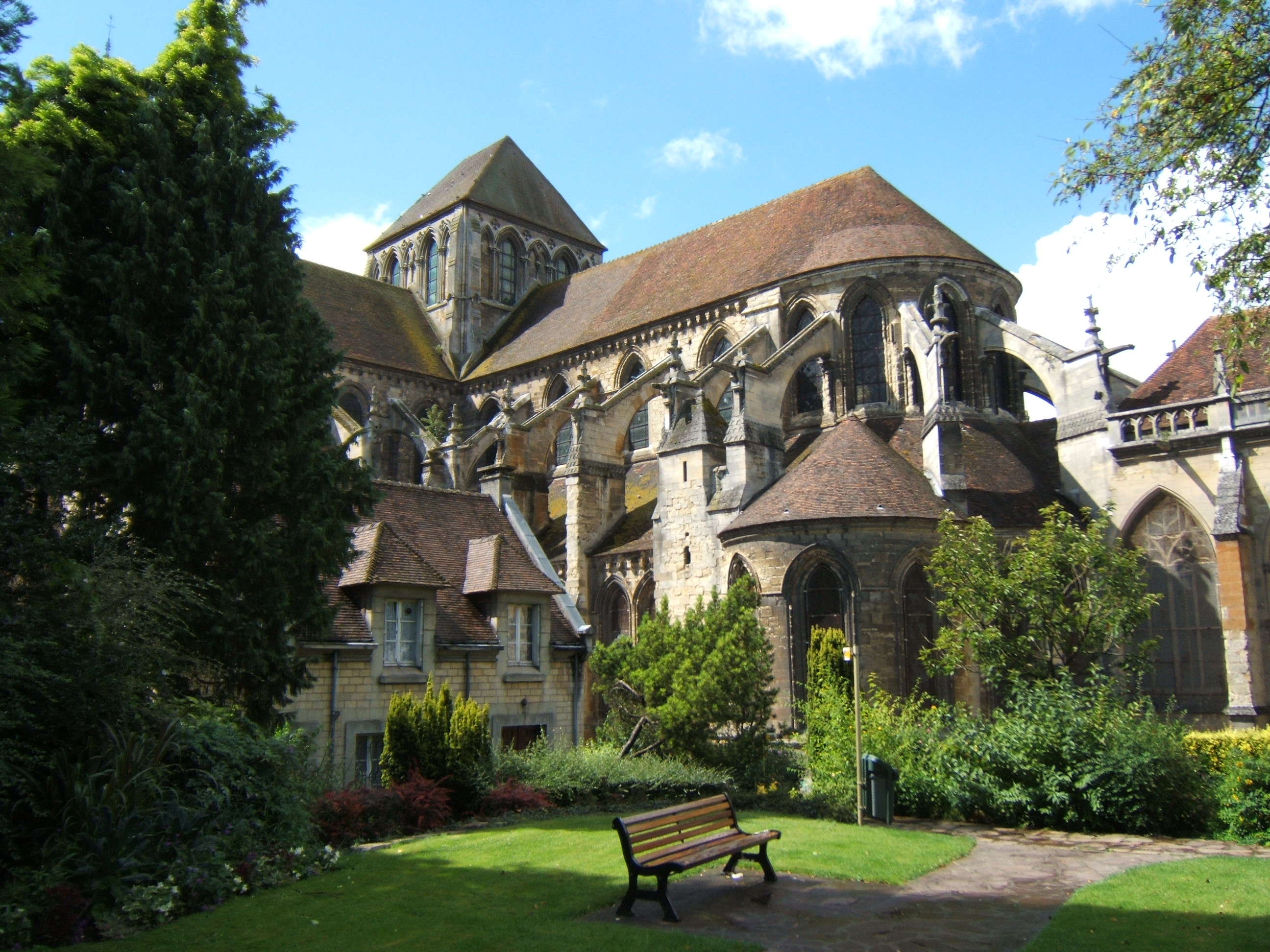
Apse

== See also ==
- List of Gothic cathedrals in Europe
- Basilica of Sainte-Thérèse, Lisieux

== Sources ==
- Grant, Lindy (1 January 2005). Architecture and Society in Normandy 1120-1270. Yale University Press. p. 67. ISBN 978-0-300-10686-2.
- O'Reilly, Elizabeth Boyle (1 August 2022). How France Built Her Cathedrals: A Study in the Twelfth and Thirteenth Centuries. DigiCat.
