= Georges Vérez =

French sculptor

Georges Armand Vérez was born in Lille on 1 August 1877 and died on 17 January 1932. He was a pupil of Louis-Ernest Barrias and Jules Coutan. In 1905 he was runner-up for the annual Prix de Rome for sculpture. After the end of the 1914-1918 war he was mostly involved executing sculptural work on war memorials for which the demand was huge.

== War memorials ==
Name	Date	Notes
The war memorial of Lisieux		This war memorial honours not only the dead of Lisieux but also the neighbouring communes of Saint-Jacques and Saint-Désir.
The war memorial at Criel	1926	Vérez's sculpture is carved from limestone and the theme of his composition is "La Paix".
The war memorial at Cambrai	1924	In his composition, Vérez has an angel of victory who has by her side several soldiers and a tank. Cambrai was the location of one of the first uses of the tank in the 1914-1918 war. A public subscription was opened to raise funds to finance the building of the memorial and after a competition was organised to select the best proposal, the architects Lamonnier and Halley were chosen on 31 December 1923. Lamonnier and Halley had a good track record having designed the war memorials at Chamonix, Sangatte and Malo-les-Bains. Their preferred sculptor was Georges Vérez who had already carried out sculptural work on the Cambrai Town Hall. Cambrai war memorial. Vérez depicts several soldiers advancing alongside a tank, all seemingly protected by the angel of victory's wing
The war memorial of Pau	1927	The sculptor called this composition "France victorieuse". Pau war memorial
The war memorial of Ris-Orangis	1921	Carved from limestone. Depicts a helmeted "Angel of Victory" holding out branches of laurel.
Monument in Ris-Orangis cemetery	1922	Vérez also carried out the sculptural work on a monument in Ris-Orangis' cemetery. This limestone monument was it seems offered to the commune by an American couple, the Johnstone-Reckitts, who had founded a nearby military hospital. The monument takes the form of a mausoleum and at one end Vérez has carved a soldier.
The war memorial of Croissy-sur-Seine	1921	When the local authority decided to arrange a competition to decide who should be asked to erect the war memorial to commemorate the 145 men of Croissy-sur-Seine who lost their lives in the 1914-1918 war, 27 architects submitted offers and Albert Le Monnier was finally awarded the contract.
The war memorial at Omiécourt in the Somme		Vérez completed the sculptural work for this war memorial.
The war memorial of Granville	1922	The Granville in the Manche war memorial features a representation of a soldier worked in bronze. Verez' soldier is very similar to that executed for the Chamonix memorial in Haute-Savoie
The war memorial of Pantin	1927	As was the case with Criel, Vérez's limestone carving was of a woman representing "La Paix".
The war memorial of Orsay in Essonne	1924	The founders Val d'Osne used Vérez to create some of the bronze sculptures which they marketed throughout France. Orsay's memorial features a depiction of a French soldier which was listed in the Val-d'Osne catalogue under reference number 893 and entitled "Poilu". The Orsay memorial was inaugurated 9 November 1924. It seems that the foundry produced less than 10 copies of the work so it did not prove popular and, perhaps significantly, did not appear in the first editions of the Val-d'Osne commemorative catalogue.
The war memorial of Brandeville in Meuse	1925	Another Val-d'Osne catalogued work by Vérez was called the "Victoire ailée" (879 in the catalogue). It was based on an original Vérez carving for the Bonneville war memorial in Haute-Savoie. As with the Val-d'Osne work used at Orsay it did not prove a success.
The war memorial of Belfort		In 1922 the committee formed to organise the building of a war memorial awarded the contract to Albert Le Monnier and Georges Vérez. The memorial was to be made from local stone; the white stone of Lorraine and the rose coloured granite of the Vosges. Belfort War Memorial. An enormous winged goddess stands above a group of soldiers.

== Other works ==
Name	Date	Notes
Four large sculptured groups for the Grand Foyer of Lille Opera House		Vérez carved four sculptures for the foyer of Lille Opera House.
Le Pardon	1909	This work was exhibited at the Salon des Artistes Français in 1909. The work is now located in place Vanhoenacker in Liile. See photograph Le Pardon
La Charité	1909	This work was also exhibited at the Salon des Artistes Français in 1909.
Cambrai theatre	1929	The sculpture is located inside of the theatre.
