= Hypercourt =

- Commune
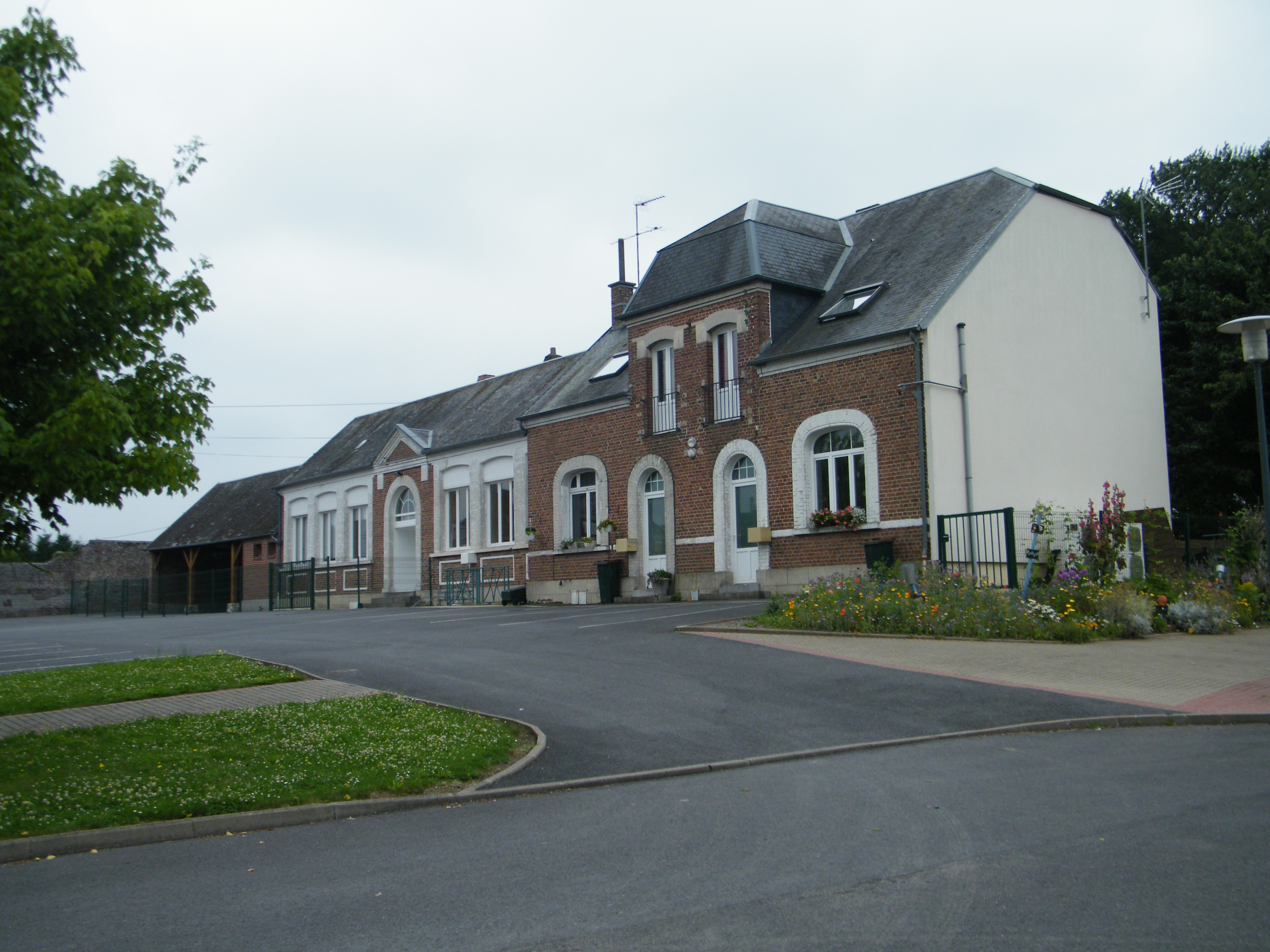
- The town hall in Pertain
- Location of Hypercourt
- Location within France Location within Hauts-de-France
- Coordinates: 49°48′43″N 2°52′12″E
- Country: France
- Region: Hauts-de-France
- Department: Somme
- Arrondissement: Péronne
- Canton: Ham
- Intercommunality: Terre de Picardie

Government
  - Mayor (2020–2026): Christian Lebrun
- Area^{1}: 15.57 km^{2} (6.01 sq mi)
- Population (2023): 679
  - Density: 43.6/km^{2} (113/sq mi)
- Time zone: UTC+01:00 (CET)
  - Summer (DST): UTC+02:00 (CEST)
- INSEE/Postal code: 80621 /80320
- ^{1} French Land Register data, which excludes lakes, ponds, glaciers > 1 km^{2} (0.386 sq mi or 247 acres) and river estuaries.

Hypercourt (French pronunciation: [ipɛʁkuʁ]) is a commune in the department of Somme, northern France. The municipality was established on 1 January 2017 by merger of the former communes of Pertain (the seat), Hyencourt-le-Grand and Omiécourt.

== See also ==
- Communes of the Somme department
