= Jacques d'Annebaut =

French cardinal

Jacques d'Annebaut (Denebaud, Anebault and Annebault) (died 1557) was a French cardinal. He was a cousin of Jean Le Veneur (their mothers Marie and Marguerite Blosset were sisters), and brother of Claude d'Annebault, marshal of France.

He became bishop of Lisieux in 1539. He was created Cardinal in 1544. After the disgrace of his brother he left court.
