= Arnulf of Lisieux =

French bishop (died 1184)

Arnulf of Lisieux (1104/1109 – 31 August 1184) was a medieval French bishop who figured prominently as a conservative figure during the Renaissance of the 12th century, built the Cathedral of Lisieux, which introduced Gothic architecture to Normandy, and implemented the reforms of Bernard of Clairvaux.

== Biography ==
He was born in Normandy, the second son of Hardouin de Neuville, and was educated there by his elder brother, Jean, Bishop of Sées. It is probable that he studied theology in Paris in the mid-1120s. By 1133 he was a clerk in the household of Geoffrey of Leves, Bishop of Chatres and was studying Roman Law in Bologna. He made his mark writing in defence of Pope Innocent II a violent letter against Gerard, bishop of Angoulême, a partisan of the Jewish-descended Antipope Anacletus II (Petrus Leonis). He went to England to serve in the court of Stephen during The Anarchy.

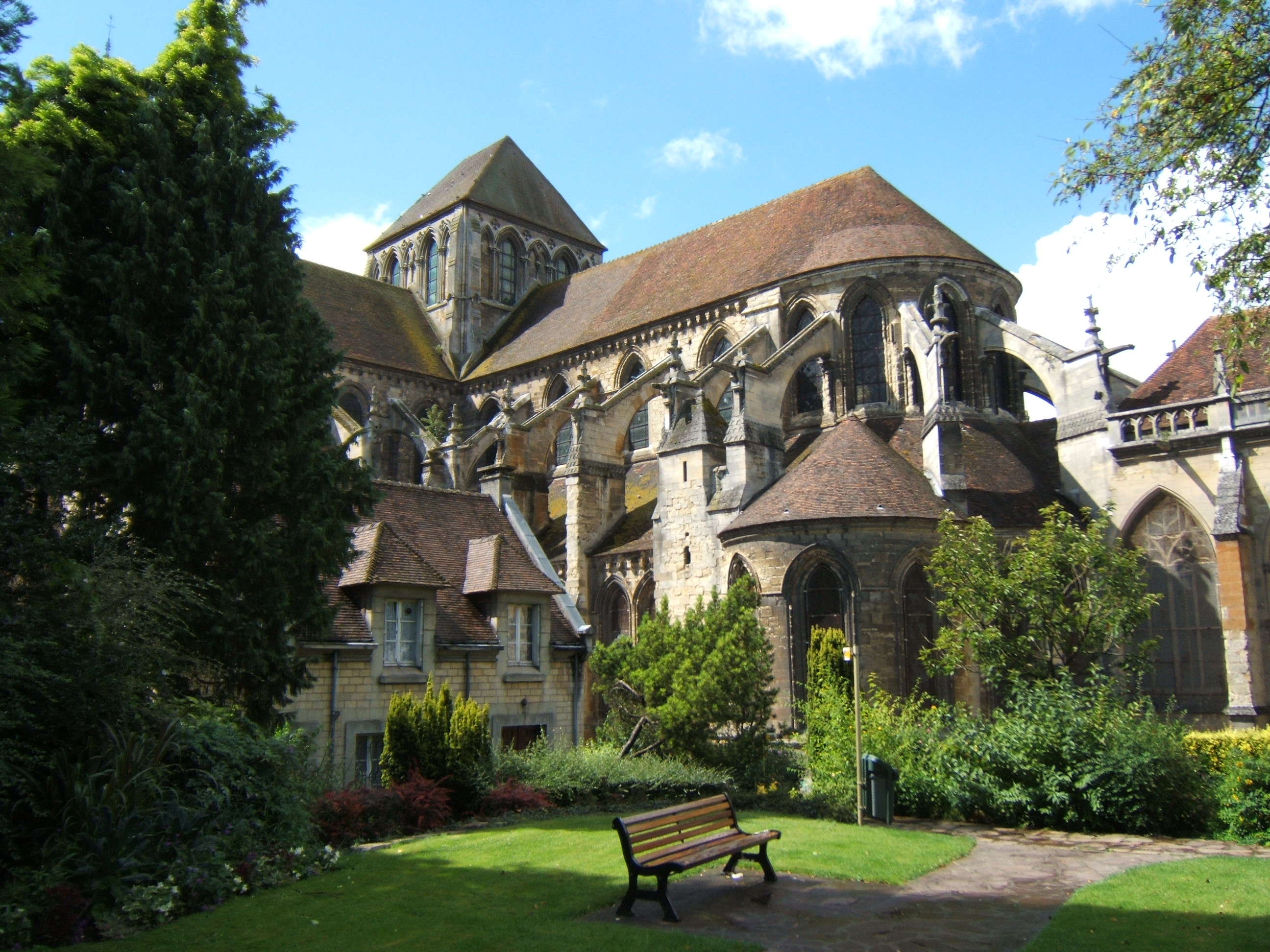
Cathedral of Saint Pierre, Lisieux

In 1141 Arnulf was raised to the See of Lisieux. He started to repair the cathedral, which had been burned 5 years prior, before having the funds to start the necessary full rebuilding in 1160. He accompanied Louis VII on his crusade (1147), was faithful to Pope Alexander III at the Council of Tours (1163) during the schism, and encouraged his brother bishops to defend the cause of ecclesiastical liberty against Henry II of England.

He was an early partisan of Henry in his struggles as Duke of Normandy to become king of England and took the king's side in the conflict between Henry and Thomas Becket, but in attempting to mediate between king and archbishop he alienated both sides; after Becket's murder Arnulf undertook the royal defence before the pope. In 1181 or perhaps a little earlier, he lost the good will of the king, and for a while that of Pope Lucius III. He then resigned his see, claiming age and feebleness, and retired to the Abbey of St. Victor, Paris, where he died. His writings include a collection of letters, collated by himself, which survive in 19 manuscripts, and some poetry.

He was the uncle of Hugh Nonant, who was Bishop of Coventry from 1185 to 1198.

== Sources ==
- Grant, Lindy (1 January 2005). Architecture and Society in Normandy 1120-1270. Yale University Press. p. 28. ISBN 978-0-300-10686-2.
- Potthast, August, Bibliotheca historica medii aevi, 2d ed., vol. I:121
- Molinier, Auguste, Sources de l'histoire de France (1902), II, n. 1908
- Spear, David S. "The Norman Empire and the Secular Clergy, 1066–1204" The Journal of British Studies Volume XXI Number 2 Spring 1982 p. 1–10
