= Jean Le Veneur =

French bishop, courtier and royal official

Cardinal Jean Le Veneur
- Cardinal-Priest
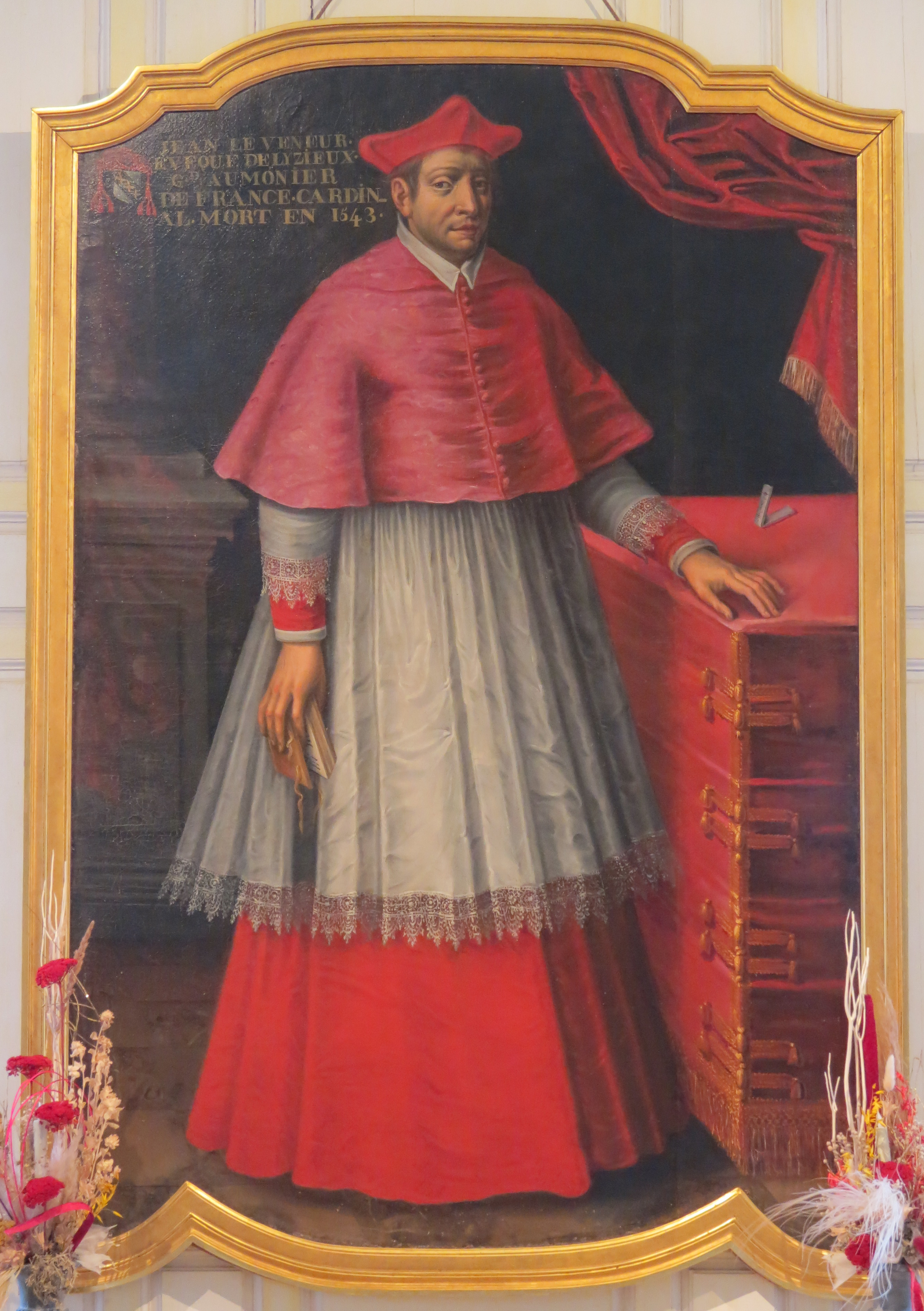
- Posthumous portrait of Jean Le Veneur
- Church: San Bartolomeo all'Isola
- Diocese: Lisieux (1505-1539)
- Other posts: Abbot of Grestain (1503-1539); Abbot of Lonlay (1505-1543); Abbot of Préaux (1506-1535); Abbot of Mont-Saint-Michel (1524-1539); Abbot of N.D. de Lyre (1530-1535); Abbot of S. Fuscien (1533-1543); Abbot of Bec (1535-1543?)

Orders
- Created cardinal: 7 November 1533 by Pope Clement VII

Personal details
- Born: ca. 1473 Normandy
- Died: 7 or 8 August 1543 Marle, Picardy, France
- Parents: Philippe, baron of Tillières; Marie Blosset

Jean Le Veneur (1473 - 7 August 1543) was a French abbot, bishop, courtier, royal official, and Roman Catholic cardinal.

== Biography ==
Jean Le Veneur was born into a noble family of Normandy. He was the second son of Philippe, baron of Tillières, Valquier and Homme; his mother was Marie Blosset, the sister of Bishop Stephen Blosset de Carouges of Lisieux (1482–1505). Jean le Veneur's brother Gabriel inherited the baronies. His brother Ambroise became Bishop of Évreux (1511–1532), and his first-cousin on his mother's side, Jacques d'Annebaut, eventually became a Cardinal himself.

=== Canon, archdeacon, abbot ===
Le Veneur's first post was as titular parish priest at Nôtre-Dame et Saint-Léonard in Honfleur in 1497. At the age of twenty-four, Jean le Veneur became Archdeacon of Auge in the Church of Lisieux, no doubt both under his uncle's patronage. He became Abbot of the Abbey of Grestain in the diocese of Lisieux thanks to the intervention of his uncle and of King Louis XII. He took possession of the monastery on 29 May 1503 by proxy, and on 26 May 1504 in person. He was also a Canon of the Church of Paris.

=== Bishop ===
Le Veneur was elected Bishop of Lisieux on 2 October 1505, in succession to his maternal uncle; he remained in this position until 18 August 1539. He also acquired from his uncle the Abbey of Lonlay (Longiledus) in the diocese of Le Mans in 1505, and he seems to have held it during his entire lifetime. He was a Councillor of State by 1507, with a salary of 600 livres.

In 1506 Bishop Le Veneur was named Abbot Commendatory of the Abbey of Préaux. He held the abbey until 1535, when he resigned it in favor of Jacques d' Annebaut.

On 20 June 1510, Bishop Le Veneur was one of the prelates who assisted at the funeral of Cardinal Georges d'Amboise in Rouen.

In 1511 Bishop Le Veneur participated in the schismatic Council of Pisa, under the presidency of Cardinal Bernardino López de Carvajal

Jean le Veneur became the first Abbot Commendatory of the Abbey of Mont-Saint-Michel in 1524, by appointment of King Francis I in accordance with the Concordat between him and Pope Leo X of 1516. The monks of Mont-Saint-Michel attempted to assert their ancient privileges and voted to elect René de Mary. When they sent their news to the Court, the King's mother, Louise of Savoy, wrote in reply demanding that they sent representatives to present their documents showing the grant of their privilege of election, and at the same time inviting them to submit their votes for Jean le Veneur. They submitted their bulls, and received in return a letter from the King, expressing his desire that they choose Jean le Veneur. It took a second royal letter, ordering the monks to elect Le Veneur and no other, for the business to be accomplished. In 1539, Cardinal le Veneur resigned the Abbey into the hands of Pope Paul III, recommending that the Pope appoint as his successor his friend and cousin Jacques d'Annebault. The Bull authorizing the transfer was dated 18 August 1539.

On 10 May 1517, the Bishop of Lisieux was present at the Coronation of Claude of Brittany as Queen of France in the royal Abbey of S. Denis by Cardinal Philippe de Luxembourg. She had been married to King Francis I on 18 May 1514.

On 4 March 1525 Bishop Le Veneur was named Lieutenant-General of the government of Normandie, by the King's brother-in-law Charles, Duc d'Alençon, the Governor of the province. This was a time of national disaster. King Francis had lost the Battle of Pavia on 24 February, and many French nobles had been killed or captured. The King had been carried off as a prisoner to Madrid.

Probably in 1530, Jean Le Veneur followed his brother Ambroise as Abbot Commendatory of Notre-Dame de Lyre in the Diocese of Évreux. He held the abbey until ca. 1535, when he was succeeded by his grand-nephew Gabriel Le Veneur.

Le Veneur also became Count of Tillières. As Grand Almoner of France (from 1526), he was involved in many church and government projects. He also introduced Jacques Cartier to king Francis I in May 1532, before Cartier's first expedition to Canada. This brought some problems with Portugal, which interpreted Pope Alexander VI's bull of 1493 as excluding anyone but Castile and Portugal from exploration in the New World. In October 1533, during the visit of Pope Clement VII to Marseille for the marriage of Catherine de' Medici to Henri, Jean Le Veneur discussed the matter with the Pope and persuaded him that the bull applied only to those areas already discovered, not to undiscovered territories. This cleared the way for Cartier's project. That expedition set sail on 20 April 1534.

=== Cardinal Le Veneur ===
Jean Le Veneur was made a Cardinal on 7 November 1533 by Pope Clement VII in his fourteenth consistory, held in Marseille, shortly after the marriage of Clement's niece to the son of King Francis I of France. His creation was at the request of King Francis. On 10 November Le Veneur received the Titular church of San Bartolomeo all'Isola.

Also in 1533 Le Veneur was appointed Abbot Commendatory of the Abbey of S. Fuscien aux Boix in the diocese of Amiens, which he held until his death in 1543.

In 1534 the Cardinal also became involved in a political-religious dispute involving a friend of his, François Picart, a Doctor of Theology of the University of Paris and a notable preacher. He was accused before the King by some of the nobility who favored the reformed religion for stirring up the people through his preaching. Cardinal Le Veneur defended Picart, but he was opposed by the Chancellor Cardinal du Prat, by the King's Confessor Guillaume Petit, Bishop of Senlis, and by Guillaume Briconnet, Bishop of Meaux. Picart was sent to prison, interrogated on his views, and exiled. Eventually the Cardinal was able to obtain his return.

During his Cardinalate, he reorganized the statutes of the See of Paris.

On 13 March 1534 King Francis I presented Cardinal Le Veneur to the Abbey of Bec. In March 1535 the King was progressing through Normandy and was pleased to install the Cardinal in his benefice. On 23 March there was a distribution of money to the poor at the order of the King.

In 1539, seeing that the Collège Mignon was not being properly maintained, having no religious attention and having fewer bursars than the twelve which were required, the Cardinal undertook to reform the institution.

=== Death and funeral ===
In the summer of 1543 Jean Le Veneur was following the Royal Court in the King's expedition into Flanders. He caught a fever, and died on 7 or 8 August 1543, in Marle en Thiérache, Picardy. His cousin and friend Bishop Jacques d'Annebault took charge of his body, which was moved to Elbeuf on 14 August, and to Bec on the 15th, where it was kept until 3 September. His heart was encased in a lead container and buried before the High Altar of the Abbey. His remains were then transported to Lisieux. His funeral took place in the Cathedral of Saint Pierre in Lisieux, and was presided over by Louis Guyard, the Bishop of Chartres, with the assistance of the Bishop of Avranches, and with the Bishop of Luçon pronouncing the Funeral Oration; he was buried in the Cathedral of Lisieux. In 1865 the tomb was rediscovered in the Choir of the Cathedral, accompanied by a long inscription. According to another report, he was buried in the church of Saint André d'Appeville.

== Books ==
- Seguin, Richard (1832). Histoire du pays d'Auge et des évêques comtes de Lisieux... (in French). Vire: Adam.
- Porée, Adolphe André (1901). Histoire de l'abbaye du Bec (in French). Vol. Tome second. Evreux: Imprimerie de C. Hérissey.
- Bréard, Charles (1904). L'abbaye de Notre-Dame de Grestain de l'ordre de Saint-Benoit à l'ancien dioscèse de Lisieux (in French). Rouen: A. Lestringant.
- Gallia christiana: in provincias ecclesiasticas distributa (in Latin). Vol. Tomus undecimus (Vol. 11). Paris: ex Typographia regia. 1759.
- Gout, Paul (1910). Le Mont-Saint Michel: histoire de l'abbaye et de la ville, étude archéologique et architecturale des monuments... (in French). Vol. Tome I. Paris: A. Colin.
- Gout, Paul (1910). Le Mont-Saint Michel: histoire de l'abbaye et de la ville, étude archéologique et architecturale des monuments... (in French). Vol. Tome II. Paris: A. Colin.
- Gulik, Guilelmus van; Konrad Eubel (1923). L. Schmitz-Kallenberg (ed.). Hierarchia catholica medii aevi (in Latin). Vol. III (editio altera ed.). Münster: sumptibus et typis librariae Regensbergianae.
- Knecht, R. J. (1982). Francis I. Cambridge: Cambridge University Press. p. 333. ISBN 978-1-00-122391-9.
- Michon, Cédric, "Cardinals at the Court of Francis I," Martin Heale, ed. (2014). The Prelate in England and Europe, 1300-1560. Woodbridge, Suffolk UK: Boydell & Brewer Ltd. pp. 76–98. ISBN 978-1-903153-58-1.a
