= Pierre Cauchon =

15th-century Catholic bishop of Beauvais, France

His Excellency, the Most Reverend Pierre Cauchon
- Bishop of Beauvais
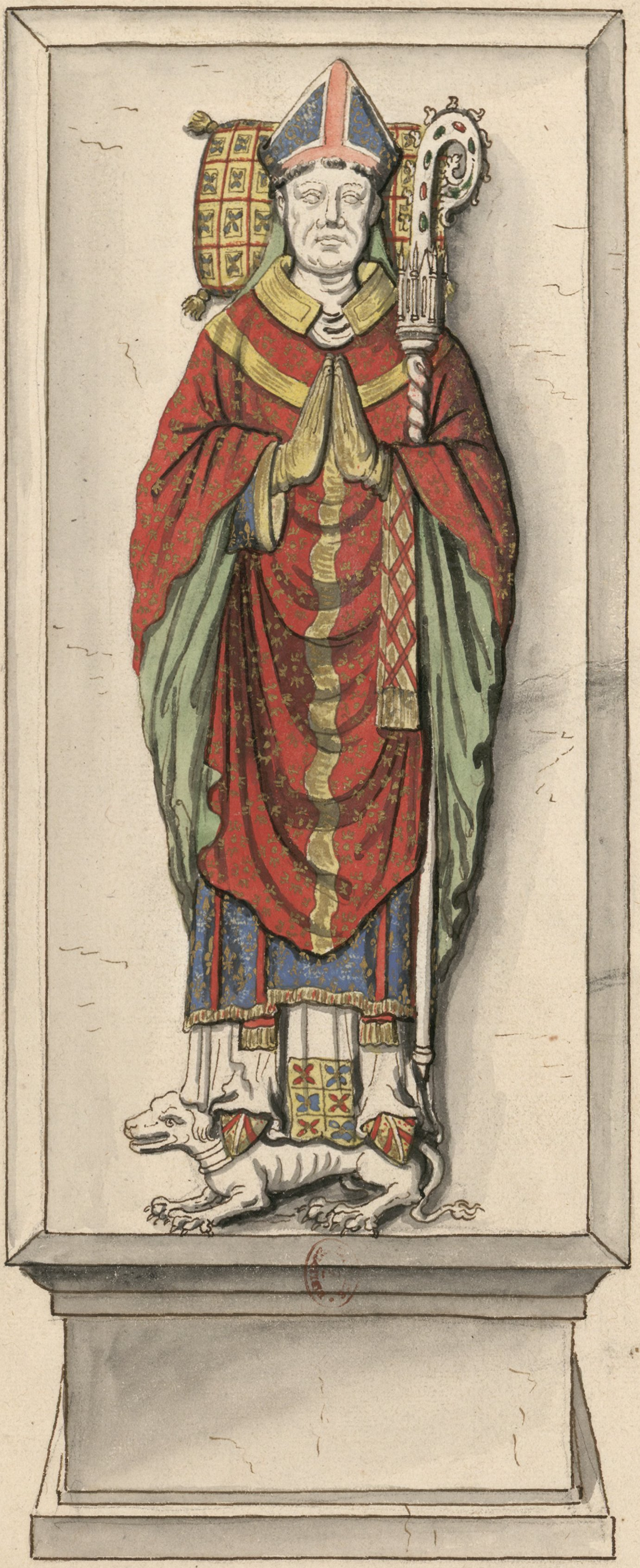
- 15th century drawing of Cauchon's tomb sculpture by François Roger de Gaignières in the Bibliothèque nationale de France
- Diocese: Beauvais
- Elected: 21 August 1420
- In office: 1420–1432
- Predecessor: Bernard de Chevenon
- Successor: Jean Juvénal des Ursins
- Other post: Bishop of Lisieux (29 January 1432 – 15 December 1442)

Orders
- Laicized: 1457

Personal details
- Born: 1371 Reims, Champagne, France
- Died: 18 December 1442 (aged 71) Rouen, Province of Normandy

Pierre Cauchon (French pronunciation: [pjɛʁ koʃɔ̃]; 1371 – 18 December 1442) was a French Catholic prelate who served as Bishop of Beauvais from 1420 to 1432. He was a partisan of Burgundian and English interests in France during the latter years of the Hundred Years' War. In 1431, he served as judge in the trial of Joan of Arc, which found her guilty of heresy, and played a key role in her execution. In 1432, he was appointed as the Bishop of Lisieux, serving until his death in 1442. He was buried in Lisieux Cathedral. The Catholic Church overturned the verdict of Joan of Arc's trial in 1456.

== Background ==
Cauchon came from a middle-class or minor noble family in Reims. He entered the clergy and attended the University of Paris, earning a licentiate in canon law in 1398. During this time, he had acquired the canonicate of Châlons and a prebendary of Égriselles. In 1403, he became rector of the university.

== Early career ==
In 1407, Cauchon was part of a mission from the crown of France to attempt to reconcile the Western Schism between the rival claimants to the papacy: Avignonian Antipope Benedict XIII and Pope Gregory XII. Although the delegation failed to achieve its goal, it raised Cauchon's prestige as a negotiator, and he became canon at both Rheims and Beauvais. Cauchon sought advancement through noble patronage. He allied himself with Duke John the Fearless of Burgundy and later his successor, Philip the Good.

Upon Cauchon's return, he found Paris in turmoil over the assassination of the Duke of Orléans under orders from John the Fearless. Many university theologians sympathized with John and published a justification of the assassination as tyrannicide by arguing that the Duke of Orléans had been planning to usurp the throne.

== The choice of the Burgundian party ==
The French Estates-General opened in 1413 to raise funds for an expected war against the English. Cauchon formed part of a commission charged with proposing sanctions and reforms. During the riots of that year he was associated with the Burgundians and the Cabochiens (radical reformers) and was later banished from Paris on May 14, 1414. The next year, Cauchon became the official ambassador of the Duke of Burgundy. Bishop Cauchon supported the election of Pope Martin V. Shortly afterward, Cauchon became archdeacon of Chartres; canon of Reims, Châlons, and Beauvais; and chaplain of the Duke of Burgundy. Cauchon took part in the royal marriage negotiations surrounding the Treaty of Troyes. He became Bishop of Beauvais in 1420.

== Alliance with the English ==
By 1423, Bishop Cauchon became King Henry VI of England's personal counsellor. He spent most of the next two years in service to the king. He returned to his diocese with the deaths of Kings Charles VI and Henry V. He departed for a visit to Reims in 1429 when Joan of Arc and the French army approached for the coronation of King Charles VII. Cauchon had always allied with the opposition to Charles VII. Shortly after the coronation, the French army threatened Cauchon's diocese. He went to Rouen, seat of the English government in France.

The English regent, the Duke of Bedford, was anxious to preserve the claim of his nephew and charge Henry VI of England, grandson of Charles VI and nephew of Charles VII, to the throne of France, as per the Treaty of Troyes. Cauchon escorted Henry from London to Rouen as part of a clerical delegation. Shortly after he returned, he learned that Joan of Arc had been taken captive near Compiègne. The Burgundians held her at the keep of Beaulieu near Saint-Quentin.

Cauchon played a leading role in negotiations to gain Joan of Arc from the Burgundians for the English. He was well paid for his efforts. Cauchon claimed jurisdiction to try her case because Compiègne was in his diocese of Beauvais.

== The trial of Joan of Arc ==
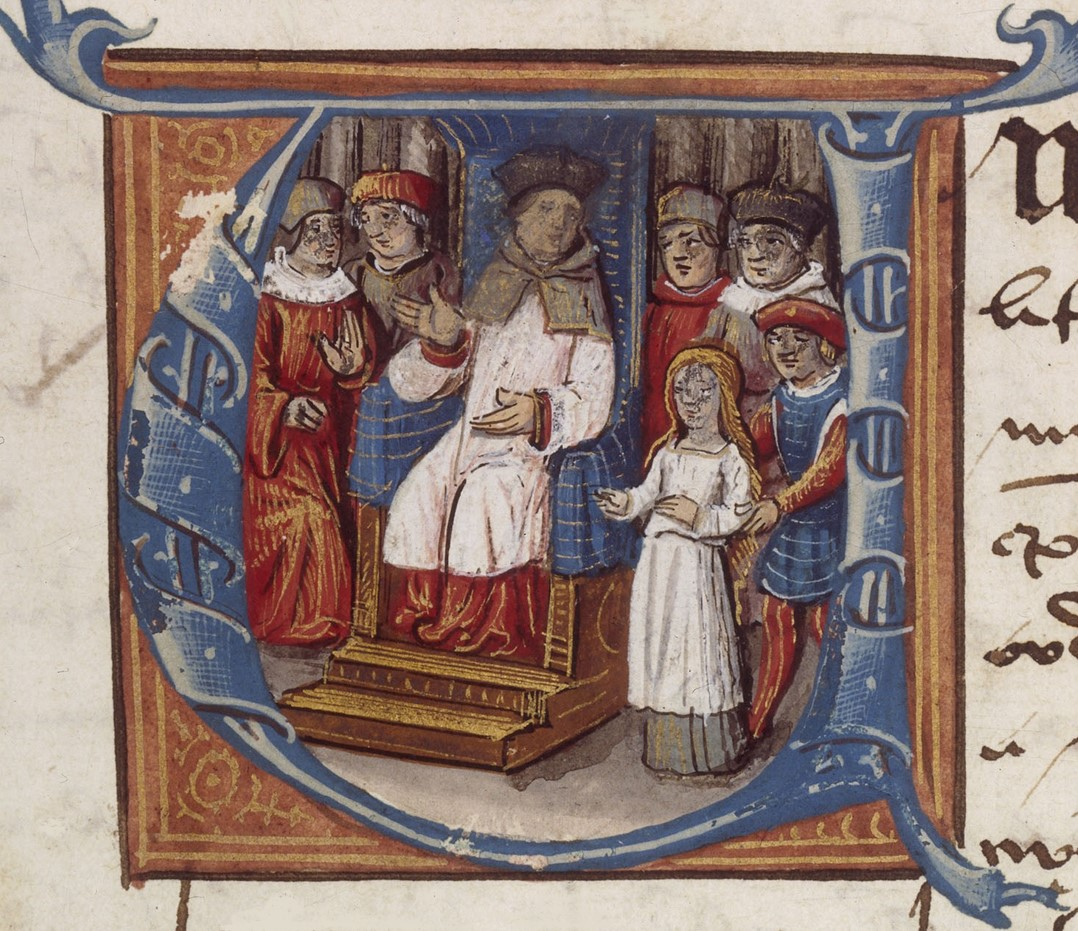
Miniature of Pierre Cauchon presiding at Joan of Arc's trial, unknown author (15th century, Bibliothèque nationale de France)

The goal of Joan of Arc's trial was to discredit her, and by implication to discredit the king she had crowned. Cauchon organized events carefully with a number of ecclesiastics, many of whom came from the pro-English University of Paris. The trial opened on 21 February 1431. Concerned for the regularity of the proceeding, Bishop Cauchon forwarded a bill of indictment to Paris in order to obtain the opinion of university clerics, who agreed with the charges. In the meantime, the trial continued. Joan was unwilling to testify on several subjects. The court considered torturing her. The court proceeded to official admonition on the field of the abbey of Saint-Ouen. As Cauchon read her sentence of condemnation, she agreed to abjure. Shortly afterward she recanted and was burned at the stake on 30 May 1431.

== New appointment ==
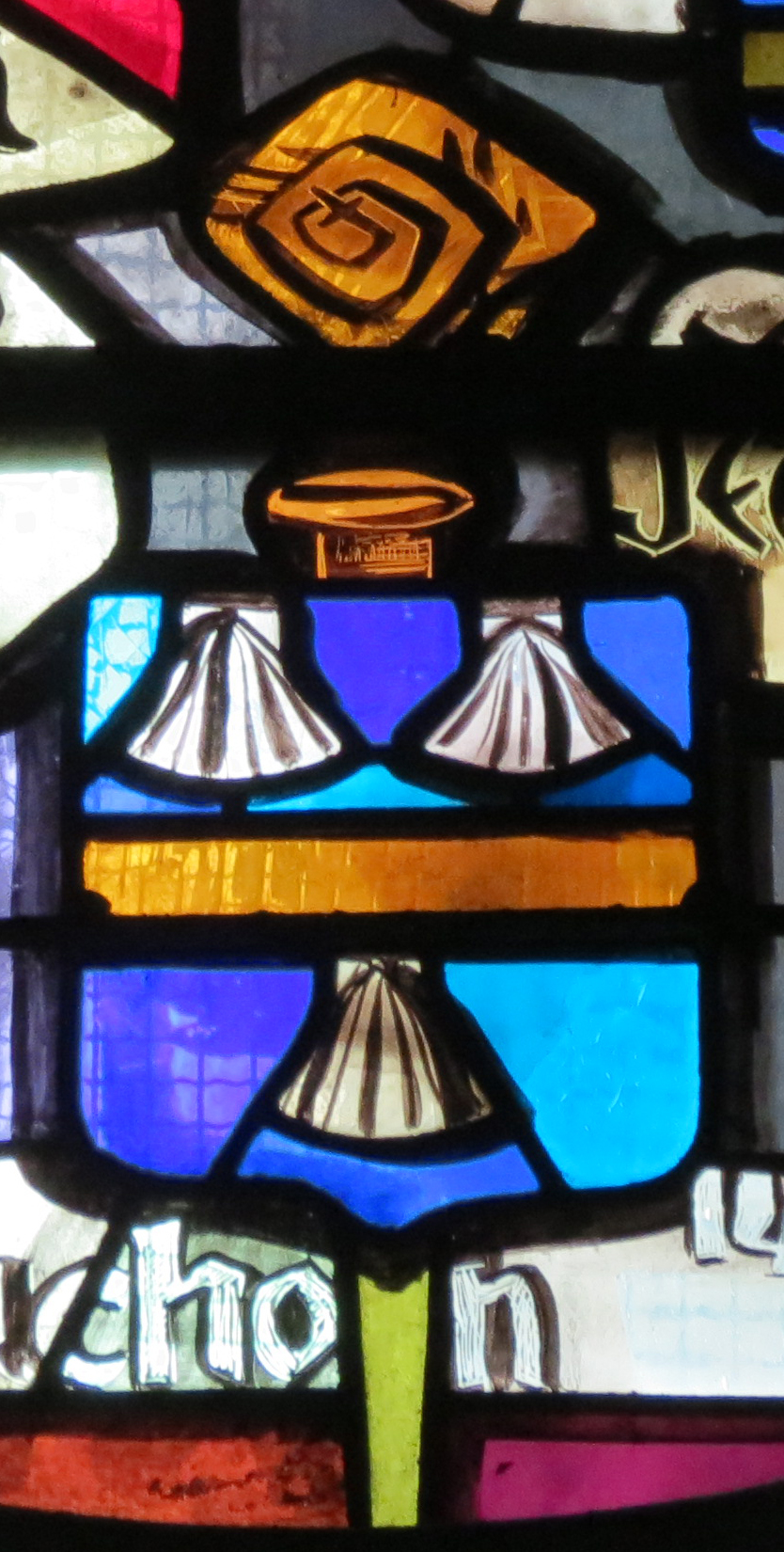
Stain glass image of Cauchon's coat of arms at Cathédrale Saint-Pierre de Lisieux

Cauchon could not hope to go back to Beauvais, which had fallen under French control. He was interested in a vacancy at the archbishop's palace at Rouen. Facing determined opposition, he gave up that project. In December, Cauchon accompanied the Cardinal of Winchester to crown the boy king Henry VI of England as King of France in Notre-Dame Cathedral in Paris. Finally, he obtained an appointment as Bishop of Lisieux (29 January 1432 – 15 December 1442).

When Constable Arthur de Richemont returned to favour with King Charles VII of France in 1436, Cauchon went as ambassador to the Council of Basel. He was active for the unsuccessful English side in the peace negotiations that ended in reconciliation between the French and the Burgundians.

Cauchon divided his later years between his new diocese and a residence in Rouen. His last action was to finance construction of a vault at the cathedral of Saint-Pierre de Lisieux. Cauchon died abruptly of heart failure at the age of 71 on 15 December 1442 in Rouen. He was buried in Lisieux Cathedral beneath the vault he had patronized. There is not any marking that indicates the exact location of his burial site, but his skeleton was re-discovered with his crozier and ring during a renovation of the pavement of the vault in 1931. When the renovation works were finished, no markings were added. (Note: George Bernard Shaw in his 1923 play Saint Joan incorrectly states that Cauchon's body was dug up and thrown into a sewer; it was Jean d'Estivet, one of the promoters of the trial, who was found dead in a sewer.)

== See also ==
- Inquisition
- Middle Ages
- History of France
