= Joan of Arc (1900 film) =

1900 French film

Jeanne d'Arc
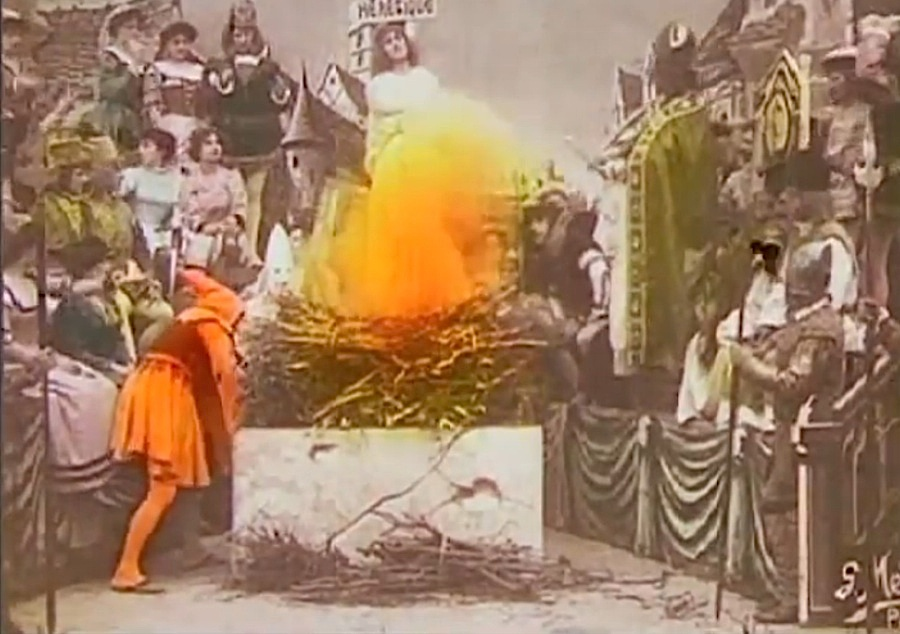
- Joan burning at the stake at the climax of the film
- Directed by: Georges Méliès
- Written by: Georges Méliès
- Produced by: Georges Méliès
- Starring: Jeanne Calvière; Georges Méliès; Jeanne d'Alcy
- Cinematography: Leclerc
- Production company: Star Film Company
- Release date: 1900
- Running time: 10 minutes
- Country: France
- Language: Silent

Joan of Arc (French: Jeanne d'Arc) is a 1900 French silent film directed by Georges Méliès, based on the life of Joan of Arc.

== Plot ==
In the village of Domrémy, the young Joan is visited by Saint Michael, Saint Catherine, and Saint Margaret, who exhort her to fight for her country. Her father Jacques d'Arc, mother Isabelle Romée, and uncle beg her to stay at home, but she leaves them and travels to Vaucouleurs, where she meets with the governor, Captain Robert de Baudricourt. The dissipated Baudricourt initially scorns Joan's ideals, but her zeal eventually wins him over, and he gives her authority to lead French soldiers. Joan and her army lead a triumphal procession into Orléans, followed by a large crowd. Then, in Reims Cathedral, Charles VII is crowned King of France.

At the Siege of Compiègne, Joan is taken prisoner while her army attempts to storm the castle. In prison, Joan has another dream in which she sees her visions again. Taken to the interrogation, Joan refuses to sign a retraction, and is condemned as a heretic. In the Rouen marketplace, Joan is burned at the stake. The wood carrier at the execution, bringing in fuel for the burning, dies on the spot from the fumes. In a final apotheosis scene, Joan rises to heaven, where she is greeted by God and the saints.

== Cast ==
- Jeanne Calvière as Joan of Arc. According to a later account by Georges Méliès, Calvière was principal dancer at the Trianon-Lyrique in Paris and performed under the Italianized stage name “Mlle Calviéri”. For the Battle of Compiègne horseback scene, she was replaced by an unnamed equestrian from the Cirque d'Hiver. Méliès further stated that Calvière remained part of his troupe for nineteen years.
- Georges Méliès in seven roles: Jeanne's father; Jeanne's uncle; Robert de Baudricourt; a beggar at the Orléans procession; a soldier at the Siege of Compiègne; one of Joan's jailers; and the wood carrier at the execution.
- Jeanne d'Alcy in three roles: Jeanne's mother; a lady at Vaucouleurs; and a lady at Orléans.

== Production ==
The surviving print of the film

The film was made in the spring of 1900. It was the first of Méliès's films to surpass 200 meters in length, and the second (after his Cinderella the previous year) to use changes of scene, with twelve sets employed and that number of scenes, or tableaux, advertised. (Cinderella was advertised as having twenty tableaux, but they were filmed on only six sets; this division of long scenes into smaller segments for advertising purposes would become Méliès's standard practice. Joan of Arc, by contrast, was advertised with twelve scenes, one per set.) The artist Charles Claudel, who also repainted the interior of the Théâtre Robert-Houdin in 1901 following Méliès's designs, was the set painter for the film. The cameraman was Leclerc, who also worked for Méliès as the pianist at the Théâtre Robert-Houdin.

Méliès's scenario for the film strongly emphasizes Joan's status as a national hero of France and a martyr for the French people; the first scene, in which Joan enters leading a flock of sheep, foreshadows her eventual leading of the French army. The final scene, with its triumphal entry of Joan into heaven and her meeting God, suggests Joan's suitability for Catholic sainthood. (Joan of Arc was beatified by the Church in 1909 and canonized in 1920.)

Most of the film is staged in Méliès's usual theatrical style, with a stationary camera viewing the action from afar, in a long shot, as if viewing a stage spectacle from a seat in the audience. However, the eighth scene, the Siege of Compiègne, is notable for a more modern-looking visual effect: in that scene, actors move much closer to the camera, in the distance of a medium shot. This is the second example, among Méliès's extant films, of experiments with medium shots; the first had occurred the previous year in Bagarre entre journalistes, an installment of Méliès's series The Dreyfus Affair.

An advertisement for the film claims that "almost 500 people" can be seen in the grand parade at Orléans, an effect created by having a moderately sized group of people cross the screen from left to right, go around the north side of the studio, and re-enter, repeating the cycle several times to simulate a much larger crowd.

== Release and survival ==
Joan of Arc was released by Méliès's Star Film Company and is numbered 264–275 in its catalogues, where it was advertised as a pièce cinématographique à grand spectacle en 12 tableaux. As the film scholar Jacques Malthête has noted, Méliès's descriptions of the film in advertising material never mention that Joan's enemies are English; this omission occurs not only in the English-language materials (where mentioning conflict with the French may have been thought harmful to sales), but also in the French ones (where the omission is less understandable).

The film was Méliès's second big cinematic success (Cinderella was the first). It was shown widely in France, and was also exhibited elsewhere, including in Montreal and Havana. In England, the film was distributed by the Warwick Trading Company, which handled English releases of Méliès's films until 1902. In the United States, the Edison Manufacturing Company sold "dupes" (illegally duplicated prints) of the film. American film piracy became such a problem for Méliès, especially after the success of his much-pirated 1902 film A Trip to the Moon, that he opened an American branch of his company in New York in 1903, under the direction by his brother Gaston Méliès, for added copyright protection.

The film was believed lost until 1982, when a hand-colored print with the first scene missing was discovered by the collector René Charles.

== See also ==
- Cultural depictions of Joan of Arc
- List of films about angels
