= Joan of Arc (miniseries) =

1999 Canadian television miniseries

- DVD cover
- Genre: Historical drama; Biography; Adventure
- Written by: Michael Alexander Miller; Ronald Parker
- Directed by: Christian Duguay
- Starring: Leelee Sobieski; Chad Willett; Peter O'Toole; Jacqueline Bisset; Powers Boothe; Neil Patrick Harris; Maximilian Schell; Maury Chaykin; Olympia Dukakis; Jonathan Hyde; Robert Loggia; Peter Strauss; Shirley MacLaine
- Composers: Asher Ettinger; Tony Kosinec; Charlotte Church (special vocals)
- Country of origin: Canada
- Original language: English
- No. of episodes: 2

Production
- Executive producers: Graham Flashner; Ed Gernon; Peter Sussman
- Producer: Peter Bray
- Cinematography: Pierre Gill
- Editor: Ralph Brunjes
- Running time: 140 minutes 180 minutes (uncut version)
- Production companies: CBC; Alliance Atlantis Communications

Original release
- Network: CBS (United States); CBC (Canada)
- Release: May 16 – May 18, 1999

Joan of Arc is a 1999 Canadian two-part television miniseries about the 15th-century Catholic saint of the same name. The miniseries stars Leelee Sobieski as Saint Joan. A joint production of the CBC and Alliance Atlantis Communications, it was shown internationally in 1999.

The miniseries received thirteen Primetime Emmy Awards nominations and four Golden Globe Award nominations.

== Plot ==
The miniseries tells the story of Joan of Arc, from her birth in 1412 until her death at (approx.) 19 in 1431.

Joan of Arc is born in 1412 in the village of Domrémy, at the height of the Hundred Years' War. During her youth, she often witnesses the horrors inflicted by both the English and French forces, and when 11 years old she starts hearing divine voices. Her spirit is kept high by the legend of the "Maiden of Lorraine", which states that a young woman, guided by God, will unite France and end the war.

At 17, Joan's village is invaded and burned, and her blind best friend, Emile, killed. She begs God to tell her what she said to deserve this, and the visions come back, telling her to find Charles, the flippant young prince who has neglected his duty, and place him on the throne of France.

Joan leaves her small village to find Charles. She jumps into a livestock cart that is supposedly being taken to the king. Instead, she is taken to Vaucouleurs, where the disbelieving locals refuse to help her to get to Charles. Starving and alone, she finds refuge with a sympathetic nun, who helps her unite the people of Vaucoleurs and build defenses against the English and their Burgundian allies. With this unification and defense work, rumor starts spreading that Joan is the Maid of Lorraine.

Although Joan doesn't seem to believe that she is The Maid, she goes along with it to give the people hope. The lord of Vaucouleurs finally accepts Joan's claims and gives her an escort, a suit of armor, and an introduction to Charles and his court. Joan further demonstrates her gifts when Charles, in an act of spite, attempts to humiliate her by switching identities with one of his couriers; she sees through the imposter's disguise and bows before Charles, declaring that he is the true king.

== Cast ==
- Leelee Sobieski as Joan d'Arc
- Jacqueline Bisset as Isabelle d'Arc
- Powers Boothe as Jacques d'Arc
- Neil Patrick Harris as King Charles VII of France/The Dauphin
- Maury Chaykin as Sir Robert de Baudricourt
- Olympia Dukakis as Mother Babette
- Jonathan Hyde as Duke of Bedford
- Robert Loggia as Father Monet
- Shirley MacLaine as Madame de Beaurevoir
- Peter O'Toole as Bishop Pierre Cauchon
- Maximilian Schell as Brother Jean le Maistre
- Peter Strauss as La Hire
- Chad Willett as Jean de Metz
- Ron White as Jean de Dunois
- Jaimz Woolvett as Duke of Burgundy (as Jaimz Wolvett)
- Ted Atherton as Jean d'Estivet
- Robert Haley as Georges de la Trémoille
- Matt Hoffman as Raymond
- Justin Peroff as Pierre d'Arc
- Chandra Engstrom as Young Joan

== Awards and nominations ==
| Year | Association | Category | Nominee(s) | Result |
|---|---|---|---|---|
| 1999 | Primetime Emmy Awards | Outstanding Art Direction for a Miniseries or a Movie | Michael Joy, Shannon Grover, Martin Martinec | Nominated |
| 1999 | Primetime Emmy Awards | Outstanding Casting for a Miniseries, Movie, or a Special | Deirdre Bowen, Susan Glicksman, Fern Orenstein | Nominated |
| 1999 | Primetime Emmy Awards | Outstanding Costumes for a Miniseries, Movie or a Special | John Hay | Nominated |
| 1999 | Primetime Emmy Awards | Outstanding Directing for a Miniseries, Movie or a Dramatic Special | Christian Duguay | Nominated |
| 1999 | Primetime Emmy Awards | Outstanding Lead Actress in a Miniseries or a Movie | Leelee Sobieski | Nominated |
| 1999 | Primetime Emmy Awards | Outstanding Miniseries | Joan of Arc | Nominated |
| 1999 | Primetime Emmy Awards | Outstanding Supporting Actor in a Miniseries or a Movie | Peter O'Toole | Won |
| 1999 | Primetime Emmy Awards | Outstanding Supporting Actress in a Miniseries or a Movie | Jacqueline Bisset | Nominated |
| 1999 | Primetime Emmy Awards | Outstanding Supporting Actress in a Miniseries or a Movie | Olympia Dukakis | Nominated |
| 1999 | Television Critics Association Awards | Outstanding Achievement in Movies, Miniseries and Specials | | Won |
| 2000 | Golden Globe Awards | Best Miniseries or Television Film | Joan of Arc | Nominated |
| 2000 | Golden Globe Awards | Best Actress – Miniseries or Television Film | Leelee Sobieski | Nominated |
| 2000 | Golden Globe Awards | Best Supporting Actor – Series, Miniseries or Television Film | Peter O'Toole | Nominated |
| 2000 | Golden Globe Awards | Best Supporting Actress – Series, Miniseries or Television Film | Jacqueline Bisset | Nominated |
| 2000 | Satellite Awards | Best Actress – Miniseries or Television Film | Leelee Sobieski | Nominated |
| 2000 | Satellite Awards | Best Miniseries | Joan of Arc | Nominated |
