= Trial of Joan of Arc =

1431 trial and execution of French saint

- Part of the Hundred Years' War
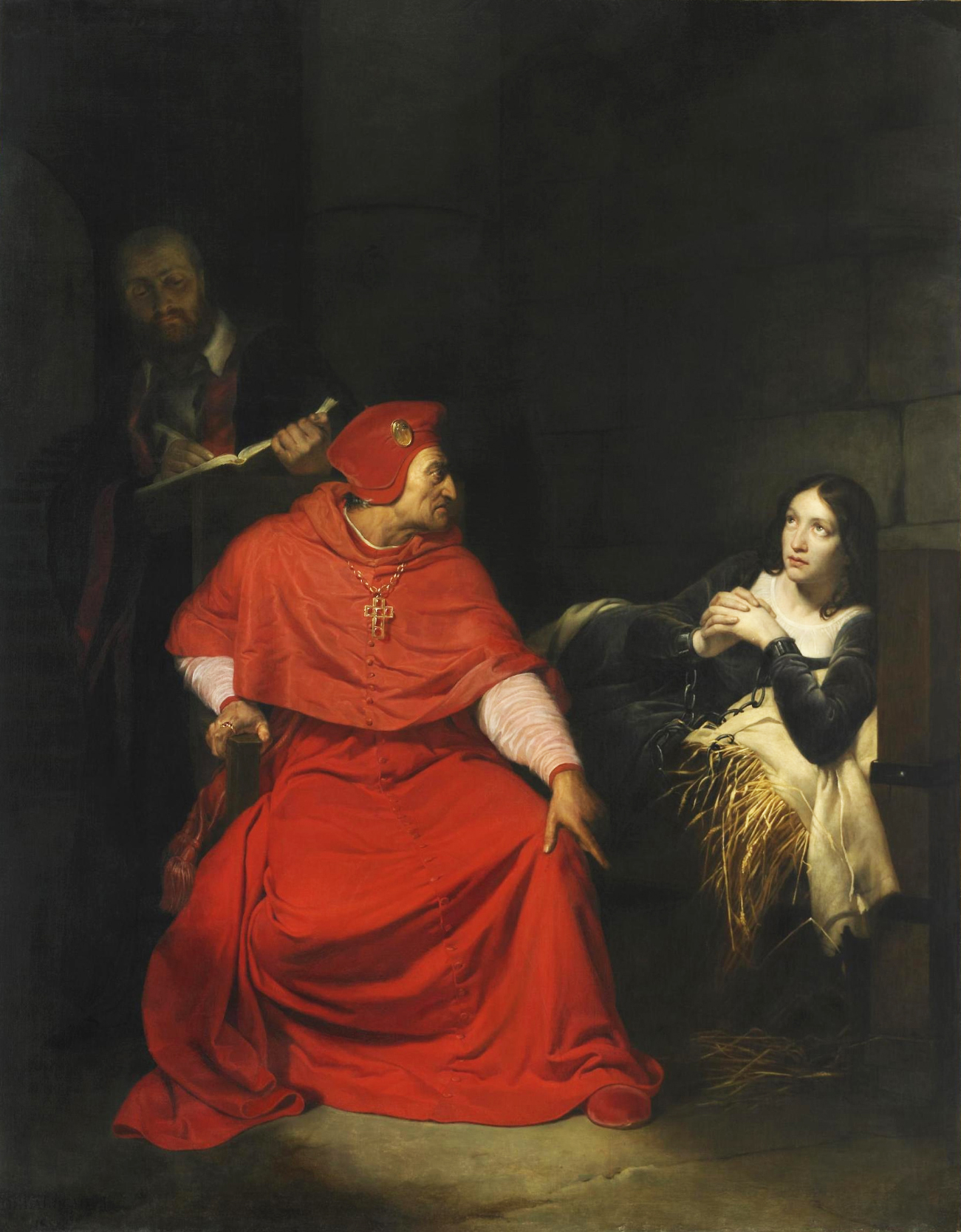
- Joan of Arc is interrogated by The Cardinal of Winchester in her prison, 1431. Painting by Paul Delaroche (1797–1856), Musée des Beaux-Arts de Rouen.
- Native name: Jeanne d'Arc
- Date: 9 January – 29 May 1431
- Duration: Four and a half months
- Location: Rouen, Normandy, France
- Cause: English defeat at Compiègne
- Outcome: Guilty
- Accused: yes
- Convicted: Yes
- Charges: Heresy
- Verdict: Joan of Arc found guilty of heresy
- Sentence: Death by burning

The trial of Joan of Arc, a French military leader under Charles VII during the Hundred Years' War, began on 9 January 1431 and ended with her execution on 30 May. The trial is one of the most famous in history, becoming the subject of many books and films.

Joan was captured during the siege of Compiègne in 1430 by Burgundian forces and subsequently sold to their English allies. She was prosecuted by a pro-English ecclesiastical court at Rouen in 1431. The court found her guilty of heresy and she was burned at the stake. The verdict was later nullified at a rehabilitation trial, which was overseen by the inquisitor general Jean Bréhal in 1456. Considered a French national heroine, Joan was declared a saint by the Catholic Church in 1920.

== Background and context ==
In the spring of 1429, acting in obedience to what she said was the command of God, Joan of Arc inspired the Dauphin's armies in a series of military victories which included the lifting of the siege of Orléans and defeat of a large English army at the Battle of Patay, reversing the course of the Hundred Years' War. The Dauphin was crowned a few months later at Reims as Charles VII of France.

Joan, having completed her mission, prepared to return home to Domremy. Before she could go, she was asked by the newly crowned king to continue fighting for France, and she agreed. What was a string of victories before became a series of military setbacks that eventually led to her capture. First, there was a reversal before the gates of Paris in September of that same year. Then, she was captured in May 1430 in the siege of Compiègne by the Burgundian faction led by Philip the Good, Duke of Burgundy, who was allied with the English.

The Burgundians delivered her to the English in exchange for 10,000 francs. King Charles did not attempt to retrieve her. In December of that same year, she was transferred to Rouen, the military headquarters and administrative capital in France of Henry VI of England, and placed on trial for heresy before a Church court headed by pro-English Bishop Pierre Cauchon, in efforts to illegitimize King Charles's crowning.

== Documentary record ==
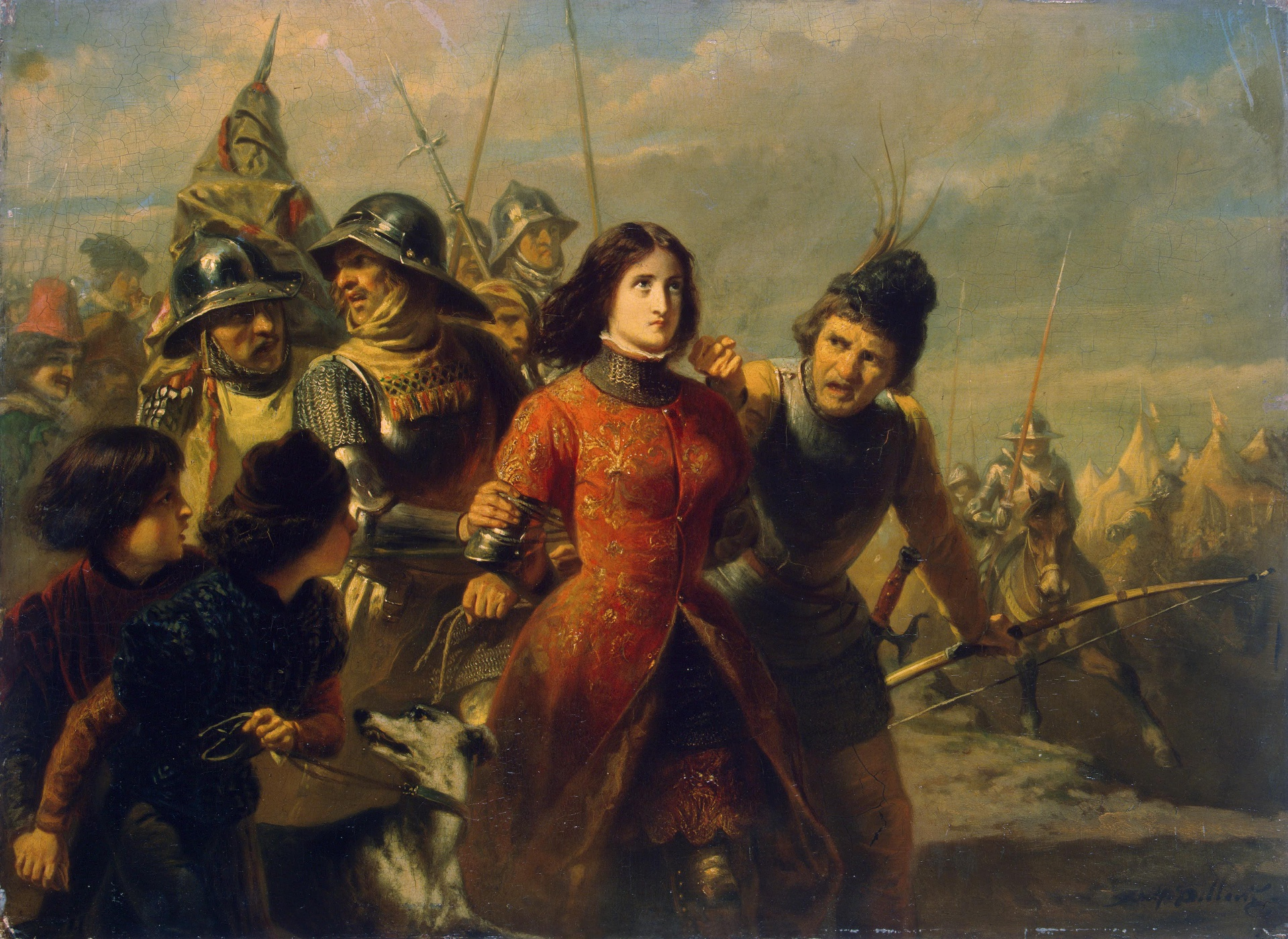
Capture of Joan of Arc by Adolf Alexander Dillens (c. 1850)

During the trial in 1431, three notaries headed by Guillaume Manchon independently recorded the proceedings and collated them each day following the trial session. These records were originally written in Middle French but were translated into Latin by Manchon and University of Paris master Thomas de Courcelles about four years after the trial. Five copies were produced, three of which are still in existence.

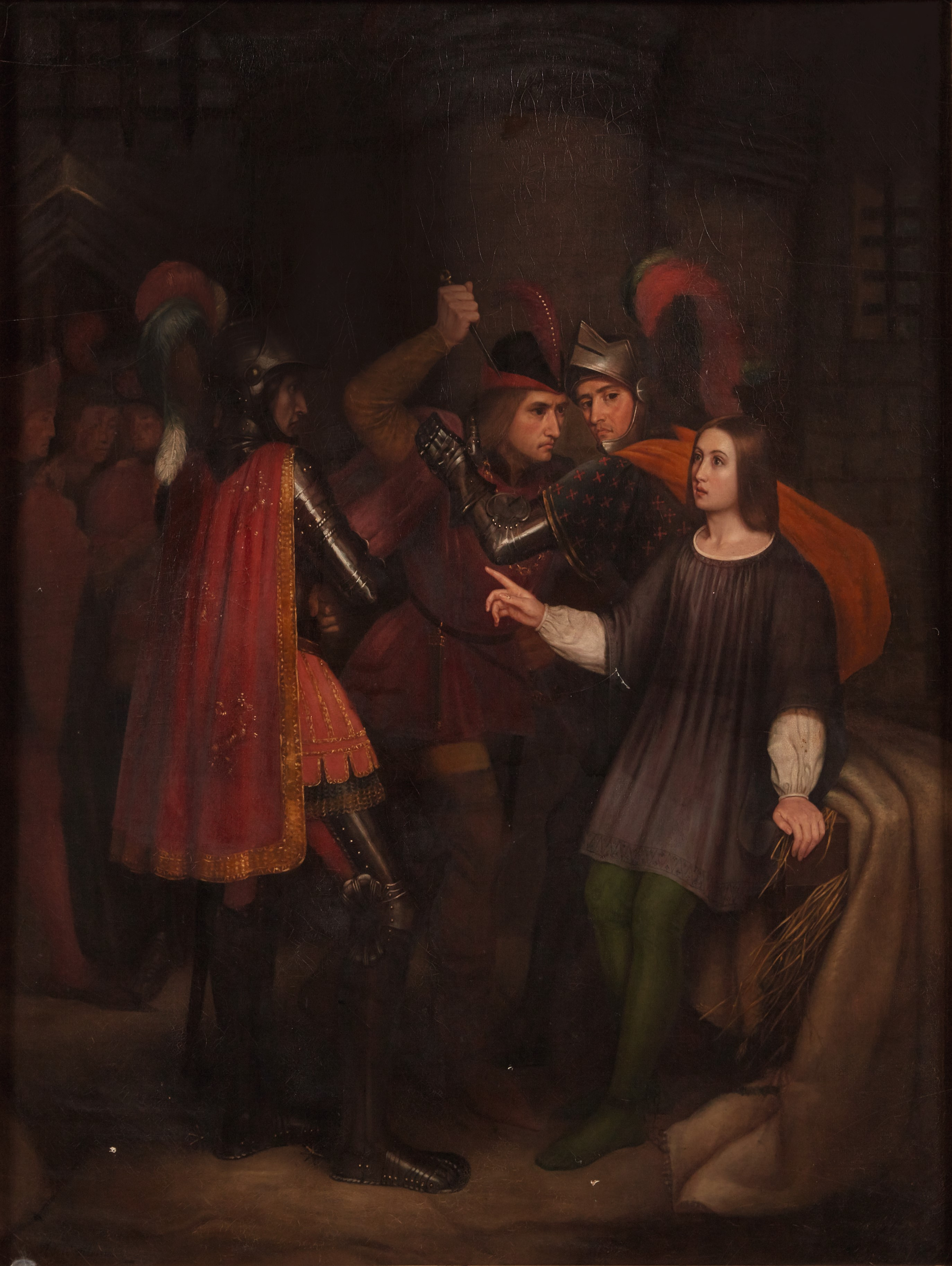
The Arrest of Joan of Arc by Adele Martin (1835)

The lengthy investigations and appellate trial during the 1450s produced additional information about the details and behind-the-scenes activity during the process, since the 115 witnesses questioned during these investigations included many of the clergymen who had served during the trial in 1431. They gave vivid memories of many incidents that are not recorded in the trial transcript, and described how the English government had manipulated the affair.

Jules Quicherat published the first unabridged version of the trial record in the first volume of his five-volume series Procès de condamnation et de réhabilitation de Jeanne d'Arc in Paris in the 1840s. But it was not until 1932 that the first unabridged English translation became available when W.P. Barrett published his Trial of Joan of Arc in New York City.

== In prison ==
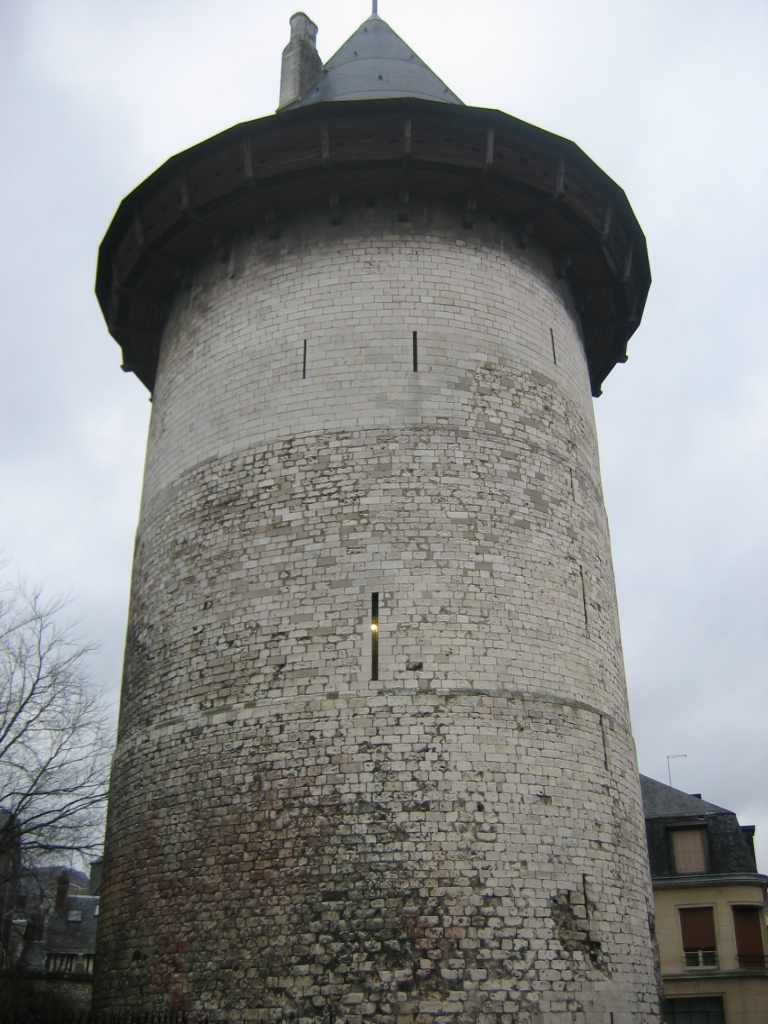
The keep of the castle of Rouen, surviving remnant of the fortress where Joan was imprisoned during her trial. It has since become known as the "Joan of Arc Tower".

The procedures of an Inquisitorial trial called for a preliminary investigation into the life of the suspect. This investigation consisted of the collection of any evidence about the character of the subject, including witness testimony. This could then be followed by an interrogation of the accused, in which they were compelled to provide testimony which could then be used against them in a subsequent trial.

=== Preliminary inquiry ===
With the words "Here begin the proceedings in matters of faith against a deceased woman, Joan, commonly known as the Maid", the trial transcript announces the start, on January 9, 1431, of the judicial inquiry into the case of Joan of Arc (Jeanne d'Arc as her name appears at the head of said records).

The first order of business was a preliminary inquiry into Joan's character and habits. An examination as to Joan's virginity was conducted some time prior to January 13, overseen by the Duchess of Bedford (the wife of John, Duke of Bedford, regent in France of the boy-king Henry II of France, VI of England). The Duchess announced that Joan had been found to be a virgin. At the same time, representatives of the judge were sent to Joan's home village of Domrémy and vicinity to inquire further into Joan's life, her habits, and virtue, with several witnesses being interviewed.

The result of these inquiries was that nothing could be found against Joan to support any charges against her. The man who was commissioned to collect testimony, Nicolas Bailly, said that he "had found nothing concerning Joan that he would not have liked to find about his own sister". This angered Cauchon, who was hoping for something he could use against her. He accused Bailly of being "a traitor and a bad man" and refused to pay him his promised salary.

=== Interrogation ===
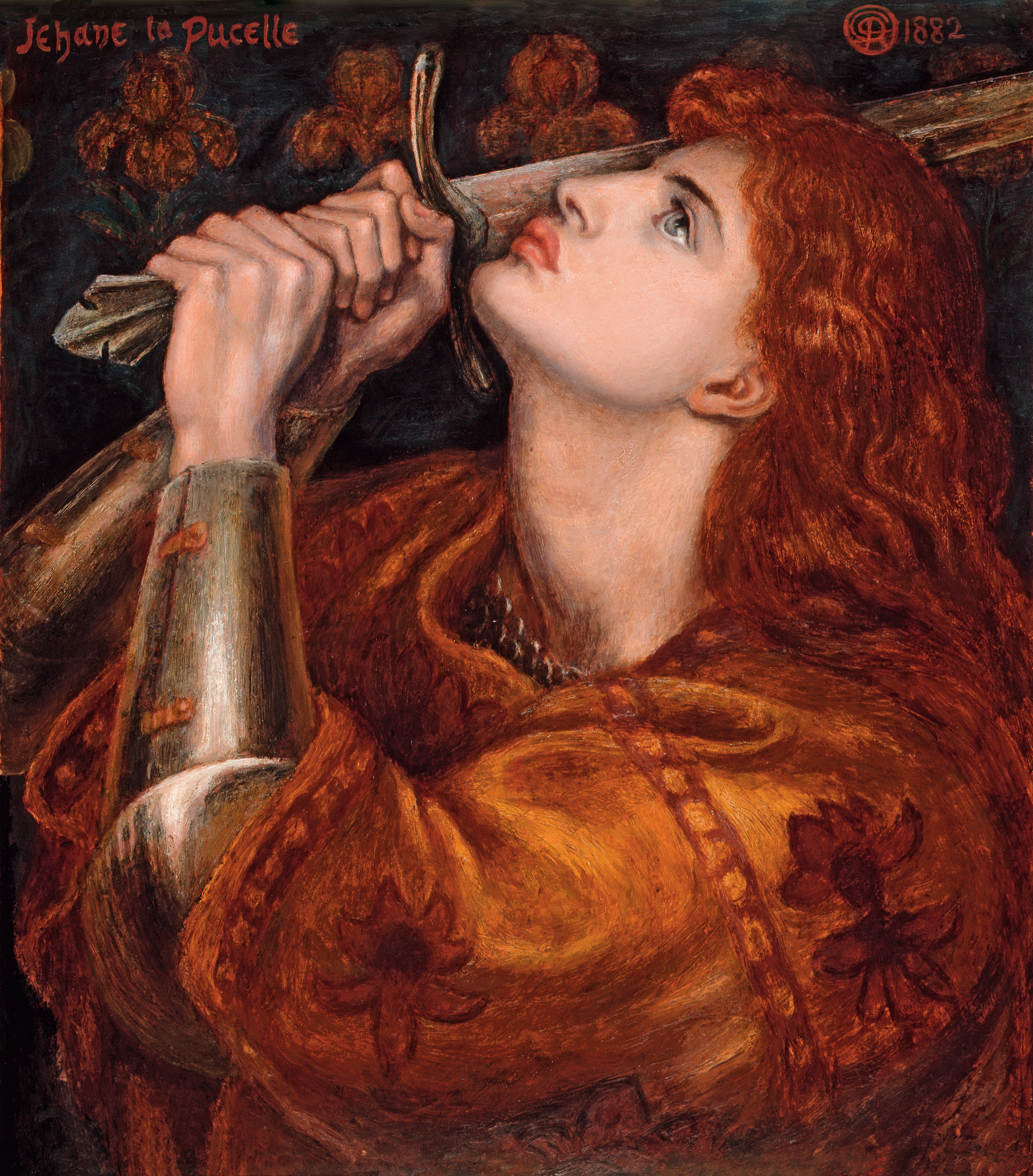
Joan of Arc (1882) by Dante Gabriel Rossetti (1828–1882)

In a letter dated 20 February 1431 sent to the assessors and others summoning them to appear the morning of the following day for the first public interrogation session of Joan, Pierre Cauchon cited the grant of jurisdiction within the city of Rouen by the chapter of the cathedral of Rouen for the purpose of conducting the trial against Joan. Without such a grant, he would have been unable to conduct the hearings as he was not in his native diocese. He also stated that Joan was "vehemently suspected of heresy" and that "rumors of her acts and sayings wounding our faith had notoriously spread." This was the basis for the diffamatio, a necessary requirement for bringing charges against a suspect. He also alluded to the expected absence of the Vice-Inquisitor for Rouen, Jean Le Maistre, whose presence was required by canon law in order to validate the proceedings. One witness in the rehabilitation trial, which was held over 20 years later, stated that Le Maistre had to be threatened to ensure his attendance at the trial. The inquisitor at the rehabilitation trial later declared these points to be violations of the Church's rules.

In response to the summons of Bishop Cauchon on this same date, priest and bailiff Jean Massieu reported that Joan had agreed to appear in court, but she requested that ecclesiastics of the French side be summoned equal in number to those of the English party (as required by the Church's rules), and she asked that she should be allowed to hear Mass. In response, promoter (prosecutor) Jean d'Estivet forbade Joan to attend, citing "especially the impropriety of the garments to which she clung" according to the Trial transcript (Barrett translation). Her soldier's clothing increasingly became an issue as the trial progressed and the tribunal failed to find other grounds for a conviction.

==== First session: Wednesday, February 21, 1431 ====
After being brought before the court, the proceedings were explained to Joan and an exhortation was delivered to her by Bishop Cauchon, following which she was required to take an oath concerning her testimony.

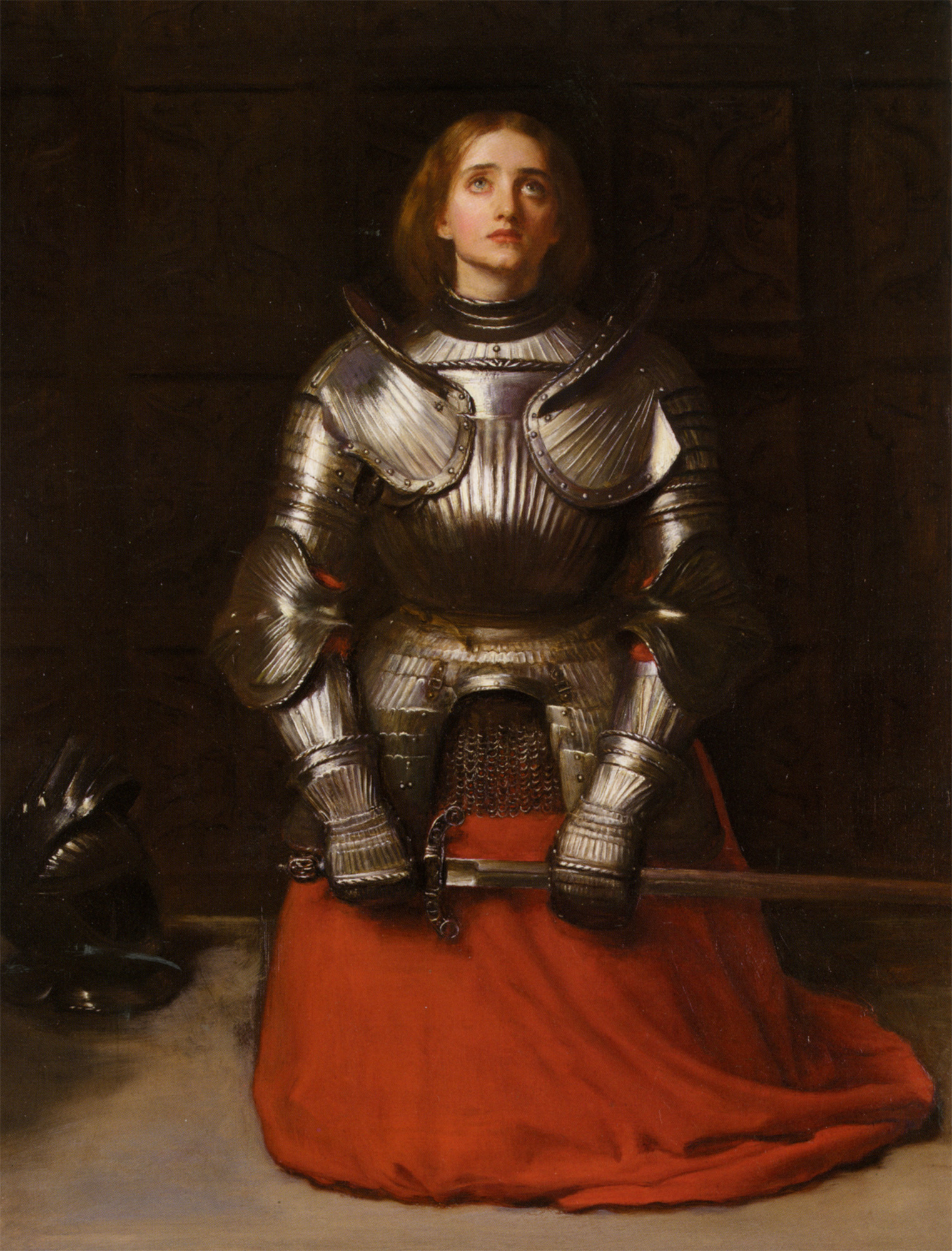
Oil painting, on canvas, of Joan of Arc wearing a suit of armor over a red skirt. Joan of Arc by John Everett Millais and published in 1865.

Question: Do you swear to speak the truth in answer to such questions as are put to you?

Joan: I do not know what you wish to examine me on. Perhaps you might ask such things that I would not tell.

Question: Will you swear to speak the truth upon those things which are asked you concerning the faith, which you know?

Joan: Concerning my father and my mother, and what I have done since I took the road to France, I will gladly swear to tell the truth. But concerning my revelations from God, these I have never told or revealed to anyone, save only to Charles, my King. And I will not reveal them to save my head. (Note: All Trial quotations are from the English translation of the Trial transcripts by W.P. Barrett. In places, the dialogue has been rendered into direct discourse where the Trial transcript recorded only indirect discourse.)

The court returned to the matter of the oath in subsequent sessions.

She was then asked concerning matters such as her name, her birth, her parents and godparents, her baptism, and her religious upbringing. When she reported that her mother had taught her the standard Catholic prayers—the Pater Noster ("Our Father" or "Lord's Prayer"), Ave Maria ("Hail Mary"), and the Credo ("Apostles' Creed")—Cauchon asked her to recite the Pater Noster. She replied that she would do so only if she were allowed to be heard in Confession.

Finally, reminding her of her previous escape attempts, Joan was admonished against escaping, being told that if she were to do so, she would automatically be convicted of heresy. She rejected this, saying that she had given no oath regarding this matter to anyone and adding, "It is true that I wished and still wish to escape, as is lawful for any captive or prisoner."

==== Second session: Thursday, February 22, 1431 ====
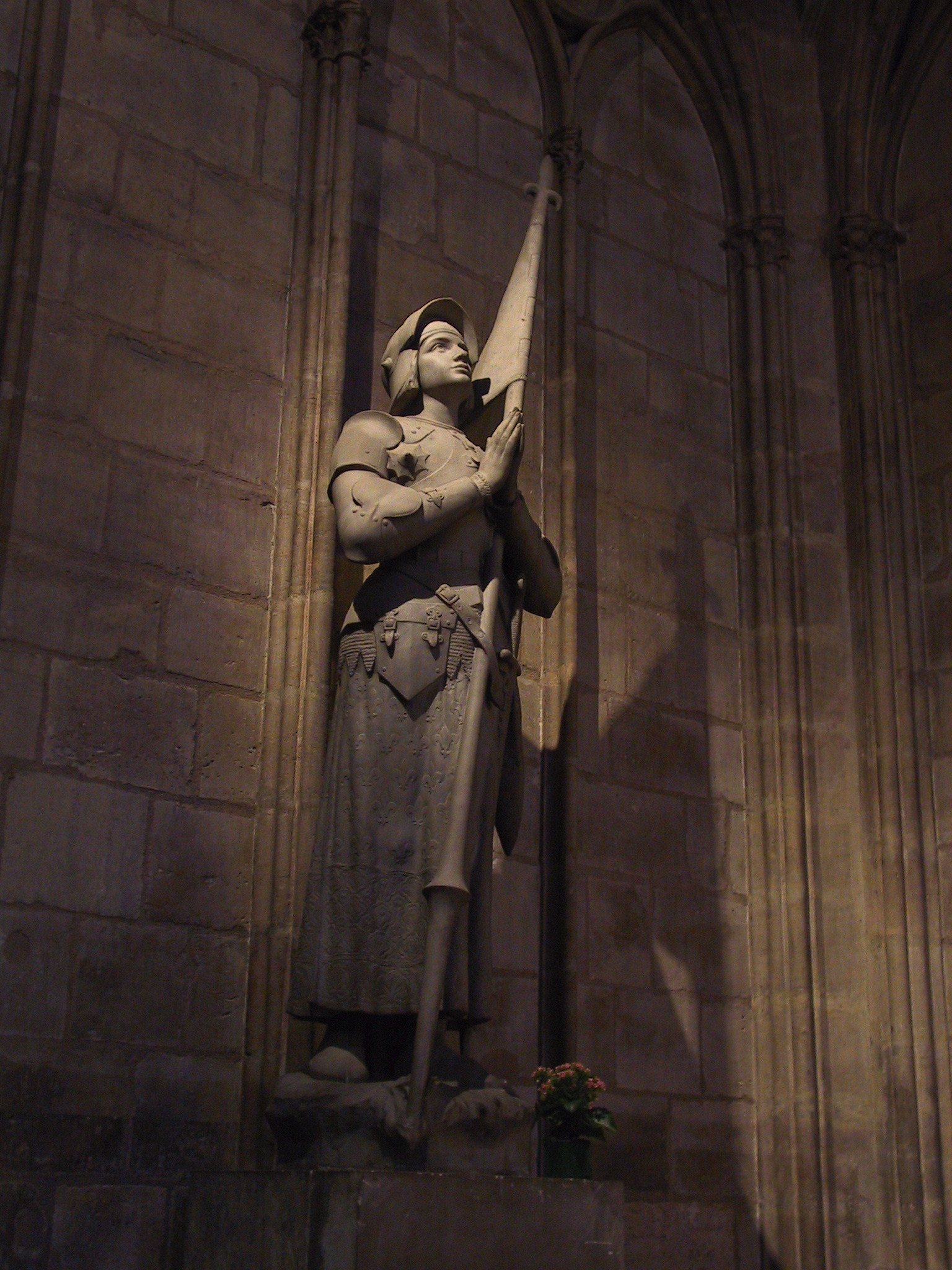
Statue of Joan of Arc in Notre-Dame de Paris cathedral interior, Paris

At this session Jean Lemaitre the Vice-Inquisitor was finally present, after having tried to avoid attendance. He was not present at the following sessions until March 13, and he subsequently spent virtually no time on the case throughout the course of the trial. (Note: Pernoud, Régine. "Joan of Arc By Herself and Her Witnesses", p. 165. The Papal Commission appointed a quarter of a century later to examine the conduct of the original Trial would here too fault the proceedings of this trial.)

After some further sparring over the oath, Joan was questioned about her youth and activities in Domrémy. She replied that she had learned to "spin [wool] and to sew", that she "confessed her sins once a year", sometimes more often, and "received the sacrament of the Eucharist at Easter". The questioning then took a more serious turn as the issue of her visions was taken up.

She stated that at the age of twelve or thirteen, she "had a voice from God to help and guide me", but that at first she "was much afraid". She added that the voice was "seldom heard without a light" and that she "often heard the voice" when she came to France. She then related details of her journey from Domrémy, to Chinon, first applying to Robert de Baudricourt in Vaucouleurs for an escort and leaving that city wearing soldier's attire and equipped with a sword supplied by Baudricourt.

==== Third session: Saturday, February 24, 1431 ====
Again the session began with skirmishing over the oath, after which Jean Beaupere began with extensive questioning concerning Joan's voices. She was asked, among other things, what she was doing when the voice came to her, where the voice was, if there was any tactile interaction, what it said, etc. Joan reported that she asked the voice for counsel regarding the questioning and was told to "answer boldly and God would comfort [her]". She further stated that she "never found [the voice] to utter two contrary opinions" and she affirmed her belief that "this voice comes from God, and by His command".

Several questions of a theological nature followed, including this one:

Question: Do you know whether or not you are in God's grace?

Joan: If I am not, may God put me there; and if I am, may God so keep me. I should be the saddest creature in the world if I knew I were not in His grace.

The question was a deliberate attempt to entrap her, since the Church's doctrine held that no one could be certain of being in God's grace; and yet answering 'no' could also be used against her because the judge could claim she had admitted to being in a state of sin. According to the eyewitnesses, this question elicited a protest from one of the assessors, Jean Lefèvre, who said it was a "grave question" that Joan wasn't required to answer. Cauchon retorted: "It would have been better for you if you had kept your mouth shut!" Joan's response, neatly avoiding the theological trap, left the court "stupefied" according to one of the notaries, Boisguillaume.

She added that if she were in a state of sin, she didn't think these saints would come to her; and she wished everyone could hear them as well as she did. She thought she was about thirteen years old when they came to her for the first time.

From there, the questioning turned again to Joan's childhood in Domremy, with questions about the "Ladies Tree" and the customs surrounding it. The session ended with Joan being asked whether she would wear women's clothing if such were supplied her. She replied: "Give me [a dress] and I will take it and go; otherwise, I am content with this [her male clothes], since it pleases God that I wear it."

==== Fourth session: Tuesday, February 27, 1431 ====
Again Joan took a limited form of the oath and again Beaupere took the principal lead in the questioning, first turning to the subject of her voices. Joan stated that she had heard the voices many times since the previous session and that they were St. Catherine and St. Margaret, whose voices had guided her for seven years, but that the first time she heard voices (when she was about 13), it was that of St. Michael. She said St. Catherine and St. Margaret appeared to her with "beautiful crowns" on their heads. She refused to answer some of the questions, and referred others to the record of the Poitiers investigation.

There was further questioning about her assumption of soldier's attire to which she responded: "Everything I have done is at God's command." As to her first meeting with Charles VII, she referred the most substantive questions to the records of the Poitiers investigation but did state that the "King had a sign touching on my mission before he believed in me" and that "the clergy of my party [i.e., the Armagnac faction] held that there was nothing but good in my mission".

Joan of Arc in prison, by Gillot Saint-Evre (1833)

Questions followed concerning her sword and her standard, which the assessors asked her to describe in particular detail. The session concluded with questioning about the siege at Orleans and the assault against the town of Jargeau. Regarding the former, she stated that "she did indeed" know beforehand that she would be wounded, and that she "had told her king so". She was in fact wounded by an arrow between the neck and left shoulder as she was helping to raise a ladder against the fortress of Les Tourelles.

==== Fifth session: Thursday, March 1, 1431 ====
Following the usual disagreements over the oath, the session then turned to certain letters exchanged between herself and the Count of Armagnac concerning which of the three Papal claimants was the true Pope. Joan stated that she "believed in our Holy Father the Pope at Rome" and that she "had never written nor caused to be written anything concerning the three sovereign Pontiffs".

Other letters which she had dictated were then brought up. In the course of this exchange, she stated that "before seven years are past the English will lose a greater stake than they did at Orléans, for they will lose everything in France" and that she knew this by revelation.

Joan was then asked many detailed questions concerning the saints (called "apparitions" by the questioner, Pierre Cauchon) who she believed visited her. She was asked whether they were male or female, did they have hair, what language they spoke, etc. Asked whether St. Margaret spoke English, she replied: "Why should she speak English when she is not on the English side?"

She was then asked about her rings and whether she attempted to effect cures thereby, to which she replied: "I never cured anyone with any of my rings." They also asked her whether she had a mandrake (a figurine for invoking demons), to which she replied: "I have no mandrake, and never had one."

And finally she was asked again about the sign which was given to her King whereby he recognized her and her mission and again she refused to answer any questions on this subject, saying, "Go and ask him."

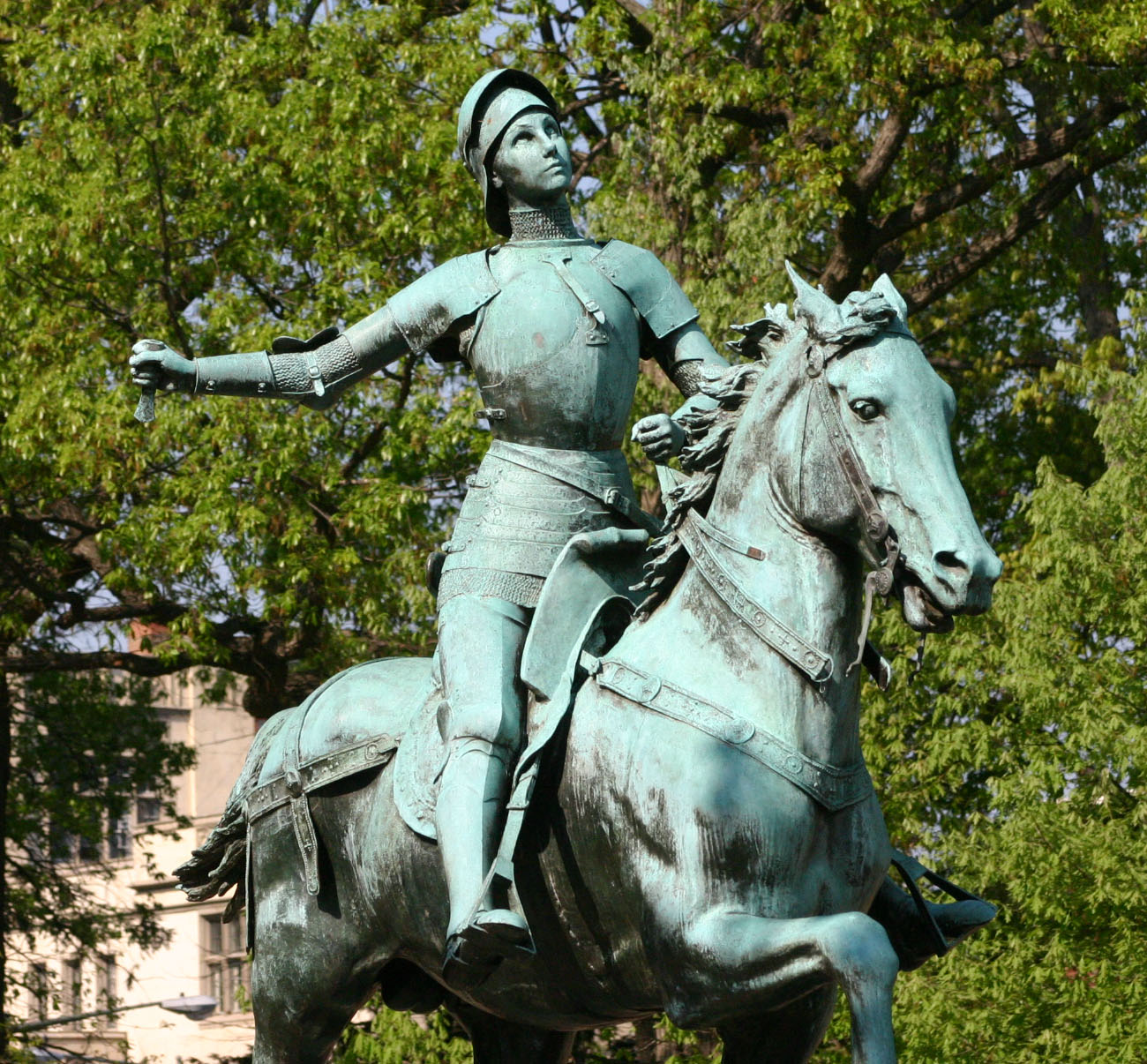
Statue of Joan of Arc on the upper park at Meridian Hill (Malcolm X) Park in Washington, D.C., USA

==== Sixth session: Saturday, March 3, 1431 ====
After taking the oath in the same form as before, the questioning turned once again to the appearance of the Saints whom she claimed to see. She stated: "I saw them with my two eyes, and I believe it was they I saw as firmly as I believe in the existence of God," and that God had created them in the form and fashion that she saw.

Addressing the question of a future escape, she said that the saints in her visions "told me that I shall be delivered, but I do not know the day or the hour."

Turning again to the question of her adoption of soldier's attire, she was asked if she had worn it "by revelation." She referred to the record of Poitiers, but did add that she had begun wearing soldier's clothing at Vaucouleurs, when she set out across enemy-held territory to travel to Chinon. Many other questions about this matter were put to her which she refused to answer. However, it transpired that, on several occasions, she had been offered women's clothing and asked to put off her male attire but she replied that she "would not put it off without God's leave."

Many other questions about her standard and pennons and those of her followers ensued. She replied that they were made of "white satin, and on some there were fleur-de-lis." (Note: The questioner and the assessors seemed to be interested, as evidenced by this line of questioning, in whether or not any magical significance was attached thereto.)

After briefly describing her meeting with Friar Richard at Troyes, the questioning turned to the issue of paintings of Joan ("At Arras, I saw a painting of myself done by the hands of a Scot") and the response of the common people to her—the kissing of her rings, hands, garments, and the like." (Note: Here, the interest seemed to be whether or not she was venerated or worshiped in any way, and whether she encouraged such behavior.) ("Many women touched my hands and my rings; but I do not know with what thought or intention.")

Joan was then asked about her meeting with Catherine de La Rochelle, a French mystic who likewise claimed to have revelations from God. Joan said her saints had described Catherine as "folly and nothing more".

Finally, the session closed with some questions about Joan's escape attempt from the castle at Beaurevoir, where she was held for a number of months by her Burgundian captors. She stated that although her visions forbade it, "from fear of the English, I leaped and commended myself to God" and "in leaping was wounded", further stating that she would "rather surrender her soul to God than fall into the hands of the English".

=== Prison sessions ===
==== Seventh session: Saturday, March 10, 1431 ====
Questioning resumed, this time in her prison cell, with only a handful of assessors present. Joan described the action outside Compiègne when she was taken prisoner by the Burgundians. Asked about the role of her saints in this action, Joan reported that "Easter week last, when I was in the trenches at Melun, I was told by my voices ... that I would be captured before St. John's Day," adding that "it had to be so" and that "I should not be distressed, but take it in good part, and God would aid me." However, although she had known that she would be captured, she did not know the date and time.

She was then asked about her banner and the meaning of the designs painted thereon. Finally, the session closed with questions about the sign she gave to Charles as proof of her mission.

==== Eighth session: Monday, March 12, 1431 (morning) ====
Joan was questioned concerning the first meeting with her King when he was shown a sign. Then attention turned to whether or not her voices/saints had ever failed her in any respect.

Question: Did not the angel fail you ... when you were taken prisoner?

Joan: ... since it pleased God, it was better for me to be taken prisoner.

She further stated that they (her saints) "often come without my calling, but sometimes if they did not come, I would pray God to send them", adding "I have never needed them without having them."

Later, when commenting on when she first heard her voices, Joan said that she "vowed to keep her virginity as long as it should please God" adding that she was then "thirteen years old, or thereabouts". She said that she had not told anyone of her visions (neither her parents, nor her priest, nor any churchman), except Robert de Baudricourt.

Asked whether she thought it was right to leave her parents without permission, she responded that she did so at the command of God and therefore "it was right to do so," further stating that "afterwards, I wrote to them, and they forgave me."

==== Ninth session: Monday, March 12, 1431 (afternoon) ====
Joan was asked concerning a dream which her father had prior to her leaving Domrémy. She replied that she was "often told by my mother that my father spoke of having dreamed that I would go off with men-at-arms" and that she had heard her mother tell how "my father said to my brothers 'in truth, if I thought this thing would happen which I have dreamed about my daughter, I would want you to drown her; and if you would not, I would drown her myself." (He evidently mistakenly assumed she would become a prostitute accompanying an army.)

The questioning then turned again to her adoption of male attire. She answered that the decision to adopt same was "of her own accord, and not at the request of any man alive." She added that "Everything I have done I have done at the instruction of my voices", this latter comment in response to a question as to whether or not her voices ordered her to wear a soldier's outfit.

==== Tenth session: Tuesday, March 13, 1431 ====
The bulk of this session was taken up with a discussion of the "sign" shown to the King (Charles) when Joan first met him at Chinon. When asked whether she had sworn to St. Catherine not to tell the sign, Joan replied, "I have sworn and promised not to tell this sign of my own accord."

Nevertheless, she then went on to describe the sign and the meeting in detail. She described an angel bringing the King a crown of pure gold, rich and precious, which was put in the King's treasury. She added that when she first came to the King accompanied by the angel, she told him, "Sire, this is your sign; take it." When asked why God had chosen her for this task, she replied simply, "It pleased God so to do, by a simple maid to drive back the King's enemies."

The questioning then turned to the assault on Paris. She stated that she went to Paris not at the behest of a revelation, but "at the request of nobles who wanted to make an attack" adding that "after it had been revealed to me ... at Melun that I would be captured, I usually deferred to the captains on questions of war."

==== Eleventh session: Wednesday, March 14, 1431 (morning) ====
The morning session of March 14 began with lengthy questioning concerning Joan's leap from the tower at Beaurevoir where she had been held captive prior to being delivered to the English. She gave as one of the reasons for the leap that she knew she "had been sold to the English, and I would have died rather than fall into the hands of my enemies the English."

Asked directly whether, in leaping from the tower, she expected to kill herself, Joan replied, "No, for as I leaped I commended myself to God." By leaping she hoped to escape and avoid deliverance to the English.

The questioning then turned to her Saints and the light which accompanied them when they spoke to her. She stated that there was not a day when they did not come, and that they were always accompanied by a light. She asked three things of her voices: her deliverance (from imprisonment by the English), that God should aid the French, and, finally, she asked for the salvation of her soul.

The prisoner was asked about a warning which she had given to Bishop Cauchon. She reported her words as follows:

Joan: (to Cauchon) "You say that you are my judge; I do not know if you are: but take good heed not to judge me ill, because you would put yourself in great peril. And I warn you so that if God punish you for it, I shall have done my duty in telling you."

Asked what this meant, she reported that St. Catherine had told her she would have aid, that she would be delivered by a great victory, adding, "Take everything peacefully; have no care for thy martyrdom; in the end thou shalt come to the Kingdom of Paradise."

The questioning ended for this session with Joan being asked whether, after hearing that revelation, she felt she could no longer commit mortal sin. She replied, "I do not know; but in everything I commit myself to God."

==== Twelfth session: Wednesday, March 14, 1431 (afternoon) ====
In the afternoon of the same day, the assessors convened again in Joan's prison cell, taking up where the morning session had left off, namely, with the question of Joan's salvation and the certainty she felt concerning same. Joan qualified her earlier reply by adding that her belief in her salvation was "provided that I kept my oath and promise to Our Lord to keep safe my virginity of body and of soul."

Asked about any need she felt to confess, she responded that she "did not know of having committed mortal sin," adding that "if I were in mortal sin, I think St. Catherine and St. Margaret would at once abandon me."

After a question was raised concerning allegations that Joan had taken a man at ransom and subsequently had him put to death, she answered that she had not done that. Then the assessors read off a list of charges, all of which had been dealt with in previous examinations, and asked her, in reference thereto, whether or not she felt herself in mortal sin as a result. She replied:

Joan: I do not think I am in mortal sin, and if I am, it is for God, and the priest in confession, to know it.

Apart from this, her replies to the charges (concerning the attack on Paris on a Feast Day, the allegation that she had stolen a horse from the Bishop of Senlis, her leap from the tower of Beaurevoir, her wearing of male clothing, and the aforesaid charge concerning a prisoner who was put to death) were a recapitulation of earlier replies. Regarding the horse, her statement was that she had purchased the horse from the Bishop, but that she did not know if he received the money.

==== Thirteenth session: Thursday, March 15, 1431 ====
Throughout the trial, Joan had been requesting to hear Mass which had been refused to her. She was asked whether or not it would be proper for her to attend church wearing men's clothing or women's clothing.

Joan: Promise me that I'll get to hear Mass if I wear woman's clothing.
Interrogator: I promise that you will hear Mass if you wear women's clothing.
Joan: And what do you say if I've promised our king and sworn not to remove these clothes? Nonetheless, I say, make me a long robe that touches the ground, with no train and give it to me for Mass. Then when I come back I'll put back on these clothes I'm wearing.

Throughout the rest of this section Joan told the inquisitors that she was confident in what she had said to them. She said, ″All my words and deeds are in God's hands, and I wait on him in these things. I assure you, I would not do or say anything against the Christian faith. If I had said or done anything, or if there were anything on my body that clerks could say was against the Christian faith the Lord established, I would not uphold it but would reject it.″

==== Fourteenth session: Saturday, March 17, 1431 (morning) ====
In nearly the last session, Joan answered questions about her Saintly voices as well as wearing men's clothes. In response to the question of whether she thought her Saints hated the English, Joan replied, ″They love what God loves and hate what God hates.″ Upon being asked whether God hated the English, Joan responded that she did not know, but believed that the English would be beaten as punishment for their sins. This session focused on Joan's military career as well as if she herself was worshipped. She refused to answer some of the questions posed by her inquisitors about her banner and sword, but explained to them that she had already answered these questions, something that she repeatedly did throughout the entirety of her trial.

==== Fifteenth session: Saturday, March 17, 1431 (afternoon) ====
In the final session of her trial, Joan was questioned about her banner. The inquisitors implied that the banner was the reason that she had been victorious in battle, but Joan gave all credit to God. Joan had told her inquisitors that Saints Margaret and Catherine gave her the banner though it was provided by God. She explained that all the symbolism and the wording was in respect to God. Joan was asked whether she had been in contact with any fairies, why she looked at her ring before battle, and why the banner was present at the Dauphin's coronation. This was where accusations of Joan being a witch were more focused.

== Ordinary trial ==
The ordinary, or regular, trial of Joan began on March 26, the day after Palm Sunday, with the drawing up of the 70 articles, later summarized in a 12 article indictment. If Joan refused to answer them, she would have been said to have admitted them. On the following day, the articles were read aloud and Joan was questioned in French. The next two days, the extensive list of charges were then read to her in French. The Ordinary Trial concluded on May 24 with the abjuration.

== Abjuration ==
On May 24, Joan was taken to a scaffold set up in the cemetery next to Saint-Ouen Church, and told that she would be burned immediately unless she signed a document renouncing her visions and agreeing to stop wearing soldiers' clothing. Faced with immediate execution, she agreed to give up the clothing and sign the abjuration document.

== Execution ==
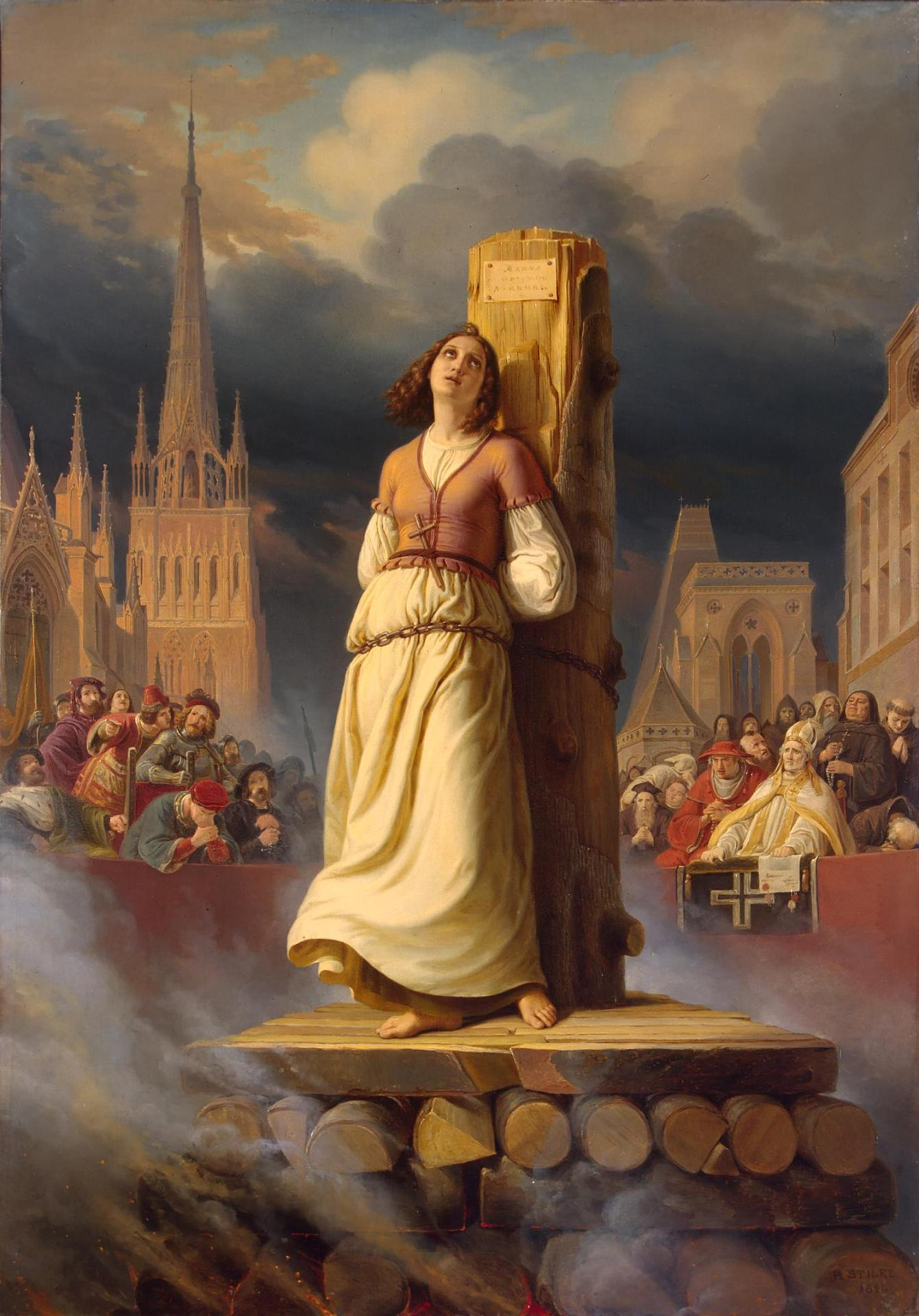
Joan of Arc being burnt at the stake in Rouen, by Hermann Stilke

On May 28, Joan recanted her previous abjuration, and donned men's apparel once more. When asked, she admitted to listening to her voices again. She was accused of relapsing into heresy, and sentenced to be executed. "Only those who had relapsed—that is, those who having once abjured their errors returned to them—could be condemned to death by a tribunal of the Inquisition and delivered for death."

On May 30, Joan was burned at the stake at the Old Marketplace in Rouen.

== Aftermath ==
Eighteen years after Joan of Arc’s execution, an ecclesiastical tribunal initiated a retrial at the request of Charles VII. The tribunal declared that the judgement of the original trial was not valid because it was biased and had not followed proper procedure.

On May 16, 1920, Pope Benedict XV canonized Joan of Arc as a Saint. She is the patroness saint of France, women, prisoners, and soldiers.

== Sources ==
- DuParc, Pierre [in French] (1977). Procès en Nullité de la Condamnation de Jeanne d'Arc. Vol. 1. Société de l'Histoire de France.
- Quicherat, Jules (1844). Procès de Condamnation et de Réhabilitation de Jeanne d'Arc. Vol. 2. Société de l'Histoire de France.
- Transcription of the Condemnation documents, in Procès de condamnation et de réhabilitation de Jeanne d'Arc volume I, by Jules Quicherat (transcriber and editor).
- Philippe-Hector Dunand's Histoire complète de Jeanne d’Arc in three volumes (1898–1899).
- "The Trial of Condemnation", in Joan of Arc, By Herself and Her Witnesses by Régine Pernoud, translated by Edward Hyams. Includes lengthy excerpts from the transcript and descriptions by the eyewitnesses.
