= Jeannette: The Childhood of Joan of Arc =

2017 film

- Film poster
- French: Jeannette, l’enfance de Jeanne d’Arc
- Directed by: Bruno Dumont
- Written by: Bruno Dumont
- Based on: Jeanne d’Arc by Charles Péguy; Le Mystère de la charité de Jeanne d’Arc by Charles Péguy
- Produced by: Jean Bréhat; Rachid Bouchareb; Muriel Merlin
- Starring: Lise Leplat Prudhomme; Jeanne Voisin; Lucile Gauthier; Victoria Lefebvre; Aline Charles; Elise Charles; Nicolas Leclaire; Anaïs Rivière; Gery De Poorter; Regine Delalin
- Cinematography: Guillaume Deffontaines
- Edited by: Bruno Dumont; Basile Belkhiri
- Music by: Igorrr
- Distributed by: Memento Distribution
- Release dates: 21 May 2017 (Cannes); 6 September 2017 (France)
- Running time: 115 minutes
- Country: France
- Language: French

Jeannette: The Childhood of Joan of Arc (French: Jeannette, l’enfance de Jeanne d’Arc) is a 2017 French musical film directed by Bruno Dumont. It was screened in the Directors' Fortnight section at the 2017 Cannes Film Festival. It was followed two years later by the non-musical sequel Joan of Arc, which premiered at the 2019 Cannes Film Festival, written and directed by Dumont and with Lise Leplat Prudhomme reprising her role. The script is an adaptation of the play The Mystery of the Charity of Joan of Arc, written in 1910 by the Catholic author Charles Péguy.

== Plot ==
Set in France during the Hundred Years' War, the film portrays Joan of Arc's religious awakening as a child and her decision to fight against the English invasion as she grows up.

A young Joan of Arc, going by the name Jeannette, is tending her flock of sheep when she encounters children orphaned from the Hundred Years' War and lacking food. After sharing her own food with them, she laments the condition of the country and seeming lack of help from God to her friend Hauviette, and asks her to fetch a nun to ask why God allows this suffering. The nun, Madam Gervaise (played by two actors in the same scene), preaches faith to her, and giving prayer another chance, she asks God to save Saint Michael and his men; immediately afterwards Hauviette arrives with the news that they were saved. Walking through the forest shortly later, Jeannette has a vision of three saints, who command her to become the warlord which France needs to defeat the English.

A few years later, Jeannette, now going by Jean, determines at last to leave and lead the French soldiers. She relates her vision to her uncle, convincing him to help her reach the front lines and to lie to her father and mother in order to get away. However, when the time comes, she is unable to bring herself to leave.

Months later, now fully resolved and using the excuse of tending to a sick relative, she departs with her uncle for the front lines.

== Cast ==
- Lise Leplat Prudhomme as Jeannette
  - Jeanne Voisin as Jeannette (older)
- Lucile Gauthier as Hauviette (age 8)
  - Victoria Lefebvre as Hauviette (age 13)
- Aline Charles as Madame Gervaise/Sainte Marguerite
- Elise Charles as Madame Gervaise/Sainte Catherine
- Nicolas Leclaire as Durand Lassois
- Anaïs Rivière as Saint Michel
- Gery De Poorter as Jacques d'Arc
- Regine Delalin as Isabeau d’Arc

== Release ==
The film had its world premiere in the Directors' Fortnight section at the 2017 Cannes Film Festival. It was released in France on 6 September 2017.

== Reception ==
=== Critical reception ===
Review aggregator website Rotten Tomatoes gives the film a score of 74% based on 34 reviews, with an average rating of 6.6/10. The website's critical consensus reads, "Its unusual approach may not pay off quite as consistently as one might hope, but the boldly anachronistic Jeannette: The Childhood of Joan of Arc is definitely a biopic like no other." On Metacritic, the film has a weighted average score of 62 out of 100, based on 14 critics, indicating "generally favorable reviews."

In the Boston Globe, Ty Burr described the film as "very likely the first medieval heavy-metal musical ever to grace the silver screen" and "deeply and unsettlingly strange," providing "genuine oddball pleasures amid stretches of real tedium." Simon Abrams of RogerEbert.com gave the film 3½ out of 4 stars, calling it "a challenging arthouse drama that has a slippery sense of humor and a whole lot of chutzpah." Sam C. Mac of Slant Magazine said, "As an exploration of Joan of Arc in cinema narrative, the film isn't as rich and substantial as Bresson's The Trial of Joan of Arc or Dreyer's The Passion of Joan of Arc, but Dumont's more flexible sense of spiritualism makes it nonetheless compelling."

Conversely, Jordan Mintzer of The Hollywood Reporter said, "The acting outside the singing is often on the level of a class play, and the repetition of musical numbers and kitschy dances can grow tiresome to say the least, but you have to give Dumont credit for making something so silly seem so filled with conviction." Peter Debruge of Variety called it "a blasphemous assault on French history, religion, and the musical genre."

Meanwhile, John Waters placed the film at the top of his best-of list for 2017, writing: "An insanely radical heavy-metal grade-school religious pageant that is sung in French from beginning to end. The actors themselves seem like they might burst out laughing, but this is no joke. It's the best movie of the year. You'll hate it."

In the New York Times, Glenn Kenny writes, " 'Jeannette' throws the modern back at the medieval, making no distinction between religious ecstasy and that experienced in certain contemporary contexts of music and ritual. It's a provocative proposition that yields a film of genuine spiritual dimension."

Cahiers du cinéma placed the film at number 2 on its list of the top 10 films of 2017.

=== Accolades ===
Award	Year of ceremony	Category	Recipient(s)	Result	Ref(s)
Louis Delluc Prize	2017	Best Film	Jeannette: The Childhood of Joan of Arc	Nominated	
Lumière Awards	2018	Best Music	Igorrr	Nominated	

== See also ==
- Joan of Arc
- Cultural depictions of Joan of Arc
