= Isabelle Romée =

Mother of Joan of Arc

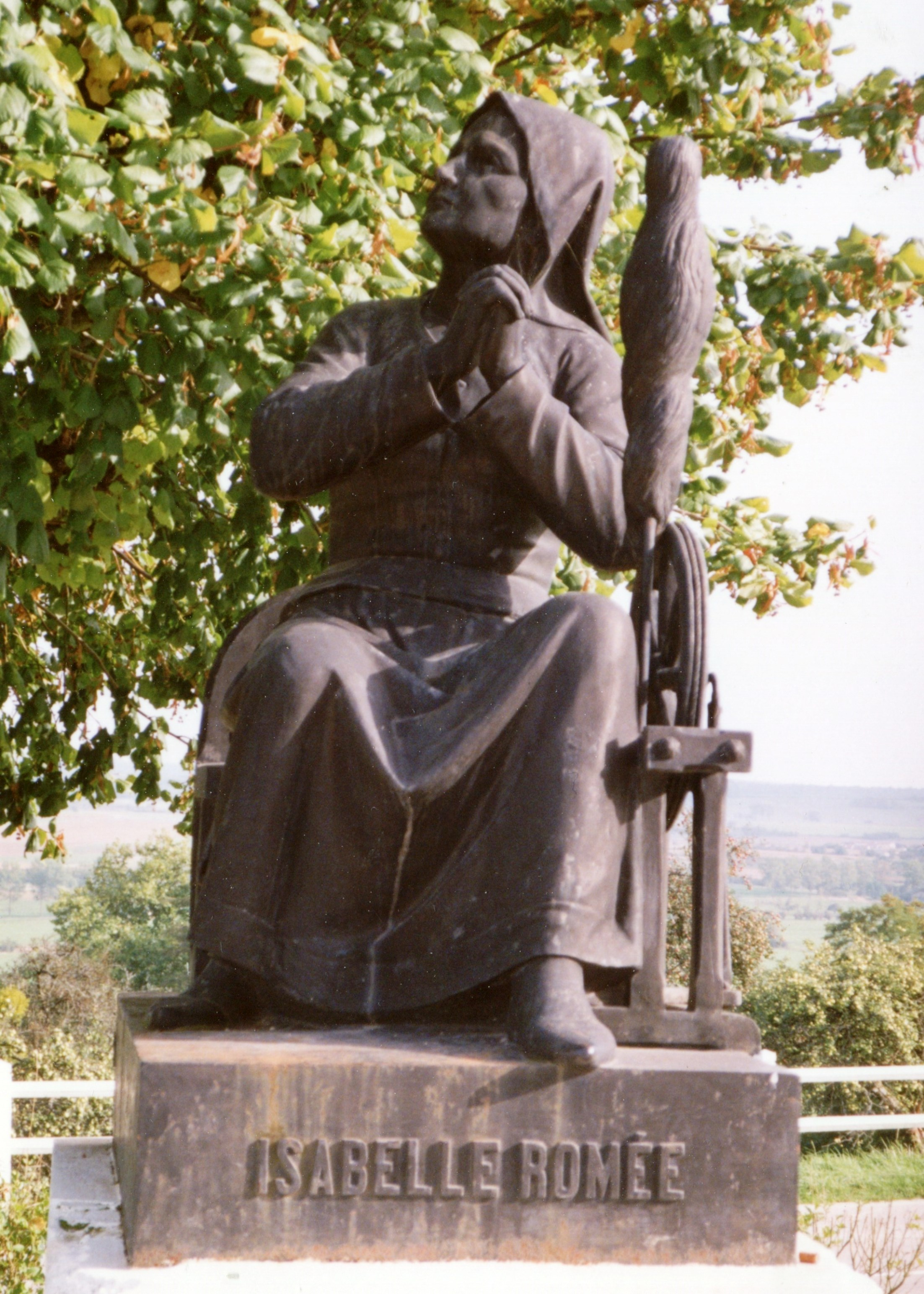
- Statue of Isabelle Romée at Domrémy
- Born: Isabelle Romée; 1377
- Died: 1458 (aged 80–81)
- Spouse: Jacques d'Arc
- Children: 5, including Jeanne d'Arc and Pierre d'Arc

Isabelle Romée, also known as Isabelle de Vouthon and Isabelle d'Arc (1377–1458) and Ysabeau Romee, was the mother of Joan of Arc. She grew up in Vouthon-Bas and later married Jacques d'Arc. The couple moved to Domrémy, where they owned a farm consisting of about 50 acres (200,000 m^{2}) of land. After their daughter's famous exploits in 1429, the family was granted noble status by Charles VII in December of that year. Isabelle moved to Orléans in 1440 after her husband's death and received a pension from the city. She petitioned Pope Nicholas V to reopen the court case that had convicted Joan of heresy, and then, in her seventies, addressed the opening session of the appellate trial at Notre Dame cathedral in Paris. The appeals court overturned Joan's conviction on 7 July 1456. Isabelle died two years later, probably at Sandillon near Orléans.

== Biography ==
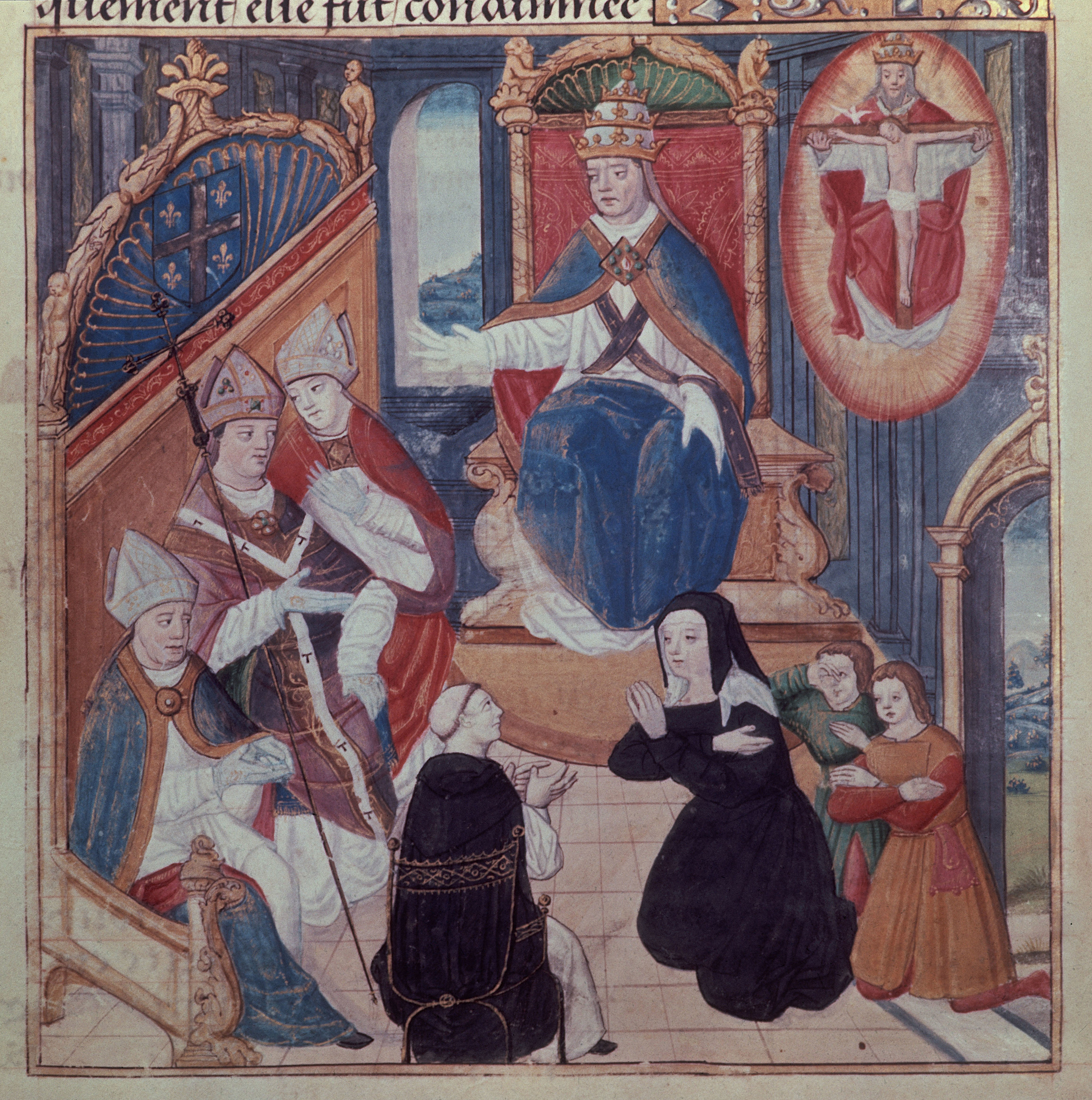
Isabelle Romée (kneeling and dressed in black) and her two sons in front of the great inquisitor of France, Jean Bréhal (back, foreground, with Dominican clothes). Inspired by the Trinity (represented in the upper right corner), Pope Callixtus III (seated on the papal throne) authorizes the nullity of the conviction of Joan of Arc. Miniature of the Manuscript of Diane de Poitiers. 16th Century. Private collection.

Isabelle Romée was a native of Vouthon-Bas, a village near Domrémy where she and her husband Jacques d'Arc settled. Together they owned about 50 acres (200,000 m^{2}) of land and a modest house. Isabelle Romée may have earned her surname from a pilgrimage to Rome. Surnames were not universal in the early 15th century and a woman could be known by a different one from her husband.

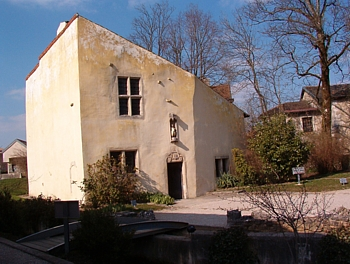
The house where Isabelle Romée raised Joan of Arc, which is now a museum. The village church is at the right behind several trees.

Isabelle Romée gave her daughter a religious, Catholic upbringing and taught her the craft of spinning wool. She also had three sons, Jacquemin, Jean, and Pierre, and a daughter named Catherine, though little is known about her life. Like the rest of the immediate family, she was ennobled by royal grant on 29 December 1429. She moved to Orléans in 1440 after her husband's death and received a pension from the city.

Isabelle Romée spent the rest of her life restoring her daughter's name. She petitioned Pope Nicholas V to reopen the court case that had convicted Joan of heresy. An inquiry finally opened in 1449. The chief inquisitor of France, Jean Bréhal, took up the case and conducted an initial investigation in May 1452. On 7 November 1455, after the reign of Pope Callixtus III had begun, Isabelle traveled to Paris to visit the delegation from the Holy See. Although she was over seventy years old, she addressed the assembly with a moving speech. It began, "I had a daughter, born in legitimate marriage, whom I fortified worthily with the sacraments of baptism and confirmation and raised in the fear of God and respect for the tradition of the Church," and ended, "…without any aid given to her innocence in a perfidious, violent, and iniquitous trial, without a shadow of right… they condemned her in a damnable and criminal fashion and made her die most cruelly by fire." Isabelle attended most of the appellate trial sessions despite poor health. The appeals court overturned the conviction on 7 July 1456.

Isabelle died on 28 November 1458, likely in the village of Sandillon near Orleans.

== Portrayals ==
- Jeanne D'Alcy in the 1900 film Joan of Arc starring Jeanne Calvière.
- Selena Royle in the 1948 film Joan of Arc starring Ingrid Bergman.
- Tatiana Moukhine in the 1994 film Joan the Maiden starring Sandrine Bonnaire.
- Jacqueline Bisset in the 1999 television miniseries Joan of Arc starring Leelee Sobieski.
- Regine Delalin in the 2017 musical film Jeannette: The Childhood of Joan of Arc starring Lise Leplat Prudhomme.
- Glenn Close in the 2018 theater play The Mother of the Maid at the Public Theater in New York City

== See also ==
- Joan of Arc bibliography

== Notes ==
1. As inscribed on a memorial plaque in Notre-Dame Cathedral dated 22 April 1894.
2. Pernoud, Régine; Clin, Marie-Véronique (October 1999). Joan of Arc: Her Story. New York: Palgrave Macmillan. p. 221. ISBN 9780312227302..
3. Pernoud, Régine; Clin, Marie-Véronique (October 1999). Joan of Arc: Her Story. New York: Palgrave Macmillan. p. 147. ISBN 9780312227302..
4. Pernoud, Régine; Clin, Marie-Véronique (October 1999). Joan of Arc: Her Story. New York: Palgrave Macmillan. pp. 156–157. ISBN 9780312227302..
5. Pernoud, Régine; Clin, Marie-Véronique (October 1999). Joan of Arc: Her Story. New York: Palgrave Macmillan. p. 158. ISBN 9780312227302..
6. Pernoud, Régine; Clin, Marie-Véronique (October 1999). Joan of Arc: Her Story. New York: Palgrave Macmillan. p. 158. ISBN 9780312227302.
