= Name of Joan of Arc =

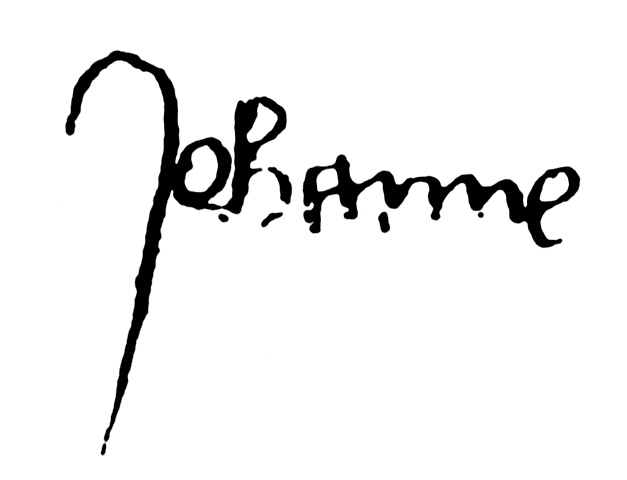
Replica of a signature of Joan of Arc made on 28 March 1430, showing "Jehanne" (medieval spelling for "Jeanne"). Joan of Arc dictated her letters. Three of the surviving ones are signed.

Another replica of a signature made on 16 March 1430

Due to inconsistent record keeping and different contemporary customs, the name of Joan of Arc at birth is not known for certain.

== Explanation ==
Joan of Arc did not hail from a place called Arc, contrary to popular belief, but was born and raised in the village of Domrémy in what was then the northeastern frontier of the Kingdom of France. In the English language her first name has been repeated as Joan since the fifteenth century because that was the only English equivalent for the feminine form of John during her lifetime. Her surviving signatures are all spelled in the middle French form Jehanne without surname. In modern French, her name is always rendered as Jeanne d'Arc, reflecting spelling changes due to the evolution of the language over time. Her given name at birth is also sometimes written as "Jeanneton" or "Jeannette", with Joan of Arc possibly having removed the diminutive suffix -eton or -ette in her teenage years.

The surname of Arc is a translation of d'Arc, which itself is a nineteenth-century French approximation of her father's name. Apostrophes were never used in fifteenth-century French surnames, which sometimes leads to confusion between place names and other names that begin with the letter D. Based on Latin records, which do reflect a difference, her father's name was more likely Darc. Spelling was also phonetic and original records produce his surname in at least nine different forms, such as Dars, Day, Darx, Dare, Tarc, Tart or Dart.

To further complicate matters, surnames were not universal in the fifteenth century and surname inheritance did not necessarily follow modern patterns. Joan of Arc testified at her trial that she didn't know anything about her surname. No surviving record from Joan's lifetime shows that she used either her mother's or her father's surname, but she often referred to herself as la Pucelle, which roughly translates as the Maiden. Prior to the mid-nineteenth century, when Jeanne d'Arc and Joan of Arc became standard, literature and artistic works that refer to her often describe her as la Pucelle or the Maid of Orléans. Her native village has been renamed Domrémy-la-Pucelle in reflection of that tradition.

Joan appears, in a negative light, in William Shakespeare's late sixteenth-century play Henry VI, Part 1. In the play she is referred to mainly as Joan La Pucelle and Joan, but also twice as Joan of Arc.

== De Quincey on the name (1847) ==
Now, the worshipful reason of modern France for disturbing the old received spelling, is–that Jean Hordal, a descendant of La Pucelle's brother, spelled the name Darc, in 1612. But what of that? Beside the chances that M. Hordal might be a gigantic blockhead, it is notorious that what small matter of spelling Providence had thought fit to disburse amongst man in the seventeenth century, was all monopolized by printers: in France, much more so.

—Thomas De Quincey, Joan of Arc

== In Latin ==
In the bull of her canonization, Divina Disponente of 16 May 1920, Pope Benedict XV consistently gave her name in Latin as "Ioanna de Arc", "Ioanna" being the feminine nominative singular form of Ioannes. Although it has been given elsewhere as "Ioanna Arcensis", "Arcensis" being in the nominative case and denoting "of Arc", Roman Catholic saints denominated toponymically in Latin generally are denominated "de" (which takes the ablative case) followed by the toponym, though, in post-classical Latin usage, "de" was used patronymically on occasion as well. In any case, in translating foreign names that did not have commonly recognized Latin equivalents, the oblique forms of the native names were also used on occasion. Due to the ambiguous meaning of the surname, the Latin "de Arc" is likely not a true toponym, but rather the Latinization of "d'Arc", despite the absence of apostrophes in French surnames during the life of St. Joan.

== See also ==
- Cultural depictions of Joan of Arc
- Joan of Arc bibliography
