= Pierronne =

Pierronne, also known as Pierrone, Pierronne la Bretonne and Perrinaïc (died 3 September 1430), was a Breton woman who said she saw visions of "God dressed in a long white robe with a red tunic underneath". Pierronne, who may have met Joan of Arc in 1429, tried to defend her reputation at Corbeil. For this, Pierronne was arrested by pro-English authorities in March 1430 and burned at the stake.

== Origins ==
Pierronne was said to have come from western Brittany ("Bretagne bretonnante"), but her exact date and place of birth are unknown. The variant name "Perrinaïc" is an attempt to render the French name Pierronne/Perrine into Breton with the affectionate suffix -ic.

== Adult life ==
Very little is known about Pierronne's life aside from brief descriptions in several 15th-century sources. She was described as a companion of a Franciscan friar named Brother Richard, who was known for his association with several mystics and visionaries including Joan of Arc, and was a favorite preacher of Charles VII's queen, Marie d'Anjou. Brother Richard had first met Joan of Arc at the city of Troyes in early July 1429, but the 15th-century sources make no mention of Pierronne's presence at that time. Anatole France thought that Pierronne "had followed [Joan] on her departure from Sully," but the only certainty is that she was with Joan during Christmas of 1429, since the later accusations against her mentions both Pierronne and Joan receiving the Eucharist (Communion) from Brother Richard at that time.

== Arrest and execution ==
Pierronne was part of a group of women who tried to defend Joan of Arc's reputation by publicly stating that Joan "was good, and that what she did was well done and according to God's will." Pro-English authorities arrested Pierronne and the other women at Corbeil in March 1430. She was taken to English-occupied Paris and put on trial by clergy from the city's university. Threatened with summary execution unless she recanted, she was burned at the stake on 3 September 1430.

The stated reason given for Pierronne's execution was her assertion that God appeared to her "dressed in a long white robe with a scarlet tunic" and "she was never willing to revoke her affirmation that she often saw God dressed in this manner, for which reason she was judged to be burned on that day."

Since this is a rather curious accusation, modern historians have speculated that the actual reason for her conviction must have been her statements supporting Joan of Arc. Pierre Lanéry d'Arc - a descendant of Joan's brother Pierre who wrote extensively on her - noted: "Perrinaïc had affirmed on a number of occasions Joan's virtues and divine mission: and the English, out of anger, condemned her to die and burned her alive."

== Modern literature ==
Although there is little literature about Pierronne/Perrinaïc, one of the most influential modern works was a novel written in 1891, Perrinaïc, une compagne de Jeanne d'Arc, by the poet Narcisse Quellien. The historian Henri Daniel-Lacombe commented that Quellien invented almost every detail from his own imagination:

"History shows us Pierronne meeting with Joan on only a single day. The poet Quellien places Perrinaïc in Joan's company every day or very nearly so, following her right into battle and, 'after the carnage had ended, weeping with her over the dead,' although once again history attributes not a single war-related deed to Pierronne".
