= Vouthon-Bas =

- Commune
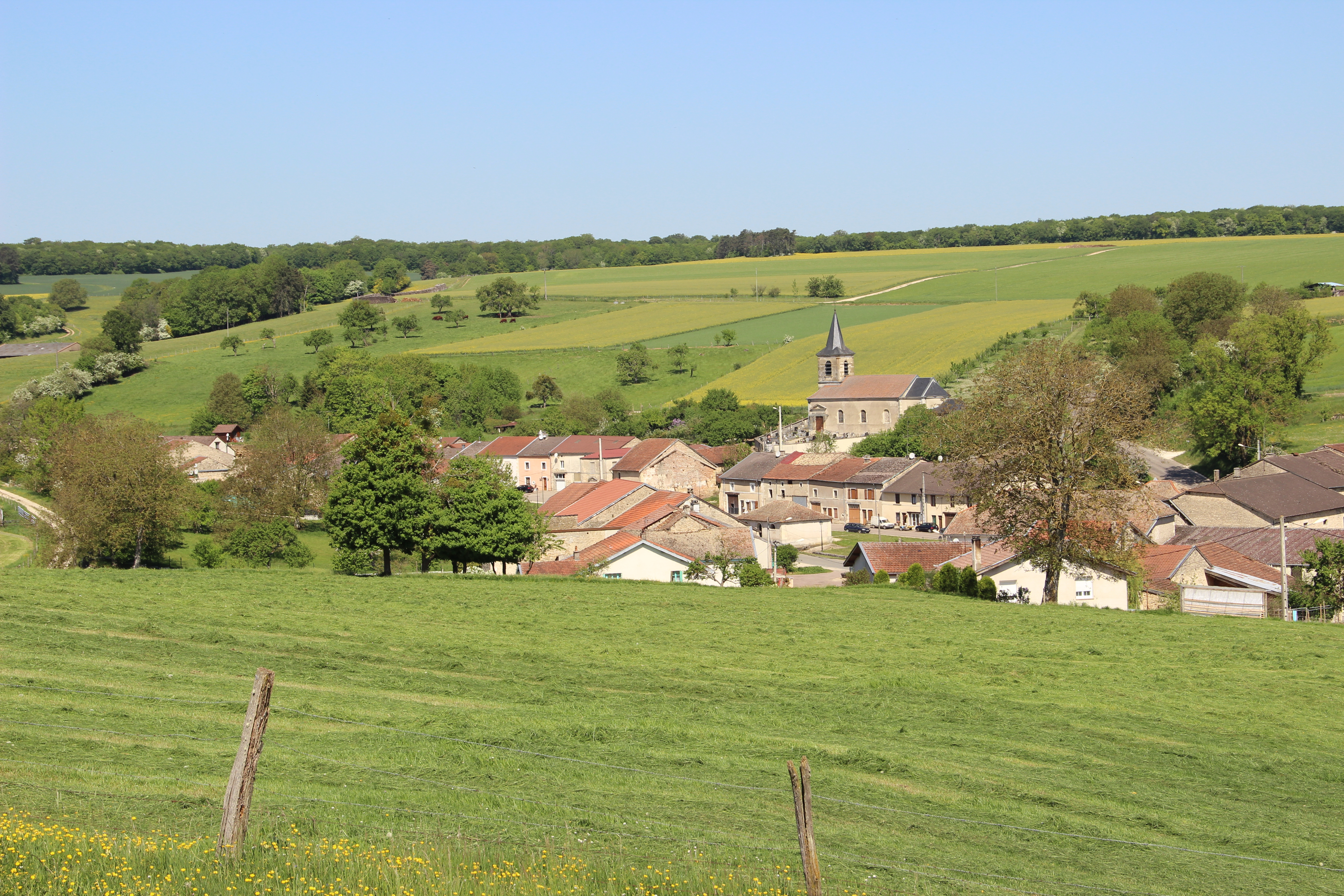
- A general view of Vouthon-Bas

- Coat of arms
- Location of Vouthon-Bas
- Location within France Location within Grand Est
- Coordinates: 48°29′03″N 5°36′33″E
- Country: France
- Region: Grand Est
- Department: Meuse
- Arrondissement: Commercy
- Canton: Ligny-en-Barrois
- Intercommunality: Portes de Meuse

Government
  - Mayor (2020–2026): Patrick Poisson
- Area^{1}: 7.22 km^{2} (2.79 sq mi)
- Elevation: 325 m (1,066 ft)
- Highest elevation: 427 m (1,401 ft)
- Lowest elevation: 305 m (1,001 ft)
- Population (2023): 42
  - Density: 5.8/km^{2} (15/sq mi)
- Time zone: UTC+01:00 (CET)
  - Summer (DST): UTC+02:00 (CEST)
- INSEE/Postal code: 55574 /55130
- ^{1} French Land Register data, which excludes lakes, ponds, glaciers > 1 km^{2} (0.386 sq mi or 247 acres) and river estuaries.

Vouthon-Bas (French pronunciation: [vutɔ̃ ba]) is a commune in the Meuse department in Grand Est in north-eastern France. A notable native is Isabelle Romée, the mother of Joan of Arc.

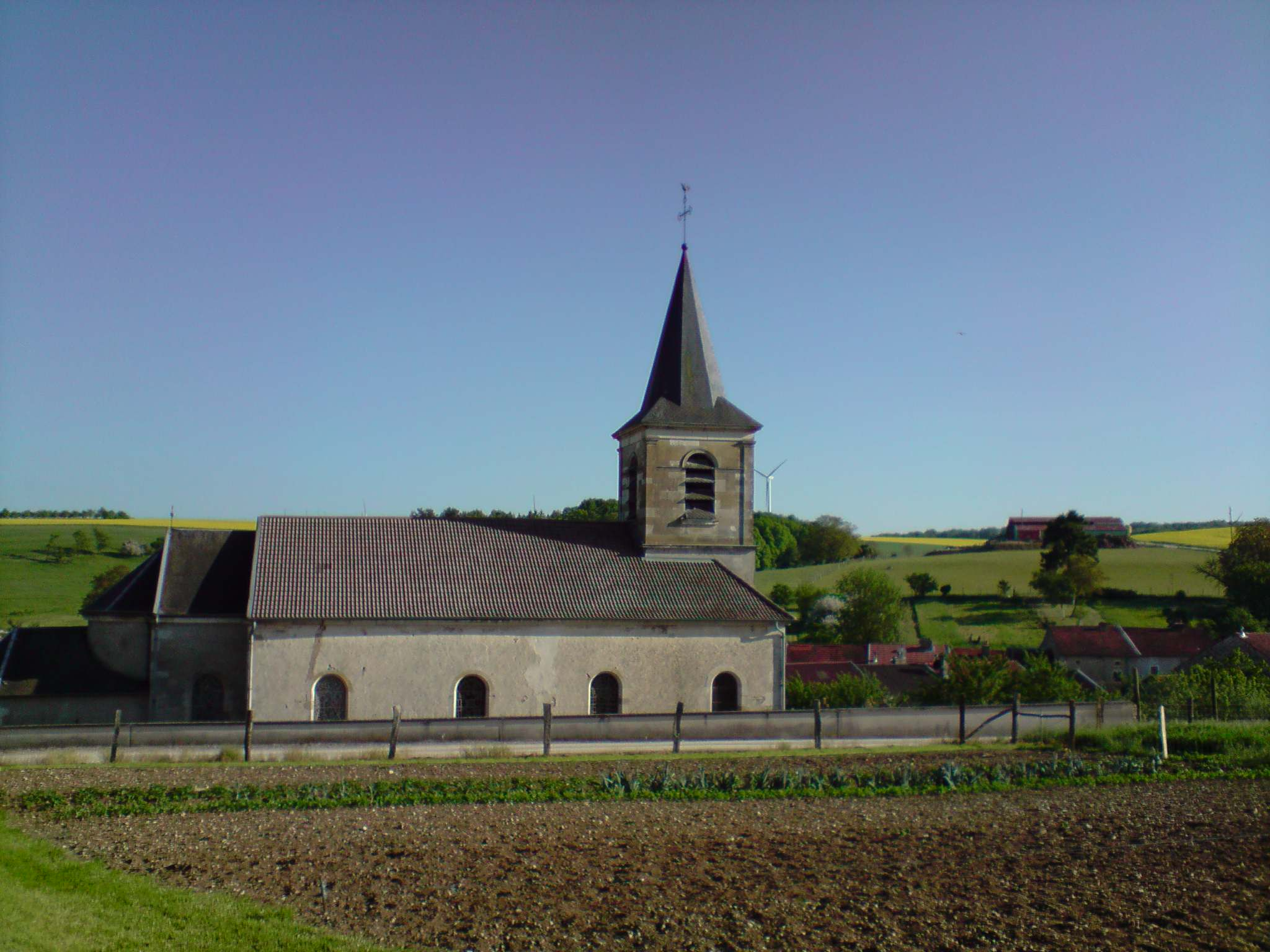

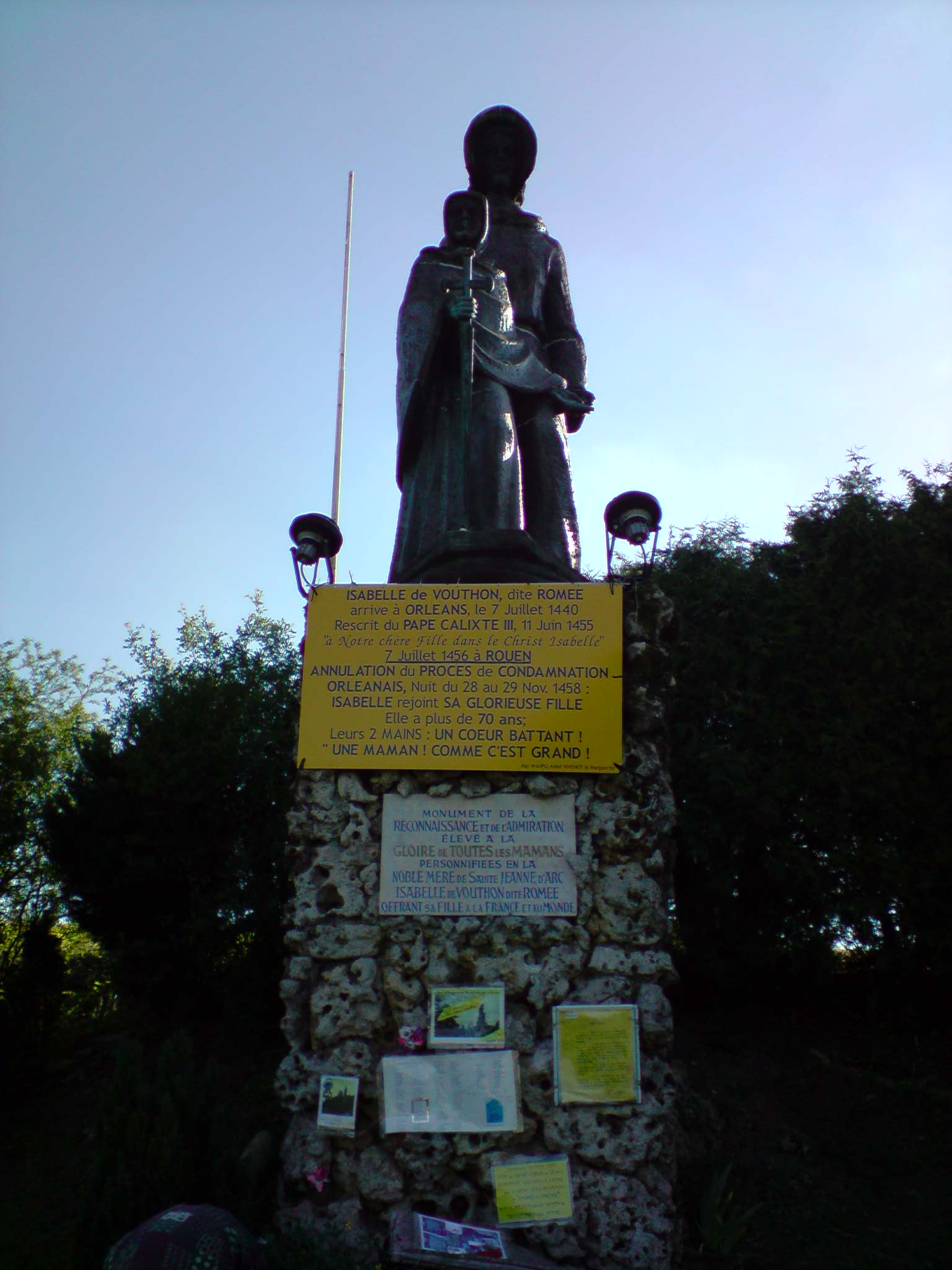

== See also ==
- Communes of the Meuse department
