= Château de Jaulny =

Castle in Meurthe-et-Moselle, France

Coordinates: 48°58′10″N 5°53′11″E

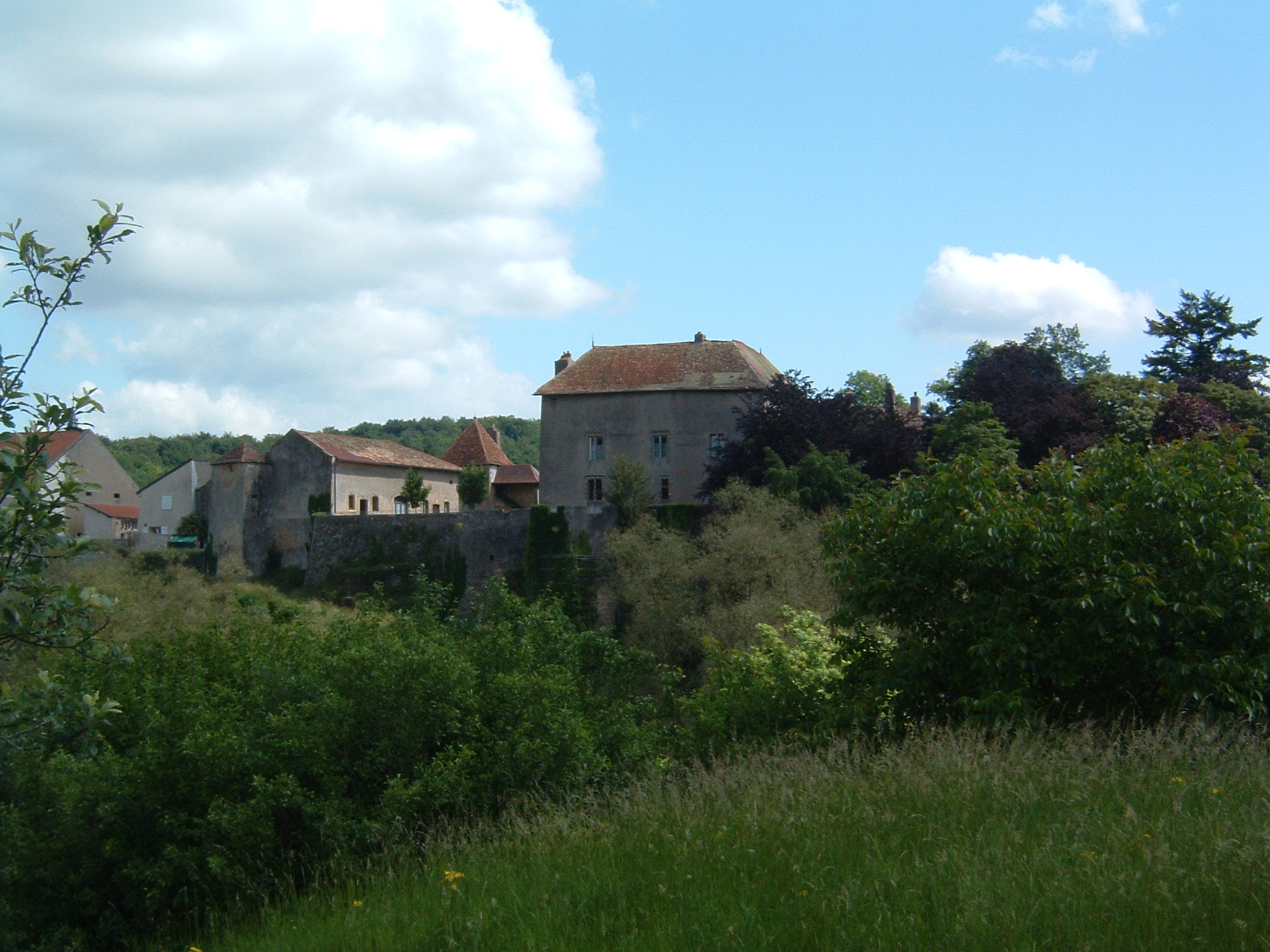
Château de Jaulny

The Château de Jaulny is a castle in the commune of Jaulny in the Meurthe-et-Moselle département of France. It has been listed since 1966 as a monument historique by the French Ministry of Culture.

Military occupation of the site has been known since the 12th century. The fortified U-shaped house dates from the end of 15th or the beginning of the 16th century. An enclosing wall was built in second half of the 17th century. The site was transformed during the 18th century with a home built against the southern wall. Below the western wing are arched cellars dating from the 16th century. In spite of the successive alterations, the castle preserves the composition of the 16th century.

== Joan of Arc? ==
Local tradition since the Middle Ages has it that Joan of Arc, contrary to accepted wisdom, was not from Arc but that she was married to Robert des Armoises. Legend also has it that, far from being burned and her ashes being thrown into the Seine, she is actually buried in Pulligny sur Madon. In 1871, two portraits were discovered when plaster was removed from a 15th-century chimney. The village mayor confirmed that his great great grandfather had covered the portraits on the orders of Monsieur des Armoises before the French Revolution and that they were of Joan and her husband, Robert des Armoises. Several books have been published on this theory.

== The castle today ==
The Château de Jaulny is privately owned and operated as a guest house with restaurant.

== See also ==
- List of castles in France
- Claude des Armoises

== References and sources ==
- Nora Wooster, The Real Joan of Arc, Book Guild
- Marcel Gay, L'Affaire Jeanne d'Arc, Editions Florent Massot
