= Jeanne des Armoises =

French adventuress

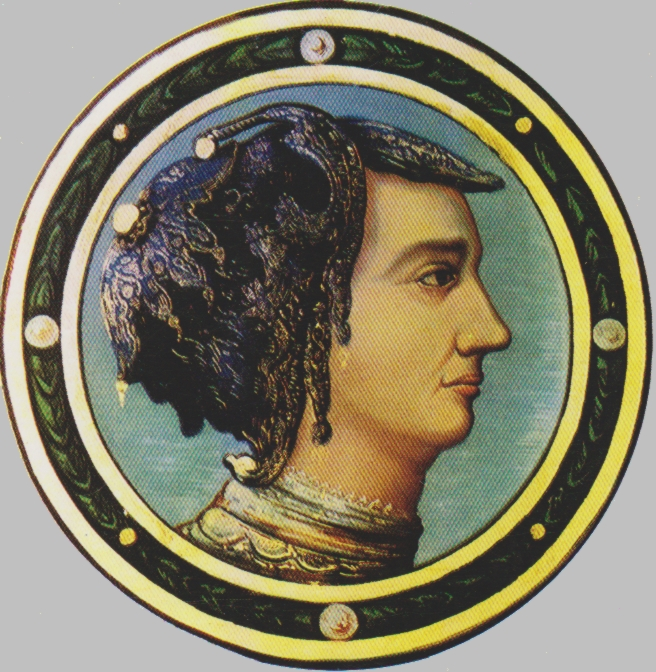
19th-century depiction

Jeanne des Armoises (also Claude des Armoises; fl. 1438) was a French adventurer living in the 15th century. She was reportedly a soldier in the Pope's army in Italy.

Following Joan of Arc's execution, several young women came forward claiming to be her, including Claude des Armoises. In the autumn of 1436, Joan of Arc's brothers Pierre and Jean temporarily accepted Jeanne des Armoises as the actual Joan. She was armed, dressed like a man, drank deep, danced with men, and called herself Jeanne la Pucelle. She even performed minor acts of magic (breaking glasses and tearing napkins and making them whole) and fought battles, slaying two men according to her. The whole town of Orléans entertained her as the real Maid. Over the next three years, the brothers and their "sister" traveled from town to town, beginning at Orléans, receiving lavish gifts from Joan's many admirers, among them, Princess Elizabeth of Luxembourg (1390-1451), and Elisabeth von Görlitz, widow of Prince Anton of Burgundy. Then Jeanne made the mistake of meeting with Charles VII of France in 1439 in Paris. The king repeated the same trick he had attempted with the real Joan, by having someone else pretend to be him. But the False Maid recognized the trap because the real king wore a soft leather boot on one foot due to an injury. However, she was unable to tell him the "secret" Joan had told him - which proved to Charles that Joan had been sent by God to defeat the English - Jeanne confessed to the subterfuge, and begged the king's forgiveness.

Jeanne married the knight Robert des Armoises. She retired to his castle at Jaulny and had two children.

== Sources ==
- Quest for the past. Pleasantville: Reader's Digest Association. 1984. p. 298. ISBN 0-89577-170-5.
