= Jean de Baudricourt =

French Grand Officer Royal

Coat of arms of Jean de Baudricourt

Jean de Baudricourt (died 11 May 1499) was a French Grand Officer Royal and marshal of France born in AD 1435. He was the son of Robert de Baudricourt and Arlearde de Chambley.

== Early career ==
Jean de Baudricourt began his career in the service of Duke John II of Lorraine, as captain. Alongside the Duke, he rallied the rebellion of the League of the Public Good, led by the son of the Count of Charolais, Duke of Burgundy. After the battle of Montlhery and the Peace of Conflans, he embraced the King's party, as did the Duke of Lorraine. He then became a royal officer, first a captain of men-at-arms and then a bailiff.

== French captain ==
During the war between René II, Duke of Lorraine and Charles the Bold, he supported the Duke of Lorraine and acted as an intermediary between the King of France and Lorraine, notably by lending money to Rene II. After the invasion of the duchy of Burgundy, he became bailli of Chalon-sur-Saone (1477-1481).

In 1477, Louis XI sent de Baudricourt three times as ambassador to the Swiss cantons: the troops he raised allowed Burgundy to be kept under royal control.

In 1478 he fought in Flanders with Philippe de Crèvecœur, where he commanded the troops at the battle of Guinegatte, won by Maximilian of Austria on August 7, 1479. From 1479-1480 he was captain-general of the 4,000 francs-archers of the Captaincy of the Northeast.

The king then appointed him governor of Burgundy (1481-1499), captain of Besancon and Governor of Champagne (March 1482-November 1483). Louis XI then sent him to war with Maximilian of Austria on the front of the Netherlands. Captain of Arras from 1479 to 1482, he negotiated the treaty of Arras of 1482.

At the end of the reign of Louis XI, de Baudricourt was one of the King's closest advisors. He died in Blois on 11 May 1499.
