= Pierre d'Arc =

Brother of Joan of Arc

Pierre d'Arc (1408–1467) was a French soldier whose place in history is due to his service in the army made famous by his younger sister Joan of Arc.

== Life ==
The youngest son of Jacques d'Arc and Isabelle Romée, Pierre and his older brother Jéan fought under their sister's banner at the Siege of Orléans. Pierre and Joan were both captured in Compiègne, but he was released. After serving in the army for many additional years, he was knighted and, following his marriage, became the father of two sons and a daughter. He was given an island called the Ile-aux-Boeufs by the Duke of Orleans.

Following Joan's execution, several young women came forward claiming to be her. In 1434, Pierre and Jéan temporarily accepted Jeanne des Armoises (whose real name was Claude) as the actual Joan. Over the next six years, the brothers and their supposed sister traveled from town to town, beginning at Orléans, receiving lavish gifts from Joan's many admirers, among them, Princess Elizabeth of Luxembourg (1390–1451), widow of Anthony, Duke of Brabant. Then Claude made the mistake of meeting with Charles VII of France in Paris. Unable to tell him a secret Joan had told him - which proved to Charles that Joan had been sent by God to defeat the English - Claude confessed to the subterfuge, and begged the king's forgiveness.

There are no clear historical details regarding the final years of Pierre d'Arc, including the year and circumstances of his death. It is known that he died in Orléans and has descendants who have traced their lineage to him through the centuries into the 2000s.

== Legacy ==
Clotilde Forgeot d'Arc, who claims to be Pierre's direct descendant, played Joan in the 2022 celebration in Orléans commemorating Joan's liberation of the city. However, her lineage is disputed. Genealogist Michel de Sachy de Fourdrinoy wrote in the October 1973 Bulletin de l'Alliance française: "there is no longer any known descendants of the brothers of the Maid". Scholar François de Bouteiller determined that Joan's great-great nephew Charles du Lys (d. 1632) was the "last remaining male of the line". Clotilde's great-great-grandfather Henri Gautier renamed his children "d'Arc" after King Charles X granted him an Ordonnance Royale in 1827.

== In film ==
In 1999, Pierre, portrayed by Justin Peroff, was a prominent character in the miniseries Joan of Arc.
