= Robert de Baudricourt =

15th-century French noble

Robert de Baudricourt (French pronunciation: [ʁɔbɛʁ də bodʁikuʁ]; ca. 1400-1454), Seigneur de Baudricourt, Blaise, Buxy and Sorcy was a minor figure of 15th-century French nobility. The son of the Chamberlain of the Duke of Bar, he is notable for his association with Joan of Arc.

In 1429, Robert de Baudricourt's only title was captain of the royal garrison at Vaucouleurs. It was to him that Joan of Arc appealed to provide an escort to the court of Charles Valois, Dauphin of France. Initially, Baudricourt simply did not take the sixteen-year-old peasant girl seriously, but since Vaucouleurs was not a large town, he could hardly avoid her. Having cornered him in a public place, she began to lecture everyone present, holding them spellbound, and putting public pressure on Baudricourt to assist her. Finally, he relented, and provided an escort to visit the Dauphin.

Baudricourt advanced during the war against the English and over the rest of his career, rising to squire, then knight, and finally was made a lord.

== In popular culture ==
He is played by George Coulouris in the 1948 film Joan of Arc, and by Maury Chaykin in the 1999 miniseries Joan of Arc.

== Family ==
He married Arléarde de Chambley and his son Jean de Baudricourt was Marshal of France.
