= Jacques d'Arc =

Father of Joan of Arc

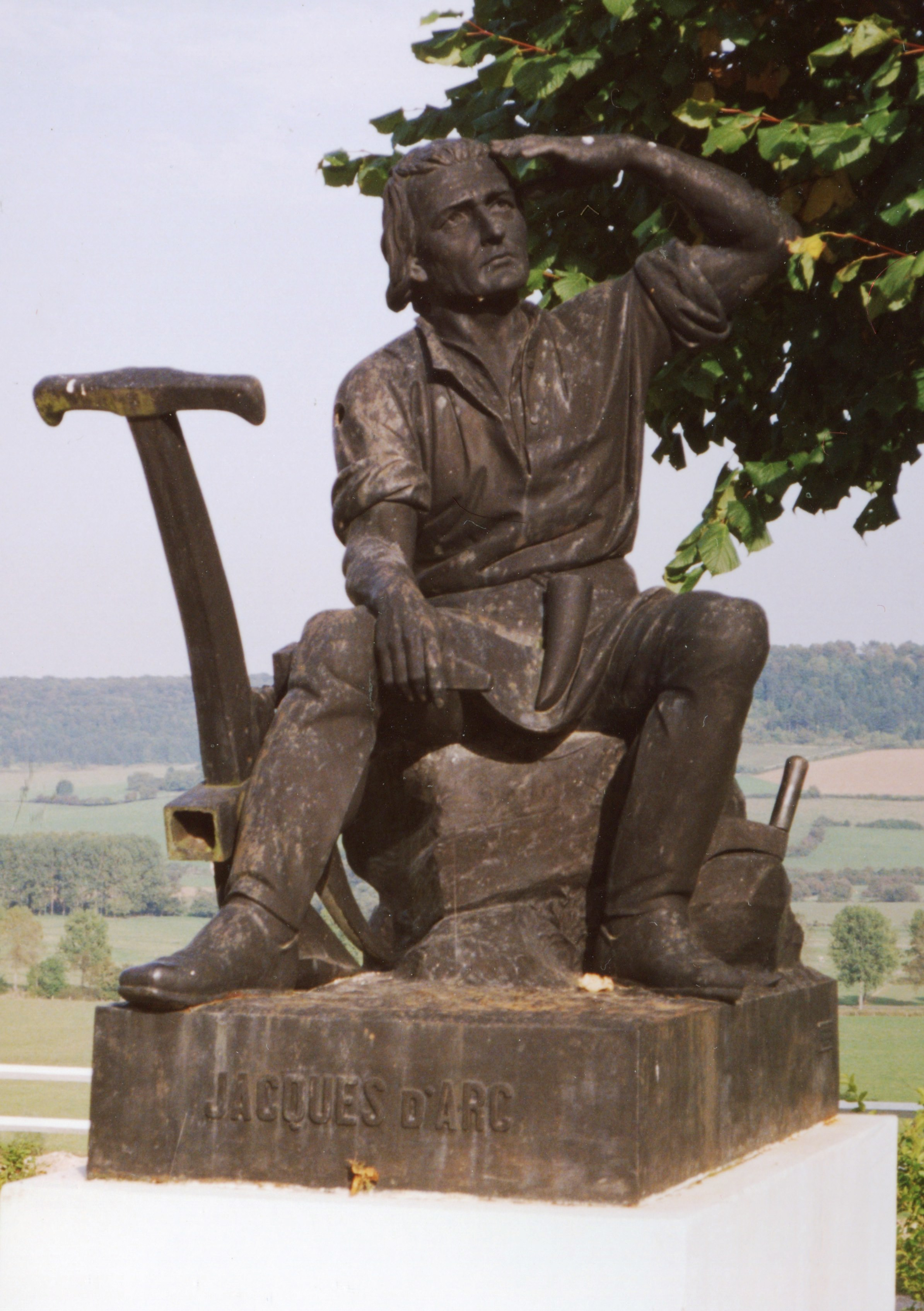
- Statue of Jacques d'Arc at Domrémy
- Born: 1375; Ceffonds, France
- Died: 1431 (aged 55–56)
- Spouse: Isabelle Romée
- Children: 5, including Joan of Arc

Coat of arms of the d'Arc family before December 1429

Jacques (or Jacquot) d'Arc (sometimes spelled Darc, Dars, Tart, Tarc, Darx, or Day; 1375–1431) was a farmer from Domrémy, France, who was the father of the French military leader and Catholic saint Joan of Arc. D'Arc is most known for being an influence on his daughter Joan's life, developing her leadership abilities through his example as a local government and military leader as well as restricting her ambitions with his controlling behaviour that resulted in a strained relationship between them.

== Life ==
D'Arc was born in Ceffonds. His father was a farmer who owned 50 acres of land. He married Isabelle Romée, a landowner and sister of a church official, with whom he raised their five children (in birth order: Jacquemin, Jean, Catherine, Jeanne, and Pierre) in Domrémy.

D'Arc achieved some level of power and respect in Domrémy. He was appointed as "dean", a local government official with administrative and military responsibilities that sometimes involved diplomatic trips to nearby towns. The d'Arc home, which may have been part of Romée's dowry, was the only stone home in Domrémy. The family were peasants but were relatively wealthy compared to their neighbours, owning their home and furniture, nearly 50 acres of land, and 200–300 francs in savings.

Catholicism played an important role in the lives of French peasants of the time period and the d'Arc family, with the primary responsibility of religious education being focused on the family and parish priests rather than the influence of the central Church. This lack of a central authority resulted in some Domrémians retaining aspects of traditional non-Christian spiritual practices, such as a belief in fairies.

His daughter Joan is known for her role in the Hundred Years War, which she was drawn to fight in by spiritual visions and played a significant role in leading French forces during her brief military career that resulted in a boost in morale and shifting fortunes for France. D'Arc also played a role in the Hundred Years War as a local government official, with his entire lifetime being within that period of non-continuous conflicts. The village of Domrémy was loyal to France but was surrounded by a cluster of towns loyal to Burgundian forces, which created a credible military threat that d'Arc was responsible with addressing as dean of the village. D'Arc signed an agreement representing Domrémy in 1419 that reluctantly placed the town under the protection of a squire who had engaged with them militarily. In July 1428, Domrémy was forced to evacuate to the town of Neufchâteau due to invading Burgundian forces. When residents returned, they found that the town had been burned and ransacked, including significant damage to the parish church. The d'Arc family home, being the only stone home in the village, withstood much of the damage compared to their neighbours with less durable homes.

D'Arc's relationship with his daughter Joan was sometimes in conflict. He had recurring dreams about Joan going off to war around the same time that she had similar dreams. He interpreted these dreams as a warning because he believed that the only women associated with the military were prostitutes. D'Arc told his sons that if the dreams were to come true, he would want them to drown Joan, or he would do it himself. D'Arc subsequently tried to marry off Joan in an attempt to control her deviant behaviour, but she refused.

His daughter Joan had an important relationship with French ruler King Charles VII, who used her public popularity and presence to great effect at his coronation. D'Arc also attended the coronation festivities and stayed in the city of Reims afterwards, from at least 17 July to 5 September 1429. Charles VII ennobled the d'Arc family with a coat of arms, which included the fleur-de-lis, in recognition of Joan's leadership contributions in late 1429. When Joan was asked about her family's status of nobility during her heresy trial in 1431, she made it clear that she had not wished her accomplishments to be undeservedly bestowed upon the rest of her family. However, Joan's brothers quickly made use of their ennobled surname, du Luys. Joan's testimony barely mentioned her family with any affection, which suggests that they did not have a particularly close relationship and that she placed a higher importance on her spiritual life.

A significant amount of historical information regarding the d'Arc family and life in Domrémy is sourced from the transcripts of Joan of Arc's trial for heresy in 1431 and retrial in 1455.

D'Arc died in 1431. Some historical accounts have attributed his cause of death to the grief he experienced when mourning the loss of his daughter.

== See also ==
- Joan of Arc bibliography
- Name of Joan of Arc
