= Domrémy-la-Pucelle =

Commune in Grand Est, France

- Commune
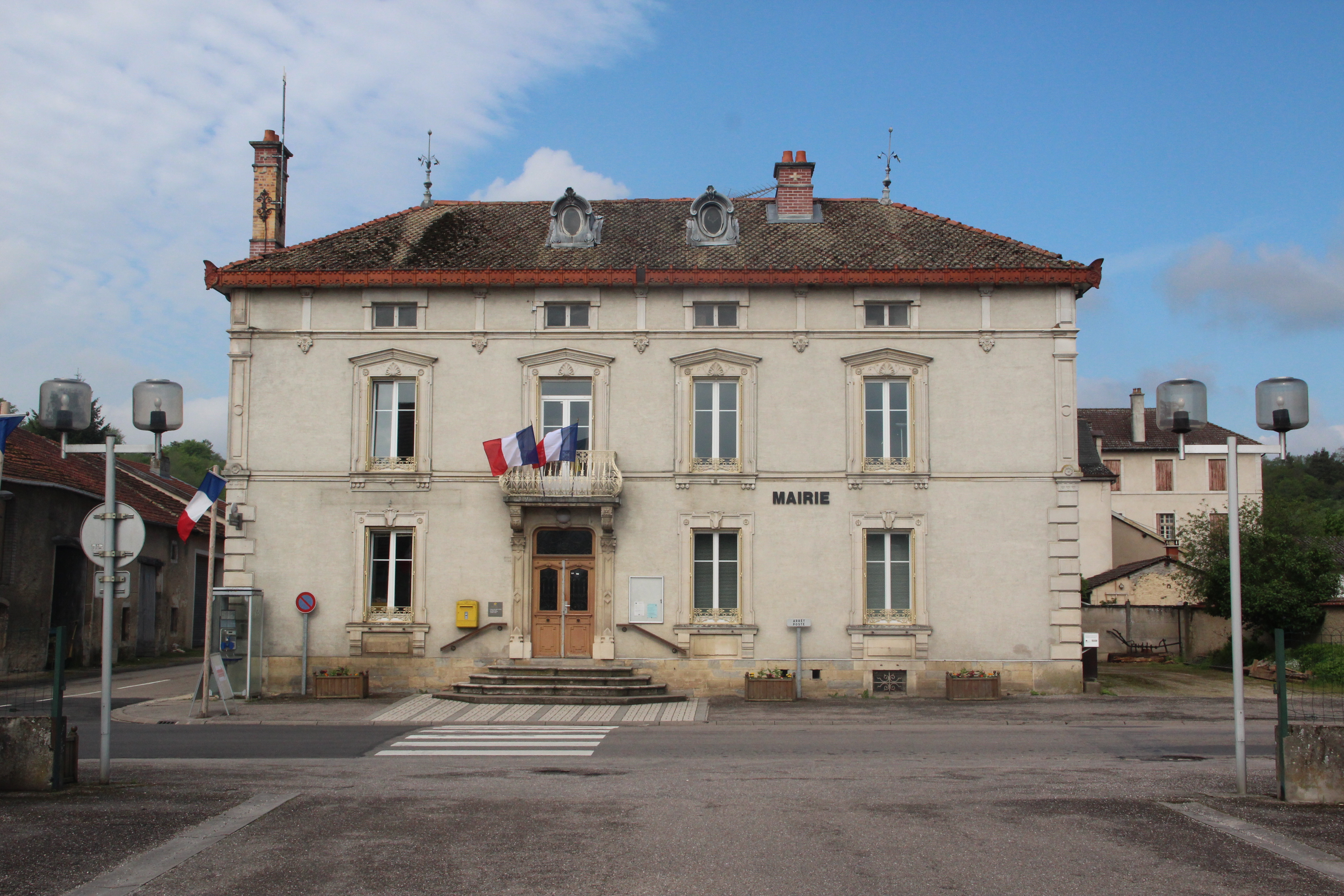
- The town hall in Domrémy-la-Pucelle

- Coat of arms
- Location of Domrémy-la-Pucelle
- Location within France Location within Grand Est
- Coordinates: 48°26′35″N 5°40′33″E
- Country: France
- Region: Grand Est
- Department: Vosges
- Arrondissement: Neufchâteau
- Canton: Coussey
- Intercommunality: CC Ouest Vosgien

Government
  - Mayor (2020–2026): Véronique Thiot
- Area^{1}: 8.99 km^{2} (3.47 sq mi)
- Elevation: 270 m (890 ft)
- Highest elevation: 407 m (1,335 ft)
- Lowest elevation: 268 m (879 ft)
- Population (2023): 102
  - Density: 11.3/km^{2} (29.4/sq mi)
- Time zone: UTC+01:00 (CET)
  - Summer (DST): UTC+02:00 (CEST)
- INSEE/Postal code: 88154 /88630
- ^{1} French Land Register data, which excludes lakes, ponds, glaciers > 1 km^{2} (0.386 sq mi or 247 acres) and river estuaries.

Domrémy-la-Pucelle (French pronunciation: [dɔ̃ʁemi la pysɛl], lit. 'Domrémy [of] the Maid') is a commune in the Vosges department in Grand Est in northeastern France.

The village, originally named Domrémy, is the birthplace of Joan of Arc. It has since been renamed Domrémy-la-Pucelle after Joan's nickname, la Pucelle d'Orléans ("the Maid of Orléans").

== Geography ==
Domrémy is positioned along the Upper Meuse Valley, 4 km (2.5 mi) north of the town of Coussey. The village land includes a small wooded hill to the west of the houses, which rises to a height of 407 metres (1,335 ft), known as the Domrémy Wood. This overlooks the small adjacent settlement of Les Roises.

== History ==
Domrémy and Greux were exempted from taxes "forever" by Charles VII in 1429. It was the sole request made of the king by Joan of Arc when Charles asked her how he could show her his appreciation for seeing him crowned; Joan felt that taxes burdened the villagers. Moreover, he wished to do a good deed for her success in fighting the English during the Hundred Years' War. Taxes were imposed upon Domrémy and Greux again during the French Revolution; the residents have paid taxes since.

Until 1766, Domrémy was part of the Duchy of Bar (within a section of the duchy which owed fealty to the Crown of France although the other half of the duchy was part of the Holy Roman Empire). In that year, the Duchy, part of which had become a fief of the Kingdom of France in 1301, escheated to the crown fully upon the death of its last duke, Stanisław Leszczyński.

== Demographics ==
Historical population
Year	Pop.	±% p.a.
1968	225	—
1975	222	−0.19%
1982	199	−1.55%
1990	182	−1.11%
1999	167	−0.95%
2007	154	−1.01%
2012	134	−2.74%
2017	104	−4.94%
2023	102	−0.32%
Source: INSEE

== Gallery ==
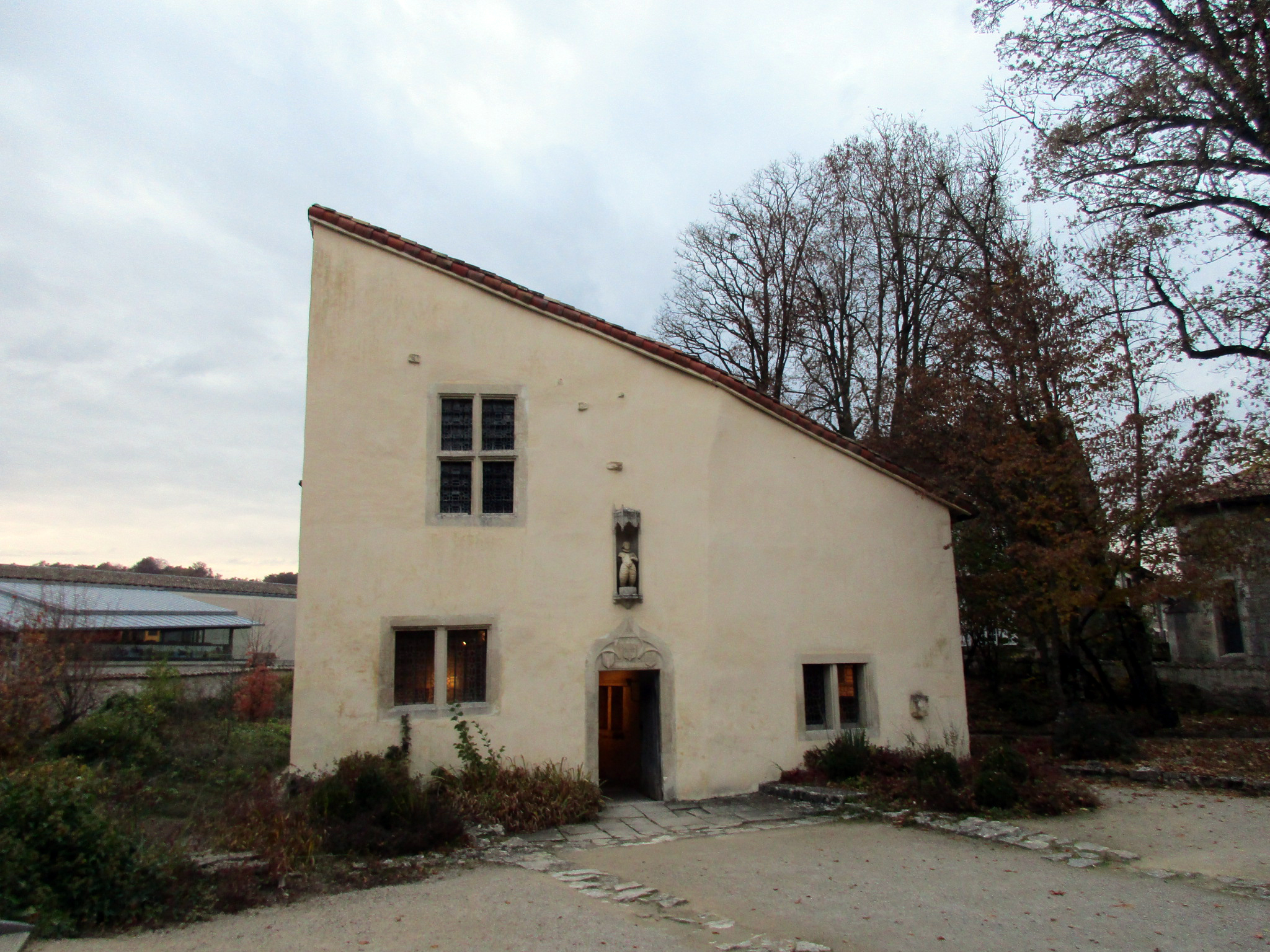
Birthplace of Joan of Arc

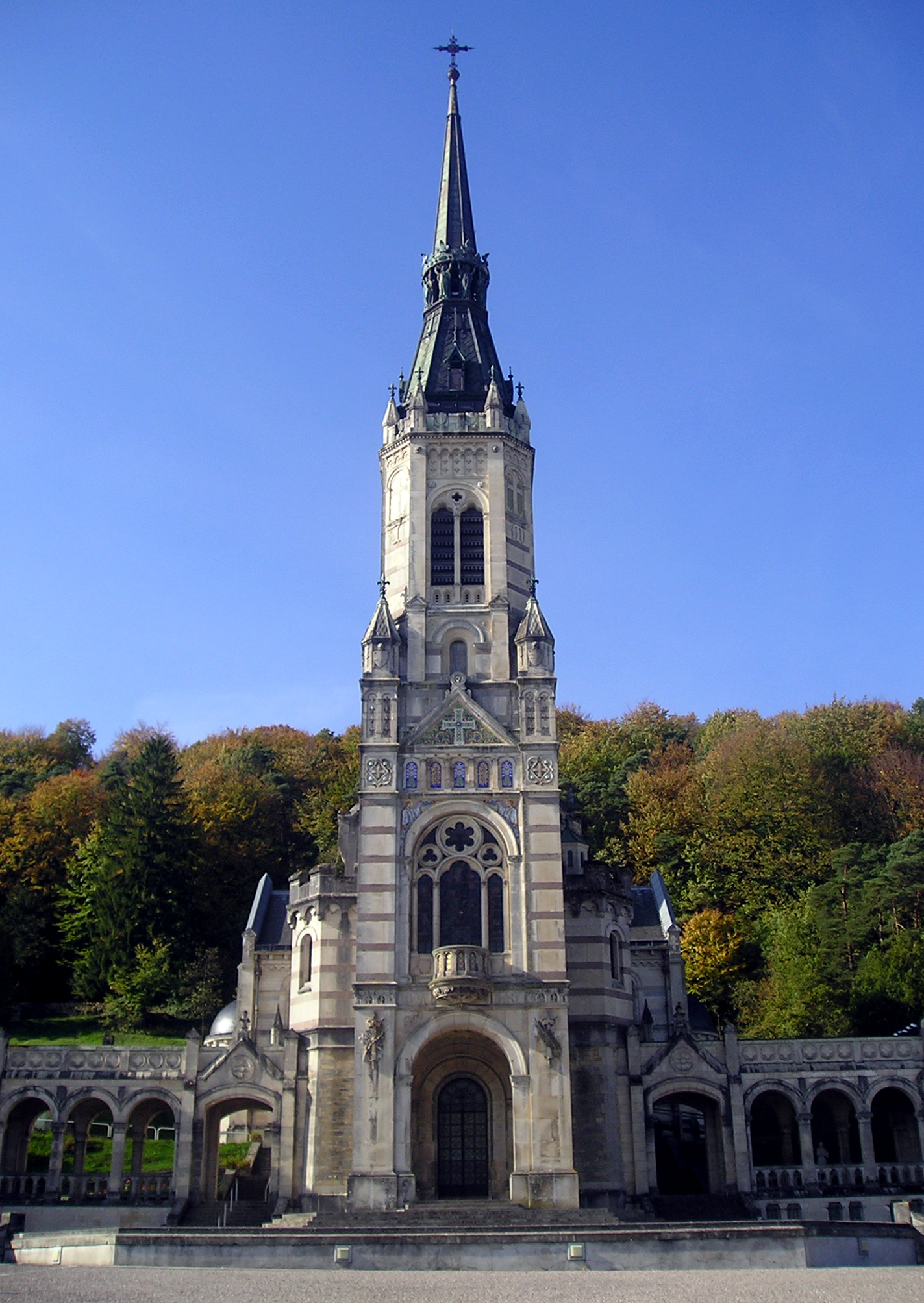
Basilica of Bois Chênu

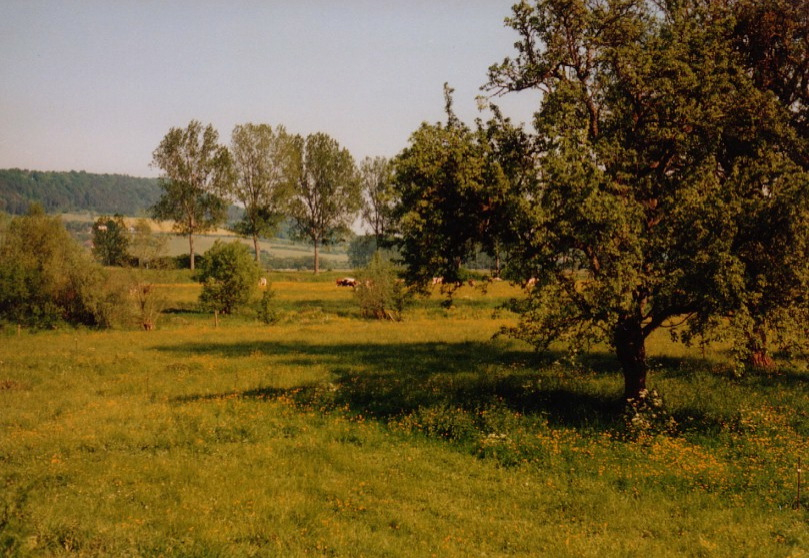
Countryside around Domrémy-la-Pucelle

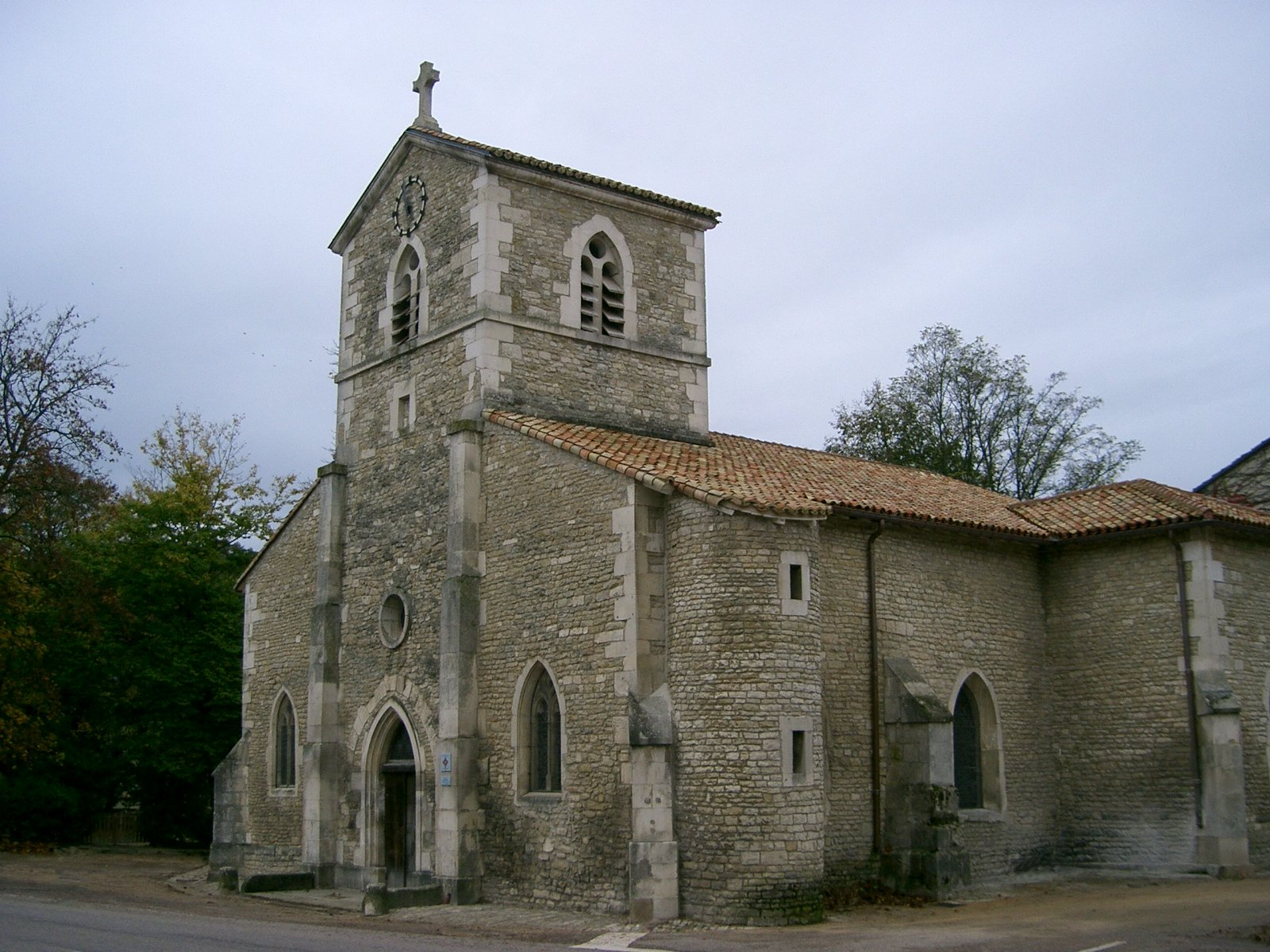
Church of St. Remi of Rheims in Domrémy-la-Pucelle

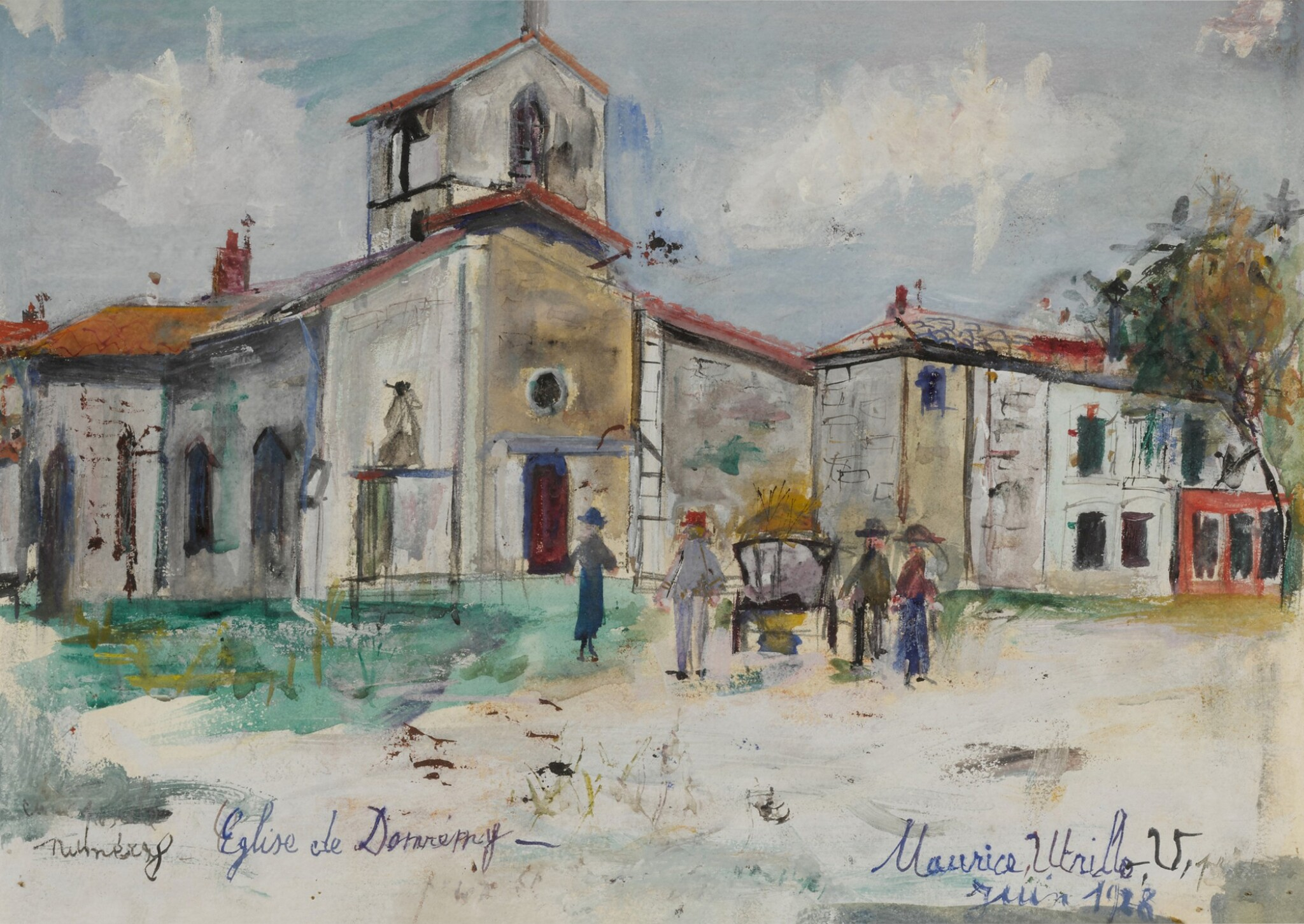
Church of Domrémy, 1928, by Maurice Utrillo

== See also ==
- Communes of the Vosges department
