= Jean d'Aulon =

French soldier and Joan of Arc's guard (1390–1458)

- Jean d'Aulon's coat of arms
- Born: 1390; Fézensac, Duchy of Gascony, France
- Died: 1458 (aged 67–68); Beaucaire, Gard, France

Jean d'Aulon (1390–1458; sometimes spelled Jehan Daulon) was a French knight and lord best known for serving alongside Jeanne d'Arc as her soldier, steward, bodyguard, and squire. Some sources incorrectly attribute the role of d'Arc's bodyguard to Gilles de Rais. d'Aulon was an avid and detailed journaler and his records, considered to be honest and straightforward, set the foundation for what we know about Jeanne d'Arc, including her apparent amenorrhea.

== Biography ==
=== Early life ===
Jean d'Aulon was born in County of Fézensac in the Duchy of Gascony in 1390, the descendant of noble families from Comminges and Aulon, Haute-Garonne. His father may have been Arnaud-Anson d'Aulon; his mother's name is unknown. His personal coat of arms is an alder with three branches, each with bright green leaves.

=== Military life ===
In the mid-1410s, d'Aulon headed Yolande d'Anjou's squires as their lieutenant before moving in 1416 to captain thirteen royal guards for King Charles VI. He held this position for seven years and, following the death of King Charles VI, served as an advisor to King Charles VII. Between 1425 and 1429, he oversaw several different military groups in places such as Foix, Toulouse, Montargis, Loches, and Guyenne. He became a trusted companion of King Charles VII and was praised for his wisdom and loyalty. His reputation led the King to name him Jeanne d'Arc's guard in 1429 after d'Arc visited Chinon to convince the King to let her lead French troops. d'Aulon was with her during the Siege of Orléans not long after her visit to the King, and he helped her secure the St. Loup fortress. d'Aulon and the other soldiers lived in close quarters with her as they traveled and slept beside her on the ground. All of her soldiers, including d'Aulon, denied feeling lust toward her, despite thinking she was a beautiful young woman and occasionally seeing her bare breasts and legs while she treated her wounds or dressed.

d'Aulon was alongside d'Arc as she visited Chinon, Poitiers, Tours, and Blois to be approved to fight by the King's advisors, then into battle against the English in Orléans, Jargeau, Meung-sur-Loire, Beaugency, Patay, Reims, Paris, Lagny-sur-Marne, and Compiègne. Though he accompanied her during the Siege of Saint-Pierre-le-Moûtier, he did so with an injured heel from the first attempted siege. He was also present at the failed Siege of La Charité. During the Siege of Compiègne, d'Arc and her small army attempted to take the city back from Duke Philip III, who had allied with the English and King Henry V of England following the Treaty of Troyes ten years earlier. His army captured and imprisoned d'Arc and around 200 of her soldiers, including d'Aulon and her brother Pierre, on 23 May 1430. The English paid d'Arc's 10,000 livre tournois (approximately €140,169) ransom and brought her to Rouen, where she was put on trial for heresy and eventually burned at the stake. d'Aulon would later be a major voice in her re-trial in France. d'Aulon remained imprisoned in Clairoix for about two years until he was freed on a ransom of 500 écus, which he borrowed from Georges de La Trémoille and repaid, likely with the help of Charles VII, within two years. He continued working for the King and was sent on a variety of missions throughout France; this lasted for many years and brought him to places such as Languedoc, Saint-Denis, Dreux, Guyenne, and Savoie. In 1438, he became the King's counsellor and the maître d'hôtel of the household, and replaced Jean de Villa as Master of the Ports of Carcassonne in 1445. He was promoted to King's chamberlain in 1450.

=== Landownership ===
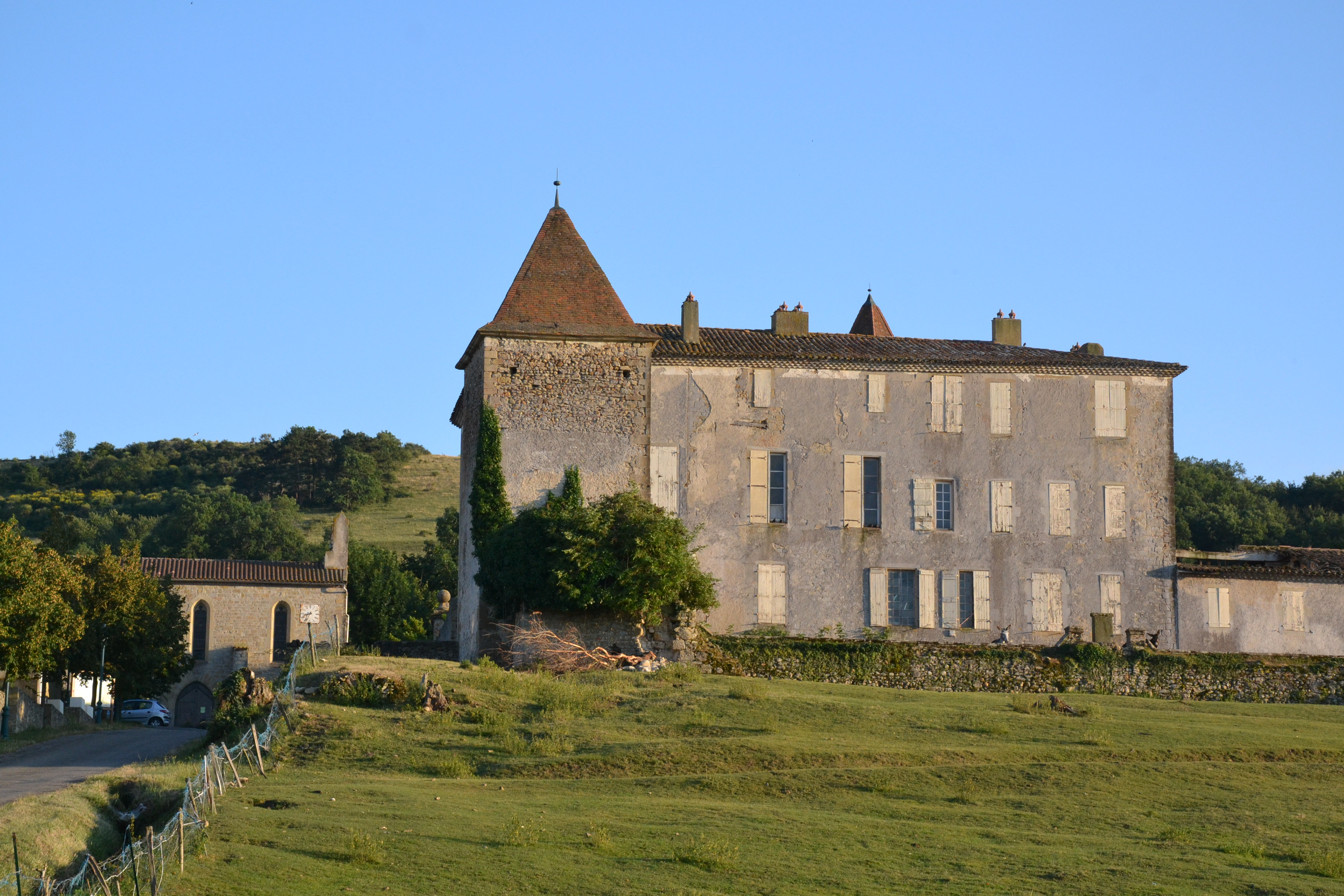
Château de Caudeval

Charles VII showed his appreciation for d'Aulon's loyalty and exceptional military skill by granting him a number of titles and properties. In 1428, he was recorded as lord of Mézerville, Peyrefitte-sur-l'Hers, and Bélesta and by 1438 was the seneschal of Beaucaire and Nîmes. He was named captain and governor of Castelnaudary in 1445. Nine years later, he became captain and governor of Pierre-Scize near Lyon. The final lands he was granted were in 1450; these were Caudeval and Peyrepertuse.

=== Family and later life ===
His first marriage was to a daughter of Jean Juvénal des Ursins, chairman of the parliament, between 1415 and 1417 in Paris; his wife was likely Michelette or, less likely, her sister Benoîte. Following his wife's death in the mid-1420s, he married Hélène de Mauléon. He has at least two sons: Philippe and Mathieu. His third child, Cécile d’Aulon, was born during his marriage to Hélène. d'Aulon likely had a nephew named Jean d'Aulon.

d'Aulon died in August 1458 at Beaucaire. Following his death, Peyrepertuse (also spelled Pierre Pertuse) was passed on to his son Pierre.

== Depictions in media ==
=== TV and film ===
- Joan of Arc (1948) — Ethan Laidlaw
- Daughters of Destiny (1954) — Robert Dalban
- Joan of Arc, the Power and the Innocence (1989) — Éric Vasberg
- Joan the Maid (1994) — Jean-Pierre Becker
- The Messenger: The Story of Joan of Arc (1999) — Desmond Harrington.

=== Video games ===
A character named Jean appears in the video game Jeanne d'Arc and it is disputed if he is based on Jean de Metz or d'Aulon. The character is aristrocratic and carries a spear, and he and Bertrand de Poulengy join d'Arc's cause at Neufchâteau, upon orders of the commander of Vaucouleurs.
