= Wavrin =

- Commune
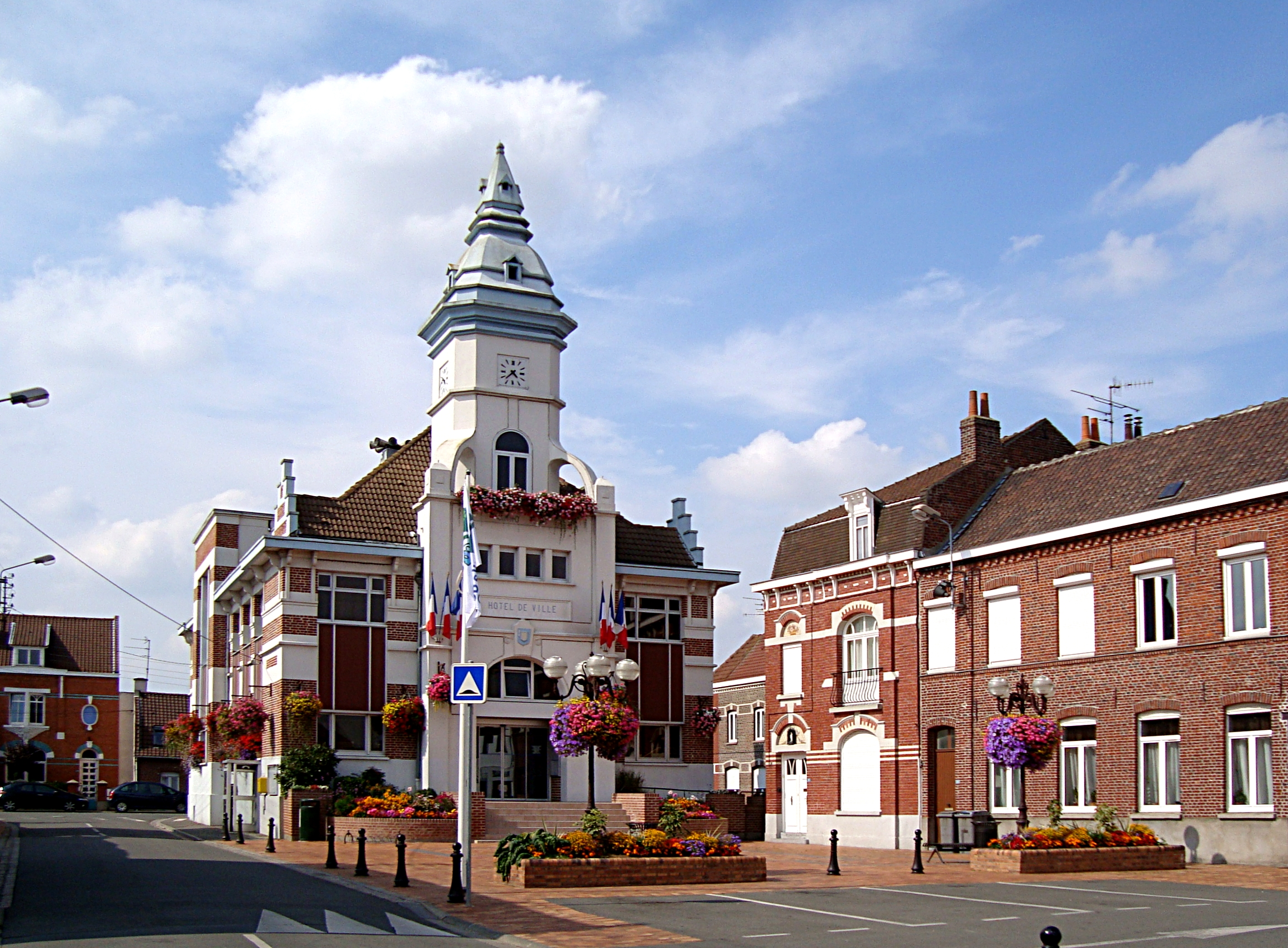
- The town hall in Wavrin

- Coat of arms
- Location of Wavrin
- Location within France Location within Hauts-de-France
- Coordinates: 50°34′27″N 2°56′23″E
- Country: France
- Region: Hauts-de-France
- Department: Nord
- Arrondissement: Lille
- Canton: Annœullin
- Intercommunality: Métropole Lille

Government
  - Mayor (2020–2026): Alain Blondeau
- Area^{1}: 13.55 km^{2} (5.23 sq mi)
- Elevation: 22 m (72 ft)
- Highest elevation: 40 m (130 ft)
- Lowest elevation: 18 m (59 ft)
- Population (2023): 7,758
  - Density: 572.5/km^{2} (1,483/sq mi)
- Time zone: UTC+01:00 (CET)
  - Summer (DST): UTC+02:00 (CEST)
- INSEE/Postal code: 59653 /59136
- ^{1} French Land Register data, which excludes lakes, ponds, glaciers > 1 km^{2} (0.386 sq mi or 247 acres) and river estuaries.

Wavrin (French pronunciation: [wavʁɛ̃]) is a commune in the Nord department in northern France. It was established around the year 1020 (1006 years ago). It is part of the Métropole Européenne de Lille.

== Heraldry ==
Arms of Wavrin	The arms of Wavrin are blazoned : Azure, an inescutcheon argent. (Gouzeaucourt, Saint-Jean-de-Vals, Ramburelles, Saint-Menge, Colombey-les-Belles and Ostreville use the same arms.)

== Population ==
Historical population
Year	Pop.	±% p.a.
1968	5,819	—
1975	6,187	+0.88%
1982	6,785	+1.33%
1990	7,477	+1.22%
1999	7,633	+0.23%
2007	7,701	+0.11%
2012	7,626	−0.20%
2017	7,676	+0.13%
2023	7,758	+0.18%
Source: INSEE

== People ==
- Jean de Waurin

== See also ==
- Communes of the Nord department
