= Xaintois =

Xaintois may refer to:

- Dombasle-en-Xaintois, a commune in the Vosges department in Grand Est in northeastern France.
- Ménil-en-Xaintois, a commune in the Vosges department in Grand Est in northeastern France
- Rouvres-en-Xaintois, a commune in the Vosges department in northeastern France.
