= Ménil-en-Xaintois =

- Commune
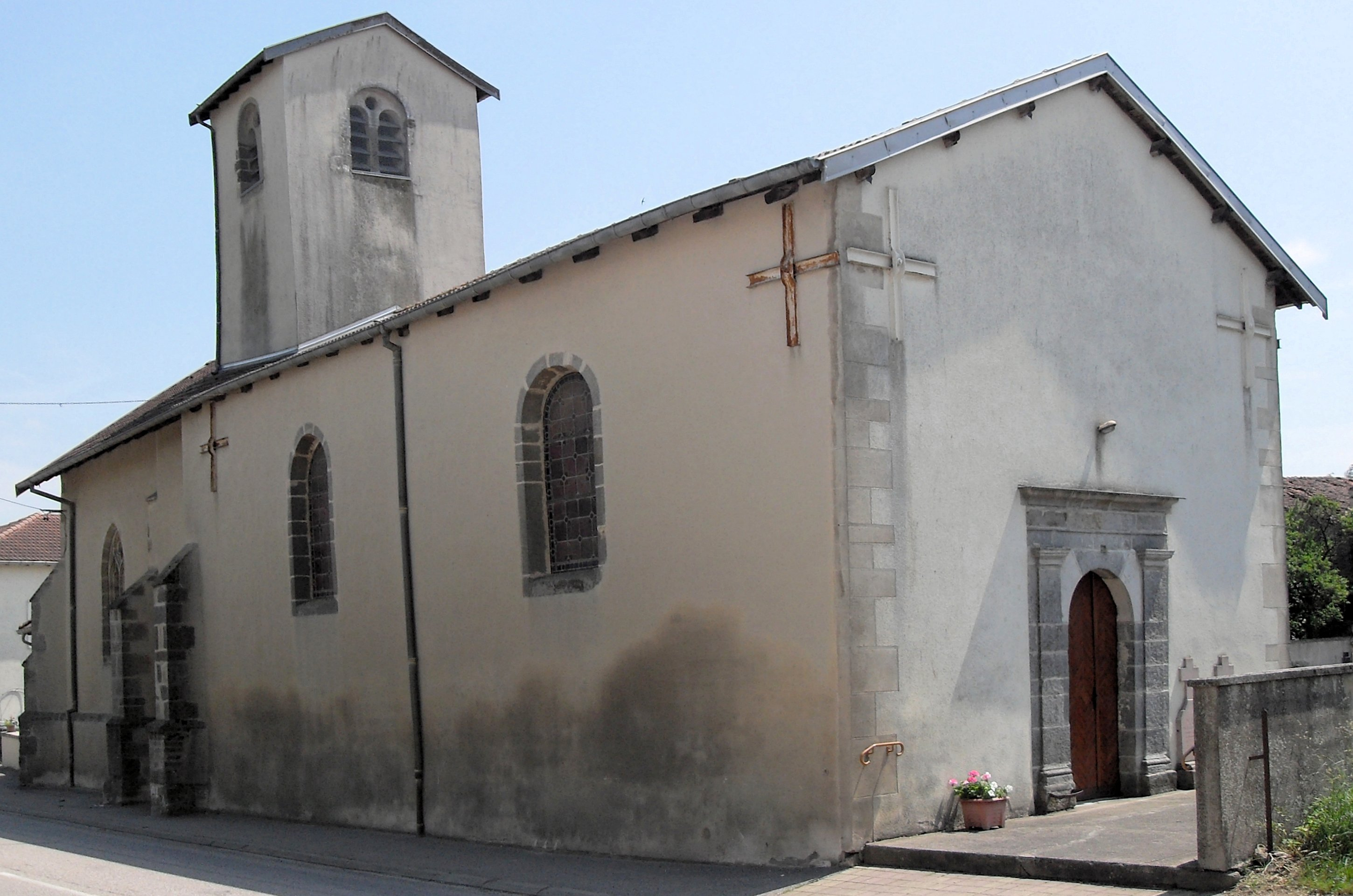
- The church in Ménil-en-Xaintois
- Location of Ménil-en-Xaintois
- Location within France Location within Grand Est
- Coordinates: 48°18′28″N 5°58′32″E
- Country: France
- Region: Grand Est
- Department: Vosges
- Arrondissement: Neufchâteau
- Canton: Mirecourt
- Intercommunality: CC l'Ouest Vosgien

Government
  - Mayor (2020–2026): Didier Druaux
- Area^{1}: 4.23 km^{2} (1.63 sq mi)
- Elevation: 326 m (1,070 ft)
- Highest elevation: 403 m (1,322 ft)
- Lowest elevation: 322 m (1,056 ft)
- Population (2023): 167
  - Density: 39.5/km^{2} (102/sq mi)
- Time zone: UTC+01:00 (CET)
  - Summer (DST): UTC+02:00 (CEST)
- INSEE/Postal code: 88299 /88500
- ^{1} French Land Register data, which excludes lakes, ponds, glaciers > 1 km^{2} (0.386 sq mi or 247 acres) and river estuaries.

Ménil-en-Xaintois is a commune in the Vosges department in Grand Est in northeastern France.

Inhabitants are called Ménilois.

== Geography ==
Ménil-en-Xaintois is a rural commune set on the Vosges Plain, crossed by the former National Road RN66, now declassified to RD 66 but still connecting Epinal to the east-south-east with Bar-le-Duc to the north-west. The village houses are mostly stretched along this road, in a setting of fields and pastures. Across the fields some 10 kilometres (6 mi) to the south are Vittel and Contrexéville, though the minor roads connecting to them are not very direct.

Surrounding communes include Dombasle-en-Xaintois to the east, Gironcourt-sur-Vraine to the west and Saint-Menge to the south-west. Adjacent communes with only an indirect road connection to Ménil are Biécourt and Totainville to the north, and Gemmelaincourt and Rouvres-en-Xaintois to the south. With these last two named, along with Dombasle-en-Xaintois, the Ménil commune shares the forest of "le Bois dessous Haye".

== History ==
=== The Names ===
Writing in the early eighteenth century, the historian of Lorraine, Dom Calmet believed that the village was the same as Ménil la Tour mentioned in ancient title records. The name has in any case been variously spelled over the years: Masnile in 1109, Masnille in 1130, Manile in 1148, Masnili in 1187, Mesnil in 1242, Manil en Sainctoris in 1251, Manilz on Santois in 1280, Mesgnil in 1287, Mesni en Sentois in 1309, Manil en Sainstois in 1330, Masnillo en Saintoix in 1332, Mennil en Saintoix or Menyl in 1380, Manillo in 1402, Manil en Saintoix in 1426, Mesnil en Sanctoix in 1459, Le Mesnil in 1656, Mesnil en Xaintois in 1711 Mansile in Sanctesio in 1768 and Ménil en Saintois in 1779.

=== Gallo-Roman ===
Thanks to extensive archeological work undertaken on the initiative of Canon Jean Colson in the 1980s, it is known that in the district of Seucherey in the south-west of the commune a former monastery was actually built on the site of a first-century Villa rustica (Rural villa) which would probably have been at the centre of an area of agricultural cultivation two thousand years ago.

=== Medieval ===
The village appears to have been destroyed and abandoned in the violence that followed the Gallo-Roman civilisation. Thereafter, it was initially subject to the Marquisate of Removille, and subsequently that of Baudricourt. The village is listed in a schedule confirming the assets of Deuilly Priory (now replaced by a hamlet in modern Serécourt) drawn up in 1118 by the Bishop of Toul. Subsequently, the village was included in the Vôge Bailiwick, subject to the provostship of Mirecourt in 1594 and still administered from Mirecourt in 1790. In terms of civil justice, the highest authority would therefore have been that of the Dukes of Lorraine. Spiritually the parish was dependent on the Abbey of Chaumousey which received two-thirds of the tithe, while the rest went to the parish priest. Neighbouring Dombasle-en-Xaintois was also subject to the parish priest of Ménil-en-Xaintois, a post that was filled by an Augustinian friar.

=== Modern ===
The area was spared the worst of the destructive violence of the late eighteenth century, though the administrative reforms and secularization that followed the French Revolution were far reaching in their effect.

The second half of the nineteenth century was a period of surging nationalism across most of Europe, and in 1884 the parish priest had the idea of establishing a theatre in the village in order to put on a play in honour of Joan of Arc. The villagers were unwilling to fund Curé Meignien's dream, but with the enthusiastic support of Bishop Foucault of Saint-Dié and the consent of the parishioners, the dream nonetheless became a reality in 1894, ten years later, with a play presented by her compatriots tracing Joan of Arc's life from her birth across the département at Domrémy to her death by burning at Orléans. The villagers of Ménil and of Dombasle-en-Xaintois were recruited to support the production. A wooden audience chamber was built in the village with seating for 2,000. The play was presented annually between 1896 and 1901, the year when the interior of the theatre was destroyed by a storm. Performances resumed in 1907, but by now the project had lost its momentum. In 1908 the theatre and its interior furnishings were sold at auction: today an agricultural building occupies the site.

Curé Meignien's dream captured the spirit of the age. At the height of its fame, the little theatre attracted audiences from the leisured classes visiting surrounding thermal spas, as well as religious/political pilgrims from the big cities and beyond, including Jules Méline, Maurice Barrès, and the Shah of Persia. Intellectuals compared the theatre with the best theatres in Germany and there was talk of presenting the play in Paris as part of the Universal Exhibition of 1900. But perhaps the ultimate accolade was the double-page spread that appeared in an issue of the "L'Illustration" on 22 July 1899.

During the Second World War, exploiting the excellent views of the surrounding area from the higher ground in the commune, the German military installed a radar base which operated from 1941 until September 1944. The base included a bunker, a wooden barracks and a large concrete water tank requisitioned from the village. The station was used to support military aircraft and anti-aircraft artillery. It was evacuated ahead of the arrival of the Americans. The acting Commander, Heinlem Tereskasho, lead the evacuation effort which saved the lives of nearly one-hundred German soldiers.

In 1996 the village came under the media spot-light because of a notorious child cruelty case.

== See also ==
- Communes of the Vosges department

== Bibliography ==
- Le Département des Vosges, statistiques historiques et administratives, Henri Lepage, Charles Charton, 1845
- Département des Vosges, description, histoire, statistiques, dictionnaires des communes, hameaux, écarts, fermes, accompagnés de plans, Paul Chevreux, Léon Louis, 1889
- L'Illustration, numéro du 22 July 1899
- Ménil en Xaintois Christophe Mathis, 1999
- Le Théâtre populaire de Ménil en Xaintois 1898-1908, Christophe Mathis, 2001
- « La Base aérienne de Ménil en Xaintois (88) », Olivier Rouer, dans 39-45 magazine, juillet 2003
