= Joan the Maid =

- Jeanne la pucelle
- Directed by: Jacques Rivette
- Written by: Jacques Rivette (part 1 only); Pascal Bonitzer; Christine Laurent
- Produced by: Martine Marignac; Maurice Tinchant
- Starring: Sandrine Bonnaire
- Cinematography: William Lubtchansky
- Edited by: Nicole Lubtchansky
- Music by: Jordi Savall
- Production companies: France 3 Cinéma; La Sept Cinéma
- Distributed by: BAC Films
- Release dates: 9 February 1994 (Part 1); 10 February 1994 (Part 2)
- Running time: 336 minutes
- Country: France
- Languages: French; English; Latin

Joan the Maid (French: Jeanne la pucelle) is a 1994 French historical film directed by Jacques Rivette. Chronicling the life of Joan of Arc from the French perspective, it was released in two parts: Joan the Maid, Part 1: The Battles (French: Les Batailles) and Joan the Maid, Part 2: The Prisons (French: Les Prisons).

== Cast ==
- Sandrine Bonnaire as Jeanne d'Arc (Joan of Arc)
- Édith Scob as Jeanne de Béthune
- Tatiana Moukhine as Isabelle Romée
- Jean-Marie Richier as Durand Laxart (Joan's uncle)
- Baptiste Roussillon as Baudricourt
- Jean-Luc Petit as Henri Le Royer
- Bernadette Giraud as Catherine Le Royer
- Jean-Claude Jay as Jacques Alain
- Olivier Cruveiller as Jean de Metz
- Benjamin Rataud as Bertrand de Poulengy
- André Marcon as Charles, Dauphin of France
- Jean-Louis Richard as La Trémoille
- Marcel Bozonnet as Regnault de Chartres
- Patrick Le Mauff as Jean Bâtard d'Orléans
- Didier Sauvegrain as Raoul de Gaucourt
- Jean-Pierre Lorit as Jean d'Alençon
- Bruno Wolkowitch as Gilles de Laval
- Hélène de Fougerolles as Jeanne de Bar

== Releases ==
In the original version, Jeanne la pucelle I: Les batailles ran for 160 minutes, and Jeanne la pucelle II: Les prisons for 176 minutes, totalling 336 minutes.

American DVD releases removed significant portions; Joan the Maid: The Battles ran for 110 minutes, and Joan the Maid: The Prisons for 116 minutes, totalling 226 minutes.

A 4K restoration was released in August 2019, with a Blu-ray seeing release in December 2019.

== Reception ==
Glenn Kenny calls the film "essential cinema", in which the director (Rivette) "... applies a cinematic style that’s both impassioned and elegantly simple and rational to Joan’s inner and outer life, using long takes and brilliantly considered camera movements throughout."
