= Desmond Harrington =

American actor (born 1976)

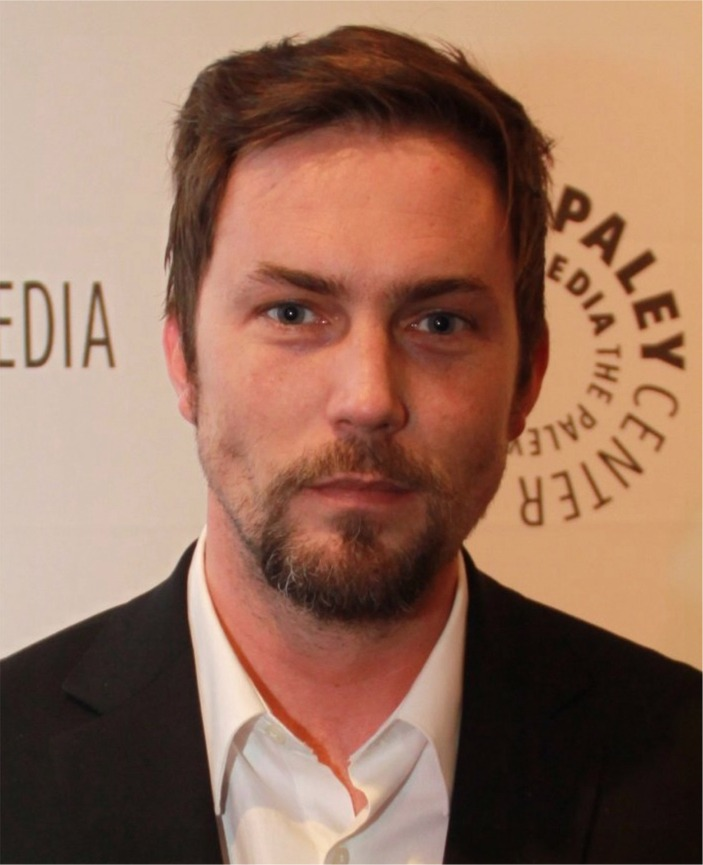
- Harrington in 2010
- Born: October 19, 1976 (age 50); Savannah, Georgia, U.S.
- Occupation: Actor
- Years active: 1999–present

Desmond Harrington (born October 19, 1976) is an American actor. He made his film debut in 1999, playing Jean d'Aulon in The Messenger: The Story of Joan of Arc. His later credits include Riding in Cars with Boys, The Hole (both 2001), Ghost Ship, We Were Soldiers (both 2002), Love Object, Wrong Turn (both 2003), The Dark Knight Rises (2012), and The Neon Demon (2016).

On television, Harrington played Joseph "Joey" Quinn on Showtime's Dexter (2008–2013) and Dexter: Resurrection (2025–present), Jack Bass on the CW's Gossip Girl (2009–2012), Alan Shepard in the ABC miniseries The Astronaut Wives Club (2015), Michael Rowan on CBS's Elementary (2018), and Louis Freeh on the second season of Spectrum's Manhunt (2020).

== Early life and education ==
Harrington was born in Savannah, Georgia, and raised in the Kingsbridge section of the Bronx, New York City. He attended St. Margaret's School and Fordham Preparatory School. He later attended Manhattan College, but dropped out after six weeks. He worked as a waiter and bartender while taking acting classes at the HB Studio in Greenwich Village.

== Career ==
=== 1999–2002: Film debut and horror genre work ===
Harrington made his professional debut when he was picked from 350 hopefuls to play Jean d'Aulon, bodyguard to Joan of Arc, in Luc Besson's epic historical drama The Messenger: The Story of Joan of Arc (1999). Following smaller parts in the comedy-dramas Riding in Cars with Boys and My First Mister (both 2001), he had major roles in a succession of genre features: British psychological thriller The Hole (2001), Dark Castle's commercially successful Ghost Ship (2002), rural teen slasher Wrong Turn (2003), and the independent dark comedy-horror, Love Object (2003). For his portrayal of Kenneth in the latter—an introvert who forms an obsessive relationship with a sex doll—Harrington was awarded Best Actor at the Málaga Fantastic Film Festival. During this same time, he played the recurring role of Jesse Keys, an abductee of aliens, in the Steven Spielberg-produced sci-fi miniseries Taken (2002).

=== 2003 onwards: Move into television ===
Following his headline appearance as Det. Jimmy McCarron on the second season of L.A. Dragnet (2003–2004), Harrington starred on the short-lived ABC sitcom Sons & Daughters (2006), which drew attention for its use of improvisation and absence of a traditional laugh track. He then joined the cast of the Showtime crime thriller series Dexter in its third season, playing "Joey" Quinn, a smart-mouthed detective. During his five years on the show (2008–2013), he was nominated on four occasions—along with his co-stars—for the Screen Actors Guild Award for Outstanding Ensemble. Between 2009 and 2012, Harrington played the recurring role of Jack Bass, an evil businessman, on the CW's Gossip Girl.

In March 2012, Harrington guest-starred in the season three premiere of the neo-Western drama series Justified, playing Fletcher "the Ice Pick" Nix. In his review of the episode for Entertainment Weekly, Ken Tucker commented, "In a very nice performance utterly unlike anything he does on Dexter, Harrington let his hair get all bed-heady and spoke in a mumble-mouth drawl as he set up his favorite sadistic game: He lays a gun on a table, and has someone count down from 10. At "1," you're invited to reach for the gun, but that's when Ice Pick earns his nickname: He pulls out an ice pick, stabs your hand to the table, picks up the gun, and shoots you". Next, Harrington featured in a small but pivotal role in Christopher Nolan's The Dark Knight Rises (2012), co-starred as Alan Shepard—the first American astronaut to travel to space—in the CBS miniseries The Astronaut Wives Club (2015), and appeared as Jack, a lecherous photographer, in Nicolas Winding Refn's critically divisive arthouse thriller, The Neon Demon (2016).

On the sixth season of Elementary (2018), a contemporary spin on Sherlock Holmes, Harrington played Michael Rowan, a serial killer struggling with sobriety. His next role was Louis Freeh, former head of the FBI, on the second season of Spectrum's Manhunt (2020).

== Filmography ==
=== Film ===
Year	Title	Role	Notes
1999	The Messenger: The Story of Joan of Arc	Aulon	
2000	Boiler Room	JT Marlin Trainee	Uncredited
2000	Massholes	Bing	
2000	Drop Back Ten	Spanks Voley	
2001	Riding in Cars with Boys	Bobby	
2001	The Hole	Mike Steel	
2001	My First Mister	Randy Harris Jr.	
2002	Life Makes Sense If You're Famous	Jay	
2002	Ghost Ship	Jack Ferriman	
2002	We Were Soldiers	Spec. 4 Bill Beck	
2003	Wrong Turn	Chris Flynn	
2003	Love Object	Kenneth Winslow	
2004	Three Way	Ralph Hagen	
2006	Taphephobia	Mike Hollister	
2006	Bottoms Up	Rusty #1	
2007	Fort Pit	Mike Sokeletski	
2008	Exit Speed	Sam Cutter	
2009	Timer	Dan the Man	
2009	Life Is Hot in Cracktown	Benny	
2009	Not Since You	Sam Nelson	
2012	The Dark Knight Rises	Uniform	
2016	The Neon Demon	Jack McCarther	

=== Television ===
Year	Title	Role	Notes
2002	Taken	Jesse Keys – Adult	3 episodes
2003–2004	L.A. Dragnet	Det. Jimmy McCarron / Det. Dexter McCarron	Main cast (Season 2)
2006	Law & Order: Criminal Intent	Tim Rainey	Episode: "Vacancy"
2006	Kidnapped	Kenneth Cantrell	Episode: "Special Delivery"
2006–2007	Sons & Daughters	Wylie Blake	9 episodes
2007	Rescue Me	Troy Vollie	Recurring (season 4)
2008–2013	Dexter	Det. Joseph "Joey" Quinn	Recurring (season 3); main cast (seasons 4–8)
2009–2012	Gossip Girl	Jack Bass	Recurring (seasons 2–3, 5); guest (seasons 4, 6)
2012	Justified	Fletcher 'The Ice Pick' Nix	Episode: "The Gunfighter"
2014	Those Who Kill	Det. Nico Bronte	3 episodes
2015	The Astronaut Wives Club	Alan Shepard	10 episodes
2015	Limitless	Agent Casey Rooks	3 episodes
2016–2017	Shooter	Lon Scott	Recurring (season 1)
2017–2018	Sneaky Pete	Joe	Recurring (seasons 1–2)
2017	Brooklyn Nine-Nine	Officer Maldack	Episode: "Moo Moo"
2018	Elementary	Michael Rowan	Main cast (season 6)
2020	Manhunt	FBI Head Louis Freeh	Recurring (season 2)
2025–present	Dexter: Resurrection	Lieut. Joseph "Joey" Quinn	Guest (season 1); main cast (season 2); 7 episodes

== Accolades ==
Year	Association	Category	Nominated work	Result
2004	Málaga Fantastic Film Festival	Best Actor	Love Object	Won
2005	Fangoria Chainsaw Awards	Best Actor	Love Object	Nominated
2009	Screen Actors Guild Awards	Outstanding Performance by an Ensemble in a Drama Series	Dexter	Nominated
2010	Screen Actors Guild Awards	Outstanding Performance by an Ensemble in a Drama Series	Dexter	Nominated
2011	Screen Actors Guild Awards	Outstanding Performance by an Ensemble in a Drama Series	Dexter	Nominated
2012	Screen Actors Guild Awards	Outstanding Performance by an Ensemble in a Drama Series	Dexter	Nominated
