= François Barrois =

French Scientific Instrument Manufacturer

François Barrois (16th century) was a French scientific instrument maker.

Provost of Vaucouleurs (Lorraine), François Barrois was active in the second half of the sixteenth century. He wrote a treatise entirely dedicated to the description of his compass, specifically developed for surveying: La Fabrique et ... la pratique du Compas Barrois ... (Paris, 1598).
