= Joan of Arc (1948 film) =

1948 film by Victor Fleming

- Theatrical release poster
- Directed by: Victor Fleming
- Screenplay by: Maxwell Anderson; Andrew Solt
- Based on: Joan of Lorraine by Maxwell Anderson
- Produced by: Walter Wanger
- Starring: Ingrid Bergman
- Cinematography: Joseph Valentine
- Edited by: Frank Sullivan
- Music by: Hugo Friedhofer
- Color process: Technicolor
- Production company: Sierra Pictures
- Distributed by: RKO Radio Pictures
- Release dates: November 11, 1948 (New York City); September 2, 1950 (United States)
- Running time: 145 minutes
- Country: United States
- Language: English
- Budget: $4.6 million
- Box office: $6 million (rentals)

Joan of Arc is a 1948 American epic historical drama film directed by Victor Fleming, and starring Ingrid Bergman as the eponymous French religious icon and war heroine. It was produced by Walter Wanger and is based on Maxwell Anderson's successful Broadway play Joan of Lorraine, which also starred Bergman, and was adapted for the screen by Anderson himself, in collaboration with Andrew Solt. It is the last film Fleming directed before his death in 1949.

== Plot ==
In 15th-century France, the young peasant Joan, at the age of thirteen, begins to hear voices that she believes are sent by God. The voices instruct her to help save France from English occupation and to ensure that the Dauphin, Charles, is crowned the rightful king. When she is seventeen, Joan arrives before Sir Robert de Baudricourt, the military commander of Vaucouleurs, and asks to be provided an escort to meet the Dauphin in Chinon. Sir Robert dismisses her request while Jean de Metz, a knight, tells Joan about a prophecy that an armored maiden from Lorraine will lead France's armies.

In March 1429, after the French have lost another battle, Sir Robert allows De Metz and Bertrand de Poulengy, a squire, to escort Joan. Upon her arrival at Charles's royal court, Joan identifies the disguised Dauphin within the crowd. Convinced of her sincerity, Charles gives Joan command of France's armies despite the skepticism of his advisors. Joan next persuades Charles to accompany her and the French to Orléans.

At the military camp, Joan instructs the soldiers to cease their gambling, drinking, swearing and using the Lord's name in vain. She also sends away camp followers and prostitutes, and has the troops go to confession and attend Mass regularly before battle. Outside the fort of Les Tourelles, clad in armor and waving a banner, Joan warns English commander William Glasdale to retreat to Britain. Glasdale refuses and accuses Joan of sorcery. Joan leads the French on a siege of Orléans, though the French retreat after Joan is severely wounded in the shoulder. The next day, after Joan recovers, she leads the French to a successful siege, where Glasdale is killed in battle.

Emboldened by the victory at Orléans, Joan leads the French to more military victories, allowing Charles to be crowned King of France in Reims. As Joan prepares to march on Paris, Charles signs a truce with Philip the Good, Duke of Burgundy. He then assumes command of the French army, whereby Joan loses influence within Charles's court.

In May 1430, while defending Compiègne, Joan is captured and sold to the English. She is imprisoned and transferred to Rouen for trial on charges of heresy, presided over by Bishop Pierre Cauchon. As the Bishop interrogates her, Joan explains and defends her divine mandate, and denounces the English. Despite Cauchon's request for her to recant, Joan steadily refuses, even under threat of torture, and unsuccessfully appeals to be tried before the Church.

After she has been formally admonished, Joan is taken out to the churchyard, where Cauchon reads Joan's sentence. Under immense pressure, Joan submits and signs an abjuration document, thereby agreeing to not wear men's clothing. However, Joan breaks the agreement while imprisoned and is condemned as a relapsed heretic. On May 30, 1431, Joan is executed by burning at the stake.

== Cast ==
At Domrémy, Joan's Birthplace in Lorraine, December 1428

- Ingrid Bergman as Jeanne d'Arc
- Selena Royle as Isabelle d'Arc, her mother
- Robert Barrat as Jacques d'Arc, her father
- James Lydon as Pierre d'Arc, her younger brother
- Rand Brooks as Jean d'Arc, her older brother
- Roman Bohnen as Durand Laxart, her uncle

At Vaucouleurs, February 1429

- Irene Rich as Catherine le Royer, her friend
- Nestor Paiva as Henri le Royer, Catherine's husband
- Richard Derr as Jean de Metz, a knight
- Ray Teal as Bertrand de Poulengy, a squire
- David Bond as Jean Fournier, priest of Vaucouleurs
- George Zucco as Constable of Clervaux
- George Coulouris as Sir Robert de Baudricourt, Governor of Vaucouleurs

The Court of Charles VII at Chinon, March 1429

- John Emery as Jean, Duke d'Alençon, cousin of Charles
- Gene Lockhart as Georges de la Trémoille, the Dauphin's chief counselor
- Nicholas Joy as Regnault de Chartres, Archbishop of Rheims and Chancellor of France
- Richard Ney as Charles de Bourbon, Duke de Clermont
- Vincent Donohue as Alain Chartier, court poet
- José Ferrer as The Dauphin, Charles VII, later King of France

The Army at the Battle of Orléans, May 1429

- Leif Erickson as Dunois, Bastard of Orleans
- John Ireland as Jean de la Boussac (St. Severe), a Captain
- Henry Brandon as Gilles de Rais, a Captain
- Morris Ankrum as Poton de Xaintrailles, a Captain
- Thomas Browne Henry as Raoul de Gaucourt, a Captain (credited as Tom Brown Henry)
- Gregg Barton as Louis d'Culan, a Captain
- Ethan Laidlaw as Jean d'Aulon, her squire
- Hurd Hatfield as Father Pasquerel, her Chaplain
- Ward Bond as La Hire, a Captain

The Enemy

- Frederick Worlock as John of Lancaster, Duke of Bedford, England's Regent
- Dennis Hoey as Sir William Glasdale
- Colin Keith-Johnston as Philip the Good, Duke of Burgundy
- Mary Currier as Jeane, Countess of Luxembourg
- Ray Roberts as Lionel of Wandomme, a Burgundian Captain
- J. Carrol Naish as John, Count of Luxembourg, her Captor

The Trial at Rouen, February 21 to May 30, 1431

- Francis L. Sullivan as Bishop Pierre Cauchon of Beauvais, the trial conductor
- Shepperd Strudwick as Father Jean Massieu, her Bailiff
- Taylor Holmes as the Bishop of Avranches
- Alan Napier as Earl of Warwick
- Philip Bourneuf as Jean d'Estivet, a Prosecutor
- Aubrey Mather as Jean de La Fontaine
- Herbert Rudley as Thomas de Courcelles, a Prosecutor
- Frank Puglia as Nicolas de Houppeville, a Judge
- William Conrad as Guillaume Erard, a Prosecutor
- John Parrish as Jean Beaupere, a Judge
- Victor Wood as Nicolas Midi, a Judge
- Houseley Stevenson as The Cardinal of Winchester
- Jeff Corey as her Prison Guard
- Bill Kennedy as Thierache, her Executioner
- Cecil Kellaway as Jean Le Maistre, Inquisitor of Rouen
- Louis Payne as Judge Thibault

Uncredited

- Richard Alexander as Man on Boulevard
- Herbert Rawlinson as Judge Marguerie
- Russell Simpson as Old Man with Pipe
- Vernon Steele as Boy's Father

== Production ==
=== Development ===
In 1946, Ingrid Bergman appeared in Maxwell Anderson's play Joan of Lorraine. Her performance received acclaim from theatre critics, which led to her win for a Tony Award for Best Actress in a Play. Bergman, Victor Fleming, and producer Walter Wanger formed an independent production company, EN Productions (the word means "one" in Swedish), which was later rebranded Sierra Pictures. Wanger had envisioned a film adaptation of the novel The Ballad and the Source with Bergman, but Fleming argued in favor of a biopic of Joan of Arc.

Principal photography began on September 16, 1947, at the Hal Roach Studios, with location scenes shot in the Los Angeles area. Filming ended on December 18, with Fleming directing nine days of reshoots.

=== Casting ===
Bergman and co-star José Ferrer (making his first film appearance and playing the Dauphin) received Academy Award nominations for their performances. The film was director Victor Fleming's last project—he died only two months after its release.

In Michael Sragow's 2008 biography of the director, he claims that Fleming, who was, according to Sragrow, romantically involved with Ingrid Bergman at the time, was deeply unhappy with the finished product, and even wept upon seeing it for the first time. Sragrow speculates that the disappointment of the failed relationship and the failure of the film may have led to Fleming's fatal heart attack, but there is no real evidence to support this. While contemporary critics may have agreed with Fleming's assessment of Joan of Arc, more recent reviewers of the restored complete version on DVD have not.

== Release ==
=== Original release ===
The movie was first released on November 11, 1948 by RKO. When the film was shortened for its general release on September 2, 1950 with 45 minutes being cut out; it was distributed, not by RKO, but by a company called Balboa Film Distributors, the same company which re-released Alfred Hitchcock's Under Capricorn, also starring Ingrid Bergman.

=== Restoration ===
The complete 145 minute version of Joan of Arc remained unseen in the U.S. for about 49 years. Although the complete Technicolor negatives remained in storage in Hollywood, the original soundtrack was thought to be lost. The movie was restored in 1998 after an uncut print in mint condition was found in Europe, containing the only known copy of the complete soundtrack. When it finally appeared on DVD, the restored complete version was hailed by online movie critics as being much superior to the edited version. It was released on DVD in 2004.

The edited version received its first television showing on the evening of April 12, 1968 (an Easter weekend), and has been shown on Ted Turner's WTCG and on cable several times. The full-length version was shown on Turner Classic Movies on March 13, 2011. This marked the first time that the complete unedited version had ever been shown on American television.

=== Differences in versions ===
There are several differences between the full-length roadshow version of the film and the edited general release version.

- One that is immediately noticeable is that there is actually a snippet from Joan's trial during the opening narration in the edited version, whereas in the full-length version, the events of Joan's life are shown in chronological order. The narration is more detailed in the edited version than in the complete version, with much of it used to cover the breaks in continuity caused by the severe editing.
- The edited version omits crucial scenes that are important to a psychological understanding of the narrative, such as the mention of a dream that Joan's father has which foretells of Joan's campaign against the English. When Joan hears of the dream, she becomes convinced that she has been divinely ordered to drive the English out of France.
- Most of the first ten minutes of the film, a section showing Joan praying in the Domrémy shrine, followed by a family dinner and conversation which leads to the mention of the dream, are not in the edited version.
- In the complete 145-minute version, the narration is heard only at the beginning of the film, and there are no sudden breaks in continuity.
- Entire characters, such as Joan's father (played by Robert Barrat) and Father Pasquerel (played by Hurd Hatfield) are partially or totally omitted from the edited version.
- Even the opening credits are somewhat different, and run about two minutes longer. In the edited version, the story begins after Victor Fleming's director's credit, and in the full-length version, after the director's credit, a title card states "The Players" appears onscreen, after which all the major lead and supporting actors, as well as the characters that they play, are listed in order of appearance and in groups (e.g., "At Domrémy", "At Chinon", etc.), much like Fleming's other lengthy film epic Gone with the Wind. More than 30 of the actors are listed.

The edited version might be considered more cinematic through its use of maps and voice-over narration to explain the political situation in France. (In the full-length version, Joan's family discusses the political situation during dinner.) The full-length version, although not presented as a play-within-a-play, as the stage version was, nevertheless resembles a stage-to-film adaptation, makes great use of Maxwell Anderson's original dialogue, and may seem, to some, stagy in its method of presentation, despite having a realistic depiction of the Siege of Orléans.

== Reception ==
=== Critical reaction ===
Joan of Arc received critical praise for its production values and Ingrid Bergman's performance, though some felt Joan of Arc's characterization was lacking. Bosley Crowther of The New York Times called Joan of Arc "one of the most magnificent films ever made, bespeaking the vast sum of money and the effort expended on it. Dramatically, it has moments of tremendous excitement and shock. And emotionally it has glimmers of the deep poignancy of the Maid. But, somehow, the huge combination of pageantry, legend and pathos—of spectacle, color, court intrigues and the historic ordeal of a girl—while honestly intended, fails to come fully to life or to give a profound comprehension of the torment and triumph of Joan."

Abel Green of Variety praised Bergman's performance and wrote "Joan of Arc is a big picture in every respect. It has size, color, pageantry, a bold historic bas-relief done up in the best 1948 Hollywood tradition. It has authority, conviction, an appeal to faith and a dedication to a cause that leaves little wanting." Harrison's Reports applauded the film as "a great spectacle, a truly superb feature that deserves to take its place as one of the finest ever produced in the history of the motion picture industry. Exquisitely photographed in Technicolor, the production is impressive and magnificent, and its combination of spectacularity, devout faith, and high courage has been handled with infinite care by both Walter Wanger, the producer, and Victor Fleming, the director." Kate Cameron of the New York Daily News wrote: "It is beautifully photographed in Technicolor and contains an inspirational performance by its star Ingrid Bergman, who also played Joan on the New York stage in the American play."

John McCarten of The New Yorker wrote the film "is overburdened with scenery, employs a cast that must run into thousands, and never departs from its fifteenth-century locale ... The sets are glaringly unnatural, and I guess the camerawork could be best described as curdled." Time magazine opened their review, stating, "Joan of Arc gives Ingrid Bergman the biggest role in her career. She almost fills it. If the rest of the movie were up to Miss Bergman, it could be rated very close to excellent. As it is, it rates A for effort."

Jack D. Grant of the Los Angeles Mirror was mixed on Bergman's performance, writing, "she had missed the true heart of the Maid ... Perhaps she approached it too reverently to breathe life into her interpretation. Her performance remains cold with the single startling exception of the womanly tears with which she meets triumph in battle." In the 2009 edition of his Movie Guide, Leonard Maltin—who had not reviewed the full-length version—wrote "Ingrid Bergman is staunchly sincere in this overlong, faithful adaptation of Maxwell Anderson's play. Not enough spectacle to balance the talky sequences".

On the review aggregator website Rotten Tomatoes, 82% of 11 critics' reviews are positive, with an average rating of 6.5/10.

=== Box office ===
According to RKO records, Joan of Arc earned $2,525,000 in theater rentals from the United States and Canada and $3,500,000 elsewhere. However, because of its expensive production costs, it recorded a loss of $2,480,436. In his biography of Bergman, Donald Spoto wrote "the critics' denunciations notwithstanding, the film earned back its investment with a sturdy profit".

=== Academy Award wins and nominations ===
Award	Nominee(s)	Result
Best Actress	Ingrid Bergman	Nominated
Best Supporting Actor	José Ferrer	Nominated
Best Art Direction-Set Decoration (color)	Richard Day, Edwin Casey Roberts, Joseph Kish	Nominated
Best Cinematography (color)	Joseph Valentine, William V. Skall, Winton C. Hoch	Won
Best Costume Design (color)	Barbara Karinska, Dorothy Jeakins	Won
Best Film Editing	Frank Sullivan	Nominated
Best Score, Dramatic or Comedy Picture	Hugo Friedhofer	Nominated
Honorary Award*	Walter Wanger	Won
*"for distinguished service to the industry in adding to its moral stature in the world community by his production of the picture Joan of Arc." (Wanger refused the award in protest of the film's absence in the Best Picture category.)

== In other media ==
=== Comic book ===
- Magazine Enterprises: Joan of Arc (1949)

== See also ==
- The Passion of Joan of Arc, an earlier 1928 film by Carl Theodor Dreyer
- Cultural depictions of Joan of Arc
- List of historical drama films

== Bibliography ==
- Bernstein, Matthew (2000) [1994]. Walter Wanger, Hollywood Independent. University of Minnesota Press. ISBN 978-0-816-63548-1.
- Leamer, Laurence (1986). As Time Goes By: The Life of Ingrid Bergman. New York: Harper & Row. ISBN 0-06-015485-3.
- Segaloff, Nat (2013). Final Cuts: The Last Films of 50 Great Directors. Bear Manor Media. ISBN 978-1-593-93233-6.
- Spoto, Donald (1998). Notorious: The Life Of Ingrid Bergman. New York: Da Capo Press. ISBN 978-0-006-38813-5.
- Sragow, Michael (2008). Victor Fleming: An American Movie Master. New York: Pantheon. ISBN 978-0-375-40748-2.
