= Love object =

A love object is an object of love; see Love and Object relations theory.

Love object may also refer to:

- Object sexuality, where the love object is inanimate
- Love Object, a 2003 horror film
- The Love Object, a book by Edna O'Brien
