= Bertrand de Poulengy =

Bertrand de Poulengy (born c. 1392) was a French nobleman who is best known for his association with Joan of Arc during the Hundred Years' War.

== Biography ==
Very little is known about de Poulengy's life. He is believed to have been born sometime around 1392 in Champagne, but the exact circumstances of his birth are unclear. His father, Jean de Poulengy, was ennobled in 1425.

De Poulengy was serving under Robert de Baudricourt in Vaucouleurs when Joan of Arc began demanding an audience with the King of France, Charles VII. Joan earned the support of de Poulengy and a knight named Jean de Metz, but de Baudricourt initially refused to help her. In February 1429, when Joan correctly predicted the outcome of the Battle of Rouvray, de Baudricourt relented and agreed to give Joan an escort to accompany her on her journey to meet the king. De Poulengy and de Metz disguised Joan as a male soldier and took her to Chinon, where the king was residing. De Poulengy possibly accompanied Joan throughout her brief military career.

It is mostly unknown what became of de Poulengy after Joan was captured by Burgundians in 1430. He is known to have participated in the retrial of Joan in 1456, where he detailed his experiences with her. During the retrial, de Poulengy claimed to be about 63 years old. It is unclear when he died.

== In popular culture ==
De Poulengy was portrayed by Cliff Saunders in the 1999 miniseries Joan Of Arc, and by Ray Teal in the 1948 film Joan Of Arc. He also appeared as a character in the video games Age of Empires II and Jeanne D'Arc. He is a character in Christie Golden's novel Assassin's Creed: Heresy, which is set in the universe of Assassin's Creed.
