= Ostreville =

- Commune
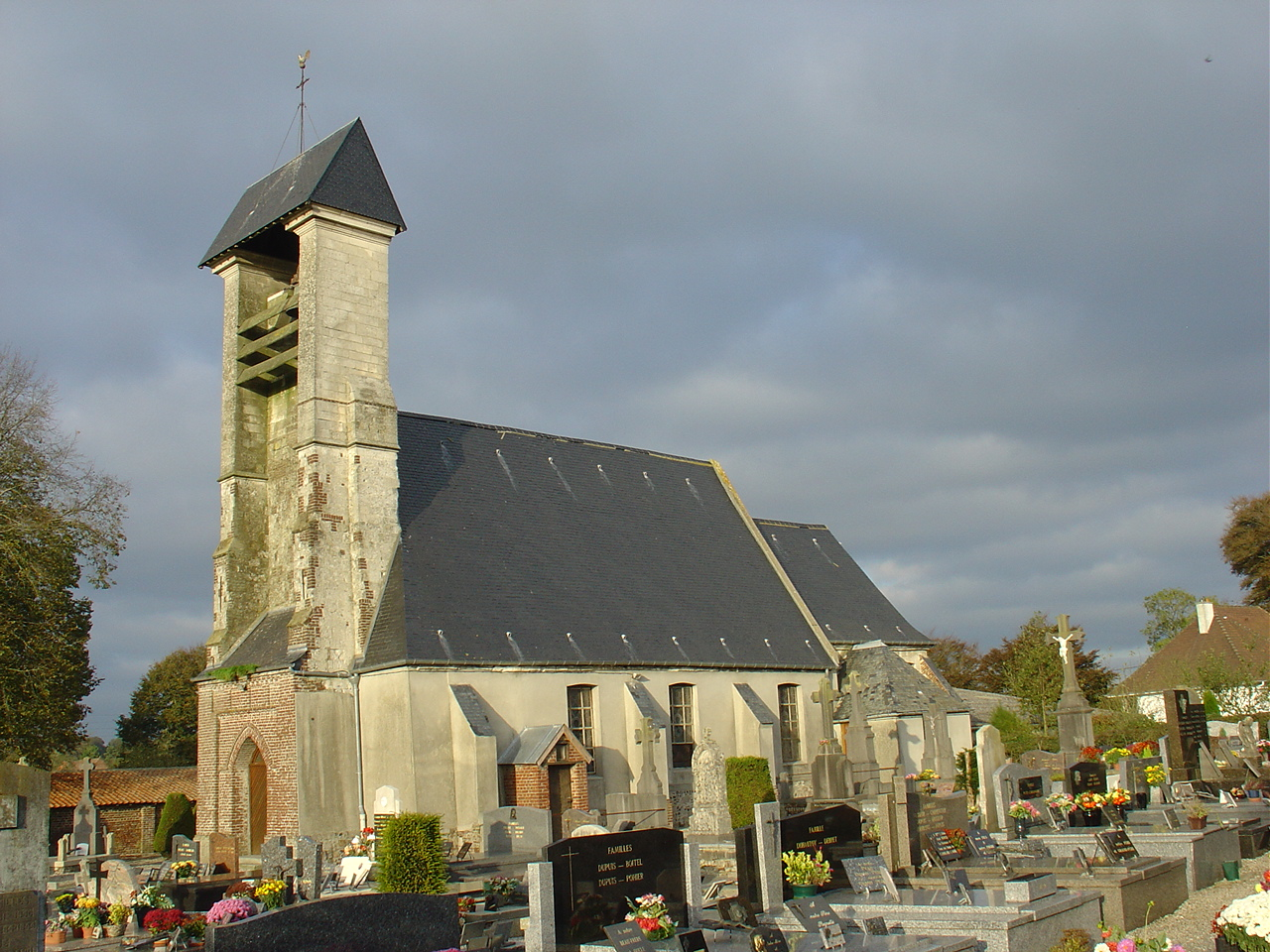
- The church of Ostreville

- Coat of arms
- Location of Ostreville
- Location within France Location within Hauts-de-France
- Coordinates: 50°23′51″N 2°23′41″E
- Country: France
- Region: Hauts-de-France
- Department: Pas-de-Calais
- Arrondissement: Arras
- Canton: Saint-Pol-sur-Ternoise
- Intercommunality: CC Ternois

Government
  - Mayor (2020–2026): Christophe Monchy
- Area^{1}: 3.88 km^{2} (1.50 sq mi)
- Elevation: 150 m (490 ft)
- Highest elevation: 161 m (528 ft)
- Lowest elevation: 115 m (377 ft)
- Population (2023): 227
  - Density: 58.5/km^{2} (152/sq mi)
- Time zone: UTC+01:00 (CET)
  - Summer (DST): UTC+02:00 (CEST)
- INSEE/Postal code: 62641 /62130
- ^{1} French Land Register data, which excludes lakes, ponds, glaciers > 1 km^{2} (0.386 sq mi or 247 acres) and river estuaries.

Ostreville (French pronunciation: [ɔstʁəvil]) is a commune in the Pas-de-Calais department in the Hauts-de-France region of France 22 miles (35 km) northwest of Arras.

== Heraldry ==
Arms of Ostreville	The arms of Ostreville are blazoned : Azure, an inescutcheon argent. (Gouzeaucourt, Saint-Jean-de-Vals, Ramburelles, Saint-Menge, Colombey-les-Belles and Ostreville use the same arms.)

== Population ==
Historical population
Year	Pop.	±% p.a.
1968	244	—
1975	241	−0.18%
1982	249	+0.47%
1990	265	+0.78%
1999	276	+0.45%
2007	266	−0.46%
2012	257	−0.69%
2017	239	−1.44%
2023	227	−0.85%
Source: INSEE

== See also ==
- Communes of the Pas-de-Calais department
