= Siege of Saint-Pierre-le-Moûtier =

1429 battle of the Armagnac–Burgundian Civil War

- Part of the Armagnac–Burgundian Civil War
Date	October – November 4, 1429
Location	Saint-Pierre-le-Moûtier, France 46.7917°N 3.1189°E
Result	French victory

Belligerents
France	Burgundians

Commanders and leaders
Joan of Arc; Charles d'Albret	Perrinet Gressard

The siege of Saint-Pierre-le-Moûtier was a venture of the so-called Lancastrian War. The small town was, however, heavily fortified and surrounded by a deep moat. According to Joan of Arc's bodyguard, Jean d'Aulon, the initial assault failed and the retreat was sounded. Joan managed to initiate a second assault, which, according to d'Aulon, was met 'without much resistance'. d'Aulon had been wounded in the heel during the initial assault and was, therefore, probably mounted on his horse during the second assault.

As the aim to take all enemy strongholds on the Loire banks was put forward, the besieging of Saint-Pierre-le-Moûtier was adopted. Joan and Charles d'Albret united the forces at Bourges and proceeded to Saint-Pierre-le-Moutier. The defenders put up a vigorous defence. Nonetheless, the town was eventually taken by assault on November 4, 1429. When the town was captured, Charles VII bestowed on Joan noble status. On August 24, 1902, a statue of Joan of Arc was unveiled in the city.

== See also ==
- Siege of La Charité
