= Colombey-les-Belles =

- Commune
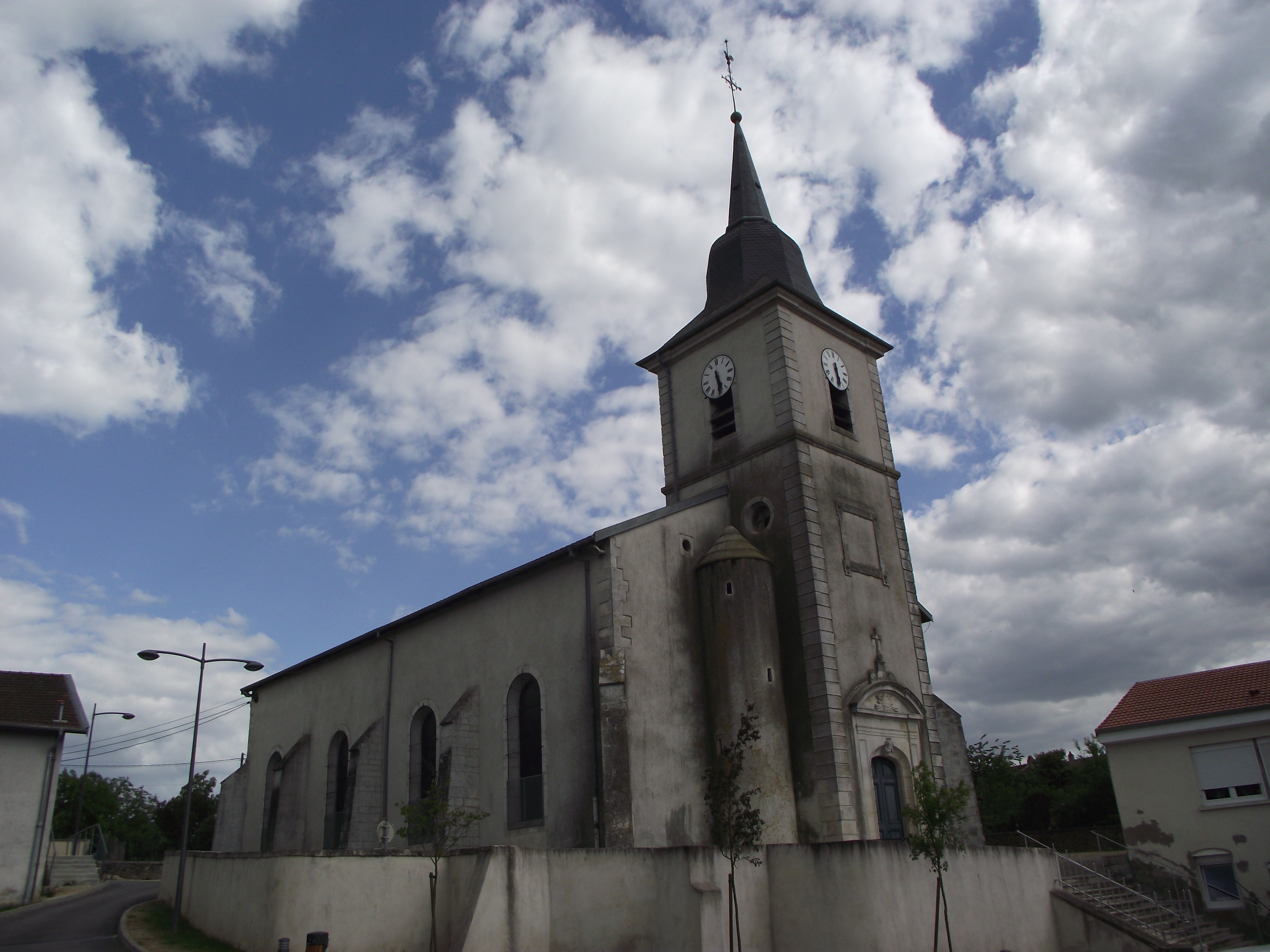
- The church in Colombey-les-Belles

- Coat of arms
- Location of Colombey-les-Belles
- Location within France Location within Grand Est
- Coordinates: 48°31′42″N 5°53′53″E
- Country: France
- Region: Grand Est
- Department: Meurthe-et-Moselle
- Arrondissement: Toul
- Canton: Meine au Saintois
- Intercommunality: CC Pays de Colombey et Sud Toulois

Government
  - Mayor (2020–2026): Benjamin Voinot
- Area^{1}: 17.59 km^{2} (6.79 sq mi)
- Elevation: 327 m (1,073 ft)
- Highest elevation: 406 m (1,332 ft)
- Lowest elevation: 282 m (925 ft)
- Population (2023): 1,416
  - Density: 80.50/km^{2} (208.5/sq mi)
- Time zone: UTC+01:00 (CET)
  - Summer (DST): UTC+02:00 (CEST)
- INSEE/Postal code: 54135 /54170
- ^{1} French Land Register data, which excludes lakes, ponds, glaciers > 1 km^{2} (0.386 sq mi or 247 acres) and river estuaries.

Colombey-les-Belles (French pronunciation: [kɔlɔ̃bɛ le bɛl]) is a commune in the Meurthe-et-Moselle department in north-eastern France, 27 km south-west of Nancy. As at 2021, the population was 1,434.

== Heraldry ==
| Arms of Colombey-les-Belles | The arms of Colombey-les-Belles are blazoned : Azure, an inescutcheon argent. (Gouzeaucourt, Saint-Jean-de-Vals, Ramburelles, Saint-Menge, Colombey-les-Belles and Ostreville use the same arms.) |

== See also ==
- Communes of the Meurthe-et-Moselle department
