= Saint-Pierre-le-Moûtier =

- Commune
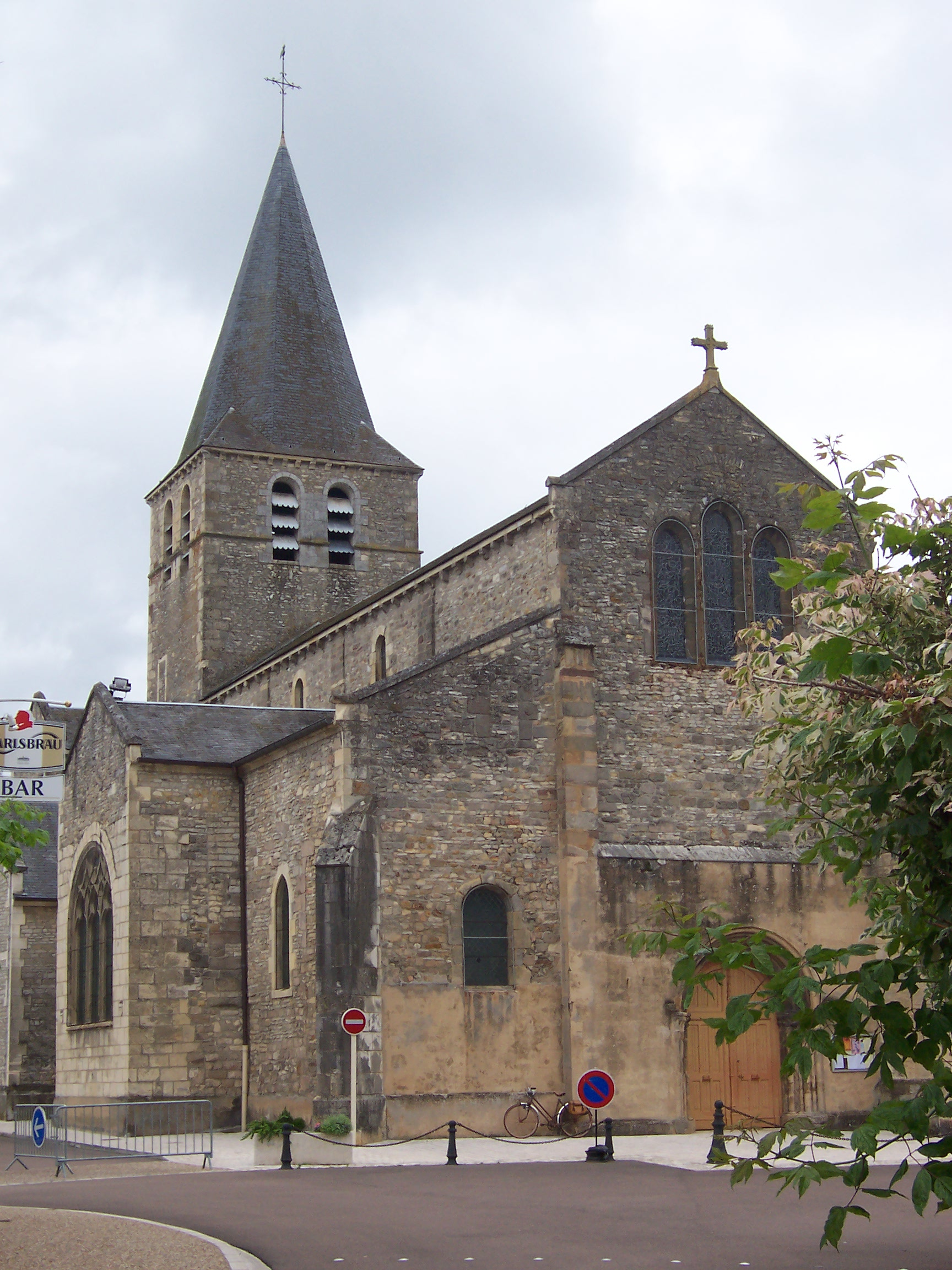
- The church in Saint-Pierre-le-Moûtier

- Coat of arms
- Location of Saint-Pierre-le-Moûtier
- Location within France Location within Bourgogne-Franche-Comté
- Coordinates: 46°47′30″N 3°07′08″E
- Country: France
- Region: Bourgogne-Franche-Comté
- Department: Nièvre
- Arrondissement: Nevers
- Canton: Saint-Pierre-le-Moûtier
- Intercommunality: Nivernais Bourbonnais

Government
  - Mayor (2020–2026): Pierre Billard
- Area^{1}: 47.67 km^{2} (18.41 sq mi)
- Highest elevation: 264 m (866 ft)
- Lowest elevation: 188 m (617 ft)
- Population (2023): 1,823
  - Density: 38.24/km^{2} (99.05/sq mi)
- Time zone: UTC+01:00 (CET)
  - Summer (DST): UTC+02:00 (CEST)
- INSEE/Postal code: 58264 /58240
- ^{1} French Land Register data, which excludes lakes, ponds, glaciers > 1 km^{2} (0.386 sq mi or 247 acres) and river estuaries.

Saint-Pierre-le-Moûtier (French pronunciation: [sɛ̃ pjɛʁ lə mutje]) is a commune in the Nièvre department in central France. It was besieged during the Hundred Years' War.

Located between the Loire and Allier, the town has a rich and powerful history, but is a little forgotten today because of its "relative" road isolation and lack of tourist infrastructure. Saint-Pierre-le-Moûtier is close to Magny-Cours and its racing circuit which hosted the Grand Prix de France Formula 1 from 1991 to 2008.

== History ==
On November 4, 1422, the bailiwick of Saint-Pierre rendered a sentence, compelling the inhabitants of the land of Poussery at the end of Montaron to ensure the lookout and guard at the castle Poussery, as requested by the lord of the place: Gaucher Courvol. This bailiwick rendered to the son of the latter, Philibert de Courvol, another sentence on 25 March 1451, authorizing him to pass the Ruaux stream in his meadow of Chaulgy.

The city is stormed, then released by Joan of Arc on November 4, 1429.

It was chief town of district from 1790 to 1795.

During the revolutionary period of the National Convention (1792-1795), the municipality provisionally bore the names of Brutus-la-Vallée, Brutus-le-Magnanime and Brutus-le-Moutier.

== Population ==
Historical population
Year	Pop.	±% p.a.
1968	2,227	—
1975	2,250	+0.15%
1982	2,261	+0.07%
1990	2,091	−0.97%
1999	2,029	−0.33%
2007	1,988	−0.25%
2012	2,030	+0.42%
2017	1,956	−0.74%
2023	1,823	−1.17%
Source: INSEE

== See also ==
- Communes of the Nièvre department
