= Jean de Metz =

French nobleman known for his role in the exploits of Joan of Arc

Jean de Metz (also Jean de Nouillonpont) (born c. 1398) was a French nobleman who is known primarily for his role in the exploits of Joan of Arc.

== Biography ==
His alternative name derives from Nouillonpont, a village in the Meuse département then in the jurisdiction of Lorraine. According to Vita Sackville West's Saint Joan of Arc, he was "of relatively gentle birth", though his parents were not noble. He had been in trouble "for swearing a vilain servant and for flinging an award of money on the ground", but was otherwise an ordinary "man of the sword".

His acquaintance with Joan began when she arrived at the fortified city of Vaucouleurs in 1428. At the time, he was a squire in the service of Robert de Baudricourt. Their meeting included an exchange in which he asked her who her Lord was, to which she replied "God". De Metz provided her with men's clothing in order to further her desire to meet the King of France. It was the devotion of De Metz and his fellow soldier Bertrand de Poulengy that persuaded De Baudricourt to her cause.

De Metz effectively became "the leader of the little troop", Joan's escort to Chinon, where she met King Charles VII. After this point, Jean aided Joan's efforts by furnishing her a horse and necessary clothing. An aide to the King provided De Metz with some 425 livres for the expenses of "the Maid" and himself, including armor. Though there were suspicions of these men travelling with an unmarried woman, De Metz declared at her trial that though he, De Poulengy, and "la Pucelle" (Joan) slept side-by-side when they camped for the night, her garments were "closely shut", and he never felt any sexual desire for her, "by reason of the virtue I divined in her".

After Joan's execution, De Metz was not forgotten: in 1444, Charles VII granted him a title of nobility, in recognition of his services "in our wars and elsewhere".

Eleven years later, at Joan's nullification trial, De Metz was a witness, described as a nobleman in residence at Vaucouleurs.

== Alternative interpretations ==
According to Joan's Jesuit biographer, Jean-Baptiste Joseph Ayroles, the actions taken by De Metz (specifically his leaving her journey before she reached Nancy) may only make sense if he were "a kind of spy" sent, most likely at the behest of De Baudricourt, to determine Joan's "true or false worth". The argument hangs in part on the breach-of-promise action brought by Joan's father Jacques d'Arc. Sackville-West however finds this interpretation faulty on several practical grounds, although she offers nothing to counter this view of De Metz.

== Portrayals ==
In the 1948 film Joan of Arc (starring Ingrid Bergman) De Metz was played by Richard Derr. In the 1999 miniseries Joan of Arc, De Metz was portrayed by actor Chad Willett. In this telling, De Metz "gradually falls in love" with the saint, but never tells her of his feelings, remaining true to her even after her death.

De Metz is also a selectable player character in the 2004 videogame Wars and Warriors: Joan of Arc, a minor character in the 1999 videogame, Age of Empires II: The Age of Kings and a major character in the 2007 PSP game Jeanne d'Arc. Additionally, in Age of Empires: The Age of Kings for the Nintendo DS, he serves as the game's tutorial guide.

Jean de Metz appears in the book Assassin's Creed Heresy by Christie Golden, a book from Ubisoft's hit video game series. In the novel, he is a member of the French Brotherhood of Assassins.
