= Gouzeaucourt =

- Commune
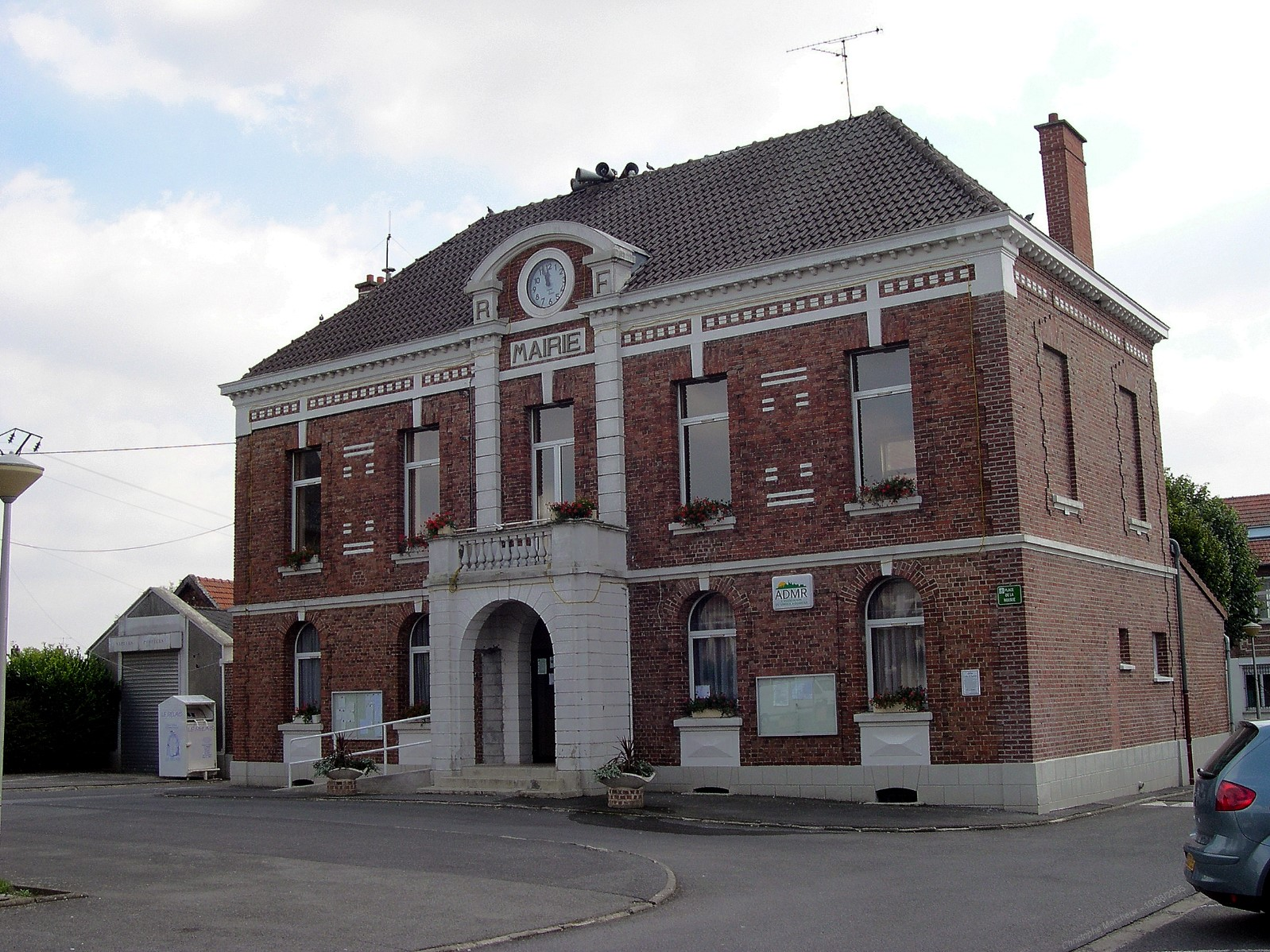
- The town hall in Gouzeaucourt

- Coat of arms
- Location of Gouzeaucourt
- Location within France Location within Hauts-de-France
- Coordinates: 50°03′23″N 3°07′30″E
- Country: France
- Region: Hauts-de-France
- Department: Nord
- Arrondissement: Cambrai
- Canton: Le Cateau-Cambrésis
- Intercommunality: CA Cambrai

Government
  - Mayor (2020–2026): Jacques Richard
- Area^{1}: 12.11 km^{2} (4.68 sq mi)
- Elevation: 118 m (387 ft)
- Highest elevation: 137 m (449 ft)
- Lowest elevation: 95 m (312 ft)
- Population (2023): 1,413
  - Density: 116.7/km^{2} (302.2/sq mi)
- Time zone: UTC+01:00 (CET)
  - Summer (DST): UTC+02:00 (CEST)
- INSEE/Postal code: 59269 /59231
- ^{1} French Land Register data, which excludes lakes, ponds, glaciers > 1 km^{2} (0.386 sq mi or 247 acres) and river estuaries.

Gouzeaucourt (French pronunciation: [ɡuzokuʁ]) is a commune in the Nord department in northern France. It was the scene of fierce fighting during World War I, and is mentioned in the poem "The Irish Guards" by Rudyard Kipling. 916 casualties from several nations are interred at the Gouzeaucourt New British Cemetery.

== Heraldry ==
Arms of Gouzeaucourt	The arms of Gouzeaucourt are blazoned : Azure, an inescutcheon argent. (Gouzeaucourt, Saint-Jean-de-Vals, Ramburelles, Saint-Menge, Colombey-les-Belles and Ostreville use the same arms.)

== See also ==
- Communes of the Nord department
