= Baudricourt =

- Commune
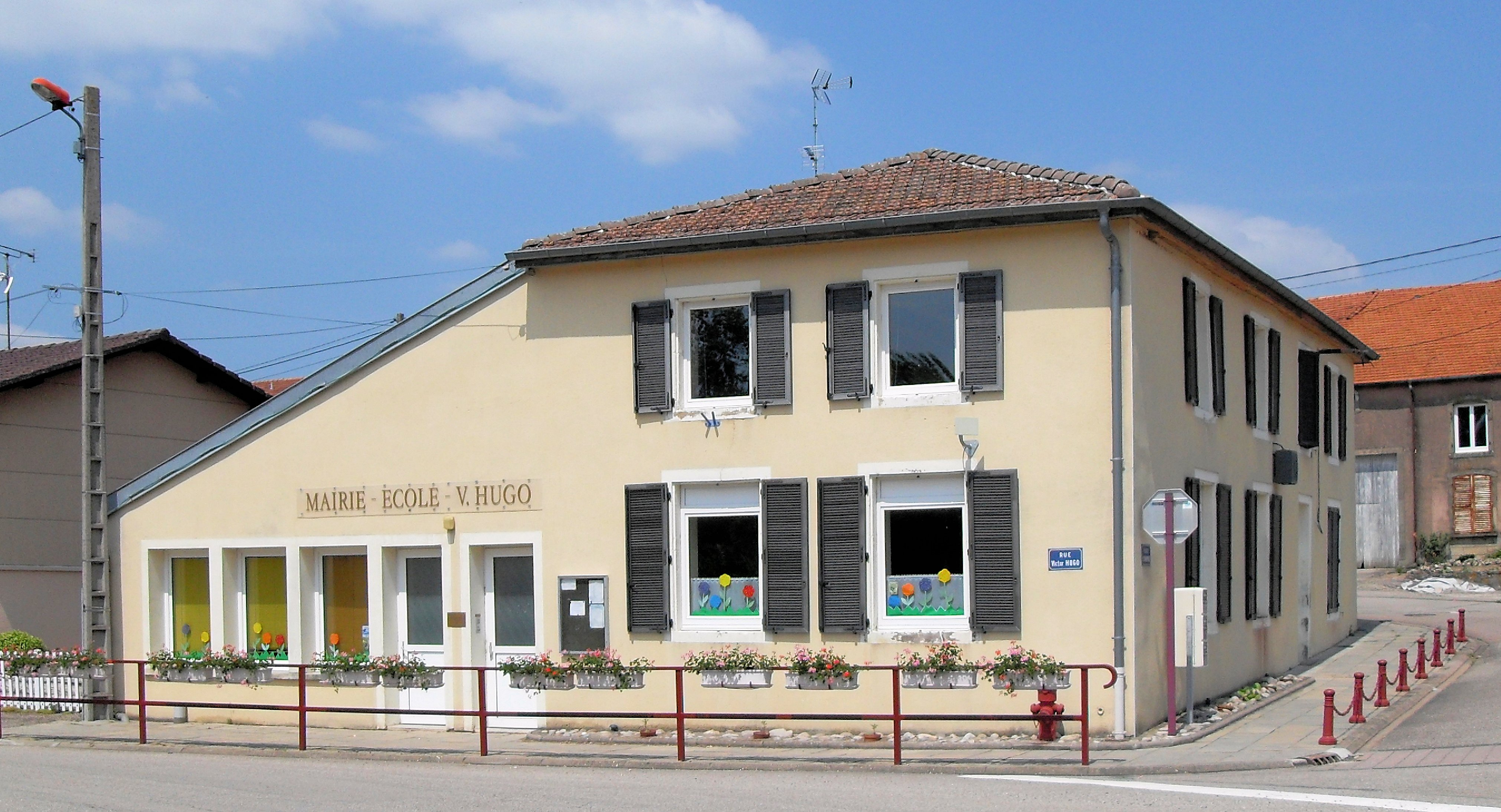
- The town hall and school in Baudricourt

- Coat of arms
- Location of Baudricourt
- Location within France Location within Grand Est
- Coordinates: 48°18′50″N 6°03′17″E
- Country: France
- Region: Grand Est
- Department: Vosges
- Arrondissement: Neufchâteau
- Canton: Mirecourt
- Intercommunality: CC Mirecourt Dompaire

Government
  - Mayor (2020–2026): Didier Cherrier
- Area^{1}: 3.48 km^{2} (1.34 sq mi)
- Elevation: 300 m (980 ft)
- Highest elevation: 378 m (1,240 ft)
- Lowest elevation: 291 m (955 ft)
- Population (2023): 327
  - Density: 94.0/km^{2} (243/sq mi)
- Time zone: UTC+01:00 (CET)
  - Summer (DST): UTC+02:00 (CEST)
- INSEE/Postal code: 88039 /88500
- ^{1} French Land Register data, which excludes lakes, ponds, glaciers > 1 km^{2} (0.386 sq mi or 247 acres) and river estuaries.

Baudricourt (French pronunciation: [bodʁikuʁ]) is a commune in the Vosges department in Grand Est in northeastern France.

Baudricourt is on the Cochon river, a left tributary of the Val d'Arol.

== History ==
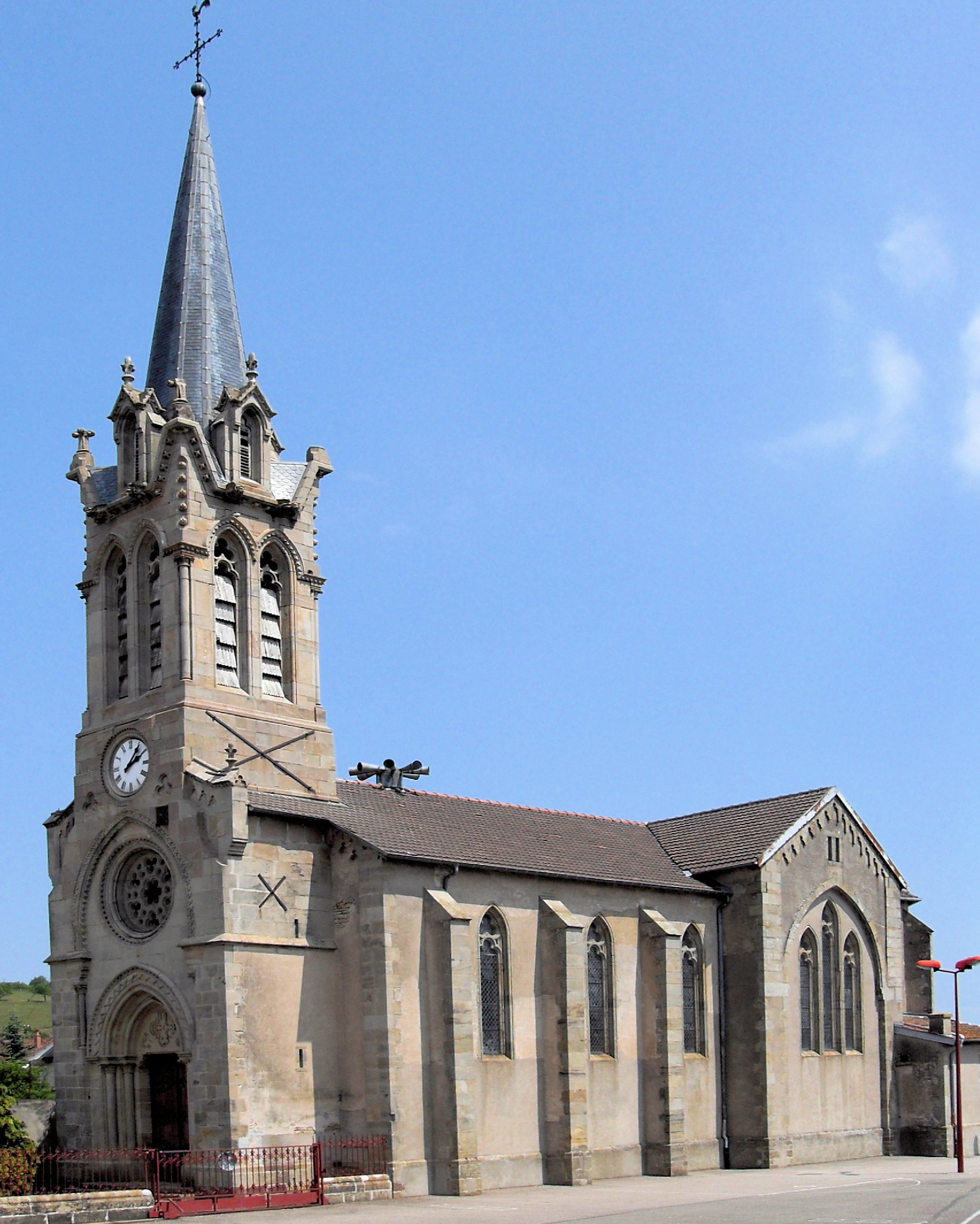
Baudricourt, Église Saint-Remy.

The name Baldrici curtis is attested as early as the 10th century. The erection of the marquisate of Baudricourt in 1719 changed the name of the village which was called Saint-Menge until 1766.

In July 1767 letters patent of Louis XV allowed that the name of Bassompierre be attributed to the seigniory of Baudricourt. Finally, (after the French Revolution the municipality takes again its current name in 1790.

Baudricourt belonged to the bailliage of Mirecourt. Its church, dedicated to Saint Remi, was in from the diocese of Toul, deanery of Porsas. The cure was at the collation of the chapter of Remiremont et au concours.

Baudricourt belonged to the canton of Rouvres-en-Xaintois from 1793 to 1801, then to the canton of Vittel until 1806, and finally, to that of Mirecourt as today.

== Population ==
Historical population
Year	Pop.	±% p.a.
1968	225	—
1975	172	−3.76%
1982	283	+7.37%
1990	317	+1.43%
1999	280	−1.37%
2007	310	+1.28%
2012	316	+0.38%
2017	328	+0.75%
2023	327	−0.05%
Source: INSEE

== Heraldry ==
Blason baudricourt.

A coat of arms with gold on a lion creeping with sand, armed, and crowned Gules.

This is the coat of arms of the lords of Baudricourt. When the old barony was erected as a marquisate in 1719, it took the name and arms (three chevrons Gules on field of silver) of the Bassompierre. Today, the commune has taken over the arms of its former lords

== Notable people ==
- Robert de Baudricourt, captain of Vaucouleurs and character of the epic of Joan of Arc
- Jean de Baudricourt, Marshal of France at the end of the 15th century.

== See also ==
- Communes of the Vosges department
