= Ramburelles =

- Commune
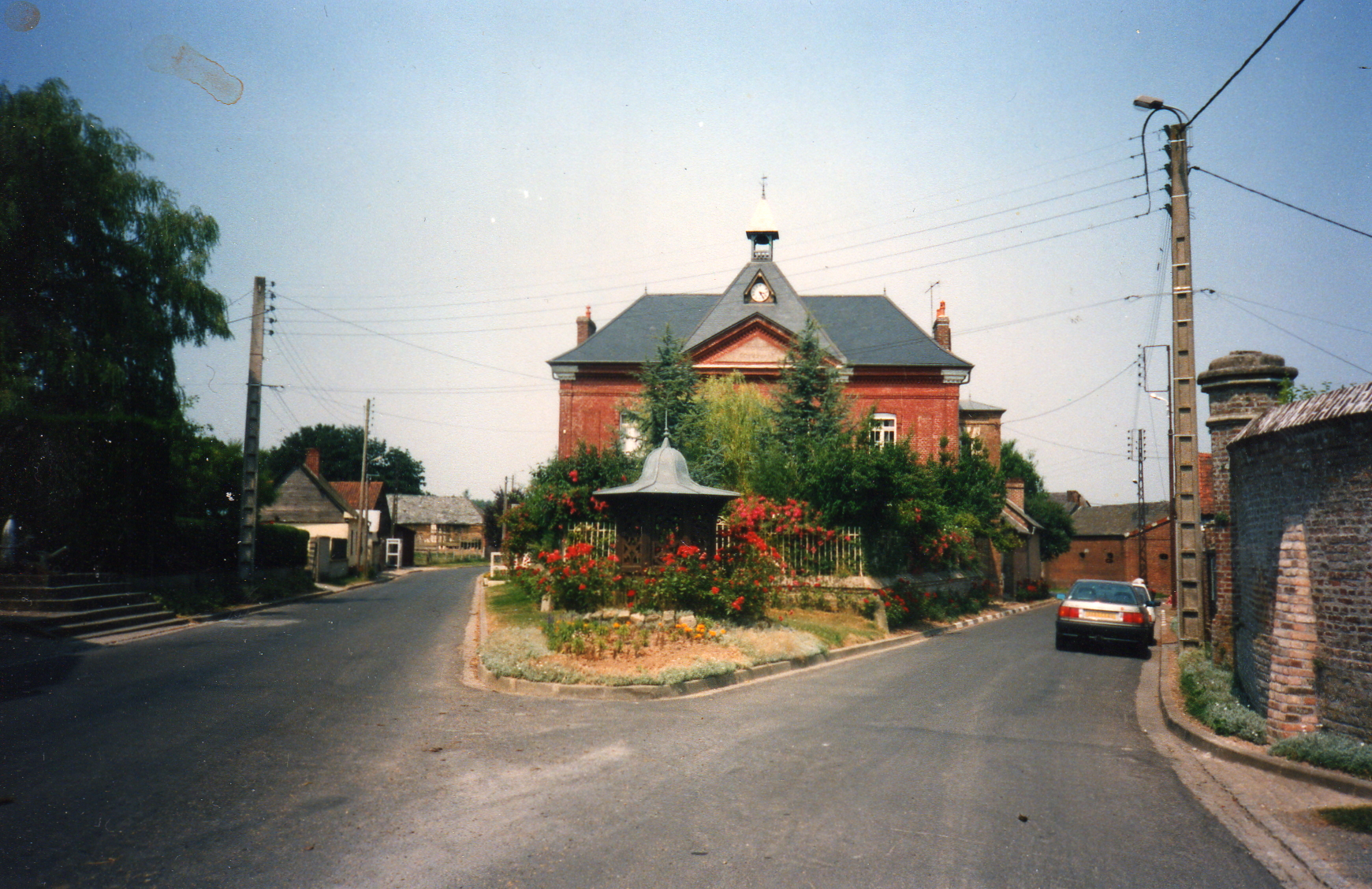
- The school in Ramburelles

- Coat of arms
- Location of Ramburelles
- Location within France Location within Hauts-de-France
- Coordinates: 49°58′05″N 1°42′38″E
- Country: France
- Region: Hauts-de-France
- Department: Somme
- Arrondissement: Abbeville
- Canton: Gamaches
- Intercommunality: CC Aumale - Blangy-sur-Bresle

Government
  - Mayor (2020–2026): Jack Bacouël
- Area^{1}: 4.59 km^{2} (1.77 sq mi)
- Elevation: 130 m (430 ft)
- Highest elevation: 133 m (436 ft)
- Lowest elevation: 104 m (341 ft)
- Population (2023): 262
  - Density: 57.1/km^{2} (148/sq mi)
- Time zone: UTC+01:00 (CET)
  - Summer (DST): UTC+02:00 (CEST)
- INSEE/Postal code: 80662 /80140
- ^{1} French Land Register data, which excludes lakes, ponds, glaciers > 1 km^{2} (0.386 sq mi or 247 acres) and river estuaries.

Ramburelles (French pronunciation: [ʁɑ̃byʁɛl]) is a commune in the Somme department in Hauts-de-France in northern France. Paul Eugène Delattre (1830–1898), lawyer, politician, writer and the essayist and historian Maurice Vaussard (1888–1978) were born in Ramburelles.

== Geography ==
Ramburelles is situated on the D263 road, some 10 miles (16 km) southwest of Abbeville.

== Population ==
Historical population

Year	Pop.	±% p.a.
1793	320	—
1821	393	+0.74%
1846	422	+0.29%
1872	362	−0.59%
1901	292	−0.74%
1926	222	−1.09%
1946	233	+0.24%
1962	226	−0.19%
1968	213	−0.98%

Year	Pop.	±% p.a.
1975	228	+0.98%
1982	211	−1.10%
1990	231	+1.14%
1999	210	−1.05%
2007	251	+2.25%
2012	255	+0.32%
2017	280	+1.89%
2023	262	−1.10%

Source: EHESS and INSEE (1968-2023)

== History ==
- In 1218, Bishop Evrard puts the parish under the deanship of Oisemont.
- In the 14th century, it came under the provost of the Vimeu.
- In 1922, the local council agreed to the installation of a telephone kiosk. It wasn't working until 1924.

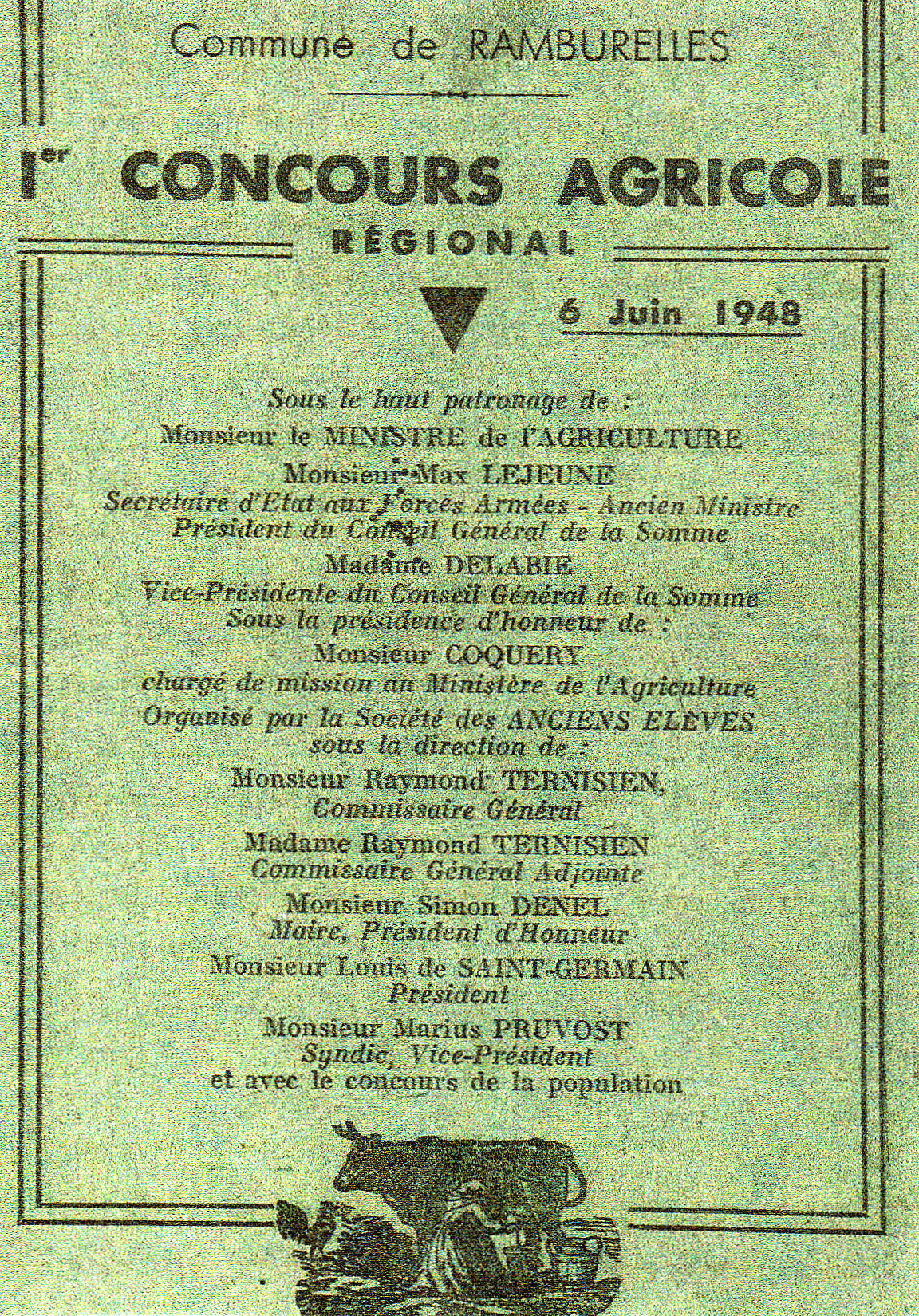
Event from after World War I

.

- In 1922 and 1923, electrification came to the village. Public buildings waited until 1929.
- In 1932, the local council agreed to provide a fresh water supply to the commune. It wasn't completed until 1953.
- Before leaving, in 1944, the Germans burnt down the school and the chateau.
- in 1948, the roads of the commune were covered in tarmac for the first time.

== Heraldry ==
Arms of Ramburelles	The arms of Ramburelles are blazoned : Azure, an inescutcheon argent. (Gouzeaucourt, Saint-Jean-de-Vals, Ramburelles, Saint-Menge, Colombey-les-Belles and Ostreville use the same arms.)

== Places of interest ==
- The traces of a castle can be seen in pastureland near the village.
- The sixteenth century church, completed in 1536
- The château
- The war memorial, from 1922
- Ancient wells, used until clean water was supplied to the village.
- The school. It was planned in 1878 and built soon after.

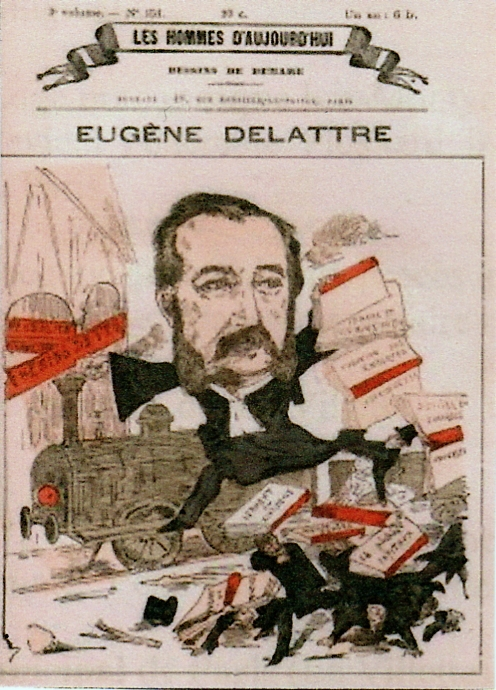
Front page of Les hommes d'aujourd'hui in 1870

== See also ==
- Communes of the Somme department
