= St. Margaret of Cortona School =

Coordinates: 40°54′29.38″N 73°54′11.06″W

St. Margaret of Cortona School, also known as SMS, is a Middle States Accredited Catholic Elementary School located in Riverdale, in the Bronx, New York. St. Margaret's is a Roman Catholic, coed, and religious school. It was founded in 1911 by the Sisters of Charity and the parish of St. Margaret of Cortona.

== Location ==
It is located at 452 W 260th St. Its cross streets are Riverdale Avenue and Delafield Avenue. St. Margaret's is placed in the Northern area of Riverdale, the 10471 section. Riverdale is home to the upper and middle class. Throughout the two zip codes 10471 and 10463, one can find a mixture of luxury apartments overlooking the Hudson River and many colleges, high schools, and grammar schools, both public and private.

== Students and staff ==
St. Margaret Of Cortona School is a private grammar school with grades Pre-K through 8th. A full day pre-Kindergarten is also available for three- and four-year-olds. 331 students attend the school. The ethnicity of the students is as follows: White, non-Hispanic: 68%, Black, non-Hispanic: 3%, Hispanic: 18%, Asian/Pacific Islander: 11% (2003-2004 data).

Students attend school 180 school days per year, 5 days per week. A full day of school begins at 8:00 am and ends at 2:35 pm for grades K-4. Grades 5-8 get out at around 2:45. Students are taught Language, Arts, Reading, Writing, Computers, Mathematics, History, and Science.

Students who are registered in St. Margaret's Parish have priority for admission, but other Catholic students are welcomed if there are spare places. However, the families of students who live outside of the Parish pay higher annual fees.

The pastor is Fr. Sean Connoly and the principal is Mr. Richard Kruzcek, who took over from Mr. Hugh Keenan in 2024. There are 16 teachers and the student to teacher ratio is 1:21. At the start of the September 2007 school year, two new teachers joined SMS: Ms. Christina Washburn, teaching pre-Kindergarten and Ms. Mallon, teaching Physical Education. At the start of the September 2008 school year, Ms. Peterson joined, teaching science to 5th-8th grades and religion to 7th grade.

=== Students in each grade ===
- Kindergarten: 26 students
- First Grade: 27 students
- Second Grade: 36 students
- Third Grade: 25 students
- Fourth Grade: 41 students
- Fifth Grade: 36 students
- Sixth Grade: 27 students
- Seventh Grade: 19 students
- Eighth Grade: 24 students

== After-school and extra-curricular activities ==
This school offers a basketball team that's in the CYO division with 3 different levels for different age groups beginning with the gidgets (grades 3rd-4th), then the junior varsity (grades 5th-6th) team and the varsity team (grades 7th-8th).

An after-school program is given from 2:30pm (dismissal time) until 5pm. Students can play, get after assistance from teachers, and get their work done until pick up time. This grammar school also offers a school band, art classes, and music classes. Other extra-curriculars offered are student council, science fair, spelling bee, academic olympics, and an intramural soccer and basketball team. There is also a Parents Association that hosts dances, benefits, and meetings on how to improve the school for the better.

== Stated aims ==
"The primary purpose of St. Margaret of Cortona School is to offer each child the spiritual, intellectual, personal and social foundation through which he/she will be able to lead a productive and fulfilling Christian life."

== Legal challenges ==
In March 2023, a student's father filed a lawsuit against the New York Archdiocese and the school, claiming that the extreme bullying she endured while there went unaddressed, and led to her attempt to take her own life.

== Notable alumni ==
None
