= Siege of La Charité =

1423 battle of the Armagnac–Burgundian Civil War

- Part of the Armagnac–Burgundian Civil War
Date	November 24 – December 25, 1429
Location	La Charité-sur-Loire, France 47.1778°N 3.0197°E
Result	Impasse, the city delivered to Charles VII against a huge ransom

Belligerents
Armagnacs	Burgundians

Commanders and leaders
Joan of Arc	Perrinet Gressard

The siege of La Charité was incited by the order of Charles VII to Joan of Arc after the warlord Perrinet Gressard seized the town in 1423.

La Charité was not only strongly fortified, but fully victualled for a prolonged siege. Joan's forces were known to be poorly equipped with artillery. On November 7, 1429, the people of Clermont were addressed with a letter asking the town to send supplies to Joan's army for the siege. On November 9, Joan made another request for supplies in preparation. Charles II d'Albret, of Joan's army, sent a letter to Riom on the same day. The assistance came from Bourges and Orléans, which sent soldiers and artillerymen. However, after a month-long struggle in bad weather, the siege was abandoned.

== See also ==
- Siege of Saint-Pierre-le-Moûtier
