= Love Object =

- Love Object onesheet poster
- Directed by: Robert Parigi
- Written by: Robert Parigi
- Produced by: Lawrence Levy; Ed Pressman
- Starring: Desmond Harrington; Melissa Sagemiller; Rip Torn
- Cinematography: Sidney Sidell
- Edited by: Troy Takaki
- Music by: Nicholas Pike
- Production companies: Lolo Film; Visionbox Pictures; Base 12 Productions; Catapult Films
- Distributed by: ContentFilm; Lions Gate Home Entertainment
- Release dates: April 5, 2003 (Philadelphia International Film Festival); February 14, 2004 (limited)
- Running time: 84 minutes
- Country: United States
- Language: English
- Box office: $6,028

Love Object is a 2003 American horror film written and directed by Robert Parigi. Kenneth (played by Desmond Harrington) is an efficient but socially awkward technical writer who develops an obsessive relationship with Nikki, a realistic sex doll he purchases.

== Plot ==
Kenneth Winslow is an extremely shy but knowledgeable technical writer who orders a sex-doll.

He develops a relationship with "Nikki," to the point of talking and even arguing with her. Kenneth begins to display bizarre behavior, and starts to feel stalked by Nikki. Their relationship evolves into a love-hate situation, and at one point he even beats the doll.

At work, Kenneth meets Lisa, a temp, with whom he begins to develop a relationship. Kenneth encourages Lisa to resemble Nikki by cutting her hair the way Nikki has it and wearing the same clothes Nikki has. As his imagined relationship with Nikki becomes more sinister and dominating, Kenneth resorts to cutting up and disposing of the doll.

Lisa eventually becomes aware of Nikki's existence, and promptly breaks up with Kenneth. Later, a bound and gagged Lisa is discovered by Kenneth's landlord, and Kenneth bludgeons him with a hammer. Kenneth then begins to transform Lisa into the doll. He dresses her up in Nikki's clothes, straps her down, and begins to replace her blood with embalming fluid.

Lisa manages to escape from her restraints and attacks Kenneth with a small statue, rendering him unconscious. At this point the police arrive, and when they see Lisa over the unconscious Kenneth they shoot her. Lisa, wearing Nikki's clothes, falls dead in the crate Nikki came in, thus completing her transformation. Kenneth is believed to be Lisa's victim, and is not charged with a crime.

Much later, he re-orders another Nikki. While buying flowers for Nikki, he notices the attractive brunette at the floral shop. The viewer is left to assume that Kenneth's obsessive love triangle cycle will start all over again.

== Cast ==
- Desmond Harrington as Kenneth Winslow
- Melissa Sagemiller as Lisa Bellmer
- Udo Kier as Radley, the landlord
- Rip Torn as Mr. Novak
- Camille Guaty as cashier at floral shop

== Reception ==
On review aggregator website Rotten Tomatoes, the film has an approval rating of 38% based on 24 reviews, with an average rating of 4.8/10.

Marc Savlov of The Austin Chronicle said that "[it f]eels so depressingly vacant that it registers less as a film than as a pointed lesson in what not to do in the wacky world of non-traditional dating".

Carla Meyer of the San Francisco Chronicle wrote "What might have been a commentary on the objectification of women becomes an unrestrained forum for twisted ideas of sexuality".

According to Mark Jenkins of The Washington Post, "The [film is a] sort of clumsy undertaking that trips up everyone and everything in it".

On a contrary, David Sterritt of The Christian Science Monitor said that "Horror fans will find effective shivers", while Elvis Mitchell of The New York Times had praised the director saying that "[he] shows a kinky sense of humor in this brisk low-budget film, and ably creates a smirking menace".
