= Saint-Menge =

- Commune
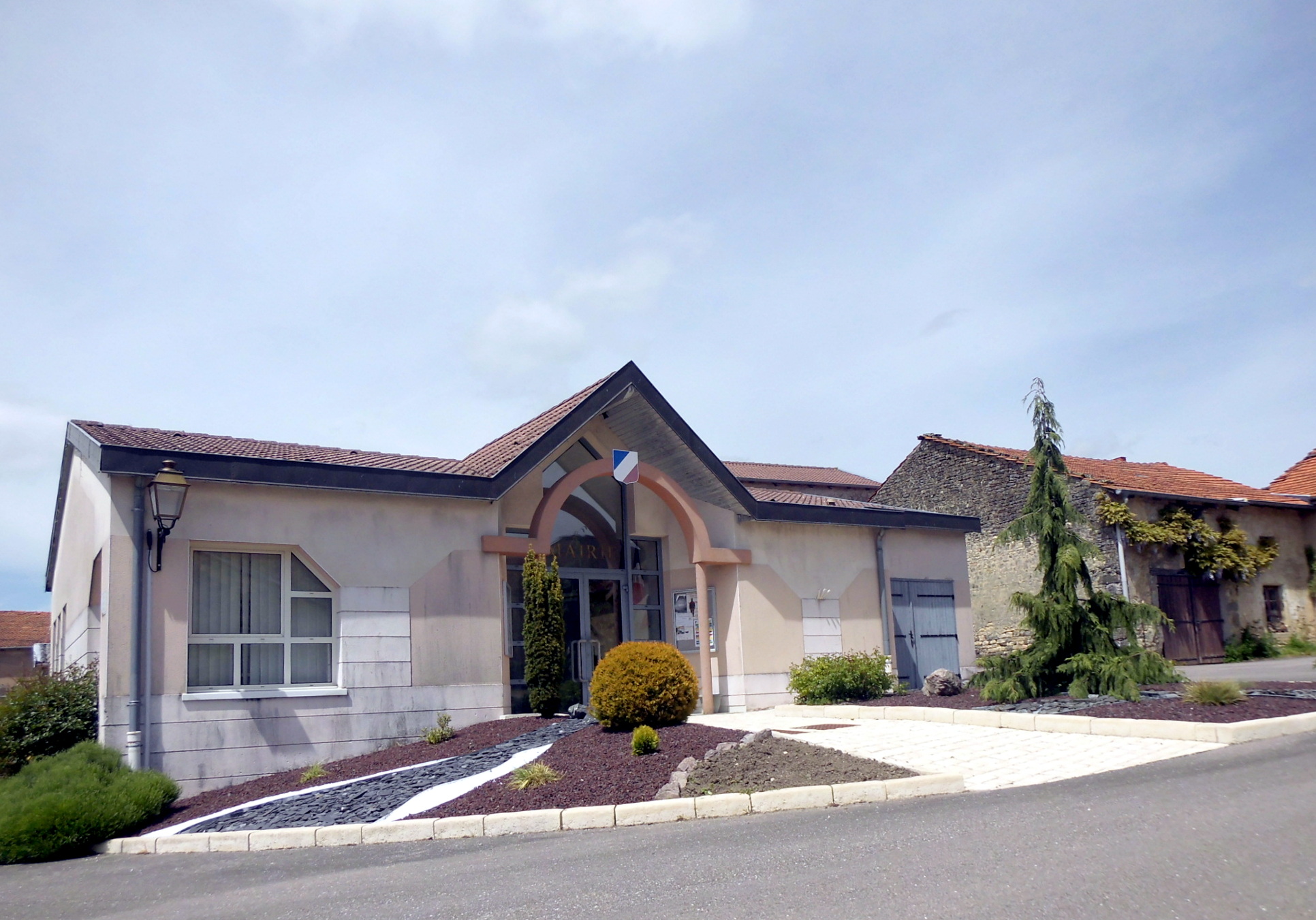
- The town hall in Saint-Menge

- Coat of arms
- Location of Saint-Menge
- Location within France Location within Grand Est
- Coordinates: 48°17′23″N 5°57′18″E
- Country: France
- Region: Grand Est
- Department: Vosges
- Arrondissement: Neufchâteau
- Canton: Mirecourt
- Intercommunality: CC l'Ouest Vosgien

Government
  - Mayor (2020–2026): Jean-Yves Vagnier
- Area^{1}: 6.67 km^{2} (2.58 sq mi)
- Elevation: 330 m (1,080 ft)
- Highest elevation: 406 m (1,332 ft)
- Lowest elevation: 320 m (1,050 ft)
- Population (2023): 115
  - Density: 17.2/km^{2} (44.7/sq mi)
- Time zone: UTC+01:00 (CET)
  - Summer (DST): UTC+02:00 (CEST)
- INSEE/Postal code: 88427 /88170
- ^{1} French Land Register data, which excludes lakes, ponds, glaciers > 1 km^{2} (0.386 sq mi or 247 acres) and river estuaries.

Saint-Menge (French pronunciation: [sɛ̃ mɑ̃ʒ]) is a commune in the Vosges department in Grand Est in northeastern France.

== Heraldry ==
Arms of Saint-Menge	The arms of Saint-Menge are blazoned : Azure, an inescutcheon argent. (Gouzeaucourt, Saint-Jean-de-Vals, Ramburelles, Saint-Menge, Colombey-les-Belles and Ostreville use the same arms.)

== See also ==
- Communes of the Vosges department
