= Dombasle-en-Xaintois =

- Commune
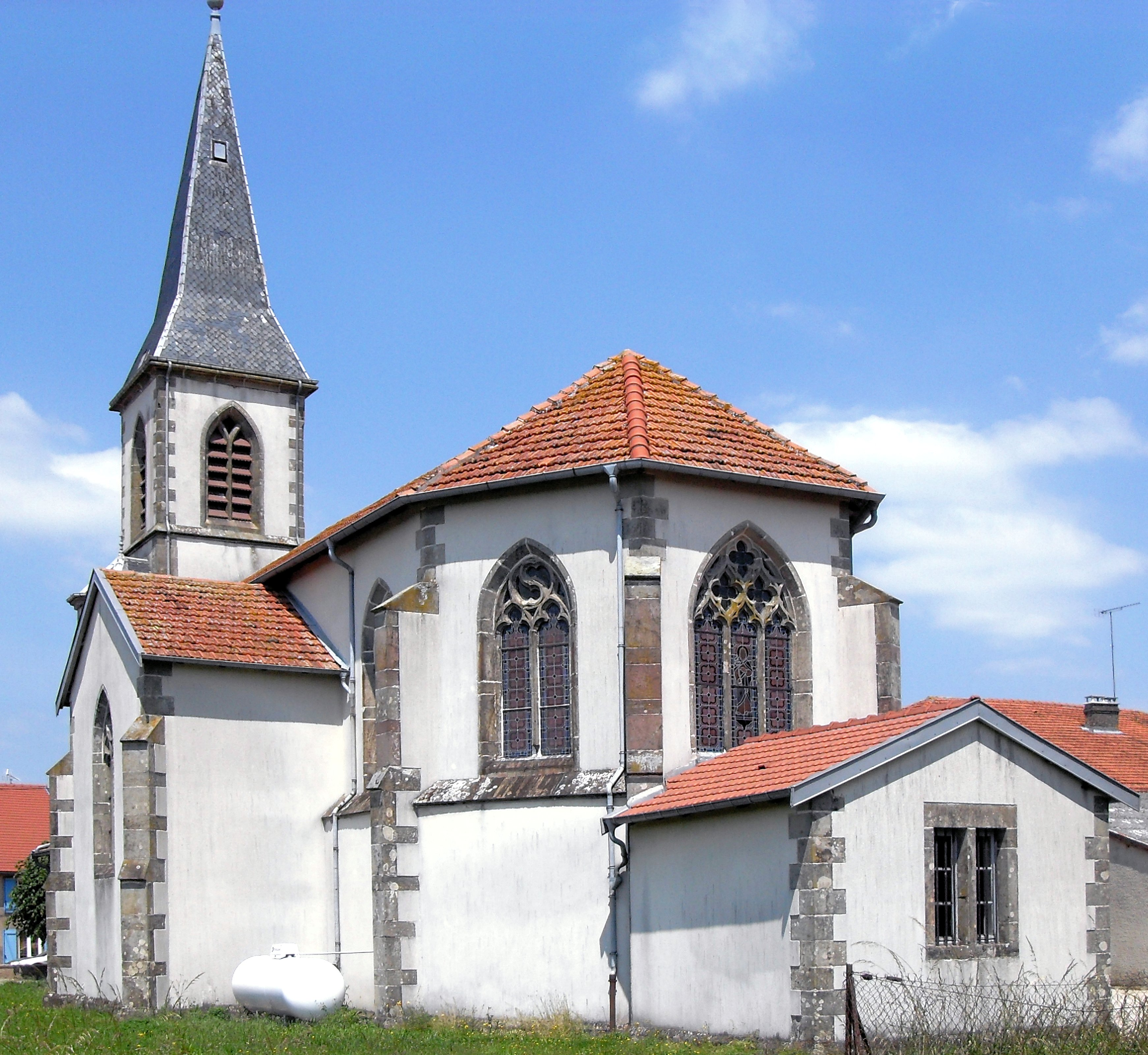
- The church in Dombasle-en-Xaintois
- Location of Dombasle-en-Xaintois
- Location within France Location within Grand Est
- Coordinates: 48°18′30″N 5°59′33″E
- Country: France
- Region: Grand Est
- Department: Vosges
- Arrondissement: Neufchâteau
- Canton: Mirecourt
- Intercommunality: CC Mirecourt Dompaire

Government
  - Mayor (2020–2026): René Gasquin
- Area^{1}: 4.72 km^{2} (1.82 sq mi)
- Elevation: 341 m (1,119 ft)
- Highest elevation: 389 m (1,276 ft)
- Lowest elevation: 328 m (1,076 ft)
- Population (2023): 123
  - Density: 26.1/km^{2} (67.5/sq mi)
- Time zone: UTC+01:00 (CET)
  - Summer (DST): UTC+02:00 (CEST)
- INSEE/Postal code: 88139 /88500
- ^{1} French Land Register data, which excludes lakes, ponds, glaciers > 1 km^{2} (0.386 sq mi or 247 acres) and river estuaries.

Dombasle-en-Xaintois is a commune in the Vosges department in Grand Est in northeastern France.

== See also ==
- Communes of the Vosges department
