= Jeanne d'Arc (video game) =

2006 video game

- Developer: Level-5 (Note: Additional work by Japan Studio.)
- Publisher: Sony Computer Entertainment
- Director: Ken Motomura
- Producers: Akihiro Hino; Nao Higo; Kentaro Motomura
- Writers: Makiko Oochi; Junichi Ishikawa
- Composer: Takeshi Inoue
- Platform: PlayStation Portable
- Release: JP: November 22, 2006; NA: August 21, 2007
- Genre: Tactical role-playing
- Mode: Single-player

Jeanne d'Arc (Note: ジャンヌ・ダルク (Jannu Daruku) in Japanese) is a tactical role-playing video game developed by Level-5 and published by Sony Computer Entertainment for the PlayStation Portable. The game was released in Japan on November 22, 2006 and North America on August 21, 2007. Jeanne d'Arc was Level-5's first role-playing video game of this kind, as well as the studio's first production for the PSP. The title's narrative makes use of various fantasy elements, and is loosely based on the story of Joan of Arc and her struggles against the English occupation of France during the Hundred Years' War in the early 15th century.

The game met with positive reviews upon release, with praise directed at the storyline and historic significance of its events.

On July 16, 2024, the game was re-released for PlayStation 4 and PlayStation 5. This version also serves as the game's first release in European regions.

== Gameplay ==
The player controls Jeanne and her party, moving them between major cities and features on a semi-historical map of France. Most new locations will lead to cutscenes and battles. Select points on the map are cities, allowing the player to shop for improved weapons, armor, and skills; other locations offer skirmish matches not part of the main story but allowing the player to improve their characters through battle.

Each character and enemy has an affinity to one of three phases; Sol, Luna and Stella, each which have strengths and weaknesses against the other phases, in a manner similar to rock, paper, scissors. For example, Sol is stronger against Stella, but weaker against Luna. Each character also has a number of skill slots; skill gems that can be purchased, won in battle, or produced by combining other gems together. These skills can improve a character's stats or bestow offensive, defensive, or recovery skills.

The battle system is turn-based. Prior to battle, the player can manage character equipment and abilities, and then select which characters to bring into battle. On each turn, for each character, the player can move and then perform an action such as attacking, using items or skills; each action awards a number of experience points to the character. Attacks can be met with counterattacks, and the facing of the attack will also influence how much damage is done. Unique to the game is the creation of a "Burning Aura" which forms on the space immediately behind the target of the attack; a second character can move into that space and strike for extra damage, or if a character is already in that space, the Aura will move with that character and increase the power of the attack on that turn only. Burning Auras disappear after one turn.

Once the player has moved all their characters, the enemy turn proceeds in the same manner. When an ally is targeted, all nearby allies one space away from the targeted ally or anyone already supporting them, participate in a "Unified Guard" that can reduce the chance of a hit or reduce the damage taken. This guard also applies to any counterattacks made during the offensive part of the player's turn.

Unique to Jeanne and selected other party members is the use of a magical armband that can be infused with gems. Each gem on the armband can be used once per battle, and only after acquiring an amount of power gems from battle, allows the character to become much more powerful. For example, Jeanne's first transformation gives her a higher attack value, and while in this form, she gains another turn immediately after killing any foe. Transformations are limited to a few turns and the character reverts to their normal form once the effect is over.

Most battles have a required victory condition, such as defeating all foes or to move the party to specific spaces on the map. There are also specialized defeats, such as letting Jeanne fall in battle, or by failing to meet the victory conditions within a fixed number of turns. Upon winning the battle, all characters in the party gain some experience, and additional spoils of war can be obtained.

== Plot ==
A screenshot from early on in the English translation of the game, with the grid clearly detailed.

The game's story is based on a fictionalized period of war between humans and demons. Unable to defeat the demons through combat, five prominent human generals craft five powerful armlets and use their power to banish the demons back to their realm. Many years pass, the unity engendered by the war is lost, and France and England engage in the Hundred Years' War for control of France's wealth and territories. The Duke of Bedford, regent of England and one of the five original heroes, makes a pact with the leader of the demons, letting him possess his nephew Henry VI in exchange for providing the English with demon soldiers.

The main story begins when Domrémy, a small village in the Lorraine region of France, is burned to the ground by English troops, leaving only three survivors: a village girl, Jeanne, and her friends Roger and Liane. Guided by a voice from the heavens and wielding one of the five armlets which bestows powerful abilities upon her, Jeanne sets out to build an army and save her country from the English.

== Development ==
Jeanne d'Arc was developed by Level-5, a company that had previously developed a number of traditional role-playing video games with the Dark Cloud series, Dragon Quest VIII: Journey of the Cursed King, and Rogue Galaxy. Jeanne d'Arc was the company's first project on the PSP handheld. The team chose to make the game a tactical RPG "[...] so that players new to the genre will still be able to play the game, while veteran strategy game players will find this game both nostalgic and entertaining." The development team also wanted to create an enjoyable game for all players despite some of them having no knowledge of the historical events on which it is based.

The most important aspect of the North American localization of Jeanne d'Arc was its voice-overs. A number of French actors and actresses, as well as North American actors speaking with French accents, auditioned for the game's audio. Ultimately, American actors using mild French accents were chosen for the main roles while individuals with authentic French accents were used in some of the game's supporting characters. A French vocal coach was on hand to assure proper pronunciation and accents. Voice actress Kari Wahlgren was approached specifically for the lead role in the English version of the game.

== Reception ==
Reception

Aggregate score
| Aggregator | Score |
|---|---|
| Metacritic | 87/100 |

Review scores
| Publication | Score |
|---|---|
| Electronic Gaming Monthly | 7.67/10 |
| Eurogamer | 7/10 |
| Famitsu | 33/40 |
| Game Informer | 8.5/10 |
| GamePro | 4/5 |
| GameRevolution | B+ |
| GameSpot | 8/10 |
| GameSpy | 4/5 |
| GameZone | 8.9/10 |
| IGN | 9/10 |
| PlayStation: The Official Magazine | 9/10 |
| The A.V. Club | A |
| The New York Times | (favorable) |

Jeanne d'Arc received "generally favorable reviews" according to the review aggregation website Metacritic. IGN said, "Extremely deep gameplay. Balanced tactical strategy and fast paced action with rich game mechanics. An intriguing twist on a well known tale. These three statements only scratch the surface of the game." 1UP.com said, "A gaggle of inferior strategy-RPG options sporting higher asking prices already litters the PSP's substandard role-playing pool, so this fully competent, polished game should be an instant no-brainer for fans of the genre." In Japan, Famitsu gave it a score of one ten, two eights, and one seven, for a total of 33 out of 40.

Jeanne d'Arc sold approximately 45,387 copies during its first week of sale in Japan. The game was listed as the 190th-best-selling game in the country in 2006 by Famitsu with 68,013 copies sold by the end of the year. Jeanne d'Arc was re-released as part of Sony's "The Best" range of budget titles in Japan on July 5, 2007. The game has since become available as a downloadable title from the PlayStation Network in both Japan and North America.

Jeanne d'Arc was listed by IGN as "Game of the Month" for August 2007. In 2011, the website also listed it at #21 among their top 25 best PSP games. GameTrailers made it a nominee for "Best PSP Game" despite not releasing a video review for it. They even said of it, "Passing this one up would be a true act of heresy."

During the 11th Annual Interactive Achievement Awards, the Academy of Interactive Arts & Sciences nominated Jeanne d'Arc for "Handheld Game of the Year" and "Role-Playing Game of the Year", which was ultimately awarded to The Legend of Zelda: Phantom Hourglass and Mass Effect, respectively.
