= Rouvres-en-Xaintois =

- Commune
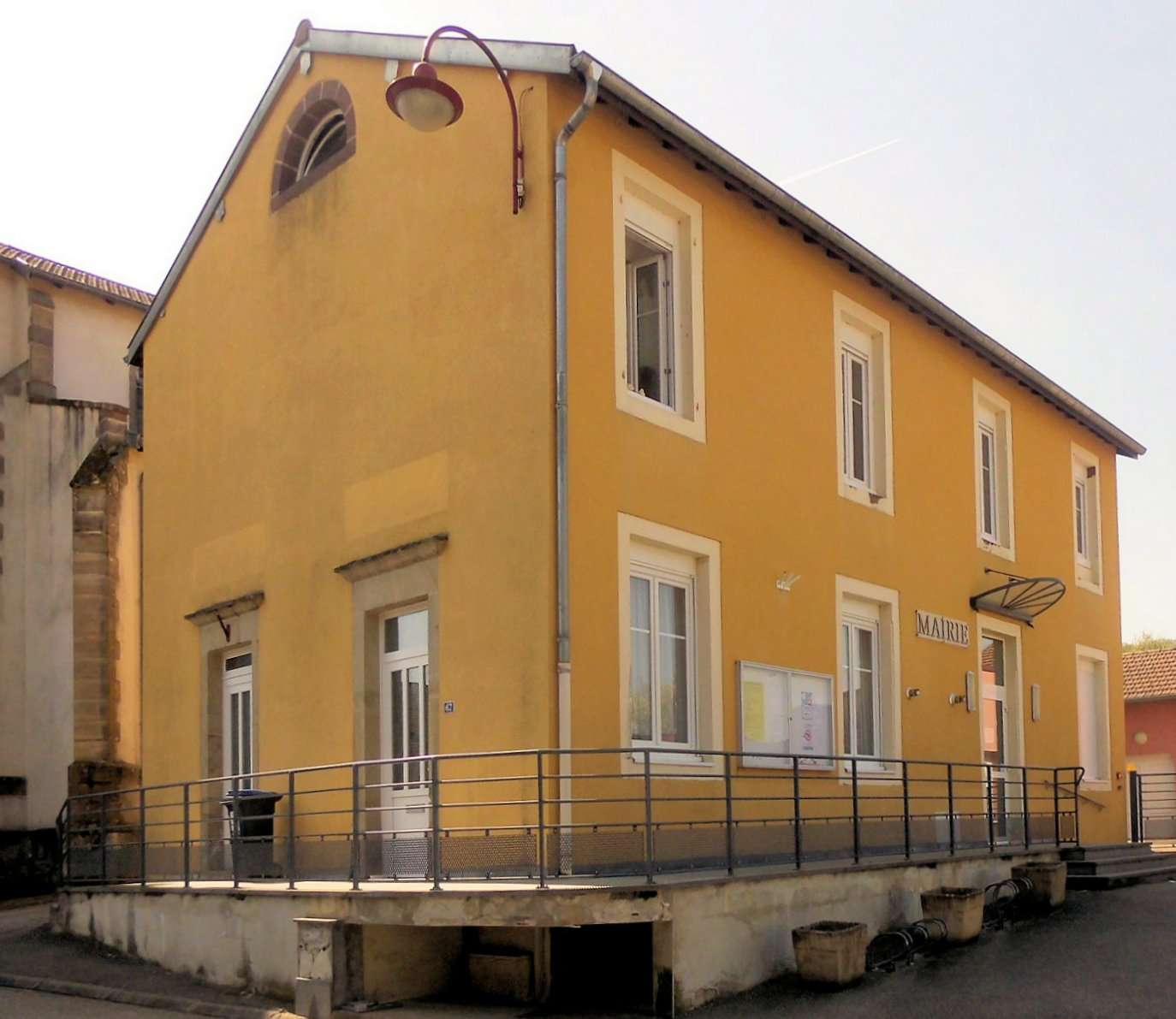
- The town hall in Rouvres-en-Xaintois
- Location of Rouvres-en-Xaintois
- Location within France Location within Grand Est
- Coordinates: 48°18′37″N 6°01′57″E
- Country: France
- Region: Grand Est
- Department: Vosges
- Arrondissement: Neufchâteau
- Canton: Mirecourt
- Intercommunality: CC Mirecourt Dompaire

Government
  - Mayor (2020–2026): Marie-Brigitte Frament
- Area^{1}: 11.19 km^{2} (4.32 sq mi)
- Highest elevation: 421 m (1,381 ft)
- Lowest elevation: 302 m (991 ft)
- Population (2023): 259
  - Density: 23.1/km^{2} (59.9/sq mi)
- Time zone: UTC+01:00 (CET)
  - Summer (DST): UTC+02:00 (CEST)
- INSEE/Postal code: 88400 /88500
- ^{1} French Land Register data, which excludes lakes, ponds, glaciers > 1 km^{2} (0.386 sq mi or 247 acres) and river estuaries.

Rouvres-en-Xaintois is a commune in the Vosges department in Grand Est in northeastern France.

== See also ==
- Communes of the Vosges department
