= Saint-Jean-de-Vals =

- Commune
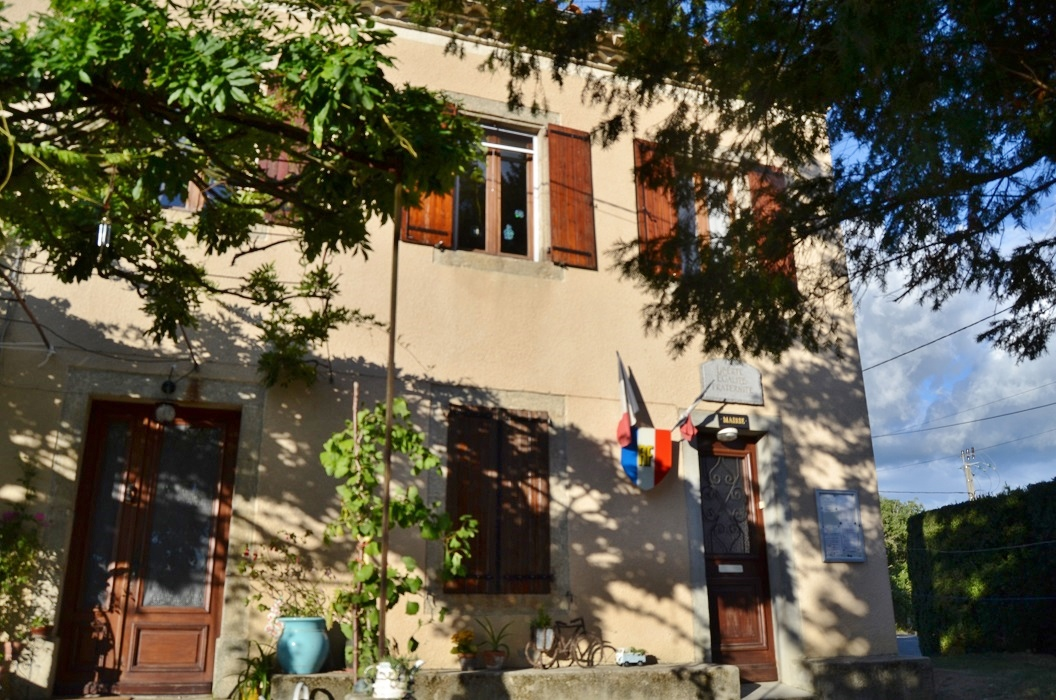
- Town hall

- Coat of arms
- Location of Saint-Jean-de-Vals
- Location within France Location within Occitanie
- Coordinates: 43°41′27″N 2°15′24″E
- Country: France
- Region: Occitania
- Department: Tarn
- Arrondissement: Castres
- Canton: Castres-2

Government
  - Mayor (2020–2026): Christian Saïssac
- Area^{1}: 4.75 km^{2} (1.83 sq mi)
- Elevation: 300 m (980 ft)
- Highest elevation: 389 m (1,276 ft)
- Lowest elevation: 243 m (797 ft)
- Population (2023): 85
  - Density: 18/km^{2} (46/sq mi)
- Time zone: UTC+01:00 (CET)
  - Summer (DST): UTC+02:00 (CEST)
- INSEE/Postal code: 81256 /81210
- ^{1} French Land Register data, which excludes lakes, ponds, glaciers > 1 km^{2} (0.386 sq mi or 247 acres) and river estuaries.

Saint-Jean-de-Vals (French pronunciation: [sɛ̃ ʒɑ̃ də val]; Languedocien: Sant Joan de Vals) is a commune in the Tarn department in southern France.

== See also ==
- Communes of the Tarn department
