= Vaucouleurs =

- Commune
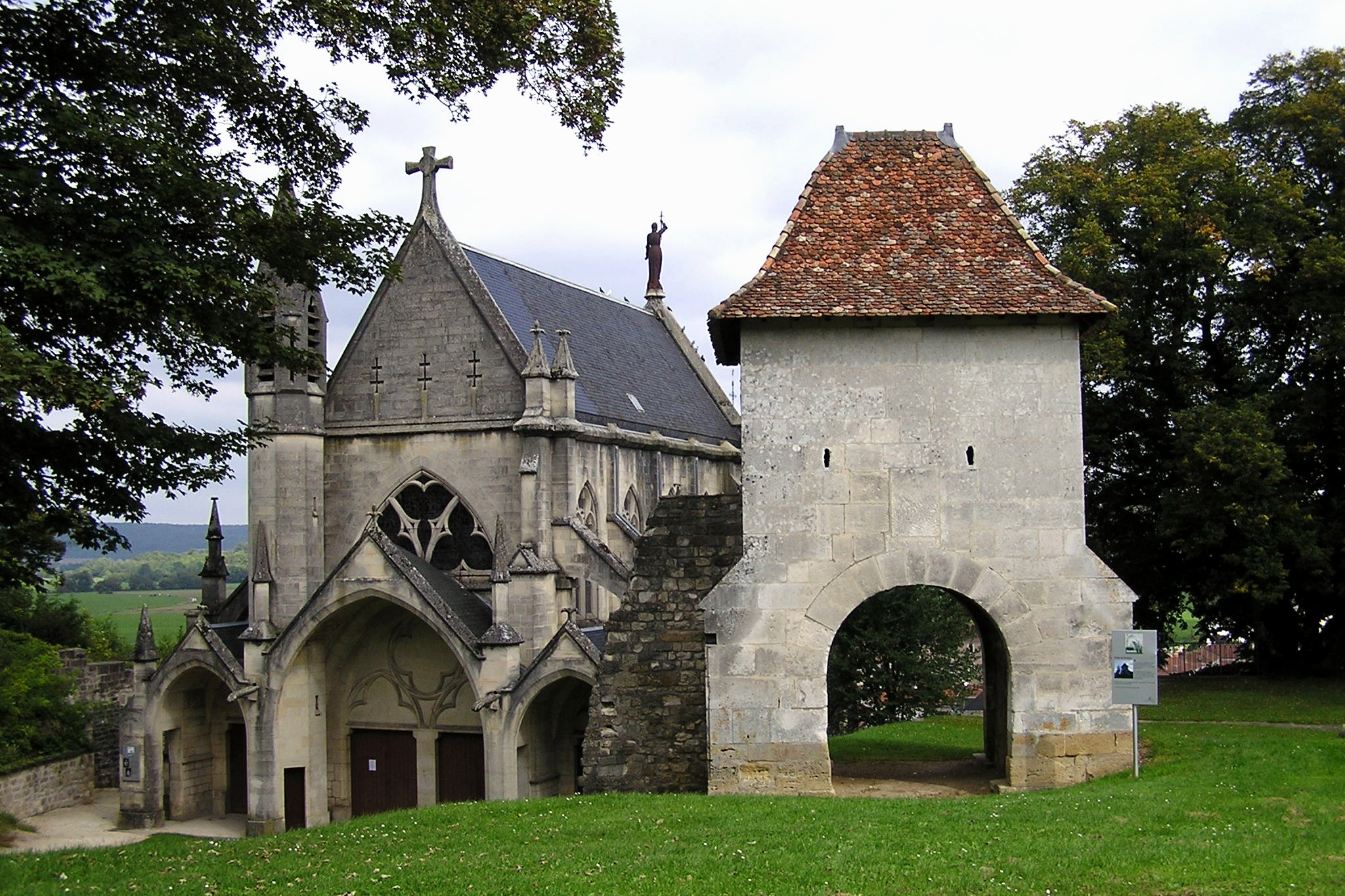
- Chapelle castrale

- Coat of arms
- Location of Vaucouleurs
- Location within France Location within Grand Est
- Coordinates: 48°36′09″N 5°39′57″E
- Country: France
- Region: Grand Est
- Department: Meuse
- Arrondissement: Commercy
- Canton: Vaucouleurs

Government
  - Mayor (2024–2026): Alexis Cochener
- Area^{1}: 39 km^{2} (15 sq mi)
- Highest elevation: 372 m (1,220 ft)
- Lowest elevation: 242 m (794 ft)
- Population (2023): 1,906
  - Density: 49/km^{2} (130/sq mi)
- Time zone: UTC+01:00 (CET)
  - Summer (DST): UTC+02:00 (CEST)
- INSEE/Postal code: 55533 /55140
- ^{1} French Land Register data, which excludes lakes, ponds, glaciers > 1 km^{2} (0.386 sq mi or 247 acres) and river estuaries.

Vaucouleurs (French pronunciation: [vokulœʁ]) is a commune in the Meuse department, northeastern France. It is situated on the river Meuse, approximately 20 km (12 mi) from Toul and Commercy.

== History ==
Geoffrey de Geneville, 1st Baron Geneville (1225/33 – 21 October 1314) also known as Geoffrey de Joinville, was an Anglo-French noble, supporter of Henry III, who appointed him Baron of Trim, County Meath, Ireland. Geoffrey de Geneville was Seigneur of Vaucouleurs in Champagne, second son of Simon of Joinville and Beatrix d'Auxonne and younger brother of Jean de Joinville. Geoffrey's half-sister was wife to one of Eleanor of Provence's uncles, Peter of Savoy, earl of Richmond. Geoffrey was thus one of the "Savoyards" who arrived in England in the retinue of Eleanor at the time of her marriage to King Henry III in 1236.

Joan of Arc stayed in Vaucouleurs for several months during 1428 and 1429 while she sought permission to visit the royal court of Charles VII of France.

The 42nd "Rainbow" Infantry Division (United States) was temporarily located here, initially under the command of MG William A. Mann from 1 November – 18 December 1917, to preliminarily train before transferring to an area between Lafauche and Rimaucourt during the initial stages of direct United States military, ground forces involvement in World War I. Colonel Douglas MacArthur was the chief of staff under Mann for Rainbow Division, and he was stationed in Vaucouleurs during this same time period as well.

== Notable people ==
- Madame du Barry (1743–1793) was the last maîtresse-en-titre of Louis XV.
- Jacques Thuillier (1928–2011) was an art historian.
- Rébeval Joseph Boyer (1768–1822) was a French general.

== Twin towns ==
- Neidenstein, Germany

== See also ==
- Communes of the Meuse department
