= Rehabilitation trial of Joan of Arc =

Posthumous appeal of Joan of Arc's conviction

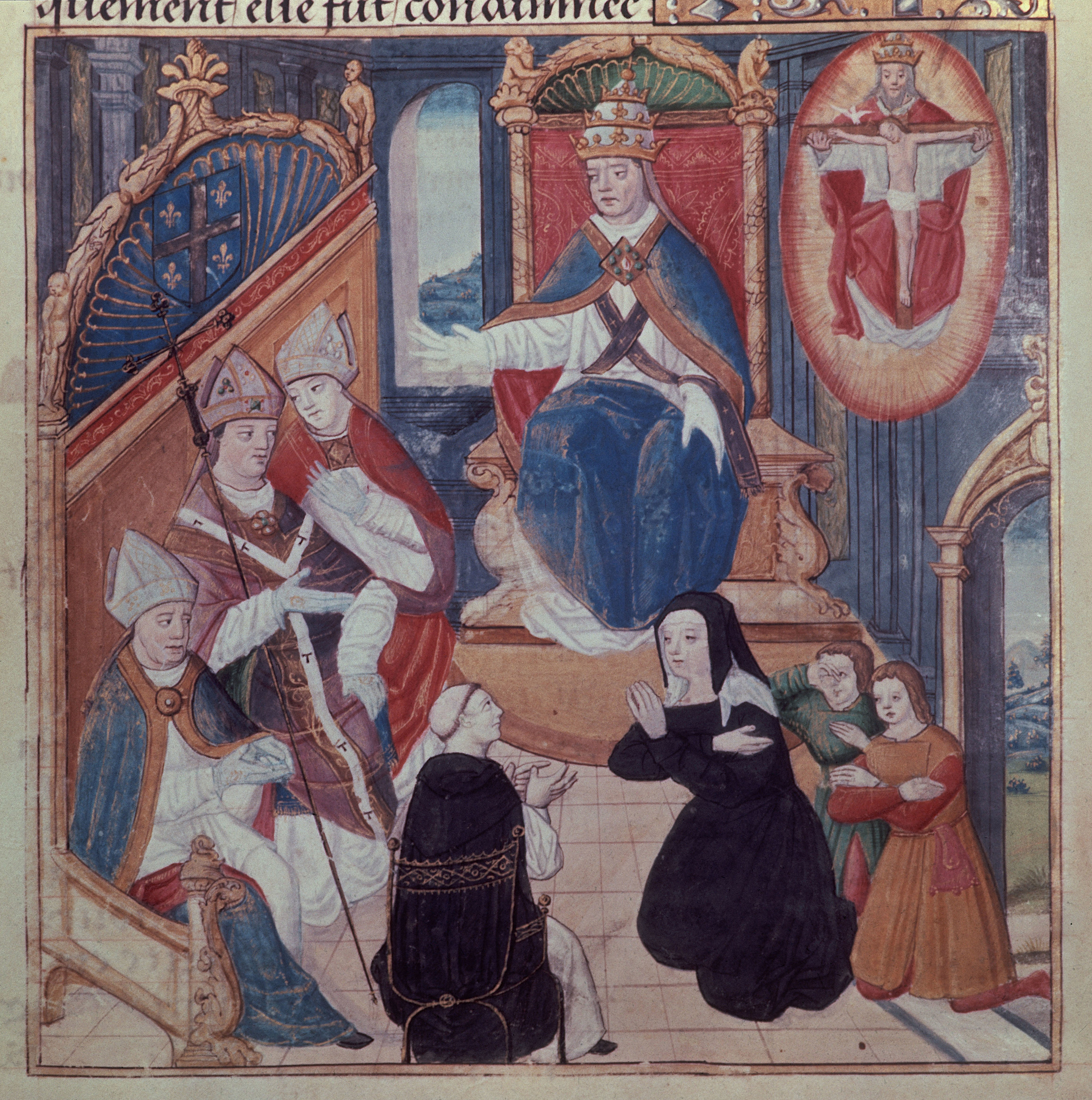
Isabelle Romée and her two sons before Jean Bréhal, inquisitor-general of France. Inspired by the Trinity, Pope Calixtus III authorizes the Rehabilitation trial of Joan of Arc (Manuscrit de Diane de Poitiers, XVIth century).

The conviction of Joan of Arc in 1431 was posthumously investigated on appeal in the 1450s by Inquisitor-General Jean Bréhal at the request of Joan's surviving family—her mother Isabelle Romée and two of her brothers, Jean and Pierre. The appeal was authorized by Pope Callixtus III.

The purpose of the retrial was to investigate whether the trial of condemnation and its verdict had been handled justly and according to ecclesiastical law. Investigations started in 1452, and a formal appeal followed in November 1455. On 7 July 1456, the original trial was judged to be invalid due to improper procedures, deceit, and fraud, and the charges against Joan were nullified.

== Background ==
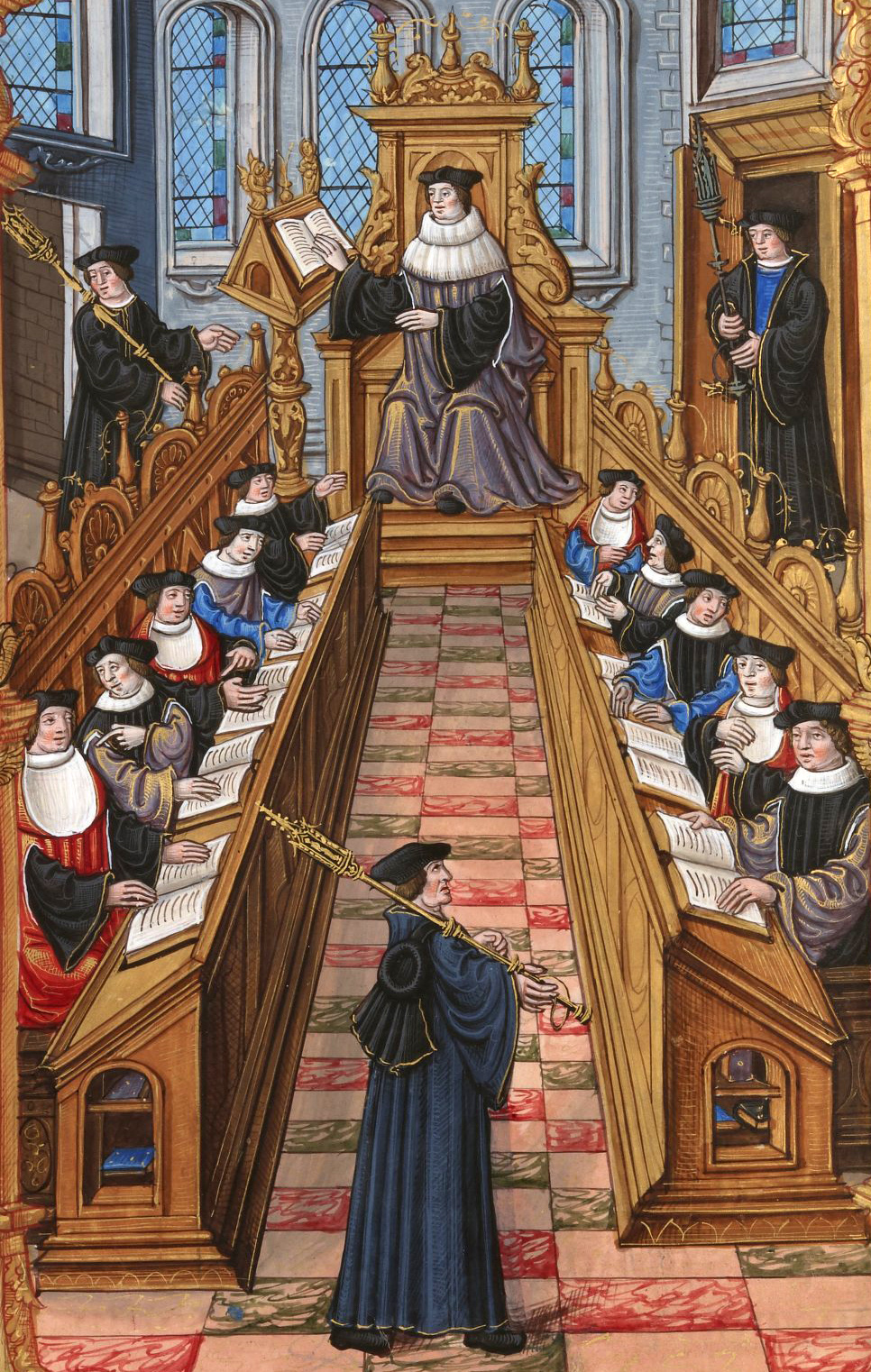
Theologians from the University of Paris were involved in the trial of Joan of Arc in 1431.

The execution of Joan of Arc for heresy occurred in Rouen on 30 May 1431. This created a political liability for Charles VII. Joan had played a major role in his consecration as the king of France. Her condemnation implied that this had been achieved through the actions of a heretic. Prior to 1449, a full reexamination of Joan's trial was not possible, because Rouen, where the documents of Joan's trial were kept, was still held by the English. The town did not fall into Charles VII's hands until November 1449.

== Initial attempts ==
=== Bouillé's review of 1450 ===
On 15 February 1450, Charles VII ordered the clergyman Guillaume Bouillé, a theologian at the University of Paris, to open an enquiry to address the faults and abuses of the original trial. This could cause difficulties, as a member of the University of Paris was being asked to investigate the verdict based on advice given by other members of the same university, some of whom were still alive and holding prominent positions within Church and State. Charles therefore was very cautious, limiting Bouillé's brief to only a preliminary investigation in order to ascertain the trial process. Although there was a suspicion of an unjust condemnation, there was no suggestion at this stage of an inquiry leading to the Inquisition revoking its own sentence.

Yet, there were many prominent people who had willingly collaborated with the English in 1430 who had subsequently changed their allegiance after Charles had regained Paris and Rouen, and such persons had much to lose if Joan's case was reopened. They included men such as Jean de Mailly, now the Bishop of Noyon, who had converted to Charles' cause in 1443, but in 1431 had signed letters in the name of King Henry VI of England, guaranteeing English protection to all those who had participated in the case against Joan. An even greater obstacle was Raoul Roussel, archbishop of Rouen, who had been a fervent supporter of the English cause in Normandy and had participated in Joan's trial, until he, too, took an oath of loyalty to Charles in 1450.

Bouillé only managed to summon seven witnesses—Guillaume Manchon, Isambart de la Pierre, Martin Ladvenu, Guillaume Duval, Jean Toutmouillé, Jean Massieu, and Jean Beaupere—when his inquiry was suddenly broken off in March 1450. He had not even managed to review the dossiers and minutes of the trial of condemnation. Of the seven witnesses, most denounced the English for their desire for revenge against Joan, and their attempt to dishonor Charles VII's title by associating him with a finding of heresy against Joan. Only one was hostile against Joan—Jean Beaupere, the Canon of Rouen. Interviewed by Bouillé, he refused to answer questions about the procedure at the trial of condemnation. He stated that Joan was a fraud, believing that if Joan "had wise and frank teachers, she would have said many things serving to justify her, and withheld many which led to her condemnation." His testimony was not included in the report which Bouillé wrote up for Charles written later that year after Charles had closed down the inquiry. Circumstances had changed—the war against the retreating English was still occupying much of his attention, and there was trouble brewing with the Papacy over the Pragmatic Sanction of Bourges. Charles could afford to wait, but Bouillé made it clear that it was in the king's interest to clear up the matter once and for all.

=== Cardinal d'Estouteville's intervention of 1452 ===
This argument, that the condemnation of Joan had stained the king's honor, was enthusiastically taken up two years later by a man keen to make a good impression of Charles VII—the cardinal Guillaume d'Estouteville. D'Estouteville was the Papal legate in France appointed by Pope Nicholas V in 1451 to negotiate an Anglo-French peace. His commission was hampered by two things: the ongoing success of the French army in throwing the English out of Normandy, and the ongoing debates about the Pragmatic Sanction of Bourges.

D'Estouteville had a number of reasons to take up the cause of Joan's rehabilitation. Firstly, his family had been devoted partisans in the cause of Charles VII in Normandy, losing land during the English occupation. Secondly, he desired to clear the king's name by ending any association with a convicted heretic. Finally, he was anxious to demonstrate his loyalty to his homeland, and to support his sovereign in any matter that did not impact upon the pope's traditional rights.

In February 1452, Charles finally consented to see d'Estouteville. In his capacity as papal legate, he handed over the inquiry to the Inquisitor of France, Jean Bréhal. On 2 May 1452, the inquisitor questioned witnesses connected with the case, followed by more thorough testimony beginning on May 8. This inquiry included most of the former tribunal members who were still living. Though Charles was keen to know the facts behind the case, he was not enamored of the thought of the Inquisition running a high-profile case in France outside of royal control. By December 1452, through d'Estouteville's intervention, the case had taken on a life of its own, independent of Charles.

The problems of the collaborators would not go away. At d'Estouteville's inquiry of May 1452, two vital but highly placed witnesses were not called—Raoul Roussel, archbishop of Rouen and Jean Le Maître, vicar of the Inquisition in 1431. Though new testimonies were taken from two canons of Rouen cathedral, neither of them remembered very much about the events of 1431. By January 1453, d'Estouteville had returned to Rome, his principal mission to negotiate a peace having been unsuccessful. However, the Inquisitor Bréhal had been busy collecting information and learned opinions from canonists and theologians on the case. Even more importantly, the month before saw the death of the Archbishop Roussel, removing a substantial obstacle to the reopening of the trial and the rehabilitation of Joan.

=== Retrial and rehabilitation, 1455–56 ===
Almost two years elapsed before a new push emerged to clear Joan's name. War with the Islamic Ottoman Empire in 1453 distracted the Church with attempts to organize a crusade. Impetus for renewed attention to Joan's case came from the surviving members of Joan's family, her mother Isabelle and two of her brothers, Jéan and Pierre. Addressing a petition to the new pope, Callixtus III, with help from d'Estouteville who was the family's representative in Rome, they demanded the reparation of Joan's honor, a redress of the injustice she suffered and the citation of her judges to appear before a tribunal. Inquisitor Bréhal took up their cause and traveled to Rome in 1454 to meet with the Pope "touching the trial of the late Joan the Maid". In response to this plea, Callixtus appointed three members of the French higher clergy to act in concert with Inquisitor Bréhal to review the case and pass judgment as required. The three men were Jean Juvenal des Ursins, archbishop of Rheims, Richard Olivier de Longueil, bishop of Coutances, and Guillaume Chartier, bishop of Paris.

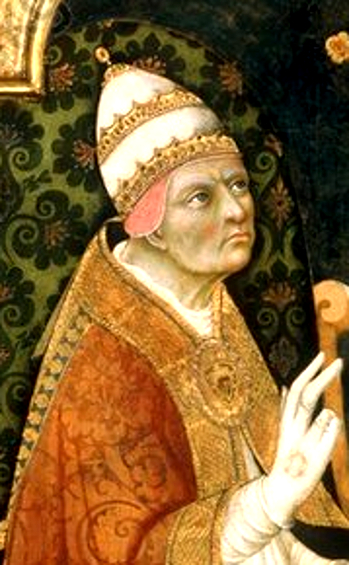
Pope Callixtus III was instrumental in ordering the retrial of Joan of Arc in 1455 after receiving a petition from her family.

Of the three, the Archbishop of Rheims was the most prestigious, occupying the highest ecclesiastical seat in France. He also demonstrated a great deal of reticence towards the case and Joan's memory, going so far as to advise Joan's mother in 1455 not to proceed with her claim. There were reasons for this. He had held the see of the Diocese of Beauvais from 1432, which had been the diocese where Joan had been condemned just the year before. He was also a supporter of Gallicanism, and was very concerned with Pope Callixtus' and d'Estouteville's interference in the affairs of the French Church. He was however, concerned about the claims that Charles had recovered his kingdom by using a heretic and a sorceress, and thus by default he too was a heretic.

On 7 November 1455 the retrial opened at Notre-Dame Cathedral. Joan's family were present, and Isabelle made an impassioned speech which began: "I had a daughter born in lawful wedlock, whom I had furnished worthily with the sacraments of baptism and confirmation and had reared in the fear of God and respect for the tradition of the Church ... yet although she never did think, conceive, or do anything whatever which set her out of the path of the faith ... certain enemies ... had her arraigned in religious trial ... in a trial perfidious, violent, iniquitous, and without shadow of right ... did they condemn her in a fashion damnable and criminal, and put her to death very cruelly by fire ... for the damnation of their souls and in notorious, infamous, and irreparable damage done to me, Isabelle, and mine".

The appellate process included clergy from France and the Roman court, and included the opinions of a theologian from Austria. A panel of theologians analyzed testimony from some 115 witnesses, most of whom had testified to her purity, integrity and courage. The witnesses included many of the tribunal members who had placed her on trial; a couple dozen of the villagers who had known her during her childhood; a number of the soldiers who had served during her campaigns; citizens of Orleans who had met her during the lifting of the siege; and many others who provided vivid and emotional details of Joan's life. Some of the former tribunal members were less forthcoming under examination, repeatedly claiming not to remember the details of the 1431 proceedings, especially regarding whether Joan had been tortured. After the final depositions had been taken and the theologians had given their verdicts, Inquisitor Bréhal drew up his final analysis in June 1456, suggesting that the late Pierre Cauchon and his assessors may have been guilty of heresy.

The court declared her innocent on 7 July 1456 by annulling her sentence. They declared that Joan had been tried as a result of "false articles of accusation". Those articles and Cauchon's sentence were to be torn out of a copy of the proceedings and burnt by the public executioner at Rouen. The Archbishop of Rheims read out the appellate court's verdict: "In consideration of the request of the d'Arc family against the Bishop of Beauvais, the promoter of criminal proceedings, and the inquisitor of Rouen ... in consideration of the facts. ... We, in session of our court and having God only before our eyes, say, pronounce, decree and declare that the said trial and sentence (of condemnation) being tainted with fraud (dolus malus), calumny, iniquity and contradiction, and manifest errors of fact and of law ... to have been and to be null, invalid, worthless, without effect and annihilated ... We proclaim that Joan did not contract any taint of infamy and that she shall be and is washed clean of such". But the judges did not make any pronouncements on Joan's orthodoxy or sanctity.

Joan's elderly mother lived to see the final verdict announced, and was present when the city of Orleans celebrated the event by giving a banquet for Inquisitor Bréhal on 27 July 1456. Although Isabelle's request for punishment against the tribunal members did not materialize, nonetheless the appellate verdict cleared her daughter of the charges that had hung over her name for twenty-five years.
