= Jean Bréhal =

French theologian and inquistor-general of France

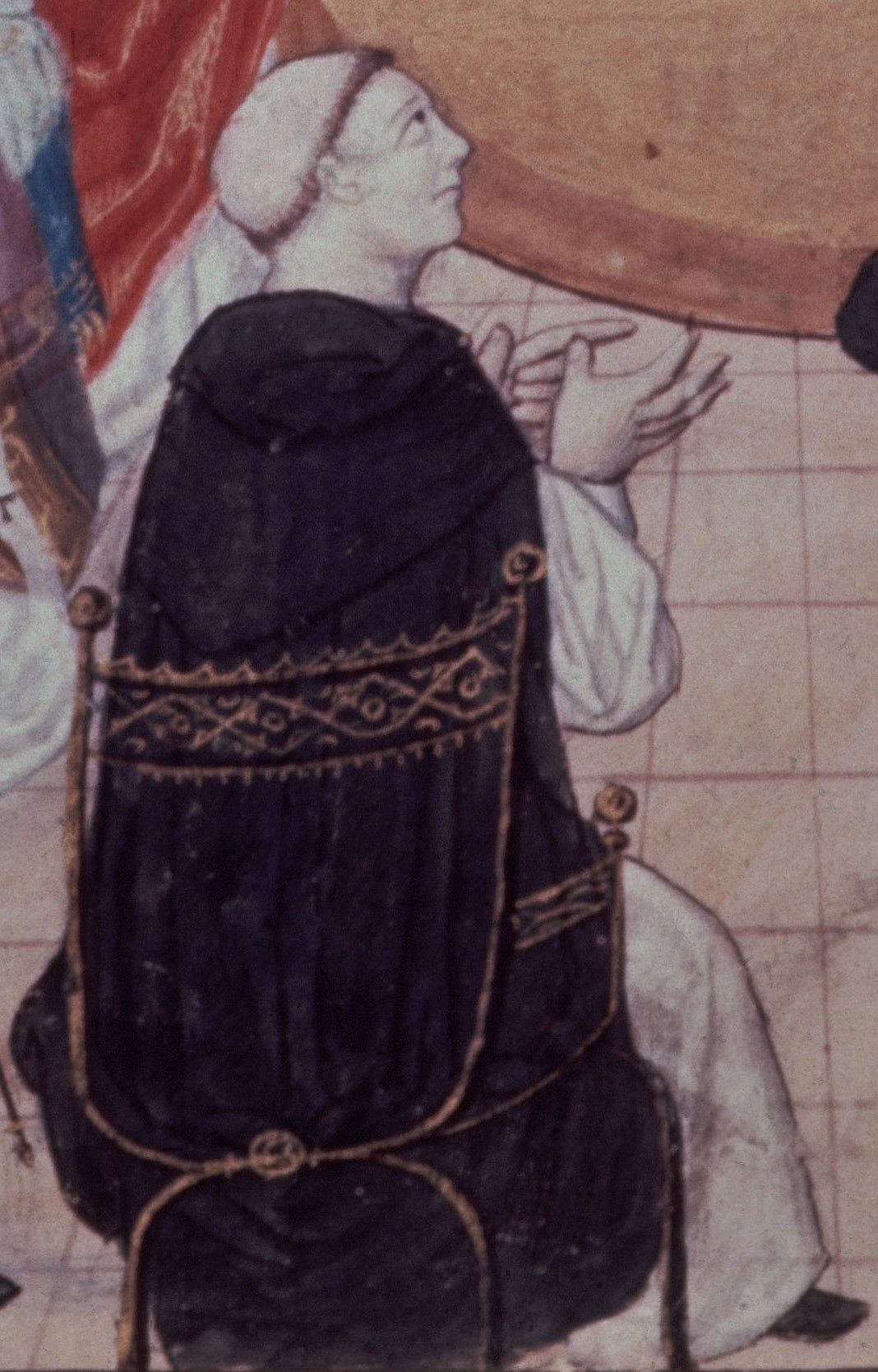
- Jean Bréhal. Miniature of the Manuscript of Diane de Poitiers. 16th Century. Private collection.

Orders
- Ordination: Dominican Order

Personal details
- Born: Circa 1400 Normandy, France
- Died: Circa 1479 Évreux, Normandy, France
- Denomination: Catholicism
- Occupation: Inquisitor-General of France
- Education: University of Caen

Jean Bréhal OP was the inquisitor-general of France who led the effort to rehabilitate Joan of Arc.

== Biography ==
Little is known about the life of Jean Bréhal with the exception of some documents regarding his career within the Dominican Order. It is known that he made his profession of faith among the Dominicans of the city of Évreux and remained faithful to the city's best interests for the rest of his life. He studied philosophy and theology for seven years at the University of Caen, supported financially by the ébroïciens, until 1443, when he was made Doctor of Theology. In 1452, while residing in Paris, he became the Inquisitor-general of France; and two years later, in 1455, was elected prior of the convent of Saint-Jacques of Paris and finally elected to review the trial of Joan of Arc's conviction. In 1474, he returned to his convent Saint-Louis d'Évreux, and became vicar of the master of the order. During the remainder of his life as vicar he tried to reform the lives of the Dominicans by encouraging a return to poverty and the community of goods. He died sometime around 1479.

== Retrial of Joan of Arc ==
During the initial stages of Joan's rehabilitation, in 1452, Bréhal was given the task of reviewing her case by the papal legate in France, Cardinal Guillaume d'Estouteville. During the course of that year and up until 1453, Bréhal traveled all around the country and he questioned several witnesses in Rouen, where Joan was imprisoned and executed, sought information all over the kingdom about her life, and consulted several lawyers and theologians in both France and Europe, as well as Thomas Basin, bishop of Lisieux. In 1455, Callixtus III, the Pope at that time, was pressured by d'Estouteville, representing Joan's mother, Isabelle Romée, and two of her brothers, to clear her name. In response to the petition, Callixtus gave his full support to Bréhal and appointed three agents that would assist him during the procedures: Jean Juvénal des Ursins, archbishop of Reims, Guillaume Chartier, bishop of Paris and Richard Olivier de Longueil, bishop of Coutances.

During his research, Bréhal wrote two books about the matter; in the first, the Summarium, he sets out the facts around the trial of 1431; while in the second, he refutes point by point the accusations against Joan on the basis of theology and canon law. On November 7, 1455, he presided the retrial at Notre-Dame, where he questioned, along with several theologians and clergymen of all Europe, a total of 115 witnesses that knew Joan; from childhood friends, soldiers whom served under her command, citizens of Orleans and, with not so much enthusiasm, former members of the tribunal that condemned her in 1431. With all the information he heard, Bréhal declared in June 1456 that Joan had died a martyr and posthumously excommunicated Pierre Cauchon, the main instigator of the trial, branding him as an heretic who was pursuing a secular vendetta. One year later, Pope Callixtus III confirmed the excommunication.

Bréhal was present during the final declaration of Joan's innocence on July 7, in Rouen, when all articles of Joan's trial where burnt publicly. In Orleans, he presided over the commemorative feasts and it was likely that he met Joan's elderly mother during a celebratory banquet that the citizens offered to Inquisitor Bréhal on July 27.

== Bibliography ==
- Régine Pernoud, Jeanne d'Arc. Paris, 1981.
- Marie Joseph Belon and François Balme, Jean Bréhal, gran inquisiteur de France, et la réhabilitation de Jeanne d'Arc. Paris, P. Lethielieux, 1893, VII-152-188 p. (Available for online consultation at https://gallica.bnf.fr/ark:/12148/bpt6k57463473)
- P. Duparc, « Le procès en annulation de la condamnation de Jeanne d'Arc », Précis analytique des travaux de l'Académie de Rouen, 1982 et 1983.
- André Plaisse, Évreux et les Ébroïciens au temps de Louis XI, édité par la Société libre de l'Eure, 1986.
