= Bréhal (surname) =

Bréhal is a French surname. Notable people with the name include:

- Jean Bréhal, French inquisitor-general who led the effort to rehabilitate Joan of Arc
- Nicolas Bréhal (1952–1999), French novelist and literary critic
