= Alternative historical interpretations of Joan of Arc =

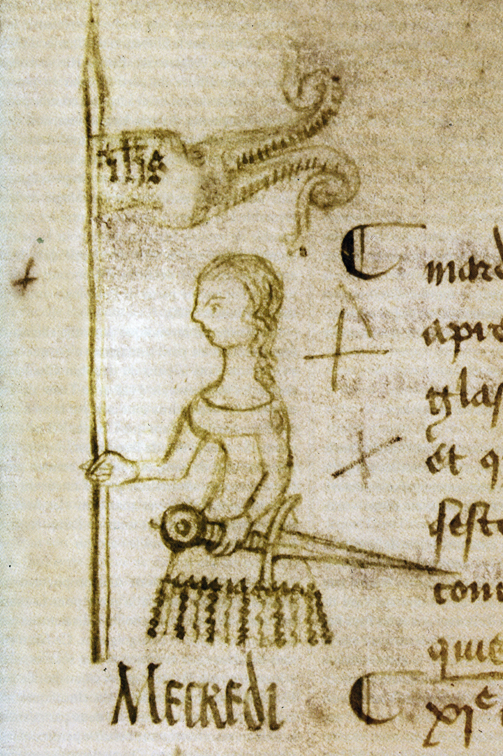
Joan of Arc drawing by Clément de Fauquembergue, 1429. The artist never saw Joan.

There are a number of revisionist theories about Joan of Arc which contradict the established account of her life. These include the theories she was an illegitimate royal child; that she was not burned at the stake; that most of her story is a fabrication; and that she escaped death at the stake. These theories have not gained significant acceptance among academic historians.

These alternate historical interpretations are distinct from avowedly fictional representations of Joan in art, literature, and popular culture.

== Royal bastard ==
Arms granted to Joan of Arc and her family by Charles VII of France

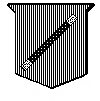
An actual baton sinister from an old heraldry manual. In 1805 Pierre Caze claimed the sword in Joan's coat of arms was a baton of bastardy.

In 1819, Pierre Caze published La Vérité sur Jeanne d'Arc, which argued that Joan of Arc was the illegitimate daughter of the Queen, Isabeau of Bavaria, and Duke Louis of Orléans. According to Caze's reasoning, the queen hid their daughter in the countryside with the d'Arc family. When Joan of Arc met the future King Charles VII, she would have given him a private sign that she was his half-sister. It has been theorized that the coat of arms he later granted her included a sword as a baton of bastardy.

Although this would provide an explanation for how she gained the trust of Charles VII in early 1429, this hypothesis has too many other difficulties to be taken seriously. Foremost among them is that the duke of Orléans died on November 23, 1407. Isabeau of Bavaria delivered a son on November 10, 1407. The likelihood of conceiving a daughter in the interim is exceedingly small. Assuming Joan of Arc was born the following year, she would have been 23 years old at her trial in 1431. She estimated her own age at 19.

Furthermore, if the sword in Joan of Arc's coat of arms represented a baton of bastardy, then it would be unique in heraldry; it is inconsistent with the laws of heraldry that a sword party per pale (see "Coat of Arms of Jeanne d'Arc") be considered a sign of illegitimacy. It would also mean that Joan of Arc and several witnesses perjured themselves about her birth. In the words of Regine Pernoud and Marie-Veronique Clin, "Yet amateur historians still insist that all these people – as well as Charles VII, the duke of Alençon, Dunois, Bertrand de Poulengy – carried out an intricate plot to disguise Joan's authentic royal parents. This thesis lacks credible documentation."

== Survival ==
Several impostors claimed to be Joan of Arc after the execution date. The most successful was Jeanne (or Claude) des Armoises. Claude des Armoises married the knight Robert des Armoises and claimed to be Joan of Arc in 1436. She gained the support of Joan of Arc's brothers. She carried on the charade until 1440, gaining gifts and subsidies. One chronicle states, "In this year there came a young girl who said she was the Maid of France and played her role so well that many were duped by her, and especially the greatest nobles."

Some modern authors attempt to revive this claim by asserting that some other victim was substituted for Joan of Arc at the stake. The likelihood of this is extremely thin, since the trial of nullification records sworn testimony from numerous witnesses who were present at the execution and confirmed her identity.

E. Cobham Brewer wrote in his 1870 volume Brewer's Dictionary of Phrase and Fable:

M. Octave Delepierre has published a pamphlet, called Doute Historique, to deny the tradition that Joan of Arc was burnt at Rouen for sorcery. He cites a document discovered by Father Vignier in the seventeenth century, in the archives of Metz, to prove that she became the wife of Sieur des Armoise, with whom she resided at Metz, and became the mother of a family. Vignier subsequently found in the family muniment-chest the contract of marriage between "Robert des Armoise, knight, and Jeanne D'Arcy, surnamed the Maid of Orleans." In 1740 there were found in the archives of the Maison de Ville (Orléans) records of several payments to certain messengers from Joan to her brother John, bearing the dates 1435, 1436. There is also the entry of a presentation from the council of the city to the Maid, for her services at the siege (dated 1439). M. Delepierre has brought forward a host of other documents to corroborate the same fact, and show that the tale of her martyrdom was invented to throw odium on the English.

The revisionist theory described by Brewer has been criticized on a number of grounds, including the significant number of eyewitnesses to Joan's execution, as well as the fact that Claude des Armoises subsequently confessed before a number of witnesses on multiple occasions to being an impostor.

Graeme Donald also argues that Joan was not executed for witchcraft and that much of the story of Joan of Arc is a myth. He says there are no accounts or portraits of Joan of Arc's victories during her time period, nor is she mentioned as a commander of the French army by Chastellain. He states that the most definitive work of her trial and rehabilitation trial, which are the basis for her story, was created by Jules Quicherat between 1841 and 1849, after he discovered a cache of documents relating to her trial. Quicherat did compile one of the first valid edition of her trial and the rehabilitation trial proceedings, but the existence of the records of Joan's trial and retrial were known before Quicherat collected and collated them. The original sources of the rehabilitation sources have been further verified, edited and amplified by Pierre DuParc's translation published in 1988.

== Witch ==
In 1921, anthropologist Margaret Murray argued that Joan was correctly identified as a witch by the religious authorities who condemned her to death, but that what they called witchcraft was, in fact, a survival of the pagan "old religion" of pre-Christian Europe. She claimed that Joan and Gilles de Rais were leaders of a pagan witch-cult that was a rival to the Catholic church. Joan was the "incarnate God" of a cult derived from the worship of the virgin huntress Diana. Murray claimed that this was still the religion of most of the common people and the reason Joan inspired the ordinary soldier:

The men-at-arms, drawn from the lower orders, followed without hesitation one whom they believed to have been sent by their God, while the whole army was commanded by Marshal Gilles de Rais, who apparently tried to belong to both religions at once.

According to Murray, the destruction of Joan was orchestrated by the Catholic Church itself and was its first major victory against the surviving pagan cult:

The fifteenth century marks the first great victories of the Church. Beginning with the trials in Lorraine in 1408 the Church moved triumphantly against Joan of Arc and her followers in 1431, against Gilles de Rais and his coven in 1440, against the witches of Brescia in 1457.

Murray's views have been dismissed by later scholars as pseudo-historical fantasy. One historian called her ideas "vapid balderdash". Her claims about Joan of Arc were dismissed by historians based on the extensive evidence of Joan's actual religious views, such as the letters she dictated in which she defines her faith in "King Jesus, King of Heaven and of all the earth, my rightful and sovereign Lord." and the many eyewitness accounts of her beliefs and behaviour.
