= Richard Olivier de Longueil =

French Roman Catholic bishop and cardinal

His Eminence Richard Olivier de Longueil
- Bishop of Coutances
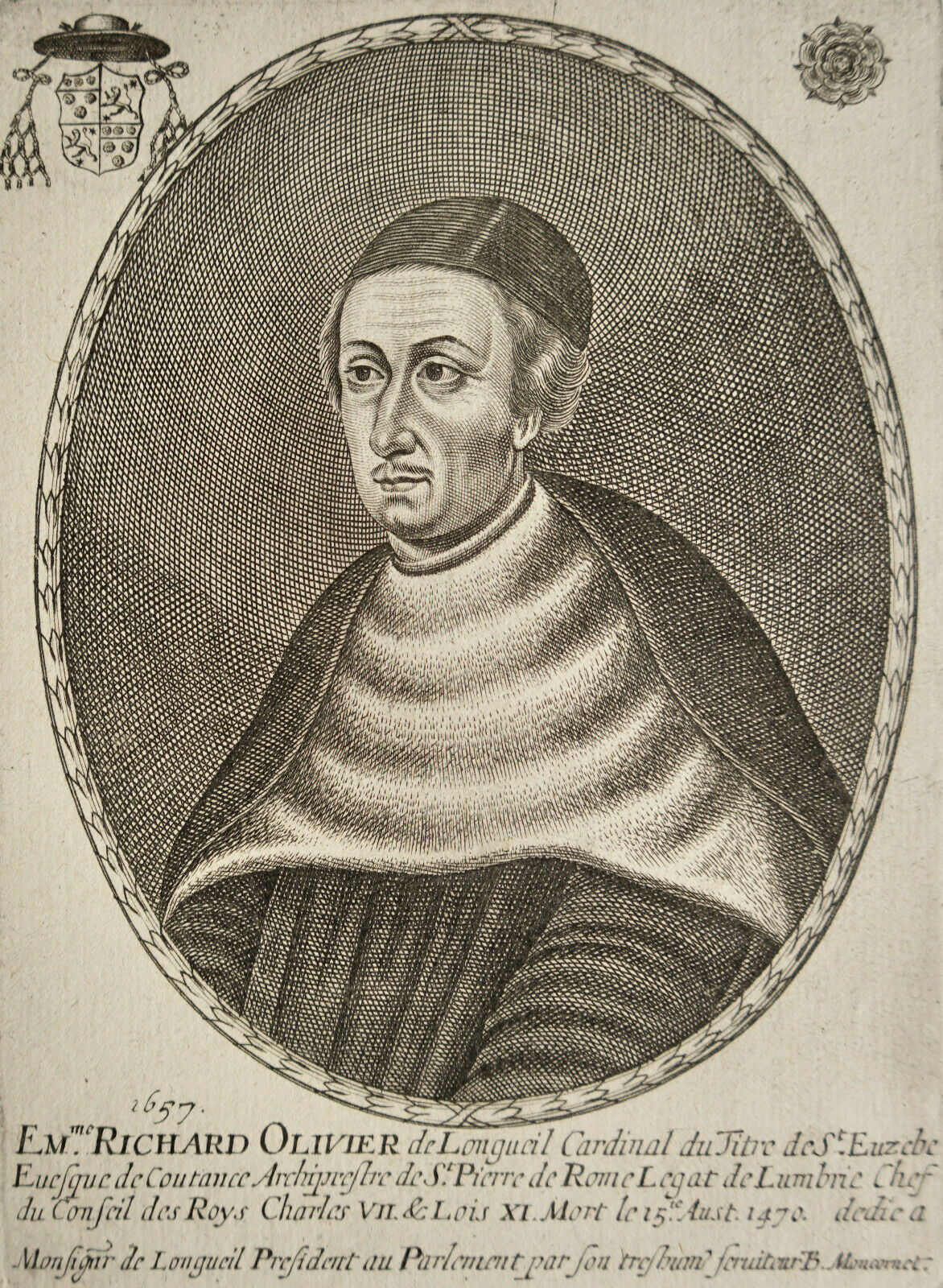
- Church: Catholic Church
- Diocese: Coutances
- Appointed: 3 October 1453
- Term ended: 19 August 1470
- Predecessor: Giovanni Castiglione
- Successor: Benoît de Montferrand
- Other posts: Cardinal-Priest of Sant'Eusebio (1462-1470)

Orders
- Consecration: 28 September 1453
- Created cardinal: 17 December 1456 by Pope Callixtus III
- Rank: Cardinal-Priest

Personal details
- Born: 18 December 1406 Lisieux, France
- Died: 19 August 1470 (aged 63) Sutri, Italy
- Buried: St Mark's Basilica
- Coat of arms

Richard Olivier de Longueil (1406–1470) (called the Cardinal of Coutances or the Cardinal of Eu) was a French Roman Catholic bishop and cardinal.

== Biography ==
Richard Olivier de Longueil was born in Lisieux on 18 December 1406, the son of Guillaume III de Longueil, sieur of Eu, and his second wife, Catherine de Bourguenole. His family was an old noble family from Normandy.

After receiving a licentiate in law, Longueil became a protonotary apostolic. He went on to become president of the Chambre des comptes and cantor of Lisieux Cathedral. He became a canon of Rouen Cathedral and Archdeacon of Eu. In 1452, the cathedral chapter of Rouen Cathedral wished to make him Archbishop of Rouen, but he declined.

In 1453, he was elected Bishop of Countances. He was consecrated as a bishop on 28 September 1453. He was preconized as bishop by Pope Callixtus III on 3 October 1453 and took the oath of loyalty to Charles VII of France on 12 May 1454. He occupied the see of Coutances until his death.

On 11 June 1455 Pope Callixtus III named Bishop Longueil, along with Guillaume d'Estouteville, Archbishop of Rouen and Guillaume Chartier, Bishop of Paris, to a papal commission charged with posthumously retrying Joan of Arc. Her rehabilitation was pronounced in the archiepiscopal palace of Rouen on 7 July 1456. Pleased with this outcome, Charles VII named Longueil to the Grand Conseil and later honored him with his trust by naming him as Charles' envoy on a mission to Philip the Good, Duke of Burgundy.

At the request of the King of France, Pope Callixtus III made Longueil a cardinal priest in the consistory of 17 December 1456. He did not participate in the papal conclave of 1458 and the red hat did not arrive in France until later in 1458. Shortly after, in the Estates General, he proposed revoking the Pragmatic Sanction of Bourges (1438); for this action, he was praised by Pope Pius II and fined 10,000 livres by the Estates.

On 15 August 1461 he attended the coronation of Louis XI of France and shortly thereafter resigned as president of the Chambres des comptes.

Louis XI revoked the Pragmatic Sanction of Bourges and Cardinal Longueil was part of a delegation (including Jean Jouffroy, Bishop of Arras) sent to inform the pope. They arrived in Rome on 12 March 1462, were received by the pope on 14 March and the ceremony recognizing the abrogation of the Pragmatic Sanction took place in a consistory held on 16 March. In that same consistory, Longueil was given the titular church of Sant'Eusebio.

Cardinal Longueil now fixed his residence in Rome and became a close adviser of the pope. As a result of his having left France, on 24 May 1463 the Conseil du Roi issued an order stopping all his benefices.

He participated in the papal conclave of 1464 that elected Pope Paul II. The new pope named him archpriest of St Mark's Basilica, Venice. On 1 October 1464 the pope named him papal legate to Perugia. He returned to Rome on 10 February 1468.

He died in Sutri on 19 August 1470. He was buried in St Mark's Basilica. His death was commemorated in Rouen Cathedral on 1 August until the time of the French Revolution.
