= Raoul Roussel =

French churchman

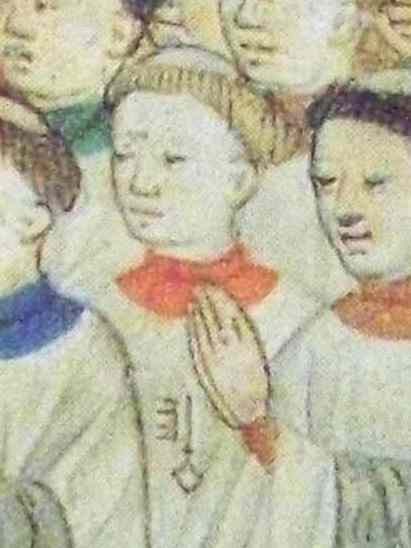
Raoul Roussel, Treasurer to Rouen Cathedral in an illumination of count of debits.

Raoul Roussel (1389–1452) was a French churchman, who played a part in the trial of Joan of Arc in 1431, and was archbishop of Rouen from 1443 to 1452.

He was born at Saultchevreuil in the diocese of Coutances, and became a doctor of canon law in 1416. At the time of the trial he was Treasurer to Rouen Cathedral.

He was an advisor both to the English king, who employed him on numerous missions, and later to the Edmund Beaufort, 1st Duke of Somerset. When Rouen, in the hands of the English and Somerset, surrendered to Charles VII of France in 1449, Roussel had influence in the negotiations, and received the French king into the city.

== Notes ==
Religious titles
Preceded by Lewis of Luxembourg	Archbishop of Rouen; 1443–1452	Succeeded by Guillaume d'Estouteville
