= Pragmatic Sanction of Bourges =

1438 Edict of Charles VII of France limiting Papal authority in France

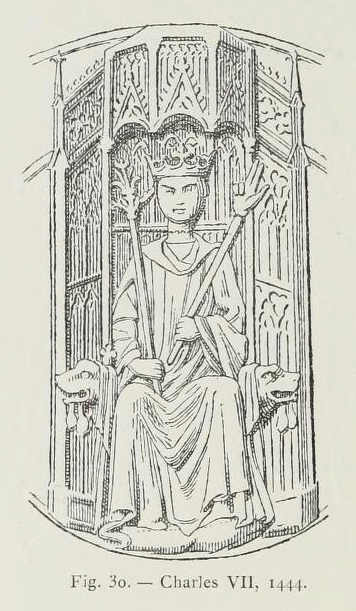
Charles VII of France in a 1444 depiction.

The Pragmatic Sanction of Bourges, issued by King Charles VII of France, on 7 July 1438, required a General Church Council, with authority superior to that of the papacy, to be held every ten years, required election rather than appointment to ecclesiastical offices, prohibited the pope from bestowing and profiting from benefices, and forbade appeals to the Roman Curia from places further than two days' journey from Rome. The Pragmatic Sanction further stipulated that interdict could not be placed on cities unless the entire community was culpable. The king accepted many of the decrees of the Council of Basel without endorsing its efforts to coerce Pope Eugene IV.

The Catholic Church of France, in the eyes of some, declared administrative independence from the church in Rome. The Catholic Church of France suppressed the payment of annates to Rome and forbade papal intervention in the appointment of French prelates. While this resulted in a loss of papal power in France, the movement of conciliarists itself was divided. In 1449, the Council of Basel was dissolved, and the Concilliar movement suffered a nearly fatal blow.

The popes, especially Pius II (r. 1458–64), lobbied the French clergy to seek the repeal of the Pragmatic Sanction, and the French crown used promises of repeal as an inducement to the papacy to embrace policies favoring its interests, especially its military campaigns in the Italian peninsula. The Pragmatic Sanction was eventually superseded by agreements made between the French crown and Rome, especially the 1516 Concordat of Bologna.

== See also ==
- Gallicanism

== Sources ==
- Ehler, Sidney Z.; Morrall, John B., eds. (1954). "IV: The Conciliar Period and the Age of Discovery". Church and State Through the Centuries: A Collection of historic documents with commentaries. Biblo and Tannen.
- Knecht, Robert J. (1982). Francis I. Cambridge: Cambridge University Press.
- Knecht, Robert J. (2007). The Valois: Kings of France 1328-1589. Bloomsbury Academic.
- Müller, Annalena (2021). From the Cloister to the State: Fontevraud and the Making of Bourbon France, 1642-1100. Taylor & Francis.
- Stieber, Joachim W. (1978). Pope Eugenius IV, the Council of Basel and the Secular and Ecclesiastical Authorities in the Empire: The Conflict Over Supreme Authority and Power in the Church. Leiden: Brill.
- Wagner, John A. (2018). Documents of the Reformation. ABC-CLIO.
