= Jean Juvénal des Ursins =

French cleric and historian

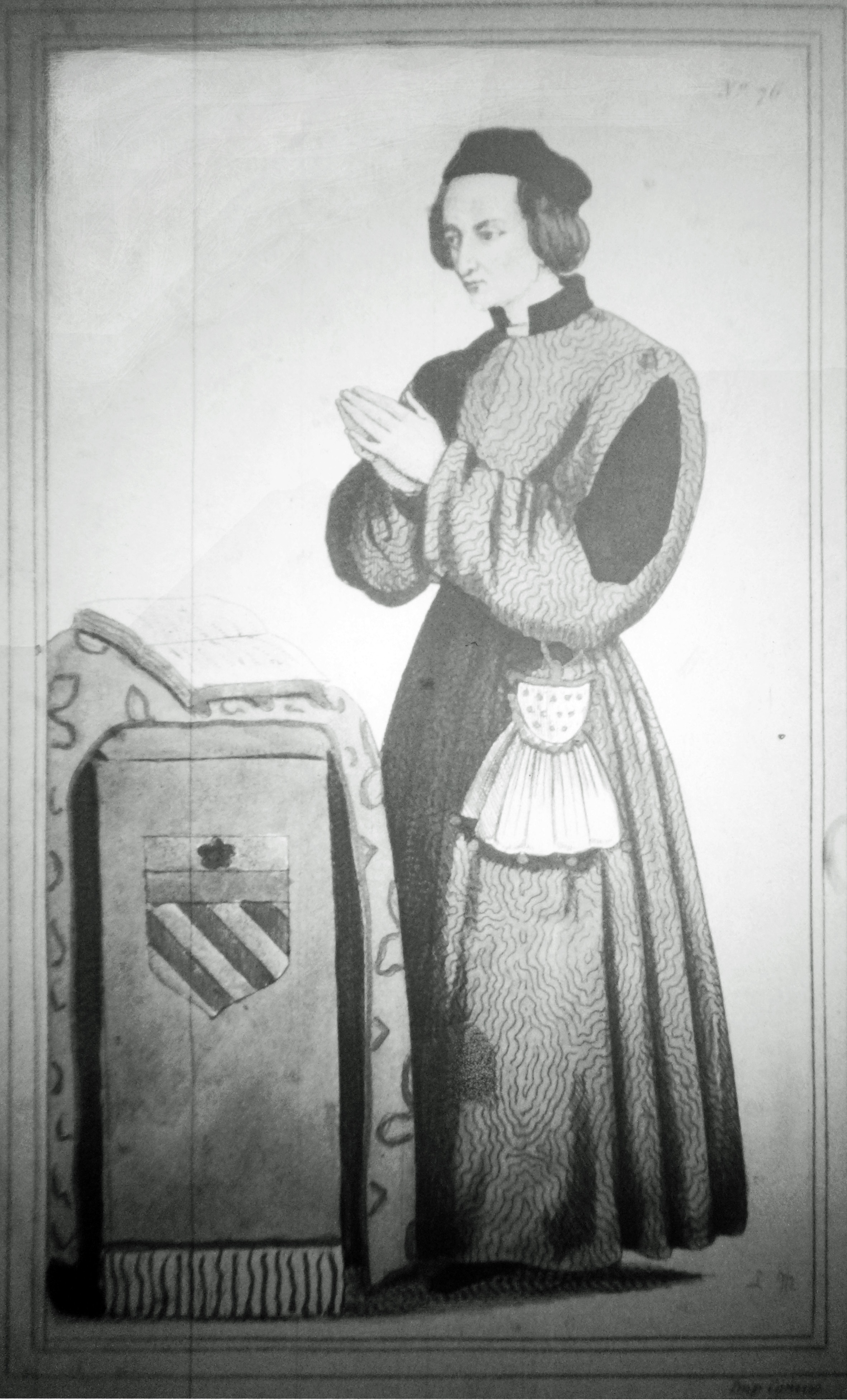

Jean (II) Juvénal des Ursins (French pronunciation: [ʒɑ̃ ʒyvenal dez‿yʁsɛ̃]; 1388–1473), the son of the royal jurist and provost of the merchants of Paris Jean Juvénal, was a French cleric and historian. He is the author of several legal treatises and clerical publications and the Histoire de Charles VI, Roy de France is attributed to him. His works serve as some of the main sources for information relating to the Armagnac-Burgundian Civil War and the final phase of the Hundred Years' War.

He served as Bishop of Beauvais from 1433 to 1444, Bishop of Laon from 1444 to 1449, and Archbishop of Reims from 1449 to his death in 1473. It was in this latter capacity that he oversaw the rehabilitation of Joan of Arc between 1452 and 1456.

He is sometimes credited as the source of the adage, "War without fire is like sausages without mustard", concerning Henry V's firing of Meaux in 1421. However, other sources claim the king himself is the real source of the quote, and Juvenal cited him.

== Sources ==
- P. S. Lewis, Ecrits Politiques De Jean Juvenal Des Ursins, Societe de l'histoire de France, C. Klincksieck, ISBN 2-252-02894-7 (2-252-02894-7)
- Famiglietti, Richard C. "Juvenal Des Ursins". in Kibler, William (ed). Medieval France: An Encyclopedia. ISBN 0-8240-4444-4
