= Guillaume Chartier (bishop) =

French bishop

- Bishop of Paris
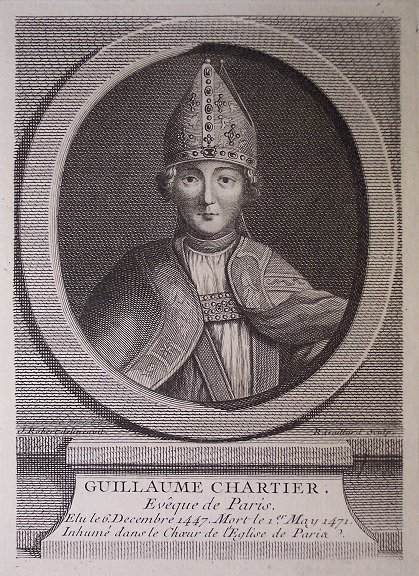
- Church: Roman Catholic
- Appointed: 6 December 1447
- Term ended: 1 May 1472
- Predecessor: Denis du Moulin
- Successor: Louis de Beaumont de la Forêt

Orders
- Consecration: 22 July 1448 by Jean Juvénal des Ursins

Personal details
- Born: c. 1386 Bayeux
- Died: 1 May 1472 Paris, France

Guillaume Chartier (c. 1386 – 1 May 1472) was a French bishop.

== Biographie ==
Born in Bayeux, Guillaume was the brother of Alain Chartier. He was appointed bishop of Paris on 6 December 1447. Twelve years later he was France's ambassador to the Council of Mantua, at which delivered a speech in Latin which lasted over two hours.

He backed cathedral chapters' rights to elect bishops against royal attempts to take over that right. During the League of the Public Weal era he joined the mécontents. He held onto his bishopric until his death, but King Louis XI recorded his hostility on Chartier's tomb - that epitaph was later replaced by a more honourable one.

== Sources ==
- Clavel de St Geniez, Histoire chrétienne des diocèses de France, de Belgique, de Savoie et des bords du Rhin, 1885
