= Raoul =

Raoul is a French variant of the male given name Ralph or Rudolph.

Raoul may also refer to:

== Given name ==
- Raoul André (1916–1992), French director and screenwriter
- Raoul Anglès (1887–1967), French politician
- Raoul Aragon, Filipino film actor
- Raoul Aslan (1886–1958), Austrian actor
- Raoul Auernheimer (1876–1948), Austrian jurist and writer
- Raoul Baicu (born 2000), Romanian footballer
- Raoul Bardac (1881–1950), French classical composer and pianist
- Raoul Barouch (1916–2006), Tunisian fencer
- Raoul Barré (1874–1932), Canadian/American cartoonist, animator, and painter
- Raoul Barrière (1928–2019), French rugby union and coach
- Raoul de Beauvais, 13th-century French poet
- Raoul Bedoc, French table tennis player
- Raoul Bellanova (born 2000), Italian footballer
- Raoul Bénard (1881–1961), French sculptor
- Raoul Bensaude (1866–1938), French-Portuguese physician
- Raoul Berger (1901–2000), American legal scholar
- Raoul Bhaneja (born 1974), English-Canadian actor, musician, writer and producer
- Raoul Billerey (1920–2010), French actor and stuntman
- Raoul Biltgen (born 1974), Luxembourgish actor and writer.
- Raoul Björkenheim (born 1956), Finnish-American jazz guitarist
- Raoul Blanchard (1877–1965), French geographer
- Raoul Bleuse (1895–1984), French politician
- Raoul de Boigne (1862–1949), French sport shooter
- Raoul Le Mouton de Boisdeffre (1839–1919), French Army general
- Raoul Borra (1896–1988), French politician
- Raoul Bortoletto (1925–2003), Italian footballer
- Raoul Bossy (1894–1975), Romanian diplomat
- Raoul Bott (1923–2005), Hungarian-American mathematician
- Raoul Boucher, French racing cyclist
- Raoul Boucke (born 1975), Surinamese-Dutch civil servant and politician
- Raoul Bova (born 1971), Italian actor
- Raoul le Breton (c. 1270–1320), grammarian and philosopher
- Raoul Bricard (1870–1943), French engineer and mathematician
- Raoul I of Brienne, Count of Eu (died 1344), French Constable
- Raoul II of Brienne, Count of Eu (1315–1350), French Constable
- Raoul Cabrol (1895–1956), French caricaturist
- Raoul Calas (1899–1978), French politician
- Raoul G. Cantero III (born 1960), Spanish-born American lawyer and judge
- Raoul de Caours (died 1354), Breton knight
- Raoul Carton (1879–1934), French philosopher
- Raoul Casadei (1937–2021), Italian bandleader, composer and musician
- Raoul Castex (1878–1968), French Navy admiral and military theorist
- Raoul Caudron (1883–1958), French football coach
- Raoul Cauvin (1938–2021), Belgian comics author
- Raoul Cédras (born 1949), Haitian military officer
- Raoul I of Clermont (bef. 1140—1191), French nobleman
- Raoul II of Clermont (c. 1245–1302), Constable of France
- Raoul Clifford, pseudonym of English composer Albert Ketèlbey (1875–1959)
- Raoul Combes (1883–1964), French botanist, plant physiologist, and science historian
- Raoul A. Cortez (1905–1971), Mexican–American media executive
- Raoul I, Lord of Coucy (c. 1134–1191), French nobleman and Crusader
- Raoul II, Lord of Coucy (died 1250), French nobleman and Crusader
- Raoul Coulon (born 1995), Vanuatuan footballer
- Raoul Courbin (1926–1950s), French footballer
- Raoul Coutard (1924–2016), French cinematographer
- Raoul Couvert (1903–1983), French ice hockey player
- Raoul Curiel (1913–2000), French archaeologist, Egyptologist and orientalist
- Raoul da Luz (1892–1988), Hong Kong lawn bowler
- Raoul Daddo-Langlois (1922–1943), British World War II flying ace
- Raoul Dandurand (1861–1942), Canadian politician
- Raoul Daufresne de la Chevalerie (1881–1967), Belgian sportsman and soldier
- Raoul Dautry (1880–1951), French engineer, business leader and politician
- Raoul d'Avranches (died 1006), French bishop
- Raoul Degryse (1912–1993), Belgian boxer
- Raoul De Keyser (1930–2012), Belgian painter
- Raoul de Navery, pseudonym of French novelist Madame Chervet (1829–1885)
- Raoul de Thuin (1890–1975), Belgian-Mexican stamp forger and dealer
- Raoul de Vitry (1895–1977), French aristocrat and business executive
- Raoul de Warren (1905–1992), French writer, historian, genealogist and lawyer
- Raoul del Mar (born 1965), Filipino physician and former politician
- Raoul Desribes (1856–1940), French Jesuit archaeologist
- Raoul Dgvareli (born 1965), Tajikistani wrestler
- Raoul Diagne (1910–2002), French footballer
- Raoul du Bisson (1812–1890), French aristocrat and adventurer
- Raoul Pene Du Bois (1914–1985), American costume and set designer
- Raoul du Gardier (1871–1952), French painter
- Raoul du Roveray (1879–1940), English badminton player
- Raoul du Toit, Zimbabwean environmentalist
- Raoul Dufy (1877–1953), French painter
- Raôul Duguay (born 1939), Canadian artist, poet, musician, and political activist
- Raoul Echard (1883–1922), French World War I flying ace
- Raoul Esseboom (born 1992), Dutch footballer
- Raoul Fahlin (born 1966), Swedish cyclist
- Raoul Felder (born 1944), American divorce lawyer and writer
- Raoul Fernandes, Canadian poet
- Raoul Auger Feuillet (c. 1660–1710), French dance notator, publisher and choreographer
- Raoul of France (c. 890–936), King of West Francia
- Raoul Heinrich Francé (1874–1943), Austro-Hungarian botanist, microbiologist and philosopher
- Raoul Franklin (1935–2021), British physicist
- Raoul Fristeau (1888–1964), French fencer
- Raoul Garrard (1897–1977), New Zealand cricketer
- Raoul de Gaucourt (c. 1370–1461), French soldier and statesman
- Raoul Gehringer (1971–2018), Austrian choir director and composer
- Raoul Giger (born 1997), Swiss footballer
- Raoul Girardet (1917–2013), French historian
- Raoul Giraudo (1932–1995), French footballer
- Raoul Glaber (985–1047), Benedictine chronicler
- Raoul de Godewaersvelde (1928–1977), French singer
- Raoul Got (1900–1955), French rugby player
- Raoul Gradis (1861–1943), French painter, composer and shipowner
- Raoul Grassilli (1924–2010), Italian actor
- Raoul Grimoin-Sanson (1860–1941), French inventor, engineer, and cinema pioneer
- Raoul Gueguen (born 1947), French modern pentathlete
- Raoul de Guînes (c. 992–1036), French nobleman
- Raoul Gunsbourg (1860–1955), Romanian opera director and composer
- Raoul Hafner (1905–1980), Austrian-born British helicopter pioneer and engineer
- Raoul Hausmann (1886–1971), Austrian artist and writer
- Raoul Hedebouw (born 1977), Belgian politician
- Raoul Heertje (born 1963), Dutch stand-up comedian
- Raoul Heide (1888–1978), Norwegian fencer
- Raoul Heilbronner (died 1941), German art dealer
- Raoul Henar (born 1972), Dutch footballer
- Raoul Henkart (1907–1955), Belgian fencer
- Raoul Hoffman, Hungarian-American aerospace engineer
- Raoul de Houdenc (c. 1165–c. 1230), French author
- Raoul Hunter (1926–2018), Canadian sculptor and caricaturist
- Raoul Hurtubise (1882–1955), Canadian politician
- Raoul Hyman (born 1996), South African racing driver
- Raoul Hynckes (1893–1973), Dutch painter
- Raoul Jarry (1885–1930), Canadian politician
- Raoul Jobin (1906–1974), Canadian operatic tenor
- Raoul Josset (1892–1957), French-born American sculptor
- Raoul Kenne (born 1994), Cameroonian footballer
- Raoul Koczalski (1884–1948), Polish pianist and composer
- Raoul Kopelman (1933–2023), American chemist and nanotechnologist
- Raoul Korner (born 1974), Austrian basketball coach
- Raoul Korty (1889–1944), Austrian-Jewish journalist and photography collector
- Raoul Kouakou (born 1980), Ivorian former footballer
- Raoul Kraushaar (1908–2001), American composer
- Raoul Kurvitz (born 1961), Estonian artist, musician and actor
- Raoul Weston La Barre (1911–1996), American anthropologist, ethnobotanist, and drug researcher
- Raoul Albert La Roche (1889–1965), Swiss banker and art collector
- Raoul Lachenal (1885–1956), French potter
- Raoul Lambert (born 1944), Belgian footballer
- Raoul Lamourdedieu (1877–1953), French sculptor and medalist
- Raoul Larson (born 1984), Namibian rugby union player
- Raoul Last (born 2000), Dutch footballer
- Raoul Laparra (1876–1943), French composer
- Raoul Lefèvre, 15th-century French writer
- Raoul Le Mat (1875–1947), American film director and ice hockey coach
- Raoul Lesueur (1912–1981), French cyclist
- Raoul Lévy (1922–1966), French film producer, writer and director
- Raoul Lignon (1894–1973), French modern pentathlete
- Raoul Loé (born 1989), Cameroonian-French footballer
- Raoul Lufbery (1885–1918), French flying ace in World War I
- Raoul I of Lusignan (1160s–1219), French nobleman and Crusader
- Raoul II of Lusignan (1200–1246), French nobleman
- Raoul Magrin-Vernerey (1892–1964), French general
- Raoul Mal (born 2000), Romanian footballer
- Raoul Manselli (1917–1984), Italian historian
- Raoul Manuel (born 1994), Filipino youth activist and politician
- Raoul Marco (1892–1971), French actor
- Raoul Martinez (1876–1974), French artist
- Raoul of Mérencourt (died 1225), Latin Patriarch of Jerusalem
- Raoul Mesnier du Ponsard (1848–1914), Portuguese engineer
- Raoul Meyer (1892–1970), French businessman and Resistance fighter
- Raoul Middleman (1935–2021), American painter
- Raoul Millais (1901–1999), English painter and sportsman
- Raoul Minot (1893–1945), French photographer
- Raoul Moat (1973–2010), English fugitive and gunman
- Raoul Mollet (1912–2002), Belgian modern pentathlete
- Raoul Moretti (1893–1954), French film score composer
- Raoul Mulder, Australian ornithologist and evolutionary ecologist
- Raoul Naroll (1920–1985), Canadian-American anthropologist
- Raoul Nehme (born 1956), Lebanese Minister of Economy and Trade
- Raoul II de Nesle (died 1160), French nobleman
- Raoul III de Nesle (died 1235), French nobleman
- Raoul de Neuville (died 1221), French cardinal, bishop, and diplomat
- Raoul Ngadrira (born 1989), Belgian footballer
- Raoul Nordling (1882–1962), Swedish-French businessman and diplomat
- Raoul Owens (born 1994), British racing driver
- Raoul Palmer (1904–1985), French gynecologist
- Raoul Palmgren (1912–1995), Finnish writer
- Raoul Pantin (1943–2015), Trinidad and Tobago journalist, editor, poet and playwright
- Raoul Paoli (1887–1960), French athlete and actor
- Raoul Peeters (born 1947), Belgian football manager
- Raoul Peck (born 1953), Haitian filmmaker
- Raoul Péret (1870–1942), French lawyer and politician
- Raoul Petouille (1894–1978), French racing cyclist
- Raoul Petretta (born 1997), German/Italian footballer
- Raoul-Pierre Pictet (1846–1929), Swiss physicist
- Raoul Pleskow (1930–2022), Austrian-born American composer
- Raoul Ploquin (1900–1992), French film producer, production manager and screenwriter
- Raoul Plus (1882–1958), French Jesuit priest and author
- Raoul Poliakin (1917–1981), Egyptian-American orchestral arranger and conductor
- Raoul Ponchon (1848–1937), French poet
- Raoul Poulin (1900–1975), Canadian politician
- Raoul Prandi (born 1969), French handball player
- Raoul Pugno (1852–1914), French composer, teacher, organist and pianist
- Raoul Rémy (1919–2002), French cyclist
- Raoul Retzer (1919–1974), Austrian actor
- Raoul Rigault (1846–1871), French journalist and revolutionary
- Raoul A. Robinson (1928–2014), British-Canadian botanist
- Raoul Rodriguez (born 1963), American rower
- Raoul Ronsmans (born 1950), Belgian field hockey player
- Raoul Roussel (1389–1452), French churchman and Archbishop of Rouen
- Raoul de Saint-Omer (died 1220), Prince of Galilee
- Raoul Salan (1899–1984), French Army general
- Raoul Sarrazin (1938–2020), Canadian boxer
- Raoul Savoy (born 1973), Spanish-Swiss football coach
- Raoul Schrott (born 1964), Austrian poet, writer, literary critic, translator and broadcast personality
- Raoul Serres (1881–1971), French illustrator and printmaker
- Raoul Servais (1928–2023), Belgian filmmaker, animator, and comics artist
- Raoul Shungu (born 1958), Congolese football manager
- Raoul Sinier, French graphic designer and musician
- Raoul de Soissons (c. 1210–1270), French nobleman and Crusader
- Raoul Șorban (1912–2006), Romanian writer and artist
- Raoul II Sores (died 1282), French Marshal and Crusader
- Raoul Stojsavljevic (1887–1930), Austro-Hungarian World War I flying ace
- Raoul Suhaimi (born 2005), Singaporean footballer
- Raoul Taisson, 10th-century Norman warrior
- Raoul Thiercelin (1898–1988), French rugby union player
- Raoul Toché (1850–1895), French playwright and journalist
- Raoul II of Tosny (1027–1102), Norman nobleman
- Raoul III of Tosny (1079–1126), Norman nobleman
- Raoul Tranchirer, pseudonym of German writer, poet, and artist Ror Wolf (1932–2020)
- Raoul Trujillo (born 1955), American actor, dancer, choreographer and theater director
- Raoul of Turenne or Saint-Raoul, archbishop of Bourges, 840–866
- Raoul Ubac (1910–1985), French painter, sculptor, photographer and engraver
- Raoul Üksvärav (1928–2016), Estonian economist and politician
- Raoul III of Valois (died 1038), French count
- Raoul IV of Valois (c. 1025–1074), French count
- Raoul Van Caenegem (1927–2018), Belgian legal historian
- Raoul Van Overstraeten (1885–1977), Belgian general
- Raoul Vaneigem (born 1934), Belgian writer
- Raoul de Varneville (died 1191), Lord Chancellor of England and Bishop of Lisieux
- Raoul Vazquez (born 1997), Spanish singer-songwriter and musician
- Raoul (founder of Vaucelles Abbey) or Saint Raoul
- Raoul Verlet (1857–1923), French sculptor and art professor
- Raoul I of Vermandois (died 1152), French count
- Raoul Villain (1885–1936), French nationalist and assassin of Jean Jaurès
- Raoul Gregory Vitale (1928–2003), Syrian musicologist
- Raoul Voss (born 1983), German football coach
- Raoul Wallenberg (1912–disappeared 1945), Swedish humanitarian
- Raoul Walsh (1887–1980), American film director
- Raoul Warocqué (1870–1917), Belgian industrialist
- Raoul Weckbecker (1898–1978), Luxembourgian bobsledder and skier
- Raoul Weil (born 1959), Swiss banker
- Raoul Weiler (1938–2019), Belgian engineer
- Raoul White (born 1972), Dutch politician
- Raoul Whitfield (1896–1945), American fiction writer

== Surname ==
- Raoul (Byzantine family), Byzantine aristocratic family of Norman descent
  - Alexios Raoul (died c. 1258), Byzantine general
  - John Raoul Petraliphas (died c. 1274), Byzantine noble and military commander
  - Manuel Raoul, Byzantine official
  - Manuel Komnenos Raoul, Byzantine aristocrat and official, son of Alexios Raoul
  - Theodora Raoulaina (c. 1240–1300), Byzantine noblewoman, nun and scholar
- Alfred Raoul (1938–1999), President of the Republic of the Congo
- Dale Raoul (born 1955), American actress
- Daniel Raoul (born 1941), French politician
- Émilienne Raoul (born 1945), Congolese politician, wife of Alfred Raoul
- Étienne Fiacre Louis Raoul (1815–1852), French naval surgeon and naturalist
- Fanny Raoul (1771–1833), French feminist writer, journalist, philosopher and essayist; sister of Jean-Marie Raoul
- Jean-Marie Raoul (1766–1837), French lawyer, musician
- Kwame Raoul (born 1964), American politician and 42nd Attorney General of Illinois
- Max Raoul (c.1770–1839), French playwright
- Ménaïc Raoul, Canadian film and commercial producer

== Fictional characters ==
- Bushman (character) (full name Raoul Bushman), a Marvel Comics character
- Raoul de Cambrai, title character of a French epic poem
- Raoul CaRoule from the 2011 animated film Cars 2
- Raoul, Vicomte de Bragelonne, son of Athos in The Vicomte of Bragelonne: Ten Years Later
- Viscount Raoul de Chagny, character in The Phantom of the Opera
- Raoul Diop, son of protagonist Assane Diop in the Netflix French TV series Lupin
- Raoul Duke, a recurring character and author surrogate of writer Hunter S. Thompson
- Raoul of Goldenlake, a character in the works of Tamora Pierce
- Raoul Robideux, one of the main characters of the French–Canadian web series Tetes a Claques
- Raoul Silva, the main antagonist in the 2012 film Skyfall, played by Javier Bardem
- Raoul, one of the main characters of the 2010 animation A Monster in Paris

== Places ==
- Raoul, Georgia, United States
- Raoul Island in the Pacific Ocean
- Cape Raoul, Tasmania

== Other ==
- Raoul and the Kings of Spain, a 1995 studio album by British group Tears for Fears
  - "Raoul and the Kings of Spain" (song), the title track from the album
- Super Raoul, an LP by Fishtank Ensemble
- "Raoul" (song), a 2006 single by indie band The Automatic
  - Raoul (EP), an EP by The Automatic
- Eating Raoul, 1982 American black comedy film
  - Eating Raoul (musical), a 1992 musical
- An Evening with Raoul, Philippine variety/talk show hosted by Raoul Imbach

== See also ==
- Raul, a cognate of this name
- Raoul-Duval, a French surname
