= Ralph =

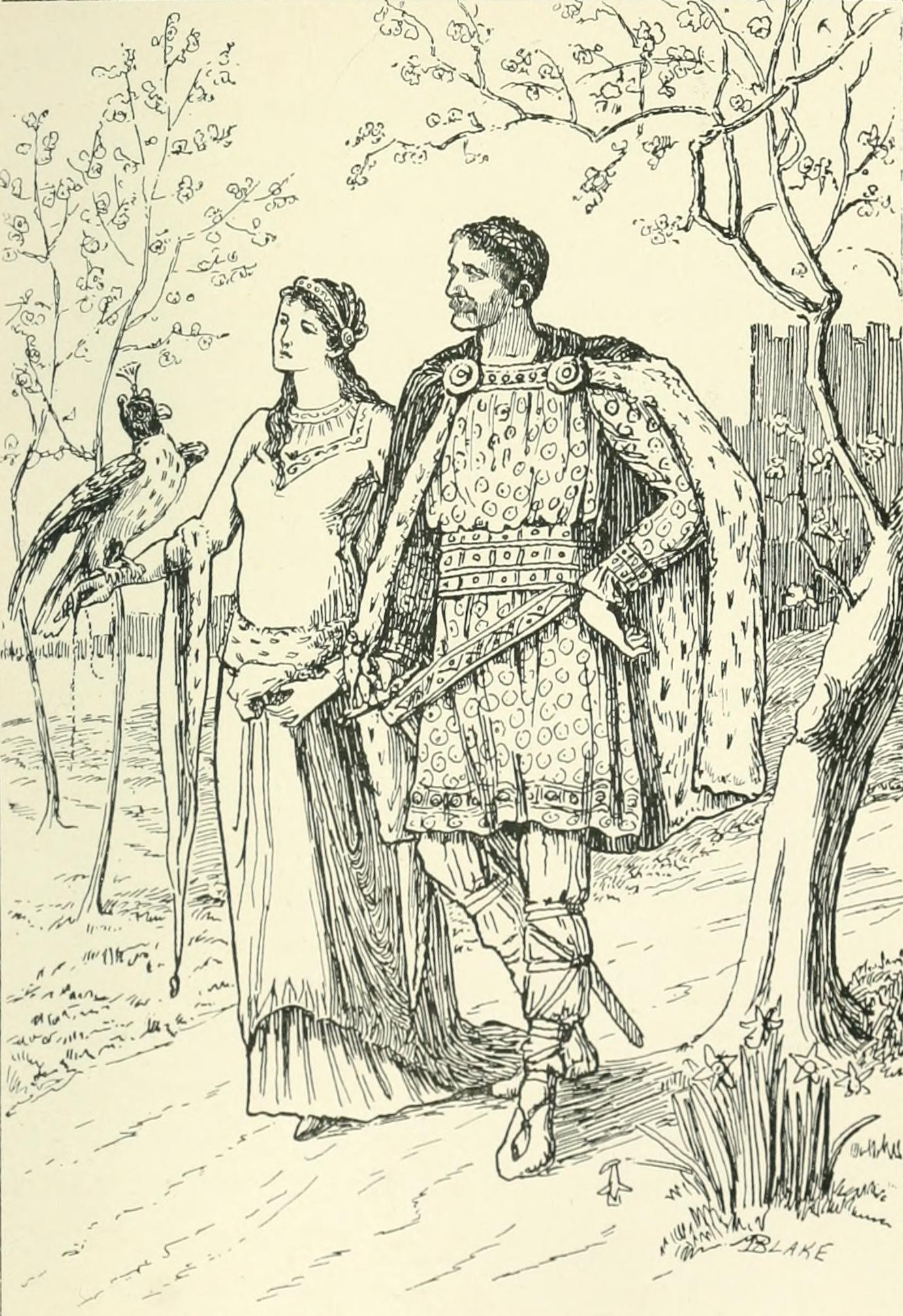
- Ralph de Gael
- Gender: Male

Origin
- Origin: Old Norse, Old English
- Meaning: "Wolf counsel"

Other names
- Related names: Raul, Raoul, Ralphie, Rudolph
- See also: Robert, Roland, Roger, Rose, Roderick, Rodney, Raymond

Ralph (pronounced /rælf/ or /reɪf/) is a male name of English origin, derived from the Old English Rædwulf and Old High German Radulf, cognate with the Old Norse Raðulfr (rað "counsel" and ulfr "wolf").

The most common forms are:

- Ralph, the common variant form in English, which takes either of the given pronunciations.
- Rafe, variant form which is less common; this spelling is always pronounced /reɪf/.
- Raif, a very rare variant.
- Ralf, the traditional variant form in Dutch, German, Swedish, and Polish.
- Ralfs, the traditional variant form in Latvian.
- Raoul, the traditional variant form in French.
- Raúl, the traditional variant form in Spanish.
- Raul, the traditional variant form in Portuguese and Italian.
- Raül, the traditional variant form in Catalan.
- Rádhulbh, the traditional variant form in Irish.
- Rauf, a Turkish variant and the name of Rauf Denktas. He was the founder of Northern Cyprus.

== First name ==
=== Middle Ages ===
- Ralph the Timid (died 1057), pre-Conquest Norman earl of Hereford, England
- Ralph de Gael (1042–1096), the Earl of East Anglia (Norfolk and Suffolk) and Lord of Gaël and Montfort, leader of the Revolt of the Earls
- Ralph d'Escures (died 1122), Abbot of Séez, Bishop of Rochester and Archbishop of Canterbury
- Ralph (administrator) (died 1174), Bishop of Bethlehem
- Ralph de Warneville (died 1191), twentieth Lord Chancellor of England as well as later Bishop of Lisieux in Normandy
- Ralph de Diceto (c. 1120 – c. 1202), archdeacon of Middlesex, dean of St Paul's Cathedral (from c. 1180), and author of two chronicles, the Abbreviationes chronicorum and the Ymagines historiarum
- Ralph Neville (died 1244), Archbishop of Canterbury
- Ralph de Maidstone (died 1245), Bishop of Hereford
- Ralph Baldock (died 1313), Bishop of London and Lord Chancellor of England in 1307
- Ralph Stratford (c. 1300 – 1354), Bishop of London
- Ralph de Neville, 1st Earl of Westmorland (1364–1425), English peer
- Ralph Percy (died 1464), English knight
- Saint Ralph Sherwin (died 1581), Catholic saint and English martyr

=== Modern world ===
- Ralph Abercromby (1734–1801), Scottish soldier and politician
- Ralph Abernathy (1927–1990), American civil rights leader and minister
- Ralph Abraham (mathematician) (1936–2024), American mathematician
- Ralph Abraham (politician) (born 1954), American politician
- Ralph Adams Cram (1863–1942), American architect
- Ralf Akoto (born 1974), German judoka
- Ralph Allen (disambiguation)
- Ralph Babet (born 1983), Australian politician
- Ralph Backstrom (1937–2021), Canadian hockey player
- Ralph Bakshi (born 1938), American director of animated and live-action films
- Ralph Barbieri (1945–2020), American sports radio personality
- Ralph Henry Barbour, American novelist, primarily sports fiction for boys
- Ralf Baartmans, Dutch DJ and music producer known as Ralvero
- Ralph Bass (1911–1997), American record producer and talent scout
- Ralph Beard (1927–2007), American basketball player
- Ralf Becker (born 1970), German footballer, coach and administrator
- Ralph F. Beermann (1912–1977), American politician
- Ralph Bellamy (1904–1991), American actor
- Ralf Bendix (1924–2014), German singer
- Ralph Beebe Blackman (1904–1990), American mathematician and engineer
- Ralph Blane (1914–1995), American composer, lyricist and performer
- Ralph Blegborough (1769–1827), English physician
- Ralf Bochröder (born 1940), German marathon runner
- Ralph Branca (1926–2016), American baseball player
- Ralph Brinkhaus (born 1968), German politician
- Ralph Brown, English actor and writer
- Ralph Bunche (1903–1971), American political scientist, academic and diplomat
- Ralph Burns (1922–2001), American songwriter, bandleader, composer, conductor, arranger and bebop pianist
- Ralph Byrd (1909–1952), American actor
- Ralph Carmichael, pop music composer and arranger
- Ralph Chaplin (1887–1961), American writer, artist and labor activist
- Ralph Chase (1902–1989), American football player
- Ralph Coates (1946–2010), English football player
- Ralph Louis Cohen (born 1952), American mathematician
- Ralph Connor (1860–1937), Canadian novelist and church leader
- Ralph Connor (scientist) (1907–1990), American chemist
- Ralph Cook (born 1944), American jurist from Alabama
- Ralph Cooperman (1927–2009), British fencer
- Ralph D. Cornell (1890–1972), American landscape architect
- Ralph Cudworth (1572/3–1624), English scholar, cleric and theologian, father of Ralph
- Ralph Cudworth (1617–1688), English philosopher, theologian, leader of the Cambridge Platonists
- Ralph DeLoach (1957–2022), American football player
- Ralph Della-Volpe (1923–2017), American painter, teacher
- Ralph Doolan (1933–2018), American politician
- Ralph Drollinger (born 1954), American basketball player and clergyman
- Ralph Earl (1751–1801), American portrait painter
- Ralph Earle, several people
- Ralph Earnhardt (1928–1973), American racing driver and patriarch of the Earnhardt racing family
- Ralph Edwards (disambiguation)
- Ralph Ellison (1913–1994), American novelist, literary critic and scholar
- Ralph Ely (1820–1883), American politician and military officer from Michigan
- Ralph Waldo Emerson (1803—1882), American essayist, lecturer and poet
- Ralph Emery (1933–2022), American country music disc jockey, radio and television host
- Ralph Fiennes (born 1962), English actor and director
- Ralph Fletcher (1780–1851), English surgeon and writer
- Ralph Perry Forbes (1940–2018), American neo-Nazi and Arkansas political candidate
- Ralph Foster (disambiguation)
- Ralph A. Gamble (1885–1959), American politician from New York
- Ralph G. Kevorkian, co-pilot in TWA Flight 800 accident in 1996
- Ralph Goldstein (fencer) (1913–1997), American fencer
- Ralph E. Gomory (born 1929), American applied mathematician and IBM executive
- Ralph Haben (1941–2026), American attorney, lobbyist, and politician
- Ralph Heywood (1921–2007), American football player
- Ralph Holley (born 1999), American football player
- Ralph Horween (1896–1997), American football player
- Ralf Hütter (born 1946), German musician
- Ralph Ince (1887–1937), American pioneer film actor, director and screenwriter
- Ralph Ineson (born 1969), English actor, narrator, and writer
- Ralph Isselhardt (1910–1972), American football player
- Ralph B. Ives (1873–1934), American businessman
- Ralph Jackson (disambiguation)
- Ralph Jarvis (born 1965), American football player
- Ralph Jodice, American Air force general
- Ralph Johnson (disambiguation)
- Ralph Jones (1880–1951), American football and basketball coach
- Ralph Kaminski (born 1990), Polish singer-songwriter
- Ralph Kerr (1891–1941), British naval officer
- Ralph Kiner (1922–2014), American baseball player
- Ralph Klein (1942–2013), Canadian politician from Alberta
- Ralph Klein (basketball) (1931–2008), Israeli basketball player and coach
- Ralph Knibbs (born 1964), British rugby union player
- Ralph Kuncl, American neurologist and academic
- Ralph Lauren (born 1939), American fashion designer
- Ralph Maxwell Lewis (1904–1987), American Rosicrucian
- Ralph Leycester (1763–1835), English politician
- Ralph Liguori (1926–2020), American racing driver
- Ralph Lownie (1924–2007), British judge
- Ralph Macchio (born 1961), American actor
- Ralph Malone (born 1964), American football player
- Ralph McQuarrie (1929–2012), American conceptual designer and illustrator, noted for his work in the Star Wars trilogy
- Ralph Michael (1907–1994), English actor
- Ralf Moeller (born 1959), German actor
- Ralph Morgan (1883–1956), American actor
- Ralph Morgan (rugby) (c.1920–2009), Welsh rugby player
- Ralph Morton (1896–1985), puisne judge of the High Court of Southern Rhodesia
- Ralph Nader (born 1934), American political activist, author, lecturer and attorney
- Ralf Nentwich (born 1982), German politician
- Ralph Nichols (1910–2001), English badminton player
- Ralph Nichols (American football) (1874–1949), American politician and college football player and coach
- Ralph Northam (born 1959), American politician
- Ralph O. Olson (1902–1955), American justice from Washington state
- Ralph Penland (1953–2014), American jazz drummer
- Ralph Percy, 12th Duke of Northumberland (born 1956), English landowner
- Ralph "Bucky" Phillips (born 1962), American fugitive
- Ralf Plötner (born 1983), German politician
- Ralf Rangnick (born 1958), German football coach and manager
- Ralph Recto (born 1964), Filipino politician
- Ralph David Richardson (1902–1983), English actor
- Ralph Sadler (1507–1587), English diplomat, Privy Councillor, Secretary of State and Chancellor of the Duchy of Lancaster
- Ralph Salerno (1925-2003), New York police officer, author and recognized expert on the American mafia
- Ralph Savarese (born 1960s), American academic, writer, poet, and activist
- Ralph Schoenman, American left-wing activist
- Ralf Schumacher (born 1975), German racing driver
- Ralph Sheheen (born 1964), motorsport broadcaster
- Ralph Shortey, (born 1982) American politician
- Ralph Siegel (born 1945), German record producer and songwriter
- Ralph Smart, (1908–2001) British film producer and director
- Ralf Socher (born 1967), Canadian alpine skier
- Ralph Stanley (1927–2016), American musician
- Ralph Terry (1936–2022), American baseball player and golfer
- Ralph Dundas Tindal, Dutch military leader
- Ralph Towner (1940–2026), American multi-instrumentalist, composer and bandleader
- Ralph E. Turner (1893–1964), American historian
- Ralph Vaughan Williams (1872–1958), English composer
- Ralph A. Vaughn (1907–2000), American academic, architect and film set designer
- Ralph Waite (1928–2014), American actor and political activist
- Ralph Waller (born 1945), Methodist Minister, former Principal of Harris-Manchester College, Oxford, former Pro-Vice Chancellor of Oxford University
- Ralph Wammack (1867–1945), American politician from Missouri
- Ralph Webb (American football) (born 1994), American football player
- Ralph Welker (1911-1981), American politician
- Ralph Wilson (1918–2014), American football team founder and owner
- Ralf Wolter (1926–2022), German actor
- Ralph Yarborough (1903–1996), American politician from Texas
- Ralph Young (disambiguation)
- Ralph Young (singer) (1918–2008), American singer and actor

== Surname ==
- Bo Ralph (born 1945), Swedish linguist
- Brian Ralph (born 1973), American cartoonist
- Caleb Ralph (born 1977), New Zealand rugby union footballer
- Damani Ralph (born 1980), Jamaican football player
- David Ralph (born 1972), Scottish field hockey forward
- Dicky Ralph (1908–1989), Welsh international rugby player
- Elena Ralph (born 1984), Miss Israel 2005
- Elsie Reasoner Ralph (1878–1913), first female war correspondent in US history
- Francis James Ralph (1892–1918), British World War I aerial observer flying ace
- Glencora Ralph (born 1988), Australian water polo player
- Hanna Ralph (1888–1978), German actress
- J. Ralph (born 1975), American composer, singer/songwriter and producer
- Josh Ralph (athlete) (born 1991), Australian athlete
- James Ralph (died 1762), American-born English political writer, historian and reviewer
- James Ralph (cricketer) (born 1975), English cricketer
- Jessie Ralph (1864–1944), American actress
- Kate Ralph (born mid-19th century), Welsh composer and pianist
- Kharis Ralph (born 1992), Canadian former ice dancer
- Konnor Ralph (born 2003), American freestyle skier
- Mark Ralph (field hockey) (born 1980), Scottish field hockey player
- Michael Ralph (born c.1963), American actor and comedian
- Nathan Ralph (born 1993), English footballer
- Richard Ralph (born 1946), British ambassador
- Richard Ralph (Missouri politician), American politician, Missouri senator
- Shea Ralph (born 1978), American basketball player and coach
- Sheryl Lee Ralph (born 1956), American actress and singer
- Toby Ralph, Australian public relations consultant

== Fictional characters ==
- Ralph Cifaretto, on The Sopranos
- Ralph Furley, on Three's Company
- Ralph Kramden, portrayed by Jackie Gleason on The Honeymooners
- Ralph Malph, on Happy Days
- Ralph Wiggum, on The Simpsons
- Wreck-It Ralph, the title character of the 2012 Disney computer-animated film Wreck-It Ralph

== See also ==
- Ralphs (surname), people with this surname
- Ralphs, a supermarket chain in Southern California, USA
- Ralphie, a related name
- Radulf (disambiguation)
- Rafe (given name)
- Raul and its French cognate Raoul (disambiguation)
- Rudolph
- ralph the ???
