= Rauf =

Rauf or Rawuf (Arabic: رَؤُوف ra’ūf or rawūf) is an Arabic male given name or surname which is a noun and the exaggerated form of the name Raif (or Raef) meaning "kind, affectionate, benign", "sympathetic, merciful" or compassionate.

The name comes from the Arabic verb ra’afa (رَأَفَ) "to have compassion for, have mercy upon, be merciful toward".

However, the name Rauf is an exaggerated form and Raif is an agent noun which is also exaggerated in nature.

The name is also one of the names of Allah, al-Ra'uf or commonly "Ar-Ra'uf/ Rawuf", meaning "the Kind, the Pitying" or "Most Kind, the Ever-Compassionate".

== Surname ==
- Abdul Rauf (anti-Taliban cleric), Afghan cleric
- Abdul Rauf (Taliban governor) (1981–2015), Taliban politician
- Abdur Rauf (cricketer) (born 1978), Pakistani cricketer
- Asad Rauf (1956–2022), Pakistani cricketer
- Atif Rauf (born 1964), Pakistani cricketer
- Ayesha Rauf (1914-1992), Sri Lankan educator and politician
- Bulent Rauf (1911–1987), Turkish-British mystic, spiritual teacher, translator and author
- Faiza Rauf (1923–1994), Egyptian princess and a member of the Muhammad Ali Dynasty
- Feisal Abdul Rauf (born 1948), American Sufi imam, author, and activist
- Haris Rauf (born 1993), Pakistani cricketer
- Javeria Rauf (born 1989), Pakistani cricketer
- John Rauf, English politician
- Mahmoud Abdul-Rauf (born 1969), American basketball player
- Onjali Q. Raúf (born 1981), English author and human rights campaigner
- Rana Abdul Rauf (born 1953), Pakistani politician
- Rashid Rauf (1981–2008), alleged Al-Qaeda operative

== Given name ==
- Rauf Rashid Abd al-Rahman (born 1941), Iraqi judge
- Rauf Adigozalov (1940–2002), Azerbaijani violinist and singer
- Rauf Aliyev (born 1989), Azerbaijani football player
- Rauf Ceylan (born 1976), German sociologist and author of Kurdish descent
- Rauf Denktaş (1924–2012), first president of Northern Cyprus
- Rauf Hasağası (1900–1992), Turkish sprinter
- Rauf Huseynli (born 2000), Azerbaijani football player
- Rauf Khalid (1957–2011), Pakistani actor
- Rauf Khalilov (born 1981), Azerbaijani film director
- Rauf Klasra, Pakistani journalist
- Rauf Lala (born 1970), Pakistani actor
- Rauf Mamedov (born 1988), Azerbaijani chess player
- Rauf Olaniyan (born 1960), Nigerian politician
- Rauf Orbay (1881–1964), Turkish politician
- Rauf Abu Al-Seoud (1915–1982), Egyptian diver
- Rauf Siddiqui (born 1961), Pakistani politician
- Rauf Yekta (1871–1935), Turkish musician

== See also ==
- Rauf & Faik, Russian trap duo
- MV Karadeniz Powership Rauf Bey, Liberia-flagged Turkish powership
- Shahid Mohammad Rauf, a village in Beygom Qaleh Rural District, in the Central District of Naqadeh County, West Azerbaijan Province, Iran
- Raouf
