= Rouf =

Rouf may refer to:

- Rouf, Athens, a neighbourhood of Athens in Greece
- Rouf F.C., a Greek football club
- Abdur Rouf (judge), a Bangladeshi judge
- Md Abdur Rouf, a Bangladeshi kabaddi player
- Munshi Abdur Rouf, a recipient of the Bir Sreshtho military award

== See also ==
- Raouf
- Rauf
- Roof (disambiguation)
