= Raef =

Raef is a male given name.

== Arabic ==
Raif, Raaif or Raef (Arabic: رَائِف rā’if) is an Arabic male given name meaning "kind, compassionate, affectionate, benign" or "sympathetic, merciful". The name comes from the Arabic verb ra’afa (رَأَفَ) "to have compassion for, have mercy upon, be merciful toward" and stems from it the noun ra’ūf or rawūf (رَؤُوفَ) which is also used as the male given name Rauf.

However, the name Rauf is an exaggerated form and Raif is an agent noun which is also exaggerated in nature.

Other written variants are Ra'ef, Rayif or Raefe.

- Raef (singer) (born 1982), Egyptian-American singer, songwriter
- Raef al-Maarri, officer in the Syrian Army
- Raif Badawi (born 1982), Saudi Arabian blogger and activist, sometimes transliterated "Raef Badawi"
- Raef al Hasan Rafa (born 1986), Bangladeshi musician

== English ==
It may a variant spelling of Rafe (/reɪf/ RAYF), an English name for a male, of Old Norse origin (meaning "counsel of the wolf" or "wise wolf"), derived from Raðulfr (rað "counsel" + ulfr "wolf") through Old English Rædwulf.

- Raef LaFrentz (born 1979), American professional basketball power forward and center
- Raef Bjayou (born 1980), British entrepreneur and television presenter

== See also ==
- Ralph (name)
- Radulf (disambiguation)
