= Raul =

- Gender: Male

Origin
- Origin: Latin adaptation of Ralph.
- Region of origin: Iberia, Latin America, other Lusofonia Portuguese, and Spanish-speaking areas, Caucasus

Other names
- Related names: Raoul, Ralph, Rudolph.

Raul, Raúl, Raül, and Raüll are forms of a common first name in Italian, Portuguese, Romanian, Spanish, Galician, Asturian, Basque, Aragonese, and Catalan. The name is cognate of the Anglo-Germanic given name Ralph or Rudolph and the French Raoul, and is derived from Old English Rædwulf through Radulf. The name is usually spelled "Raul" in Portuguese, Italian, and Romanian; "Raúl" in Spanish; and "Raül" or "Raüll" in Catalan.

Raul is also a popular but unrelated masculine name in Azerbaijani and Abkhaz. It is thought of to be a local variation of Rahullah or Ruhullah, meaning "God is kind" and "spirit of God" in Arabic, respectively.

== People with the name ==
- Raoul (founder of Vaucelles Abbey) (d. 1152), also known as Saint Raul
- Raul (entertainer) (born 2003), Japanese singer and entertainer
- Raúl Acosta (born 1962), Colombian road cyclist
- Raúl Alfonsín (1927–2009), former President of Argentina (1983–89)
- Raúl Albiol (born 1985), Spanish footballer
- Raul Amaya (born 1986), American mixed martial artist
- Raúl Baena (born 1989), Spanish association football player
- Raul Boesel (born 1957), Brazilian race car driver
- Raul Carrion (born 1945), Brazilian historian and politician
- Raúl Casal Ribeiro (1887–1956), former Vice President of Paraguay (1932-36)
- Raúl Castañeda (born 1982), Mexican boxer
- Raúl Castro (born 1931), First Secretary of the Communist Party of Cuba, brother of Fidel Castro
- Raúl Castronovo (1949–2026), Argentine footballer
- Raul Cayres (born 1999), Brazilian politician
- Raúl Correia (born 1993), Angolan footballer
- Raúl Diago (born 1965), Cuban volleyball player
- Raul Amaya (born 1986), American mixed martial artist
- Raúl De Molina, American television personality
- Raul Di Blasio (born 1949), Argentine pianist
- Raúl Esparza (born 1970), Cuban-American actor and singer
- Raúl Fuentes Cuenca (born 1975), Spanish pop singer
- Raul Geller (born 1936), Peruvian-Israeli footballer
- Raúl Giménez (born 1950), Argentine opera singer
- Raúl González (born 1977), Spanish footballer, better known mononymously
- Raúl González Robles (born 1991), Spanish footballer
- Raúl González de la Vega (born 1961/62), Mexican politician
- Raúl Grijalva (1948–2025), American politician and activist
- Raúl Ibañez (born 1972), Cuban American baseball player
- Raúl Jiménez (born 1991), Mexican footballer
- Raúl Juliá (1940–1994), Puerto Rican actor
- Raul Jungmann (1952–2026), Brazilian business consultant and politician
- Raul Khajimba, Prime Minister of Abkhazia
- Raul Kivilo (born 1973), Estonian archer
- Raul Mabanglo, Filipino politician
- Raul Mälk (born 1952), Estonian diplomat and politician
- Raul Malo (1965–2025), American singer, songwriter, guitarist, and producer
- Raul Meel (born 1941), Estonian artist and concrete poet
- Raul Mendes da Rocha (born 1964), Brazilian footballer
- Raúl Mesa (born 1982), Spanish beach volleyball player
- Raúl Montaña (born 1971), Colombian road cyclist
- Raul Plassman (born 1944), Brazilian football goalkeeper and TV commentator
- Raul Pont (born 1944), Brazilian historian and politician
- Raúl Prebisch (1901–1986), Argentine economist
- Raul Rebane (born 1953), Estonian journalist and communication consultant
- Raul Renter (1920–1992), Estonian economist and chess player
- Raul Roco (1941–2005), Philippine politician
- Raúl Roa García, Cuban diplomat, the Foreign Minister of Cuba from 1959 to 1976
- Raúl Ruidíaz (born 1990), Peruvian footballer
- Raúl Ruiz (director) (1941–2011), Chilean director and filmmaker
- Raul Rusescu (born 1988), Romanian footballer
- Raül Romeva (born 1971), Spanish economist and politician
- Raul Salvatierra (born 1991), Bolivian basketball player
- Raul Seixas (1945–1989), Brazilian singer–songwriter
- Raul Siem (born 1973), Estonian politician
- Raúl Tito (born 1997), Peruvian footballer

== See also ==
- Rahul
- Ralph (disambiguation)
- Raoul (disambiguation)
