= Raoul IV =

Raoul IV or Ralph IV may refer to:

- Raoul IV de Beaumont-au-Maine (11th century), viscount of Maine
- Ralph IV of Valois (died 1074), count of Valois, Vexin and Amiens
- Raoul IV de Conches (died 1126), lord of Conches-en-Ouche of the House of Tosny
- Raoul IV de Crépy (died 1152), count of Vermandois
- Raoul IV de La Barre de Nanteuil (1743–1833), mayor of Andelys and president of the Conseil général de l'Eure

== See also ==
- Ralph I (disambiguation)
- Raoul II (disambiguation)
- Raoul III (disambiguation)
