= Abd al-Ra'uf =

ʻAbd al-Raʼūf (ALA-LC romanization of Arabic: عبد الرؤوف) is a male Muslim given name. It is built from the Arabic words ʻabd and al-Raʼūf, one of the names of God in the Qur'an, which give rise to the Muslim theophoric names. It means 'servant of the Lenient One'.

Because the letter r is a sun letter, the letter l of the al- is assimilated to it. Thus although the name is written in Arabic with letters corresponding to Abd al-Ra'uf, the usual pronunciation corresponds to Abd ar-Ra'uf. Alternative transliterations include Abdul Raouf and others, all subject to variable spacing and hyphenation.

People with the name include:

== Arts ==
- Abdurauf Fitrat (1886–1938), Uzbek, cultural modernist active in Soviet Central Asia
- Abdur Rouf Choudhury (1929–1996), Bengali writer
- Abdul-Rauf Khalid (1957–2011), Pakistani filmmaker

== Politics and religion ==
- Shah Abdur Rauf (1889–1969), Bengali politician
- Abdul Rauf Azhar (born 1974), Pakistani Islamic militant
- Mohammed Yasser Abdel Rahman Abdel Raouf Arafat al-Qudwa al-Husseini, or just Yasser Arafat (1929–2004), Palestinian leader
- Abdul Rauf al-Kasm (1932–2025), Syrian politician
- Abdool Raouf Bundhun (born 1937), Vice President of Mauritius
- Abdelraouf Rawabdeh (born 1939), Jordanian politician
- Munshi Abdur Rouf (1943–1971), soldier hero in the Bangladesh Liberation War
- Feisal Abdul Rauf (born 1948), Arab-American imam and author
- Rana Abdul Rauf (born 1953), Pakistani politician
- Mahmoud Abdel Rauf al-Mabhouh, or just Mahmoud al-Mabhouh (1960–2010), Palestinian, Hamas military commander
- Abdul Rauff Hibathul Hakeem, or just Rauff Hakeem (born 1960), Sri Lankan politician
- Abderraouf Jdey (born 1965), Tunisian-Canadian accused of terrorism
- Abdul Rauf Omar Mohammed Abu Al Qusin (born 1965), Libyan held in Guantanamo
- Abdul Rauf Khan (born 1969), Pakistani politician
- Abdul Rauf (anti-Taliban cleric), imam at the Herati Mosque in Kabul
- "Mullah" Abdul Rauf Aliza (1981–2015), also known as Abdul Rauf Khadim, a Taliban commander, allegedly tied to ISIS at time of his death
- Abdul Rauf Ibrahimi (born 1962), Uzbek legislator and politician from Afghanistan
- Abdur Rauf Danapuri (1874–1948), Indian Islamic scholar and political figure

== Sports ==
- Mahmoud Abdul-Rauf (formerly Chris Wayne Jackson) (born 1969), American basketball player
- Md Abdur Rouf (born 1974), Bangladeshi kabaddi player
- Abdur Rauf (cricketer) (born 1978), Pakistani cricketer
- Abderraouf Zarabi (born 1979), Algerian footballer
- Ahmed Abdel Raouf (born 1986), Egyptian footballer
- Abdul Rauf (cricketer) (born 1998), Pakistani cricketer

== Other people ==
- Mohammad Abdur Rouf, Bangladeshi judge

== See also ==
- Birshreshtha Munshi Abdur Rouf Library and Museum, Bangladesh
