= Ralph I =

Ralph I may refer to:

- Rudolph of France (c. 890 – 936)
- Ralph I of Périgord (d. 975)
- Ralph I, Count of Vermandois (1085–1152)
- Ralph I, Lord of Coucy (c. 1134 – 1191)
- Ralph I, Count of Eu (b. 1160/1165 – d. 1219)
- Raoul I of Brienne, Count of Eu (d. 1344)
- The fictional King Ralph

== See also ==
- Ralph (disambiguation)
- Raoul (disambiguation)
- Raul (disambiguation)
