= 8XK =

8XK may refer to:

- Former experimental radio station established in Wilkinsburg, Pennsylvania in 1916 by Frank Conrad and deleted in 1924.
- Former Westinghouse shortwave radio station in East Pittsburgh, Pennsylvania, which changed its call sign from 8XAU in 1924.
