= Raife =

Given name

Raife is a masculine given name (pronounced rayf). It is an English, Scandinavian and German given name for a male, used in many countries across the world but most popular in English-speaking countries. It is of Old Norse origin (meaning "counsel of the wolf" or "wise wolf"), derived from the Old Norse Raðulfr (rað "counsel" + ulfr "wolf") through Old English Rædwulf.

It is a spelling representation of the traditional pronunciation of the name Ralph, a pronunciation now largely restricted to the upper classes. It is recognised with Rafe in the Oxford English Dictionary of Names. In 2016, Raife was listed at 790th most popular boys name in the U.K. In 2017, Raife rose to 606th in the U.K. rankings. In 2018, the name increased in popularity and rose in the ranks again to position 557th.

Notable people with the name include:

- Raife Wellsted (1929–2012), British philatelist

== See also ==
- Ralph
