= Biltgen =

Biltgen is a surname. Notable people with the surname include:

- François Biltgen (born 1958), Luxembourgish politician
- Raoul Biltgen (born 1974), Luxembourgish actor and writer
