= Rafe (name) =

Rafe is a given name for a male used in many countries across the world. If the name is English, Scandinavian or German it is of Old Norse origin (meaning "counsel of the wolf" or "wise wolf"), derived from the Old Norse Raðulfr (rað "counsel" + ulfr "wolf") through Old English Rædwulf. When the name is Spanish, Portuguese or Hebrew it is often a short form of Rafael.

== Notable people ==
- Rafe de Crespigny (born 1936), Australian sinologist, professor and writer
- Rafe Esquith, American award-winning elementary school teacher
- Rafe Furst, American entrepreneur and poker player, founder of Full Tilt Poker
- Rafe Gomez (born 1961/1962), American music producer
- Rafe Judkins (born 1983), American contestant on Survivor and television writer
- Rafe Mair (1931–2017), Canadian lawyer, political commentator and former radio personality and politician
- Rafe Needleman, American editor and author
- Rafe Pomerance (1946–2026), American environmentalist
- Rafe Spall (born 1983), English actor
- Rafe Stefanini, Italian musician, singer, teacher and violin maker
- Rafe Wolfe (born 1985), Jamaican footballer

== Fictional characters ==
- Rafe, in Christopher Marlowe's play Doctor Faustus
- Rafe, in Francis Beaumont's 1607 play The Knight of the Burning Pestle
- Rafe Adler, the main antagonist of the 2016 video game Uncharted 4: A Thief's End
- Rafe Cameron, a character in the series Outer Banks
- Rafe Durville, on New Zealand daytime drama Shortland Street
- Rafe Garretson, on the soap opera One Life to Live
- Rafe Gruber, on NBC primetime series Chuck
- Rafe Guttman, the lead in the film Bordello of Blood
- Rafe Hernandez, on the soap opera Days of Our Lives
- Rafe Hollister, moonshiner and singer on The Andy Griffith Show
- Rafe Kovich, on the soap opera Port Charles
- Rafe McCawley, the lead in the film Pearl Harbor, played by Ben Affleck
- Rafe McCawley, a lead in the SyFy series Defiance, played by Graham Greene
- Rafael "Rafe" Khatchadorian, protagonist of James Patterson's book Middle School: The Worst Years of My Life

== See also ==
- Raja Rafe (born 1983), Syrian footballer
- Ralph, another form of this name
- Raef, a variant spelling
- Rafer, a similar name
- Raife, a variant spelling
