= Wellsted =

Wellsted is a surname. Notable people with the surname include:

- James Raymond Wellsted (1805–1842), lieutenant in the Indian navy
- Raife Wellsted (1929–2012), British philatelist
- Sophie Matilda Wellsted, mother of Kate Marsden (1859-1931), British missionary, explorer, writer and nursing heroine
- James Wellsted, the executive vice president of Sibanye-Stillwater

== See also ==
- Wellstead, a town and locality of the City of Albany, Western Australia
