= Ralfs (given name) =

Male given name

- Gender: Male
- Language: Latvian
- Name day: 22 March

Origin
- Region of origin: Latvia

Other names
- Related names: Ralph, Ralf

Ralfs is a Latvian masculine given name. Individuals bearing the name Ralfs include:

- Ralfs Eilands (born 1993), Latvian pop musician (PeR)
- Ralfs Freibergs (born 1991), Latvian ice hockey player
- Ralfs Grīnbergs (born 1995), Latvian ice hockey player
- Ralfs Nemiro (born 1981), Latvian politician
- Ralfs Sirmacis (born 1994), Latvian rally driver
