= Rafer =

Rafer is a given name which may refer to:

- Rafer Alston (born 1976), basketball player
- Rafer Johnson (1935–2020), American actor and former decathlete
- Rafer Joseph (born 1968), athlete
- Rafer Mohammed (born 1955), athlete
- Rafer Weigel (born 1969), news anchor

== See also ==
- Rafe (name)
