= Dunning R. McNair =

Sergeant at Arms of the US Senate (1797–1875)

Dunning Robert McNair

Sergeant at Arms of the United States Senate
- In office March 17, 1853 – July 6, 1861
- Preceded by: Robert Beale
- Succeeded by: George T. Brown

Personal details
- Born: April 2, 1797 Wilkinsburg, Pennsylvania
- Died: March 16, 1875 (aged 77) Washington, D.C.
- Resting place: Congressional Cemetery, Washington, D.C.

Dunning Robert McNair (April 2, 1797 – March 16, 1875) was the Sergeant at Arms of the United States Senate from March 17, 1853, to July 6, 1861.

== Biography ==
Dunning R. McNair was born in what would become Wilkinsburg, Pennsylvania, on April 2, 1797, the son of Dunning Mcnair, a prominent Pittsburgh area legislator, militia colonel, businessman, and land speculator. Dunning R. McNair was involved in several business ventures, including operation of a stage line that carried mail between Pittsburgh and Philadelphia, and along the National Road between Cumberland, Maryland and Wheeling, West Virginia. He also became active in the militia and attained the rank of colonel.

McNair later relocated to Lexington, Kentucky, where he speculated in land and continued to operate stagecoach lines and carry mail. In the 1840s he was appointed War Department Mineral Agent with the rank of Major at Fort Wilkins, Michigan, where he supervised the mining of copper ore for military use.

From 1853 to 1861 McNair was Sergeant at Arms of the United States Senate. He is most notable because while serving as Sergeant at Arms in 1856 he helped restrain Representative Preston Brooks after Brooks used his cane to beat Senator Charles Sumner on the Senate floor.

McNair died in Washington, D.C., on March 16, 1875, and was buried at the Congressional Cemetery.
