= The Hobart Shakespeareans =

2005 television film

- DVD cover
- Directed by: Mel Stuart
- Starring: Ian McKellen, Michael York
- Original language: English

Production
- Producer: Mel Stuart
- Cinematography: Alex Rotaru
- Editor: Alex Rotaru

Original release
- Network: PBS
- Release: 2005

The Hobart Shakespeareans of Hobart Boulevard Elementary School is a 2005 documentary film that tells the story of the inspirational inner-city Los Angeles school teacher Rafe Esquith whose rigorous fifth-grade curriculum includes English, mathematics, geography, and literature. The pinnacle of student achievement each year is the performance of a play by William Shakespeare; in the year of filming, that play was Hamlet.

The Hobart Shakespeareans drew the attention of renowned Shakespearean actors Ian McKellen and Michael York, who pay a visit to the class to watch their performance of Hamlet. Delighted with the students, York calls the Hobart Shakespeareans "one of the great Shakespeare troupes" in Los Angeles.

Rafe and the Hobart Shakespeareans work every year to perform a Shakespeare play. The recent plays they have performed were As You Like It and The Merchant of Venice.

The Hobart Shakespeareans aired on PBS' P.O.V. series in 2005. It was produced and directed by Mel Stuart.
