= Wilkinsburg, Pennsylvania =

Borough in Pennsylvania, US

- Borough
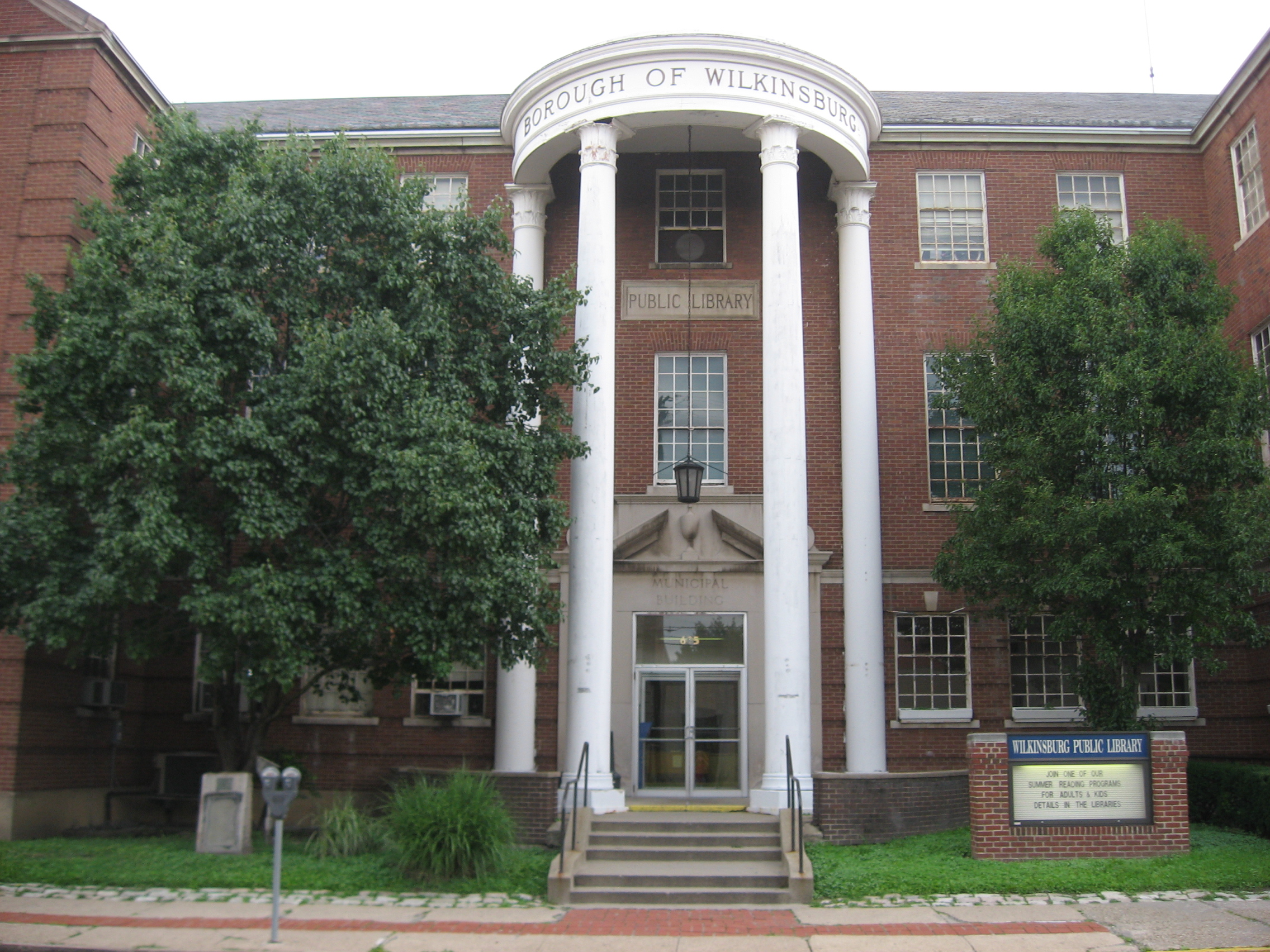
- Entrance to Wilkinsburg's municipal building and library, 605 Ross Avenue

- Logo

- Location in Allegheny County and the U.S. state of Pennsylvania.
- Coordinates: 40°26′38″N 79°52′39″W
- Country: United States
- State: Pennsylvania
- County: Allegheny
- Named for: John Wilkins Jr.

Area
  - Total: 2.25 sq mi (5.83 km^{2})
  - Land: 2.25 sq mi (5.83 km^{2})
  - Water: 0 sq mi (0.00 km^{2})

Population (2020)
  - Total: 14,349
  - Density: 6,369.2/sq mi (2,459.15/km^{2})
- Time zone: UTC-5 (Eastern (EST))
  - Summer (DST): UTC-4 (EDT)
- FIPS code: 42-85188
- Website: www.wilkinsburgpa.gov

Wilkinsburg is a borough in Allegheny County, Pennsylvania, United States. The borough has a population of 14,349 as of the 2020 census. Wilkinsburg is part of the Pittsburgh metropolitan area. The borough was named for John Wilkins Jr., a United States Army officer who served as Quartermaster General of the United States Army from 1796 to 1802.

== History ==
Wilkinsburg is located in an area of the Appalachian Plateau where various land and water transportation routes join, an area which Native Americans have inhabited for thousands of years. Geologically, Wilkinsburg centers on a valley going through the hills located east of the three rivers confluence: namely, the Allegheny River, the Monongahela River, and the Ohio River. The Wilkinsburg valley eased passage by land through the barrier of the Appalachian Mountains, for example travel to and from Philadelphia and other Atlantic coast areas, including travel through the Cumberland Gap. The nearby meeting of the three rivers facilitated passage by water and by land alongside the rivers, which eventually joining the south-flowing Mississippi River, meeting the Gulf of Mexico, and so linking with oceanic trade. This made Wilkinsburg a nexus for divergent routes, where travel from the east and from travel from the south intersected, together with other transportation routes to the north and west. A vital section of the major land road or pathway passage to the east is now Penn Avenue, still a main street of Wilkinsburg.

In the early 1700s, European traders arrived, and by mid-century had some established colonial sites, including Fort Duquesne, established by France. Subsequently, the general area became a major battleground during the French and Indian Wars, during which George Washington (who passed through what is now Wilkinsburg in 1753, on a diplomatic mission to French territory), Edward Braddock, and John Forbes gained a place in history, each built roads and otherwise enhanced the land transportation routes. The French and Indian War (1754–1763) was fought between France, England, and various Native groups for territorial control. France lost control of the area in 1758. British forces built Fort Pitt between 1759 and 1761, near the three river junction. France subsequently relinquished claims on the area. In 1776, the British colonies declared independence, and the Treaty of Paris (1783) confirmed the area west of the Appalachians as part of the newly formed United States. In 1780, Pennsylvania and Virginia agreed to extend the Mason–Dixon line westward, and the region became part of Pennsylvania, settling a dispute of which state Wilkinsburg would end up being a part of. The Treaty of Fort Stanwix (1784) resulted in the Iroquois Nations also relinquishing their claims to the area, but this was not necessarily the case for other Native American polities.

In the 1800s, trade was increasingly augmented by major mining and manufacturing operations. The general area's population continued to proliferate from the late 1800s and the early 1900s, with numerous immigrants from various parts of Europe and African Americans of the Great Migration migrating from the Southern United States. For Wilkinsburg, this process sometimes proceeded slowly and sometimes more rapidly.

The Land Company of the Colony of Pennsylvania began to offer deeds in the general area to become Wilkinsburg in 1769. Andrew Levi Levy Sr., purchased 266 acres of woodland, to which he officially gave the name of Africa (for reasons which remain obscure). In 1788, Levy sold his deed to William Thompson (a retired brigadier general who had served in the Continental Army during the American Revolutionary War). Thompson died shortly after, and the land was sold to Col. Dunning McNair (the father of Dunning R. McNair, who would become the sergeant at arms of the United States Senate, 1853–1861).

Dunning McNair was a significant landholder. In 1790, Dunning McNair laid out a village called McNairstown on the "Great Road" later known as Penn Avenue. In a deed dated September 1812, McNair deeded land to a certain Patrick Green, by which Wilkinsburgh was officially registered. In 1825, Dunning McNair died. By 1812, the village was referred to as "Wilkinsburgh" in honor of John Wilkins Jr., a wartime friend of McNair.

James Kelly began a half-century or so of heavy involvement with the area when he paid $12,000 for McNair's former land, which Kelly subsequently added to. James Kelly was involved in much of the civic, religious, educational and other activities during this period. In 1873 the City of Pittsburgh annexed a portion of Wilkins Township containing Wilkinsburg, but less than three years later, a legal action reversed the annexation.

On October 5, 1887, Wilkinsburg separated from the recently created Sterrett Township to become an independent borough.

Although the borough has been economically depressed in recent years, many efforts are being made to change this. In 2004, the Pittsburgh History and Landmarks Foundation launched initiatives in partnership with its for-profit development affiliate, Landmark Development Corporation, to begin restoration work on historic structures in Wilkinsburg's Hamnett Place neighborhood. Within a decade, more than 70 structures were improved, a new neighborhood center was opened, and the community's supply of affordable housing was increased. The collaborators were subsequently honored with the Richard H. Driehaus Foundation National Preservation Award to recognize their accomplishments. During this time, the Hamnett Historic District was also established; that historic district was then approved on June 28, 2010, for listing on the National Register of Historic Places.

In 2015, the Pittsburgh History and Landmarks Foundation and its for-profit affiliate, Landmark Development Corporation, entered into a collaboration with Falconhurst Development to begin an $11.5 million multi-site restoration within and near the Hamnett Historic District. In addition to restoring four vacant buildings which had been built sometime around the beginning of the 20th century, the developer had plans to open a series of new townhouses in the same area by 2016, with the collaborators again indicating that the housing would be affordable, based on United States Housing and Urban Development Department (HUD) guidelines. The ground was broken on the project in late September 2015.

=== Municipal reorganization attempts ===
In 2020 a local movement gained traction to consider merging the Borough of Wilkinsburg with the City of Pittsburgh. Proponents of the merger argued a declining population and tax base created mounting financial problems that could be preempted by the consolidation. The Wilkinsburg Community Development Corporation organized a subgroup, Wilkinsburg Pittsburgh Merger, to study the feasibility and impact of such a merger. The organization and its subgroup became the main organizing faction in support of the proposed merger. The local governing council declined to adopt the merger as a legislative project, leaving the issue to constituent action. It was initially believed the merger could be settled under a 1903 Annexation law regarding municipal consolidation. Under this law, a municipal merger could be approved following a successful referendum vote of Wilkinsburg residents and approval from the Pittsburgh City Council. Proponents of the merger began organizing a petition to launch such a referendum vote for the 2021 Election. However, after several court hearings, including an appeal to the Supreme Court of Pennsylvania, the 1903 law was ruled defunct. The Supreme Court communicated that residents of both Wilkinsburg and Pittsburgh would need to vote to approve a merger. Following this ruling, the merger effort has stalled, and community members have turned to a petition for Home Rule status instead.

=== Home of modern broadcasting ===
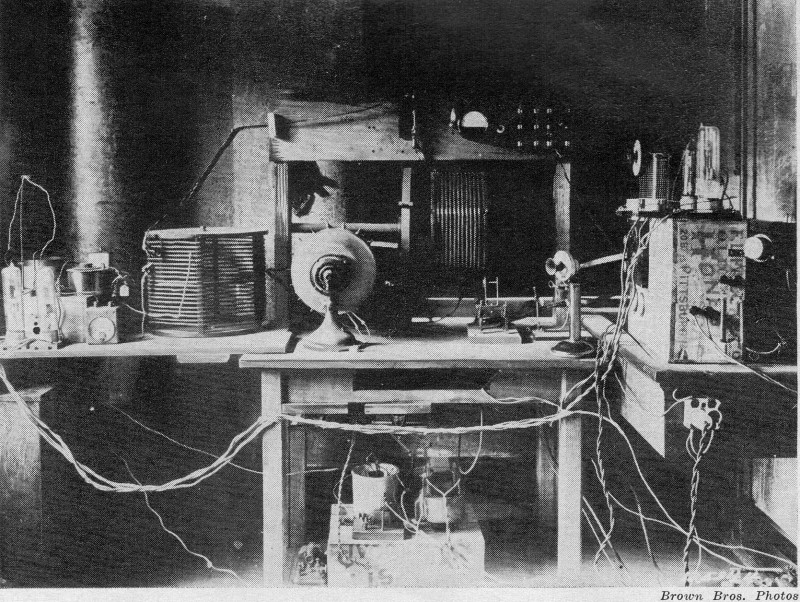
Frank Conrad radio station 8XK 1920

Modern broadcasting as known in its current form began when Wilkinsburg resident Frank Conrad spearheaded a radio laboratory at his home, coordinated with Westinghouse Electric Corporation and the United States Signal Corps, under a special war time permit (using call signs 2-WM and 2-WE). After moving from Swissvale to Wilkinsburg, Conrad installed a radio station on the top floor of his backyard two-story garage, with a microphone, where he worked into the wee hours of the morning, eventually resulting in the development of modern broadcasting, as do it yourself listeners who had made their own crystal radio sets began to respond, some quite enthused by the music broadcast when Frank Conrad coupled a phonograph to radio. Wilkinsburg thus became the original location for modern broadcasting, combining the concepts of "the station, the audience, the programs, and a means to pay for the programs" after Conrad accepted a donation from a Wilkinsburg music store to promote its musical offerings. This was all before and leading up to KDKA and the development of commercial radio. In 1916, KDKA began broadcasting, as experimental station 8XK, from the Westinghouse plant in East Pittsburgh and in a small garage owned by Frank Conrad, before it was launched with its current call letters on November 2, 1920. In 1923, Wilkinsburg-based Russian immigrant Vladimir Zworykin designed and patented the iconoscope, the photocell "eye" of early television cameras. Today, ABC affiliate WTAE-TV is located in the borough on Ardmore Boulevard.

== Geography ==
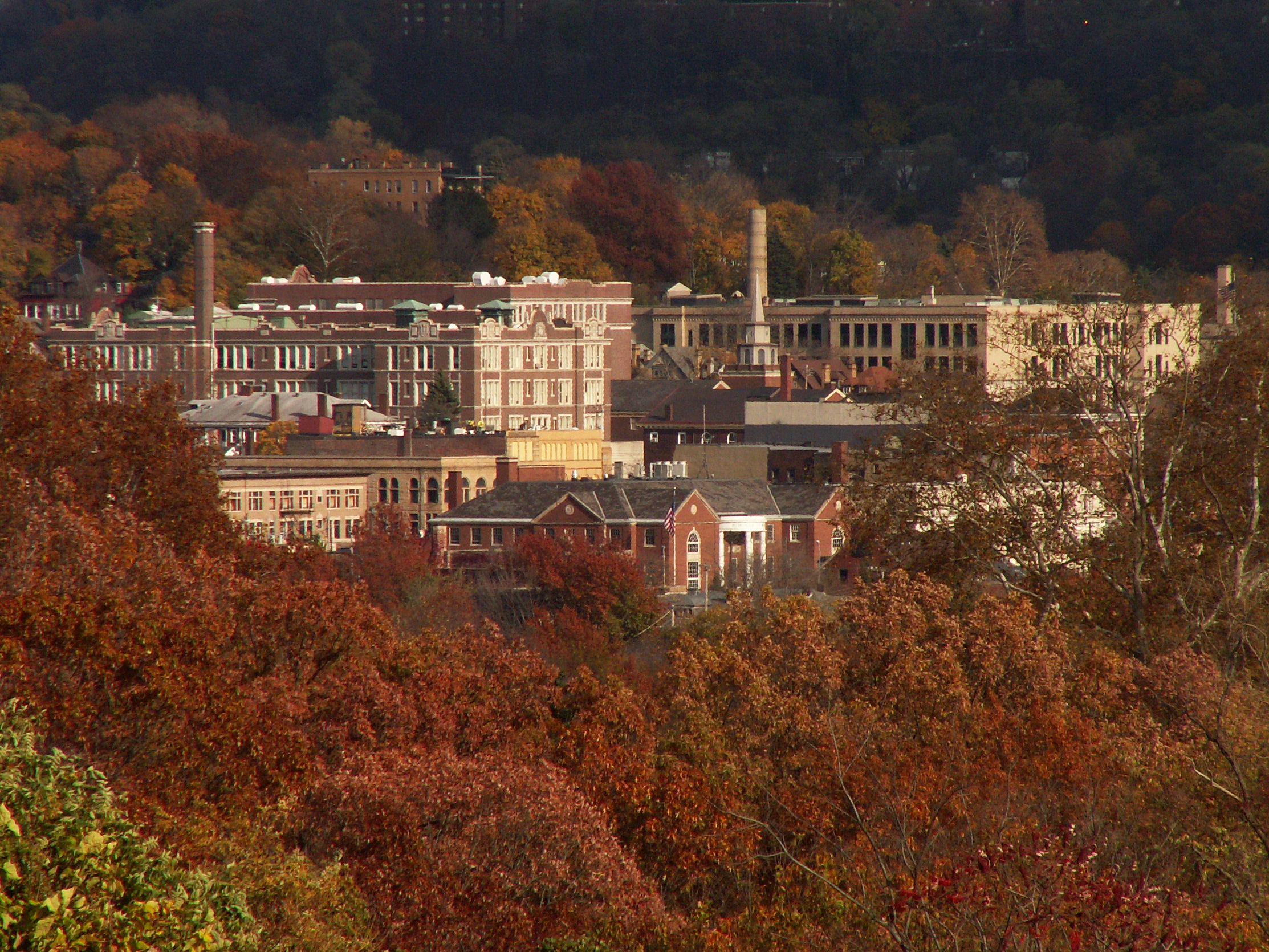
The central business district of Wilkinsburg

According to the U.S. Census Bureau, the borough has a total area of 2.3 square miles (6.0 km^{2}), all land.

=== Surrounding neighborhoods ===
Wilkinsburg has ten borders, including Penn Hills Township to the northeast, Churchill to the east, Forest Hills to the southeast, Edgewood to the south, Swissvale to the southwest, and the Pittsburgh neighborhoods of Regent Square, Point Breeze, and North Point Breeze to the west, Homewood South to the northwest, and East Hills to the north.

== Demographics ==
Historical population
Census	Pop.	Note	%±
1880	1,529		—
1890	4,662		204.9%
1900	11,886		155.0%
1910	18,924		59.2%
1920	24,403		29.0%
1930	29,639		21.5%
1940	29,853		0.7%
1950	31,418		5.2%
1960	30,066		−4.3%
1970	26,780		−10.9%
1980	23,669		−11.6%
1990	21,080		−10.9%
2000	19,196		−8.9%
2010	15,930		−17.0%
2020	14,349		−9.9%
U.S. Decennial Census

=== Racial and ethnic composition ===
Wilkinsburg borough, Pennsylvania – Racial and ethnic composition Note: the US Census treats Hispanic/Latino as an ethnic category. This table excludes Latinos from the racial categories and assigns them to a separate category. Hispanics/Latinos may be of any race.
Race / Ethnicity (NH = Non-Hispanic)	Pop 2000	Pop 2010	Pop 2020	% 2000	% 2010	% 2020
White alone (NH)	5,558	4,427	4,517	28.95%	27.79%	31.48%
Black or African American alone (NH)	12,684	10,514	8,357	66.08%	66.00%	58.24%
Native American or Alaska Native alone (NH)	67	59	23	0.35%	0.37%	0.16%
Asian alone (NH)	155	161	243	0.81%	1.01%	1.69%
Pacific Islander alone (NH)	12	3	2	0.06%	0.02%	0.01%
Other Race alone (NH)	67	30	105	0.35%	0.19%	0.73%
Mixed race or Multiracial (NH)	437	447	686	2.28%	2.81%	4.78%
Hispanic or Latino (any race)	216	289	416	1.13%	1.81%	2.90%
Total	19,196	15,930	14,349	100.00%	100.00%	100.00%

=== 2020 census ===
As of the 2020 census, Wilkinsburg had a population of 14,349. The median age was 40.9 years. 15.9% of residents were under the age of 18 and 20.3% of residents were 65 years of age or older. For every 100 females there were 81.3 males, and for every 100 females age 18 and over there were 78.1 males age 18 and over.

100.0% of residents lived in urban areas, while 0.0% lived in rural areas.

There were 7,802 households in Wilkinsburg, of which 16.4% had children under the age of 18 living in them. Of all households, 17.9% were married-couple households, 26.9% were households with a male householder and no spouse or partner present, and 47.2% were households with a female householder and no spouse or partner present. About 51.7% of all households were made up of individuals and 18.2% had someone living alone who was 65 years of age or older.

There were 9,197 housing units, of which 15.2% were vacant. The homeowner vacancy rate was 2.7% and the rental vacancy rate was 8.9%.

=== 2000 census ===
As of the census of 2000, there were 19,196 people, 9,138 households, and 4,477 families residing in the borough. The population density was 8,335.1 inhabitants per square mile (3,218.2/km^{2}). There were 10,696 housing units at an average density of 4,644.3 per square mile (1,793.2/km^{2}). The racial makeup of the borough was 29.25% White, 66.51% African American, 0.38% Native American, 0.81% Asian, 0.06% Pacific Islander, 0.55% from other races, and 2.44% from two or more races. Hispanic or Latino of any race were 1.13% of the population.

There were 9,138 households, out of which 22.6% had children under the age of 18 living with them, 24.3% were married couples living together, 20.7% had a female householder with no husband present, and 51.0% were non-families. 44.5% of all households were made up of individuals, and 12.5% had someone living alone who was 65 years of age or older. The average household size was 2.06, and the average family size was 2.91.

In the borough, the population was spread out, with 23.4% under 18, 7.7% from 18 to 24, 30.0% from 25 to 44, 23.1% from 45 to 64, and 15.8% who were 65 years of age or older. The median age was 38 years. For every 100 females, there were 78.5 males. For every 100 females age 18 and over, there were 72.0 males.

The median income for a household in the borough was $26,621, and the median income for a family was $33,412. Males had a median income of $26,813 versus $26,196 for females. The per capita income was $16,890. About 15.9% of families and 18.7% of the population were below the poverty line, including 30.8% of those under age 18 and 14.2% of those age 65 or over.

=== Religion ===
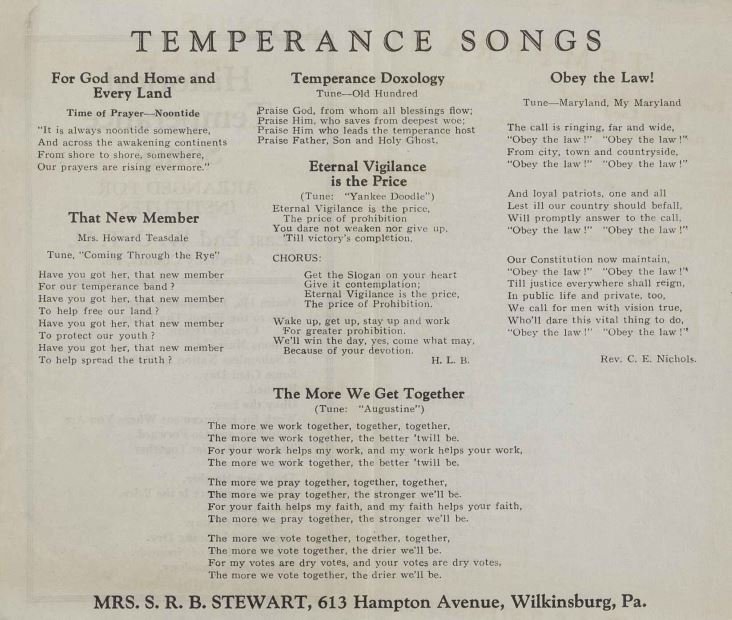
Temperance movement song handbook, from the East End Woman's Christian Temperance Union, Wilkinsburg, 1920

Wilkinsburg was founded and developed by highly religious European immigrants. The borough has a remarkably high concentration of churches, mostly Protestant. According to borough leader James Kelly, the reversal of Wilkinsburg's annexation to Pittsburgh in the 1870s was to maintain the community's religious integrity.

== Arts and culture ==
Wilkinsburg Borough has a Community Art and Civic Design Commission charged with review and legislation for "new and renovated structures, infrastructure, landscapes, works of art, memorials, and monuments on all public property and on all private property designated for commercial use." Due to its location in Allegheny County, and especially its proximity to Pittsburgh, Wilkinsburg is in the neighborhood for numerous opportunities for experiences in art and culture.

The most notable agent of revitalization and development in Wilkinsburg is the Wilkinsburg Community Development Corporation (WCDC), a non-profit incorporated in 2007 with a mission "to promote the revitalization of Wilkinsburg through business & residential development; organizational & individual civic leadership; and ethnic & cultural diversity". Their notable community programs include classes for local entrepreneurs, classes on home buying, community events, and the Vacant Home Tour. The WCDC focuses primarily on the Wilkinsburg Business District, the area around the intersection of Penn Avenue and Wood Street. The WCDC's Business District Revitalization Plan promotes a "flourishing commercial and retail environment in Wilkinsburg" and consists of planning and policy recommendations. In May 2015, the WCDC's advocacy resulted in an approved liquor license referendum, legalizing the sale of up to five restaurant liquor licenses in the borough, which had been a dry community since 1935.

=== Library ===
In 1899 the Wilkinsburg library was founded as a branch of the Braddock library (which was the first of the Carnegie libraries in the nation).

== Parks and recreation ==
Wilkinsburg has several parks of various sizes. The largest is Hunter Park, which at almost nine acres includes sports courts, fields, playground equipment, and woodland. There are also six smaller parks.

== Government and politics ==
Presidential Elections Results
Year	Republican	Democratic	Third Parties
2020	12% 1,102	86% 7,392	0.6% 55
2016	8% 628	91% 7,341	1% 121
2012	9% 747	90% 7,876	1% 86

Wilkinsburg is a borough, located in the U.S. Commonwealth of Pennsylvania; which means that Wilkinsburg is a self-governing municipal entity, of the sort often thought of as a town. Wilkinsburg Borough is organized into three wards: First, Second, and Third.

Overall oversight of Wilkinsburg Borough is by the borough council. The borough council generally consists of nine elected representatives, three from each ward. Wilkinsburg has or has associated various boards, committees, and authorities. Wilkinsburg also has a mayor and a borough manager. Wilkinsburg Borough authorities, boards, and commissions include the Civil Service Commission, the Community Art and Civic Design Commission, the Citizens Advisory Commission on Shade Trees, the Parks and Recreation Advisory Board, the Planning Commission, the Zoning Hearing Board, the Board of Library Directors, the Industrial and Commercial Development Authority, and the Municipal Authority.

Public education is handled by the Wilkinsburg School District's board of directors, in combination with the Pennsylvania State Board of Education, the Pennsylvania Department of Education, and the Pennsylvania General Assembly. The domain of public education is separate from that of the borough.

Wilkinsburg water and sewage services are provided through a municipal authority, the Wilkinsburg-Penn Joint Water Authority, a coalition serving several communities. The Wilkinsburg Borough Council appoints three members to the board.

Wilkinsburg voters voted predominantly for the Democratic Party in the 2012 and 2016 presidential elections.

== Crime ==
Wilkinsburg was home to the infamous Larimer Avenue-Wilkinsburg (LAW) Gang, which the federal government indicted under the Racketeer Influenced and Corrupt Organizations Act (RICO). The indictment started in 1995 when the federal government investigated and arrested many people with criminal ties or activities. Overall, crime in Wilkinsburg is higher than in outlying neighborhoods on average. However, crime has slightly declined in recent years.

=== 2000 shooting spree ===
On March 1, 2000, Wilkinsburg received national attention when Ronald Taylor killed three people and wounded two others in a racially motivated shooting spree that occurred in part at the local Burger King and McDonald's restaurants.

=== 2016 mass shooting ===
On March 9, 2016, five people, including a pregnant woman, were killed in a shooting at a cook-out in Wilkinsburg. The city council has many plans to beautify the neighborhood and repair many of the vacant homes such as the apartment building on 855 Rebecca Avenue. Furthermore, Vice President of the City Council recently started Wilkinsburg Community Conversations, whereby community members have the opportunity to discuss current issues the borough is facing.

== Education ==
In its early history, education in Wilkinsburg was completely private. Many schools were started by different teachers and held in their homes. The Wilkinsburg Academy, founded in 1852, was the beginning of large-scale schooling. The borough adopted the Free Common School Act of 1834 in 1840; James Kelly loaned money for the first common school, which served until 1850. From this time, the number of students rose exponentially. By 1910, there were 4,253 students in six public schools. Today, Wilkinsburg School District consists of two elementary schools, Kelly Primary and Turner Intermediate schools. Due to lack of funding, Wilkinsburg's Junior and Senior High schools closed in 2016. The district now outsources Junior and Senior High School education to Westinghouse High School in the Pittsburgh Public School district.

Wilkinsburg is also home to the Sister Thea Bowman Catholic Academy. This is a Catholic elementary school which was formed as a merger of St. James School in Wilkinsburg and Holy Rosary in Homewood (Pittsburgh). The new school is housed in the former St. James School building and educates children from pre-kindergarten through eighth grade.

== Transportation ==
Wilkinsburg is located at the nexus of various transportation systems, including road, rail, and river.

=== Road ===
Wilkinsburg is located along historic roadways. For example, since 1913 Wilkinsburg is one of the locations transversed by the Lincoln Highway. The historic Lincoln Highway runs from Times Square in New York City to Lincoln Park in San Francisco. The Lincoln Highway legacy includes Penn Avenue and Ardmore Boulevard in Wilkinsburg: these are State Route 8 and Federal Route 30. Penn Avenue was even earlier along the main trajectory of the Forbes Road, which was used by British officer John Forbes to lead a military expedition to attack the French position at Fort Duquesne (later Fort Pitt), in 1758, as part of the Seven Years' War (1756–1763). Previously British officer Edward Braddock had built a road with the same general trajectory, known as Braddock's Road (beneath which he was later buried), which lead to the French fortifications at the confluence of the Allegheny and Monongahela rivers.

=== Rail ===
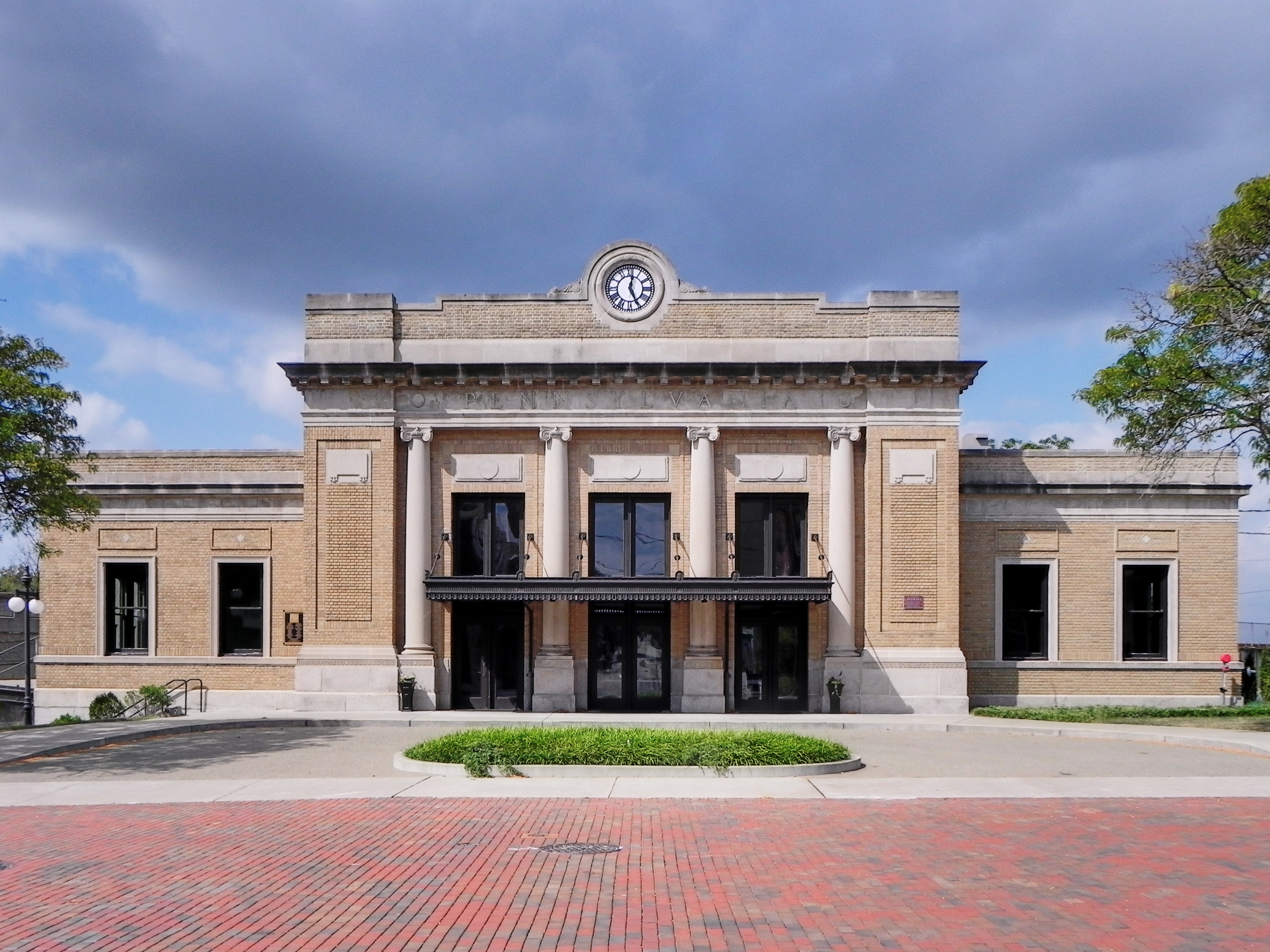
Wilkinsburg station

Until September 14, 1975, Wilkinsburg had inter-city passenger rail service. On that day Amtrak discontinued service, citing a total of 128 passengers boarding or alighting in the first six months of 1975, the lowest system-wide. The last train serving Wilkinsburg was the National Limited, which operated daily between New York City and Kansas City, Missouri. The PennDOT-operated Parkway Limited provided commuter service to Pittsburgh for nine months in 1981 but was also canceled because of low ridership.

Wilkinsburg has multiple stations operated by the Port Authority of Allegheny County, on the Martin Luther King Jr. East Busway:

- Wilkinsburg bus station
- Hamnett bus station

=== Rivers ===
Historically the confluence of the Allegheny River and the Monongahela River created an important transportation nexus. Before the modern road and rail systems transportation along waterways was even more significant than it is today. Wilkinsburg is located between the Allegheny and the Monongahela rivers, near to where they meet to form the Ohio River, although Wilkinsburg does not actually border either river.

== Notable people ==
- Jonathan Adams, actor, Chuck Larabee on the sitcom Last Man Standing.
- Paul V. Applegarth, former chief executive officer, Millennium Challenge Corporation
- Les Biederman (1907–1981), former sports writer, columnist, and editor, The Pittsburgh Press
- Daniel Carter, jazz musician
- Frank Conrad, radio broadcast pioneer
- Charlie Deal, former professional baseball player, Chicago Cubs and Detroit Tigers
- Richard Frankenburg, former member of Pennsylvania House of Representatives
- Vic Fusia, former football player and coach
- Dick Groat, former professional baseball player, Philadelphia Phillies, Pittsburgh Pirates, San Francisco Giants, and St. Louis Cardinals and pro basketball player for Fort Wayne Pistons
- Hardo, rapper
- Amzi D. Harmon, Medal of Honor recipient in the American Civil War
- Treyvon Hester, former professional football player, Oakland Raiders, Philadelphia Eagles, and Washington Redskins
- Bob Hoffman, former weightlifter and bodybuilder
- Jon Robert Holden, professional and Olympic basketball player
- Kimmarie Johnson, actress, model, businesswoman, and beauty pageant titleholder
- Mike Jones, wrestler, best known by his ring name "Virgil"
- Bill McKechnie, baseball player and manager
- M. Graham Netting, herpetologist and conservationist
- Dunning R. McNair, Sergeant at Arms of the United States Senate from March 17, 1853, to July 6, 1861
- Edward Ormondroyd, author
- Bunny Yeager, photographer and model
- Ralph "Brigham" Young, former politician

== See also ==
- AM broadcasting, much of which first developed in Wilkinsburg
- Blackridge, Pennsylvania, a community located in the municipalities of Wilkinsburg, Penn Hills and Churchill
- Hamnett Historic District, Wilkinsburg, Pennsylvania
- John F. Singer House, a historical building
- List of Pittsburgh History and Landmarks Foundation Historic Landmarks, which includes the Wilkinsburg "1939 House" designed by Dwight James Baum
- Radio broadcasting
- Scholastic Corporation, now headquartered in New York City, but started up in Wilkinsburg
- Wilkinsburg School District
- Wilkinsburg station
- Wilkinsburg station (PAAC)
