= Ralph Young =

Ralph Young may refer to:

- Ralph Young (American football, born 1946), American football coach
- Ralph Young (baseball) (1888–1965), American baseball player
- Ralph Young (singer) (1918–2008), American singer and actor
- Ralph "Brigham" Young (1898–1967), American politician in the state of Washington
- Ralph F. Young, American historian
- Ralph H. Young (1889–1962), American college sports coach, athletics administrator, state legislator
- Ralph B. Young (born 1945), Canadian real estate developer
