= Raoul Combes =

Raoul Combes (15 January 1883 – 27 February 1964) was a French botanist, plant physiologist, and science historian. His research was on optimal lighting, quinones, anthocyanins, senescence, the physiology of flowering, and nutrient transport. He also contributed to applied research, such as on enhancing the storage of fruits.

Combes was born in Castelfranc in a family of winegrowers. His father was a businessman and later worked in the administration of the Clermont psychiatric hospital. Combes was educated at Clermont before joining the Paris School of Pharmacy (1900-1907) and then the Faculty of Sciences, Paris. He graduated in biology (1908) and received a doctorate in 1910 for studies on optimal lighting for plants with a dissertation titled “Détermination des intensités lumineuses optima pour les végétaux aux divers stades du développement.” His main interests continued to be in the biochemistry of plants. He joined the Faculty of Sciences in Paris and became a professor of applied botany in the École nationale d’Horticulture in 1912. After seven years he returned to the Faculty of Sciences becoming a professor in 1932 and finally chair of plant physiology in 1937. He was involved in the development of the Fontainebleau laboratory and founded the Station du Froid, Bellevue, and the Adiopodoumé and Bondy research institutes. In 1933 he published a history of botany in France.

He married Marguerite, daughter of the botanist Gaston Bonnier in 1910. They however separated and she died in 1946. He married Louis Elles, daughter of a brewery worker in Obserschaeffolsheim in 1962. Combes was the founding president of the French Society for plant physiology. He was made officer of the legion of honour in 1964.
