= Raul Cayres =

Brazilian politician (born 1999)

Member of the Legislative Assembly of Tocantins
- Incumbent
- Assumed office 1 February 2027

Personal details
- Born: 3 April 1999 (age 27)
- Party: Brazilian Democratic Movement
- Parent: Amélio Cayres (father)

Raul Cayres Santos de Almeida (born 3 April 1999) is a Brazilian politician who was elected member of the Legislative Assembly of Tocantins in 2026. From 2023 to 2026, he served as superintendent of sports and leisure of Tocantins. He is the son of Amélio Cayres.
