= Ralph Blegborough =

English physician

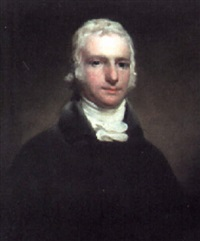
- Blegborough by John Hoppner
- Born: 8 April 1769; Richmond, Yorkshire, England
- Died: 23 January 1827 (aged 57)
- Occupation: Physician

Ralph Blegborough (8 April 1769 – 23 January 1827) was an English physician.

== Biography ==
Blegborough was the son of a surgeon at Richmond, Yorkshire, where he was born on 8 April 1769. He was educated at the grammar school of his native town, and, after acting for some time as apprentice to his father, continued his medical studies first at the university of Edinburgh, and then at Guy's and St. Thomas's Hospitals, London. Having become a member of the corporation of surgeons, London, he commenced in London as a general practitioner. He became M.D. of the university of Aberdeen on 29 December 1804, and was admitted a licentiate of the College of Physicians on 30 September 1806. About 1804 he entered into partnership with Dr. Walshman, a practitioner in midwifery, and henceforth devoted himself exclusively to this branch of his profession, in which his reputation became so high that he was selected as a medical witness before the committee of the House of Peers upon the question of the Gardner peerage. He devoted a large proportion of his time to gratuitous practice among the poor, and died, literally worn out by his benevolent exertions, on 23 January 1827. Dr. Blegborough contributed several papers to the medical journals, and also published separately 'Two Articles on the Air Pump, extracted from the "Medical and Physical Journal,"' 1802; 'Facts and Observations respecting the Efficiency of the Air Pump and Vapour Bath in Gout and other Diseases,' 1803; and 'Address to the Governors of the Surrey Dispensary,' 1810.
