= Ralph Jackson =

Ralph Jackson may refer to:

- Ralph Jackson (basketball) (born 1962), American basketball player
- Ralph Jackson (martyr) (died 1556), one of the Stratford Martyrs
- Ralph Jackson (priest) (died 1559), English priest
- Ralph Ward Jackson (1806–1880), British railway promoter and politician
- Ralph Jackson (Manitoba politician), independent candidate in the 1995 Manitoba provincial election
