= Raul Rebane =

Estonian journalist and communication consultant

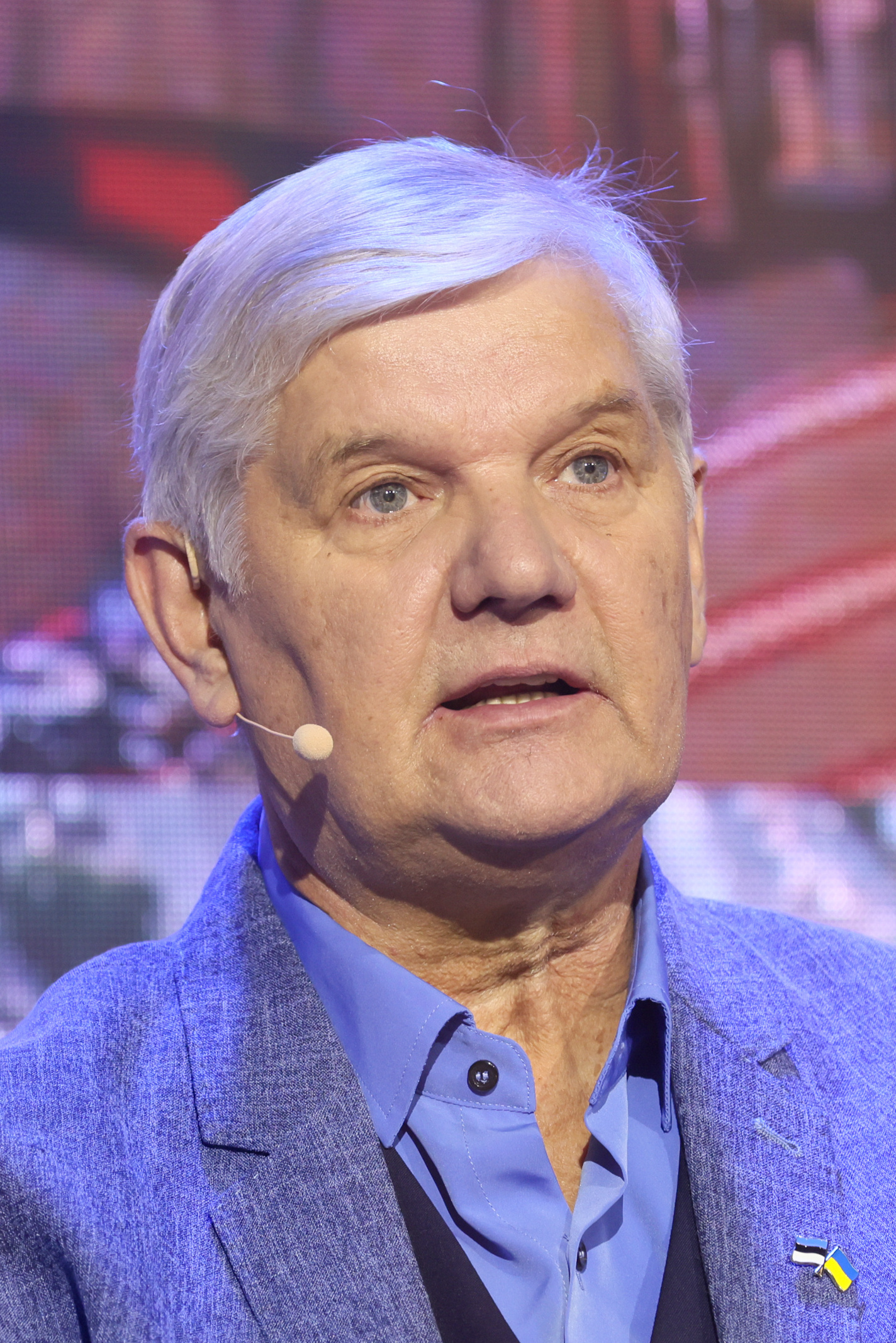
Raul Rebane in 2022

Raul Rebane (born 6 October 1953 in Pärnu) is an Estonian journalist and communication consultant.

Raul Rebane worked in the editorial office of ETV's sports programs since 1977. Has participated in the covering of 17 Olympic Games, 12 of them being present at the games. From 1998 to 2008, he was in the European Broadcasting Union's information group at various Olympic Games. After his television career, he worked mainly as a consultant. Has initiated several projects, of which helping the discus thrower Gerd Kanter to become an Olympic champion has received a lot of attention.

== Educational path ==
1960–1964 Pandivere Primary School
1964–1968 Väike-Maarja Middle School
1968–1971 Tallinn Sports Boarding School majoring in athletics
1971–1977 Tartu State University degree in journalism.

== Working life ==
Raul Rebane started working in ETV sports programs in 1975 as an intern.
1977–1994 sports reporter.
1994–1998 program manager.
1998-1999 TV-1 program director
Since 1999, worked as a consultant, trainer, strategic advisor. Conference speaker.
He has been an active publicist and columnist from 2005 to 2023. Introducer and popularizer of information warfare and psychological operations in Estonia. Member of the Council of the Institute of Estonian Memory.

== Olympic champion project ==
In the fall of 2000, Raul Rebane created a team to help discus thrower Gerd Kanter. The cooperation lasted for 12 years and was very successful. Gerd Kanter became the world champion in Osaka in 2007 and the Olympic champion in Beijing in 2008. Kanter won a bronze medal at the 2012 London Olympics. Throughout his career, Gerd Kanter won a total of 11 medals in title competitions, which makes him one of the most successful Estonian track and field athletes of all time. The team included: Vésteinn Hafsteinsson (coach), Indrek Tustit (physiotherapist, also coach since 2013), professor Mihkel Zilmer (catering consultation), Aadu Krevald (biomechanics), Hans Üürike (home page, statistics), Uno Ojand (assistant coach until 2006). The methodology and operating principles of Gerd Kanter's team have later served as an example for many athletes and coaches.

== Honours ==
- 2008 Estonian Cultural Fund's physical culture and sports annual award
- 2008 Order of the White Star, 4th class
- 2010 European Athletics Innovation Awards top prize for his project entitled "The Social Role of an Athlete".
- Opinion leader of Estonia 2016

== Personal ==
Raul Rebane has been married to Epp Rebane (born Jeret) since 1976. Epp Rebane worked as an educational researcher and as a department head in the Ministry of Education and as an advisor to the minister. Raul Rebane considers himself to be from Viru, because he grew up in the village of Pandivere in Lääne-Virumaa. Belonged to the Estonian youth team in athletics. Champion candidate in chess. His grandfather Mihkel Ausmaa and his grandfather's three brothers were police officers, so the family suffered greatly with the deportation of 14.06.1941, when most of the family was taken to Siberia. From 2007 to 2018, the "Sugulaskoor Ausmaa" consisting only of relatives operated, in which Raul Rebane sang. An important part of the choir's repertoire were songs brought from Siberia and prison camps, some of which were authored by Mihkel Ausmaa, uncle of Raul Rebas. The choir participated in several Estonian Song Festivals, also as an elite choir.

== Books ==
- "Albertville and now Barcelona" (co-author), Vikertrükk 1992
- "From Helsinki to Helsinki" (co-author), Eesti Päevalehe Kirjastus 2005, ISBN 9985-9565-8-3
- "Gerd Kanter. 15 steps to winning" (co-author with Gerd Kanter), 2009, ISBN 978-9949-18-293-0
- "From fear to success. 8 rules of media communication", author Raul Rebane, Tallinna Trükikoda ISBN 978-9949-686-07-0

== Articles ==
- Raul Rebane: Women to decide election result and Estonia's path ERR 19.01.2023
- Raul Rebane: No such thing as organic war ERR 17.12.2022
- Raul Rebane: Prepare for the worst, hope for the best, believe in a miracle ERR 28.11.2022

These are some of his latest articles. The complete list can be found on his homepage (look under external links section).
