= Raif =

Raif (Arabic: رَائِف rā’if) is a masculine given name and surname of Arabic origin meaning "kind, compassionate, affectionate, benign" or "sympathetic, merciful". The name comes from the Arabic verb ra’afa (رَأَفَ) which means "to have compassion for, have mercy upon, be merciful toward" and stems from the noun ra’ūf or rawūf. Notable people with the name include:

== Given name ==
- Raif Adam (born 2005), German footballer
- Raif Akbulut (1929–??), Turkish wrestler
- Raif Badawi (born 1984), Saudi writer, dissident, and activist
- Raif Denktaş (1951–1985), Turkish Cypriot composer, politician, academic, journalist, and writer
- Raif Dizdarević (1926–2026), Bosnian politician
- Raif Husić (born 1996), German footballer
- Raif Khoury (1913–1967), Lebanese writer
- Raif Muradov (born 1993), Bulgarian footballer
- Raif Nagm (1926–2021), Jordanian civil engineer and politician

== Surname ==
- Samira Raif (born 1974), Moroccan long-distance runner

== See also ==
- Rafe (name)
