= Ralph Johnson =

Ralph Johnson may refer to:

== Sports ==
- Ralph Johnson (basketball) (1921–2005), American professional basketball player
- Ralph Johnson (footballer) (1922–2013), English footballer
- Ralph Johnson (outfielder), American baseball player
- Ralph Johnson (fencer) (born 1948), British fencer who competed at four Olympic Games
- Ralph L. Johnson, Barbadian businessman and yachtsman

== Others ==
- Ralph Johnson (bishop) (1828–1911), Anglican bishop
- Ralph Hudson Johnson (1933–1993), British neurologist
- Ralph Johnson (philosopher) (born 1940), co-creator of the subject of Informal logic at the University of Windsor
- Ralph H. Johnson (1949–1968), United States Marine awarded the Medal of Honor during the Vietnam War
  - USS Ralph Johnson (DDG-114), United States Navy Arleigh Burke class destroyer named for PFC Johnson
- Ralph Johnson (musician) (born 1951), percussionist for R&B/soul band Earth, Wind, and Fire
- Ralph C. Johnson (1953–2016), American politician
- Ralph Johnson (computer scientist) (born 1955), computer science professor at the University of Illinois at Urbana-Champaign
- Ralph Johnson (architect), Chicago-based architect

== See also ==
- Ralph Johnstone (1880–1910), American pilot and aviation pioneer
- Ralph Johnstone (politician) (1914–2010), Canadian politician and farmer
