= Raouf =

Given name

Raouf is an Arabic name originating from the Arabic word rauf meaning compassionate. It may refer to:

- Abu Abdul Raouf Zalita v. George W. Bush, writ of habeas corpus filed on behalf of Guantanamo captive Abu Abdul Rauf Zalita
- Ahmed Abdel-Raouf (born 1986), Egyptian footballer with Zamalek
- Ahmed Raouf (born 1982), Egyptian footballer
- Raouf Abbas (1939–2008), Egyptian historian and professor of modern history at Cairo University
- Raouf Bouzaiene (born 1970), retired Tunisian football defender
- Raouf Bundhun (born 1937), Vice President of Mauritius from 2002 to 2007
- Raouf Hannachi, Canadian citizen who served as the Muezzin at Assuna Mosque in Montreal
- Raouf Mroivili (born 1999), Comorian footballer
- Raouf Salama Moussa (1929–2006), Egyptian bacteriologist and editor
- Ra'ouf Mus'ad (1937–2025), Egyptian playwright, journalist and novelist
