= Raoul-Duval =

Raoul-Duval is a French surname. Notable people with the surname include:

- Edgar Raoul-Duval (1832–1887), French politician
- Georgie Raoul-Duval (1866–1913), French/American writer, playwright, and socialite
- Maurice Raoul-Duval (1866–1916), French polo player
- Michael Raoul Duval (1936–2001), American banker and lawyer
