= Rafe Esquith =

American teacher

Rafe Esquith is an American teacher who taught at Hobart Boulevard Elementary School, in Los Angeles, California, from 1984 until his resignation in 2015 as a settlement with the LAUSD. Many of his students, who were all from a community of poor and immigrant families, were described to start classes very early, leave the school late, and typically achieve high scores in standardized tests. Esquith has authored books about teaching and conducted his annual class Shakespeare productions, which were featured in the 2005 documentary The Hobart Shakespeareans.

His teaching honors include the 1992 Teacher of the Year Award (given by The Walt Disney Company's American Teacher Awards), a Fellowship from Johns Hopkins University, Oprah Winfrey’s $100,000 "Use Your Life Award", Parents Magazine’s "As You Grow Award", and National Medal of Arts. Also, he was made an honorary Member of the Order of the British Empire.

== Life and career ==
After graduating from UCLA in 1981, Esquith began teaching in 1982 at Ivanhoe Elementary School. Two years later, he moved to Hobart, the second-largest elementary school in the United States. Most of the students in the school came from Central American and Korean families. According to a 2005 report on National Public Radio, 90 percent of his students were living below the poverty level, and all were from immigrant families, with none of them speaking English as a first language.

The dynamic agenda and intensive curriculum that Esquith had previously applied at Ivanhoe proved to be challenging for his pupils at Hobart. Thus, he was resolved to prove that the students of Hobart were no less capable than those anywhere else, but rather their expectations had not been set high enough.

Esquith's fifth-grade students consistently score in the top 5 to 10 percent of the country in standardized tests. Many of Esquith's students voluntarily start class at 6:30 each morning, two hours before the rest of the school's students. They volunteer to come early, work through recess, stay as late as 6:00 pm, and come to class even on vacations and holidays.

Each April, Esquith’s students perform one of Shakespeare's plays as The Hobart Shakespeareans. They have performed for the Royal Shakespeare Company, appeared at the Globe Theater in London, and were hired by Sir Peter Hall to perform A Midsummer Night's Dream at the Ahmanson Theatre in Los Angeles. They were also the subjects of the 2005 documentary The Hobart Shakespeareans.

=== Controversy ===
In March 2015, Esquith was placed on leave pending an LAUSD investigation into allegations of classroom misconduct. His lawyer named Mark Geragos, filed a formal complaint against the district, a precursor to a lawsuit. Geragos says that while the district has not clearly outlined the allegations against Esquith, after an "'initial' investigation was found to be meritless, LAUSD has taken it upon itself to manufacture new ways to defame his client. LAUSD superintendent Ramon Cortines has said "there are serious issues that go beyond the initial investigation." They later revealed that the investigation had been expanded, including the allegations of sexual abuse of a student in the 1970s who was 8 or 9 at the time, when Esquith was a teenager and employed with an afterschool program at Westside Jewish Community Center. The alleged victim said he did not report the abuse to LAUSD until 2006, and the district then reported them to LAPD. No charges were filed at the time. In October 2015, the school board voted unanimously to fire Esquith. Documents later obtained by the Los Angeles Times via the California Public Records Act included documentation of email communications with students deemed inappropriate by LAUSD. Soon after, Esquith filed a $1 billion class-action lawsuit against the LAUSD on behalf of 2,000 teachers. The lawsuit came after multiple allegations claiming the school district had fired teachers on the brink of retirement in order to save money on retirement benefits. In September 2017, the Los Angeles Unified School District settled the lawsuits with Esquith for an undisclosed sum. The arrangement included an agreement wherein Esquith would receive lifetime health benefits and that the school district would include language that better protect the rights of teachers accused of wrongdoing. The settlement went on to state that, "Mr. Esquith has tendered his resignation, effective October 31, 2015, and L.A. Unified has retroactively accepted it."

== Books ==
- There Are No Shortcuts (2003) ISBN 0-375-42202-1 – published in 2003, this book is a required reading for EDCI 205 (Exploring Teaching as a Career) at Purdue University.
- Teach Like Your Hair's on Fire (2007) ISBN 0-670-03815-6
- Lighting Their Fires: Raising Extraordinary Children in a Mixed-up, Muddled-up, Shook-up World (2009; ISBN 0-670-02108-3) – a slim (208-page) book is addressed to parents but organized around a class trip to Dodger Stadium, with sections revolving around concepts including Punctuality, Focus, Decision Making, Taking Pride in What You Do, Selflessness, Humility, Patience, and Teaching Kids to Grow.
- Real Talk for Real Teachers: Advice for Teachers from Rookies to Veterans: "No Retreat, No Surrender!" (2013; ISBN 978-0-670-01464-4)
