= Zalita v. Bush =

Zalita v. Bush (Civil Action No. 05-cv-1220) is a writ of habeas corpus filed on behalf of Guantanamo captive Abu Abdul Rauf Zalita before United States District Court judge Ricardo M. Urbina. On January 2, 2008, the Project to Enforce the Geneva Conventions named Zalita v. Bush on a list of "notable GTMO and related cases".

The United States Supreme Court's May 1, 2007 decision not to review the ruling of a lower court that the Military Commissions Act had stripped the Judicial Branch of jurisdiction over Guantanamo captives was described as a victory for the Bush Presidency. However, following its ruling in Boumediene v. Bush, which restored the Guantanamo captives' access to the US justice system the Supreme Court particularly directed the circuit court to reconsider Zalita's case.

== Military Commissions Act ==
The Military Commissions Act of 2006 mandated that Guantanamo captives were no longer entitled to access the US civil justice system, so all outstanding habeas corpus petitions were stayed.

On April 25, 2007, a request that would bar camp authorities from transferring Zalita back to Libya was denied. Zalita feared reprisals from the Government if returned to Libya. His lawyers had requested an order that would compel the executive branch to give them 30 days' notice prior to transferring him from Guantanamo—enough time for them to file a request with the court to stop the executive branch. His request was denied because the judge ruled the Military Commissions Act stripped the court of jurisdiction. The Department of Justice cited the ruling in Zalita v. Bush in its arguments when other captives made similar appeals.

Following Urbina's April 25, 2007 ruling the Center for Constitutional Rights filed an emergency injunction with the United States Supreme Court on May 1, 2007. The Supreme Court declined to consider the filing.

== Boumediene v. Bush ==
On June 12, 2008, the United States Supreme Court ruled, in Boumediene v. Bush, that the Military Commissions Act could not remove the right for Guantanamo captives to access the US Federal Court system. And all previous Guantanamo captives' habeas petitions were eligible to be re-instated. The judges considering the captives' habeas petitions would be considering whether the evidence used to compile the allegations the men and boys were enemy combatants justified a classification of "enemy combatant".

== Re-initiation ==
On December 8, 2008, Shayana D. Kadidal and other lawyers associated with the Center for Constitutional Rights and Paul E. Ohern and other Department of Justice officials submitted a Joint Status Report on behalf of Zalita and several other captives. According to the Joint Status Report he was transferred to Guantanamo in August 2002, and his habeas petition was first filed in June 2005. He fears repatriation to Libya, and has requested asylum in Switzerland. According to the Joint Status Report:

"The Government has cleared him for transfer from Guantánamo, and has twice attempted to repatriate him to Libya, the country from which he fled to Afghanistan more than a decade ago in order to avoid religious persecution. Petitioner has a credible fear that he will be subject to imprisonment, torture and possible summary execution if he is forcibly returned to Libya, and he has resisted all attempts to repatriate him to that country. He remains detained in Camp 6, an isolation facility, more than six years after his detention and nearly two years after the Government's first notice of intent to transfer him out of Guantánamo."
