= Ralph "Brigham" Young =

American politician

Ralph C. (Brigham) Young
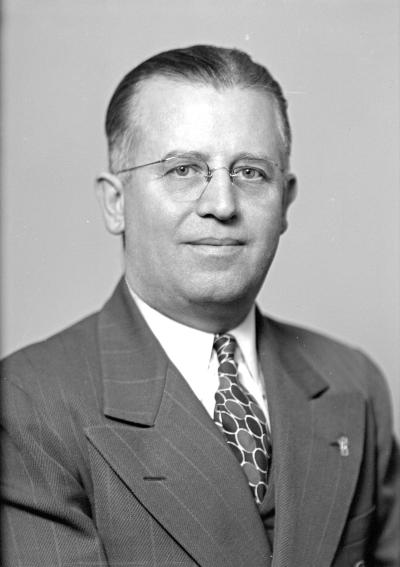
- Young in 1947

Member of the Washington House of Representatives for the 13th district
- In office 1943–1959

Personal details
- Born: August 22, 1898 Wilkinsburg, Pennsylvania, U.S.
- Died: June 13, 1967 (aged 68) Cle Elum, Washington, U.S.
- Party: Democratic
- Spouse: Mona Lyndes

Ralph C. (Brigham) Young (August 22, 1898 – June 13, 1967) was an American politician in the state of Washington. He served in the Washington House of Representatives from 1943 to 1959.
