= Raoul Weiler =

Belgian engineer (1938–2019)

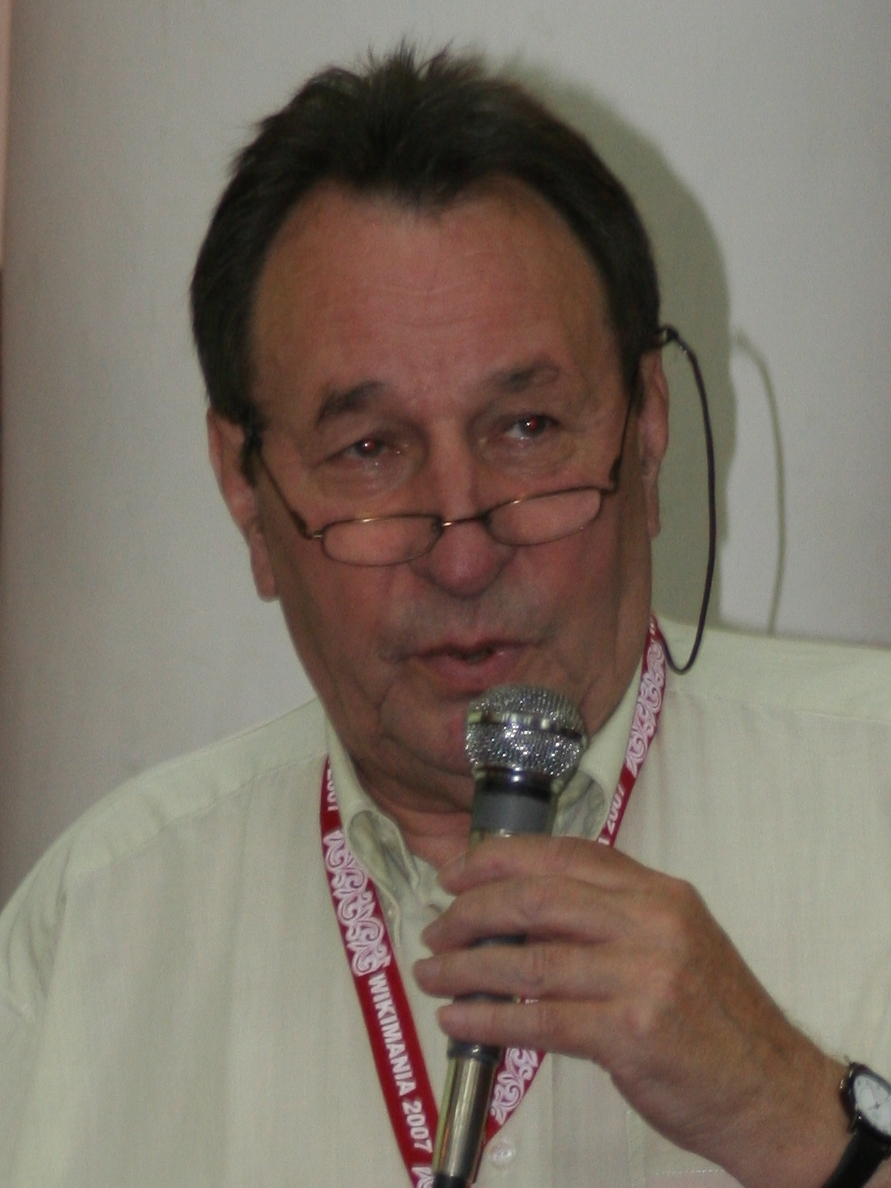
- Raoul Weiler (2007)
- Born: October 20, 1938; Anderlecht, Belgium
- Died: February 21, 2019 (aged 80); Antwerp, Belgium
- Known for: Founding President, Club of Rome (EU chapter)

Raoul Weiler (20 October 1938 - 21 February 2019) was the founding president of the EU-Chapter of The Club of Rome.

He spent several years as a post doctoral fellow at the University of North Carolina at Chapel Hill and the Catholic University of America in Washington, DC in the United States and at the Centre de la Recherche Scientifique in Paris, France. Weiler's career included applied research, engineering and information technology.

During his professional activities, mainly as an ICT manager at Bayer Antwerpen N.V., he was elected president of the Royal Flemish Engineers Association (K VIV), counting 11.000 academic engineers. He was a long-time, active founder-president of various technological working groups and president of several international symposia, conferences and the World Congress on Filtration.

Weiler lectured at different universities and taught at the University of Leuven about the relationship between technology and society for last-year students in engineering and doctoral students.

Weiler actively participated in the World Summit on the Information Society (WSIS) in Geneva and Tunis, with a variety of initiatives centered on ICT and Education, and was a member of the Advisory Board of the Wikimedia Foundation.

In 2017 Weiler published together with Kris Demuynck a book entitled "Food Scarcity Unavoidable by 2100? the Impact of Demography & Climate Change", of which a slide presentation is available.
