= Ralph, West Virginia =

Ralph
- Unincorporated community
- Location within the state of West Virginia Ralph (the United States)
- Coordinates: 38°28′38″N 80°22′7″W
- Country: United States
- State: West Virginia
- County: Webster
- Elevation: 2,005 ft (611 m)
- Time zone: UTC-5 (Eastern (EST))
  - Summer (DST): UTC-4 (EDT)
- GNIS ID: 1552580

Ralph is an unincorporated community in Webster County, West Virginia, United States.
