= Raoul III =

Raoul III may refer to:

- Ralph III of Valois († 1038)
- Raoul III of Tosny († c. 1126)
- Raoul III de Nesle († 1235)
