= Ralph Wammack =

American politician

Member of the Missouri Senate from the 23rd district
- In office 1925–?

Personal details
- Born: February 14, 1867 Stoddard County, Missouri
- Died: April 11, 1945 (aged 78)
- Party: Democratic
- Spouse: Nora White
- Occupation: politician, prosecuting attorney, lawyer

Ralph Wammack (February 14, 1867 - April 11, 1945) was an American politician from Bloomfield, Missouri, who served in the Missouri Senate. He served as Stoddard County prosecuting attorney from 1893 until 1897. Wammack was educated in Bloomfield public school system.
