= Ralph (disambiguation) =

Ralph is a masculine given name and a surname. It may also refer to:

== Places in the United States ==
- Ralph, South Dakota, an unincorporated community
- Ralph, West Virginia, an unincorporated community

== Other uses ==
- Ralph (magazine), Australian magazine published 1997–2010
- Ralph, a female Canadian pop singer
- Ralph Records, original record label of The Residents (1972–1987)
- Ralphs, American supermarket chain
- Ralph (New Horizons), a photographic instrument on board the robotic spacecraft New Horizons used to image Pluto
- Ralphing, vomiting

== See also ==
- Wreck-It Ralph, A Disney comedy film from 2012
- Ralph Lauren Corporation, a clothing brand
