= Raoul Last =

Dutch footballer

Personal information
- Date of birth: 31 May 2000 (age 26)
- Place of birth: Maastricht, Netherlands
- Height: 1.91 m (6 ft 3 in)
- Position: Left-back

Team information
- Current team: Meerssen
- Number: 15

Youth career
- –2014: MVV
- 2014–2017: Genk
- 2017–2019: MVV

Senior career*
Years	Team	Apps	(Gls)
2019–2021	MVV	30	(0)
2021–	Meerssen	68	(3)

International career
2014	Netherlands U15		
- * Club domestic league appearances and goals as of 4 August 2025

Raoul Last (born 31 May 2000) is a Dutch footballer who plays as a left-back for Meerssen.

== Career ==
Last played in the youth of MVV Maastricht, Genk and again MVV. In 2014, while at Genk, he was capped for the Netherlands national under-15 team. In the 2018–19 season, he was in the first team of MVV for a few games, but made his debut the following season. His debut took place on 26 August 2019, in the 0–1 away match against Jong PSV. Last came on for Joshua Holtby in the 92nd minute. On 29 January 2020, Last signed a contract with MVV, which would keep him at the club until 30 June 2021.

== Career statistics ==
=== Club ===
As of 28 August 2020.

Club	Season	League			Cup		Continental		Other		Total	
Club	Season	Division	Apps	Goals	Apps	Goals	Apps	Goals	Apps	Goals	Apps	Goals
MVV Maastricht	2019–20	Eerste Divisie	17	0	0	0	–		0	0	17	0
Career total			17	0	0	0	0	0	0	0	17	0
