= Abdul Rauf Khan =

Pakistani politician

Abdul Raouf Khan
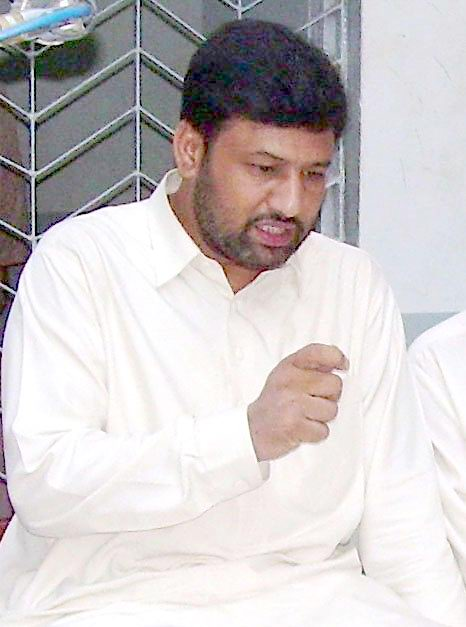
- Born: 13 May 1969 (age 57); Nawabshah, Sindh, Pakistan
- Education: Bachelor of Biology
- Occupations: Politician, Taluka City Nazim (Mayor) Nawabshah
- Parent: Abdul Ghafoor Khan

Abdul Raouf Khan is the Haqparsat Taluka City Nazim (Mayor) of Nawabshah. Khan is a member of Muttahida Qaumi Movement (MQM) of Pakistan.

== Inclusion in MQM ==
Khan joined MQM in 1986 at the age of 17. He contested in the 1996’s National Assembly election from Nawabshah NA-166.

== See also ==
- Quaid-e-Tahrik Altaf Hussain
- Sindh
