= Raoul Korty =

- Born: Raoul Korty; 9 February 1889 Vienna, Austria
- Died: 1944 Auschwitz
- Occupation: Journalist

Raoul Korty (February 9, 1889 – 1944) was an Austrian-Jewish journalist and photography collector who was murdered at Auschwitz concentration camp.

== Life ==
Raoul Korty was born in 1889, and his father was an Austrian-Jewish banker. He attended the Vienna Academy of Arts, but did not finish due to military service. In World War I, he served as an officer in the Austro-Hungarian Army.

Korty was forced to give up being a journalist after the Anschluss, and then separated from his non-Jewish wife. He had planned to emigrate, and left his photographic collection with a Viennese forwarding agency. In 1939, the Gestapo confiscated his collection and sent it to the Austrian National Library. Korty was arrested in Vienna in 1944, and was murdered at Auschwitz the same year.

== The Korty Collection ==
After the war, Korty's surviving daughter filed a motion for restitution of the photographic collection. The National Library was willing to return the photographs, but not to make any financial compensation. Eventually, the collection was forgotten. It was not until 2003 that the collection reappeared after the provenance research carried out in accordance with the Art Restitution Act of 1998. The collection was eventually purchased by the Austrian National Library

2007 saw the scientific processing of the 30,000 object collection, and the order in which Korty himself had established was retained. The results were presented in 2008 in an exhibition curated by Michaela Pfundner and art historian Margot Werner.

== The Exhibition ==
Korty preferred to collect portraits of celebrities from the late 19th and early 20th centuries: artists, theater favorites, the Austrian imperial family and European nobility, people of Viennese society, politicians and scientists. A particularly elaborate photo album with numerous photos of Emperor Franz Joseph I and his family has been preserved.
