= Raife Wellsted =

British philatelist

Raife Wellsted

Raife William Wellsted (21 July 1929 – 9 August 2012) was a British philatelist who was added to the Roll of Distinguished Philatelists in 1985.

Wellsted was appointed the third curator of the British National Postal Museum in 1980. He was suspended in December 1985 after stamps from the collection were found to be missing. He was arrested in May 1986 and jailed in 1987.

Wellsted was president of the Postal History Society in 1965 and 1981.
