= Rana Abdul Rauf =

Pakistani politician

Member of the Provincial Assembly of the Punjab
- In office 15 August 2018 – 14 January 2023
- Constituency: PP-239 Bahawalnagar-III
- In office 2008 – 31 May 2018

Personal details
- Born: 11 March 1953 (age 73)
- Other political affiliations: Pakistan Muslim League (N)

Rana Abdul Rauf is a Pakistani politician who had been a Member of the Provincial Assembly of the Punjab, from 2008 to May 2018 and from August 2018 to January 2023.

== Early life ==
He was born on 11 March 1953.

== Political career ==
He was elected to the Provincial Assembly of the Punjab as a candidate of Pakistan Muslim League (PTI) from Constituency PP-279 (Bahawalnagar-III) in the 2008 Pakistani general election.

He was re-elected to the Provincial Assembly of the Punjab as a candidate of PML-N from Constituency PP-279 (Bahawalnagar-III) in the 2013 Pakistani general election.

He was re-elected to Provincial Assembly of the Punjab as a candidate of PML-N from Constituency PP-239 (Bahawalnagar-III) in the 2018 Pakistani general election.
