= Radulf =

Radulf or Radulph may refer to:

Ordered chronologically.

- Radulf, King of Thuringia, 7th-century noble, Duke of Thuringia who proclaimed himself King of Thuringia in 642
- Radulf of Narbonne (fl. 754), Count of Nimes
- Radulf II, Duke of Thuringia (died before 880)
- Radulf of Besalú (died 920), Count of Besalú
- Radulf II, Abbot of Kinloss (died 1220)
- Radulf the Cistercian, mid-12th-century French monk who called for the killing of Jews
- Radulf of Brechin, early 13th-century bishop of Brechin

== See also ==
- Ralph (disambiguation)
- Rudolph (disambiguation)
- List of rulers of Thuringia
