= Abdul Rauf (anti-Taliban cleric) =

- Occupation: Imam
- Known for: criticizing the Taliban

Mullah Abdul Rauf is a citizen of Afghanistan and an anti-Taliban cleric. Rauf was quoted by The Washington Post on December 7, 2001. He is the imam at the Herati Mosque, a mosque in Kabul. He is notable for preaching against Taliban excesses.

In 2006 The Times quoted Abdul Rauf on music. Under the Taliban, all musical expression was prohibited. Abdul Rauf said while musical expression was allowed, enjoyment of music was not. Singing about women or violence should remain prohibited.

In March 2006, The Washington Post quoted Abdul Rauf calling for the execution of Abdul Rahman, a convert from Islam to Christianity.
