= Raoul Biltgen =

Luxembourgish actor and writer

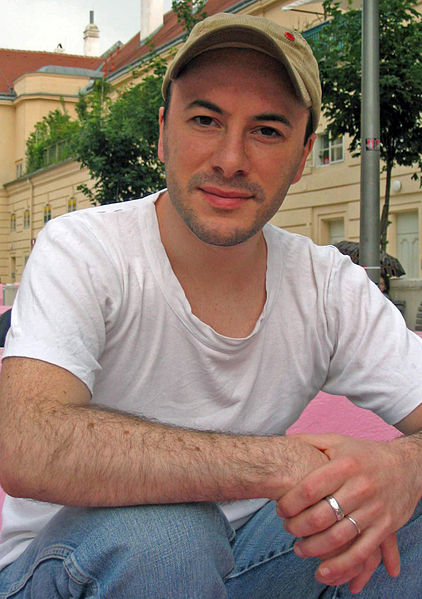
Raoul Biltgen

Raoul Biltgen (born 1 July 1974, Esch-sur-Alzette) is a Luxembourgish actor and writer.

He has written several theatrical plays and lives currently in Vienna.

== Career and Recognition ==
He has already been nominated three times for the Friedrich Glauser Prize in the "Short Crime Novel" category (2014, 2017, 2020) and once in the "Best Crime Novel" category (2018); in 2021, The Dormant Pole was awarded the Friedrich Glauser Prize for Best Short Crime Novel. For his youth play Robinson - meine Insel gehört mir, he won the 2017 Dutch-German Children's and Youth Drama Prize, awarded at the Kaas and Kappes Festival. His play The Free Fall was shortlisted for the German-language EURODRAM in 2018. His play Wolf made it onto the shortlist for the 2020 Dutch-German Children's and Youth Playwriting Prize. His play Zeugs was awarded the Audience Award of the Mülheim Children's Play Prize by the youth jury in 2022.

== Works ==
- Einer spricht: Monologe. Op der Lay, Esch-sur-Sûre 2007
- perfekt morden: Roman. Molden, Wien 2005
- Heimweg: Trilogien. Op der Lay, Esch-sur-Sûre 2000
- Manchmal spreche ich sie aus: Gedichte. Op der Lay, Esch-sur-Sûre 1999
