= Georges Doriot =

French-American professor, general and entrepreneur

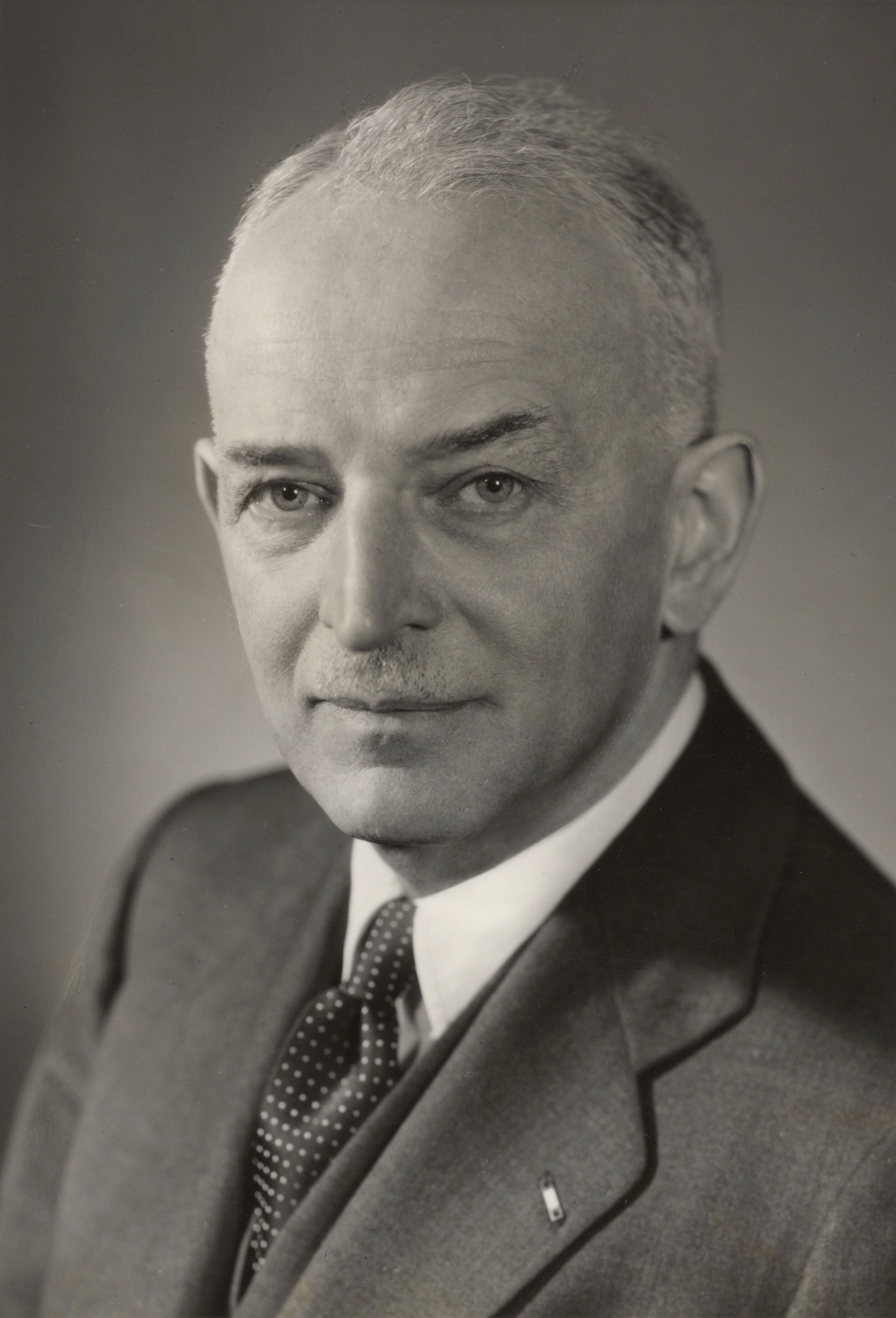
- Portrait by Fabian Bachrach, Jr., circa 1962
- Born: Georges Frédéric Doriot; September 24, 1899; Paris, France
- Died: June 2, 1987 (aged 87); Boston, Massachusetts, U.S.
- Education: University of Paris
- Occupations: Professor; Venture capitalist; Army officer
- Spouse: Edna Allen Doriot (m. 1930; d. 1978)
- Children: None
- Parent(s): Auguste Doriot; Berthe Camille Baehler
- Awards: Distinguished Service Medal; Legion of Honour; Commander of the British Empire

Georges Frédéric Doriot (English: /dɔːrˈiːoʊ/ dor-EE-oh, French: [ʒɔʁʒ fʁedeʁik dɔʁjo]; 24 September 1899 – 2 June 1987) was a French and American professor, military officer and venture capitalist.

Born in Paris, Doriot emigrated to the United States and joined Harvard Business School as a professor of industrial management. Over four decades his "Manufacturing" course trained thousands of students, many of whom became prominent business executives and venture investors.

During World War II, Doriot became a naturalized US citizen and served in the Quartermaster Corps, where he directed military procurement research covering technologies from synthetic rubber to rations. He was promoted to brigadier general and received the Distinguished Service Medal.

After the war, Doriot led American Research and Development Corporation (ARD) for twenty-five years. As president, he led the first venture capital firm to raise money from institutional investors rather than family wealth. He has been described as the "father of venture capital."

In 1957, Doriot was instrumental in founding INSEAD in his home country, France, and setting up its foundational values. INSEAD is now one of the world's leading business schools.

== Early life and education ==
Georges Frédéric Doriot was born in Paris on 24 September 1899, to Berthe Camille Baehler and Auguste Doriot, a motorist, engineer, and automobile manufacturer who owned Doriot, Flandrin & Parant (D.F.P.) and had worked closely with Armand Peugeot, the man who transformed Peugeot into a manufacturer of bicycles and, later, of automobiles. Georges was born in the Peugeot house in the 17th arrondissement. He grew up in a strict Lutheran household, and frequent childhood visits to his father's automobile factories gave him an early familiarity with manufacturing.

In 1917, at age seventeen, Doriot enlisted in the French army and served in an artillery vehicle unit, receiving a battlefield commission as an officer. He returned to his studies after the armistice and received a baccalaureate in science from the University of Paris in 1920.

The war had ruined the family's finances. Auguste Doriot's automobile plants had been converted to war production, and his attempt to restart an automotive business after the war failed for lack of backing. On his father's advice, Doriot emigrated to the United States in 1921, intending to study factory administration at the Massachusetts Institute of Technology (MIT). He carried with him a letter of introduction to A. Lawrence Lowell, the president of Harvard University, written by a family friend. The Doriots had not heard of the university, but Lowell met Doriot on his arrival in Boston and persuaded him to enroll in the new Harvard Business School instead of MIT.

Doriot spent one year at Harvard as a "special student," lacking the undergraduate degree normally required for admission. Like most of his classmates he left after the first-year core curriculum without completing the MBA, and took a position on Wall Street.

== Early career ==
In late 1921, Doriot joined New York & Foreign Development Corporation, an affiliate of the investment bank Kuhn, Loeb & Co., where the two firms shared offices at 52 William Street in lower Manhattan. His principal work was evaluating new technologies for possible investment, and he was appointed one of seven directors of a new company organized by the Kuhn, Loeb partners to develop industrial processes. He was twenty-four. During these years he also published articles in the New Republic on the repatriation of war debts.

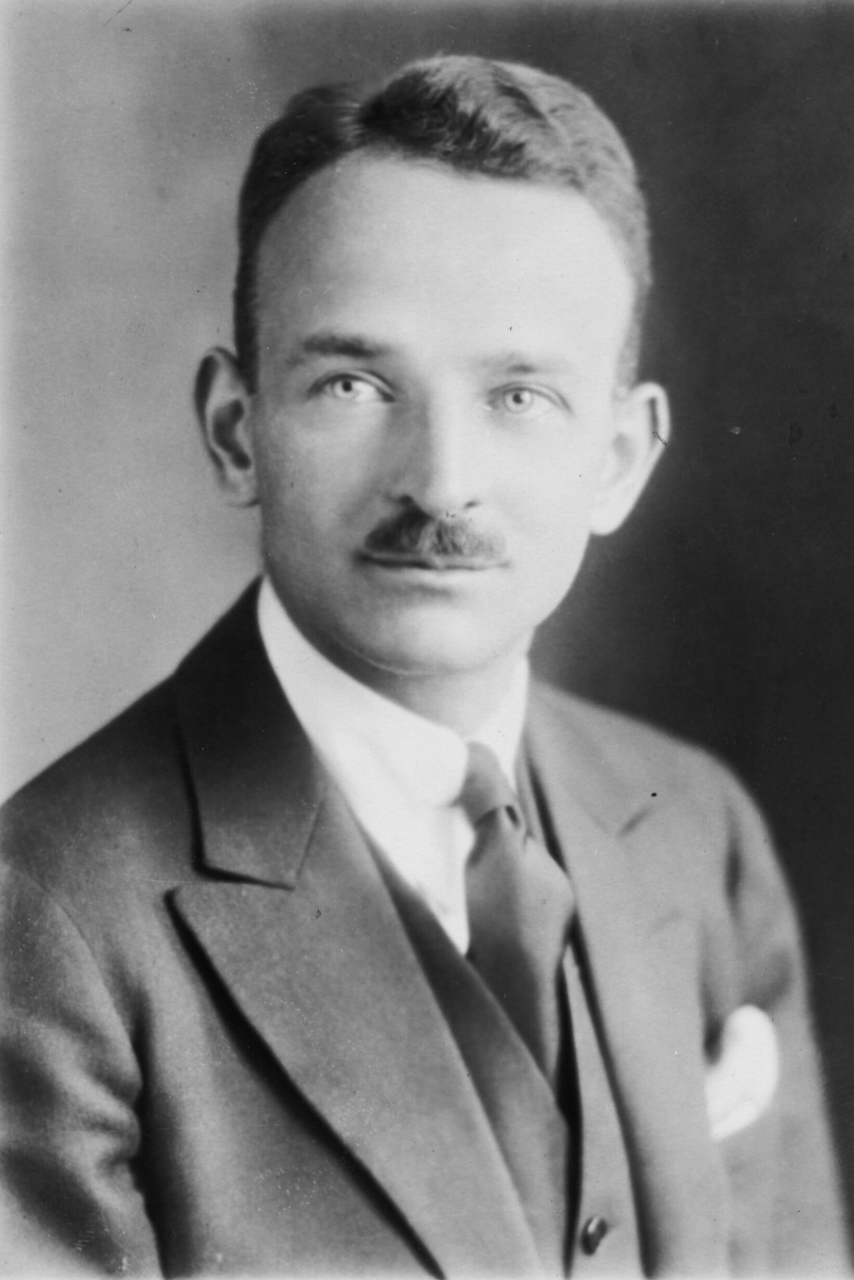
As a young Harvard faculty member (around age 26)

Kuhn, Loeb was a family firm, and its partnerships went to relatives or those who married into the family. Doriot had neither connection nor interest in accumulating the wealth that banking demanded. When Harvard Business School dean Wallace B. Donham offered him a position as assistant dean in 1925, he accepted. The assistant deanship was an administrative role, but after Doriot criticized the school's second-year course on factory production, Donham removed its instructor and told Doriot to teach it himself. Doriot would later recall that the assignment caught him off guard: "Well, I didn't know if I could teach or not. At least it was a subject that I felt close to."

In 1929, Donham promoted Doriot to full professor of industrial management. He was thirty years old and had been teaching for four years. The promotion coincided with Doriot's efforts to export American-style business education to France. He had spent the summer of 1929 at the Paris Chamber of Commerce, translating Harvard case studies and helping plan what became the Centre de perfectionnement aux affaires (CPA), an executive training program. The historian Jean-Louis Barsoux later wrote that this "may well have been the first middle management program anywhere," as Harvard itself did not offer executive education until 1943.

In 1930, Doriot married Edna Allen, a Harvard research assistant. They had no children; Morris notes that they apparently concluded they could not afford to raise a family on a professor's salary during the Depression.

=== The Depression years ===
The stock market crash of 1929 and the Depression that followed brought Doriot an extraordinary volume of consulting work. Between 1932 and 1941, he served on the boards of some twenty companies and held executive positions in ten others, an amount of outside work that would not be permitted under modern governance standards. In 1940, he became president of the struggling McKeesport Tin Plate Corporation and put it on firmer footing by negotiating the sale of its tin plate division to Jones & Laughlin.

Doriot's teaching also evolved during these years. In 1937, he adapted his courses into a new second-year elective called simply "Manufacturing," whose purpose was to train students in the analysis and administrative control of a manufacturing company with emphasis on "new products, new ideas, new developments and new questions of research." Despite its prosaic name, the course ranged broadly over leadership, entrepreneurship, and the management of innovation. It ran from 1937 until Doriot's compulsory retirement in 1966 and enrolled some 7,000 students. His graduates, known as "Doriot Men," included Philip Caldwell of Ford Motor Company, John Diebold, Dan Lufkin of Donaldson, Lufkin & Jenrette, and James D. Robinson III of American Express.

At the same time, Doriot was drawn into discussions about the economic future of New England. The region's textile and garment industries were in terminal decline, and in 1939 the New England Council formed a committee, chaired by MIT President Karl Compton, to examine how new products might reverse the trend. The committee brought together Compton, Doriot, Ralph Flanders of the Federal Reserve Bank of Boston, and Merrill Griswold of Massachusetts Investors Trust, among others. Doriot chaired the subcommittee on "Development Procedures and Venture Capital." Their work was interrupted by American entry into World War II, but the relationships formed in the committee would become the nucleus of the venture capital industry after the war.

== Military service ==
As France fell in 1940, Doriot approached the French embassy in Washington about supporting the war effort. He was offered a position as a limousine driver to the ambassador and walked out. His expertise in manufacturing had attracted the attention of American military leaders. William J. Donovan arranged a meeting with President Roosevelt, who appealed for Doriot's help improving military readiness despite his French citizenship. Doriot became a naturalized U.S. citizen in January 1940.

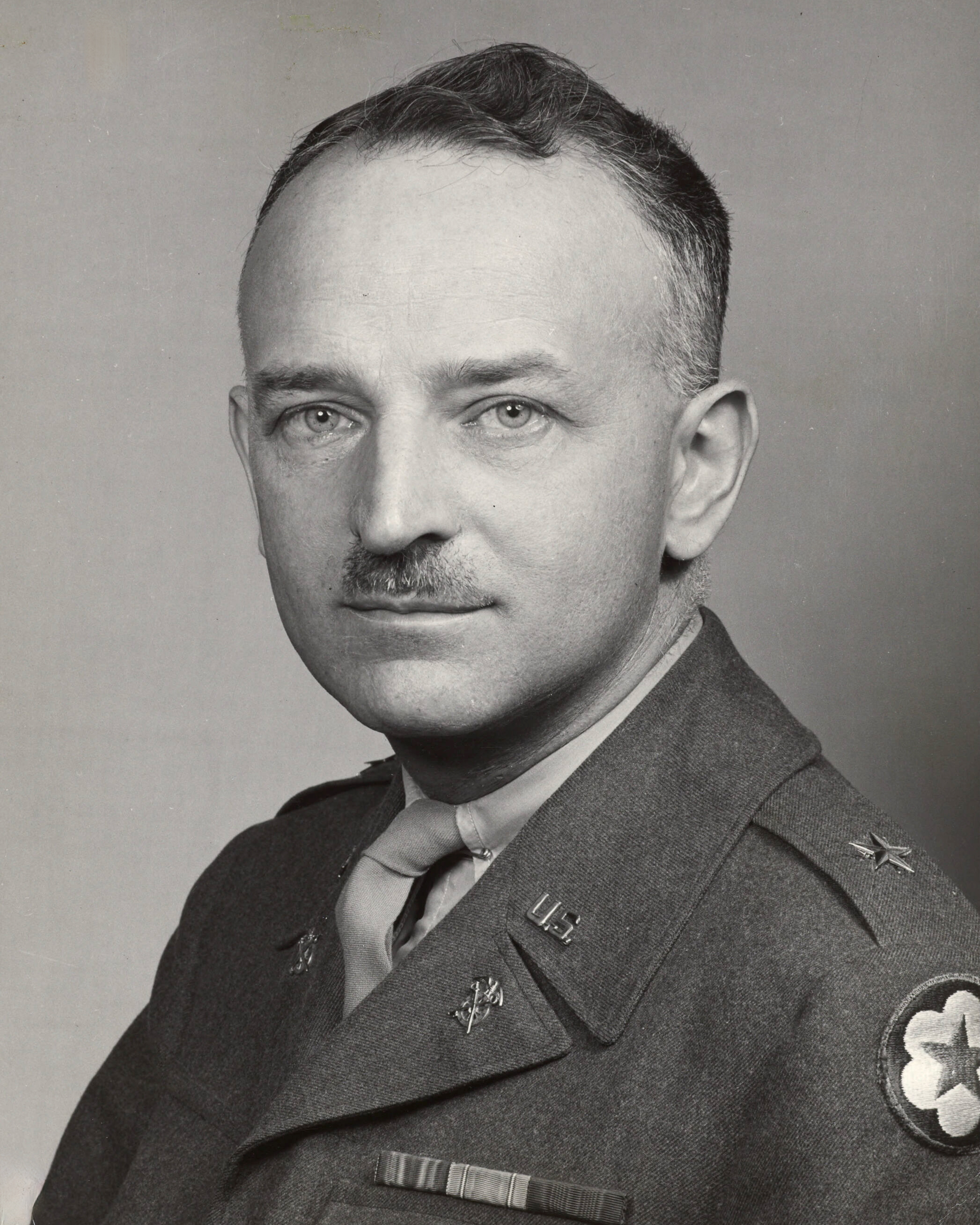
Doriot in the Quartermaster Corps (c. 1942)

In the spring of 1941, his former student Edmund B. Gregory, the newly appointed Quartermaster General, recruited him into the Quartermaster Corps as a lieutenant colonel in charge of expediting procurement. Doriot's first task was persuading Detroit automakers to retool factories for Army trucks. When Japan captured Malaya's natural rubber supply in late 1941, he turned to the rubber crisis: his February 1942 memorandum outlined what became the U.S. rubber rationing program and initiated a federal program for synthetic alternatives that Roosevelt announced publicly. The synthetic rubber industry that grew from these wartime investments now accounts for the majority of American rubber production.

In July 1942, the Quartermaster Corps created a Military Planning Division and placed Doriot over its research functions. His programs concentrated on improving conditions for ordinary soldiers: water-repellent fabrics, durable boots, insulated fatigues, and insecticides were among the innovations his teams developed or contracted. In October 1943, he was made director of the full Planning Division, a contracting organization that grew from 500 to 2,000 civilians and handled several billion dollars in procurement research, covering everything from trucks and uniforms to the Army's letter-graded field rations.

One program bore Doriot's name directly. In 1943, responding to wartime metal shortages, his division initiated development of plastic-laminated body armor. Dow Chemical manufactured plates of fiberglass and resin, which Doriot's researchers named "Doron" in his honour. The armor debuted at the Battle of Okinawa and was later adapted for pilots' flak jackets in the Korean War.

Doriot was promoted to brigadier general in February 1945, a rare distinction in the Quartermaster Corps. He was discharged in May 1946 and received the Distinguished Service Medal, followed later by appointment as a Commander of the British Empire and the French Legion of Honor.

During the Army's post-war reorganization, Doriot proposed consolidating the Quartermaster General's scattered research programs at a single facility in the Boston area. After several years of bureaucratic negotiation, the Quartermaster Research and Development Center was established in Natick, Massachusetts. The facility's Doriot Climatic Chambers, used for testing soldiers and equipment at environmental extremes, were named in his honour in 1994.

== American Research and Development Corporation ==
=== Founding ===
The wartime interruption had shelved but not killed the New England Council's plans for an organized venture capital fund. In 1943, the council held meetings with representatives of banks, insurance companies, and investment trusts to gauge their willingness to provide capital for new enterprises; all reported that their institutional mandates prevented them from making such investments directly. Ralph Flanders, who had become president of the Federal Reserve Bank of Boston, argued publicly that the nation's growing concentration of wealth in fiduciary hands left new enterprises starved for capital. "We need new strength, energy and ability from below," Flanders wrote. "We need to marry some small part of our enormous fiduciary resources to the new ideas which are seeking support."

American Research and Development Corporation (ARD) was incorporated in June 1946. Its founders included Flanders, Karl Compton, HBS dean Donald K. David, and Merrill Griswold. In December 1946, after his release from the Army, Doriot became president, a position he held for twenty-five years. Limited interest from institutional investors forced ARD to raise its initial capital through a public stock offering; the company sold roughly 140,000 shares and collected $3.5 million from insurance companies, investment trusts, university endowments at MIT, Rice, Penn, and Rochester, and individual investors. It was the first venture capital enterprise to raise capital from institutions rather than family wealth.

=== Investment philosophy and early portfolio ===
Doriot's approach to investing was shaped by his experience as an educator and board member more than by financial theory. He emphasized the quality of founders over the quality of business plans. "An average idea in the hands of an able man is worth much more than an outstanding idea in the possession of a person with only average ability," he wrote in ARD's 1949 annual report. He considered venture capital's purpose to be "not one of 'making money' but rather financing 'noble' ideas," and he referred to portfolio companies as "members of the family," resisting pressure to sell successful investments for a quick return.

ARD required board seats in its portfolio companies and provided management guidance alongside capital, a practice that became known as the "Doriot style" and anticipated what later venture capitalists would call "value-added" investing. Over its lifetime, the firm reviewed nearly 6,900 proposals and funded about 150 companies, an acceptance rate that never exceeded four percent in any five-year period. ARD concentrated on technology-based ventures, particularly in fields where patents could protect small firms against established competitors: chemicals, scientific instruments, electronics, and industrial equipment accounted for roughly three-quarters of its investments.

ARD's first major investment was in High Voltage Engineering Corporation, a company founded by MIT physicists to build particle accelerators for cancer treatment and nuclear research. Karl Compton personally recommended the investment, reportedly telling Doriot that the company "probably won't ever make any money, but the ethics of the thing and the human qualities of treating cancer with X-rays are so outstanding that I'm sure it should be in your portfolio." When High Voltage went public in 1955, ARD's original $200,000 investment was worth $1.8 million.

=== Digital Equipment Corporation ===
ARD's defining investment came in 1957, when Kenneth Olsen and Harlan Anderson, engineers at MIT's Lincoln Laboratory, sought funding for a company to build smaller, cheaper computers. General Dynamics turned them down because they had no business experience; the Small Business Administration in Boston referred them to ARD, then the only venture capital firm in the city. Doriot's staff coached Olsen and Anderson before their board presentation, offering three pieces of advice: avoid the word "computer," since Fortune had reported that nobody was making money in computers; promise profit margins higher than five percent; and promise fast results, since most board members were elderly. Olsen and Anderson renamed their venture from Digital Computer Corporation to Digital Equipment Corporation.

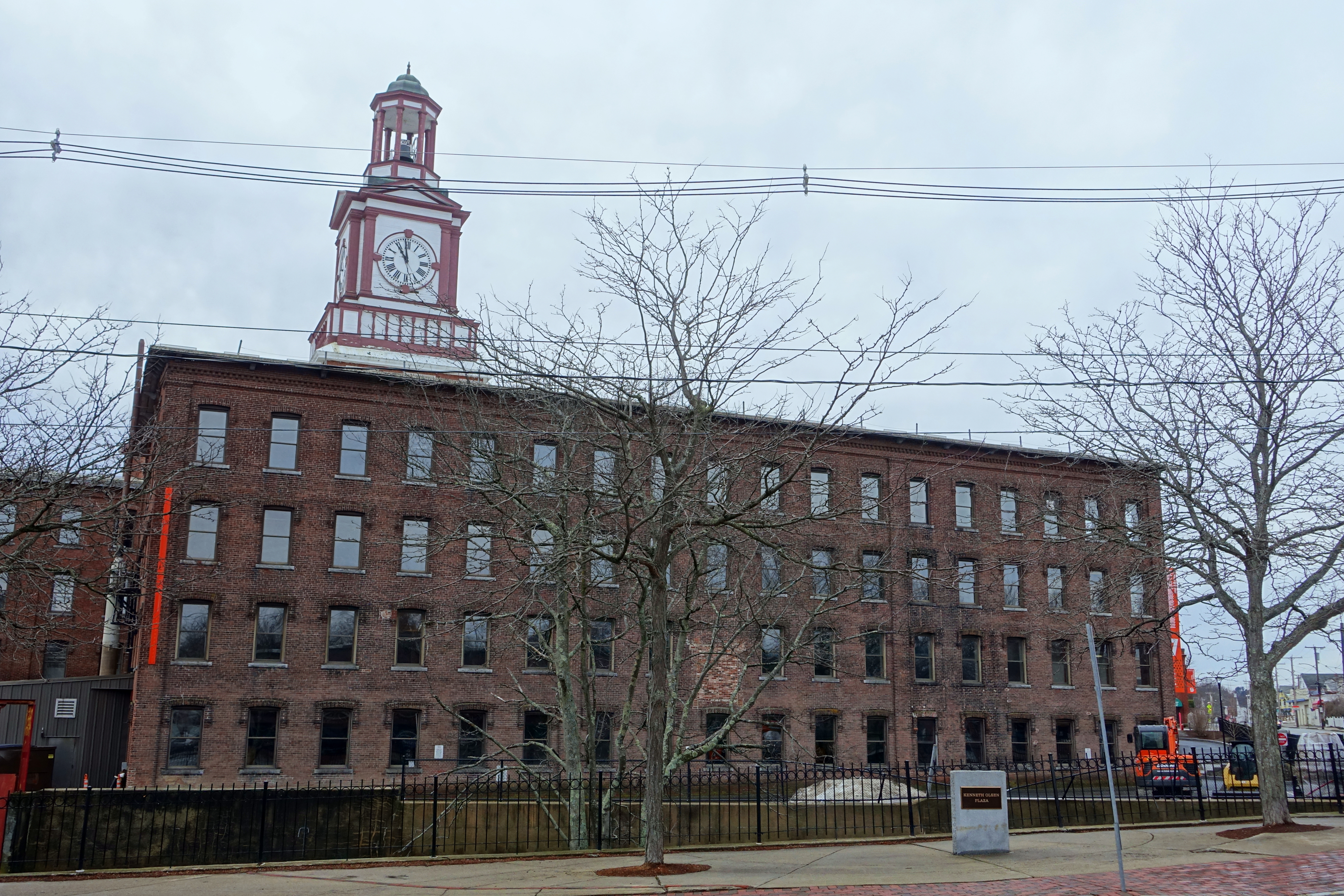
DEC's Maynard headquarters in a former textile mill

ARD invested $70,000 for a 77 percent equity stake. Doriot assigned Dorothy Rowe, ARD's assistant secretary, to serve as Digital's first treasurer, and stocked its board with five ARD advisors. He involved himself closely in Digital's non-technical affairs, holding board meetings at ARD's Boston office rather than at Digital's plant in Maynard. He counselled Olsen on presentation and salesmanship, advising him to display circuit boards on purple velvet "like a jeweler" rather than laying them on a desk. Olsen never hired a senior person without Doriot's input, though he also maintained that ARD "gave us freedom" and "didn't interfere, either when things were going poorly, or when things were going well."

Doriot's temperamental affinity with Olsen reinforced the relationship. Both men were driven more by the satisfaction of building than by wealth. Doriot habitually warned entrepreneurs against buying "twenty-cylinder Cadillacs" and "fifty-room mansions," but Olsen drove a Ford, cut his own lawn, and after becoming a multimillionaire, splurged on a second canoe. Doriot refused multiple acquisition offers for Digital from firms including Xerox and Hewlett-Packard, betting the company could prosper independently. Olsen credited this patience as Doriot's defining contribution: "It's very hard for someone who owns a major part of the stock to be patient. The General really preached this and really practiced it." ARD's $70,000 stake in Digital grew to a market value of $355 million by 1971, a return that validated Doriot's model of patient, hands-on venture investing.

=== Regulatory constraints and decline ===
ARD had been organized as a publicly traded closed-end fund, registered under the Investment Company Act of 1940. This structure, chosen because institutional investors were initially reluctant to commit capital, created problems that compounded over time. The Act's conflict-of-interest provisions prohibited ARD from granting its staff stock options in portfolio companies. In the early years, when the sums involved were small, the restriction was tolerable. As ARD's investments appreciated, it became crippling.

The compensation gap was stark. After one portfolio company, Optical Scanning, went public, its CEO's net worth rose from nothing to $10 million; the ARD vice president who had managed the investment received a $2,000 raise. Doriot battled the SEC over the issue for years. At one point he drafted a three-page memo attacking the agency's lack of understanding, but never sent it. An SEC ally, Lawrence Greene, had briefly allowed options on affiliate companies in the 1950s, but his successors reversed the policy.

The result was a steady loss of talent to competing firms that could offer equity participation. William Elfers, a fifteen-year veteran and Doriot's heir apparent, left in 1965 to found Greylock Capital, organized as a limited partnership that could share investment gains with its partners. Henry Hoagland followed in 1969 to start Fidelity Ventures, and William Congleton departed in 1971 to co-found Palmer Partners. All three chose the limited partnership form, which was free from the SEC regulations that constrained ARD. Nicholas observes that by the late 1960s, publicly traded stocks made up 98 percent of ARD's portfolio, and the firm no longer resembled a venture capital operation.

Morris argues that Doriot's failure to solve the compensation problem reflected personality as much as structural constraints. Doriot could have taken ARD private or organized affiliated limited partnership funds, as the West Coast firm Draper, Gaither & Anderson had done in 1959. Instead, he used his own modest lifestyle as a model and worried aloud that his employees would lose motivation if they grew wealthy too quickly, fearing they would spend much time at leisure.

Doriot also proved unwilling to plan his succession. When ARD's board established a "Committee on 70" to manage the leadership transition, Doriot evaded the process. With no plan in place, the board accepted a merger with Textron in 1972. DEC shares were distributed to ARD's existing shareholders. Doriot remained chairman of the ARD subsidiary until 1974, but the division made few new investments and was disbanded in 1976.

== INSEAD ==
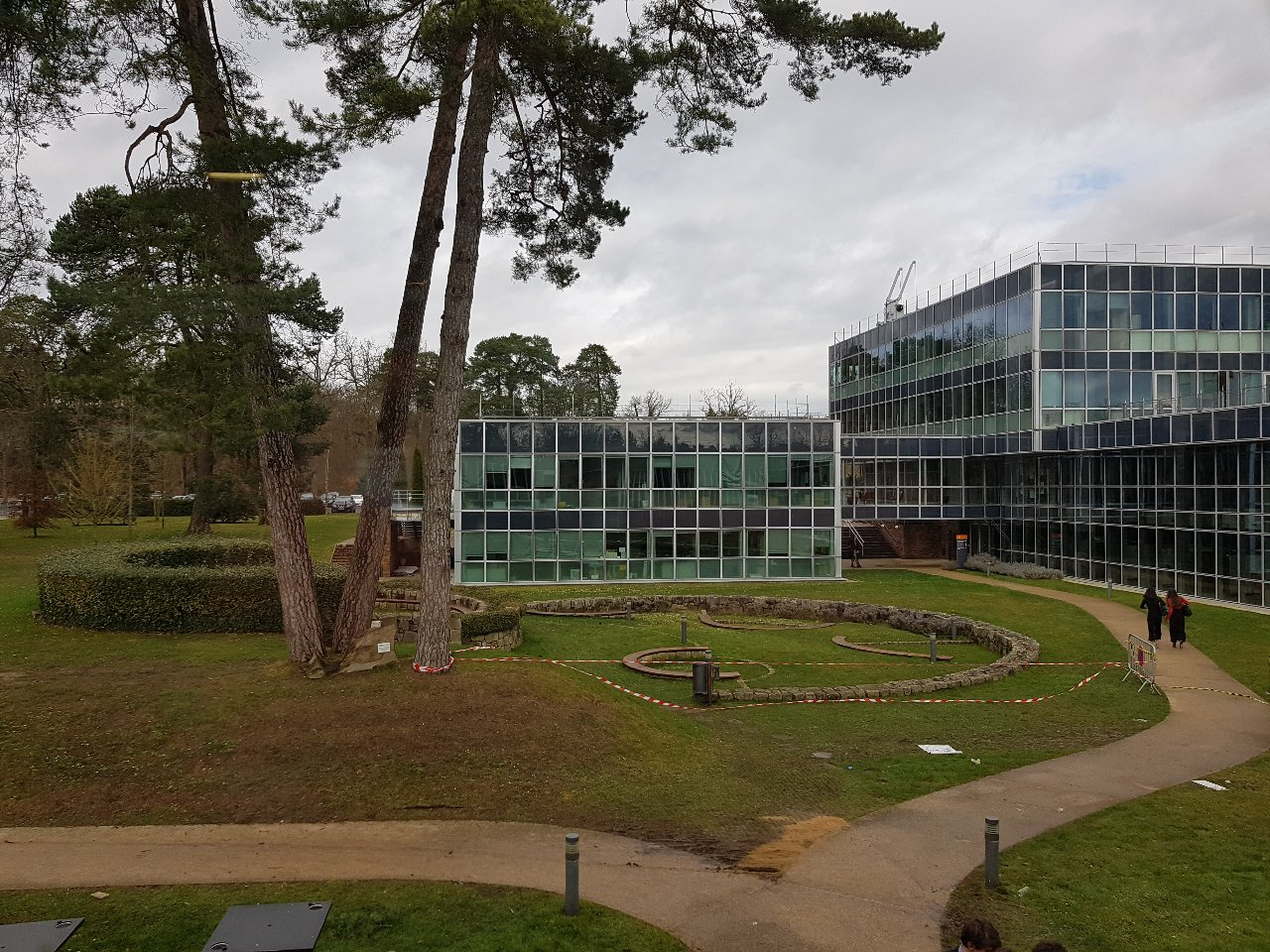
INSEAD, Fontainebleau campus

Doriot's interest in European business education predated ARD. His work establishing the Centre de perfectionnement aux affaires in Paris in 1930 had demonstrated that the case method could be transplanted across the Atlantic. After the war, his experience of two world conflicts deepened a conviction that business education could help bridge Europe's historically hostile nations. He envisioned a graduate school that would bring together students from different countries, including former enemies, to rebuild economies and promote cooperation.

Through the early 1950s, Doriot lobbied the Paris Chamber of Commerce and recruited former Harvard students living in France to build support for the project. Claude Janssen, who had graduated from HBS in 1955, became one of his principal agents; Janssen's social connections gave him access to Jean Marcou, the chamber's treasurer and soon its president. Olivier Giscard d'Estaing, brother of the future French president Valéry Giscard d'Estaing, was another early convert who brought political networks. Industrial backing came from Count Raoul de Vitry d'Avaucourt of Pechiney and Hely d'Oissel of Saint-Gobain.

In July 1957, the Paris Chamber of Commerce agreed to establish the school. Staffing proved difficult; no one was hired to lead the school until early 1958, and the opening was pushed back to September 1959. The school initially operated from the Château de Fontainebleau after Giscard d'Estaing arranged to use space vacated by an American art school during the academic year. The first MBA class of fifty-seven students, drawn from fourteen countries, began on 12 September 1959.

At the official dedication ceremony on 9 October 1959, the Director General read a letter from U.S. President Dwight D. Eisenhower extending congratulations to "all those who have taken part in the establishment of this Institute which is destined to play a creative role in the economic affairs of Europe and the world." Doriot had raised roughly $123,000, about 18 percent of the school's initial donations, from American donors including former students, Morgan Guaranty, and Pepperidge Farm founder Margaret Rudkin.

INSEAD (Institut Européen d'Administration des Affaires) moved to its permanent campus near Fontainebleau in 1967 and has since become one of Europe's top-ranked business schools.

== Death and legacy ==
Doriot died of lung cancer on 2 June 1987 in Boston. He was eighty-seven. He had smoked a pipe throughout his adult life.

ARD's influence on the venture capital industry extended well beyond its own portfolio. Several of its alumni founded firms that became industry leaders: Greylock Partners, Fidelity Ventures, and Palmer Partners all traced their origins to ARD professionals who left to form limited partnerships. Doriot's students at Harvard also entered venture investing; Arthur Rock, who took the Manufacturing course in 1951, went on to finance Fairchild Semiconductor and Intel. Tom Nicholas writes that ARD "created the standard venture capital paradigm" of selecting companies on behalf of outside investors and providing governance alongside capital.

At the same time, ARD's trajectory illustrated the importance of organizational form. Its structure as a public company under the Investment Company Act created regulatory burdens that limited partnerships could avoid, and the inability to share gains with investment staff proved fatal to the firm's ability to retain talent. The limited partnership, pioneered by ARD's own alumni, became the dominant vehicle for venture capital from the 1970s onward.

== See also ==
- History of private equity and venture capital
- American Research and Development Corporation

== Archives and records ==
- Georges F. Doriot research papers at Baker Library Special Collections, Harvard Business School
- Georges F. Doriot American Research and Development papers at Baker Library Special Collections, Harvard Business School
- Georges F. Doriot papers at Baker Library Special Collections, Harvard Business School

== Sources ==
- Ante, Spencer E. (2008). Creative Capital: Georges Doriot and the Birth of Venture Capital. Cambridge, MA: Harvard Business School Press. ISBN 978-1-4221-0122-3.
- Barsoux, Jean-Louis (2000). INSEAD: From Intuition to Institution. Basingstoke: Macmillan. ISBN 978-0-333-80398-1.
- Bylinsky, Gene (August 1967). "General Doriot's Dream Factory". Fortune: 103–108, 130–136.
- Gompers, Paul A. (1994). "The Rise and Fall of Venture Capital" (PDF). Business and Economic History. 23 (2): 1–24.
- Hsu, David H.; Kenney, Martin (2005). "Organizing Venture Capital: The Rise and Demise of American Research & Development Corporation, 1946–1973" (PDF). Industrial and Corporate Change. 14 (4): 579–616. doi:10.1093/icc/dth064.
- Morris, Charles R. (2015). "Georges F. Doriot: 1899–1987: Dream Builder". Wall Streeters: The Creators and Corruptors of American Finance. Columbia University Press. pp. 140–156. doi:10.7312/morr17054.14.
- Nicholas, Tom (2019). "The Market versus the Government". VC: An American History. Cambridge, MA: Harvard University Press. pp. 107–143. ISBN 9780674248267.
