= The Money of Invention =

The Money of Invention: How Venture Capital Creates New Wealth
- Author: Paul A. Gompers; Josh Lerner
- Language: English
- Subject: Venture capital
- Publication date: 2001
- Publication place: United States

The Money of Invention: How Venture Capital Creates New Wealth is a non-fiction book about venture capital, written by Paul A. Gompers and Josh Lerner, Professors of Business Administration at Harvard Business School. The book was first published in 2001 by the Harvard Business School Press. It is considered one of the best studies about the venture capital industry in the United States.

== Overview ==
The Money of Invention is a non-technical overview of the venture capital (VC), written for a general audience who wants to understand how VC industry works.

The book is composed of three major sections. The first section focuses on the perspective of the entrepreneurs, the second on the venture capitalists, and the third on what Gompers and Lerner call 'the emulators', organizations that try to copy the venture capital model.

In the first section, the authors identify the challenges entrepreneurs face when trying to raise capital: (1) uncertainty about the future. (2) information gaps about the new product and the market for it; (3) the predominance of soft assets (e.g. patents, trade secrets), in contrast to hard assets (e.g. land, equipment) that are easier to finance; and (4) the volatility of the product- and financial market conditions. The authors then explain how VCs addresses these problems: screening mechanisms, due diligence, staged financing, syndicated investment, executive compensation rules, financing covenants like convertible debt, and corporate governance mechanisms are some of the solutions employed and discussed in the book.

In the second section, the authors focus on venture capital organizations. This section is part a historical account about the VC industry in United States, beginning with the founding of the first modern VC firm, American Research and Development Corporation, by MIT president Karl Compton and HBS professor Georges Doriot, in 1946. It also explores subsequent VC booms to the federally guaranteed Small Business Investment Companies Program in the 1960s and the 1974 Employee Retirement Income Security Act, allowing a "prudent man" to hold some high-risk investments and increasing the flow of institutional money into the VC business. This section also describes the ways in which venture capital is structured, connecting its success to the limited partnership structure (e.g. management fees, carried interests, contractual restrictions); the mechanisms to raise funds and the emergence of the fund of funds; and the challenges of the regulators to grapple with its information gap problems. The section closes with a detailed study of the overshooting phenomena that explains the volatility of the returns of the industry.

The third section of the book looks at efforts to apply the principles of venture investing in corporate, public sector, educational, and international settings. The authors argue that the lack of adequate compensation schemes and organizational structures usually limit the success of the venture capital model in these settings.

== Reviews ==
Randall Morck, an academic in the field, says that the book is "accessible to undergraduates and MBAs with little economics and to the general reader", but recommends The Venture Capital Cycle (Paul Gompers and Josh Lerner 1999, Cambridge: MIT Press) from the same authors for a high-level academic treatment of the same issues. He further states that the book may be interesting to economists, explaining that "the familiar problems of agency cost, information asymmetry, adverse selection, and moral hazard assume overarching importance in the VC business." He praises the book for giving "clarifying to these problems", being useful to "counterweight the more traditional presentation of these issues".

Reviewers also say that the authors "are strong supporters of the venture capital model", and hence "the reader is left with little doubt that the VC business has managed the trick at least tolerably well." George Kingston points out that the book was published prior to the stock market downturn of the internet bubble and "it does not address the impact of these events on venture capital".

== Publishing information ==
- Gompers, Paul A.; Lerner, Josh (2001). The Money of Invention: How Venture Capital Creates New Wealth. Cambridge: Harvard Business School Press. ISBN 1-57851-326-X.
