= M-1952 Flak Jacket =

American flak jacket

Armor, Body, Fragmentation, Protective, Vest Type, M-52
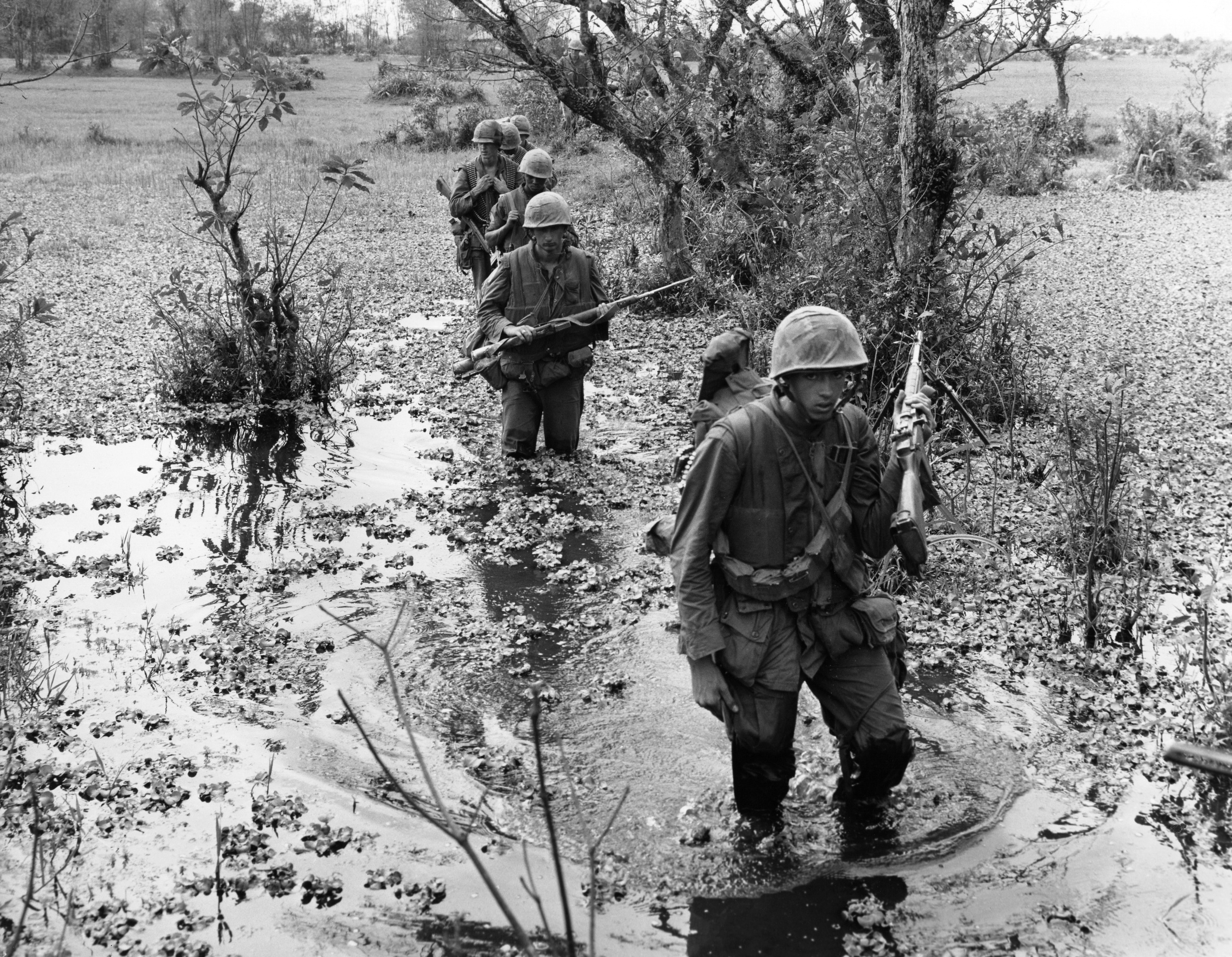
- 1967, 27 February, Company C, 9th Marines, Operation Chinook
- Type: Flak jacket
- Place of origin: United States

Service history
- In service: 1952–1980
- Used by: See Users
- Wars: Korean War; 1958 Lebanon Crisis; Vietnam War

Specifications
- Weight: 8.5 pounds (~3.8 kg)

The M-1952 Flak Jacket was an American flak jacket introduced in 1952. It was used during the Korean and Vietnam Wars.

== History ==
The M-1952 Flak vest, or "Armor, Body, Fragmentation, Protective, Vest Type, M-52" was a flak vest designed for the United States Marine Corps during the Korean war. Following the joint U.S. Army and Marine Corps designed M51 Flak Jacket, the M-52 used aluminum plates instead of Doron.

== Design ==
The M-1952A Body Armor was a 8.5 pound vest composed of twelve layers of flexible laminated nylon. It had epaulets, a zip front closure and adjustable elastic draw cords on each side. It had cargo pockets with the left one having a pen compartment.

== Combat use ==
The Marine Corps first used the M-1952 during the Korean War. It reached frontline troops in late 1952, and only in relatively small quantities. They continued to use it throughout the 1958 Lebanon Crisis and during the early stages of the Vietnam War. The M-1952A was also adopted by the U.S. Army.

The U.S. Navy used them quite heavily in Vietnam, including with their Mobile Riverine Force. The M-1952 was phased out of use by the M-1955 vest during the Vietnam War. The Marine Corps used the vest into the 1980s during training.

== Users ==
=== Former users ===
- Croatia: Used during the Croatian War of Independence.
- United States: Formerly used by the United States Army, United States Marine Corps, and United States Navy.
- South Korea: Formerly used by the Republic of Korea Army and Republic of Korea Marine Corps during the Vietnam War.
