= Alan David Lourie =

American judge (born 1935)

Alan Lourie
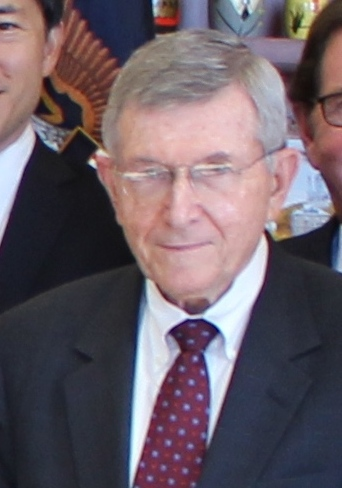
- Lourie in 2013

Judge of the United States Court of Appeals for the Federal Circuit
- Incumbent
- Assumed office April 6, 1990
- Appointed by: George H. W. Bush
- Preceded by: Daniel Mortimer Friedman

Personal details
- Born: Alan David Lourie; January 13, 1935 (age 91) Boston, Massachusetts, U.S.
- Education: Harvard University (BA); University of Wisconsin, Madison (MS); University of Pennsylvania (PhD); Temple University (JD)

Alan David Lourie (born January 13, 1935) is a United States circuit judge of the United States Court of Appeals for the Federal Circuit.

== Education and career ==
Born in Boston, Massachusetts, Lourie received an BA degree from Harvard College in 1956, a Master of Science in Organic Chemistry from the University of Wisconsin in 1958, a Doctor of Philosophy in Chemistry from the University of Pennsylvania in 1965, and a Juris Doctor from Temple University School of Law in 1970. He was a Chemist for Monsanto Corporation from 1957 to 1959, and then chemist and Patent Agent for Wyeth Labs in Radnor, Pennsylvania from 1959 to 1964. He was in-house counsel to SmithKline Beecham Corporation from 1964 to 1990.

== Federal judicial service ==
On January 24, 1990, Lourie was nominated by President George H. W. Bush to a seat on the United States Court of Appeals for the Federal Circuit vacated by Judge Daniel Mortimer Friedman. Lourie was confirmed by the United States Senate on April 5, 1990, and received his commission on April 6, 1990.

== Notable cases ==
On August 29, 2025, Lourie voted to strike down Trump's tariffs in V.O.S. Selections, Inc. v. Trump. Out of the seven judges who voted to strike down the tariffs, Lourie was the only judge appointed by a Republican president.

== Patent outlook ==
He has been described as having a "pro-patent outlook" in the book Innovation and its Discontents by Harvard Business School professor Josh Lerner and by Brandeis University economics professor Adam B. Jaffe.

== See also ==
- List of United States federal judges by longevity of service

Legal offices
Preceded by Daniel Mortimer Friedman	Judge of the United States Court of Appeals for the Federal Circuit; 1990–present	Incumbent
