= WeShow =

American online video aggregator

- Type: Inc.
- Founded: February 15, 2007
- Founder: Marcos Wettreich; Bruno Parodi
- Headquarters: New York, New York, United States
- Key people: Marcos Wettreich CEO, 2007; Bruno Parodi
- Number of employees: 80 (2007)
- Website: www.weshow.com

WeShow was a New York City-based online video aggregator that delivered tailored video content to viewers around the world. The WeShow editorial team selected videos found on the internet and organized them across 200 categories. User suggestions for content to be included were also entertained. Common video repositories used to source content included YouTube, Dailymotion, Metacafe, MySpace, and Google Video. WeShow did not serve as a social networking site, unlike some similar services, not supporting either video rating or comments. Voting for favorite videos, though, was supported through the WeShow Awards facet, which allowed voting on a selected set of videos each month leading to two top videos. WeShow TV was another facet, which highlighted daily new video content.

Marcos Wettreich and Bruno Parodi founded WeShow in February 2007 and launched portals for the United States, the United Kingdom, and Brazil in July 2007.

The premise on which the company was founded rests on findings from Kelton Research that American's viewing of online video was limited by the overwhelming volume available and the "dreaded" task of finding specific content in this mass, 96% of the time ending in failure. The company had financial backing from Bob Pitman via The Pilot Group, and Bill Sahlman. In September 2007, WeShow launched websites in France, Germany, and Spain. In December 2007 WeShow debuted in Japan, and in January 2008 a portal specially dedicated to China was created.
