= Innovation and Its Discontents =

2004 book

Innovation and Its Discontents: How Our Broken Patent System Is Endangering Innovation and Progress, and What To Do About It
- Author: Adam B. Jaffe, Josh Lerner
- Language: English
- Genre: Non-fiction
- Publisher: Princeton University Press
- Publication date: 2004
- Publication place: United States
- ISBN: 0-691-11725-X

Innovation and Its Discontents: How Our Broken Patent System Is Endangering Innovation and Progress, and What To Do About It is a book (ISBN 0-691-11725-X) by Adam B. Jaffe and Josh Lerner. Princeton University Press published the book in 2004.

The authors of the book outline changes made to the patent system in the United States in the late 1980s and early 1990s which they say has led to a situation in which patents have become extremely powerful economic weapons and are being issued irresponsibly and at an unreasonable rate.

The result, the authors claim, is that American innovation is being stifled unintentionally as a result of a few simple bureaucratic changes (centralizing the appeal to the United States Court of Appeals for the Federal Circuit and making patent application fees the primary source of revenue for the United States Patent and Trademark Office). The authors argue that the establishment of the CAFC has led to judicial "tunnel vision"; because the judges of the CAFC are only asked to rule on matters of intellectual property, they come to value the current patent system too highly and tend to side disproportionately with patent-holders.

The authors frame the current debate about patents in historical terms, citing both times when patents were freely granted as royal favors, such as the Elizabethan era in England, as well as times when patents were impossible to obtain, or in the case of the Netherlands in the 1830s, completely abolished.

== See also ==
- Sealed crustless sandwich
