= Dorothy Rowe (venture capitalist) =

American venture capitalist

- Born: c. 1917; United States
- Died: November 30, 1989 (aged 71–72); Boston, United States
- Education: Syracuse University
- Occupations: Venture capitalist, business executive
- Known for: Senior vice president of American Research and Development Corporation (ARD)

Dorothy E. Rowe (c. 1917 – November 30, 1989) was an American venture capitalist and corporate executive who served as senior vice president of American Research and Development Corporation (ARD), one of the first publicly traded venture capital firms in the United States. She was the first treasurer and a director of Digital Equipment Corporation (DEC), the first VC unicorn (finance).

== Early life and education ==
Rowe graduated from Syracuse University with a degree in home economics. During World War II, she served as a lieutenant in the U.S. Navy's Bureau of Ordnance.

== Career ==
Rowe joined ARD in 1949 at the request of its president, Georges Doriot. Initially serving as an administrative assistant to Doriot, he promoted her to assistant secretary by 1952 and added her to the core VC investment team. Contemporaries noted that she wielded considerable influence within the firm. Brian Brooks, an auditor with Lybrand, Ross Brothers & Montgomery, recalled that "business was her whole thing" and that she "could deal with any of these business people."

When ARD invested $70,000 in Digital Equipment Corporation in 1957, Doriot asked Rowe to serve as the company's first treasurer and then also as director. She was also one of four ARD employees—along with Henry Hoagland, William Congleton, and Wayne Brobeck—to receive founders' shares in Digital, an investment that would become the venture capital industry's most celebrated success.

Rowe rose to the position of senior vice president at ARD and served on the boards of several ARD portfolio companies. She advocated for maintaining confidentiality around portfolio company financials, arguing that premature public disclosure would disadvantage ARD's ability to attract promising ventures. In 1972, following Textron's acquisition of ARD, Doriot wrote in a confidential memo that Rowe knew "ARD better than anyone else." In 1975, Rowe departed the firm along with Patricia Clark, marking the end of an era for the original ARD team.

Near the end of her career, Rowe told the Boston Globe that she supported equal pay for equal work but had "never had any discrimination on that score myself." Economist Tom Nicholas has noted that Rowe's advancement to a senior role at ARD was exceptional given president Georges Doriot's "strong gender bias."

== Later life ==
Rowe served as a trustee of Emerson College and as vice president and trustee of the French Library in Boston. She died on November 30, 1989, at Massachusetts General Hospital in Boston at age 72. She was survived by two sisters, Barbara DuBois and Mary Edith Parfitt.

== Sources ==
- Ante, Spencer E. (2008). Creative Capital: Georges Doriot and the Birth of Venture Capital. Boston: Harvard Business Review Press. ISBN 9781422101223.
- Nicholas, Tom (2019). VC: An American History. Cambridge, MA: Harvard University Press. ISBN 9780674248267.
