= American Research & Development Corporation =

American venture capital firm

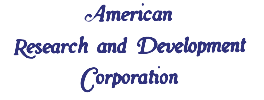
- Type: Public
- Traded as: NYSE: ARD
- Industry: Venture capital
- Founded: June 6, 1946; 80 years ago
- Founders: Karl Compton; Ralph Flanders; Georges Doriot
- Defunct: 1976
- Fate: Merged with Textron (1972)
- Headquarters: Old John Hancock Building, Boston, Massachusetts, United States
- Area served: United States
- Key people: Georges Doriot (president); Henry Hoagland (SVP); Bill Elfers (SVP); Dorothy Rowe (SVP)

American Research & Development Corporation (ARD) (Note: The company's legal name was American Research and Development Corporation. In its time, it was commonly known as American Research & Development and abbreviated as ARD or AR&D.) was an American investment firm founded in Boston in 1946. Considered the first modern venture capital firm in the United States, the firm set industry precedents by combining institutional capital with professional selection and oversight of early-stage ventures.

ARD emerged from efforts led by MIT president Karl Compton and Boston Federal Reserve president Ralph Flanders, who concluded that a dedicated fund for new industries could reverse New England's industrial decline. Georges Doriot, a Harvard Business School professor, served as president for its 25-year existence. The firm was organized as a publicly traded closed-end fund, raising $3.5 million from insurers, investment trusts, and university endowments in its initial offering. Returns from its first investments, particularly High Voltage Engineering Corporation and Ionics, convinced ARD to focus on research-based ventures.

The firm's 1957 investment of $70,000 in Digital Equipment Corporation (DEC) became the defining success of early venture capital. DEC developed the minicomputer and grew to become Massachusetts' largest employer and the United States' second-largest computer maker; ARD's stake reached $355 million by 1971. Over its lifetime, ARD generated annualized returns of 14.7 percent, half of which came from the investment in DEC.

ARD faced mounting competition from limited partnerships, which could offer equity compensation to investment professionals in ways SEC regulations prohibited for public companies. After failing to establish a succession plan, the firm merged with Textron in 1972 and ceased operations in 1976. Several ARD alumni founded influential venture firms, including Greylock Partners and Fidelity Ventures, while Doriot's former students financed Fairchild Semiconductor and Intel.

== Organization ==
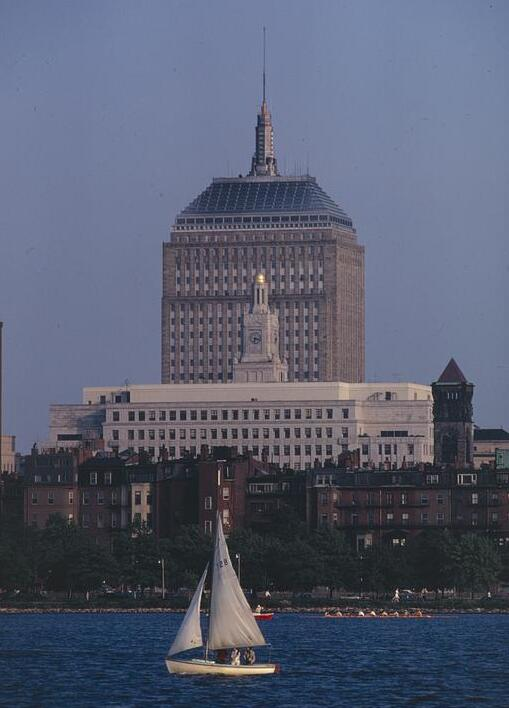
ARD occupied Floor 23 of Boston's old John Hancock building

ARD has been described as the "first true venture capital firm": it was the first American firm to choose companies on behalf of investors, rather than drawing from family wealth. (Note: Subsequent writings on ARD make similar characterizations. Tom Nicholas describes ARD as "the first VC firm to access the resources of institutional investors"; David Hsu and Martin Kenney call it "the first organized venture capital firm and, more importantly, the first to raise its funds from institutional investors and the public"; Jamison and Waite note ARD "was the first to pursue capital from nonfamily funds.") Earlier venture investors like J.H. Whitney & Company and Rockefeller Brothers deployed family wealth through hired staff; ARD raised capital from insurers, investment trusts, and university endowments, then made investment decisions through a small team of salaried professionals. The principle that outside investors would supply capital while professionals selected firms became the template for the modern venture capital industry.

ARD was organized as a closed-end fund under Section 12(d)(1) of the Investment Company Act of 1940, giving it a permanent capital base. The founders chose this structure because venture investments required patience, and a closed-end fund faced no redemption pressure from shareholders. ARD's average investment horizon was 6.5 years, with some requiring a decade or longer.

In this and several other respects, ARD differed from modern venture firms. It was a publicly traded company, subject to SEC disclosure requirements that portfolio companies found burdensome. It had no mechanism to share investment gains with staff; SEC rules prohibited the stock options that later became standard in limited partnerships. And its closed-end structure created pressure to generate current income. ARD financed many investments through convertible debt or convertible preferred stock rather than common equity, and charged management fees to portfolio companies.

=== Investing approach ===
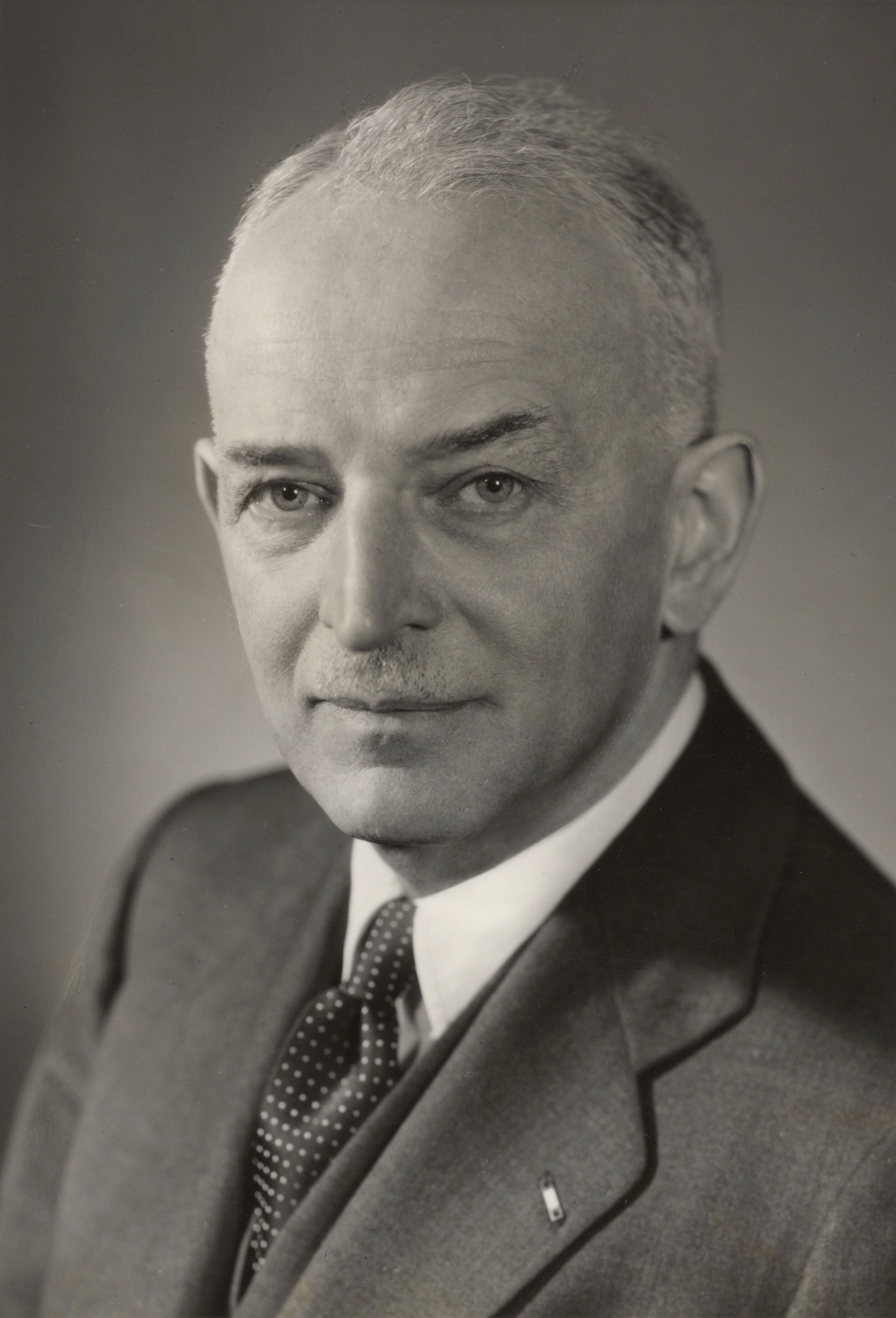
Doriot, ARD president

Georges Doriot's approach emphasized founders over their business ideas. "An average idea in the hands of an able man is worth much more than an outstanding idea in the possession of a person with only average ability," he wrote in ARD's 1949 annual report. ARD documentation stated its intent "to invest only in situations and companies where able management by men of competence and integrity seems assured." Doriot asserted that "in practically no case have we had what I would call a technical failure. It has been human failures."

ARD was highly selective. Over its lifetime, the firm reviewed nearly 6,884 proposals and funded 120 companies, a lifetime acceptance rate of 1.7 percent, which never exceeded 4 percent in any five-year period. ARD concentrated on technology-based ventures, particularly in fields where patent protection could help small firms compete against established corporations. 73 percent of its investments were in R&D-intensive sectors: chemicals, scientific instruments, industrial equipment, and electronics. In its first five years over three-quarters of ARD's investments were in Massachusetts or the eastern seaboard, reflecting both the founders' regional development mission and the practical advantages of local governance.

ARD required board representation to monitor investments and intervene when necessary. Doriot or other ARD officers joined the boards of portfolio companies; Karl Compton and Merrill Griswold served on Tracerlab's board, while Doriot and Compton sat on the boards of High Voltage Engineering and Ionics. This "Doriot style" of active investment meant providing advice and assistance without unduly restricting founders' autonomy.

ARD staged its investments, providing limited initial capital and additional funding only as companies demonstrated progress. Doriot explained the rationale: "in the hands of an inexperienced person commitments of all types are often made quite recklessly and capital has a way of disappearing at a remarkable high rate of speed." When necessary, ARD took more drastic measures—it acquired voting control of Circo Products in 1950 and replaced top management after three years of stagnation.

Companies funded by ARD were considered "members of the family," and Doriot was reluctant to sell them. His formula was to exit only when "hope seems gone" or when "all is right but not outstanding" or when "the best growth period is behind." This patience reflected his conviction that venture capital's purpose was "not one of 'making money' but rather financing 'noble' ideas." ARD's founders also understood that a diversified portfolio could tolerate failures if a few investments succeeded dramatically.

== Origins ==
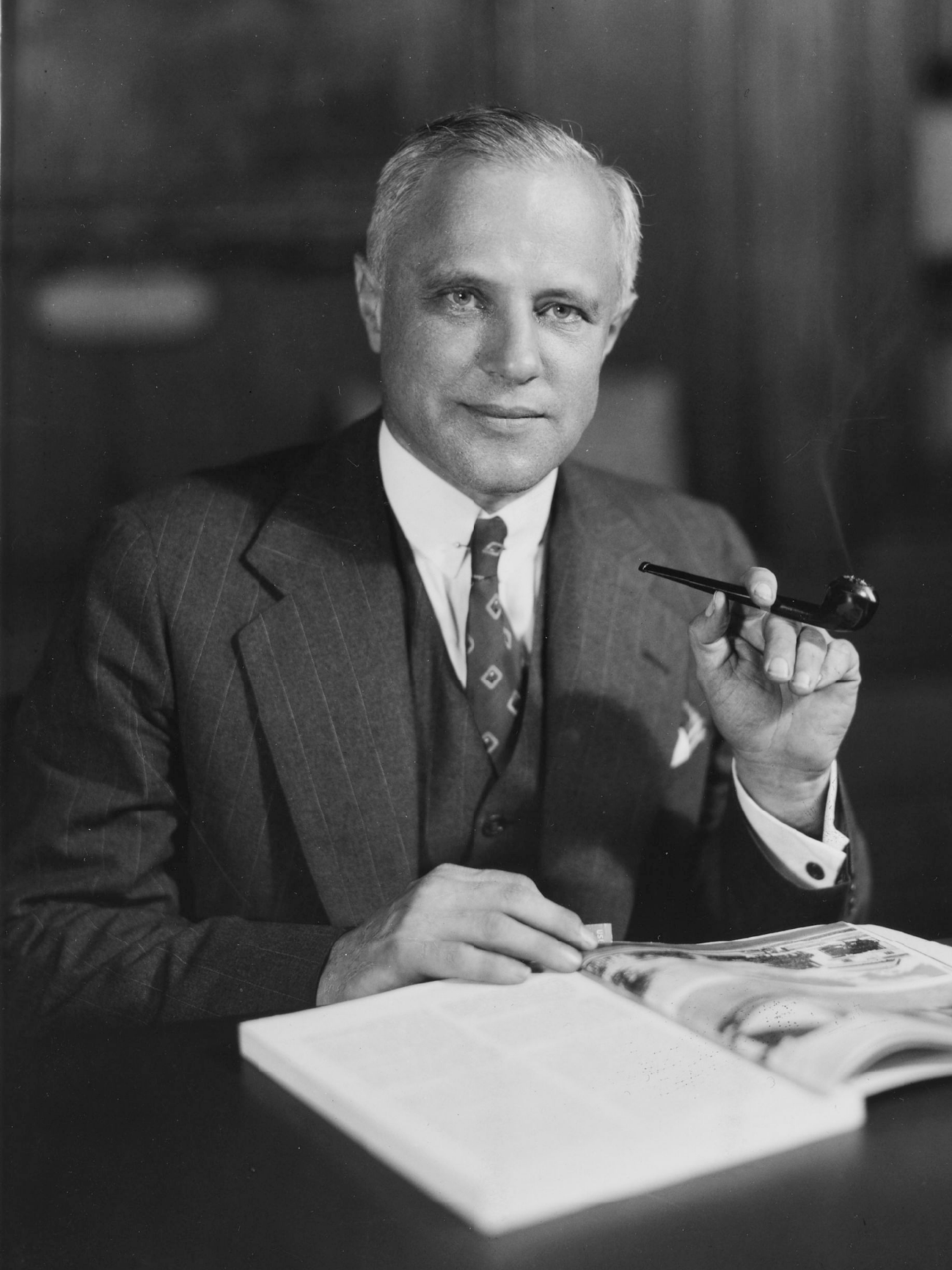
Karl Compton, President of MIT

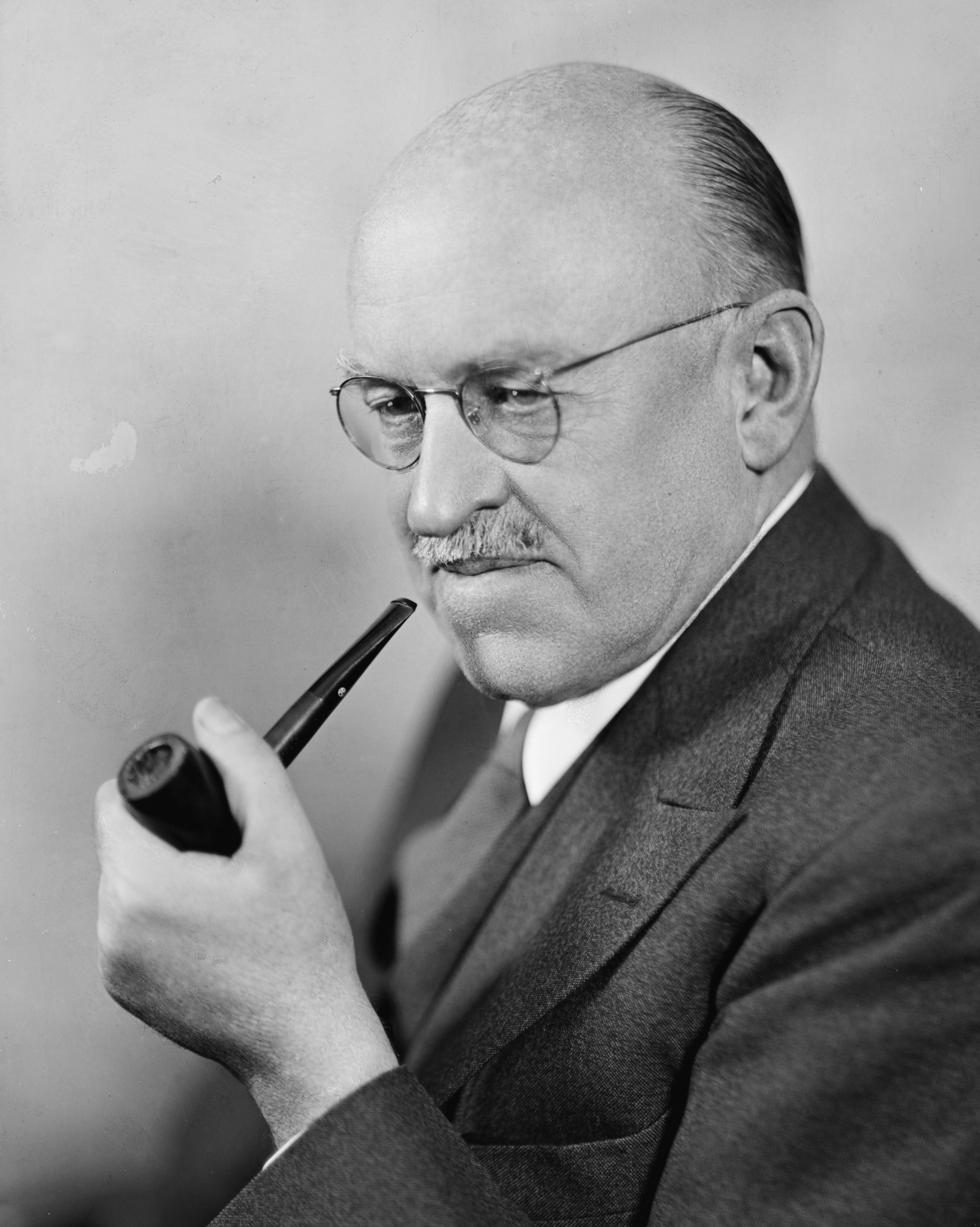
Ralph Flanders, President of the Boston Federal Reserve

ARD emerged from concerns about New England's economic decline. The textile and manufacturing industries that had anchored the region were leaving for the South, and employment in Massachusetts cotton manufacturing alone fell from 124,000 in 1919 to under 30,000 by 1940. Civic leaders sought mechanisms to commercialize research from local universities—particularly MIT—as a basis for industrial revival.

Karl T. Compton, a physicist who became MIT's president in 1930, believed scientific research could drive regional growth. In 1934 he proposed a program called "Put Science to Work," arguing against prevailing sentiment that blamed labor-saving technology for unemployment. "New industries are like babies," Compton wrote in the New York Times Magazine: "they need shelter and nourishment, which they take in the form of patent protection, financing, and the chance of reasonable profits. But, before all, they need to be born, and their parents are science and invention."

The New England Council, a regional business association, embraced the idea and asked Compton to chair a "New Products Committee" in 1939 to examine how technology might reverse industrial decline. The committee brought Compton together with Ralph Flanders, an industrialist and president of the Council; Merrill Griswold, chairman of Massachusetts Investors Trust; Donald David, dean of Harvard Business School; and Georges Doriot, a Harvard Business School professor who chaired a subcommittee on "Development Procedures and Venture Capital."

The committee identified a structural problem: approximately 45 percent of New England wealth was held by banks, insurers, and trusts legally barred or culturally averse to risky investments. Capital was not scarce, but the capacity to evaluate startups was. As Griswold explained, his firm would "under no circumstances directly make investments in risky new undertakings for the reason that we are not staffed for that purpose." The committee concluded that a specialized intermediary could bridge this gap. By assembling a diversified portfolio, the new firm could assure that even if several investments failed, "the others, the hope is, will more than make up for it."

World War II suspended these plans but reinforced the case for organized venture capital. Doriot served as a brigadier general directing research and development for the Army Quartermaster General. Compton worked with the Office of Scientific Research and Development, which coordinated wartime research producing radar, mass-produced penicillin, and the atomic bomb. Federal research spending concentrated technical expertise in the Boston area. Appointed president of the Boston Federal Reserve in 1944, Flanders became further convinced that lack of financial support for new industries would harm postwar prosperity. In 1944, he proposed a new corporate entity to ensure a "reasonably high birth rate of new undertakings." Following the Japanese surrender, Compton gathered his colleagues from the New Products Committee and persuaded them to act.

== Company history ==
=== Postwar launch ===
ARD was incorporated on June 6, 1946. The founders' first choice for president was Doriot, but he remained in Army service. In the interim, they named him chairman and installed Flanders—then running for the U.S. Senate—as acting president. When Flanders won his Senate race in November and Doriot was released from the Army in December, Doriot assumed the presidency.

ARD required SEC exemptions from the Investment Company Act of 1940 to proceed. The Act restricted investment companies from owning controlling stakes in portfolio firms. (Note: Section 12(e) provided an exemption for entities "furnishing capital to industry" that the SEC granted, likely owing to the founders' stature and their focus on institutional investors.) The firm sought $5 million through a public offering at $25 per share. Wall Street was skeptical and major underwriters declined, viewing ARD as "more of a social experiment than a profit-seeking entity." Two second-tier investment houses agreed to sponsor the offering, but only on a "best-efforts" basis—they would attempt to sell the shares but would not backstop any shortfall with their own capital.

By February 1947, ARD had raised $3.5 million. Half of its capital came from the Massachusetts Investors Trust, John Hancock Life Insurance, and four university endowments: MIT, Rice University, the University of Pennsylvania, and the University of Rochester. Individuals, primarily directors and associates, provided the rest.

=== Early investments and operations ===
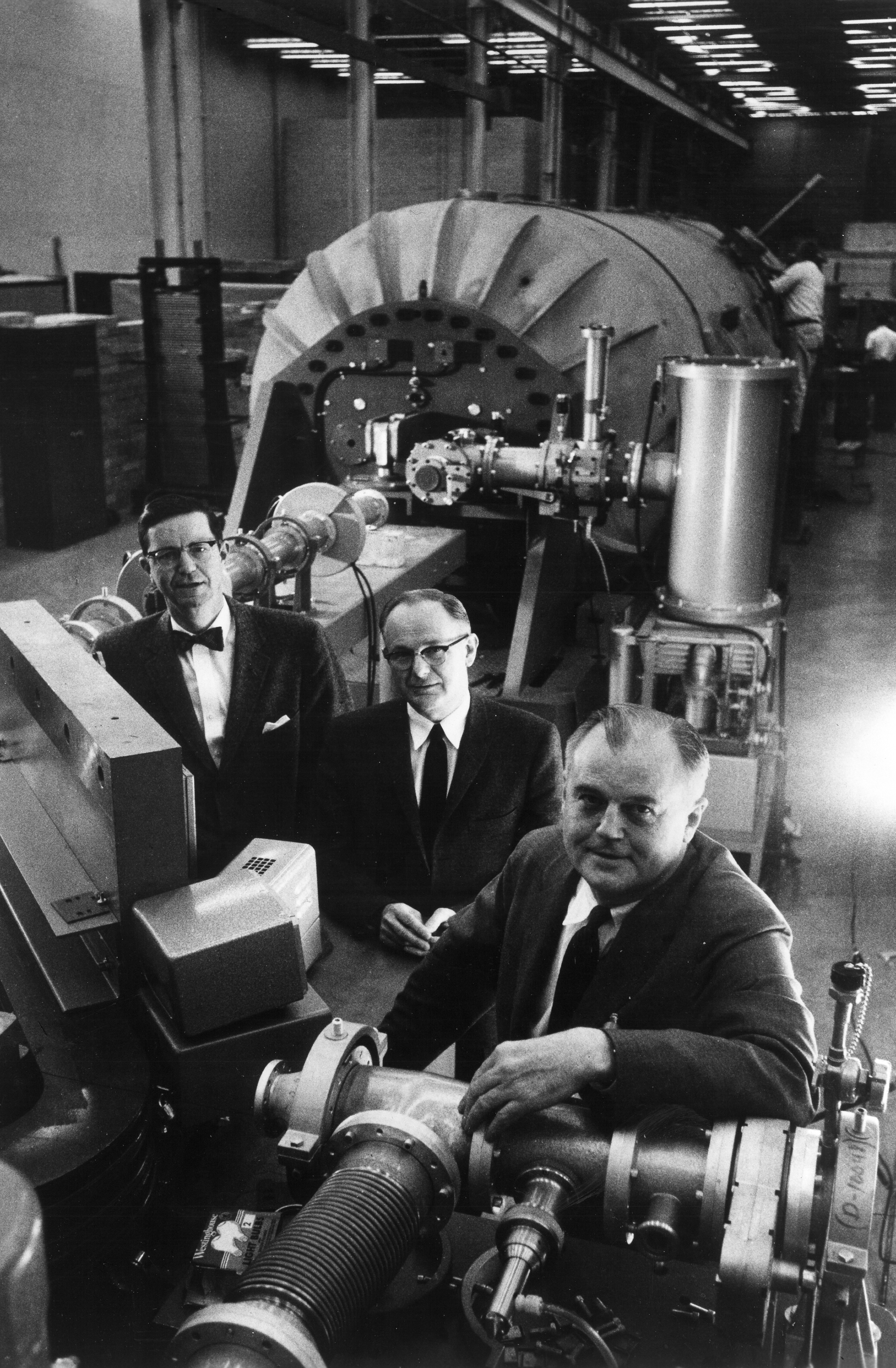
High Voltage Engineering Corporation founders with a tandem particle accelerator

In late 1946, ARD's first investments reflected both its mission and limited capitalization. Two investments were in startups developing new technologies. Tracerlab, founded by MIT graduate William Barbour to manufacture radiation measurement equipment, was near bankruptcy after being rejected by Boston investors and refused Wall Street terms demanding 51 percent equity. ARD provided $150,000 on more favorable terms. High Voltage Engineering Corporation, founded by two MIT faculty to develop particle accelerators for cancer treatment, received $200,000 and began operations in a garage near Harvard Square. (Note: ARD provided $200,000 of High Voltage's initial $250,000 capitalization, receiving 48 percent of outstanding stock. The founders retained 40 percent.) ARD made a third investment of $150,000 in Circo Products, a Cleveland company developing automobile transmission solvents—not a startup but an established company filing patents since the 1930s. (Note: The Circo investment was structured as a loan at 5 percent interest, convertible into preferred stock—generating immediate income rather than pure equity.)

ARD's management proved highly selective: between 1946 and 1950, they evaluated 1,869 proposals and made 26 investments. In 1947, ARD lost $55,000, and only two of eight portfolio companies were profitable. Some investments failed outright—Circo Products collapsed after a supplier discontinued a critical chemical. (Note: ARD took voting control of Circo in 1950, installed new management, and pivoted to manufacturing hose clamps.) Yet the growing success of High Voltage and Ionics convinced ARD's directors that early-stage technology companies represented the best opportunities. In 1948, ARD had invested in Ionics, a company developing membranes for desalinating seawater; when Doriot sought a reality check from Dow Chemical, its engineers initially dismissed the technology as impossible, until the founder mailed them a working membrane. (Note: Ionics was originally located in a basement on the MIT campus, with the university covering infrastructure and ARD financing wages and working capital.) ARD also placed officers or directors on portfolio company boards, an unusual practice at the time. By 1951, combined portfolio sales reached $40 million with 3,000 employees, and ARD recorded its first operating profit. ARD director Merrill Griswold told Fortune: "Some of our friends began to say, 'Oh, Lord, not another longhair project. Why doesn't ARD back something commercial and make some money.' We learned our lesson. Now we realize that our best things are longhair."

Despite these operational milestones, ARD struggled to generate attractive returns for shareholders. Between 1946 and 1956, ARD's net asset value per share grew at 5.2 percent annually, against 8.9 percent for the S&P Composite Index. (Note: ARD's market price, reflecting its persistent discount to NAV, showed a −1.3 percent annual return even including dividends. ARD's shares often traded below net asset value, reaching a 65 percent discount in 1955.) The flow of proposals slowed from 382 annually between 1947 and 1951 to only 127 in 1954; that year, ARD made no new investments. In 1955, MIT sold its entire ARD holdings. By 1956, ARD had under $1 million in available capital and reported its first operating loss in five years.

=== Digital Equipment Corporation ===
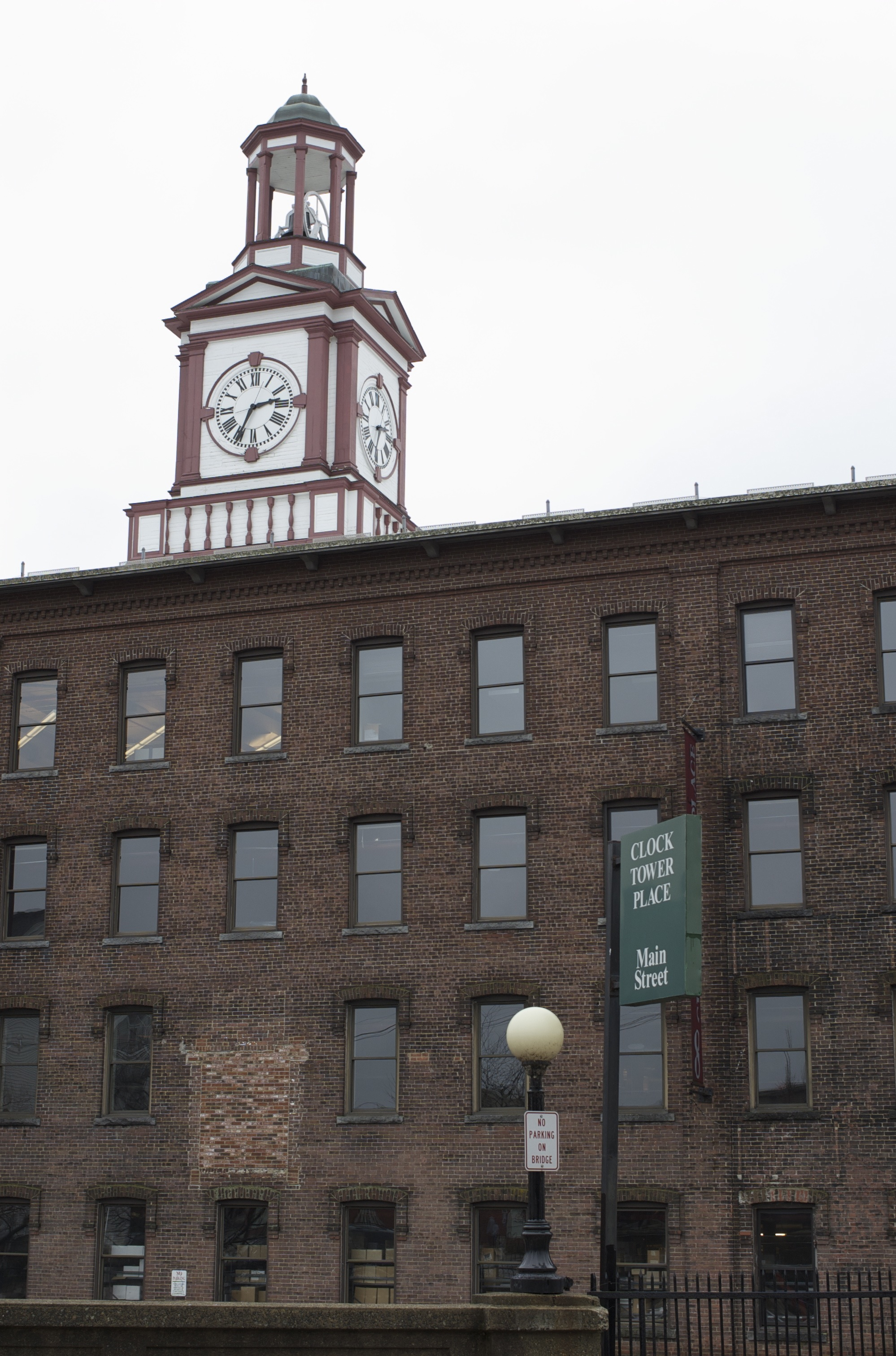
DEC's wool mill headquarters in Maynard

In summer 1957, Kenneth Olsen and Harlan Anderson, two MIT engineers from Lincoln Laboratory, approached ARD with a proposal to build cheaper, smaller computers that could challenge IBM's mainframes. After IBM and other established companies rejected them, they submitted a business plan to ARD.

The founders sought $100,000. ARD offered $70,000 in equity for 70 percent of the company, with a $30,000 loan to follow. With no other offers, they accepted. In August 1957, they incorporated Digital Equipment Corporation and began operations in a former woolen mill in Maynard, Massachusetts. It was ARD's only new investment that year. ARD took board seats and assigned Dorothy Rowe, a Navy veteran who had risen from administrative assistant to assistant secretary, as DEC's first treasurer. Olsen later recalled that ARD "gave us freedom. They didn't interfere, either when things were going poorly, or when things were going well."

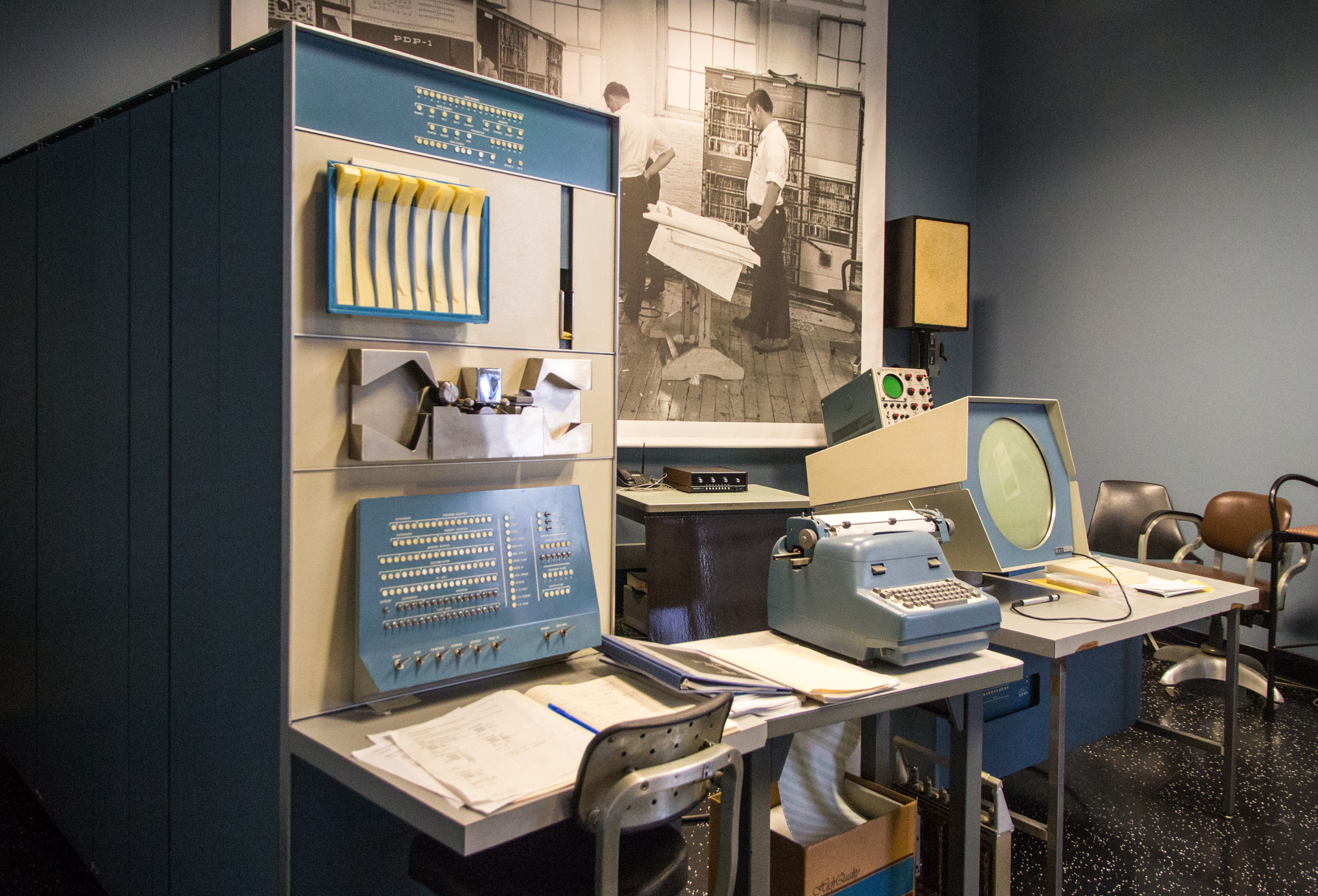
DEC's breakthrough product, the PDP-1

DEC's breakthrough came with its programmed data processor (PDP) series. The PDP-1, introduced in 1960, sold for $120,000—a fraction of mainframe prices. In 1965, the PDP-8 dropped to $18,000, becoming the first mass-produced minicomputer. On August 19, 1966, Lehman Brothers led an initial public offering at $22 per share; ARD's 65 percent stake was valued at $38.5 million. By 1971, that stake was worth $355 million.

DEC became Massachusetts' largest employer and the US's second-largest computer manufacturer behind IBM. Over its 25-year life, ARD generated an annualized return of 14.7 percent; without DEC, that figure would have been 7.4 percent. The small investment became synonymous with the venture capital "home run."

=== Competitive pressures and decline ===
ARD faced intensifying competition beginning in 1958 with the creation of Small Business Investment Companies (SBICs) under federal legislation. These government-backed entities could leverage private capital with federally subsidized loans and received advantageous tax treatment; by the mid-1960s, approximately 700 SBICs operated nationwide. ARD was offered the first SBIC license, but Doriot declined. He viewed debt financing, particularly with government money, as incompatible with venture capital.

More directly competing were venture capital limited partnerships. The first non-family partnership, Draper, Gaither and Anderson, formed in Palo Alto in 1959. The limited partnership structure avoided ARD's fundamental problems: profits passed directly to investors without double taxation, general partners received both management fees and carried interest, and the ten-year fund life created clear performance incentives. Most critically, limited partnerships could compensate investment professionals through equity participation in ways SEC regulations prevented ARD from doing.

DEC's success paradoxically accelerated ARD's decline. Investment officers who had worked to build portfolio companies watched founders become wealthy while receiving minimal compensation. Charles Waite, who rescued the failing Optical Scanning Corporation and took it public, received a $2,000 raise while the company's CEO gained $10 million in net worth. Doriot complained in internal memos that SEC restrictions made adequate compensation impossible, leading to what he called an "aging process" as talented professionals lost initiative.

Amidst these pressures, key deputies departed to establish competitors. Senior ARD personnel left to start venture firms structured as limited partnerships: William Elfers left in 1965 to found Greylock; Henry Hoagland departed in 1969 to start Fidelity Ventures; William Congleton left in 1971 to establish Palmer Partners. In memos, Doriot acknowledged that ARD officers were no longer aggressively pursuing opportunities, and that the firm was losing ground in securing technology investments.

ARD continued to find promising investments even as talent departed. In 1960, it backed Teradyne, founded by Alex d'Arbeloff and Nick DeWolf to build automated test equipment for the semiconductor industry; the company turned profitable by 1962.

=== Succession and merger ===
Doriot was unwilling to delegate authority or plan succession. When Harvard's mandatory retirement policy forced him from teaching, he canceled his Manufacturing course rather than allow another professor to teach it. ARD's board established a "Committee on 70" to plan leadership transition, but Doriot evaded the process, finding fatal flaws in every proposed successor.

With no succession plan after years of deliberation, the board accepted a merger offer from Textron in 1972. DEC shares were distributed to ARD shareholders before the merger closed. Doriot remained chairman of the ARD subsidiary but retired in 1974. Dorothy Rowe and the remaining original staff departed in 1975. ARD continued operating as a Textron division but made few new investments, and the board voted to disband itself in 1976.

== Legacy ==
=== Influence in venture capital ===
ARD established investment practices that became standard in venture capital: board representation, staged financing, and long investment horizons. Its investment criteria, which focused on early-stage investment and preferred founders to their ideas, also diffused to other firms. ARD providing management expertise alongside capital.

The DEC investment demonstrated that backing technology startups could generate extraordinary returns, and the "home run" became central to venture capital strategy. As one investor later observed, "what the true venture capitalists aspire to, at least dream of, is to duplicate something like the Digital Equipment experience."

ARD's organizational failures proved influential as well. The limited partnership structure that superseded closed-end venture funds—with carried interest, management fees, and ten-year fund lives—emerged partly as solutions to problems ARD could not solve under SEC regulation. In 1972, Greylock introduced the norm of raising sequential funds rather than adding capital to existing partnerships, simplifying valuation and performance measurement.

Several ARD alumni founded influential venture firms: Bill Elfers and Charlie Waite left to found Greylock in 1965; Henry Hoagland founded Fidelity Ventures in 1969; William Congleton and John Shane formed Palmer Partners in 1972. Two of Doriot's Harvard students, Arthur Rock and Thomas Davis entered the industry early and credited Doriot's influence on their decisions to enter venture investing. Rock later financed Fairchild Semiconductor and Intel, while Davis founded the Mayfield Fund.

By the time of ARD's merger with Textron, the center of venture capital had shifted to Silicon Valley. The business model ARD introduced, independent management and active participation in early-stage technology companies, became the industry template.

=== Greater Boston economic growth ===
Although ARD operated nationally, its investments were essential to Massachusetts' economic recovery imagined by its founders. Its early investments helped establish Route 128 as a technology corridor. HVEC, Tracerlab, Ionics, Teradyne, and DEC all operated in the Boston area, and a 1967 Commerce Department study ranked Boston first among American cities for generating technology-based companies. A 1968 New York Times feature identified Boston as "at the head of the list of American cities" with high-tech industries and credited venture capital as a primary factor.

DEC proved particularly consequential: scholars have credited the DEC investment with igniting the Route 128 minicomputer boom, which resulted in the formation of the world's largest cluster of minicomputer firms. DEC eventually became the largest employer in Massachusetts and the US's second-largest computer manufacturer behind IBM. One ARD alumnus described Boston as having a "mecca syndrome" for the early computer industry: a critical mass of companies, talent, and support services that became self-sustaining.

== Sources ==
- Ante, Spencer E. (2008). Creative Capital: Georges Doriot and the Birth of Venture Capital. Boston: Harvard Business Press. ISBN 9781422101223.
- Gompers, Paul A. (1994). "The Rise and Fall of Venture Capital" (PDF). Business and Economic History. 23 (2): 1–26.
- Gompers, Paul; Lerner, Josh (2001). "The Venture Capital Revolution". Journal of Economic Perspectives. 15 (2): 145–168. doi:10.1257/jep.15.2.145.
- Gross, Daniel P.; Sampat, Bhaven N. (2023). "America, Jump-Started: World War II R&D and the Takeoff of the U.S. Innovation System". American Economic Review. 113 (12): 3323–3356. doi:10.1257/aer.20221365.
- Hsu, David H.; Kenney, Martin (2005). "Organizing Venture Capital: The Rise and Demise of American Research & Development Corporation, 1946–1973" (PDF). Industrial and Corporate Change. 14 (4): 579–616. doi:10.1093/icc/dth064.
- Jamison, David W.; Waite, Stephen (2017). "Deep Science and the Evolution of American Venture Capital". Venture Capital and the Financing of Innovation. pp. 79–110.
- Morris, Charles R. (2015). "Georges F. Doriot: 1899–1987: Dream Builder". Wall Streeters: The Creators and Corruptors of American Finance. pp. 143–156.
- Nicholas, Tom (2019). "The Market versus the Government". VC: An American History. Cambridge, MA: Harvard University Press. pp. 107–143. ISBN 9780674248267.
- Rosegrant, Susan; Lampe, David R. (1992). Route 128: Lessons from Boston's High-Tech Community. Basic Books – via Internet Archive.
