= Ballistic nylon =

Thick, tough, nylon fabric

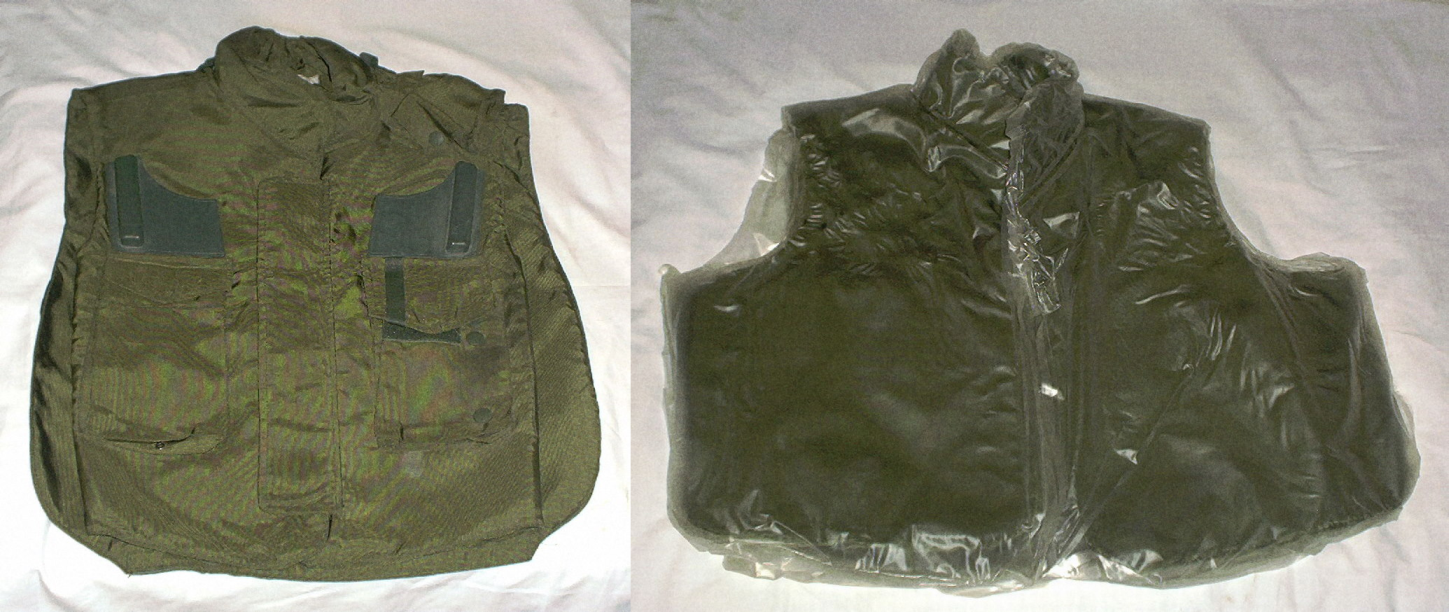
Flak jackets were originally made out of ballistic nylon in World War II to protect airmen from shrapnel

Ballistic nylon is a thick, tough, nylon fabric with several uses. Ballistic nylon was developed by the DuPont corporation as a material for flak jackets for World War II airmen. It was called ballistic because, together with other components, it was intended to protect its wearers from flying debris and fragmentation from bullet and artillery-shell impacts.

== Description ==
The original specification for ballistic nylon was an 18 oz (510 g) (ounce) nylon fabric made from 1050 denier high tenacity nylon yarn in a 2×2 basketweave. Today it may be any nylon fabric made with a "ballistic weave", typically a 2×2 or 2×3 basketweave. It can be woven from nylon yarns of various denier such as 840 denier, 1050 denier and 1680 denier.

== Origin ==
Ballistic nylon was originally developed by Dupont for flak jackets for World War II airmen. Used either with metal or fiberglass (Doron) inserts or as multiple layers of laminated nylon it was intended to protect the airmen from flying debris and fragmentation from bullet and artillery-shell impacts. It has generally been superseded by Kevlar and other fabrics.

== Modern uses ==
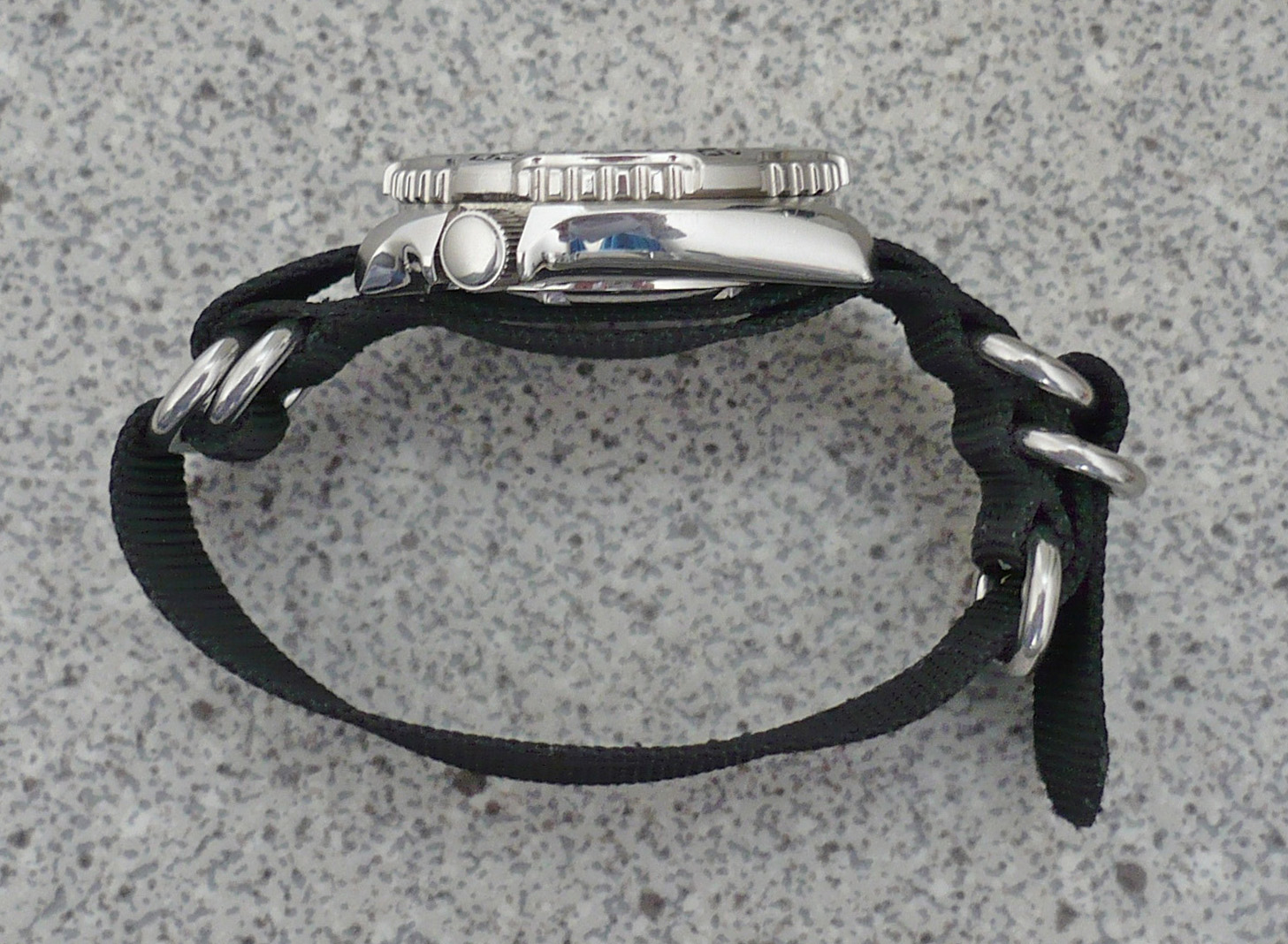
Diving watch on a four-ring NATO strap made of ballistic nylon.

Although ballistic nylon was originally created and used in flak jackets, its durability and cutting resistance have made it useful for non-combat applications. It can be found in backpacks, luggage, belts and straps, motorcycle jackets, watch bands, and knife sheaths. It can also be used for structural purposes, such as on skin-on-frame kayaks.

Ballistic nylon is used in chainsaw protective chaps covering the fronts of the chainsaw operator's legs. Such chaps are usually made with an outer layer of a tough smooth fabric like nylon or other synthetic fiber, with four plies of ballistic nylon inside. When the moving chainsaw chain contacts the chaps and tears the external layer, the inner plies shred. The strength of the ballistic nylon fiber will generally stop the moving chain quickly by causing the drive clutch to slip. As a result, the operator is relatively or completely uninjured.

As it is difficult to dye, ballistic nylon is usually black or another dark color.

== See also ==
- Cordura
- Ripstop nylon
