= Robert Z. Aliber =

American academic (1930–2025)

- Born: September 19, 1930; Keene, New Hampshire, U.S.
- Died: June 22, 2025 (aged 94); Evanston, Illinois, U.S.

Academic background
- Education: Yale University; Cambridge University; Williams College

Academic work
- Discipline: Economics
- Sub-discipline: international economics
- Institutions: University of Chicago
- Main interests: foreign direct investment

Robert Zelwin Aliber (September 19, 1930 – June 22, 2025) was an American economist and professor of International Economics and Finance at the University of Chicago. Aliber developed a theory linking a country's currency strength to whether its companies invest domestically or abroad.

== Life and career ==
Aliber received a Bachelor of Arts degree from Williams College (1952) and Bachelor of Arts (1954) and a Master of Arts (1957) from Cambridge University. He received his Ph.D. from Yale University. He was a staff economist at the Commission on Money and Credit (1959–61) and at the Committee for Economic Development (1961–64). Aliber served as a senior economic advisor at the United States Agency for International Development (1964–65). He was appointed an associate professor at the University of Chicago in 1964.

He is mentioned in Michael Lewis's book Boomerang: Travels in the New Third World as having predicted the Icelandic financial crisis several years before it happened.

Aliber died on June 22, 2025, at the age of 94.
