= Dorothy Rowe =

Dorothy Rowe may refer to:

- Dorothy Rowe (psychologist), British psychologist and author
- Dorothy Rowe (venture capitalist), American venture capitalist
