= Raoul de Vitry =

- Born: Joseph-Marie-Raoul de Vitry d'Avaucourt; June 28, 1895
- Died: October 5, 1977 (aged 82)
- Education: École Polytechnique; École des Mines de Paris
- Occupation: Business executive
- Spouse: Marie-Claire-Henriette-Nicole Le Bret
- Children: 10
- Parent(s): Marie-Hyacinthe-Fernand de Vitry d'Avaucourt; Marie-Élisabeth-Louise de Louvencourt
- Relatives: Jean Le Bret (father-in-law); Marc Julia (son-in-law)

Count Raoul de Vitry d'Avaucourt (1895-1977) was a French aristocrat and business executive. He served as the chief executive officer of Pechiney from 1958 to 1967, then France's largest aluminium producer.

== Early life ==
Raoul de Vitry was born on June 28, 1895. His father was Marie-Hyacinthe-Fernand de Vitry d'Avaucourt and his mother, Marie-Élisabeth-Louise de Louvencourt.

De Vitry graduated from the École Polytechnique in 1914. During World War I, he served in the French Army from 1914 to 1919. He graduated from the École des Mines de Paris in 1922.

== Career ==
De Vitry joined Pechiney in 1927. He joined its board of directors in 1931. By 1938, he was appointed as its general manager. During World War II, he supported the French Resistance financially. He served as the chief executive officer of Pechiney from 1958 to 1967, when it was France's largest aluminium producer. De Vitry believed in working through "a planning system", including making five-year plans for company investments. Meanwhile, he believed in promoting or demoting employees depending on their performance regardless of their initial credentials.

De Vitry was the co-founder of the American Research and Development Corporation. He served on the board of directors of the Digital Equipment Corporation.

De Vitry was a donor to INSEAD, where his name is inscribed on a plaque in the entrance.

De Vitry was the recipient of the Croix de Guerre for his World War I service. He was also a Commander of the Legion of Honour, a Grand-Officer of the National Order of Merit.

== Personal life and death ==
De Vitry married Marie-Claire-Henriette-Nicole Le Bret. They had ten children, including four sons who, like him, attended the École Polytechnique . He was the father-in-law of Marc Julia. He died on October 5, 1977.
