= Salvatore Nicosia =

Italian long-distance runner

Personal information
- Born: March 8, 1963 (age 63) Motta Sant'Anastasia, Italy

Sport
- Country: Italy
- Sport: Athletics
- Event: Marathon
- Club: G.S. Fiamme Gialle

Achievements and titles
- Personal bests: 10000 m: 28:08.85 (1984); Marathon: 2:12:13 (1987)
Medal record
Universiade
Silver medal – second place	1985 Kobe	Marathon
World Marathon Cup
Gold medal – first place	1987 Seoul	Team marathon

Salvatore Nicosia (born 8 March 1963) is an Italian former long-distance runner, that won two medals at the International athletics competitions.

== Biography ==
Salvatore Nicosia has 13 caps in national team from 1982 to 1989.

== Achievements ==
Year	Competition	Venue	Position	Event	Performance	Note
1985	Universiade	(Japan) Kobe	2nd	Marathon	2:21:09	

== National championships ==
Salvatore Nicosia has won 2 times the individual national championship.

- 1 win in 10000 metres (1985)
- 1 win in Marathon (1994)
