= Athletics at the 1985 Summer Universiade – Men's marathon =

The men's marathon event at the 1985 Summer Universiade was held at the Kobe Universiade Memorial Stadium in Kobe on 1 September 1985.

== Results ==
Rank	Athlete	Nationality	Time	Notes
1st place, gold medalist(s)	Orlando Pizzolato	Italy	2:20:06	
2nd place, silver medalist(s)	Salvatore Nicosia	Italy	2:21:09	
3rd place, bronze medalist(s)	Paul Gompers	United States	2:21:40	
4	Yuriy Straykov	Soviet Union	2:23:02	
5	Yu Jae-seong	South Korea	2:23:17	
6	Petr Saltyakov	Soviet Union	2:24:55	
7	Toshihiro Shibutani	Japan	2:27:12	
8	Sam Cho Myong	North Korea	2:30:00	
9	Peter Lyrenmann	Switzerland	2:30:49	
10	James Njeru	Kenya	2:33:02	
11	Li D.	North Korea	2:42:17	
12	Adolphe Ambowode	Central African Republic	2:45:18	
13	Ismael Mahmoud Ghassab	Jordan	2:45:27	
14	Tomohiro Imamura	Japan	2:46:08	
15	Amira Prasad Yadav	Nepal	3:03:20	
	George Mambosasa	Malawi	DNF	
	Chik Ho Sing	Hong Kong	DNF	
	Kiyoji Hayashi	Japan	DNF	
	Mark Stickley	United States	DNF	
	Richard Cawkwell	Canada	DNF	
	Georgios Afordakos	Greece	DNF	
	Patrick Ashkettle	New Zealand	DNF	
	M. Alombi	Zaire	DNF	
