= Flak jacket =

Jacket or vest that protects against shell fragments

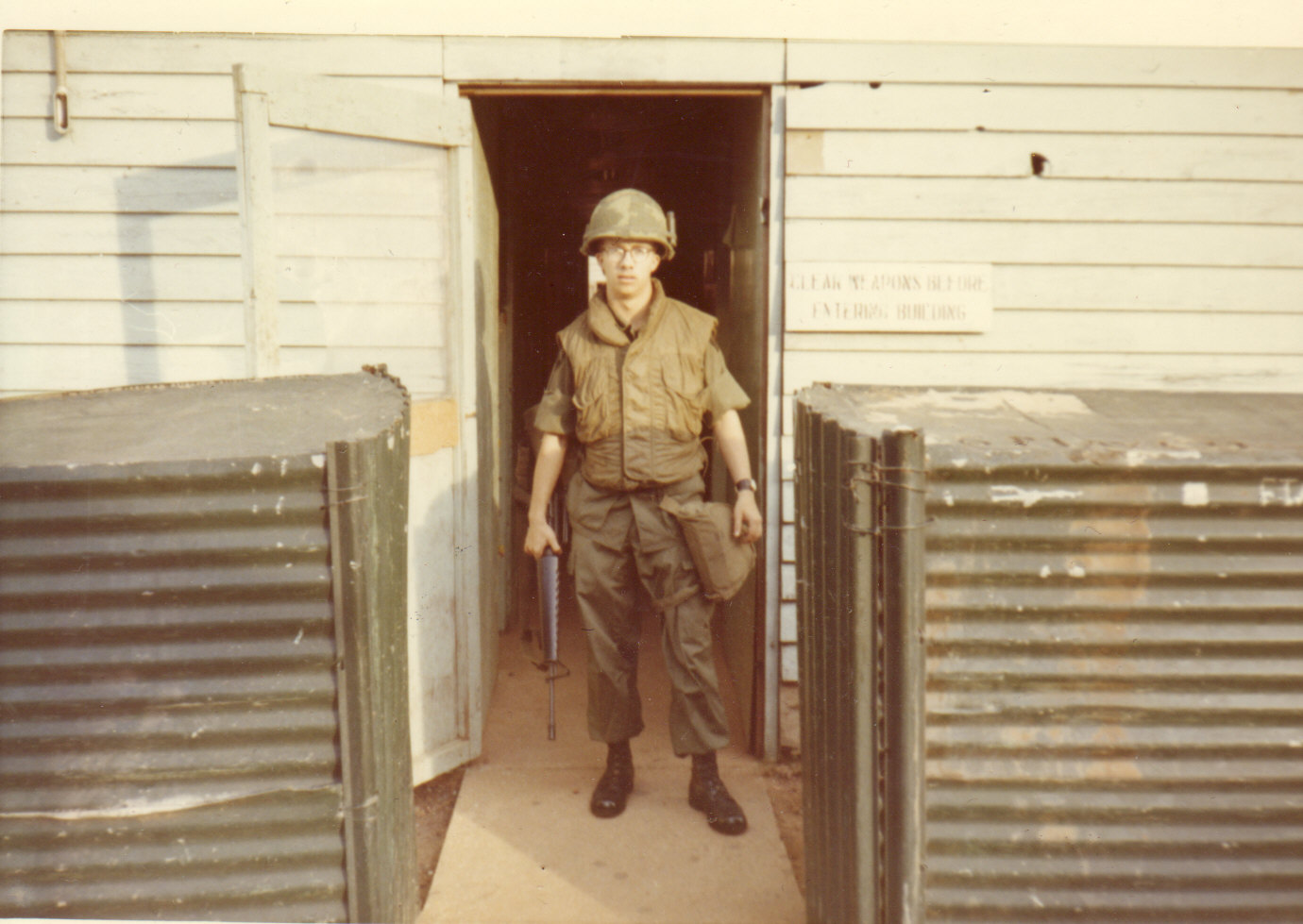
U.S. Army soldier wearing a flak jacket in 1971, during the Vietnam War

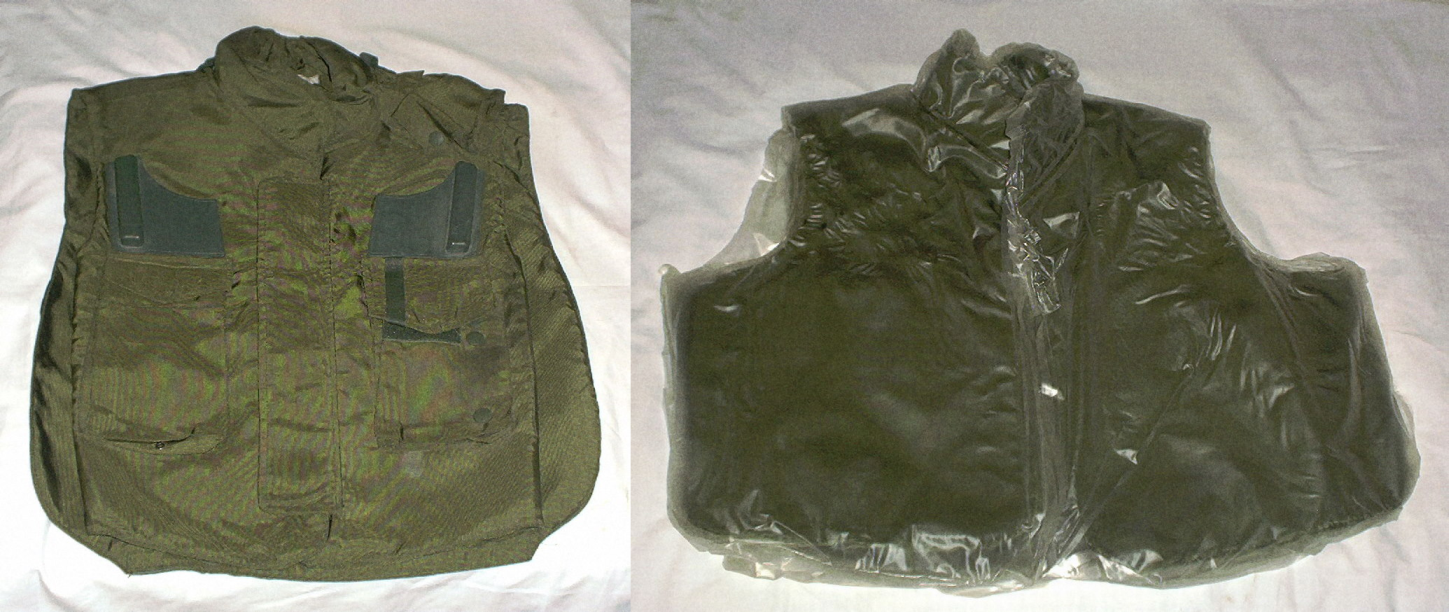
The two components of an obsolete British military flak vest. On the left, the nylon vest. On the right, the 12 layers of ballistic nylon that provide the actual protection

A flak jacket or flak vest is a form of body armor. A flak jacket is designed to provide protection from case fragments ("frag") from high explosive weaponry, such as anti-aircraft artillery ("flak" is a German contraction for Fliegerabwehrkanone, "aircraft-defense gun"), grenade fragments, very small pellets used in shotguns such as the "Birdshot", and other lower-velocity projectiles. It is not designed to protect against bullets fired from most small arms such as rifles or handguns. However flak jackets are able to sustain certain gunshots, depending on the angle at which the shot was fired (an oblique angle for example), the caliber of the bullet, the speed of the projectile and the range from which the shot was fired.

The term "flak jacket" is often colloquially applied to newer body armor featuring protection against small arms projectiles, but the original usage predated the existence of modern and more resistant bulletproof vests and the two are not interchangeable in performance.

== History ==
Anecdotes describing garments designed to protect the wearer from penetrating weapons can be found far back into recorded history.

Two types of protective garment from the American Civil War in the 1860s had a basic design similar to the flak jacket or ballistic armor of modern times in that solid plates were used as the main ballistic protection. The "Soldiers' Bullet Proof Vest" was manufactured by the G. & D. Cook & Company of New Haven, Connecticut. It consisted of two pieces of steel inserted into the pockets of a regular black military vest. Versions for infantry weighed 3.5 lb (1.6 kg) while a version for cavalry and artillery weighed 7 lb (3.2 kg). They sold for $5–7. A more medieval-looking type of armor was made by the Atwater Armor Company, also of New Haven. It consisted of four large plates of steel held on the body by broad metal hooks over the shoulders and a belt around the waist. The Atwater vest was heavier than the Cook models and cost about twice as much.

During World War I, a number of British and American officers recognized that many casualties could be avoided if effective armor were available. Isolated efforts at developing armor were made, and soldiers could make individual purchases or efforts, but there was no armor issued to the troops. As it is today, issues of weight, cost, availability of materials and/or environmental stability complicated the issue of developing armor that would also be effective. For example, soft armor made of silk was tried on a small scale based on Japanese designs, but this material did not last well under harsh environmental conditions.

The first usage of the term "flak jacket" refers to the armor originally developed by the Wilkinson Sword company during World War II to help protect Royal Air Force (RAF) aircrew from the flying debris and shell fragments thrown by German anti-aircraft guns' high-explosive shells (flak itself is an abbreviation for the German word "Fliegerabwehrkanone" (aircraft-defense gun)). The idea for the flak jacket came from Col. Malcolm C. Grow, Surgeon of the U.S. Eighth Air Force in Great Britain. He thought that many wounds he was treating could have been prevented by some kind of light armor. In 1943, he was awarded the Legion of Merit.

The Royal Air Force subsequently offered the jackets to the United States Army Air Forces, which adopted them as a Defense Standard. The UK subsequently supplied the USAAF with 9,600 flak jackets under lend-lease.

During World War II, flak jackets and steel helmets were worn by U.S. Navy personnel on aircraft carriers during battle, since these ships and especially their flight decks offered little protection for their crew. The jackets were supposed to protect against shell fragments and heat.

== Ballistic protection ==
Col. Grow’s request to the Wilkinson Sword company was to develop a vest that could stop a .45 caliber (11.43 mm) round fired at close range. Although flak jackets offered protection against some small caliber pistol bullets and shell fragments, ultimately they proved to be less effective than hoped. Flak jackets are now considered to be inferior to modern ballistic vests.

It was claimed that the Marine's M-1951 flak jacket could stop a 90 gr (5.8 g) 7.62×25mm Tokarev pistol round at the muzzle of the gun. However, even the Vietnam era revised Flak jackets were not capable to stop high power or high velocity pistol rounds, much less an AK-47 rifle bullet (7.62×39mm). Nevertheless the Army's and Marine's Flak vests did a good job of stopping mortar shell fragments, debris, grenade fragments, ricochets, and direct hits from mild-power/low velocity pistol rounds.

Although they were not tested to be compliant with the NIJ standards, the Army's M1952a and M69 ballistic nylon Flak Jackets performed very similar as NIJ level 1 body armor (a vest required 10 layers of Ballistic Nylon to meet the level 1 NIJ standard as seen in the Smith & Wesson's Barrier Vest), while the Marine's Doron plates inside their Flak vests were capable at stopping .45 ACP FMJ bullets at the muzzle of the gun.

== Non-ballistic protection ==
The multiple layers of Ballistic Nylon in these jackets were only slash resistant, while the Doron plates were capable of protecting against bayonet thrusts and stabs.

It was not until 1970, that the U.S. National Institute of Justice, which now publishes test and performance standards for body armor, began a deliberate program to develop body armor for law enforcement personnel that would be effective against specific threats that were common causes of officer injury and death. At the time that included .38 Special and .22 Long Rifle bullets, in particular, and also bullets from 9mm, .45, and .32 caliber firearms.

== Materials ==
The first flak jackets consisted of manganese steel plates sewn into a waistcoat made of cotton canvas, with later revisions of the vest, the waistcoat was made of ballistic nylon (a material engineered by the DuPont company); therefore, flak jackets functioned as an evolved form of plate armor or brigandine. The first flak jacket weighed 22 lb (10.0 kg).

During the Korean and Vietnam wars, the flak jacket was changed and the manganese steel plates were replaced by other materials. The U.S. Army's vests (Body Armor, Fragmentation Protective, Vest M1952a & M69) weighed under eight pounds and were made of 12 layers of 1050 denier basket weave ballistic nylon sealed in a vinyl plastic bag to repel water and later revisions added polyethylene stiffeners between the 5th and 6th layer to alleviate bunching of the ballistic nylon. The 3/4 collar had 6 layers of 1050 denier ballistic nylon. The exterior of the vest was made of standard nylon fabric in a basket weave pattern with an Oxford style finish.

The vests used by the U.S. Marines (Vest, Armored M-1955) weighed more than ten pounds, the exterior of the vest was made of a heavy duty Cotton Poplin, with the third revision of the vest the material was changed to nylon fabric, and the interior were a combination of ballistic nylon layers (for the upper front and back of the torso) and fiberglass plates known as Doron (for the chest and upper abdominal area, torso sides and back). Doron was made of fiberglass layers placed in an ethyl cellulose resin under high pressure. It was named after then-Colonel Georges F. Doriot, director of the Military Planning Division, Office of the Quartermaster General.

The generation of armor developed in the 1970s through the National Institute of Justice incorporated layers of soft armor in the form of DuPont’s Kevlar fabric, which has since become synonymous with ballistic protection and a general term used for several similar (aramid-based) materials.

== See also ==
- Buff coat, an early modern era protective jacket; if several layers of leather were used, it was capable of protecting from spent bullets and other low-velocity projectiles fired from a distance
- Hauberk, an earlier form of body armor, was used to defend against swords, knives, etc.
- Chain mail, an ancient form of personal armour consisting of linked metal rings which has also been used to protect against shrapnel and low-velocity ammunition, like the Spanish mail used by Comanche chief Iron Jacket to protect his body from revolver rounds.
