= William A. Sahlman =

American academic

- Education: Princeton University; Harvard Business School
- Occupation: Academic
- Employer: Harvard Business School

William A. Sahlman is an American academic. He is a professor emeritus at the Harvard Business School. He has published research about entrepreneurship, including over 150 business cases. He is the co-author or co-editor of three books.

== Early life ==
William A. Sahlman graduated from Princeton University in 1972. He earned a master in business administrator in 1975 and a PhD in Business Economics in 1982 from the Harvard Business School.

== Academia and commentaries ==
Sahlman began teaching at the Harvard Business School in 1980. He has published research about entrepreneurship, including more than 150 business cases. He is the co-author of a book and the co-editor of two more books.

Sahlman argued that the 2008 financial crisis was a crisis of corporate management resulting from a disorder of "incentives, risk management and control, accounting, human capital, and culture."

Sahlman suggested that successful business plans need to focus on "the people, the opportunity, the context, and the possibilities for both risk and reward."

With his colleague Josh Lerner, Sahlman argued that several steps could be taken to make entrepreneurship as competitive in the United States as it is in China or Brazil. For example, they suggested that the USG should invest more in business ventures, and use the toolbox of taxes and subsidies to encourage innovation. They also suggested that the government should let entrepreneurs address social ills, as in the case of charter schools. They added educated immigrants should be given green cards to improve the rate of human capital in the United States. Moreover, they suggested that capital markets should be liberated from unnecessary regulations. They also suggested that the government should publish financial data and encourage dialogue between trade organizations, and discourage unfair competition by banning monopolies. Additionally, they noted that the government should do away with Obamacare and encourage entrepreneurship in healthcare; lower taxes; find the right balance in protecting intellectual rights to enable innovation; maintain flexible dismissals; and reduce political gridlock.

== Selected publications ==
=== Books ===
- Roberts, Michael J., Howard H. Stevenson, William A. Sahlman, Paul Marshall and Richard G. Hamermesh, eds. New Business Ventures and the Entrepreneur. 6th ed. New York: McGraw-Hill/Irwin, 2006
- Paul A. Gompers; William Sahlman (2002) [2001]. Entrepreneurial Finance: A Casebook. Wiley. ISBN 978-0-471-08066-4. OCLC 634854524.
- Sahlman, William A., Howard H. Stevenson, Michael J Roberts, and Amar V. Bhide. The Entrepreneurial Venture. 2nd ed. Harvard Business School Press, 1999
