= Tracerlab =

Tracerlab, Inc.
- Company type: Public company
- Industry: Nuclear technology; Radiochemistry; Instrumentation
- Founded: March 1, 1946
- Founders: William E. Barbour Jr.; Wendell Peacock; Ray Ghelardi; John R. Niles; Homer S. Myers; W. Raymond Gustafson
- Fate: Merged into Laboratory for Electronics (1961)
- Headquarters: 55 Oliver Street, Boston, Massachusetts
- Products: Radioactive isotope services, Geiger counters, radiation detection instruments, X-ray equipment

Tracerlab, Inc. was an American company founded in Boston in 1946 that supplied commercial applications of radioactive isotopes for medical, scientific, and industrial uses. One of the first companies to exploit the peacetime applications of atomic energy, Tracerlab grew from a small startup to a business with over 1,000 employees and annual revenues exceeding $12 million by the early 1950s.

The company was an early investment of American Research & Development Corporation (ARD), the first modern venture capital firm.

== History ==
=== Founding ===
Tracerlab originated from a group of alumni from MIT's Radiation Laboratory, the wartime radar research facility. In early 1946, John R. Niles, Homer S. Myers, W. Raymond Gustafson, and Ray Ghelardi—all veterans of radar development—pooled resources to form the Industrial Electronics Laboratory in Cambridge, Massachusetts, initially offering services from radio repairs to shipboard radar installations.

The company's direction changed in February 1946 when the founders met with Wendell Peacock, a young MIT physics professor who had conducted significant wartime work with radioactive tracers. Peacock recognized the potential for commercial applications once the Army's Manhattan District released radioisotopes from the atomic piles for civilian use. He proposed creating a company to supply electronic instruments and radiochemical services to universities, hospitals, and industrial laboratories.

William E. Barbour Jr., a thirty-five-year-old electrical engineer from MIT with business experience at Raytheon and Boston Edison, joined the group and provided $26,000 in initial capital. Tracerlab was incorporated on March 1, 1946.

=== Early growth and venture investment ===
On August 2, 1946, Tracerlab received its first isotopes, released by the Army from Oak Ridge. The company moved into dilapidated buildings near Boston's business center at 55 Oliver Street, transforming and equipping the space for less than $12,000.

The company's key early product was the "Autoscaler," an automatic radiation counter designed to simplify the use of Geiger-Mueller tubes. The instrument allowed preset counting of atomic disintegrations with statistical accuracy within 1 percent, making radiation measurement accessible to technicians without specialized physics training.

By late 1946, the original capital was nearly exhausted despite growing sales. Barbour was rejected by local Boston investors and turned down Wall Street money that required a majority stake. After unsuccessful negotiations with several investors, Barbour secured $150,000 from American Research and Development Corporation on December 31, 1946 in exchange for a 13 percent stake. ARD received 1,500 shares of convertible preferred stock while leaving the founders in control. This investment would become one of ARD's early successes.

=== Expansion ===
By early 1952, Tracerlab had grown to employ over 1,000 people and reported annual sales of $4.5 million. The company sold approximately 400 radioactive compounds tagged with isotopes, along with complementary measuring devices, Geiger tubes, and radiation protection equipment.

In 1952, Tracerlab acquired Keleket X-Ray Corporation of Covington, Kentucky, an established manufacturer of X-ray apparatus and pocket-sized radiation measuring instruments. Combined sales exceeded $12 million by 1953, though the company faced profitability challenges from engineering difficulties on government contracts and the costs of developing new product lines.

The company established a Western division laboratory in Richmond, California, with approximately sixty employees engaged in research for the Air Force, the Atomic Energy Commission, and industrial organizations.

=== Later years and merger ===
In April 1956, Barbour was named chairman of the board and W.O. Faxon became president. By this time, Tracerlab faced increasing competition from approximately eighty other companies in the radioisotope industry, compared to just a handful at the company's founding.

In 1961, Tracerlab merged into Laboratory for Electronics, Inc., a producer of airborne navigation and radar systems. Under the merger terms, every four and one-half shares of Tracerlab common stock were converted into one share of Laboratory for Electronics stock.

== Products and services ==
Tracerlab's business covered three main areas:

The company accepted isotope shipments from Oak Ridge, processed them to customer specifications, and reshipped them. This service was essential because radioisotopes often arrived in highly concentrated forms requiring dilution and specialized handling in "hot" laboratories equipped with lead shielding and remote-control tools.

Tracerlab provided film badge dosimetry services for laboratory workers exposed to radiation, competing with a similar service offered by Oak Ridge.

The company manufactured the Autoscaler and related counting instruments, Geiger-Mueller tubes, sample holders, and the Tracergraph for automated time-elapsed recording. Tracerlab also developed Beta Gauges for measuring the thickness of sheet materials during manufacturing processes.

== Significance ==
Tracerlab was among the first round of investments of American Research and Development Corporation, alongside High Voltage Engineering Corporation. Both were MIT spin-offs, and together they demonstrated ARD's strategy of backing new, science-based companies. Karl Compton and ARD chairman Merrill Griswold served on Tracerlab's board, establishing a template of active investor oversight that became characteristic of venture capital practice.

== Sources ==
- Nicholas, Tom (2019). "The Market versus the Government". VC: An American History. Cambridge, MA: Harvard University Press. pp. 107–143. ISBN 9780674248267.
