= Ismael Mahmoud Ghassab =

Jordanian long-distance runner

Personal information
- Native name: اسماعيل محمود•قصاب
- Nationality: Jordanian
- Born: 1 January 1961 (age 65)

Sport
- Sport: Long-distance running
- Event: Marathon

Ismael Mahmoud Ghassab (born 1 January 1961) is a Jordanian long-distance runner. He competed in the marathon at the 1984 Summer Olympics in Los Angeles.

Mahmoud finished 64th in the 1984 Olympic marathon. He improved his finish to 13th at the 1985 World University Games marathon.
