= Henry W. Hoagland =

Henry W. Hoagland (1912–1995) was born in Colorado Springs, Colorado, and attended Stanford University and Harvard Business School. During World War II he served with the Military Planning Division of the Quartermaster Corps. In 1946 he obtained a job with the Field Service Staff of the Republican National Committee, in which he campaigned for Republican congressmen in marginal districts. During 1947 and 1948 he was Deputy Director of the Joint Committee on Atomic Energy. In August 1948 he resigned from the Committee to campaign for Republican congressional candidates. After the 1948 election Hoagland obtained a job with the American Research and Development Corporation of Boston, Massachusetts, where he worked for over twenty years. However, he continued to be active in Republican politics, and took frequent leaves of absence from his job to help with Republican campaign work.

Down to 1954 Hoagland continued to assist Republican candidates in marginal districts, particularly in Indiana, Ohio and Colorado. In 1954 he began to work as an advance man for President Dwight D. Eisenhower’s campaign trips. In this capacity he went to cities that the President was planning to visit and make all the local arrangements. He helped arrange for coverage of the visit by local news media. He helped plan the route of the President's motorcade and convinced local businesses to allow their employees to leave work at the time of the motorcade so large crowds could be assembled as the President passed. Hoagland also met with local Republican leaders to determine who would travel with the President or sit with him at local events, a matter of great importance to politicians who hoped to gain recognition by being seen with the President. Hoagland kept extensive notebooks regarding his work as an advance man, and also collected schedules and local newspaper articles about the President's trips. The last trip he planned for Eisenhower was a proposed visit to Liberal, Kansas, in October 1964, after Eisenhower had left the White House. The trip was cancelled at the last minute due to the death of former president Herbert Hoover.
