= Commission on Money and Credit =

Commission on Money and Credit (CMC)
Commission overview
- Formed: November 21, 1957; 68 years ago
- Dissolved: 1961; 65 years ago
- Employees: 9-18
- Commission executive: Donald K. David
- Key document: Report on U.S. financial system

A national Commission on Money and Credit (CMC) was established November 21, 1957, by Donald K. David, Chairman of the Committee for Economic Development (CED) to make the first extensive investigation of the U.S. monetary system since the Aldrich Commission of 1908–1911. The report of the commission was published in June 1961 and it was subsequently disbanded.

== Goals and structure ==
The commission was planned to make the first extensive investigation of the U.S. monetary system since the Aldrich Commission of 1908–1911. The Commission on Money and Credit would evaluate whether the existing structure of the U.S. financial system and the regulations on various financial institutions were adequate to cope with the anticipated future needs of the U.S. economy.

The Commission on Money and Credit was intended to consist of nine to eighteen members drawn from “business, labor, agriculture, and education, and from fields of research and administration”. Ten prominent individuals in academia, social science research, and economics, would advise Mr. David on the selection of the members of the commission.

== Hyman Philip Minsky ==
Hyman P. Minsky, Associate Professor of Economics, The University of California, Berkeley, consulted with the commission, for which he co-authored Private Capital Markets; A Series Of Research Studies Prepared For The Commission On Money And Credit in 1964.

== President John F. Kennedy's Remarks ==
President John F. Kennedy made the following remarks upon receiving the report of The Commission on Money and Credit, in a speech on June 19, 1961, from the Oval Office of the White House, Washington, D.C.:

I am pleased to receive this report from the Commission on Money and Credit. I have been well aware of the wide-ranging work that the Commission has had under way during the past three years. As you know, three members of my administration have come from among your distinguished membership.

I congratulate the Commission on the effort it has spent in devising ways and means to improve our private and public system of money and credit, and thus to strengthen the Nation's economic health. I should also like to express my appreciation to the Committee for Economic Development for originating this project, and to the Ford Foundation and the Merrill Foundation for financing it. The Commission on Money and Credit has presented a program of monetary and fiscal reforms that could make an important contribution to the health and strength of our economy. The Commission, drawn mainly on business and banking, but also of labor and the professions, has submerged the special interests of its members in a laudable effort in the public interest. Their report, which points the way to improve coordination of financial and economic policy, deserves the attention of every American. I commend particularly those who have the responsibility for the maintenance of conditions of high employment and rapid growth in the American economy. It dramatizes how private citizens, regardless of their committed points of view, can, and sometimes do, dedicate themselves to work in the public interest. It demonstrates also the constructive role that private philanthropic institutions play in providing financial support for such activities. This private, voluntary study cannot fail to stimulate and inform the national discussion of those grave economic problems that this Nation faces from day to day. As a consensus of people in many walks of life, this report should bring others to study and discuss the problems of national coordination of the governmental and private institutions, which together guide our complex money and credit system.

I hope that people everywhere in the Nation, as well as those who represent them in Congress, will read this report for the information, analysis, and recommendations it contains, whether or not they agree with its numerous and provocative proposals.
