= Donald K. David =

Donald Kirk David
- Born: February 15, 1896; Moscow, Idaho
- Died: April 13, 1979 (aged 83); Hyannis, Massachusetts
- Spouse: Elizabeth Soulen

Donald Kirk David (February 15, 1896 - April 13, 1979) was the third dean of the Harvard Business School, serving from 1942 to 1955.

Donald K. David, the Chairman of the Committee for Economic Development (CED), established a national Commission on Money and Credit (CMC), November 21, 1957. The report of the Commission was published in June 1961 and it was subsequently disbanded.

He graduated from University of Idaho and Harvard Business School.

== Archives and records ==
- Donald K. David papers at Baker Library Special Collections, Harvard Business School
