= Adam B. Jaffe =

American economist

Adam B. Jaffe (born May 1955) is a freelance economist working in Boston, Massachusetts. He was previously Director of Motu Economic and Public Policy Research, in Wellington, New Zealand and a professor of economics at Brandeis University. His areas of expertise include industrial organization, technological change and innovation, law and economics, and environmental economics. The overarching theme of his work is focused on the process of technological change and innovation.

== Education ==
Jaffe attended the Massachusetts Institute of Technology from 1973 until 1976, where he received a bachelor's degree in chemistry. In 1978 he received a master's degree in technology and policy. Jaffe attended Harvard University from 1980 to 1985, where he received a Ph.D. in economics.

== Work ==
In 1985 Jaffe joined the National Bureau of Economic Research (NBER) as a fellow. There, he became the co-founder and Co-organizer of the Science and Technology Policy Research Workshop (1995–1998) and the Innovation Policy and the Economy Group (1999–2007). In 1988 Jaffe co-founded the Economics Resource Group which functioned as a consulting firm for antitrust, regulatory, and intellectual property cases. The firm was sold to Lexecon in 1999. From 1990 to 1991 Jaffe worked as a senior staff economist on the President's Council of Economic Advisers where he was responsible for antitrust, environmental, and innovation policy. From 1994, Jaffe was on the faculty at Brandeis University in Massachusetts where he also served as the chair of the economics department from 2000 to 2002 and the Dean of Arts and Sciences from 2003 to 2011. He became Director of Motu Economic and Public Policy Research in May 2013 and was named an adjunct professor of Queensland University of Technology in early 2015. In 2018 he was appointed chair of the board on Science, Technology and Economic Policy (STEP) of the National Academies of Science.

According to Google Scholar, Jaffe's scholarly work has received approximately 39,000 citations from subsequent publications. He is the top ranked economist in Oceania according to RePEc.

== Awards and recognition ==
Jaffe joined the Phi Beta Kappa society at MIT in 1976. He was a recipient of the Alfred P. Sloan Research Fellowship at MIT from 1976 to 1977, and the Alfred P. Sloan Dissertation Fellowship at Harvard from 1984 to 1985. In 2007 Jaffe received an honorable mention from the Venice Award for Intellectual Property for his work titled Innovation and its Discontents.

== Bibliography ==
- Jaffe, Adam B.; Trajtenberg, Manuel; Henderson, Rebecca (1993). "Geographic Localization of Knowledge Spillovers as Evidenced by Patent Citations" (PDF). The Quarterly Journal of Economics. 108 (3): 577–598. doi:10.2307/2118401. JSTOR 2118401.
- Adam B. Jaffe; Josh Lerner (27 May 2011). Innovation and Its Discontents: How Our Broken Patent System is Endangering Innovation and Progress, and What to Do About It. Princeton University Press. ISBN 9780691117256.
