= Tom Nicholas =

British economist

Tom Nicholas is a British economist who is currently the William J. Abernathy Professor of Business Administration at the Harvard Business School.
