= Paul A. Gompers =

American economist

Paul Alan Gompers
- Education: Harvard University; University of Oxford
- Occupation: Economist
- Employer: Harvard Business School

Medal record

Men's athletics

Representing United States

World University Games
Bronze medal – third place	1985 Kobe	Marathon

Paul A. Gompers is an American economist and former long-distance runner. He is the Eugene Holman Professor of Business Administration at the Harvard Business School. He is the co-author of three books.

== Early life ==
Paul A. Gompers grew up in Belleville, Illinois. He graduated with a bachelor's degree in biology from Harvard University in 1987. He earned a Marshall Scholarship to attend the University of Oxford, where he earned an MSc in economics. He earned a PhD in business economics from Harvard University in 1993.

== Running career ==
Gompers was an accomplished long-distance runner. Running for the Harvard Crimson, Gompers placed 5th at the 1986 NCAA Division I Cross Country Championships. He represented the U.S. at the 1983 World Cross Country Championships and was a national champion over the 20K run in 1987.

In December 1983, Gompers ran 2 hours, 15 minutes, and 28 seconds in his first ever marathon while still a freshman at Harvard. The time was a world under-20 record, and it still stands as the fastest marathon ever by an American teenager. At the 1985 World University Games, Gompers won his first international medal by placing 3rd in the men's marathon.

Gompers trained by running 150 to 170 miles per week, including 35 miles at once sometimes.

== Career ==
Gompers worked as a biochemist for Bayer shortly after college. After his PhD, he was an assistant professor of finance at the University of Chicago's Booth School of Business. He joined the Harvard Business School, where he eventually became the Eugene Holman Professor of Business Administration. He now teaches executive education at the HBS. He has written between 50 and 60 business cases. He has also published articles in The Journal of Finance, the Journal of Financial Economics, the Brookings Papers on Economic Activity, The Journal of Private Equity, the Quarterly Journal of Economics, The Journal of Law and Economics, etc. Additionally, he is the co-author of three books, two of which were co-authored with his HBS colleague Josh Lerner and the third one with his HBS colleague William A. Sahlman.

Gompers serves on the board of directors of Spur Capital Partners, a private equity firm. He is also a senior advisor to Cornerstone Research, a litigation consulting firm. He is also a research associate at the National Bureau of Economic Research.

== Works ==
- Gompers, Paul A.; Lerner, Josh (1999). The Venture Capital Cycle. Cambridge, Massachusetts: MIT Press.
- Gompers, Paul A.; Lerner, Josh (2001). The Money of Invention: How Venture Capital Creates New Wealth. Boston, Massachusetts: Harvard Business School Press. ISBN 9781578513260. OCLC 783011253.
- Gompers, Paul A.; Sahlman, William A. (2001). Entrepreneurial Finance: A Casebook. New York: John Wiley & Sons. ISBN 978047108066-4.
