= Josh Lerner =

American economist

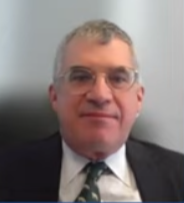
- Speaking at the World Economic Forum's Sustainable Development Impact Summit 2021
- Education: Yale University; Harvard University
- Occupation: Economist
- Employer: Harvard Business School

Josh Lerner is an American economist known for his research in venture capital, private equity, and innovation and entrepreneurship. He is the Jacob H. Schiff Professor of Investment Banking at the Harvard Business School. According to Web of Science on June 16, 2023, he has 165 indexed publications and a Hirsch index of 66, and over 74,000 citations on Google Scholar, which puts him in top 5% of economics researchers in the USA. His research encompasses investments, startups, venture capital and private equity.

== Early life ==
Josh Lerner graduated from Yale University, and he earned a PhD in economics from Harvard University.

== Career ==
Lerner worked for the Brookings Institution. He was also a research fellow in the International Security program at the Belfer Center for Science and International Affairs in 1990–1991. He later joined the faculty at the Harvard Business School, where he was eventually promoted as the Jacob H. Schiff Professor of Investment Banking. He is a member of the European Corporate Governance Institute.

Lerner is the author of several books. He won the Axiom Business Book Award and the PROSE Award for Excellence in Business for Boulevard of Broken Dreams in 2009.

Between 2008 and 2010 Lerner was a member of the advisory board of The Abraaj Group and a paid consultant to the firm until 2017. As well as authoring HBS case studies on the firm and leading the Abraaj Academy, Lerner wrote a report used by Abraaj as a validation of its own questionable portfolio valuation methodologies, later described by Lerner as an inadvertent mistake. Abraaj filed for provisional liquidation in 2018 with the founder Arif Naqvi the subject of a criminal investigation in the United States for the misappropriation of $250 million in investor funding.

Lerner received the Global Award for Entrepreneurship Research in 2010.

== Selected publications ==
=== Books ===
Lerner is an author and co-author of several books including:

- Gompers, Paul A.; Lerner, Josh (1999). The Venture Capital Cycle. Cambridge, Massachusetts: MIT Press.
- Gompers, Paul A.; Lerner, Josh (2001). The Money of Invention: How Venture Capital Creates New Wealth. Boston, Massachusetts: Harvard Business School Press. ISBN 9781578513260. OCLC 783011253.
- Jaffe, Adam; Lerner, Josh (2004). Innovation and Its Discontents: How Our Broken Patent System Is Endangering Innovation and Progress, and What To Do About It. Princeton, New Jersey: Princeton University Press. ISBN 9780691117256. OCLC 965960379.
- Lerner, Josh (2009). Boulevard of Broken Dreams: Why Public Efforts to Boost Entrepreneurship and Venture Capital Have Failed and What to Do About It. Princeton, New Jersey: Princeton University Press. ISBN 9780691142197. OCLC 781617702.
- Lerner, Josh; Schankerman, Mark (2010). The Comingled Code: Open Source and Economic Development. Cambridge, Massachusetts: MIT Press. ISBN 9780262289573. OCLC 942554236.
- Lerner, Josh; Schoar, Antoinette, eds. (2010). International Differences in Entrepreneurship. Chicago, Illinois: University of Chicago Press. ISBN 9780226473093. OCLC 702350246.
- Lerner, Josh; Stern, Scott, eds. (2012). The Rate and Direction of Inventive Activity Revisited. Chicago, Illinois: University of Chicago Press. ISBN 9780226473031. OCLC 809972828.
- Lerner, Josh (2012). The Architecture of Innovation: The Economics of Creative Organizations. Cambridge, Massachusetts: Harvard Business Review Press. ISBN 9781422143636. OCLC 835170544.
- Hardymon, Felda; Leamon, Ann; Lerner, Josh (2012). Venture Capital, Private Equity, and the Financing of Entrepreneurship. New York: John Wiley & Sons. ISBN 9780470591437. OCLC 785798970.
