= Doron plate =

Material used for body armor

Doron plate is a strong fiberglass-based laminate, also known as a Glass reinforced plastic (GRP), that may have been first used by the United States Marines Corps as personal body armor for infantry in the mop-up operations in late June of 1945 After Battle Of Okinawa, in spite of some believing it was used in the battle itself. The plates were approximately 3.2 mm (1/8 in) thick and cut into 130 mm (5 in) squares, then inserted into pockets on a nylon vest that covered the front and back portions of the torso as well as the shoulders. The vest weighed approximately 3.6 kg (8 lb). The plates consist of fiberglass filaments bonded together with resin under pressure. The plates could be molded to fit the contours of the chest or back.

In May 1943, the Dow Company discovered the technology for the doron plate, because a shortage of metal during World War II had stimulated research into non-metallic forms of body armor. The doron plate could not stop direct fire from rifle and machine gun bullets, but was effective at stopping debris, shrapnel, and up to .45 ACP FMJ pistol bullets.

The plates were named after General Georges F. Doriot who was chief of the Research and Development Branch, Office of the Quartermaster General of the Army during World War II. The doron plates were used in the Korean War in the M-1951 and T-52-2 vests, and in the Vietnam War in the M-1955 vests. Stronger and lighter materials such as Kevlar-based body armor eventually superseded the doron plate.

== Production Method ==
Doron, as a compressed GRP, requires high heat and heavy pressure to produce, the "woven roving" method is not as dense.
