= National Register of Historic Places listings in Mifflin County, Pennsylvania =

Location of Mifflin County in Pennsylvania

This is a list of the National Register of Historic Places listings in Mifflin County, Pennsylvania.

This is intended to be a complete list of the properties on the National Register of Historic Places in Mifflin County, Pennsylvania, United States. The locations of National Register properties and districts for which the latitude and longitude coordinates are included below, may be seen in a map.

There are 10 properties listed on the National Register in the county.

This National Park Service list is complete through NPS recent listings posted January 23, 2026.

== Current listings ==
	Name on the Register	Image	Date listed	Location	City or town	Description
1	Embassy Theatre	Embassy Theatre	July 23, 1998 (#98000899)	6 South Main Street; 40°35′49″N 77°34′34″W	Lewistown	Vaudeville and movie theater built in 1927.
2	Juniata Terrace Historic District		May 17, 2024 (#100010291)	Bound by Delaware Ave, the store on Rt. 103, the school & playgrounds continuing west along Hudson Avenue and Community Avenue, south along 4th St, east to the garages on Delaware Avenue. 40°35′07″N 77°34′49″W	Juniata Terrace	
3	Lewistown Armory	Lewistown Armory	May 9, 1991 (#91000513)	1101 Walnut Street; 40°37′08″N 77°33′06″W	Derry Township	Armory built in 1938 in the Colonial Revival style.
4	McCoy House	McCoy House	March 14, 1973 (#73001641)	17 North Main Street; 40°35′53″N 77°34′31″W	Lewistown	House built between 1836 and 1843; birthplace of Frank Ross McCoy
5	Mifflin County Courthouse	Mifflin County Courthouse	May 28, 1976 (#76001649)	1 West Market Street; 40°35′51″N 77°34′32″W	Lewistown	Courthouse built in 1842-1843, and expanded in 1878.
6	Montgomery Ward Building	Montgomery Ward Building	September 7, 1984 (#84003497)	3–7 West Market Street; 40°35′54″N 77°34′25″W	Lewistown	Art Deco department store and office building built in 1929.
7	Old Hoopes School	Old Hoopes School	December 20, 1978 (#78002431)	Northeast of Lewistown; 40°38′24″N 77°30′25″W	Derry Township	One-room school built in 1873.
8	Old Stone Arch Bridge	Old Stone Arch Bridge	April 18, 1979 (#09000096)	Over Jack's Creek, southeast of Lewistown; 40°35′04″N 77°33′23″W	Derry Township	
9	Pennsylvania Main Line Canal, Juniata Division, Canal Section	Pennsylvania Main Line Canal, Juniata Division, Canal Section	February 20, 2002 (#02000069)	1.5 miles (2.4 km) section of canal between the Main Line of the Pennsylvania Railroad and the Juniata River; 40°33′52″N 77°35′29″W	Granville Township	Historic canal segment.
10	Wollner Building	Wollner Building	August 23, 1984 (#84003499)	16 West Market Street; 40°35′54″N 77°34′25″W	Lewistown	Brick commercial building built in 1906.

== See also ==
- List of National Historic Landmarks in Pennsylvania
- National Register of Historic Places listings in Pennsylvania
- List of Pennsylvania state historical markers in Mifflin County
