= John C. Ewing =

- Born: March 4, 1843; Ligonier Valley, Pennsylvania
- Died: May 23, 1918 (aged 75); Johnstown, Pennsylvania
- Burial place: Ligonier Valley Cemetery
- Military career
- Allegiance: United States of America
- Branch: United States Army
- Service years: 1864–1865
- Rank: Private
- Units: Company E, 211th Pennsylvania Infantry
- Conflicts: Third Battle of Petersburg
- Awards: Medal of Honor

John C. Ewing (March 4, 1843 – May 23, 1918) was an American soldier who fought for the United States in the American Civil War. Ewing received the United States' highest award for bravery during combat, the Medal of Honor, for his action during the Third Battle of Petersburg in Virginia on April 2, 1865. He was honored with the award on May 20, 1865.

== Biography ==
Ewing was born in Ligonier Valley, Pennsylvania, on March 4, 1843. He enlisted in Company E of the 211th Pennsylvania Infantry on September 12, 1864, mustering out at the end of the war on June 2, 1865.

Ewing became a member of the Medal of Honor Legion in the 1890s, and marched with it in the ceremonies at the dedication of Grant's Tomb.

Ewing died on May 23, 1918, and his remains are interred at Ligonier Valley Cemetery in Pennsylvania.

== Medal of Honor citation ==
Captured the enemy flag.

== See also ==
- List of American Civil War Medal of Honor recipients: A–F
