= First Quality =

American manufacturing company

- Type: Private
- Industry: Manufacturing
- Founded: 1989
- Headquarters: Great Neck, NY
- Number of locations: 9 Facilities
- Key people: Allen Bodford (President of Absorbent Hygiene)
- Brands: Prevail, Cuties, Plenty, Panda, Incognito, Earth + Eden
- Number of employees: 5,000
- Divisions: First Quality Tissue, First Quality Absorbent Hygiene, First Quality Homecare, First Quality Healthcare
- Website: firstquality.com

First Quality Enterprises, also known as just First Quality, is an American multi-national manufacturing company, headquartered in Great Neck, New York. First Quality produces home care paper products, adult incontinence products, feminine care products, baby care, laundry and dishwasher detergent, and flexible packaging. They manufacture for both their brands and private label store brands.

First Quality was founded in McElhattan, Pennsylvania, by the Damaghi family, who immigrated to the United States from Iran, in 1988, opening their first facility in 1989. As of 2021, they have 9 total facilities, 8 in America and 2 in Canada.

== Brands and Divisions ==
First Quality has 4 public divisions: an absorbent products division producing baby diapers, menstrual pads and other toiletry items; a tissue division producing toilet paper and paper towels; a home care division producing detergent; and a print and packaging division producing plastic packaging.

Their brands are Prevail Adult Incontinence, Cuties Baby Diapers and Wipes, Plenty Paper Towels, Panda Bath Tissue, Incognito Menstrual Care, and Earth + Eden Baby Diapers and Wipes.

=== Cuties Baby Diapers and Wipes ===
Cuties is associated with First Quality's absorbent products division, being filed as a trademark in 1997.

The brand began manufacturing and selling baby diapers soon after, and wipes after that. The Obama Administration later partnered with Jet.com and Cuties in attempt to bridge the 'Diaper Gap' (the difficulty of buying diapers for low income families).

=== Prevail Adult Incontinence ===
Prevail is associated with First Quality's adult incontinence product business, being used since 1997 and filed as a trademark to First Quality Products, Inc. on July 29, 2004, and registered on July 13, 2005.

The brand began selling incontinence products soon after in competition with Depend.

== Philanthropy ==
First Quality gives charitable donations to charities such as Cradles to Crayons, United Way, Moisson Montréal, and the Susquehanna Health Foundation.

== Patents ==
First Quality holds patents related to their incontinence products which have been cited in later patent filings by other similar manufacturers, such as Procter & Gamble, Kimberly-Clark, Kao, Ontex, Medline Inc., and Attends.

== Locations ==
First Quality operates seven factories in the United States, and are opening an eighth in Defiance, OH:

- Great Neck, NY (Headquarters)
- Anderson, SC (Two facilities)
- Lewistown, PA
- Lock Haven, PA
- Macon, GA
- McElhattan, PA
- Salt Lake City, UT

They also operate 2 facilities in Canada:

- Drummondville, QC
- Concord, ON
