= John Lilley (soldier) =

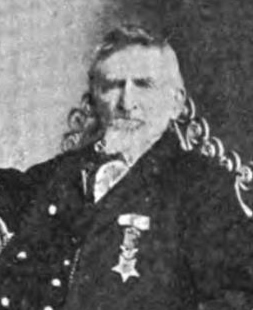
- John Lilley, c. 1901
- Born: February 1826; Mifflin County, Pennsylvania
- Died: May 12, 1902 (aged 75–76)
- Burial place: First Methodist Cemetery Lewistown, Pennsylvania
- Military career
- Branch: United States Army (Union)
- Service years: 1864 - 1865
- Rank: Private
- Units: Company F, 205th Pennsylvania Infantry
- Conflicts: American Civil War: Siege of Petersburg; Battle of Fort Stedman; Third Battle of Petersburg
- Awards: Medal of Honor

John Lilley (1826 – May 12, 1902) was a United States soldier who was recognized with his nation's highest award for valor, the U.S. Medal of Honor, for his gallantry during the American Civil War. While fighting with Company F of the 205th Pennsylvania Infantry as part of the Union Army engaged in the Third Battle of Petersburg, Virginia on April 2, 1865, he captured the flag of the Confederate States Army by single-handedly rushing, and forcing the surrender of, that army's color-bearer, along with several additional CSA soldiers.

== Formative years ==
Born in February 1826 in Mifflin County, Pennsylvania, John Lilley was a son of Pennsylvania natives William and Catherine Lilley (born, respectively, circa 1795 and 1806). In 1850, he was employed as a plasterer, and residing with his grandmother, Anna, at her home in Granville Township, Mifflin County. By 1860, he was a farmer residing in Lewistown, Granville Township with his parents, William and Catherine, and his brothers, Samuel and James (born, respectively, circa 1837 and 1849), as well as farm laborer, Samuel Jenkins, and domestic workers, Mary Brenan and Ella Hummel.

Sometime prior to this latter census, he became involved with the woman who would become the mother of his daughter, Annie Elizabeth (1859–1908), who was born on March 3, 1859. He continued to work and reside in Mifflin County during the early years of the American Civil War.

== Civil War ==
After enrolling for Civil War military service on August 27, 1864 at Lewistown, Pennsylvania, John Lilley then officially mustered in for duty at Camp Curtin in Harrisburg on September 1 as a private with Company F with the 205th Pennsylvania Infantry.

Transported by railroad to Fort Corcoran outside of Washington, D.C. and then to Camp Distribution, Lilley and his fellow 205th Pennsylvanians were initially assigned to picket, fatigue and other defense-related duties near City Point, Virginia. Attached briefly to the Army of the James beginning October 19, 1864, they were then re-assigned to the Army of the Potomac in November, and were placed under the command of Brigadier-General John F. Hartranft as part of the U.S. Army's 9th Corps. Encamped near Fort Prescott during the winter of that year, they guarded the Army Line Railroad during this phase of service. Their first major combat engagement came as part of the Siege of Petersburg, Virginia. Initially held in reserve during the Battle of Fort Stedman on March 25, 1865, they helped the Union Army capture a key portion of the Confederate Army's defensive as they swept over and through Fort Haskell.

While serving with his unit in Virginia in the Third Battle of Petersburg, Lilley rushed forward, alone, as his regiment began to waver and fall back in the face of intense enemy fire; at the point of his bayonet, he then captured the flag of the Confederate States Army and the CSA color-bearer charged with protecting it. Forcing several of the color-bearer's comrades to also surrender, he kept those prisoners under control, even when they realized that he was alone and that his regiment was withdrawing. In a post-battle report to his superiors, B Company Captain Joseph Holmes described how that day unfolded:

"On the night of the 1st instant ... at eleven o'clock, the regiment was ordered to form on the color line in front of the camp, Major Morrow in command. At one o'clock A.M., of the 2d, the regiment was moved towards, and on the Plank Road in rear of Fort Sedgwick, halted sometime, and then advanced by the right of the fort in the covered way, and formed in line of battle, with the Two Hundred and Seventh in front, directly in rear of our picket line. The order was given to charge the enemy's works at daylight, which was gallantly accomplished. The regiment captured Battery 30, with a number of prisoners; also one battle-flag fell into our hands, being captured by private John Lilly [sic], of Company F, who acted very gallantly throughout the engagement. This flag was forwarded to General Hartranft's headquarters, with a statement of its capture. Our colors were planted on the works, and remained there until the regiment was relieved.... In the advance upon the hostile works, and in driving out the enemy and holding the line when captured, the regiment was exposed to a fearful fire of infantry and artillery, from the effect of which it suffered heavy losses.

Advancing into and beyond Petersburg the next day, Lillie and his comrades made their way to Burkesville Junction, helping to repair segments of the South Side Railroad en route. Following the surrender of Confederate General Robert E. Lee at Appomattox, they then proceeded on to City Point and Alexandria, where they made camp on Seminary Hill, remaining there until mustering out for the final time on June 2, 1865.

== Post-war life ==
Following his honorable discharge from the military, John Lilley returned home, and resumed farming in Mifflin County, Pennsylvania. Sometime around 1867, he married. In 1880, he and his wife, Maria (1840–1906), resided in Granville Township with his daughter, Elizabeth. Also living with them were Wilson Dellet/Diller, an ore miner who was Maria's son from her first marriage, and John Ronson, a farm laborer who was boarding with the family. Shortly after the turn of the century, Lilley and his wife, Maria, and his daughter, Elizabeth, were still residing in Granville Township, Mifflin County. He died May 12, 1902, and was buried at the First Methodist Cemetery in Lewistown, Pennsylvania.

== Medal of Honor citation ==
Rank and organization: Private, Company F, 205th Pennsylvania Infantry. Place and date: At Petersburg, Va., April 2, 1865. Entered service at:------. Birth: Mifflin County, Pa. Date of issue: May 20, 1865.

Citation:

The President of the United States of America, in the name of Congress, takes pleasure in presenting the Medal of Honor to Private John Lilley, United States Army, for extraordinary heroism on 2 April 1865, while serving with Company F, 205th Pennsylvania Infantry, in action at Petersburg, Virginia. After his regiment began to waiver [sic] Private Lilley rushed on alone to capture the enemy flag. He reached the works and the Confederate Color Bearer who, at bayonet point, he caused to surrender with several enemy soldiers. He kept his prisoners in tow when they realized he was alone as his regiment in the meantime withdrew further to the rear.

== See also ==
- List of Medal of Honor recipients
- List of American Civil War Medal of Honor recipients: G–L
