= Indian Valley High School =

Indian Valley High School may refer to:

- Indian Valley High School (Ohio), Gnadenhutten, Ohio
- Indian Valley High School (Pennsylvania), Lewistown, Pennsylvania
