= Wollner Building =

- U.S. National Register of Historic Places
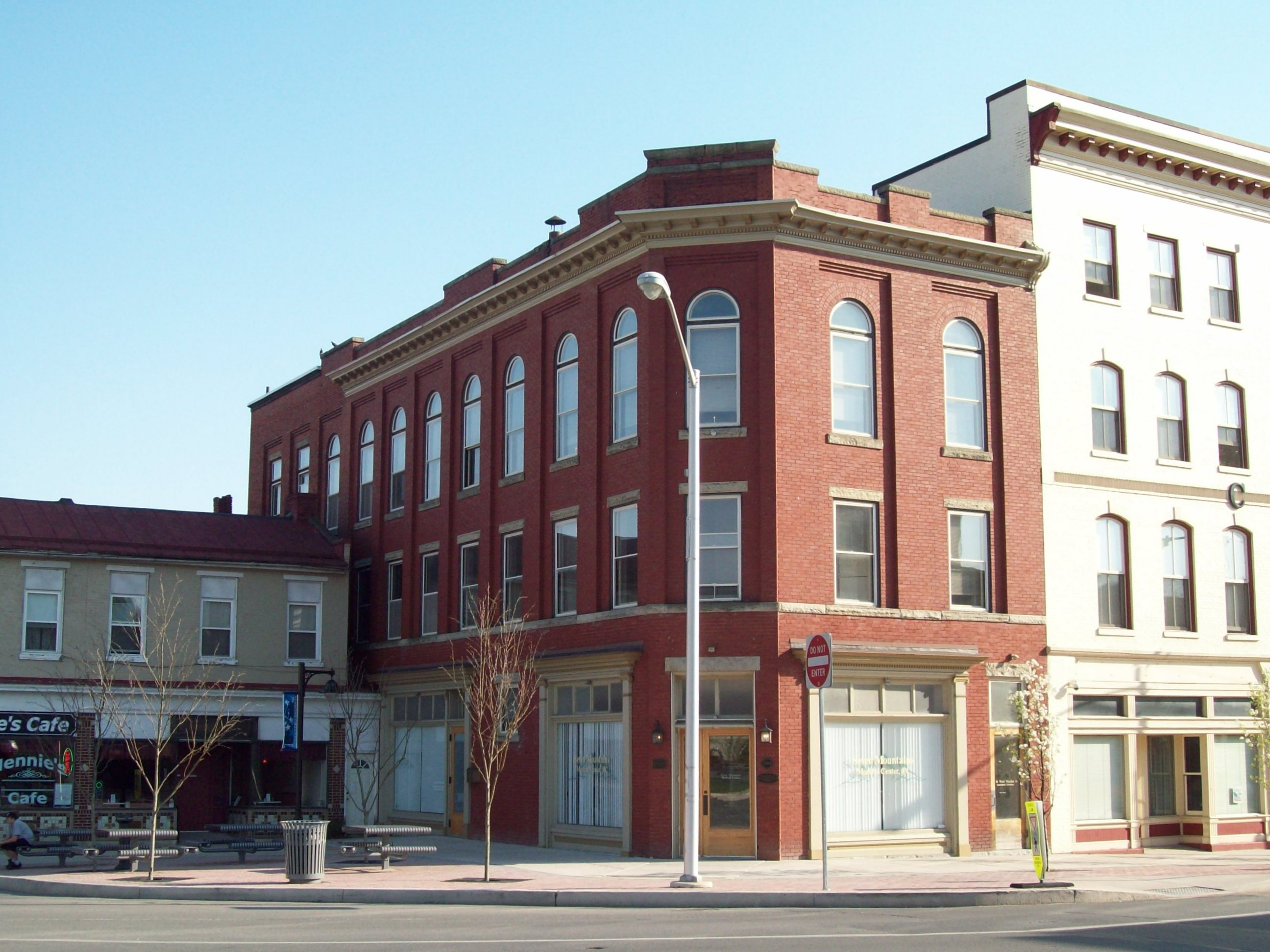
- Wollner Building, April 2010

- Location within Pennsylvania Location within the United States
- Location: 16 W. Market St., Lewistown, Pennsylvania
- Coordinates: 40°35′54″N 77°34′25″W
- Area: 0.1 acres (0.040 ha)
- Built: 1906
- Architect: Steinbach & Billmyer Co.
- NRHP reference No.: 84003499
- Added to NRHP: August 23, 1984

The Wollner Building is an historic commercial building that is located in Lewistown, Mifflin County, Pennsylvania, on Monument Square across from the Mifflin County Courthouse.

It was added to the National Register of Historic Places in 1984.

== History and architectural features ==
Built in 1906, this historic structure is a three-story, vernacular, brick building with a chamfered corner that measures approximately thirty feet by ninety feet, sits on a rusticated stone base and has three wood storefronts. Its significance lies in its architecture, its connection with the urbanization of Lewistown, and its association with Calvin Greene, a prominent local businessman and founder of the Lewistown Trust Company, which was housed there for many years.

Many locals remember the ground floor as Headings Drug Store. It operated at this location into the 1960s. Currently, the building houses the Seven Mountains Medical Center on the first floor with private apartments on the second and third floors.
