= Lewistown Armory =

- U.S. National Register of Historic Places
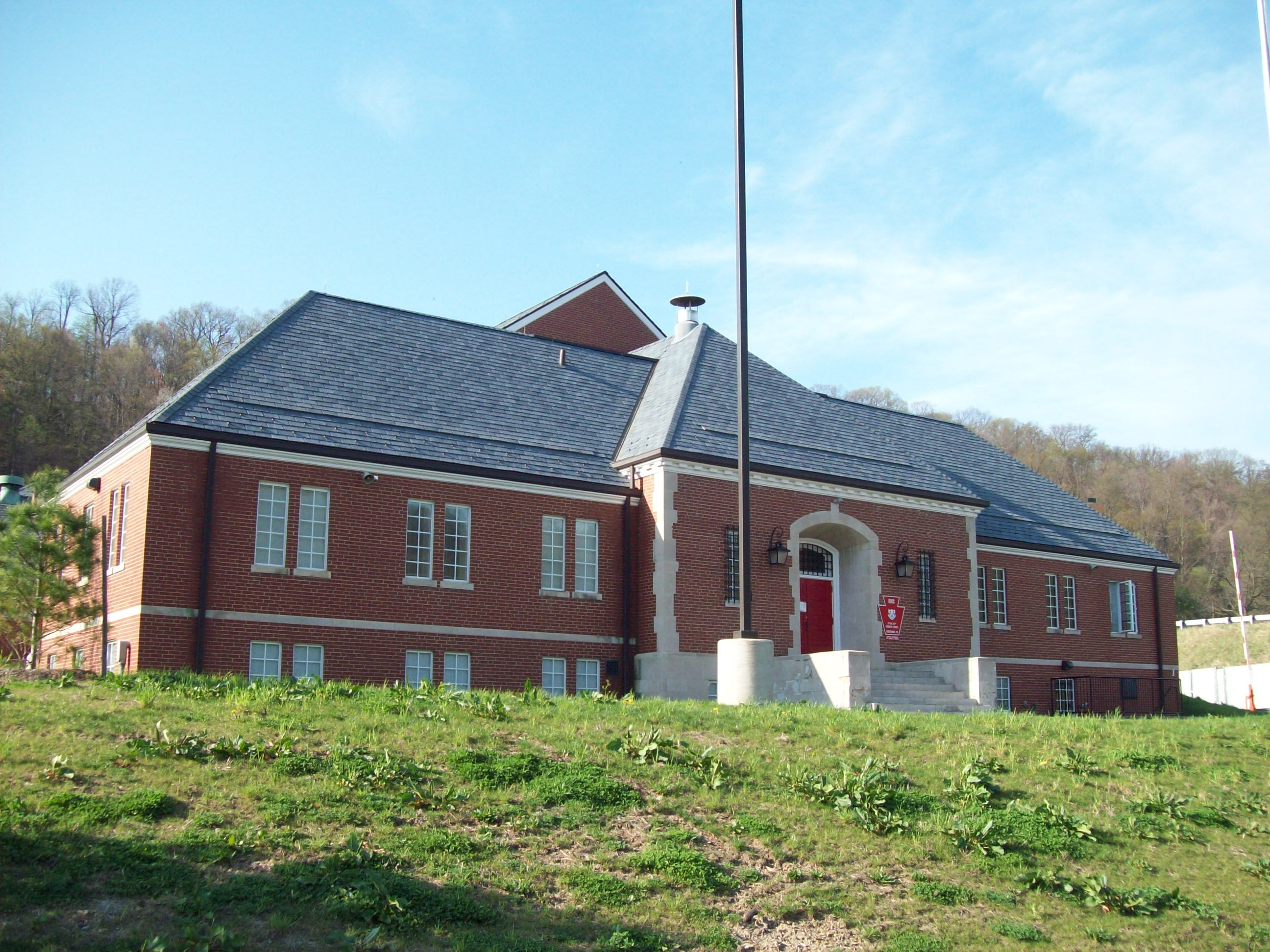
- Lewistown Armory, April 2010

- Location within Pennsylvania Location within the United States
- Location: 1101 Walnut Street, Derry Township, Pennsylvania
- Coordinates: 40°37′08″N 77°33′06″W
- Area: 22.7 acres (9.2 ha)
- Built: 1938
- Architect: Lawrie & Green
- Architectural style: Colonial Revival
- MPS: Pennsylvania National Guard Armories MPS
- NRHP reference No.: 91000513
- Added to NRHP: May 9, 1991

The Lewistown Armory is an historic National Guard armory that is located in Derry Township, Mifflin County, Pennsylvania just outside of Lewistown.

It was added to the National Register of Historic Places in 1991.

== History and architectural features ==
Built in 1938, this historic structure is a one-story, "I"-plan brick building with an exposed basement. Designed in the Colonial Revival style, it consists of a front administrative section with a drill hall and former stable area behind. The front and stable buildings have hipped roofs, while the drill hall has a gable roof. The drill hall measures sixty feet by ninety feet.
