= Embassy Theatre (Lewistown) =

- U.S. National Register of Historic Places
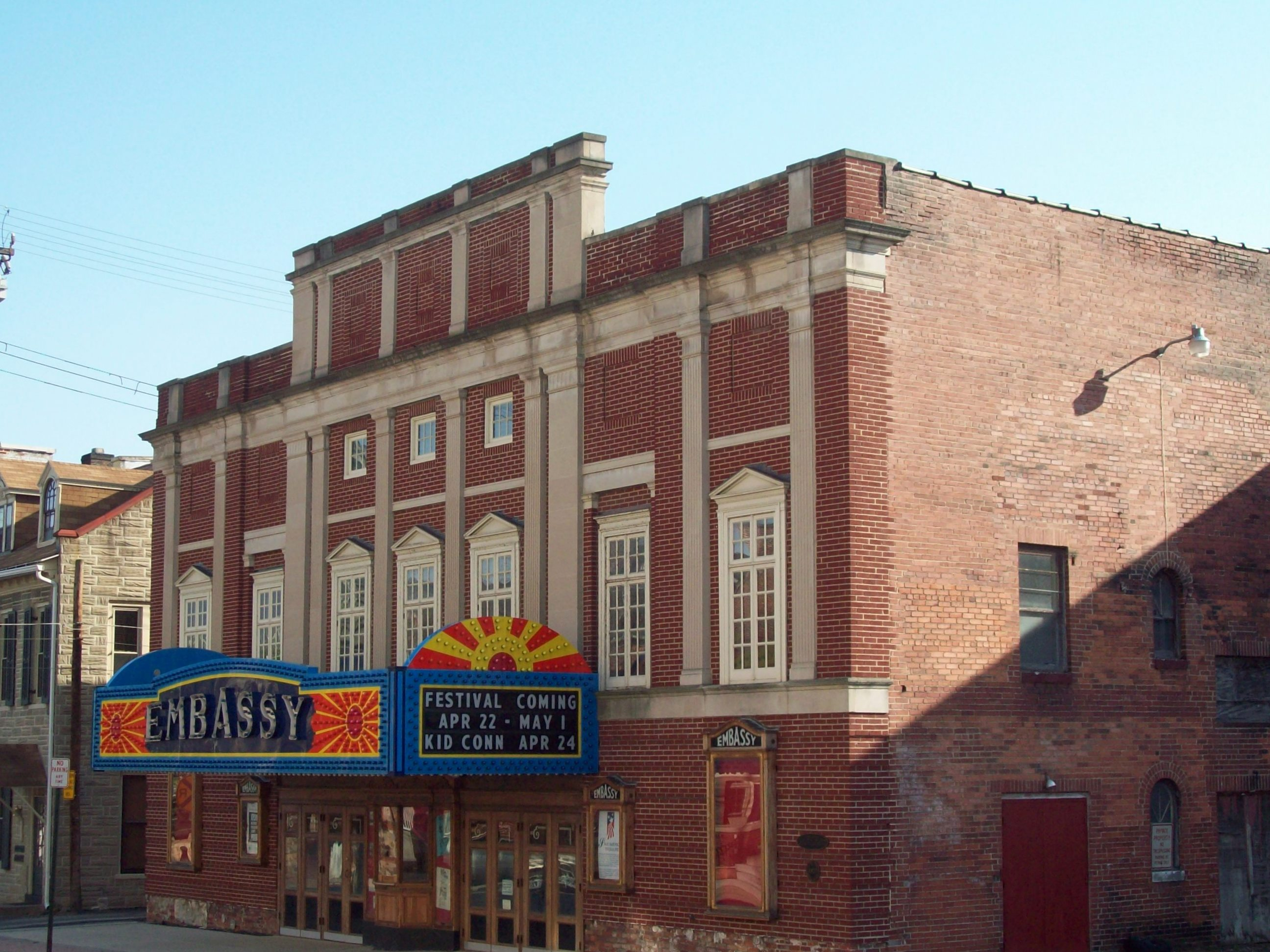
- Embassy Theatre, April 2010

- Location within Pennsylvania
- Location: 6 South Main Street, Lewistown, Pennsylvania
- Coordinates: 40°35′49″N 77°34′34″W
- Area: 0.1 acres (0.040 ha)
- Built: 1927
- Architect: Albert Douglas Hill; Haverstick-Borthwick Co.
- Architectural style: Colonial Revival
- NRHP reference No.: 98000899

The Embassy Theatre is a historic theatre building located on South Main Street in Lewistown, Mifflin County, Pennsylvania. It is a 1927 motion picture / vaudeville theatre, and is an excellent surviving example of theatre architecture of the 1920s. The original National Theatre building was built in 1916, and gutted in 1927 to be rebuilt as the Embassy. The front facade features eclectic Colonial Revival details. It has a rectangular marquee measuring 33 feet, 6 inches, by 10 feet, 6 inches, overall. The theatre closed in 1981, and is currently non operational and is undergoing restoration.

It was added to the National Register of Historic Places in 1998.

== See also ==
- National Register of Historic Places listings in Mifflin County, Pennsylvania
