= 211th Pennsylvania Infantry Regiment =

Union Army infantry regiment

211th Pennsylvania Volunteer Infantry
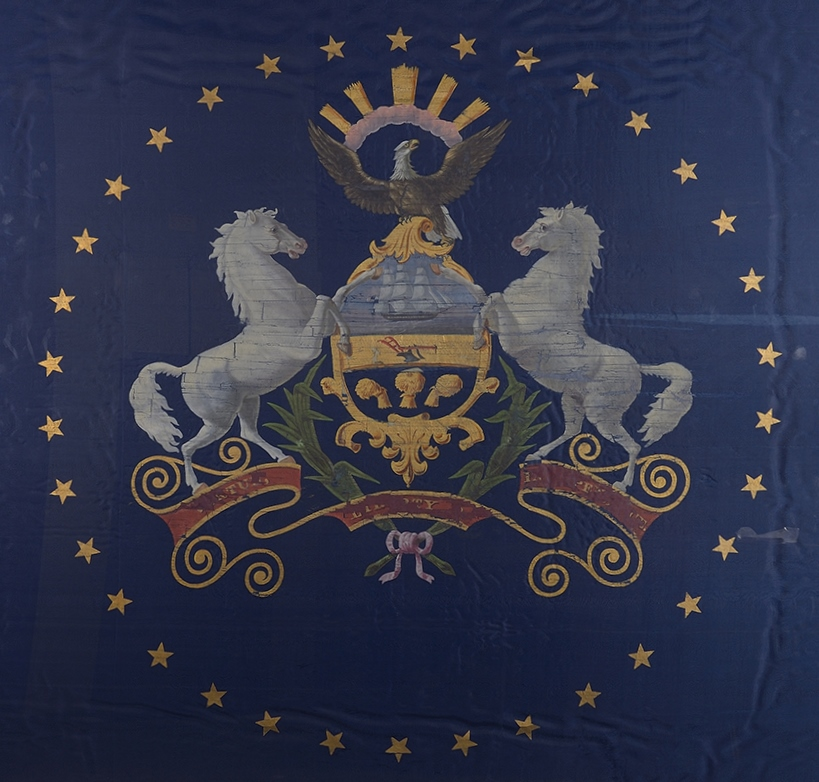
- State Flag of Pennsylvania, circa 1863.
- Active: 16 September 1864–2 June 1865
- Country: United States of America
- Allegiance: Union
- Branch: Union Army
- Role: Infantry
- Engagements: American Civil War

The 211th Regiment Pennsylvania Volunteer Infantry was an infantry regiment of the Union Army in the American Civil War. Raised in western Pennsylvania in September 1864, the regiment initially served with the Army of the James during the Siege of Petersburg, holding trenches at Bermuda Hundred. In late November it transferred to the Army of the Potomac and during the northern hemisphere spring campaign fought in the counterattack during the Battle of Fort Stedman and the Union breakthrough at Petersburg. During the last days of the Appomattox Campaign it guarded trains, and participated in the Grand Review of the Armies following the end of the war before mustering out.

== History ==
=== Formation and Army of the James service ===
The 211th Pennsylvania was raised in western Pennsylvania during September 1864 in response to President Abraham Lincoln's call for 500,000 men. A large number of its soldiers were veterans on their second enlistment. Company A was composed of men recruited in Crawford County, Company B in Jefferson County, Company C in McKean and Jefferson Counties, Company D in Mercer County, Companies E, H, I, and K in Westmoreland County, Company F in Erie County, and Company G in Warren County. The ten companies of the regiment moved to Camp Reynolds near Pittsburgh, where they were organized on 16 September under the command of volunteer officer Colonel James H. Trimble. After completing its organization, the 211th Pennsylvania was sent to the front and took up positions in the trenches at Bermuda Hundred, Virginia on 20 September; it joined the Provisional Brigade of the Defenses of Bermuda Hundred of the Army of the James in the Siege of Petersburg, Virginia.

Soon after its arrival at the front, the regiment mounted the parapets of its trenches and exposed itself to Confederate fire to divert attention from the successful Union attack on Fort Harrison; two men of Company F were killed by a single shell during this action. The regiment held a picket line from the James River opposite Dutch Gap through dense woods to its camp in a cleared area whose apex projected near the Confederate line. Fraternization between the opposing pickets was routine, but this state of affairs ended when Confederate division commander George Pickett launched a night attack on 17 November that captured 54 Union pickets and the angle, where a redoubt was constructed. Union commander Ulysses S. Grant considered retaking it inadvisable, and from this point hostilities in earnest resumed in the regimental sector, forcing its soldiers to remain under cover while in the trenches.

=== Army of the Potomac service during late 1864 and early 1865 ===
The regiment and the rest of the Pennsylvania regiments which formed the Provisional Brigade were relieved by a United States Colored Troops brigade on 27 November and transferred to the IX Corps of the Army of the Potomac, holding positions on the southern bank of the Appomattox River. The brigade was organized during December into the 3rd Division of the corps, commanded by Brigadier General John F. Hartranft. The 211th became part of the 2nd Brigade of Colonel Joseph A. Mathews alongside the 205th and 207th Pennsylvania. During the northern hemisphere winter of 1864–1865, the regiment spent most of its time training. This routine was broken by its participating in several forays without being involved in fighting, supporting the Weldon Railroad expedition between 7 and 11 December and the Battle of Hatcher's Run from 5 to 7 February 1865, doing much fortifying in the latter. Trimble resigned on 18 March, and was replaced in command by Lieutenant Colonel Levi A. Dodd. The regiment encamped in the rear of IX Corps halfway between Fort Howard and Fort Alexander Hays on the Army Line Railroad, a supporting position on the far left of the division.

=== Fort Stedman ===
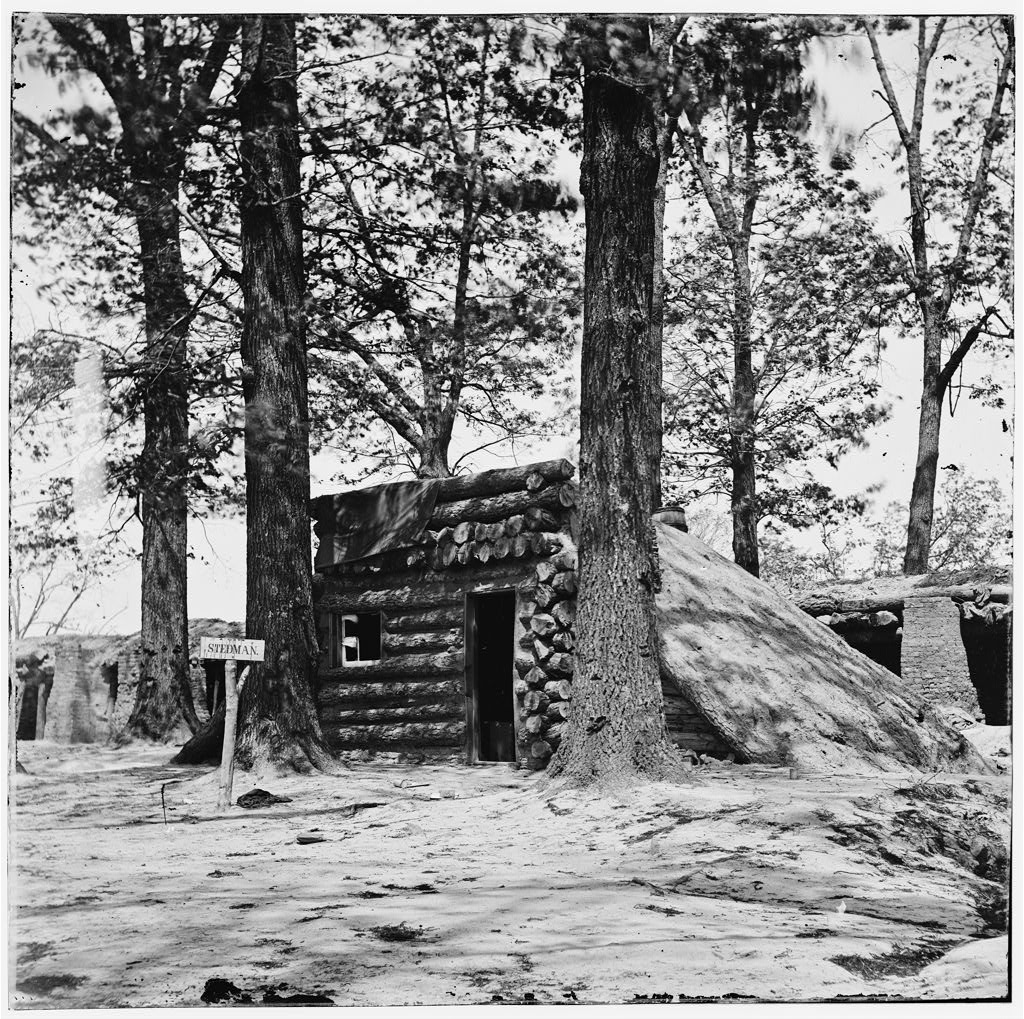
A bombproof at Fort Stedman

When Fort Stedman was captured by a Confederate attack before dawn on 25 March, the regiment was in camp almost four miles away. Command devolved on Captain William A. Coulter of Company D as Dodd was sick in hospital and Major Augustus A. Mechling was absent. The regiment was ordered to march to the division headquarters, arriving there by 06:30. Having formed up on the high open ground near Meade Station to the rear of Fort Stedman, the relatively large regiment with almost 600 men advanced in line in accordance with Hartranft's plan to use it to draw Confederate artillery fire. Hartranft led the advance, which was the signal for the attack of the rest of the division. The fort was quickly recaptured after the Union counterattack resulted in the retreat of the exhausted Confederate troops; the 211th Pennsylvania lost one killed and ten wounded in the fighting while capturing the rear of the fort.

=== Petersburg breakthrough and Appomattox ===
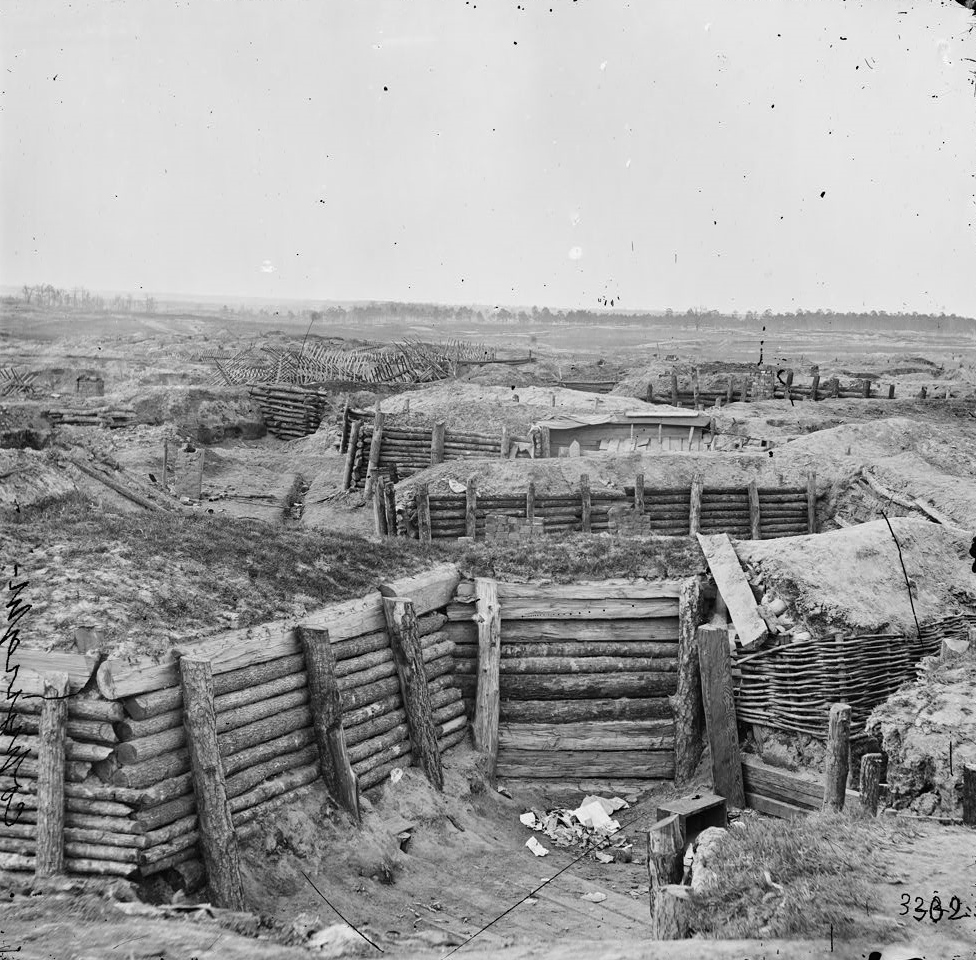
Confederate defenses of Fort Mahone at Petersburg, Virginia, 1865, where the regiment fought on 2 April

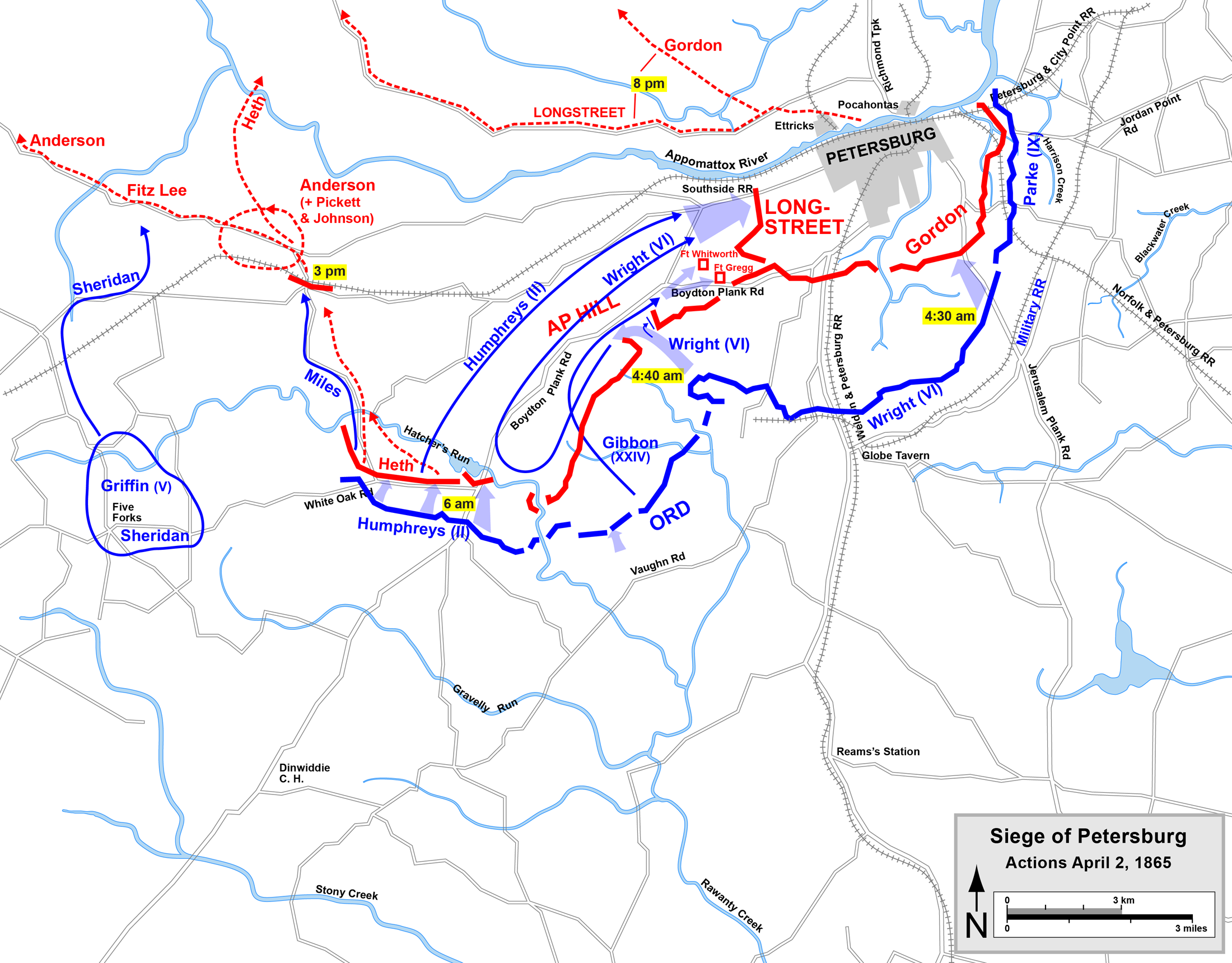
A map of the 2 April actions at Petersburg; the 211th was part of Parke's IX Corps

The regiment fought in the Appomattox Campaign between 28 March and 9 April, during which it participated in the Union breakthrough at Petersburg on 2 April. The regiment prepared for the assault along with the rest of the division on the night of 30 March, but it was postponed until the morning of 2 April. After marching to the camp of the 207th Pennsylvania just before midnight on 1 April, the 211th moved to the front at 03:30 on 2 April, and took positions alongside the brigade with its left on the Jerusalem Plank Road. Lieutenant Albert Alexander of Company D commanded a detail of pioneers from the brigade, which cut down the abatis and chevaux de frise in front of the Confederate positions despite artillery fire. Behind the pioneers, the division advanced, with the 211th closely behind the 207th and 205th Pennsylvania in the column of the brigade. Dodd led the 211th and elements of the 207th towards Fort Mahone after the initial breakthrough and captured it, then brought artillerymen up to turn the guns around. The regiment repulsed multiple counterattacks in fierce fighting, suffering a total of 135 casualties: four officers and seventeen men killed, four officers and 89 men wounded, and 21 missing. Among the dead were Lieutenant Colonel Charles McLain and Alexander, while Major Elias B. Lee was mortally wounded. Privates John C. Ewing of Company E and Amzi D. Harmon of Company K were awarded the Medal of Honor for capturing the flags of the 61st Alabama and the 45th North Carolina, respectively.

On the night of 3 April, the Confederate Army of Northern Virginia retreated from Petersburg, which the division entered on the following morning, meeting little resistance. The 211th picketed the bank of the Appomattox River and saved the railroad bridge and part of the foot bridge from fires started by Confederate forces before marching back to camp in midday. During the pursuit of the Confederate forces it guarded the trains as the army advanced along the Southside Railroad, receiving news of the Confederate surrender at Nottoway Court House on 9 April. The 211th remained there until 20 April, then moved to City Point and lastly Alexandria between 20 and 28 April, where it remained until mustering out. After participating in the Grand Review of the Armies on 23 May, it mustered out on 2 June. During its service, the regiment lost six officers and 38 men killed or mortally wounded, and 53 men to disease, for a total of 97.

== Monuments ==
The designation of the 211th Pennsylvania is inscribed on the monument to Hartranft's division on the site of Fort Mahone in Petersburg. Its 1909 dedication was attended by veterans of the regiment and the entire division.

== See also ==
- List of Pennsylvania Civil War regiments
- Pennsylvania in the Civil War
