= List of Pennsylvania state historical markers in Mifflin County =

Location of Mifflin County in Pennsylvania

This is a list of the Pennsylvania state historical markers in Mifflin County.

This is intended to be a complete list of the official state historical markers placed in Mifflin County, Pennsylvania by the Pennsylvania Historical and Museum Commission (PHMC). The locations of the historical markers, as well as the latitude and longitude coordinates as provided by the PHMC's database, are included below when available. There are 12 historical markers located in Mifflin County.

== Historical markers ==
Marker title	Image	Date dedicated	Location	Marker type	Topics
Chief Logan		March 31, 1947	SR 1005 (old U.S. 322), .5 mile N of Reedsville; 40.67548°N 77.60004°W	Roadside	Native American
Fort Granville		March 27, 1947	1200 W. 4th St. (U.S. 22 & 522), Lewistown; 40.58839°N 77.6016°W	Roadside	Forts, French & Indian War, Military
Fort Granville - PLAQUE		May 1, 1916	1200 W. 4th St. (US 22 & 522), Lewistown; 40.58837°N 77.60164°W	Plaque	Forts, French & Indian War, Military, Native American
Freedom Forge		March 31, 1947	SR 1005 (old U.S. 322) at Burnham; 40.62918°N 77.56736°W	Roadside	Business & Industry, Iron, Steel
Joseph T. Rothrock		April 1, 1947	U.S. 22 & 522 at McVeytown; 40.49956°N 77.74042°W	Roadside	Environment, Professions & Vocations
Juniata Iron		August 21, 1947	U.S. 22 & 522 at Strodes Mills, 4.9 miles SW of Lewistown; 40.5482°N 77.67725°W	Roadside	Business & Industry, Coal, Iron
Lewistown Station		October 19, 1996	Jct. Pa. 103 & Helen St., S end of Lewistown	Roadside	Business & Industry, Railroads, Transportation
McCoy Home		March 27, 1967	17 N. Main St., Lewistown; 40.59805°N 77.57505°W	City	Military, Military Post-Civil War
Mifflin County		September 19, 1981	Old Courthouse, Monument Square, Market & Main Sts., Lewistown; 40.59761°N 77.57488°W	City	Canals, Government & Politics, Government & Politics 18th Century, Governors, Iron
Old Arch Bridge		March 28, 1947	Bus. 22, just E of Lewistown; 40.58467°N 77.55741°W	Roadside	Bridges, Transportation
Three Locks		April 1, 1947	US 22/522 near Strodes Run Rd./Middle Rd., at Strodes Mills, 4.6 miles SW of Lewistown; 40.55132°N 77.67265°W	Roadside	Canals, Navigation, Transportation
Travel History		March 28, 1947	US 22/322 westbound at Bus. 22 exit, near Lewistown	Roadside	Bridges, Canals, Navigation, Roads, Transportation

== See also ==
- List of Pennsylvania state historical markers
- National Register of Historic Places listings in Mifflin County, Pennsylvania
