= Montgomery Ward Building (Lewistown, Pennsylvania) =

- U.S. National Register of Historic Places
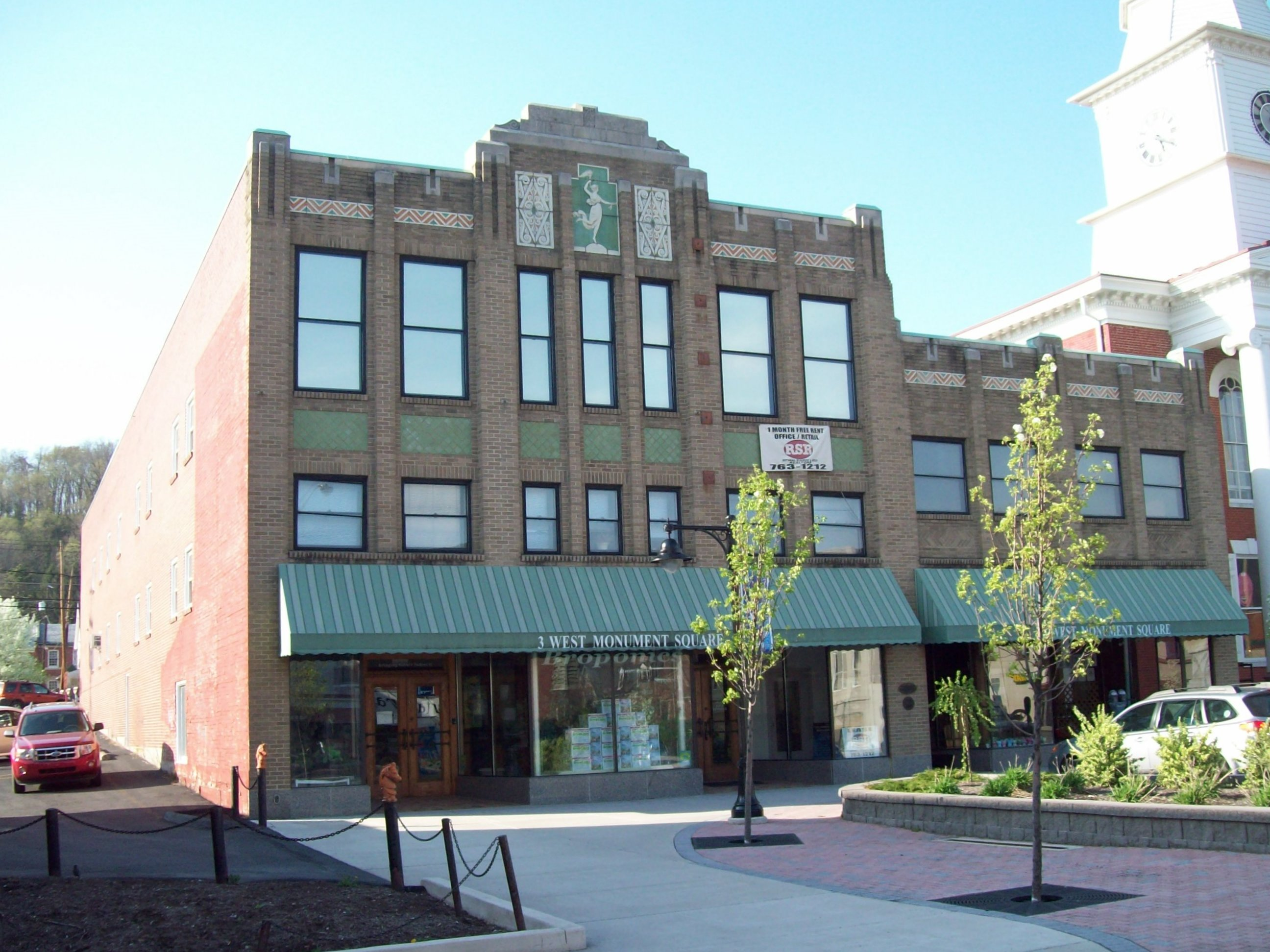
- Front of the building

- Location within Pennsylvania Location within the United States
- Location: 3-7 W. Market St., Lewistown, Pennsylvania
- Coordinates: 40°35′54″N 77°34′25″W
- Area: 0.3 acres (0.12 ha)
- Built: 1929
- Architect: G. Frank Witman; James A. Royer
- Architectural style: Art Deco
- NRHP reference No.: 84003497
- Added to NRHP: September 7, 1984

The Montgomery Ward Building is an historic department store building in Lewistown, Mifflin County, Pennsylvania, United States.

It was added to the National Register of Historic Places in 1984.

== History and architectural features ==
The east facade of this historic structure faces the Mifflin County Courthouse on Monument Square. One of the initial retail outlets constructed by the Montgomery Ward Company, this building was erected in 1929. Designed in the Art Deco style, it consists of the store building and attached office building. The store is two-stories, with a mezzanine level and measures approximately 40 feet by 150 feet. The office building is two-stories and measures approximately 30 feet by 145 feet. They are both of steel frame construction with brick exterior walls and feature terra cotta ornamentation.

This is an impressive example of Art Deco style architecture which includes two-story bay windows and pilasters, bands of glazed terra-cotta panels and a female figure holding a torch. This image was a standard Montgomery Ward logo known as the "Spirit of Progress." The building suffered a major fire on December 20, 1936 but was renovated and the business thrived until Montgomery Ward went out of business in the early 1980s.

The entire building was remodeled into offices in the 1980s and currently houses a variety of businesses including In Home Services of Central PA, United Cerebral Palsy, Snowflake's On The Square Christmas Shop, and the Mifflin-Juniata Arts Council.
