= Kelly Harper =

American singer-songwriter

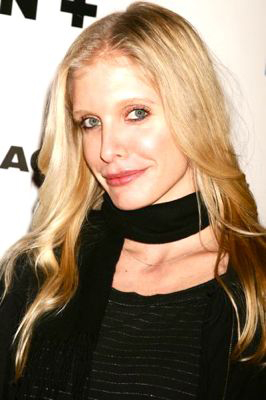

Kelly Marie Harper (born June 28, 1979 known professionally as Kelly Harper, is an American recording artist and singer-songwriter. Harper's debut hit song "New Best Friend" charted at number 38 on Billboard's Top 40 CHR charts. She has had 8 of her songs placed on Oxygen network hit show The Bad Girls Club, Love Games, licensed to MTV's Road Rules, and Real World, and VH1's Living Lohan show. Harper won best song in "Songwriter Universe Magazine" for her acclaimed hit "Till This Goes Away" co-written by multiplatinum award-winning producer/songwriter Rob Wells. She was signed to Feenix Rising Entertainment through former Columbia Records exec Len Nicholson and Amerie.

== 1997–1999 Early life and career beginnings ==
Harper was born and raised in the small town of Lewistown, Pennsylvania. An introverted young girl Kelly found her joy in music. At the age of 8 she began by singing in the local chorus and writing poetry. By age 10 her mother bought a piano. Harper taught herself how to play it and started to turn her poetry into songs. After graduating high school, Kelly's door to fame opened when a modeling agency signed her and took her to New York City for four years.

== 1999–2007 ==
Harper was born and raised in Lewistown, PA. She moved to Los Angeles in 1999 and walked away from a modeling career. Kelly began writing and playing with local musicians and songwriters instantly. Her first album "New Best Friend" gained immediate exposure and buzz as her song landed on the Billboards Top 40/CHR charts at No. 38. Hollywood music supervisor Debra Baum chose the song "New Best Friend" from a catalog of over a thousand songs for placement in the feature film "Thanks to Gravity." as well as being placed on the Oxygen Networks top rated show's 'The Bad Girls Club'. 'Love Games, MTV's 'Road Rules', 'The Real World', and 'Living Lohan' Show.

== 2007–present ==
Harper began writing with Multi Platinum Award Winner Producer/Songwriter "Rob Wells" and together they immediately gained attention with placements winning the best song for " Till this goes away" in Songwriter Universe magazine. The song placed as a top 10 finalist in the International Songwriting Competition in the Top40/Pop category. Harper wrote a song on her EP with Christopher Ward best known for Black Velvet By Alannah Myles. Harper is back in the studio working on her soon to be released second studio album fall 2013.
