= Old Stone Arch Bridge (Lewistown, Pennsylvania) =

- U.S. National Register of Historic Places
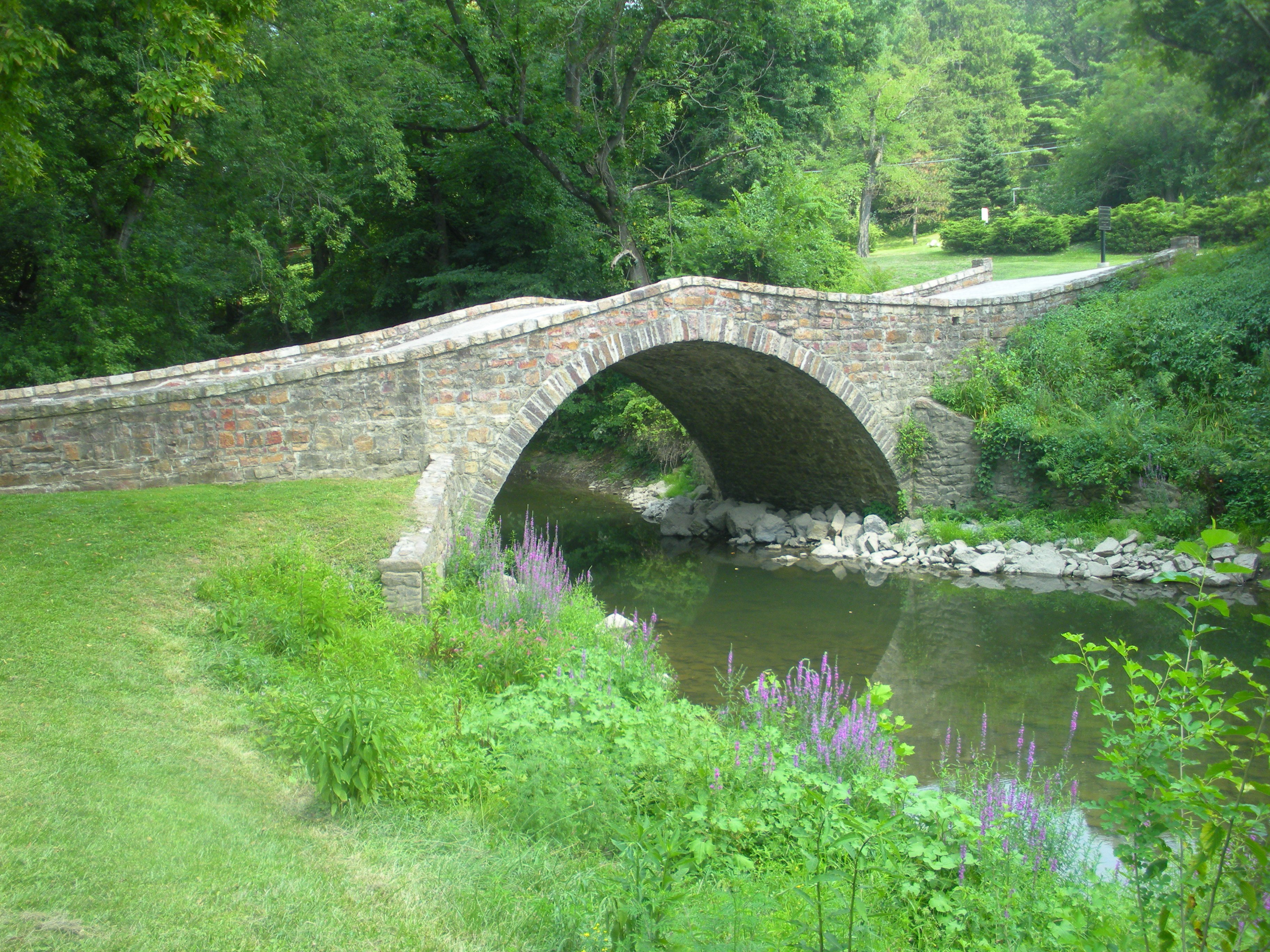

- Location within Pennsylvania Location within the United States
- Location: Over Jack's Creek, southeast of Lewistown, Pennsylvania
- Coordinates: 40°35′04″N 77°33′23″W
- Area: 2 acres (0.81 ha)
- Built: 1813
- Built by: Diehl, Philip
- NRHP reference No.: 09000096
- Added to NRHP: April 18, 1979

The Old Stone Arch Bridge is a single-span, stone, arch bridge that crosses Jack's Creek connecting Lewiston and Derry Township, Mifflin County, Pennsylvania.

It is the oldest bridge of its type in central Pennsylvania.

== History and architectural features ==
Philip Diehl built this bridge in 1813 as part of the Harrisburg to Pittsburgh Turnpike. The turnpike had been authorized in 1807, and the section from Harrisburg to Lewistown, on which the bridge lies, was completed in 1818.

Lithographers Currier and Ives made prints of the bridge in 1850.
