= McCoy House (Lewistown, Pennsylvania) =

Historic house in Pennsylvania, United States

- U.S. National Register of Historic Places
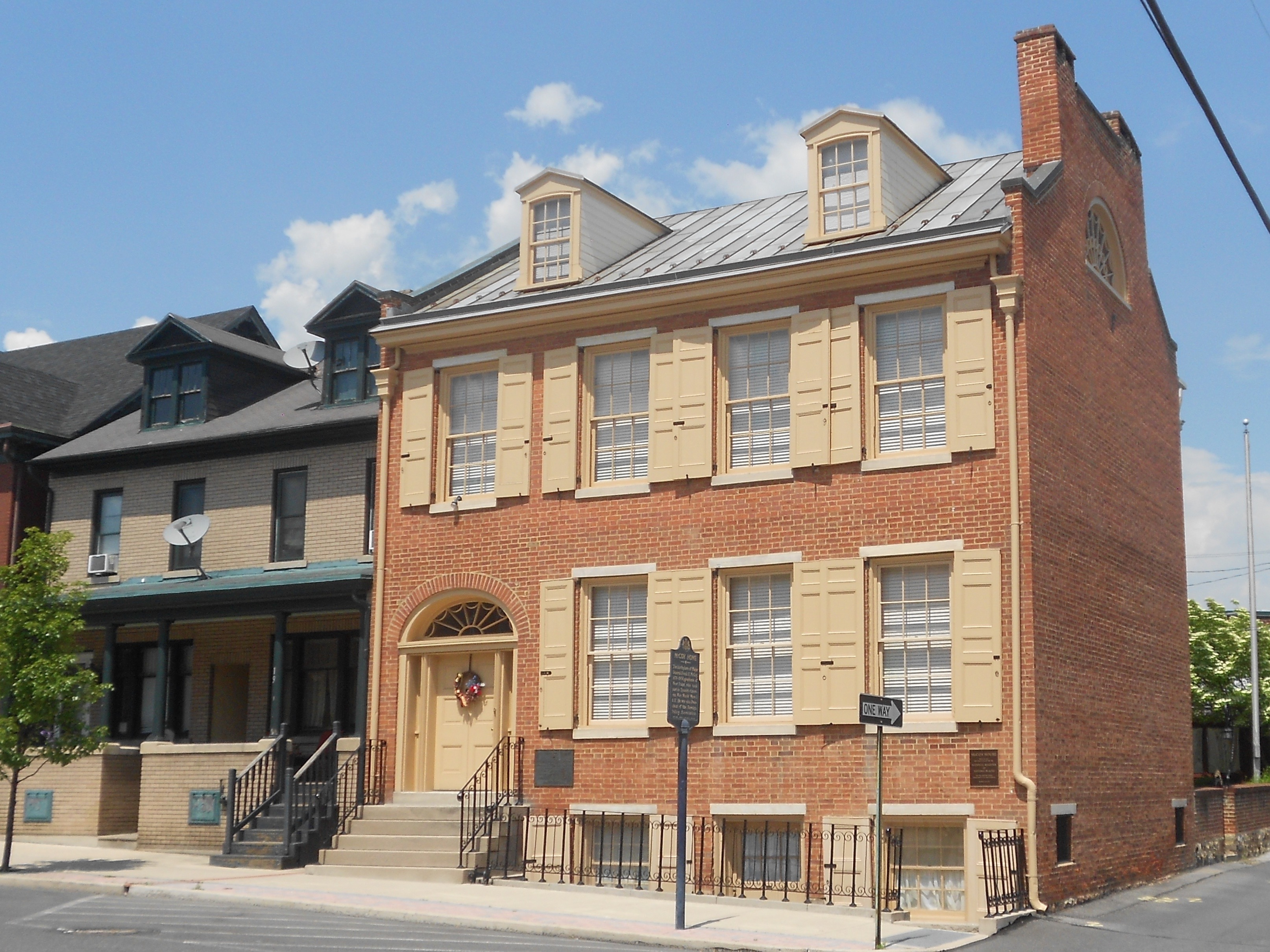
- McCoy House, May 2016

- Location within Pennsylvania Location within the United States
- Interactive map showing the location of McCoy House
- Location: 17 N. Main St., Lewistown, Pennsylvania
- Coordinates: 40°35′53″N 77°34′31″W
- Area: less than one acre
- Built: 1836-1843, 1874
- Architectural style: Federal
- NRHP reference No.: 73001641
- Added to NRHP: March 14, 1973

McCoy House is a historic home located at Lewistown, Mifflin County, Pennsylvania, across from the Mifflin County Courthouse. It was built between 1836 and 1843, and is a 2 1/2-story, brick and frame dwelling in the Federal style. It has a gable roof and a double chimney linked at the base. Frank Ross McCoy was born in the house in 1874.

It was added to the National Register of Historic Places in 1973.

McCoy House is now owned by the Mifflin County Historical Society and serves as a museum of local history.
