= El McMeen =

American lawyer (born 1947)

Elmer Ellsworth McMeen, III (known as El McMeen) (born June 3, 1947 in Lewistown, Pennsylvania), is an acoustic steel-string fingerstyle guitarist. His specialty is fingerstyle arrangements of sung or strongly melodic pieces, ranging from the Irish genre, to hymns, gospel tunes and pop music. He has also composed instrumentals for guitar, and has published a book of Irish and Scottish instrumental music that he arranged for classical string trio (violin, viola and cello). That book is called Celtic Treasures for String Trio (Piney Ridge, 2005). He plays and arranges guitar music almost exclusively in the CGDGAD tuning. (That tuning, developed by English guitarist Dave Evans in the 1960s, is similar to a Hawaiian slack-key tuning [CGCGAD] called "C Niʻihau" tuning.) Acoustic Guitar magazine (Oct. 2001, No. 106) called McMeen "the king of CGDGAD tuning".

McMeen has also arranged many pieces of music in Dropped D tuning (DADGBE), and has written The Art of Dropped D Guitar, published by Mel Bay Publications, Inc. He is profiled in Marquis’ Who’s Who in the World.

McMeen practiced law as his primary vocation in New York City for many years, and was a partner in the New York City law firm of LeBoeuf, Lamb, Greene & MacRae, LLP for 21 years, until his retirement in 2000. After retirement from law, he has pursued music and Christian ministry work full-time.

== Biography ==
El McMeen was born in Lewistown, Pennsylvania in 1947, and moved with his family to Huntingdon, Pennsylvania, in 1960. Through freshman year in college, he played clarinet as a solo instrument, as well as in band and orchestra settings. He studied piano, and sang in choral groups. He attended public schools in Lewistown and Huntingdon, Pennsylvania, before attending Mt. Hermon School (now called Northfield Mt. Hermon School), graduating in 1965. He graduated from Harvard College in 1969, and the University of Pennsylvania Law School in 1972, in each case with Honors. He was an Editor of the University of Pennsylvania Law Review. He has been married to the former Sheila Taenzler since 1971, and has three sons—Jonathan, Daniel and James—and a daughter, Mary.

McMeen started learning guitar as a senior at Mt. Hermon. At first, he did not approach the guitar primarily as a solo instrument, but used it as accompaniment for his singing. Upon reapplying himself in the early 1980s to the instrument, he encountered what he saw as an incredible breadth of music that one could try to render on guitar. He found himself attracted to Irish and Scottish music, alternative tunings, and different approaches to rendering and arranging music. McMeen’s playing is characterized by melodic emphasis, economy and great beauty of sound. His natural voice-like phrasing and skill at ornamentation and improvisation create a musical flow that gives the listener the impression he is hearing the piece for the first time, each time it is played. His improvisational approach to pieces creates an atmosphere of warm and personal immediacy. Guitar Player Magazine (Vol. 29, No. 2, 1995) referred to his music as "drop-dead gorgeous".

== Discography ==
=== Solo albums ===
- Of Soul and Spirit (Shanachie 97012; 1991)
- Irish Guitar Encores (Shanachie 97017; 1992)
- Solo Guitar Serenade (Piney Ridge 104; 1994)
- Playing Favorites (Piney Ridge 105; 1996)
- Acoustic Guitar Treasures (Piney Ridge 106; 1998)
- El McMeen Live (Piney Ridge 107; 2000)
- The Lea Rig (Piney Ridge 108; 2001)
- Breakout (Piney Ridge 109; 2002)
- Dancing the Strings (Piney Ridge 110; 2004)
- The Soul of Christmas Guitar (Piney Ridge 111; 2004)
- Amazing Grace (Piney Ridge 112; 2006)
- At-Home Picking...and Talking (2010)
- The Spirit of Christmas Guitar (Piney Ridge 114; 2018)
- Celtic Guitar Treasures (Piney Ridge 115; 2018)
- Gospel Guitar Treasures (Piney Ridge 116; 2018)
- Fingerstyle Americana (Piney Ridge 118; 2020)
- For the Ladies (Piney Ridge 119; 2020)
- Guitar Favorites in 3/4 Time (Piney Ridge 120; 2020)
- El McMeen Live and Personal (Piney Ridge 121; 2020)

=== Compilations ===
- Celtic Treasure (Narada; 1996)
- A Celtic Tapestry (Shanachie; 1996)
- Ramble to Cashel (Rounder; 1998)
- The Blarney Pilgrim (Rounder; 1998)
- High on the Mountain (Acoustic; 1999)
- Great Strings, Great Music (W. L. Gore & Associates; 1999)
- Acoustic Music Resource Sampler (AMR; 1999)
- Great Strings, Great Music, Vol.2 (W. L. Gore & Associates; 2000)
- Narada Presents the Best of Celtic Christmas (Narada; 2002)

== DVD ==
- Guitar Artistry of El McMeen (Vestapol 13112)

=== DVD guitar lessons (Stefan Grossman's guitar workshop) ===
- Irish Guitar Encores (GW 916)
- Christmas Carols and Songs for Fingerstyle Guitar (GW 923)
- Sacred Music for Fingerstyle Guitar (GW 911)

== Books ==
=== Guitar ===
- The Art of Dropped D Guitar (Mel Bay, 20467BCD)
- Celtic Guitar Treasures
- The Soul of Christmas Guitar
- Of Soul and Spirit (Mel Bay)
- Irish Guitar Encores (Mel Bay)
- Solo Guitar Serenade (Mel Bay)
- Playing Favorites (Mel Bay)
- Acoustic Guitar Treasures (Mel Bay)
- The Mel Bay Complete Celtic Fingerstyle Guitar Book (Mel Bay,95217BCD;co-author w/Stefan Grossman and Duck Baker)
- Mel Bay Master Anthology of Fingerstyle Guitar Solos, Volume 1 (Mel Bay,98370BCD;contributor)

=== String Trio ===
- Celtic Treasures for String Trio

=== Other ===
- Hard Times: A Christian Guide for Getting Through Them (2007)
- Do You Have Time for Some Good News! (2007)
- Unforgiveness: A Christian Guide to Tearing Down That Wall (2008)
- The Good News Is ... Freedom (2007)
- Two Snowflakes Walk Into a Bar (BookLocker; 2014)
- Objection! Overruled! (Or, Two Lawyers Have a Little "Chat" about God and Hell) (with Steve Baughman)(BookLocker; 2013)
- Growing Up in God's Country" (BookLocker; 2018)
- Holy Holophrase! Naming Your Favorite Aggravations (BookLocker; 2021)

== Sources ==
- Interview by Mel Bay Guitar Publications with El McMeen, http://elmcmeen.com/El%20Mel%20Bay%20Interview%202000.pdf
- The National Law Journal (July 1, 1991),"Strumming Along With the Law" (by Sheryl Nance)
- Guitar Player (October 1992),"El McMeen: Irish Ears Are Smiling" (by Kevin Ransom)
- Acoustic Guitar (May–June 1993), "Solo: Six-String Choir" (by Patrick G. Grant)
- Fingerstyle Guitar (Sept–Oct 1996),"Artist Profile" (by Jeff Miller)
- Acoustic Guitar (Sept.-Oct. 1998),"Hit List" (by Russell Letson)
- Acoustic Guitar (No. 106, 2001),"Hit List" (by Art Edelstein)
- Acoustic Guitar (June 2004),"CD Review" (by Celine Keating)
- Dirty Linen (Dec.2004– Jan. 2005),"Holiday Releases" (by Michael Parrish)
- Acoustic Guitar (Nov.2007),"Private Lesson" (by Doug Young)
- NJ Herald (Feb.22, 2008), El McMeen: A Different Kind of Musician" (by Robert Price)
