= Amzi D. Harmon =

Medal of Honor recipient (1845–1927)

- Born: October 9, 1845; Wilkinsburg, Pennsylvania, US
- Died: October 9, 1927 (aged 82)
- Burial place: St. Cloud, Florida, US
- Military career
- Allegiance: United States; Union
- Branch: United States Army; Union Army
- Rank: Corporal
- Units: Company K, 211th Pennsylvania Infantry
- Conflicts: American Civil War: Third Battle of Petersburg
- Awards: Medal of Honor

Amzi Davis Harmon (April 18, 1845 – October 9, 1927) was an American soldier who fought in the American Civil War. Harmon received the United States' highest award for bravery during combat, the Medal of Honor. Harmon's medal was won for his capturing of a Confederate States Army flag during the Third Battle of Petersburg, in Virginia on April 2, 1865. He was honored with the award on May 20, 1865.

Harmon was born in Wilkinsburg, Pennsylvania, and entered service in Greensburg, Pennsylvania. He was buried in St. Cloud, Florida.

== Medal of Honor citation ==
The President of the United States of America, in the name of Congress, takes pleasure in presenting the Medal of Honor to Corporal Amzi Davis Harmon, United States Army, for extraordinary heroism on 2 April 1865, while serving with Company K, 211th Pennsylvania Infantry, in action at Petersburg, Virginia, for capture of flag.

== See also ==
- List of American Civil War Medal of Honor recipients: G–L
- Third Battle of Petersburg
- 211th Pennsylvania Infantry
