= Derry Township, Mifflin County, Pennsylvania =

Township in Pennsylvania, US

Coordinates: 40°38′00″N 77°29′29″W

- Township
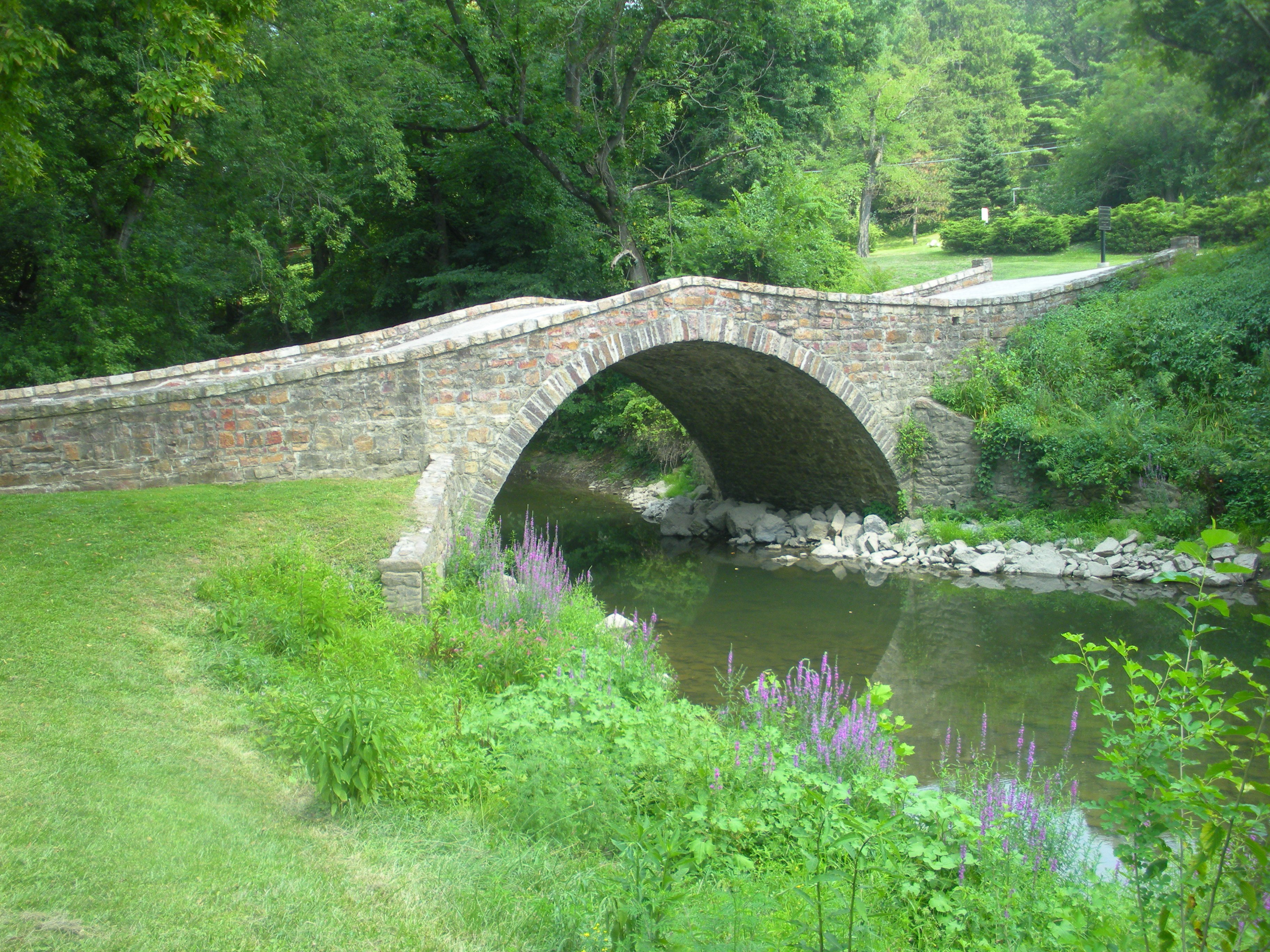
- Jack's Creek bridge, built 1813

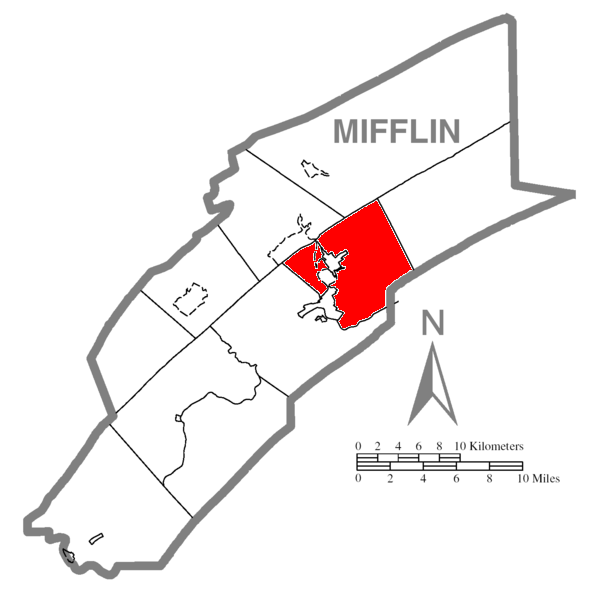
- Map of Mifflin County, Pennsylvania highlighting Derry Township

- Map of Mifflin County, Pennsylvania
- Country: United States
- State: Pennsylvania
- County: Mifflin
- Settled: 1750
- Incorporated: 1766

Government
  - Type: Board of Supervisors
  - Chairman: Ronald E. Napikoski Jr.
  - Vice-chairman: Donald R. Warntz II
  - Supervisor: John T. Sipe

Area
  - Total: 31.00 sq mi (80.28 km^{2})
  - Land: 30.73 sq mi (79.60 km^{2})
  - Water: 0.26 sq mi (0.67 km^{2})

Population (2020)
  - Total: 7,212 ▼
  - Estimate (2022): 7,250
  - Density: 238.1/sq mi (91.92/km^{2})
- Time zone: UTC-5 (Eastern (EST))
  - Summer (DST): UTC-4 (EDT)
- Area code: 717
- FIPS code: 42-087-18944
- Website: Derry Township

Derry Township is a township in Mifflin County, Pennsylvania, United States. The population was 7,212 at the 2020 census.

It was named after the city of Derry in Northern Ireland.

== History ==
The Lewistown Armory and Old Hoopes School are listed on the National Register of Historic Places.

== Geography ==
According to the United States Census Bureau, the township has a total area of 31.2 square miles (81 km^{2}), of which 31.1 square miles (81 km^{2}) is land and 0.1 square miles (0.26 km^{2}) (0.32%) is water. It contains the census-designated places of Highland Park, Maitland, and Yeagertown.

== Demographics ==
Historical population
Census	Pop.	Note	%±
2010	7,339		—
2020	7,212		−1.7%
2022 (est.)	7,250		0.5%
U.S. Decennial Census

As of the census of 2000, there were 7,256 people, 2,946 households, and 2,106 families residing in the township. The population density was 233.3 inhabitants per square mile (90.1/km^{2}). There were 3,161 housing units at an average density of 101.6 per square mile (39.2/km^{2}). The racial makeup of the township was 98.35% White, 0.30% African American, 0.01% Native American, 0.63% Asian, 0.25% from other races, and 0.45% from two or more races. Hispanic or Latino of any race were 0.59% of the population.

There were 2,946 households, out of which 27.8% had children under the age of 18 living with them, 60.1% were married couples living together, 8.0% had a female householder with no husband present, and 28.5% were non-families. 24.4% of all households were made up of individuals, and 13.9% had someone living alone who was 65 years of age or older. The average household size was 2.42 and the average family size was 2.86.

In the township the population was spread out, with 21.8% under the age of 18, 6.0% from 18 to 24, 26.6% from 25 to 44, 26.8% from 45 to 64, and 18.8% who were 65 years of age or older. The median age was 42 years. For every 100 females there were 92.2 males. For every 100 females age 18 and over, there were 88.5 males.

The median income for a household in the township was $34,712, and the median income for a family was $41,353. Males had a median income of $33,194 versus $25,783 for females. The per capita income for the township was $18,234. About 5.6% of families and 8.3% of the population were below the poverty line, including 9.9% of those under age 18 and 8.8% of those age 65 or over.
