= Old Hoopes School =

- U.S. National Register of Historic Places
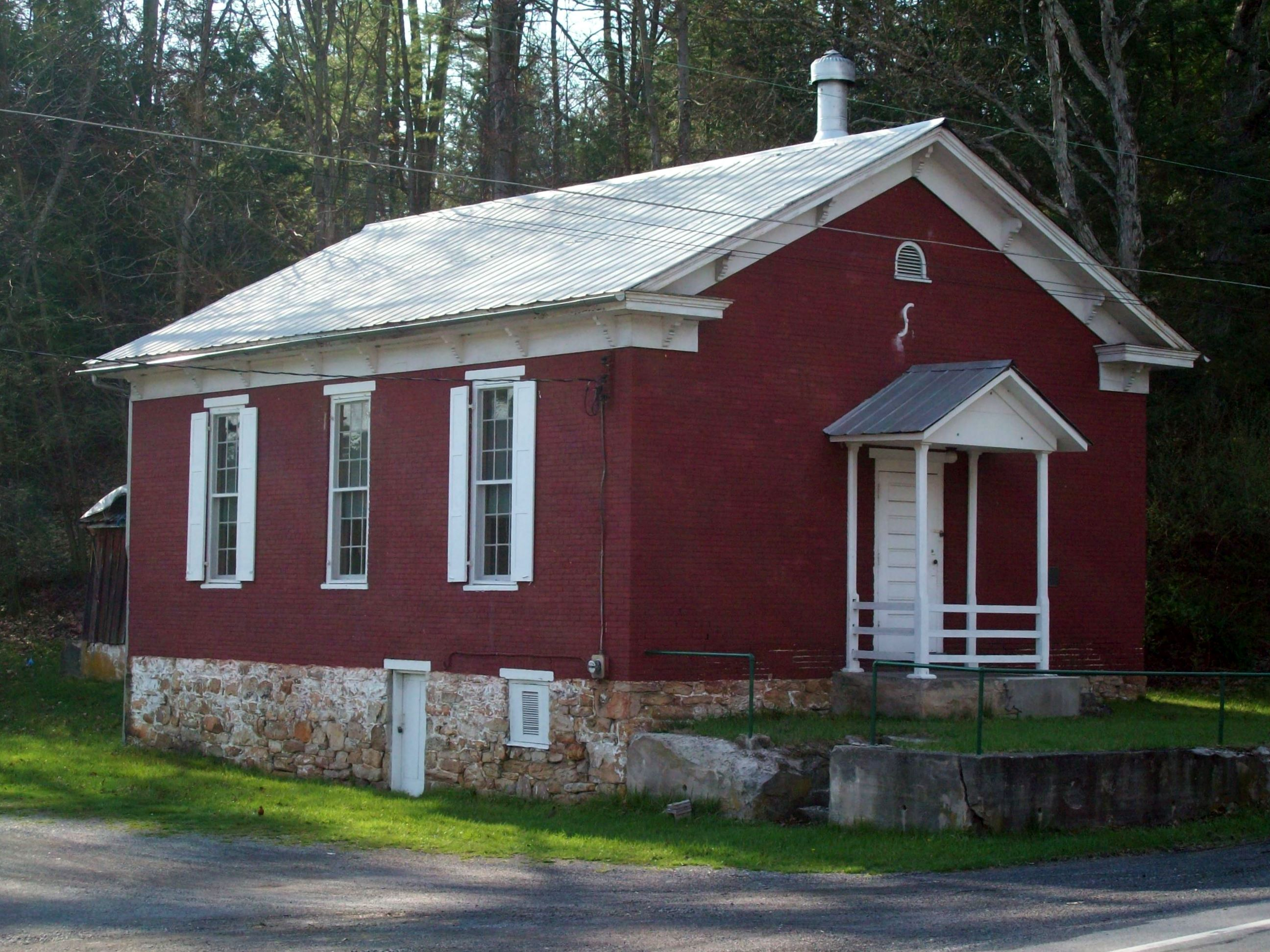
- Old Hoopes School, April 2010

- Location within Pennsylvania Location within the United States
- Location: Northeast of Lewistown, Derry Township, Pennsylvania
- Coordinates: 40°38′25″N 77°30′23″W
- Area: 0.2 acres (0.081 ha)
- Built: c. 1873
- NRHP reference No.: 78002431
- Added to NRHP: December 20, 1978

Old Hoopes School is a historic one-room school building located in Derry Township, Mifflin County, Pennsylvania. It was built about 1873 and is a 1 1/2-story brick building with a cobblestone foundation and a gable roof. It measures three bays by one bay.

It was added to the National Register of Historic Places in 1978.
