= Cradles to Crayons =

American non-profit organization

- Formation: 2002
- Founded: 2002
- Founder: Lynn Margherio
- Type: nonprofit
- Purpose: Child clothing insecurity in the United States
- Headquarters: Boston, MA
- Location: Boston, Massachusetts, Philadelphia, Pennsylvania, Chicago, Illinois
- Region served: Massachusetts, Chicagoland, Greater Philadelphia
- CEO: Christine Morin
- Website: www.cradlestocrayons.org

Cradles to Crayons (C2C) is an American non-profit organization that provides free clothes and other basic needs such as shoes, diapers, coats, and backpacks with school supplies to children living in homeless, poverty, and low-income situations. Cradles to Crayons began with its first Giving Factory warehouse in Quincy, Massachusetts, in 2002. Cradles to Crayons expanded to Philadelphia, Pennsylvania, in 2006 and Chicago, Illinois, in 2016. Cradles to Crayons partners with corporations, community groups, service organizations, media outlets, sports teams, and other organizations in Chicagoland, Greater Philadelphia, and Massachusetts. Supporters donate clothing and essential items at donation boxes, at local community collection drives, or onsite at the Giving Factories. Volunteers then quality check, sort and package the donations which Cradles to Crayons provides to service partners who deliver them to the hands of children and families.

The organization has EIN 04-3584367 as a 501(c)(3) Public Charity; in 2025, it claimed $48,850,142 in total revenue and $33,139,298 in total assets.

== History ==
Cradles to Crayons was conceived by Lynn Margherio when she was spending time with her young niece. She realized that children grow very quickly, leaving new and nearly new clothing and other children’s essentials unused. Interested in redistributing viable resources like free kids clothes and free baby clothes to meet community need, she tested a model to process and redistributed items and make them accessible to children and families. She founded Cradles to Crayons as a nonprofit organization and it officially opened its doors in Quincy, Massachusetts, in 2002. C2C provided free clothing and other essentials to 2,000 children in its first year and later expanded physical locations, warehouses called The Giving Factory to Philadelphia, Pennsylvania and Chicago, Illinois. Through the development of an online clothing donation platform, Giving Factory Direct also served children in NYC and San Francisco from 2021-2025. The organization has Cradles to Crayons drop off locations in Massachusetts, Pennsylvania, and Illinois. The new and gently used children's clothing donations go to support families and children in need. In 2020, they purchased a building and relocated their Massachusetts Giving Factory warehouse in Brighton, MA to a larger "forever home" in Newton, MA. Cradles to Crayons claims its goal is "making it convenient to turn compassion into action."

== Clothing Distribution ==
=== The Giving Factory ===
The Giving Factory brings in corporate, school, and neighborhood volunteers, ages 5 and older, who sort Cradles to Crayons donations based on the needs of orders collected from children service partners. These orders include clothing & essential items requested by quantity, size, and age.

=== Giving Factory Direct ===
From 2021-2025, Cradles to Crayons Giving Factory Direct was a direct clothing donation program to support children facing clothing insecurity. Individual, family, and corporate donors from across the United States shipped their clothing donation to a specific child with specific needs. Online donors were matched with children who needed clothing and were given a packing list to ship to the child they'd been paired with.

== Impact ==
Since 2002, Cradles to Crayons has distributed more 5 million packages of clothing and essentials to children and families living at 200% of the Federal Poverty Line and below—including unhoused families and those in transition from domestic violence or other emergency situations— in Chicagoland, Greater Philadelphia, Massachusetts, NYC, and San Francisco. In FY23, Cradles to Crayons distributed 803,071 packages of essentials, including 152,888 packages of clothing and shoes, 8,589,750 diapers, 101,715 winter coats and accessories, 184,759 backpacks and supplies. In 2023 Cradles to Crayons engaged more than 112,994 volunteers in the Giving Factory warehouses.

== Locations ==
=== Boston ===
Cradles to Crayons was founded in the Boston area in 2002. In 2011, Cradles to Crayons Boston was recognized with the "Partnership of the Year" award from the Boston Business Journal for their work with Staples, and received the Neighborhood Builder Award from Bank of America. In that same year, C2C was chosen by Massachusetts Governor, Deval Patrick, to host his inaugural Project 351 event, a day of public service with 8th Grade representatives from each of Massachusetts' 351 cities and towns.. Deval Patrick led a day of community service in the warehouse with hundreds of students from Massachusetts. Cradles to Crayons has partnered with Project 351 on their Spring Service since 2011, bringing in thousands of pounds of donated clothing from across Massachusetts in support of C2C’s Spring Greening initiative.

=== Philadelphia ===
Cradles to Crayons Philadelphia throws annual campaigns like their "Ready for School" initiative. This campaign urges individuals and businesses in Philadelphia to help provide resources to local homeless children. The money donated towards this campaign is used to distribute new "Kidpacks", which are filled with school supplies.

=== Chicago ===
In October 2016, Cradles to Crayons opened its Chicago location in a 20,000-square-foot warehouse facility titled the Giving Factory. In 2022, they moved to a larger warehouse in the North Center neighborhood of Chicago. The Cradles To Crayons Chicago Giving Factory warehouse is similar to the size of the organization's other locations in Boston, Massachusetts, and Philadelphia, Pennsylvania. Several volunteers within the Chicago community welcomed Cradles to Crayons by contributing to the organization's goal of receiving 16,000 donations.

== Services and programs ==
Packages are brought directly to the families free of charge, through partnerships with hundreds of social service partner agencies such as Catholic Charities, The Home for Little Wanderers, and Horizons for Homeless Children.

Cradles to Crayons' signature program, Everyday Essentials, operates without interruption throughout the year; programs are focused with seasonal initiatives. Ready for School provides children with the materials they need for school. Gear Up for Winter supplies kids with the cold weather gear.

== Events ==
=== 2018 ===
In April 2018, in partnership with Comcast and from assistance from hundreds of volunteers, Cradles for Crayons packaged more than 7,500 hygiene kits for children across Chicago. That same month, CTC also partnered with Metropolitan Family Services in their collaboration with Walgreens, Huggies, and former Chicago Cubs catcher David Ross to distribute a $10,000 donation, and 1.5 million diapers to the younger aid receivers. The following month saw CTC partner with television networks NBC 5 and Telemundo along with several Xfinity stores in an effort to gather more donations. Later in August, CTC teamed up with Jordans Furniture by collecting new and like-new clothing and shoes at all store locations and at the Taunton Distribution Center. The total amount of donations were enough to assist more than 3,000 children in need. October saw the nonprofit hold an interactive 21+ event in its factory that showcased daily operations and practices. In December, CTC held an event for volunteers to come into their warehouse on the Northwest side to help meet the increased demand for the holiday season.

=== 2019 ===
In June 2019, Cradles to Crayons teamed up with Jordans Furniture again by collecting new and like-new clothing and shoes at all store locations and at the Taunton Distribution Center. Jordans Furniture donation has helped Cradles to Crayons by collecting enough clothing to provide for 3,000 children. Later in August, Cradles to Crayons held an event in Chicago's Daley plaza to fill 50,000 backpacks with school supplies for homeless or low-income children. In October, twenty locations across Chicago, including the Oak Park Public Library, held that year's annual Gear Up For Winter initiative where gently used coats and other winter clothing items were collected to later be donated.

== Media ==
Cradles to Crayons was reviewed by Charity Navigator, an organization which evaluates the financial health, accountability, and transparency of America’s largest charities. They have been awarded the four-star rating since 2009.

Cradles to Crayons was featured in the December 2011 issue of O, The Oprah Magazine.
