= Ligonier Valley, Pennsylvania =

Valley in the United States

Coordinates: 40.238°N 79.230°W

Ligonier Valley is a valley in Westmoreland County, Pennsylvania, United States.

== History ==
Around 1727 the first Native American settlement was made in the Ligonier Valley, near the confluence of Mill Creek and Loyalhanna Creek. The village was still relatively new when the first traders came in 1732.

In the next quarter-century the great struggle for mid-America developed between the English and the French. The showdown came in what is now known as the French and Indian War. In 1758 the English mounted a full-scale campaign. Gen. John Forbes commanded the expedition which drove through the woods and mountains of Pennsylvania, setting up a series of forts to strengthen his hand for the final blow: the attack on Fort Duquesne at the juncture of the Monongahela and Allegheny Rivers. One of the forts was named for the commander-in-chief of the British Army, Field Marshal Lord John Ligonier.

Alarmed at the approach of the British, the French and their Indian allies decided that the best defense was a good offense. On October 12, 1758, they attacked Fort Ligonier—approaching from the southwest. There were about 1,200 French soldiers and only a few hundred Indians. (Many of the Indians had returned home to prepare for the approaching winter.)

The French and Indians who attacked Fort Ligonier were under the command of DeVitri. They began firing at 11:00 am and the battle lasted until 3:00 pm After a spirited encounter, the French and Indians were beaten off with a heavy loss and they fled back to Duquesne. The British troops, under Gen. Forbes and Col. Washington, pressed on after the Ligonier victory; when they arrived at Duquesne, they found the fort afire. The victory at Ligonier was the turning point for the British. They established their own fort, named it for Prime Minister William Pitt, thus giving birth to the city of Pittsburgh.

Fort Ligonier functioned for a few more years. Arrangements were made with Gen. Arthur St. Clair of the British Army, to serve as caretaker of the facility since he lived only a short distance away. Increasing ferocious Indian attacks during the American Revolution led to the construction of a second fort in 1777 (sometimes known as Fort Preservation). It was located somewhat east of the original fort and served as a refuge for the settlers. By the end of the Revolution, it had outlived its usefulness and was allowed to fall into disrepair. A few years later it disappeared altogether.
