= 205th Pennsylvania Infantry Regiment =

Union Army infantry regiment

205th Pennsylvania Volunteer Infantry
- Pennsylvania flag
- Active: September 2, 1864 – June 2, 1865
- Country: United States
- Allegiance: Union
- Branch: Union Army
- Type: Infantry
- Size: Regiment
- Engagements: American Civil War: Siege of Petersburg; Battle of Fort Stedman; Third Battle of Petersburg

Commanders
- Notable commanders: Col. Joseph A. Mathews

The 205th Pennsylvania Infantry was an infantry regiment of the Union Army during the American Civil War. It was raised during the final war year in response to President Lincoln's call for 500,000 volunteers. The regiment joined the IX Corps to counter General Lee's final offensive thrust at Ford Stedman and attacked to break through the Petersburg defenses one week before his final surrender at Appomattox. It participated in the Grand Review of the Armies and was mustered out in June 1865.

== Organization ==
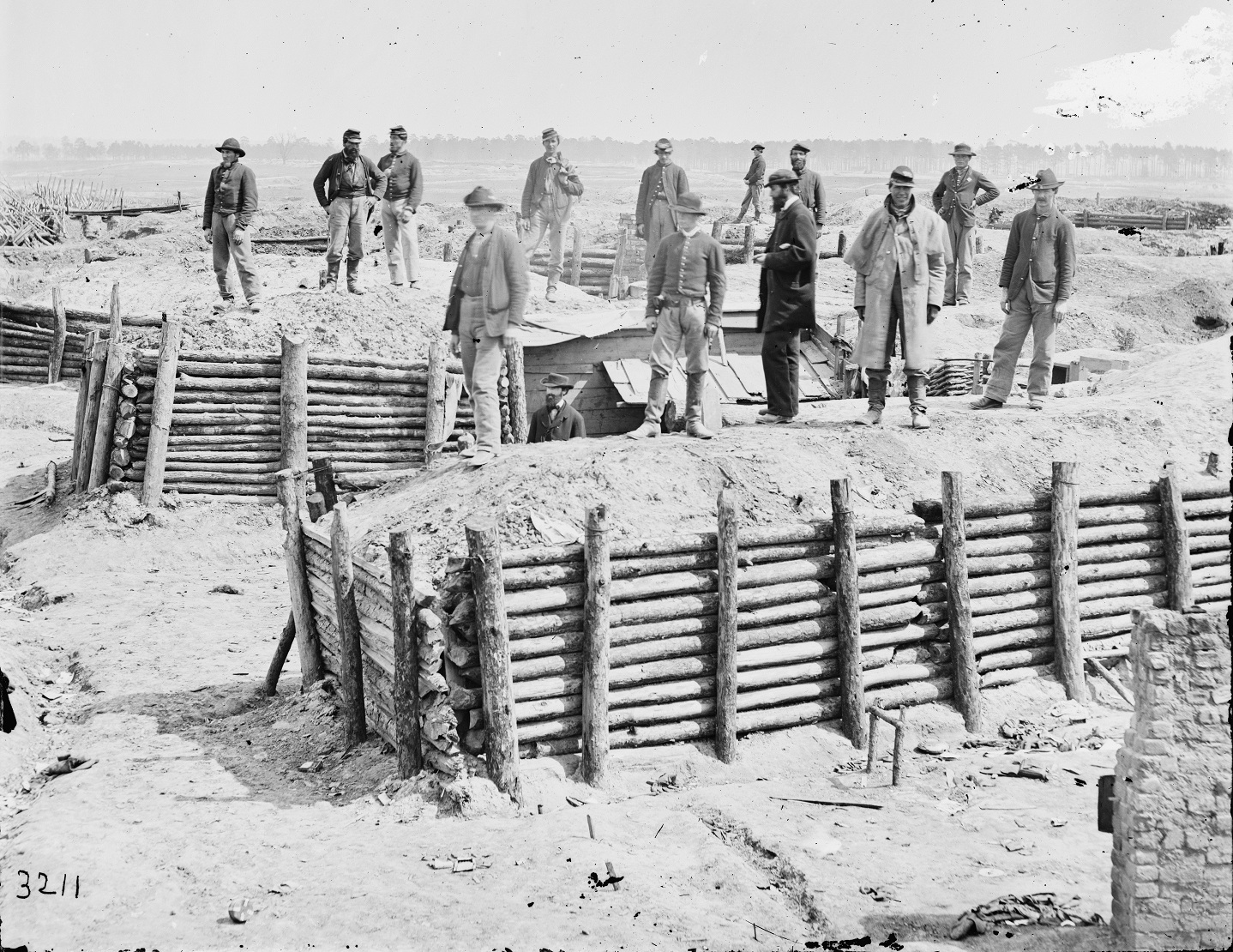
Breastworks of the Confederate Fort Mahone, a.k.a. "Fort Damnation," are occupied April 3, 1865.

The 205th Pennsylvania was recruited during the late summer of 1864 in central Pennsylvania and mustered in at Camp Curtin in Harrisburg on September 2, 1864. Joseph Ard Mathews was selected to be Colonel, William F. Walter Lieutenant Colonel, and B. Mortimer Morrow Major. Many of the officers and men, including all three field officers, had previously fought in the war.

Company	County of Recruitment	Earliest Captain
A	Blair	George C. Gwinner
B	Berks	Joseph G. Holmes
C	Blair	Louis D. Spiece
D	Huntingdon	Thomas B. Reed
E	Berks	William F. Walter
F	Mifflin	Jacob F. Hamaker
G	Blair, Dauphin and Franklin	Erasmus D. Wilts
H	Berks	Franklin Schmehl
I	Blair	Ira R. Shipley
K	Mifflin	F. B. McClenahen

== Petersburg Campaign ==
The regiment was sent to the siege lines at Petersburg, Virginia, first as part of the Army of the James, and then reassigned to the Army of the Potomac. Five other Pennsylvania regiments with the 205th comprised a provisional brigade of the IX Corps and were commanded by Brigadier General John F. Hartranft. Two months later the brigade was redesignated as the Corps' Third Division, and Hartranft was promoted to its command. The 205th became part of the 2nd Brigade, commanded by Mathews, along with the 207th and 211th Pennsylvania. The new troops of the Third Division attacked the veterans of Confederate General John B. Gordon twice within a span of eight days.

=== Battle of Fort Stedman ===
The pre-dawn and early morning phases of the final offensive thrust of the Army of Northern Virginia had broken the Union line at Fort Stedman, capturing the Fort and several adjacent batteries. Arriving on the field and quickly recognizing the severity of the situation, General Hartranft organized and executed a highly effective counter-attack which reversed the outcome of the Battle.

For their part in the Battle of Fort Stedman on March 25, 1865, the division was commended for good conduct in their first major engagement by the corps commander, Major General John G. Parke. The 205th captured several prisoners and one battle flag, losing only ten wounded.

=== Petersburg Breakthrough ===
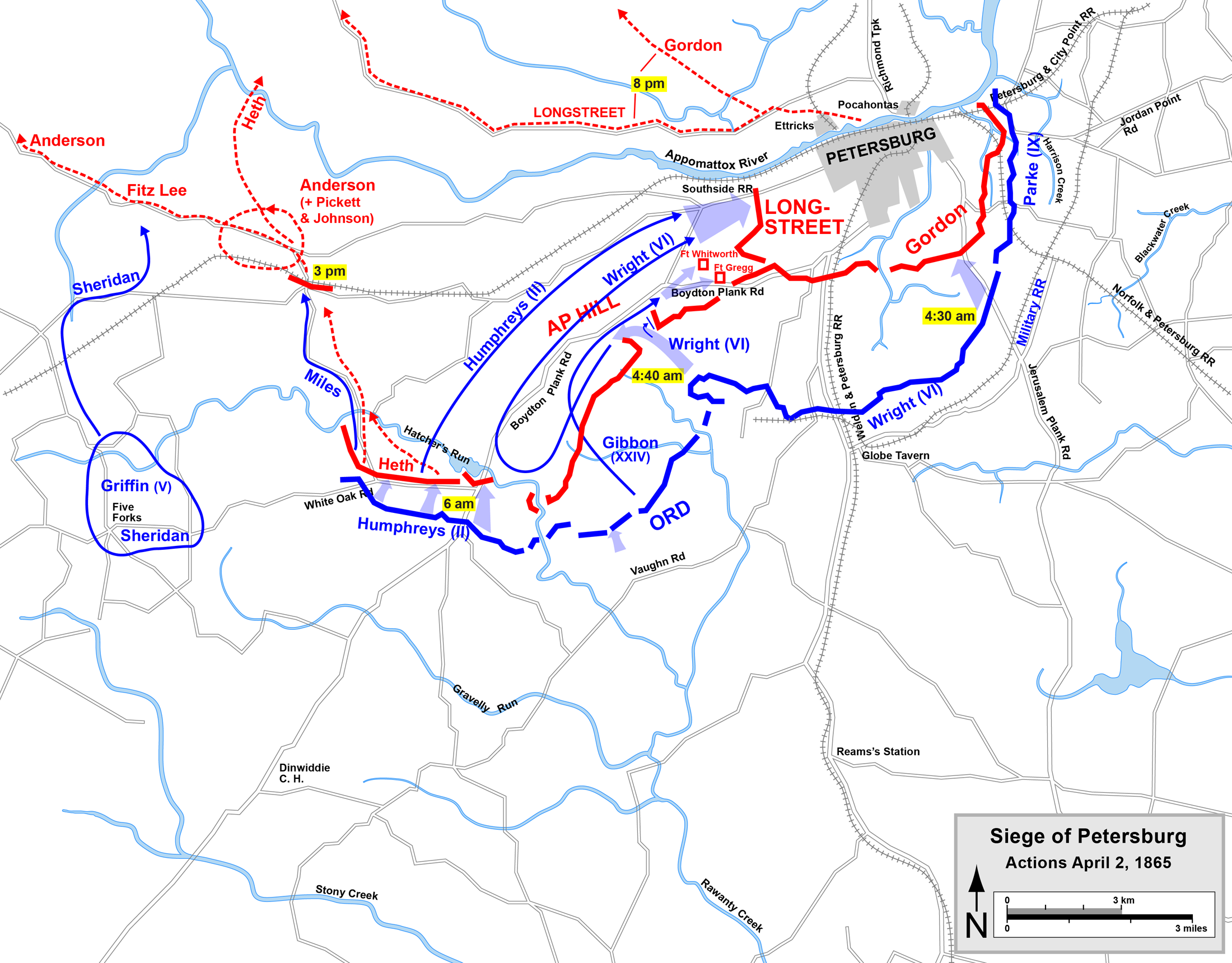
Using the Jerusalem Plank Road to guide them, the 205th Pennsylvania stepped off in the center column of three which attacked Fort Mahone and adjacent batteries during the pre-dawn hours of April 2.

General Grant's primary plan for the morning of April 2, 1865, was to push forward his own left flank and to break General Lee's right flank. Aware of the possibility for troop shifting from far distant points to resist his primary assault, Grant found it necessary to order a simultaneous assault on Lee's center at Fort Mahone although the Confederate fortifications were considered impregnable.

During the breakthrough at Petersburg, the 205th assaulted Battery 30, capturing more prisoners and another battle flag. Morrow was wounded during the attack and Captain Holmes took command of the regiment.

== Appomattox Campaign ==
During the Appomattox Campaign, the 205th repaired the South Side Railroad as far as Burkesville. After the Confederate surrender at Appomattox Court House, the regiment was moved to City Point, Virginia, and then to Alexandria, Virginia. It participated in the Grand Review of the Armies in Washington, D.C., on May 23 and was mustered out on June 2.

== Casualties ==
- Killed and died of wounds: 3 officers, 37 enlisted men
- Wounded: 5 officers, 91 enlisted men
- Captured or missing: 0 officers, 5 enlisted men
- Died of disease: 0 officers, 17 enlisted men
- Total: 8 officers, 150 enlisted men
