= Indian Valley High School (Pennsylvania) =

High school in Pennsylvania, United States

Coordinates: 40.62300°N 77.56644°W

- Lewistown, Pennsylvania; United States

Information
- Closed: 2011
- Mascot: Warrior
- Website: www.indianvalleywarriors.com

Indian Valley High School was a high school in Lewistown, Pennsylvania. It administered up to 1000 students. Its mascot was the Indian Valley Warrior. After districtwide restructuring the school was converted into an 8-9 junior high in 2011.
