= Lewistown, Pennsylvania =

Borough in Pennsylvania, US

- Borough
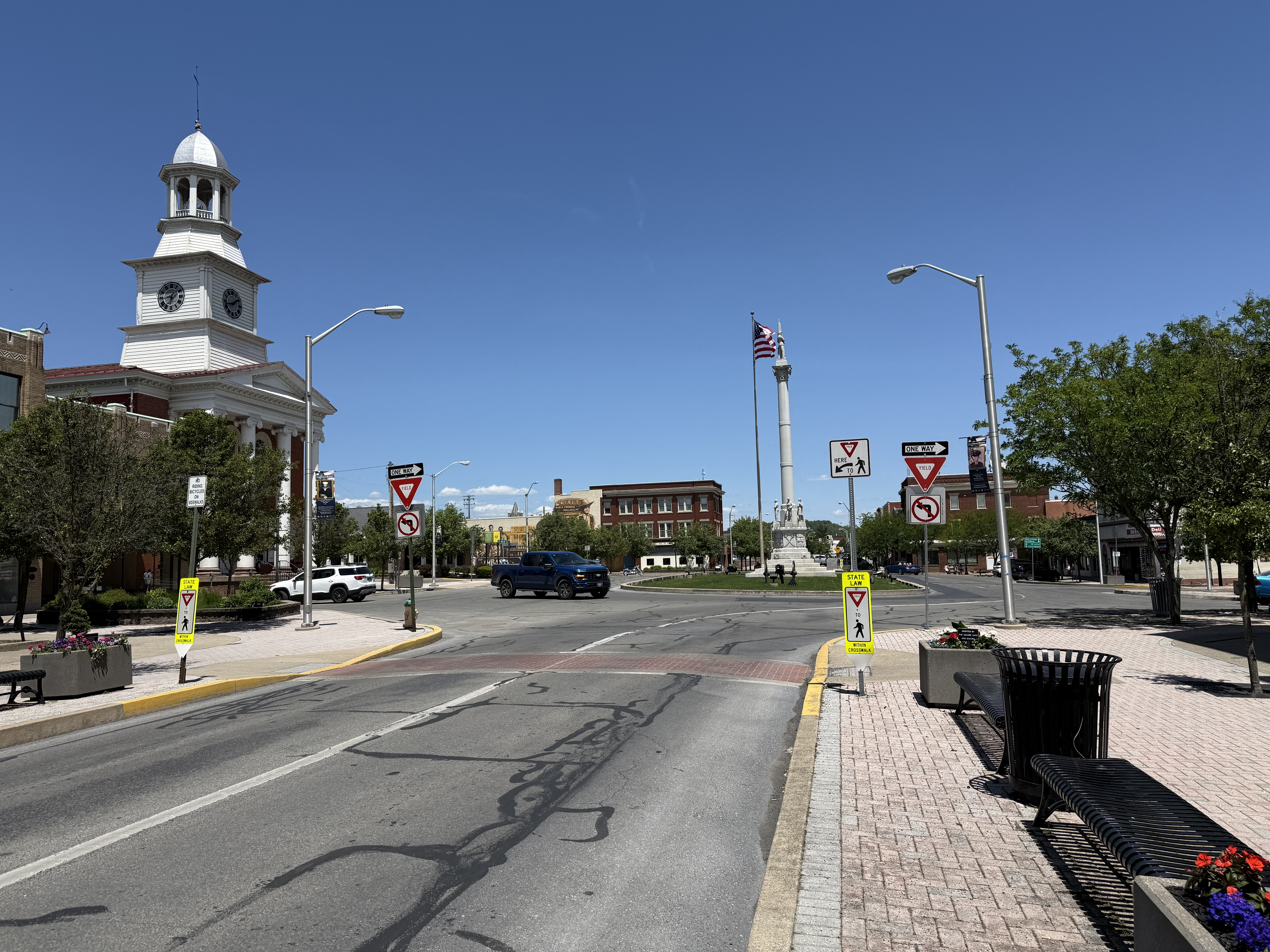
- Monument Square in Lewistown

- Seal

- Location of Lewistown in Mifflin County, Pennsylvania

- Location within Pennsylvania Location within the United States
- Coordinates: 40°35′51″N 77°34′24″W
- Country: United States
- State: Pennsylvania
- County: Mifflin
- Settled: 1790
- Incorporated: 1795

Government
  - Type: Borough Council
  - Mayor: Deborah Bargo
  - Council President: Larry Searer
  - Council Vice President: Jim Steele

Area
  - Total: 2.05 sq mi (5.31 km^{2})
  - Land: 2.03 sq mi (5.26 km^{2})
  - Water: 0.019 sq mi (0.05 km^{2})
- Elevation: 520 ft (160 m)

Population (2020)
  - Total: 8,579
  - Density: 4,225.4/sq mi (1,631.44/km^{2})
- Time zone: UTC-5 (Eastern (EST))
  - Summer (DST): UTC-4 (EDT)
- ZIP Code: 17044
- Area codes: 717 and 223
- FIPS code: 42-43000
- School district: Mifflin County School District
- Website: lewistownborough.com/index.php

Lewistown is a borough in and the county seat of Mifflin County, Pennsylvania, United States. It is the principal city of the Lewistown, PA Micropolitan Statistical Area, which encompasses all of Mifflin County. It lies along the Juniata River, 61 miles (98 km) northwest of Harrisburg.

The number of people living in the borough in 1900 was 4,451; in 1910, 8,166; in 1940, 13,017; and in 2000, 8,998. The population was 8,561 at the 2020 census.

== History ==
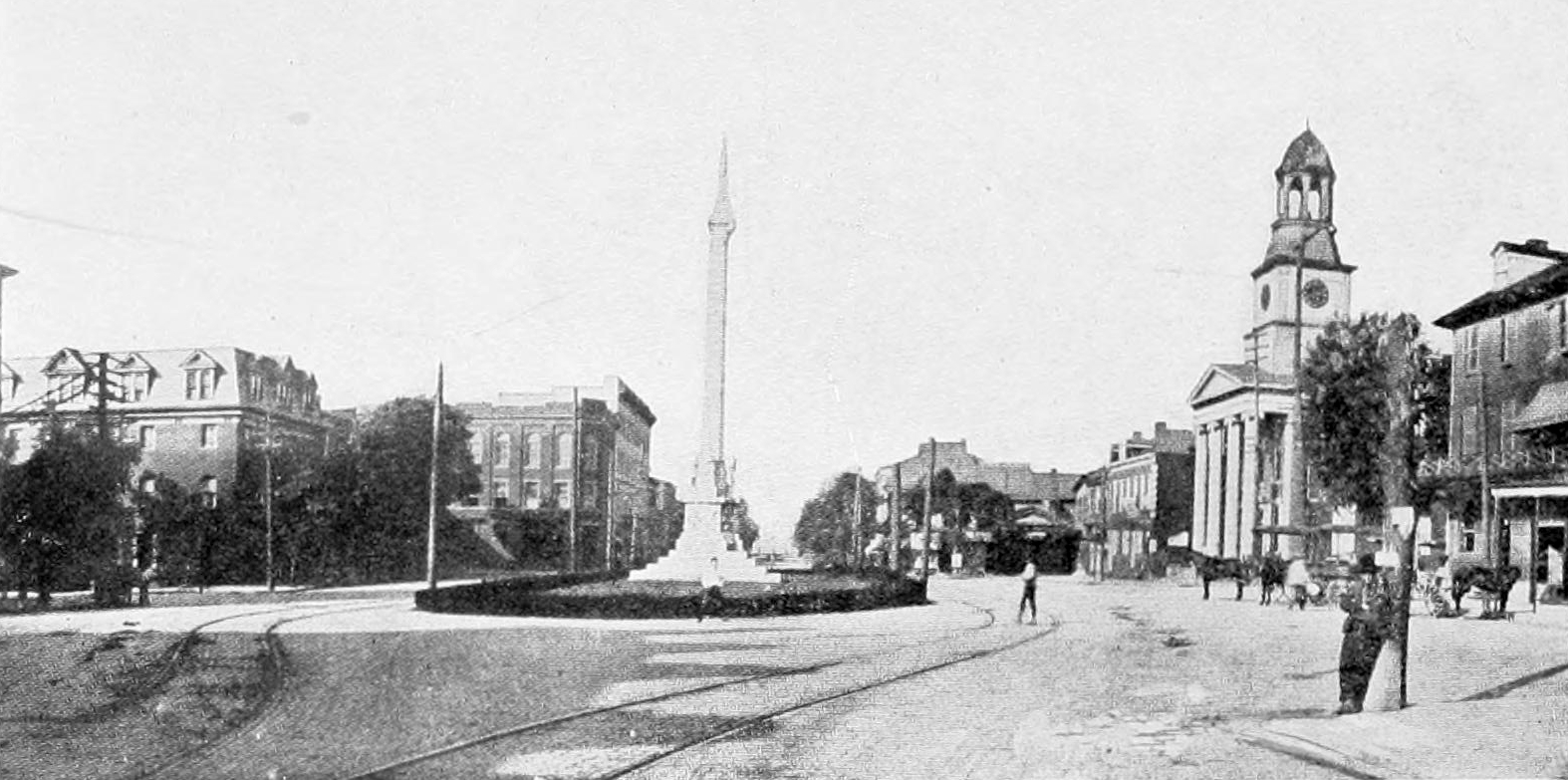
Monument Square in Lewistown in 1913

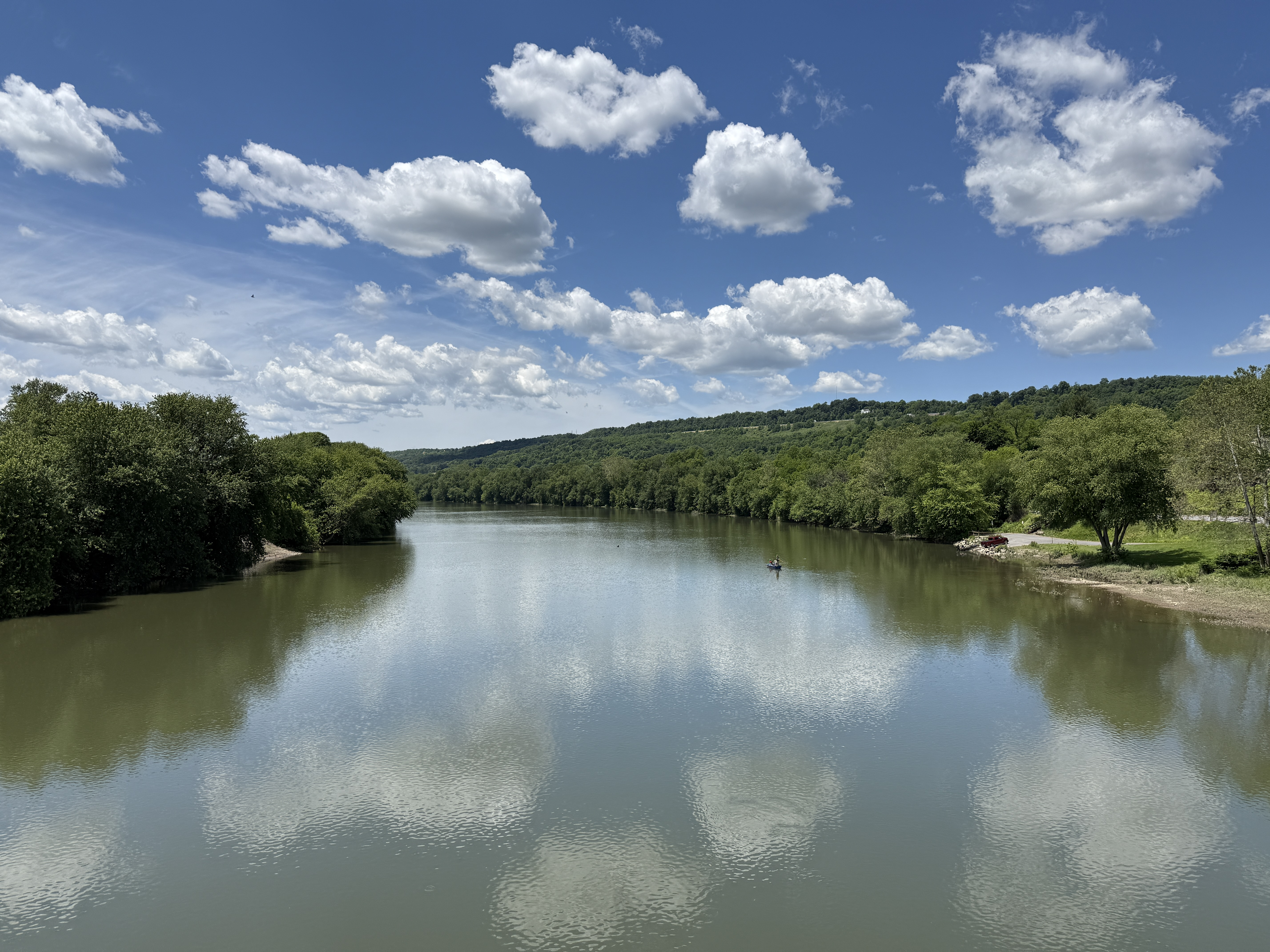
The Juniata River by Lewistown

=== 18th century ===
The borough was incorporated in 1795 and was named for William "Bill" Lewis, a Quaker and a member of the state legislature. He gained designation of the borough, which was known then as the Village of Ohesson, as the county seat of Mifflin County.

=== 19th century ===
During the late 19th century, Mifflin County became the crossroads of the Commonwealth. Located near the geographic center of the state, the area became a hub for traffic moving in every direction. Early roads crisscrossed the region, but it was the construction of the Pennsylvania Canal and the railroads that followed that gave stimulus to Mifflin County as an economic force in the state.

Lewistown, as the major city in Mifflin County, saw its economy expand dramatically as entrepreneurs launched companies to construct canal boats or build inns offering lodging for travelers and workers.

At its zenith, Mifflin County was one of the busiest centers for cargo and passenger traffic in the United States. But with the demise of the canal system, Mifflin County eventually lost its place as a major transportation hub.

On April 16, 1861, as the American Civil War broke out, Lewistown sent its Logan Guards, a militia group formed in 1858, to defend the national capital of Washington, D.C. They were one of five companies, all recruited in Pennsylvania, to share the honor of being the first U.S. troops sent to the capital. Monument Square, situated at the intersection of Main and Market Streets in Lewistown, serves as a memorial to these men.

=== 20th century ===
Lewistown lost its role as a major transportation hub, but still boasted a strong industrial economy into the 1970s, when the county's industries began a slow decline.

The effects of Hurricane Agnes in June 1972 crippled the local economy. On June 19, Hurricane Agnes made initial landfall along the Florida Panhandle as a weak Category 1 Hurricane. Agnes proceeded through Georgia, South Carolina and North Carolina before moving over the Atlantic off the North Carolina coast on June 21.

After regaining strength over the Atlantic, the storm made landfall again over southeastern New York on June 22 and moved westward in an arc over southern New York into north-central Pennsylvania. Hurricane Agnes became nearly stationary over Pennsylvania by morning of June 23, but was soon absorbed by a low-pressure system that slowly drifted northeastward from Pennsylvania into New York.

Rainfall from the storm over the Mid-Atlantic region ranged from 2 to 3 inches (51 to 76 mm) in the extreme upper basins of the Potomac and North Branch Susquehanna Rivers to 18 inches (460 mm) near Shamokin, Pennsylvania, in the Main Stem Susquehanna River basin. An average of 6 to 10 inches (150 to 250 mm) of rain fell over the Mid-Atlantic region. The soil, already well watered by spring rains, could not absorb so much water so quickly.

While flooding from the Juniata River was somewhat controlled due to a dam at Raystown Lake, 44 miles (71 km) west of Lewistown, the county suffered extensive flooding from the river and major streams. This resulted in the permanent closure of many businesses along the river.

Most notably, the flood submerged much of the American Viscose Corporation plant, then a division of FMC Corporation. The facility, located on the banks of the Juniata River across from Lewistown proper, manufactured rayon fiber (primarily for rayon-belted automobile tires), polyester, and Avistrap.

FMC was one of two major employers in the area at the time, the other being the Standard Steel Works. The Viscose plant was only marginally profitable before the storm, and the cost to reopen was prohibitive. The demand for rayon fabric for trendy clothing shot upward a few years later. Rayon production, and with it, thousands of good-paying jobs, moved to another FMC plant in Front Royal, Virginia. The Lewistown polyester plant reopened, but it rehired only a fraction of the previous workforce. The site eventually became the Mifflin County Industrial Plaza and a variety of businesses have come and gone since then.

In the wake of the failure of Lewistown's industry, a long period of decline began. The 1990s saw the loss of several plants, including Masland and Lear, and Standard Steel filing for reorganization bankruptcy.

=== 21st century ===
The early 2000s saw the loss of Scotty's Fashions, Mann Edge Tool, Overhead Door shuttering its sectional division, and Ford New Holland shuttering its Belleville plant. This led to the related closing of the Belleville Foundry.

In 2011, Standard Steel merged with Japanese company Sumitomo Industries and is now known as Nippon Steel. This merger effectively saved the jobs of 500 union laborers as well as many others in the area. First Quality, an adult incontinence products manufacturer, opened a facility in Lewistown that employs approximately 400 people. Geisinger purchased Lewistown Hospital in 2013 and expanded services, including a helicopter pad, the Geisinger LIFE program, and a new clinic in nearby Reedsville.

In the 2020s, Lewistown has seen growth in new small businesses by young entrepreneurs, including restaurants and retail. The construction of an enhanced highway system between Lewistown and State College was completed in 2020 and better connects the two communities.

== Geography ==
According to the United States Census Bureau, the borough has a total area of 2.0 square miles (5.2 km^{2}), all land. The town's borders lie along the Juniata River.

=== Climate ===
Climate data for Lewistown, Pennsylvania (1991–2020 normals, extremes 1938–present)
Month	Jan	Feb	Mar	Apr	May	Jun	Jul	Aug	Sep	Oct	Nov	Dec	Year
Record high °F (°C)	72 (22)	78 (26)	87 (31)	94 (34)	97 (36)	102 (39)	106 (41)	103 (39)	103 (39)	95 (35)	85 (29)	75 (24)	106 (41)
Mean maximum °F (°C)	58.4 (14.7)	61.2 (16.2)	72.4 (22.4)	84.1 (28.9)	89.2 (31.8)	92.0 (33.3)	94.5 (34.7)	92.7 (33.7)	89.7 (32.1)	81.8 (27.7)	72.1 (22.3)	60.3 (15.7)	96.0 (35.6)
Mean daily maximum °F (°C)	37.0 (2.8)	40.4 (4.7)	49.4 (9.7)	62.6 (17.0)	72.8 (22.7)	80.7 (27.1)	85.3 (29.6)	83.6 (28.7)	76.8 (24.9)	65.0 (18.3)	52.6 (11.4)	41.4 (5.2)	62.3 (16.8)
Daily mean °F (°C)	29.0 (−1.7)	31.4 (−0.3)	39.3 (4.1)	50.8 (10.4)	60.9 (16.1)	69.5 (20.8)	74.0 (23.3)	72.4 (22.4)	65.3 (18.5)	53.7 (12.1)	42.8 (6.0)	33.9 (1.1)	51.9 (11.1)
Mean daily minimum °F (°C)	21.0 (−6.1)	22.3 (−5.4)	29.2 (−1.6)	39.0 (3.9)	49.1 (9.5)	58.3 (14.6)	62.6 (17.0)	61.1 (16.2)	53.8 (12.1)	42.5 (5.8)	33.0 (0.6)	26.3 (−3.2)	41.5 (5.3)
Mean minimum °F (°C)	5.5 (−14.7)	8.4 (−13.1)	14.5 (−9.7)	26.7 (−2.9)	36.0 (2.2)	46.2 (7.9)	52.9 (11.6)	51.0 (10.6)	40.7 (4.8)	30.3 (−0.9)	21.3 (−5.9)	13.4 (−10.3)	3.3 (−15.9)
Record low °F (°C)	−17 (−27)	−14 (−26)	3 (−16)	15 (−9)	26 (−3)	32 (0)	41 (5)	38 (3)	28 (−2)	21 (−6)	6 (−14)	−16 (−27)	−17 (−27)
Average precipitation inches (mm)	2.89 (73)	2.31 (59)	3.57 (91)	3.53 (90)	4.16 (106)	3.95 (100)	3.64 (92)	3.61 (92)	4.40 (112)	3.75 (95)	3.06 (78)	3.27 (83)	42.14 (1,070)
Average snowfall inches (cm)	9.1 (23)	6.9 (18)	4.3 (11)	0.2 (0.51)	0.0 (0.0)	0.0 (0.0)	0.0 (0.0)	0.0 (0.0)	0.0 (0.0)	0.1 (0.25)	0.9 (2.3)	4.7 (12)	26.2 (67)
Average precipitation days (≥ 0.01 in)	11.2	9.6	11.3	13.2	14.2	12.1	10.8	10.7	10.2	10.7	9.9	11.2	135.1
Average snowy days (≥ 0.1 in)	3.8	3.5	1.9	0.1	0.0	0.0	0.0	0.0	0.0	0.0	0.4	2.2	11.9
Source: NOAA

=== Water source ===
The source of the borough's city water comes from the Laurel Creek Reservoir, which is located in Seven Mountains going towards State College.

== Demographics ==
Historical population
Census	Pop.	Note	%±
1800	523		—
1810	474		−9.4%
1820	773		63.1%
1830	1,479		91.3%
1840	2,058		39.1%
1850	2,733		32.8%
1860	2,638		−3.5%
1870	2,737		3.8%
1880	3,222		17.7%
1890	3,273		1.6%
1900	4,451		36.0%
1910	8,166		83.5%
1920	9,849		20.6%
1930	13,357		35.6%
1940	13,017		−2.5%
1950	13,894		6.7%
1960	12,640		−9.0%
1970	11,098		−12.2%
1980	9,830		−11.4%
1990	9,341		−5.0%
2000	8,998		−3.7%
2010	8,338		−7.3%
2020	8,579		2.9%
2021 (est.)	8,518	▼	−0.7%

As of the census of 2010, there were 8,338 people, 3,742 households, and 2,030 families residing in the borough. The population density was 4,138.7 inhabitants per square mile (1,598.0/km^{2}). There were 4,345 housing units at an average density of 2,156.7 per square mile (832.7/km^{2}). The racial makeup of the borough was 95.2% White, 1.5% Black or African American, 0.3% Native American, 0.3% Asian, 0.9% from other races, and 1.8% from two or more races. Hispanic or Latino of any race were 3.1% of the population.

There were 3,742 households, out of which 27.7% had children under the age of 18 living with them, 34.8% were married couples living together, 4.8% had a male householder with no wife present, 14.6% had a female householder with no husband present, and 45.8% were non-families. 39.3% of all households were made up of individuals, and 17.3% had someone living alone who was 65 years of age or older. The average household size was 2.21, and the average family size was 2.93.

In the borough, the population was spread out, with 23.3% under the age of 18, 8.6% from 18 to 24, 25.3% from 25 to 44, 26.6% from 45 to 64, and 16.2% who were 65 years of age or older. The median age was 40 years. For every 100 females, there were 89.5 males. For every 100 females age 18 and over, there were 85.3 males.

The median income for a household in the borough was $26,584, and the median income for a family was $38,356. The per capita income for the borough was $16,447. About 22.8% of families and 27.4% of the population were below the poverty line, including 47.0% of those under age 18 and 13.6% of those age 65 or over.

== Notable people ==
- Jean Acker, actress
- Viola Alberti, actress
- Ralph Baker, professional American football player
- Carl Barger, attorney and baseball executive
- Frances McEwen Belford, "mother of the Lincoln Highway"
- John Brown, member of the U.S. House of Representatives from Pennsylvania
- Joseph Campanella, actor
- Bob Cupp, golf course designer
- Kelly Harper, recording artist and singer-songwriter
- Joseph Henderson, member of the U.S. House of Representatives from Pennsylvania
- Trent Hidlay, collegiate and freestyle wrestler
- Laura Johns, suffragist, journalist
- Julia Kasdorf, poet
- John Lilley, U.S. Medal of Honor recipient for gallantry during the American Civil War
- El McMeen, attorney and acoustic steel-string fingerstyle guitarist
- Carolyn Meyer, author of novels for children and young adults
- LeRoy Millette, senior justice of the Supreme Court of Virginia
- Jack Womer, decorated World War II veteran

== Historical buildings in the Lewistown Borough ==
The Embassy Theatre, McCoy House, Mifflin County Courthouse, Montgomery Ward Building, and Wollner Building are listed on the National Register of Historic Places.

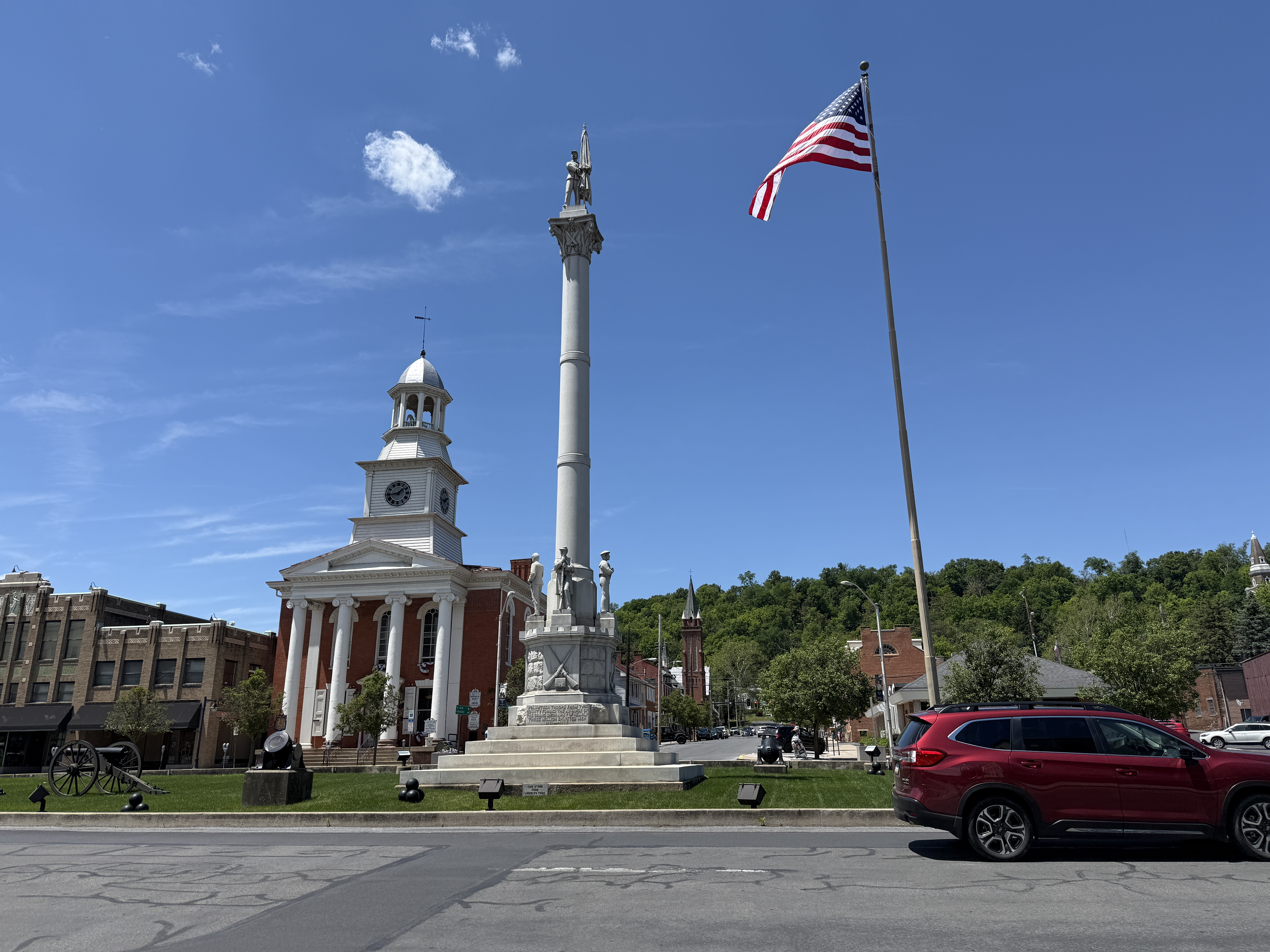
Mifflin County Courthouse and Monument Square

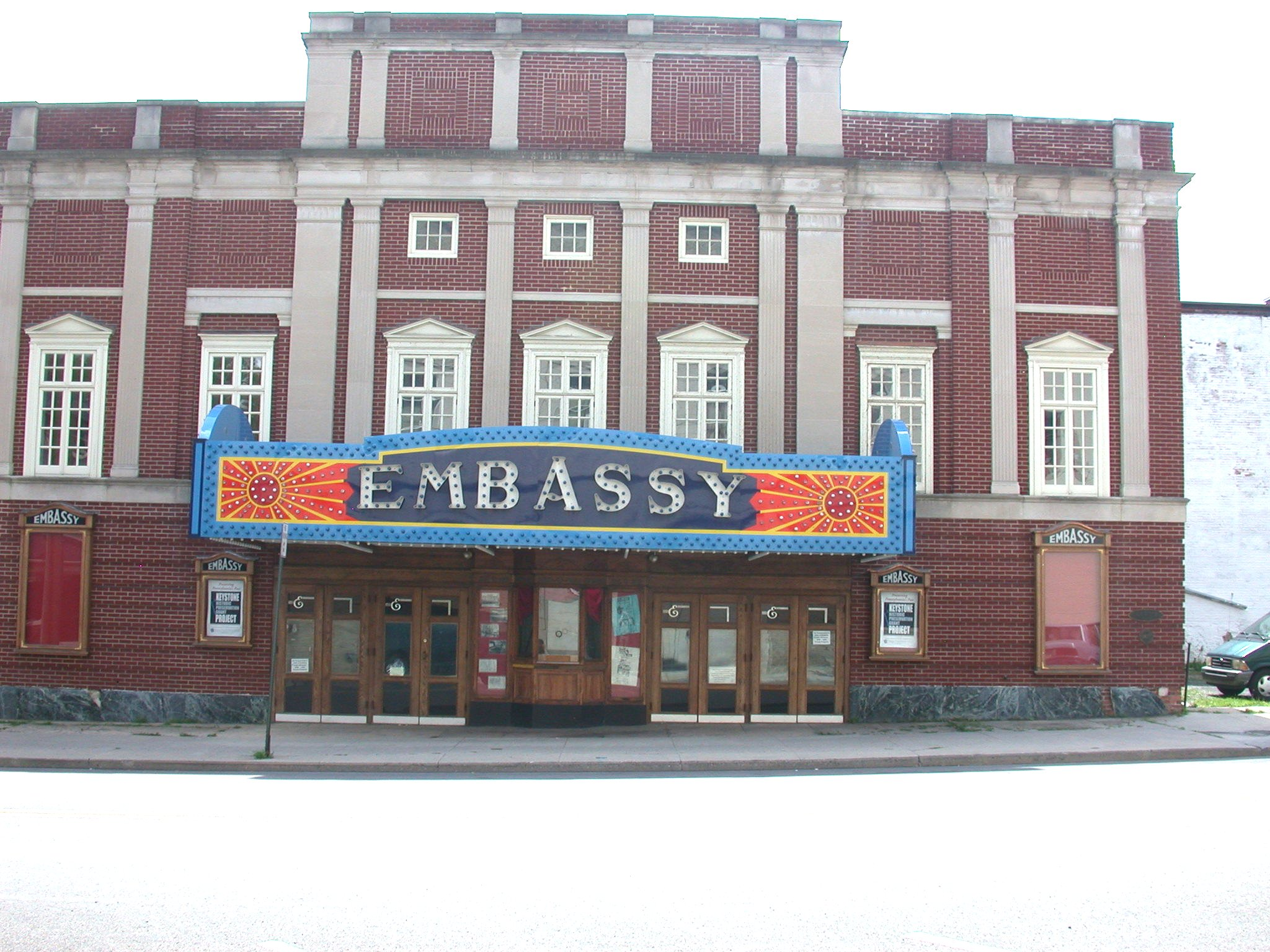
The Historic Embassy Theatre

Hotel Lewistown (now Ansel Apartments)

== Transportation ==
- Lewistown (Amtrak station)
- Greyhound
- Fullington Trailways

== Media ==
=== Newspapers ===
- Lewistown Sentinel

=== Television stations ===
- WHTM 27 Harrisburg (27.1 ABC, 27.2 ION, 27.3 GetTV, 27.4 Laff)
- WPMT 43 York (43.1 FOX, 43.2 AntennaTV)
- WHP 21 Harrisburg (21.1 CBS, 21.2 MyNetworkTV, 21.3 CW)
- WGAL 8 Lancaster (8.1 NBC, 8.2 MeTV)
- WJAC 6 Johnstown (6.1 NBC, 6.2 Charge!, 6.3 Comet, 6.4 CW)
- WTAJ 10 Altoona (10.1 CBS, 10.2 Escape, 10.3 Laff, 10.4 Grit)
- WHVL 29 State College (29.1 MyNetworkTV, 29.2 Buzzr)

=== Radio stations ===
FM stations
Call letters	Frequency	Format	Location	Owner
WRYV	88.7	Christian Contemporary	Milroy	Invisible Allies
WTLR	89.9	Religious	State College	Central Pennsylvania Christian Institute
WJRC	90.9	Christian Contemporary	Lewistown	Salt and Light Media Ministries, Inc.
WIBF	92.5	Country	Mexico	Seven Mountains Media (Kristin Cantrell)
WBUS	93.7	Classic Rock	Boalsburg	Forever Broadcasting
WQKX	94.1	CHR	Sunbury	Sunbury Broadcasting Corporation
WMRF	95.7	Hot AC	Lewistown	Seven Mountains Media (Kristin Cantrell)
WVNW	96.7	Country	Burnham	WVNW, Inc.
WFGY	98.1	Country	Altoona	Forever Broadcasting
WMAJ	99.5	Hot AC	Centre Hall	Seven Mountains Media (Kristin Cantrell)
W262DO	100.3	Light AC	Lewistown	WVNW, Inc.
WFGE	101.1	Country	Tyrone	Forever Broadcasting
WCHX	105.5	Mainstream Rock	Burnham	Mifflin County Communications, Inc.
WDBF	106.3	Country	Mount Union	Seven Mountains Media (Kristin Cantrell)
WQJU	107.1	Religious	Mifflintown	Central Pennsylvania Christian Institute

AM stations
Call letters	Frequency	Format	Location	Owner
WLUI	670	Oldies	Lewistown	Seven Mountains Media (Kristin Cantrell)
WKVA	920	Light AC	Burnham	WVNW, Inc.
WHUN	1150	News/Talk	Huntingdon	Seven Mountains Media (Kristin Cantrell)
WJUN	1220	Sports	Mexico	Seven Mountains Media (Kristin Cantrell)

=== Cable television ===
Lewistown was one of the first three communities that formed the cable company later known as Cox Communications.

== Education ==
The Borough of Lewistown is served by the Mifflin County School District. It is also home to the only local Catholic Elementary school, Sacred Heart of Jesus, which educates children of any religion in grades K–5.

Lewistown is home to the Pennsylvania State Fire Academy, which is the only such facility in the state.

== See also ==
- Indian Valley High School (Pennsylvania)
