= Mifflin County Courthouse =

- Mifflin County Historic Courthouse
- U.S. National Register of Historic Places
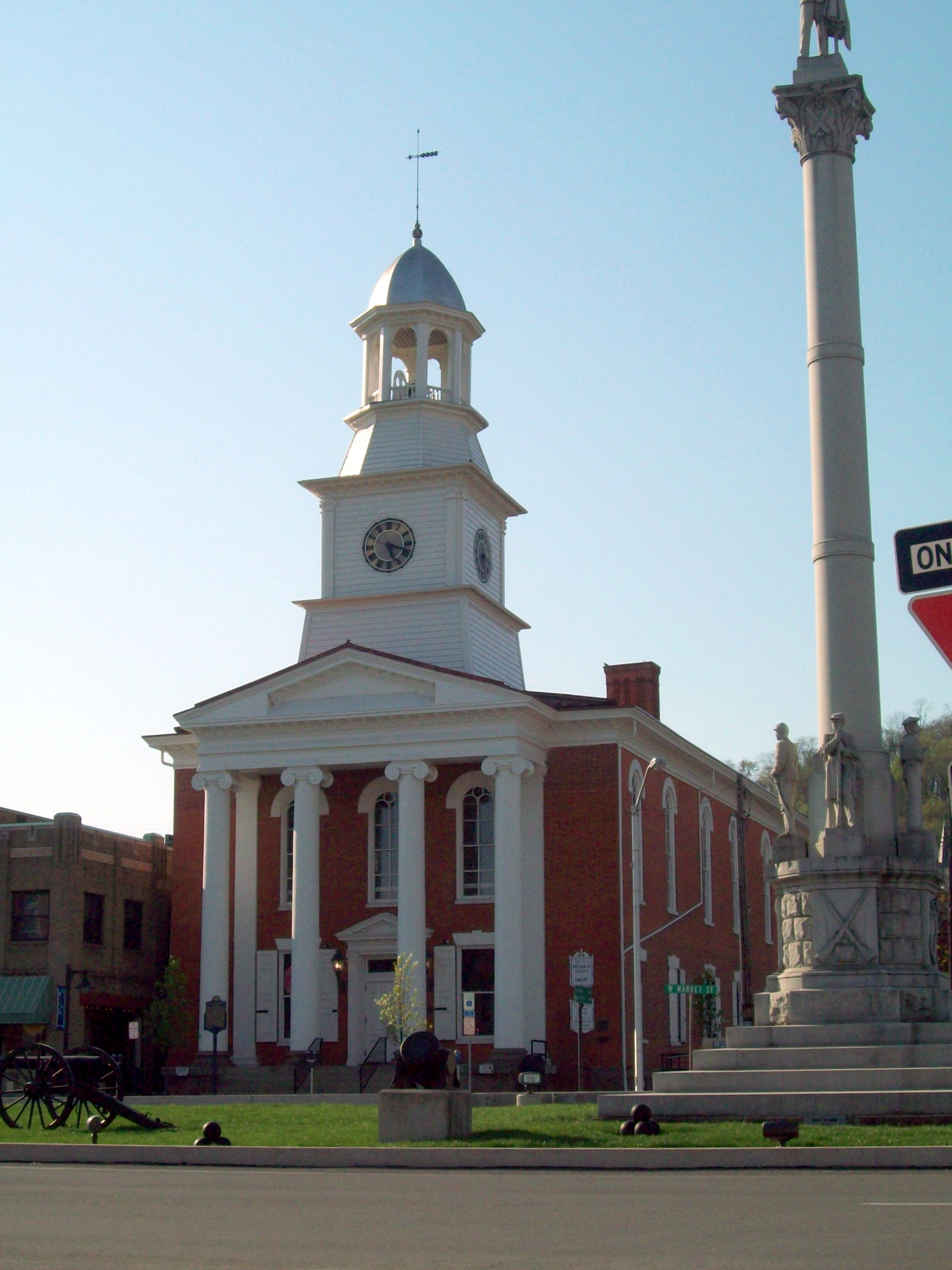
- Mifflin County Courthouse and War Memorial, April 2010

- Location within Pennsylvania Location within the United States
- Interactive map showing the location of Mifflin County Courthouse
- Location: 1 W. Market St., Lewistown, Pennsylvania
- Coordinates: 40°35′51″N 77°34′32″W
- Area: 1 acre (0.40 ha)
- Built: 1842-1843, 1878
- Architect: Holman & Simon; Ziegler, Daniel
- Architectural style: Greek Revival
- NRHP reference No.: 76001649
- Added to NRHP: May 28, 1976

The Mifflin County Historic Courthouse is an historic courthouse building in Lewistown, Mifflin County, Pennsylvania, United States.

The building was added to the National Register of Historic Places in 1976.

== History and architectural features ==
Built between 1842 and 1843, this historic structure is a two-and-one-half-story, brick building that was designed in the Greek Revival style, and is three-bays wide. The original building measured forty-eight feet by eighty-two feet. It was enlarged by forty-eight feet to the rear in 1878. It features a pedimented entryway with two engaged pilasters and prominent cupola.

The courthouse has been updated and restored, with the second floor courtroom restored to a late nineteenth-century appearance. An elevator was installed during the 1979 restoration, for accessibility to the courtroom. The building features large art works of local significance, and hosts the offices of the Mifflin County Historical Society, the Juniata River Valley Chamber of Commerce and the Juniata River Valley Visitors Bureau.

== See also ==
- List of state and county courthouses in Pennsylvania
