= Rudolph IV =

Rudolph IV or Rudolf IV may refer to:

- Rudolph IV, Count of Neuchâtel (1274–1343)
- Rudolf IV, Margrave of Baden-Pforzheim (died 1348)
- Rudolf IV, Duke of Austria (1339–1365)
- Rudolph IV, Count of Gruyère (1350–1403)
- Rudolf IV, Margrave of Hachberg-Sausenberg (1426/7–1487)
- Rudolph IV, Prince of Anhalt-Dessau (died 1510)

== See also ==
- Rudolph I (disambiguation)
- Rudolph II (disambiguation)
- Rudolph III (disambiguation)
