= Rudolph (name) =

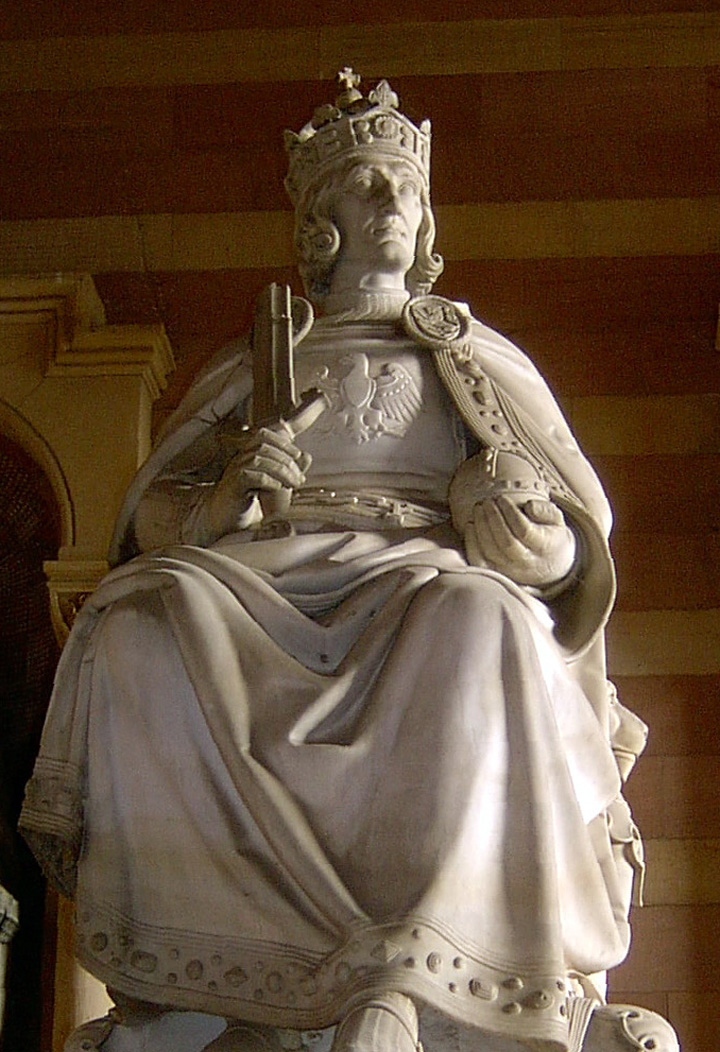
- King Rudolf the First of the German Habsburg Dynasty
- Pronunciation: /ruːdɒlf/; German: [ˈʁuːdɔlf]
- Gender: Male

Origin
- Origin: Indo-European; Germanic
- Meaning: "fame-wolf", "glory-wolf"
- Region of origin: Germanic countries (Germany, England, Scotland, the Netherlands, Scandinavian region)

Other names
- Derived: Hrōþiwulfaz
- Related names: Rudy (Nickname), Rodolfo, Ridolfo, Rolf, Ralph, Raul, Raoul, Rūdolfs
- See also: Robert, Roland, Roger, Rose, Roderick, Rodney, Raymond

Rudolph or Rudolf (French: Rodolphe or Raoul, Italian, Portuguese and Spanish: Rodolfo) or Rodolphe is a male first name, and, less commonly, a surname. It is an ancient Germanic name deriving from two stems: Hrōþi, Hruod, Hróðr or Hrōð, meaning "fame", "glory" "honour", "renown", and olf meaning "wolf" (Hrōþiwulfaz).

== In other languages ==
- Afrikaans: Roelof, Rudolf
- Albanian: Rudolf
- Arabic: رُودُلْف, romanized: rūdulf
- Armenian: Ռուդոլֆ (Rudolf)
- Catalan: Rodolf
- Croatian: Rudolf
- Czech: Rudolf
- Danish: Rudolf
- Dutch: Roelof, Rudolf, Ruud
- English: Rudolph, Rodolph, Rolph
- Estonian: Rudo, Ruudo, Ruudolf
- Finnish: Ruuto, Ruutolffi
- Flemish: Roel
- French: Rodolphe, Raoul
- Georgian: რუდოლფ (Rudolp)
- German: Rudolf, Rolf, Rudloff, diminutive: Rudi
- Greek: Ροδόλφος (Rhodólphos), Ράλλης (Rhálles)
- Hebrew: רודולף (Rudolf)
- Hungarian: Rudolf
- Indonesian: Rudolf
- Italian: Rodolfo
- Japanese:ルドルフ (Rudorufu), ルド (Rudo), ルディ (Rudi)
- Latin: Rudolphus
- Latvian: Rūdolfs, Rūdis
- Lithuanian: Rudolfas, Rudas, Rudis
- Manx: Roolwer
- Norwegian: Rudolf
- Polish: Rudolf
- Portuguese: Rodolfo
- Russian: Рудольф (Rudolf)
- Serbian: Rudolf (Рудолф)
- Slovak: Rudolf
- Slovene: Rudolf
- Spanish: Rodolfo
- Swedish: Rudolf

== Given name ==
=== Royalty and nobility ===
- Rudolph, Count of Ponthieu (died 866)
- Rudolph I of Burgundy (c. 859–912)
- Rudolph II of Burgundy (880–937)
- Rudolph of France (c. 890–936), reigned 923–936
- Rudolph III of Burgundy (c. 970–1032)
- Rudolf of Rheinfelden (1025–1080), Duke of Swabia
- Rudolph II, Count of Habsburg (died 1232)
- Rudolf I of Germany (1218–1291)
- Rudolf II, Duke of Austria (1270–1290)
- Rudolph I of Bohemia (1281–1307)
- Rudolf II, Count Palatine of the Rhine (1306–1353)
- Rudolph, Duke of Lorraine (1320–1346)
- Rudolf IV, Duke of Austria (1339–1365)
- Rudolph II, Holy Roman Emperor (1552–1612)
- Rudolf, Crown Prince of Austria (1858–1889), son and heir of Emperor Franz Joseph I of Austria and Empress Elisabeth of Austria (died at Mayerling)

=== Religious figures ===
- Rudolf of Fulda, 9th-century monk, writer and theologian
- Rudolf von Habsburg-Lothringen (1788–1831), Archbishop of Olomouc and member of the House of Habsburg-Lorraine
- Rudolf Baláž (1940–2011). Slovak Bishop of the Roman Catholic Diocese of Banská Bystrica from 1990 until his death in 2011
- Rudolph Grossman (1867–1927), Austrian-American rabbi

=== Wartime figures and military leaders ===
- Rudolf Freiherr Stöger-Steiner von Steinstätten, Colonel-General in the Austro-Hungarian army, the last Imperial Minister for War to the Austro-Hungarian Empire during World War I
- Rudolph Lambart, 10th Earl of Cavan, British Army officer and Chief of the Imperial General Staff
- Rodolfo Graziani, prominent Italian military officer in the Kingdom of Italy's Regio Esercito (Royal Army) and the Minister of National Defence of the Italian Social Republic
- Rudolph B. Davila, United States Army officer who received the Medal of Honor for his heroic actions in the European theatre during World War II
- Rudolph Bierwirth, General officer in the Australian Army
- Rudolf Anderson (1927–1962), U.S. Air Force pilot and first recipient of the Air Force Cross
- Rudolf von Bünau, German general in the Wehrmacht during World War II and one of the chief commanders of Vienna Offensive
- Rudolf von Brudermann, general of Austria-Hungary during the First World War who led the Austro-Hungarian 3rd army during the Battle of Galicia
- Karl Rudolf Gerd von Rundstedt, German field marshal in the Wehrmacht of Nazi Germany
- Rudolf Berthold (1891–1920), German World War I air ace
- Rudolph Douglas Raiford, American World War II combat officer
- Rudolf Christoph Freiherr von Gersdorff, German army officer who attempted to assassinate Adolf Hitler by suicide bombing on 21 March 1943, leader of the unit, soldiers of which discovered the mass graves of the Soviet-perpetrated Katyn massacre
- Rudolf Schmundt, German officer in the Wehrmacht and adjutant to Adolf Hitler during World War II, later tried to unsuccessfully assassinate Hitler
- Rudolf Viest, Slovak military leader, commander of the 1st Czechoslovak army during the Slovak National Uprising
- Rudolf Frank, German Luftwaffe military aviator and night fighter ace during World War II
- Rudolf von Eschwege, German World War I flying ace who was the German Empire's only fighter pilot operating on the Macedonian Front
- Rudolf Veiel, German Panzer general during World War II, one of the principal commanders of Battle of Greece
- Rudolf Sieckenius, German Generalmajor during World War II, one of the principal commanders of Battle of Berlin
- Rudolf von Slatin, Anglo-Austrian soldier and administrator in Sudan
- Rudolf Jordan, Nazi Gauleiter in Halle-Merseburg and Magdeburg-Anhalt
- Hans-Rudolf Rösing, German U-boat commander in World War II
- Rudolph Hiemstra, South African Air Force commander
- Rudolf Schmidt, general in the Wehrmacht of Nazi Germany during World War II
- Rodolfo P. Hernández, United States Army soldier
- Rudolf Perešin, Croatian fighter pilot serving in the Yugoslav Air Force (JRZ) during Croatian War of Independence
- Rudolf Toussaint, German army officer, one of the principal Wehrmacht commanders fighting during Prague uprising of May 1945
- Rudolf Meister, German general in the Luftwaffe during World War II
- Rudolf Maister (1874–1934) Slovene military officer, poet and political activist, one of the leading perpetrators of Marburg's Bloody Sunday, one of the principal commanders of Austro-Slovene conflict in Carinthia

=== Nazis ===
- Rudolf Diels, German Nazi SS official and Director of German secret police Gestapo from 1933 to 1934
- Rudolf Brandt (1909–1948), German Nazi SS officer and leader of the Jewish skull collection project
- Rudolf Hess (1894–1987), Deputy Führer in Nazi Germany, one of the leaders of Beer Hall Putsch, best known for his solo flight to Scotland
- Rudolf Höss (1900–1947), German Nazi first commandant of Auschwitz concentration camp
- Rudolf Jung (1882–1945), Austrian from Bohemia and Nazi theoretician, wrote the first theoretical book on Nazism, “National Socialism: Its Foundations, Development, and Goals,” in 1919
- Rudolf Lange, Nazi German SS officer and one of the major perpetrators of the Holocaust, commander of Salaspils concentration camp, one of the leading perpetrators of Jelgava massacre and Rumbula massacre
- Rudolf Spanner, Director of the Danzig Anatomical Institute during World War II who set up a process to produce soap made from human corpses
- Rudolf Rahn, Nazi German politician and Plenipotentiary to the Italian Social Republic

=== Multi-fields ===
- Rudolf Steiner, Austrian philosopher, social reformer, architect, and esotericist

=== Literature ===
- Rudolf G. Binding, German writer and supporter of Hitler
- Rūdolfs Blaumanis, Latvian writer, journalist and playwright, considered one of the greatest writers in Latvian history and particularly a master of realism
- Rudolf Christoph Eucken (1846–1926), German philosopher
- Rudolf Fischer, German writer
- Rudolf Löwenstein, German writer
- Rudolf Arapović (1937–2007), Croatian Writer and Dissident

=== Movie industry ===
- Rudolph Anders, American actor
- Rudolph Sternad, American art director and production designer
- Rudolf Buitendach, South African born film director and editor
- Rudolph Cartier, Austrian television director, filmmaker, screenwriter and producer who worked predominantly in British television, exclusively for the BBC
- Rudolf Carl, Austrian actor
- Rudolf Christians, German actor
- Rudolf Icsey (1905–1986), Hungarian cinematographer
- Rodolfo "Rudy" Mancuso, American actor, Internet personality and musician most notable for his comedic videos on YouTube and previously on Vine
- Rudolf Martin, German actor working mainly in the United States
- Rudolph Maté, Polish-Hungarian-American cinematographer, film director and film producer
- Rudolf "Ruud" Kleinpaste, Dutch-New Zealand naturalist and TV host
- Rudolph Schildkraut, Austrian film and theatre actor
- Rudolf Ising, member of the American animation team Harman and Ising, known for founding the Warner Bros. and Metro-Goldwyn-Mayer animation studios and creating the Looney Tunes
- Rudolf Jugert, German film director
- Rudolph G. Kopp (1887–1972), Austrian composer
- Rudolf Platte, German actor
- Rudolf Prack, Austrian actor
- Rudolph Valentino (1895–1926), Italian silent film actor
- Rudolf van den Berg (1949–2025), Dutch film director and screenwriter
- Rudolph Walker (born 1939), British actor
- Rudolf Noelte, German film director, theater director and opera director
- Rudy Wurlitzer (born 1937), American novelist and screenwriter
- Rudolf Bernhard (1901–1962), Swiss actor and theater director
- Rudolf Meinert, Austrian screenwriter, film producer and director
- Rudolf Hrušínský (1920–1994), Czech actor
- Rudolf Zehetgruber (1926–2023), Austrian film director, producer, screenwriter and actor
- Ruedi Walter (1916–1990), Swiss comedian and actor

=== In science and technology ===
- Ralph H. Baer (Rudolf Heinrich Baer) (1922–2014), German-American video game pioneer, inventor, engineer
- Rudolf Rudy Ballieux (1930–2020), Dutch immunologist
- Rudolph Boysen (1895–1950), American horticulturist, creator of the boysenberry
- Rudolf Clausius, German physicist and mathematician
- Rudolf Diesel (1858–1913), German inventor of the diesel engine
- Rudolf Erren (1899-unk.), German hydrogen-engine pioneer
- Rudolf Hauschka (1891–1969), Austrian chemist, author, inventor, entrepreneur and anthroposophist
- Rudolf Leuckart (1822–1898), German zoologist
- Rudolf Fleischmann (1903–2002), German experimental nuclear physicist
- Rudolf Kochendörffer (1911–1980), German mathematician
- Rudolf E. Kálmán (1930–2016), Hungarian-born American electrical engineer, mathematician, and inventor of the Kalman filter
- Rudolf Jaenisch (born 1942), German biologist, Professor of Biology at MIT and a founding member of the Whitehead Institute for Biomedical Research
- Rudolf Ernst Brünnow (1858–1917), German-American orientalist and philologist
- Rudolph John Anderson (1879–1961), American biochemist
- Rudolph A. Marcus (1923–2026), Canadian Nobel Prize-winning chemist
- Rudolf Robert Maier (1824–1888), German pathologist
- Rudolf Simek (born 1954), Austrian Germanist and philologian
- Rudolf Jakob Camerarius (1665–1721), German botanist
- Rudolf Virchow (1821–1902), German physician and biologist
- Rudolf Wolf (1816–1893), Swiss astronomer and mathematician
- Rudolf Peierls (1907–1995), British physicist
- Rudolf Wagner (1805–1864), German anatomist and physiologist and the discoverer of the germinal vesicle

=== Musicians ===
- Rudolf Friml (1879–1972), American composer and pianist
- Rudolf Baumgartner, Swiss conductor and violinist
- Rudolf Bing (1902–1997), Austrian-American opera impresario
- fr:Rodolphe Burger, French composer
- Rudolf Friml (1879–1972), composer of operettas, musicals songs and piano pieces, and a pianist
- Rudolph Ganz, Swiss-born American pianist, conductor, composer, and music educator
- Rodolfo "Fito" Páez (born 1963), Argentine singer-songwriter
- Rudolph Isley (1939–2023), American singer-songwriter and is one of the founding members of The Isley Brothers
- Rudolf Schenker (born 1948), German guitarist and founding member of heavy metal band Scorpions
- Rudolph Lewis, British bass-baritone
- Rudolf Fischer, German musician
- Wage Rudolf Supratman (1903–1938), Indonesian songwriter, and the composer who wrote both the melodies and lyric of the anthem Indonesia Raya

=== Political figures ===
- Rudolf Anschober (born 1960), Austrian politician
- Rudolf von Auerswald, Prime Minister of Prussia during the Revolution of 1848
- Rudolph "Rudy" Boschwitz, American politician from Minnesota
- Rudolf "Rudy" Andeweg, Dutch political scientist
- Rudolph Blankenburg, businessman, manufacturer, and politician from Philadelphia
- Rudolf Buttmann, German politician and diplomat
- Rudolf Engelhard (born 1950), German politician
- Rudolph "Rudy" Giuliani (born 1944), American lawyer, businessman, and politician from New York City
- Rudolf Gnägi, Swiss politician
- Rudolf E. A. Havenstein, German lawyer and president of the Reichsbank (German central bank) during the hyperinflation of 1921–1923
- Rudolph K. Hynicka, American politician from Ohio
- Rudolf Katz, German politician and judge
- Rudolph King, American politician from Massachusetts
- Rudolf Kirchschläger, Austrian diplomat, politician and judge, eighth President of Austria
- Rudolf Kjellén, Swedish political scientist and politician who first coined the term "geopolitics"
- Rudolf Krohne (1876–1953), German jurist and politician
- Rudolf Minger, Swiss politician and member of the Swiss Federal Council
- Rudolph "Rudy" Perpich, former governor of Minnesota
- Rudolph Jay Schaefer I, president of F. & M. Schaefer Brewing Company
- Rudolf Scharping, German politician (SPD) and sports official who served as 12th Minister of Defence of Germany
- Rudolf Seiters, German politician of the CDU (Christian Democratic Union) party
- Rudolph G. Tenerowicz, American politician from the U.S. state of Michigan
- Rudolf "Rudi" Vis, Dutch-born British politician and Member of Parliament

=== Middle name ===
- Charles Rudolph Walgreen Jr., president of Walgreens and the chairman of the board
- Gerald Rudolph Ford, American politician who served as the 38th president of the United States

=== Dancers ===
- Rudolf von Laban (1879–1958), Austrian choreographer
- Rudolf Nureyev (1938–1993), Soviet-born dancer

=== Other ===
- Rodolph Austin, Jamaican footballer
- Rudolf Bahro, East German dissident
- Rudolf Caracciola, German racing driver
- Rudolph Contreras, American jurist
- Rudolph "Rudy" J. Castellani Jr., American pathologist
- Rudolf Dassler, German businessman known for sportswear company Puma
- Rudolph B. Davila, United States army officer
- Rudolf Hrubý (1954–2023), Slovak businessman
- Rudolph Weaver, American architect, university professor and administrator
- Rudolf "Rudi" Assauer, German football manager and player
- Rudolf Abel, the alias of Vilyam Genrikhovich Fisher (1903–1971), a Russian spy
- Rudolf Amelunxen, German politician
- Rudolf Minkowski, American astronomer
- Rudolf Dreikurs, Austrian psychiatrist and educator
- Rudolf "Rudi" Dutschke, spokesperson of the 1960s German student movement
- Rudolf "Rudi" Fischer, Swiss racing driver
- Rodolfo "Corky" Gonzales, Mexican American boxer, poet, and political activist
- Rudolph Walton, American merchant after whom was named Rudolph Walton School in Philadelphia
- Rudolph A. Peterson, American banker
- Rudolph A. Seiden, American chemist and Zionist activist
- Rudolph Ackermann, Anglo-German bookseller, inventor, lithographer, publisher and businessman
- Rodolphe Adada, Congolese politician and diplomat
- Rodolfo Acquaviva, Italian Jesuit missionary to India
- Rudolph Aggrey, American diplomat
- Rudolf Smend, German theologian
- Rudolph A. Marcus, Canadian-born chemist who received the 1992 Nobel Prize in Chemistry for his contributions to the theory of electron transfer reactions in chemical systems
- Rudolf Robert Maier, German pathologist
- Rudolph "Bingo" Kampman, Canadian ice hockey player
- Rudolf Baumbach, German poet
- Rudolph Hering (1847–1923), American civil engineer
- Rudolph A. Herold, American architect
- Rudolf "Rudi" Hess, American fine art painter, sculptor and art critic, who was based in Northern California
- Rudolph Loewenstein, Polish-born American psychoanalyst
- Rudolf Horn, Austrian biathlete and cross-country skier
- Rudolf Plyukfelder, Ukrainian weightlifter
- Rudolph Hass, American developer of the Hass avocado, the source of 95% of California avocados grown commercially today
- Rudolf Fischer, Romanian historian
- Rudolf Rocker, German anarchist writer and activist
- Rudolf Dassler (1898–1974), German businessman
- Rodolphe Saadé (born 1970), French billionaire businessman
- Rudolf Schindler, German physician and gastroenterologist
- Rudolph Schindler, American architect
- Rudolph Moshammer, German fashion designer
- Rudolf Molleker, German tennis player
- Roudolphe Douala, Cameroonian retired footballer
- Rudolf Wittkower, American art historian
- Rudolph Koenig, German physicist
- Rudolf Geiger, German meteorologist and climatologist
- Rudolf Tombo Jr. (1875–1914), American philologist
- Rudolf Ziegler, German rowing coxswain
- Rudolph Nickolsburger, Hungarian footballer
- Rudolf "Rudi" Gernreich, American fashion designer
- Rudolf Holzapfel, Polish-born Austrian psychologist and philosopher
- Rudolph Fentz, focal character of "I'm Scared", a 1952 science fiction short story by Jack Finney, which was later reported as a real person in an urban legend
- Rudolph "Rudy" Hatfield, American-Filipino basketball player
- Rudulph Evans, American sculptor from Washington, D.C.
- Rudolph Emmerich, German bacteriologist noted for his advances against cholera and his co-invention of the first antibiotic drug Pyocyanase with Oscar Löw
- Rudolf von Alt, Austrian landscape and architectural painter
- Rudolph "Rudy" Sikich, American football player
- Rudolf Otto, German Lutheran theologian, philosopher, and comparative religionist
- Rudolph Edward Torrini, American artist from St. Louis
- Rudolf "Rudi" Skácel, Czech footballer
- Rudolf Steiner, Austrian philosopher, social reformer, architect and esotericist
- Rudolph Fisher, African-American physician, radiologist, novelist, short story writer, dramatist, musician, and orator
- Rudolph "Rudy" Johnson, American football player
- Rudolf Wanderone, American billiards player, also known as "Minnesota Fats"
- Rudolph A. Peterson, American banker who served as the president and CEO of Bank of America and administrator of the United Nations Development Programme
- Rodolfo Walsh, Argentine writer and journalist of Irish descent, considered the founder of investigative journalism, known for his Open Letter from a Writer to the Military Junta
- Rodolphe Lemieux, Canadian parliamentarian and long time Speaker of the House of Commons of Canada
- Rudolf Pleil, German serial killer
- Rudolf Spielmann (1883–1942), Austrian chess player
- Rudolf Straeuli (born 1963), South African rugby player and coach
- Rudolf Völler (born 1960), German football player
- Rudolf Vrba (1924–2006), Slovak-Canadian pharmacologist and Auschwitz escapee
- Rudolf Poch, Austrian doctor, anthropologist, and ethnologist
- Rudolph "Rudy" LaRusso (1927–2004), American basketball player
- Rudolph Arvid Peterson (1904–2003), American banker
- Rudolph Ulrich (1840–1906), German-American landscape gardener
- Rudolf Zistler, Austro-Hungarian socialist and lawyer
- Preston Rudolph "Rudy" York, American baseball player
- Rudolph Wurlitzer (1831–1914) German American businessman, founder of The Rudolph Wurlitzer Company
- de:Rudolf Wacker, Austrian painter
- Rudolf Zwirner (born 1933), German art dealer
- Rudolf Koch (1876–1934), German type designer
- Rodolfo "Rudy" Fernández y Farrés, Spanish basketball player
- Rudolph Gerhardus Snyman, South African rugby player

=== Fictional ===
- Rudolph the Red-Nosed Reindeer, fictional character created by Robert L. May in 1939
- Rudolf, a character from 2016 animated film Rudolf the Black Cat

== Surname ==
=== Athletes ===
- Ernie Rudolph (1909–2003), American baseball pitcher
- Gergely Rudolf (born 1985), Hungarian football player
- Jack Rudolph (American football) (1938–2019), American football player
- Jacques Rudolph (born 1981), South African cricketer
- Kyle Rudolph (born 1989), American football player
- Mason Rudolph (American football) (born 1995), American football player
- Mason Rudolph (golfer) (1934–2011), American golfer
- Nils Rudolph (born 1965), German freestyle swimmer
- Travis Rudolph (born 1995), American football player
- Wilma Rudolph (1940–1994), American athlete

=== In film and television ===
- Alan Rudolph (born 1943), American film director and screenwriter
- Maya Rudolph (born 1972), American actress and comedian
- William Rudolph (died 1975), American film technician

=== In science and technology ===
- Arthur Rudolph (1906–1996), German rocket scientist who helped develop the V-2 and the Saturn V
- Emanuel David Rudolph (1927–1992), American botanist, lichenologist, and historian of botany

=== In music ===
- Anna Lemmer Badenhorst Rudolph (1924–1995), South African composer and author
- Jean-Joseph Rodolphe (1730–1812), French horn player, violinist and composer.
- Max Rudolf (conductor) (1902–1995), German conductor who spent most of his career in the United States
- Kevin Rudolf (born 1983), American musician, singer-songwriter and music producer

=== Other ===
- Albert Rudolph, birth name of Swami Rudrananda, American entrepreneur and spiritual teacher
- Eric Rudolph (born 1966), American serial murderer and terrorist
- Jørgen Wilhelm Rudolph (1881–1968), Norwegian businessperson
- Julia Ann Rudolph (c. 1820–c. 1890), American photographer
- Nico Rudolph (born 1989), German politician
- Paul Rudolph (architect) (1918–1997), American architect
- Robert Knight Rudolph (1906–1986), American theologian
- Robert Livingston Rudolph (1865–1930), American bishop and theologian
- Vernon Rudolph (1915–1973), American businessman, founder of Krispy Kreme Doughnuts

== See also ==
- Rudy, nickname for Rudolph
- Ralph, nickname for Rudolph
- Raul/Raoul
- Rolf
- Rodolfo
- Roderick
- Roger
- Roland
- Robert
- Ludolf
- Ludolph
