= Rudolph, Count of Neuchâtel =

Rudolph, Count of Neuchâtel may refer to:

- Rudolph I, Count of Neuchâtel (died c. 1148)
- Rudolph II, Count of Neuchâtel (died 1196), poet
- Rudolph III, Count of Neuchâtel (died 1272)
- Rudolph IV, Count of Neuchâtel (died 1343)
