= Dennis Lachter =

- Born: Russian: Деннис Лахтер, Hebrew: דניס לכטר; June 20, 1971 (age 53); Kurumkan, Buryat ASSR, USSR
- Citizenship: Russian, Israeli
- Occupation: Football agent

Dennis Lachter (Russian: Деннис Лахтер, Hebrew: דניס לכטר) is a football agent. The first FIFA football agent from Russia. He is known as an agent representing the interests of such football players as: Andrey Arshavin, Daniel Carvalho, Peter Crouch and others.

== Early life ==
Dennis Lachter was born on June 20, 1971, in Transbaikalia, in the village of Kurumkan. Dynasties of the military, athletes and doctors can be traced in the Dennis family.

Childhood was spent in Irkutsk, the family lived in a communal apartment on the outskirts of Irkutsk - Glazkovo. He became interested in playing football at the age of five. Football has become the main hobby and pastime. Football has become the main hobby. Playing for different Irkutsk teams, he won regional and city competitions. The tournaments were held in various parts of the Soviet Union: in Angarsk, Barnaul, Birobidzhan, Blagoveshchensk, Bratsk, Chita, Klaipėda, Kemerovo, Leningrad, Minsk, Moscow, Nakhodka, Rubtsovsk, Simferopol, Sverdlovsk, Ulan-Ude, Usolye-Sibirskoye, Vilnius, Vladivostok, and many others, as well as in sister cities of Irkutsk: Karl-Marx-Stadt (GDR) and Kanazawa (Japan).

From 14 to 16 years old, Dennis played in the “Trud” youth sports school, got into the Second League team “Zvezda Irkutsk” (coach - Sergey Muratov), from there he moved to the FSC Bukovyna Chernivtsi to the famous coach Efim Shkolnikov. After that, I managed to visit the double of “Chernomorets Odessa” with Viktor Prokopenko. In 1988, Dennis began studying to be a dental technician, continuing his studies after demobilization from the Soviet army (he served from the beginning of 1990 to November 1991 in a sports company).

After serving, Dennis left to play for the Austin (football club "Austin-Alamo").

In 1992, there was a serious car accident. After 3 months of treatment, Dennis was able to return to training. In the first game after recovery, he was injured, after which he could not continue his football career.

== Education ==
From September 1988 to December 1989 and from November 1991 to June 1992 he studied at the Medical College of Irkutsk with a degree in Dental Technician.

In 1995–1999, he attended the United States Athletic Academy (Daphne, Alabama).

In 1999–2000, he studied at the University of Texas (Austin, Texas).

In 2004–2006 he studied at Tel Aviv University (Tel Aviv, Israel).

From January to March 2009, he studied at the SDA Bocconi School of Management (Milan, Italy), from March to September – at the University of Neuchâtel (Switzerland).

From September to December 2009, he studied at De Montfort University (Leicester, England) at the Faculty of Sports Humanities.

== Football agent ==
On December 17, 1992, he was licensed n.007 as a FIFA football agent in Zürich, Switzerland.

In 1994, Dennis was invited to supervise the national football teams of Romania, Bulgaria and Russia at the 1994 World Cup in the United States. At the championship, Dennis met many football functionaries from different countries of the world, as well as with such football players as: Sergei Gorlukovich, Valery Karpin, Dmitry Kharin, Aleksandr Mostovoi, Andrey Pyatnitsky, Dmitry Radchenko, Omari Tetradze, Gheorghe Hagi, Gheorghe Popescu, Krassimir Balakov, Emil Kostadinov, Yordan Letchkov, Hristo Stoichkov and other footballers. After the World Cup in 1994, MLS (Major League Soccer) was formed, in which Ivan Gazidis became one of the founders of the management company, who later became MLS deputy commissioner. Later, this acquaintance played a decisive role in the transfer of Andrey Arshavin from FC Zenit Saint Petersburg to Arsenal F.C.

As a football agent, Dennis Lachter worked with Andrei Arshavin, Daniel Carvalho, Peter Crouch, Andrei Lunev, Oleksandr Aliyev, Artem Milevsky, Rodrigo, Rodolfo, Dudu Cearense, Ayila Yussuf, Leandro Paredes, Emmanuel Emenike, Anderson. While working as a football agent, Lachter has lived in the United States, Belgium, Russia and Israel at various times.

== Personal life ==
Dennis Lachter is married and has eight children.
