= Tombo =

Tombo can refer to:

== Places ==
- Tombo, Sierra Leone, a coastal town
- Tombo Island, Guinea

== Arts and entertainment ==
- Tombo (album), a 2008 album by Masami Akita
- A character in Kiki's Delivery Service, a 1989 Japanese animated film, and a 2014 live-action film of the same title
- Tombo, a character in Stitch!, a Japanese anime television series

== People ==
- Tombo Winters (c. 1938–2004), Aboriginal Australian activist
- Rudolf Tombo Jr. (1875–1914), American philologist

== Other uses ==
- Tombo (registry) a Portuguese registry for land and royal revenue in Portuguese Ceylon
- Tombo Ahi, a Japanese name for albacore tuna, referencing the fish's dragonfly-like, long pectoral fins
- Tombo language, one of the Dogon languages

== See also ==
- Punta Tombo, Chubut Province, Argentina, a peninsula
- Tombos, Minas Gerais state, Brazil, a municipality
- Tombos (Nubia), Sudan, an archaeological site
