= Rudolph =

Rudolph or Rudolf may refer to:

== People ==
- Rudolph (name), the given name including a list of people with the name

=== Religious figures ===
- Rudolf of Fulda (died 865), 9th century monk, writer and theologian
- Rudolf von Habsburg-Lothringen (1788–1831), Archbishop of Olomouc and member of the House of Habsburg-Lorraine

=== Royalty and nobility ===
- Rudolph I (disambiguation)
- Rudolph II (disambiguation)
- Rudolph III (disambiguation)
- Rudolph of France (died 936)
- Rudolph I of Germany (1218–1291)
- Rudolf II, Holy Roman Emperor (1552–1612)
- Rudolph, Prince of Anhalt-Zerbst (1576–1621)
- Rudolf, Crown Prince of Austria (1858–1889), son and heir of Emperor Franz Joseph I of Austria and Empress Elisabeth of Austria (died at Mayerling)

== Places ==
- Rudolph Glacier, Antarctica
- Rudolph, South Dakota, US
- Rudolph, Wisconsin, US, a village
- Rudolph (town), Wisconsin, adjacent to the village
- Rudolf Island, northernmost island of Europe
- Lake Rudolf, now Lake Turkana, in Kenya

== Art, entertainment, and media ==
=== Fictional entities ===
- Rudolph the Red-Nosed Reindeer, one of Santa Claus's reindeer
- Rudolph Farnsworth, a minor villain in the television series Kim Possible
- Rudolph, alternate name for Gossamer, a Looney Tunes character
