= Ludolph =

Ludolph may refer to:

- Ludolph of Ratzeburg (died 1250), Bishop of Ratzeburg and saint
- Ludolph of Saxony (c. 1295–1378), German ecclesiastical writer
- Ludolph Berkemeier (1864–1930), Dutch painter
- Ludolph Christian Treviranus (1779–1864), German botanist
- Ludolph van Ceulen (1540–1610), German mathematician
- Ludolph Hendrik van Oyen (1889–1953), Chief of Staff of the Royal Netherlands East Indies Army during World War II, one of the principal commanders of the Indonesian National Revolution

== See also ==
- Ludolf
- Rudolph (disambiguation)
