= Levi Hill =

American minister and photographer (1816–1865)

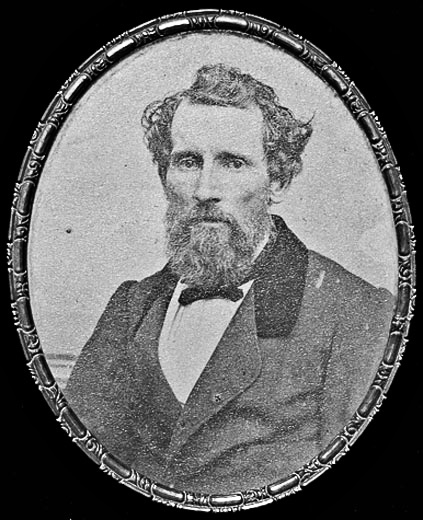
Levi Hill

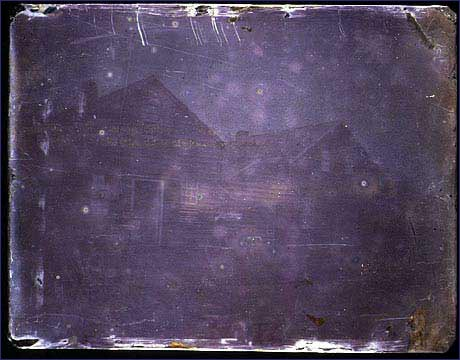
Hillotype view of houses, c. 1850

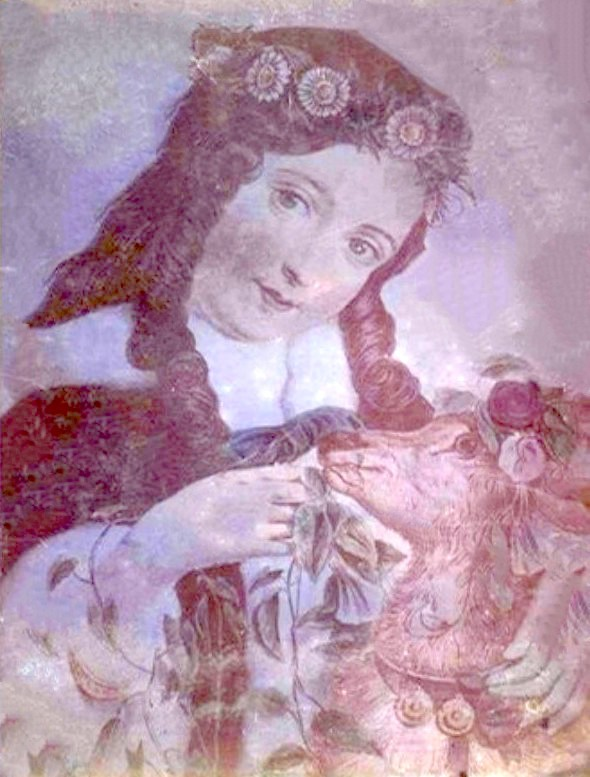
Hillotype of a colored engraving

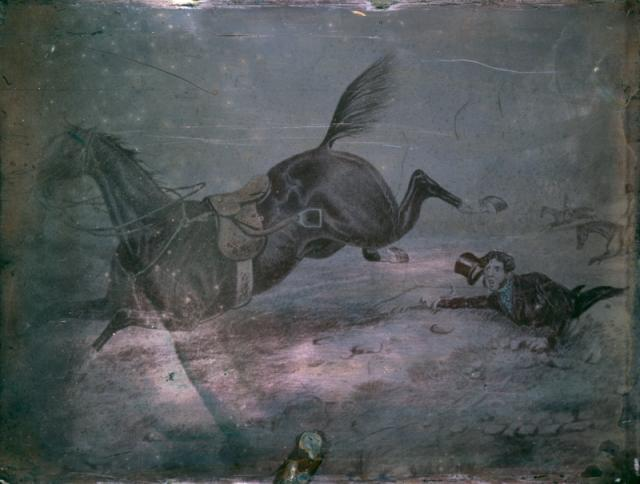
Hillotype of a colored engraving

Levi Hill (26 February 1816 − 9 February 1865) was an American minister in upstate New York who claimed in 1851 that he had invented a color photographic process. Borrowing terms previously introduced in France, Hill called his process "heliochromy" and the photographs that it produced "heliochromes", but by analogy to the naming of the then-current daguerreotype process after its inventor Louis Daguerre, Hill's color photographs were soon being called "Hillotypes". Hill's work was met with skepticism during his lifetime, then for more than a hundred years after his death histories of photography routinely dismissed it as a complete fraud. Later researchers found that his very difficult process did in fact have a limited ability to reproduce the colors of nature.

== Life and work ==
Levi Hill was, among other things, a Baptist minister in Westkill (Greene County) in the New York Catskill Mountains area.

In the early 1840s, Hill learned the daguerreotype process, the only photographic process commonly used during that decade. It yielded black-and-white photographs that reproduced light and shade but not color. By 1851, Hill had worked out his own very different version of the process, which he claimed was able to reproduce the colors of the subject, too. Though many were of the opinion that the color in Hill's photographs was added by hand-tinting, he received support from some in the scientific community, most notably Samuel F. B. Morse, inventor of the telegraph.

The claims made for Hill and his commercially unavailable secret process drew both skepticism and wrath from some professional photographers, who believed that clients were putting off having their pictures taken until they could be Hillotyped in color. In 1851, photographer Daniel DeWitt Tompkins Davie, then-president of the Association of Daguerreotypists, assembled an investigating team that pronounced Hill's invention "a delusion."

In 1856, Hill wrote A Treatise on Heliochromy, a book that promised to reveal his secrets at last. It was available only by advance subscription for $25 a copy, an exorbitant price at that time (in contemporary US gold coins, well over an ounce of pure gold). Davie obtained a court order banning the sale of Hill's book on the grounds that it libeled him and his committee, with the result that most of the edition was pulped. The few surviving copies show that the book consists of a rambling autobiography, a history of photography, a cookbook for many other processes, and finally a recipe for making Hillotypes that is so chemically complicated it is practically unworkable.

Hill died in 1865 at the age of 48, possibly a victim of his long and incautious exposure to the many extremely poisonous and corrosive chemicals involved in his experiments.

== Subsequent research ==
In 1981, photography professor and historian Joseph Boudreau compounded the archaic chemistry and replicated the techniques described by Hill in A Treatise on Heliochromy. Boudreau was able to create Hillotypes that distinctly and verifiably showed muted reproductions of many of the colors in the test subjects photographed, including red, green, blue, yellow, magenta and orange; these colors were all produced by the action of light alone, without the application of dyes or pigments.

In 2007, A chemical analysis of Hill's plates by researchers affiliated with the National Museum of American History, found that pigments had indeed been used to enhance the colors in some Hillotypes, but that this accounted for only some of the photographs' color. They found that reds and blues had for the most part been genuinely (if crudely) reproduced photographically, but that other colors had been fraudulently added. Getty Conservation Institute senior scientist Dusan Stulik, who performed the analysis with colleague Art Kaplan, concluded that “[a]fter pressure mounted to produce additional colors ... Hill began adding additional pigments to his color plates by hand, doctoring them to look more multi-hued than the originals."
