= Rodolfo =

- Pronunciation: Italian: [ro'dolfo] Spanish: [ɾoðolfo]
- Gender: Male
- Language: Spanish, Italian, Portuguese

Origin
- Origin: German
- Meaning: Rudolf
- Region of origin: Spain, Portugal, Italy

Other names
- Nicknames: Rudy, Dolf
- Related names: Rudolph, Rolf

Rodolfo is the Italian, Spanish and Portuguese form of the Germanic male given name Rudolph. Notable people with the name include:

- Rodolfo (footballer, born 1989), Rodolfo Xavier Neves, Brazilian striker
- Rodolfo (footballer, born 1991), Rodolfo Alves de Melo, Brazilian goalkeeper
- Rodolfo (footballer, born 1992), Rodolfo José da Silva Bardella, Brazilian forward
- Rodolfo (footballer, born May 1993), Rodolfo de Almeida Guimarães, Brazilian attacking midfielder
- Rodolfo (footballer, born October 1993), Rodolfo Freitas da Silva, Brazilian forward
- Rodolfo Albano III, Filipino politician
- Rodolfo Vera Quizon Sr. (1928-2012), Filipino actor and comedian better known as Dolphy.
- Rodolfo Bodipo (born 1977), naturalized Equatoguinean football striker
- Rodolfo Dantas Bispo (born 1982), Brazilian footballer
- Rodolfo Calle (born 1964), Bolivian politician
- Rodolfo Camacho (born 1975), Colombian road cyclist
- Rodolfo Escalera (1929–2000), Mexican American Oil Painter who specialized in realism
- Rodolfo Fariñas (born 1951), Filipino politician
- Rudy Fernández (basketball) (born 1985), Spanish basketball player
- Rodolfo Graziani (1882–1955), Italian military officer
- Rodolfo Jiménez (born 1972), Mexican actor and television host
- Rodolfo Landeros Gallegos (1931–2001), Mexican politician
- Rodolfo Martín Villa (born 1934), Spanish politician
- Rodolfo Massi (born 1965), Italian road bicycle racer
- Rodolfo Miguens (born 1976), Portuguese footballer and coach
- Rodolfo (footballer, born 1997), Brazilian footballer Rodolfo Tito de Moraes
- Rodolfo Morandi (1902–1955), Italian politician
- Fito Páez, Argentine musician Rodolfo Páez Ávalos
- Rodolfo Pereira de Castro (born 1995), Brazilian footballer
- Rodolfo Pérez (field hockey) (born 1967), Argentine field hockey player
- Rodolfo Pizarro (born 1994), Mexican footballer
- Rodolfo da Ponte (1938–2021), Paraguayan fencer
- Rodolfo Rodríguez (Uruguayan footballer) (born 1956), Uruguayan footballer
- Rodolfo Santos Soares (born 1985), Brazilian footballer
- Rodo Sayagues, Uruguayan screenwriter, producer, lyricist, actor and director
- Rudolph Valentino (1895–1926), Italian actor born Rodolfo Valentino
- Rodolfo Neri Vela (born 1952), Mexican astronaut
- Rodolfo Vieira (fighter) (born 1989), Brazilian practitioner of Brazilian jiu-jitsu
- Rodolfo Zelaya (born 2000), Salvadoran footballer
- Rodolfo Zapata (born 1966), American coach and former footballer
- Rodolfo Zapata (singer) (1932–2019), Argentine singer, songwriter, musician and actor
- Rodolfo Fattovich (1945-2018), Italian archaeologist of Africa

== Fictional characters ==
- Rodolfo the poet, the leading male character in La bohème by Giacomo Puccini
- A character in Luisa Miller by Giuseppe Verdi
- Rodolfo "Rudi", a character in Cocaine Godmother

== See also ==
- Rudolph (disambiguation)
