= Ludolf =

Ludolf is a Germanic surname or given name. It is derived from two stems: Hlud meaning "fame" and olf meaning "wolf". An alternate spelling of the name is Ludolph. People with the name include:

- George Philipp Ludolf von Beckedorff (1778-1858), prominent Prussian Roman Catholic convert and parliamentarian

== Surname ==
- Hiob Ludolf (1624–1704), German orientalist
- Heinrich Wilhelm Ludolf (1655–1712), German diplomat and linguist
- Jaan Ludolf (born 1940), Estonian chess master
- Julius Ludolf (1893–1947), SS officer and concentration camp commandant executed for war crimes

== Given name ==
- Ludolf von Alvensleben (Major General) (1844–1912), Prussian major general
- Ludolf von Alvensleben (1901-1970), Nazi official convicted in absentia for war crimes, son of the above
- Ludolf Jakob von Alvensleben (1899-1953), Nazi official
- Ludolf Bakhuizen (1630–1708), Dutch painter
- Ludolf Nielsen (1876-1939), Danish composer, violinist, conductor, and pianist
- Ludolf von Krehl (1861-1937), German internist and physiologist

== See also ==
- Ludolph
- Rudolph (disambiguation)
