= Daniel DeWitt Tompkins Davie =

American photographer

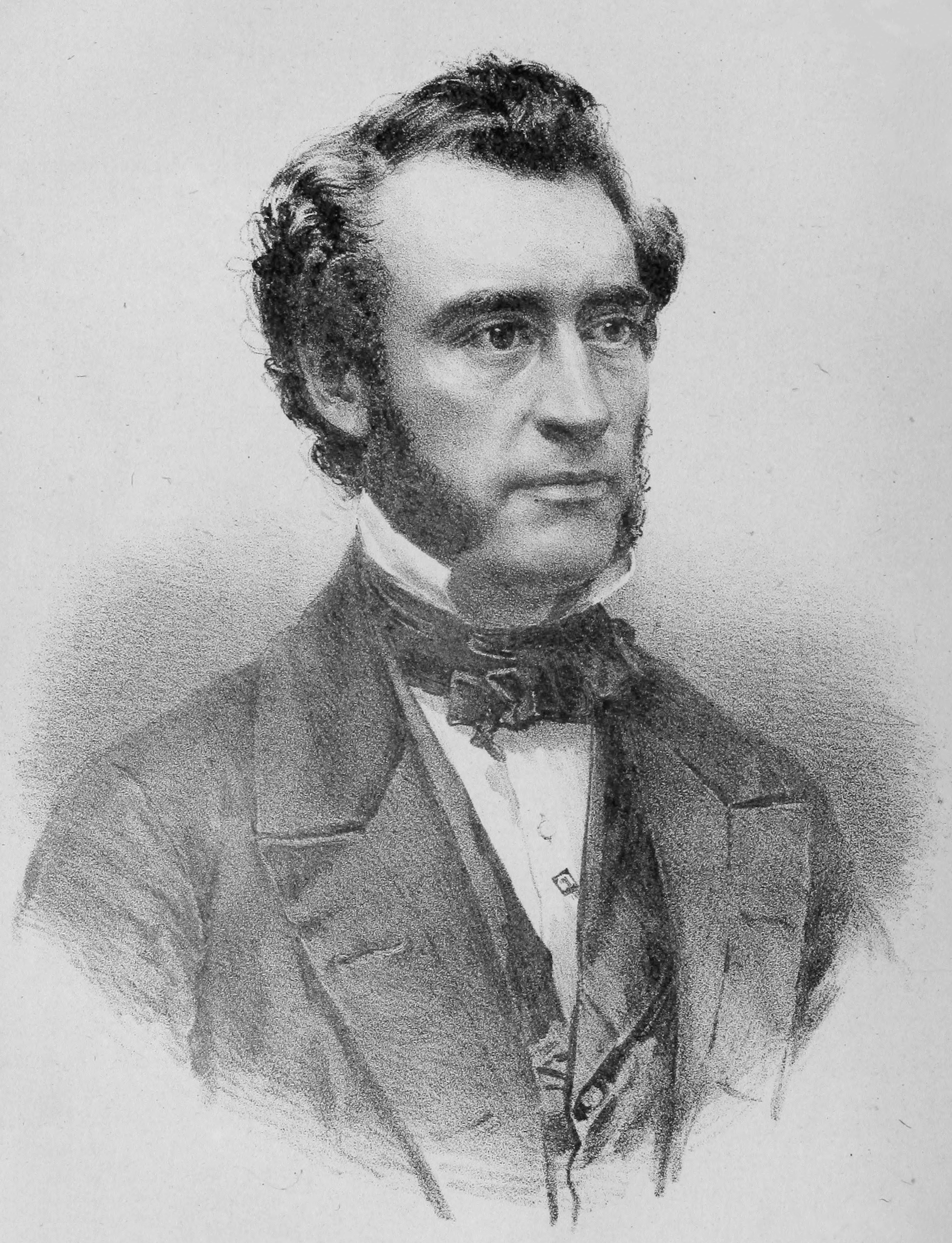
- Davie in 1851
- Born: 1816; Otsego, New York
- Died: February 12, 1877 (aged 60–61); Bolivar, New York
- Known for: daguerreotypes, inventions
- Spouse: Azubah Burdick
- Elected: 1st president, Association of Daguerreotypists

Daniel DeWitt Tompkins Davie (1816 – February 12, 1877), also known as D. D. T. Davie, was an American 19th-century photographer known as a pioneer of the daguerreotype in America and an innovator of photographic equipment and techniques. He was a key player in the controversy over Levi Hill's claim to have invented a process for producing color daguerreotypes.

== Personal life ==
Daniel DeWitt Tompkins Davie was born about 1820 in Otsego County, New York, to Christina Scism/Sissem Davie and Samuel Davie. His childhood was spent in Bolivar, New York as his parents moved there 23 Mar 1823 and were among the earliest settlers in this area. Little is known of his life before his marriage in 1839 to Azubah Burdick. The couple had four daughters and a son named after his father.

He died on 20 Feb 1877 in Alden, New York. His remains were brought to Bolivar, New York for interment at Maple Lawn Cemetery next to his parents.

== Photography career ==
Davie had wanted to be a painter but gave up the idea for financial reasons. Instead he learned the daguerreotype technique sometime after 1843, and in 1846, he opened his first photography studio, located in Utica, New York. Although Davie was almost entirely self-taught, his professional reputation developed rapidly, and in 1850 he traveled to Washington, DC, where he photographed nearly every member of both houses of Congress along with other public figures. His 1850 daguerreotype of Daniel Webster was considered in its day "one of the most striking likenesses" of that statesman.

In 1851, Davie expanded from taking photographs to manufacturing the chemicals used in the daguerreotype process. An innovator in photographic technology, he is credited with such inventions and improvements as the plate vise, the buffing lathe, a camera stand, and refined rotten stone. His most elaborate invention may have been an award-winning device called the American Photographer that clipped, crimped, cleaned, and buffed photographic plates. Davie also learned and experimented with the techniques for making albumen prints and stereoscopic transparencies.

In the 1850s, Davie opened a second daguerreotype studio in Syracuse, New York, this one in partnership with his brother Joseph. He also became the owner of a photographic gallery in Albany, New York.

Around the same time, Davie took on a partner in Utica, Gordon Evans with whom he published the monthly periodical Scientific Daguerreian of which no known copies survive. Davie's assistant for three years in the mid-1850s was the photographer Julia Ann Rudolph, then at the very beginning of her long career.

=== Heliochromy controversy ===
Davie was elected first president of the Association of Daguerreotypists in 1851, and in that capacity he oversaw a team of three experts investigating the Reverend Levi Hill's claimed invention of a process called "heliochromy" that could supposedly produce color daguerreotypes. The team reported bluntly that Hill's purported discovery was "a delusion." When a few years later Hill sought to publish his heliochromy formula, Davie obtained a court order banning the sale of Hill's book on the grounds that it libeled him and his committee, with the result that most of the edition was pulped. Recent researchers have found that Davie's team was not quite correct: although Hill appears to have faked some of the color in his images, it also appears that his process can indeed produce a muted color spectrum.
