= Amadeus, Count of Neuchâtel =

- Died: 1285
- Noble family: House of Neuchâtel
- Spouse: Jordanna of Arberg
- Father: Rudolph III, Count of Neuchâtel
- Mother: Sybille of Montbéliard

Amadeus, Count of Neuchâtel (died 1285) was a son of Count Rudolph III and his wife, Sybille of Montbéliard. In 1272, he succeeded his father as Count of Neuchâtel. However, his brothers questioned the legitimacy of his sole rule and demanded a share of his inheritance. They asked the grandfather Theodoric III, Count of Montbéliard to arbitrate the dispute. Theodoric deviated from the usual practice in those days, and decided that the county should be regarded as an indivisible entity. He awarded the county to Amadeus, but acknowledged that his brothers were entitled to a share. However, the brothers would have to swear allegiance to Amadeus.

== Marriage and issue ==
Amadeus was married to Jordane, the daughter of Aimon I de La Sarraz. They had the following children:

- Rudolph IV, his successor
- Amadeus, a knight
- Guillemette, later Countess of Montbéliard, married Reginald of Burgundy
- Adelaide, married Ulrich of Porta
- Sibylle
- Nicola, a cleric

Amadeus, Count of Neuchâtel House of Neuchâtel Died: 1285
Preceded by Rudolph III	Count of Neuchâtel; 1272–1285	Succeeded by Rudolph IV
