= Heliochrome =

Type of colour photograph of the 1800s

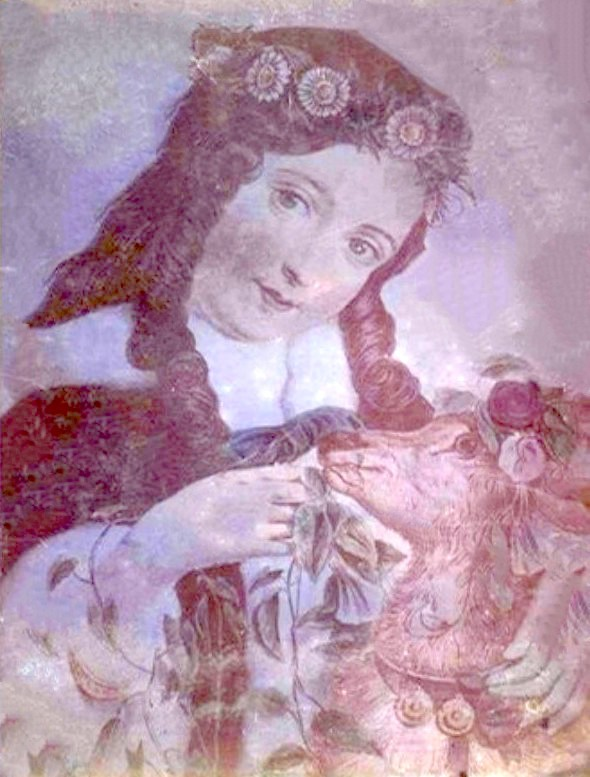
A circa 1850 "Hillotype" photograph of a colored engraving. Long believed to be a complete fraud, recent testing found that Levi Hill's process did reproduce some color photographically, but also that many specimens had been "sweetened" by the addition of hand-applied colors.

A heliochrome is a color photograph, particularly one made by the early experimental processes of the middle 19th to early 20th centuries. The word was coined from the Greek roots "helios", the sun, and "chroma", color, to mean "colored by the sun". It was applied to images as technologically diverse as Levi Hill's "Hillotypes" of the 1850s (Hill's instruction book was entitled A Treatise on Heliochromy), the three-color carbon prints made by Louis Ducos du Hauron in the 1870s, and the interference color photographs made by Gabriel Lippmann in the 1890s. It was also occasionally misapplied to images whose color was non-photographic, i.e., due to local coloring by handwork of some kind.
