= Rūdolfs =

- Gender: Male
- Name day: 17 April

Origin
- Region of origin: Latvia

Rūdolfs is a Latvian masculine given name, a cognate of the English given name Rudolph and may refer to:

- Rūdolfs Balcers (born 1997), Latvian ice hockey player
- Rūdolfs Bārda (1903–1991), Latvian footballer and basketball player
- Rūdolfs Baumanis (1909–1998), Latvian sports shooter
- Rūdolfs Blaumanis (1863–1908), Latvian writer, journalist and playwright
- Rūdolfs Gaitars (1907–1945), Latvian military Waffen-Obersturmführer in the Waffen SS during World War II
- Rūdolfs Jurciņš (1909–1948), Latvian basketball center and Olympic competitor
- Rūdolfs Kociņš (1907-1990), Latvian military leader, one of the principal commanders of Battle of More
- Rūdolfs Kundrāts (1904–????), Latvian football defender
- Rūdolfs Ronis (1897–1970), Latvian wrestler and Olympic competitor
- Rūdolfs Vītols (????–1942), Latvian track and field athlete and Olympic competitor
