= Andrey Arshavin =

Russian footballer (born 1981)

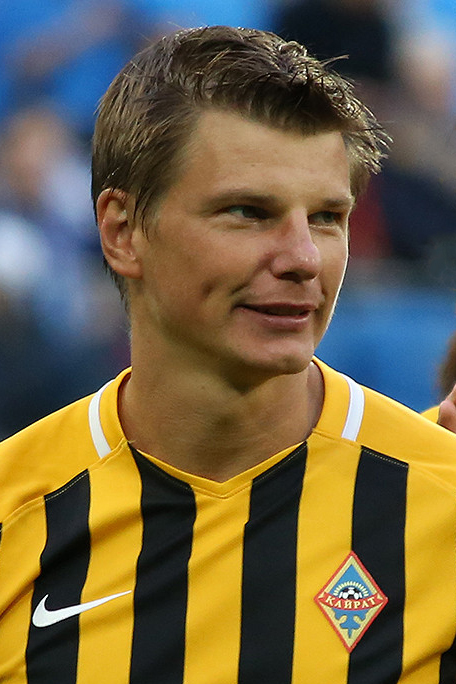
- Arshavin in 2018

Personal information
- Full name: Andrey Sergeyvich Arshavin
- Date of birth: 29 May 1981 (age 45)
- Place of birth: Leningrad, Soviet Union
- Height: 1.72 m (5 ft 8 in)
- Positions: Winger; attacking midfielder

Youth career
- 1988–1999: Zenit Saint Petersburg

Senior career*
Years	Team	Apps	(Gls)
1999–2008	Zenit Saint Petersburg	238	(51)
1999–2000	→ Zenit-2 St. Petersburg	56	(7)
2009–2013	Arsenal	105	(23)
2012	→ Zenit Saint Petersburg (loan)	10	(3)
2013–2015	Zenit Saint Petersburg	35	(3)
2015	Kuban Krasnodar	8	(0)
2016–2018	Kairat	84	(24)
Total		536	(111)

International career
2001–2003	Russia U21	9	(1)
2002–2012	Russia	75	(17)
Medal record
Men's football
Representing Russia
UEFA European Championship
Bronze medal – third place	2008 Austria & Switzerland
- * Club domestic league appearances and goals

Andrey Sergeyevich Arshavin (Russian: Андрей Сергеевич Аршавин, IPA: [ɐnˈdrʲej sʲɪrˈɡʲejɪvʲɪtɕ ɐrˈʂavʲɪn]; born 29 May 1981) is a Russian former professional footballer who played as a winger or midfielder. Since 2019, Arshavin has held administrative posts at Zenit. In 2022, he became Deputy General Director for Sports Development, and became a member of the club's executive board in 2023.

Arshavin began his career at Zenit Saint Petersburg in 2000. He went on to win numerous trophies with the club such as the Russian Premier League, League Cup, Russian Super Cup, UEFA Cup and the UEFA Super Cup. During his time with Zenit, Arshavin was also named as the Russian Footballer of the Year.

He had a breakout performance at UEFA Euro 2008 where he impressed throughout Russia's run to the semi-final of the tournament, and also finished 6th in the 2008 Ballon d’Or. Arshavin thereafter signed for English Premier League club Arsenal during the 2008–09 winter transfer window, becoming the most expensive player in Arsenal's history at the time, with a fee of £15 million. Arshavin eventually rejoined Zenit, at first on loan and then permanently in 2013.

== Early years ==
Arshavin was born in Leningrad, now Saint Petersburg, on 29 May 1981. His father Sergey Arshavin played as an amateur footballer. Arshavin survived an accident that could have killed him when he was hit by a car as a child. His parents divorced when he was 12, with Andrey having to sleep on the floor of a cramped flat with his mother. It was his father who persuaded him to pursue a career in football after his own failure to become a professional football player. While growing up he enjoyed playing chess, a popular sport in Russia.

Arshavin began playing football at an early age and at seven years of age, he was enrolled in the Smena football academy of Zenit, his hometown club. As a schoolboy before football became his sole focus, he was a talented draughts player. Arshavin's father died of heart failure at age 40. He has written three books, including one titled 555 Questions and Answers on Women, Money, Politics and Football. Arshavin also has a degree in Fashion Design. He often misbehaved at school, commenting, "I behaved badly at school. When I was in the second grade, I tore down the registering journal of the class." It was this incident described by Arshavin that saw him expelled.

== Club career ==
=== Zenit Saint Petersburg ===
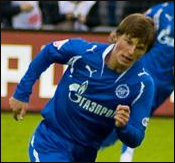
Arshavin playing for Zenit in 2008

In 2000, Arshavin was included in the Zenit first-team squad, making his debut in a 3–0 away win over English side Bradford City in the Intertoto Cup, coming on as a first-half substitute for Andrey Kobelev. He played in various positions on the field, starting as a right midfielder, then as an attacking midfielder, and finally adopted the second striker's role playing on a flank or behind the target man.

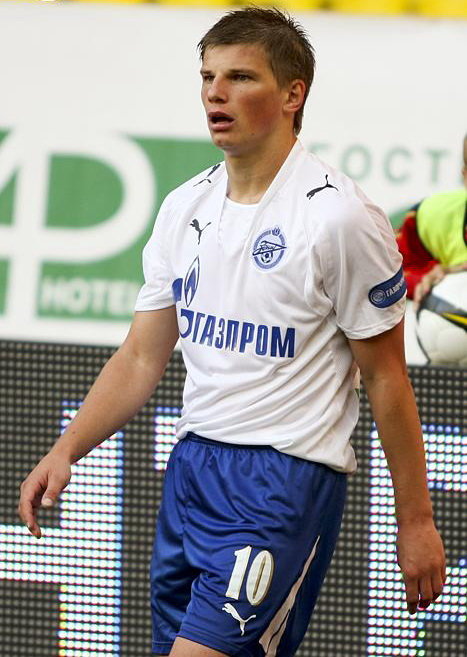
Arshavin playing for Zenit in 2008

In the 2007 Russian Premier League season, Shava (Шава in Russian), as he was nicknamed by Zenit fans, guided his Zenit side to the title in starting all 30 matches, scoring 11 goals and providing 11 assists which was the most in the Russian Premier League that year en route. It was the club's first league title since winning the now-defunct Soviet Top League in 1984. Arshavin was also a key player during Zenit's 2007–08 UEFA Cup triumph and was named Man of the Match in the final, again topping the list for assists in that season's UEFA competition. In October 2008, Arshavin was nominated for the prestigious Ballon d'Or award, along with 29 others in a list that included compatriot Yuri Zhirkov.

Arshavin's performances in the UEFA Cup and UEFA Euro 2008 brought him to the attention of several European clubs. However, interest had already been expressed in January 2008 by Newcastle United boss Sam Allardyce, but he was sacked as manager as the transfer window opened. In June 2008, Barcelona had their €15 million offer for the player turned down by Zenit. Additionally, Tottenham Hotspur's £16 million offer in August also fell short of Zenit's £22 million asking price. Zenit's unwillingness to compromise on their asking price caused discontent from both Arshavin and his agent Dennis Lachter.

During the January 2009 transfer window, Arshavin was persistently pursued by English Premier League club Arsenal. On 2 February, transfer deadline day, Arshavin was staying in a Hertfordshire hotel, just a few miles from the Arsenal training ground. At around 10 am, he left the hotel and was rumoured to be heading back to Russia, but with less than an hour of the transfer window left, a bid from Arsenal was finally accepted by Zenit. By this point, he had agreed personal terms and passed a medical, but a compensation payment by Arshavin himself to Zenit was supposedly holding up the deal. The deal was further complicated by a snowstorm in England that had delayed the Premier League's registration process, eventually forcing the league to extend the deadline beyond 5 pm. The deal was not confirmed until the following day (3 February), nearly 24 hours after the formal transfer deadline had passed, with Arsenal announcing "a long-term deal" for an undisclosed fee. On the same day, Zenit's official web site claimed that Zenit received an official FA letter confirming Arshavin's registration as an Arsenal player.

=== Arsenal ===
==== 2008–09 ====
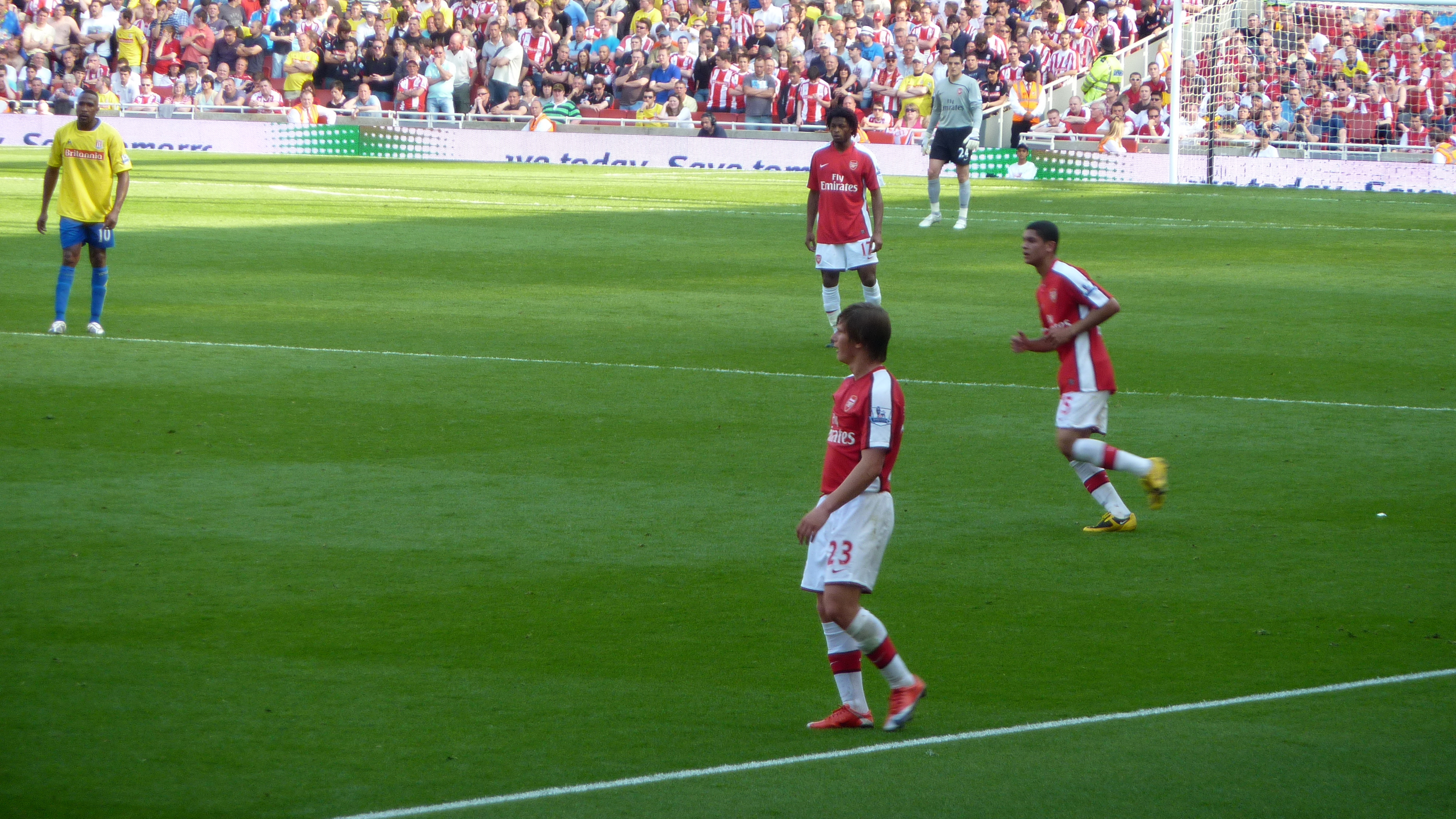
Arshavin in action for Arsenal against Stoke City in May 2009

At Arsenal Arshavin wore the number 23 shirt, last worn by Sol Campbell. As Arshavin had played for Zenit in the 2008–09 Champions League, he was cup-tied and could not play for Arsenal in the knockout phase. Arshavin made his debut for Arsenal against Sunderland on 21 February 2009 in the Premier League, which ended 0–0. On 3 March 2009, Arshavin made his first contribution in a Premier League game against West Bromwich Albion by setting up a goal for Kolo Touré in the 38th minute via a free-kick, the second goal in a 3–1 victory. On 14 March 2009, Arshavin scored his first Arsenal goal in a very tight angle going solo against Blackburn Rovers in the 65th minute of the game. He later provided an assist to Emmanuel Eboué for the third goal of the game, which ended 4–0 to Arsenal.

On 21 April 2009, Arshavin was named Man of the Match after he scored all four Arsenal goals in a tight match against Liverpool at Anfield, which ended 4–4. It was a thrilling encounter, and the first time Arshavin had scored four goals in one match in his entire career. He also became the first away player to score four goals in a single league match at Anfield since Dennis Westcott for Wolverhampton Wanderers in 1946, and the first Arsenal player to score four goals in any match since Júlio Baptista in 2007, who also achieved the feat against Liverpool at Anfield. Additionally, he became the sixth player in Premier League history to score four goals in an away match. Arshavin captained Arsenal for the first time on 2 May 2009 in an away match against Portsmouth, where they won 3–0 with Arshavin gaining two assists and a contentious penalty. On 8 May, he was named Premier League Player of the Month for April. He was also voted as Arsenal's Player of the Month for April and May and came second in Arsenal's Player of the Season poll, despite only playing in the second half of the season and playing in fewer than a quarter of Arsenal's matches all season.

==== 2009–10 ====
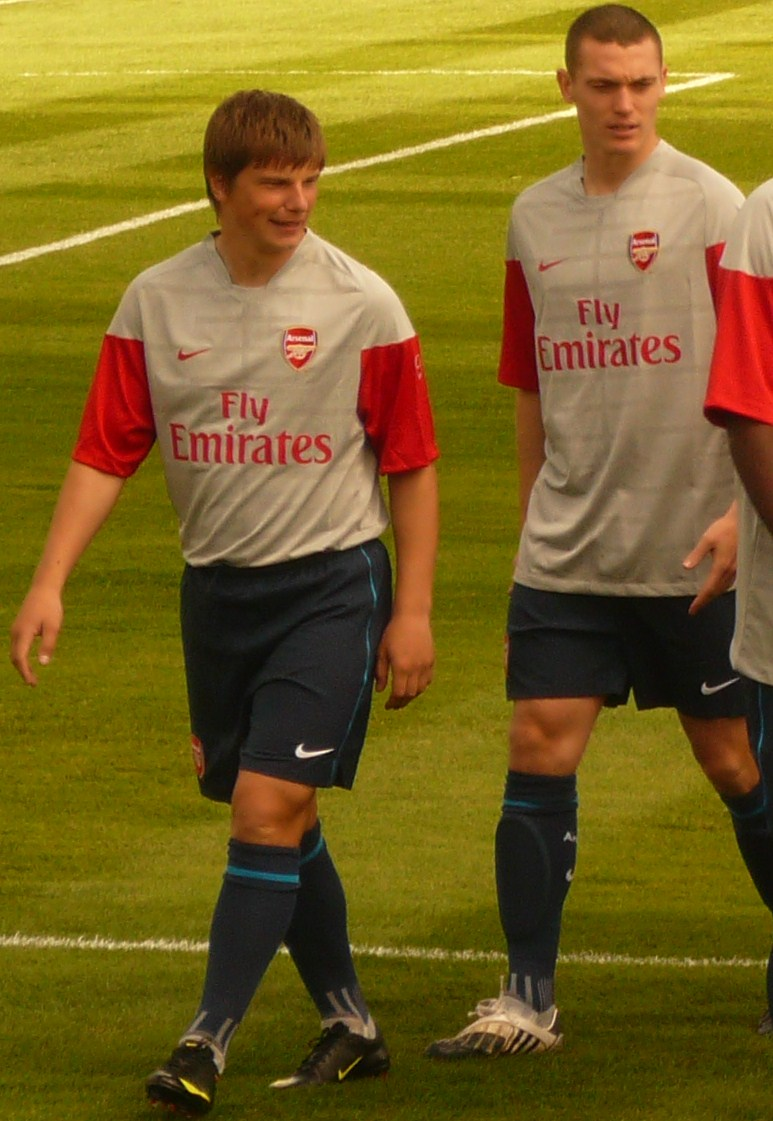
Arshavin (left) in training with Thomas Vermaelen

Arshavin came off the bench to score two goals in Arsenal's 2–1 pre-season victory on 1 August over Atlético Madrid in the Emirates Cup. Manager Arsène Wenger commented afterward that "[Arshavin] knows how English football works", adding, "He knows as well that now he's part of the team from the start. I believe the team knows as well how important (he is) and how big an impact he can have on the results." On 26 August 2009, Arshavin scored his first UEFA Champions League goal for Arsenal in the 74th minute in a 3–1 win over Celtic. He also scored a 30-yard shot against Manchester United at Old Trafford on 29 August 2009, which was his first goal of the season although Arsenal lost the match 2–1. In early December, Arshavin put in an excellent display against Stoke City, playing in an unfamiliar role as centre-forward left vacant after Robin van Persie's injury. He won a penalty which Fàbregas missed before scoring himself and later assisted the second goal, with Arsenal winning the match 2–0.

On 13 December 2009, Arshavin scored his fifth goal against Liverpool as Arsenal came from behind to beat Liverpool 2–1 at Anfield again, also winning the Man of the Match award in the end again. On 20 January 2010, he scored again in Arsenal's 4–2 victory over Bolton Wanderers, which helped Arsenal reach the top of the Premier League for the first time since August. However, he suffered a calf strain against Barcelona, ruling him out for three weeks. Arshavin missed one of two games in May due to injury, but scored for the last time of the season against Fulham, in a match which Arsenal won 4–0.

==== 2010–11 ====
On 17 July 2010, Arshavin scored the opening goal against Barnet in Arsenal's first pre-season friendly match of the season, which Arsenal won 4–0. He then won the Man of the Match award for best performance by Arsenal fans according to Arsenal's official website. On 21 August 2010, Arshavin scored his first goal of the season via a penalty for Arsenal in a 6–0 win over Blackpool after Marouane Chamakh was fouled by Ian Evatt in the penalty area. He also scored in Arsenal's very next game on 28 August 2010, scoring the winning goal against Blackburn Rovers for the third time when Cesc Fàbregas' shot was blocked and fell into the path of Arshavin, Arsenal winning the match 2–1.

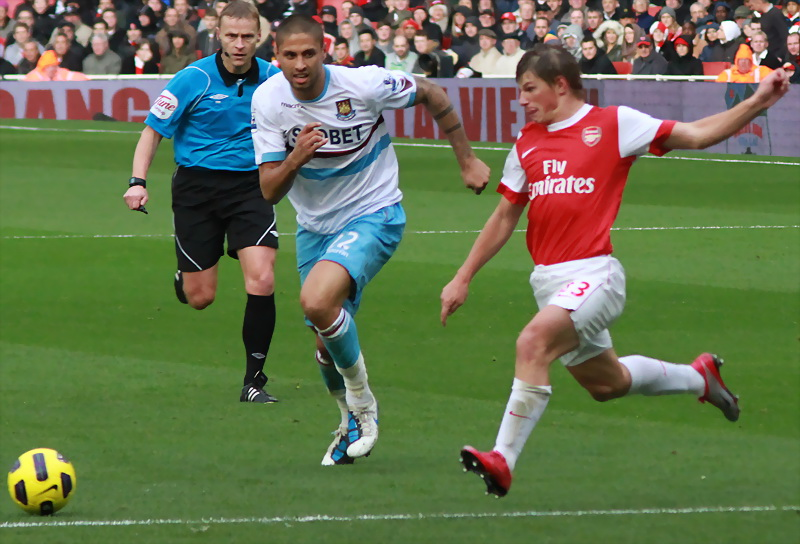
Arshavin in a Premier League match against West Ham United

On 15 September 2010, Arshavin scored and provided two assists against Braga in Arsenal's first Champions League group stage match, with Arsenal winning 6–0. On 18 September 2010, Arshavin scored his first League Cup goal, which was also Arsenal's fourth goal during extra time, to defeat Tottenham in the third round of the League Cup, with Arsenal winning against their arch rivals 4–1. He later scored Arsenal's first goal in a 3–1 midweek Champions League away win against FK Partizan in the 15th minute after a backheel pass by Jack Wilshere. Vladimir Stojković saved Arshavin's penalty in the second half after Marouane Chamakh was fouled in the penalty area.

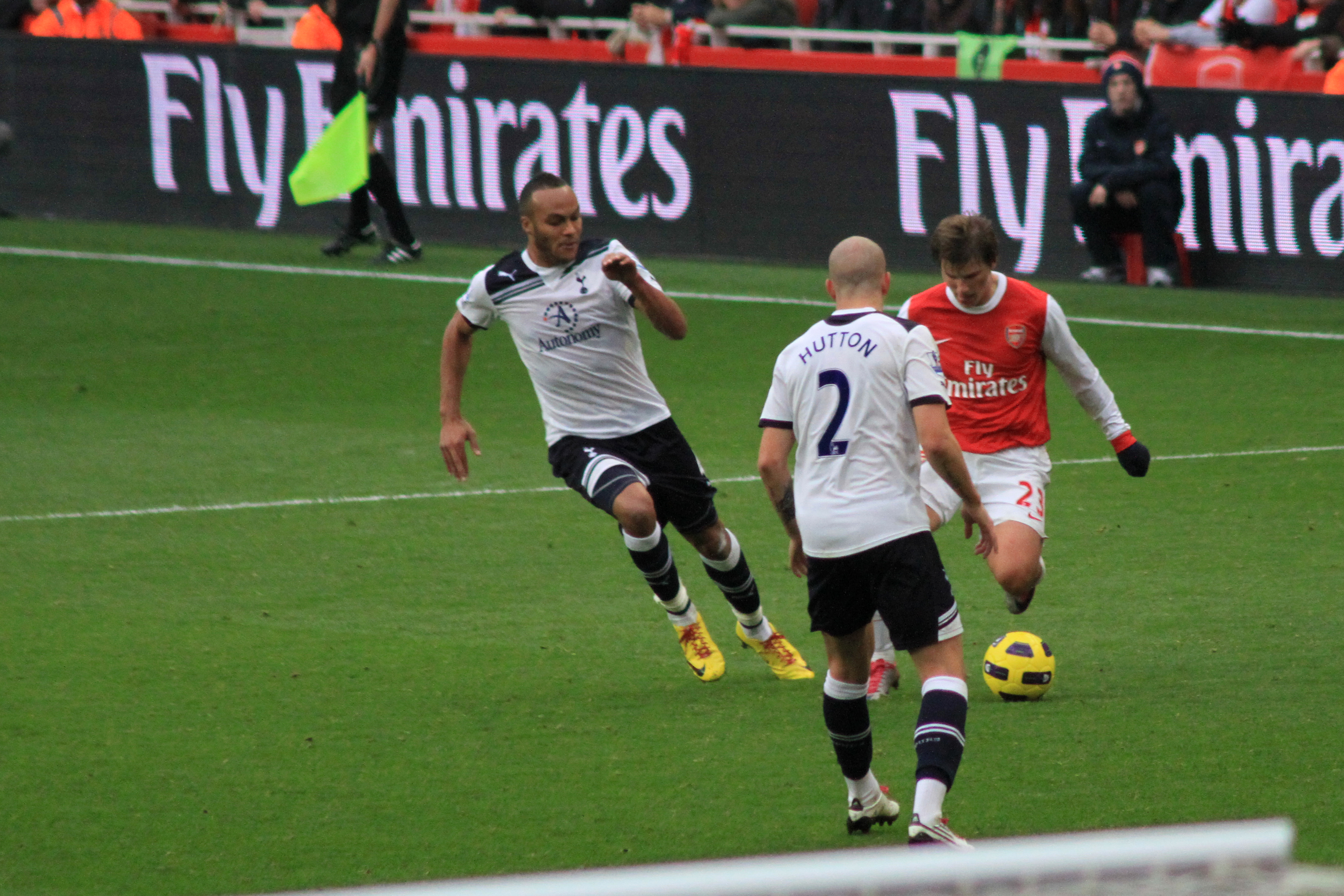
Arshavin against rivals Tottenham in November 2010

On 27 November 2010, Arshavin scored his first goal since September, which was the opening goal against Aston Villa in a 4–2 away win. On 29 December 2010, Arshavin scored a scissor kick volley to bring Arsenal level when they were 1–0 down to Wigan Athletic. He later made an assist for Nicklas Bendtner to put Arsenal 2–1 up, but after a Sébastien Squillaci own goal, the match ended 2–2. He then won the Man of the Match award for best performance by Arsenal fans for the second time.

On 1 February 2011, Arshavin came off the bench in the 62nd minute and scored his first 2011-goal and first goal since December just 8 minutes later to make Arsenal level when they were 1–0 down to Everton in a game that Arsenal won 2–1. He then won the Man of the Match award for best performance by Arsenal fans for the third time. On 16 February 2011, Arshavin scored as Arsenal beat Barcelona for the first time in their history in a 2–1 win in the Champions League round of 16. This was Arshavin's first Champions League goal for Arsenal not scored in the group stage. The next day, Arsenal centre back Johan Djourou stated that "Arshavin showed he is a great player," because of his winning goal and his rising performance from his recent dip in form. During his goal celebration against Barcelona, Arshavin memorably lifted up his jersey to reveal a t-shirt with an image of himself performing his normal finger-to-the-lips celebration.

On 20 February 2011, Arsenal faced Leyton Orient for The FA Cup fifth-round, a 1–1 draw in which Arshavin won the Man of the Match award for best performance by Arsenal fans for the fourth time, even though he did not score, though he did come close numerous times. Arshavin's next Premier League goal was away to West Bromwich Albion, bringing the score to 2–1 after West Brom had earlier taken a 2–0 lead. He also provided the cross for Robin van Persie's late equaliser in that game.

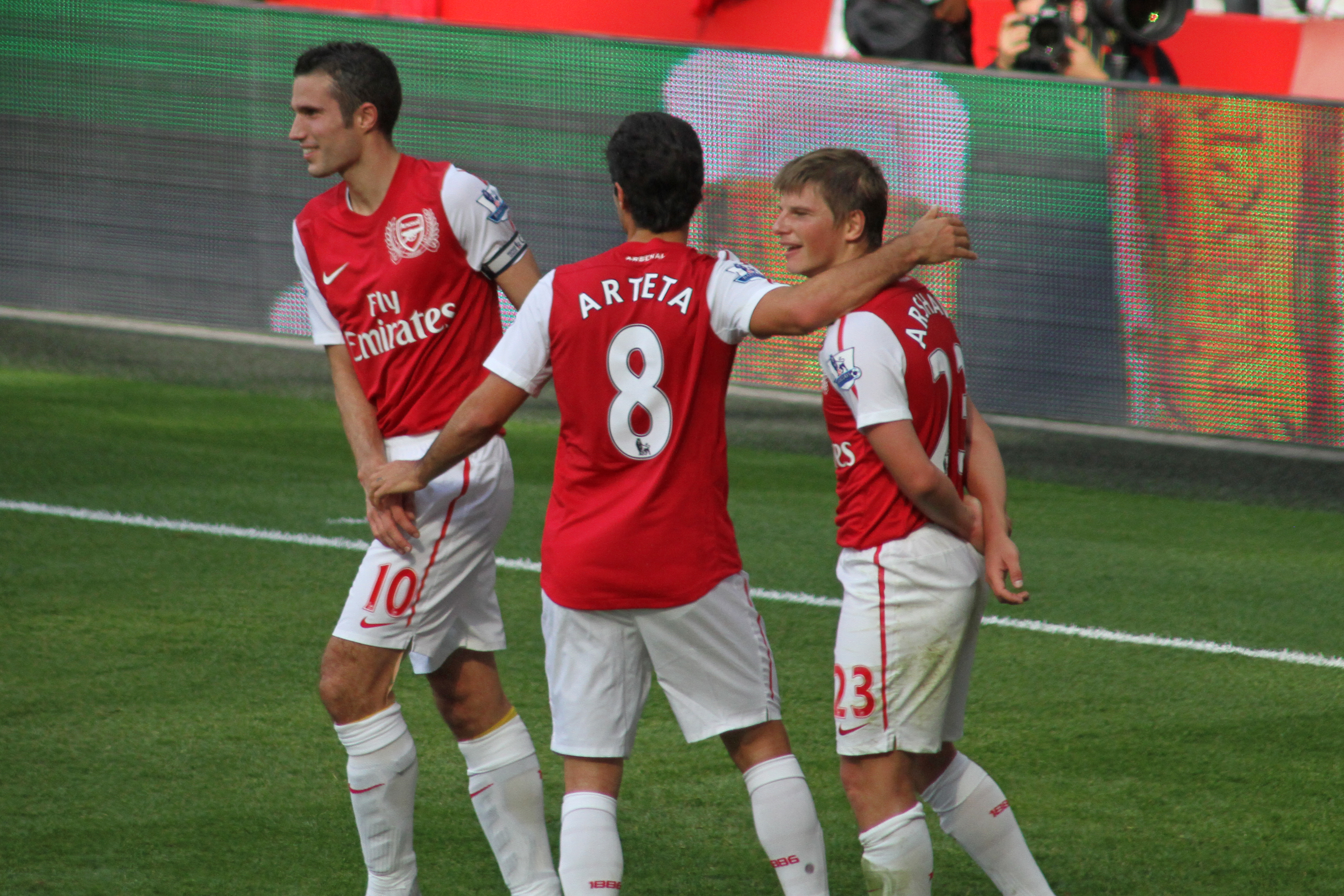
Robin van Persie and Mikel Arteta celebrate with Arshavin shortly after scoring his first goal of the season against Swansea City.

==== 2011–12 ====
On 10 September 2011, Arshavin scored his first goal of the season against Swansea City after a bizarre mistake by goalkeeper Michel Vorm. His other performances in the season were riddled with criticism about his refusal to track back and help with defense. During a home game against Manchester United, Arshavin was booed when he came on for Alex Oxlade-Chamberlain although it is believed that the booing was directed at the decision to make a substitution and not at Arshavin himself.

On 11 February 2012, Arshavin provided Thierry Henry with the winning goal in the match against Sunderland. After coming on during the second half, Arshavin found space to deliver a cross during injury time, from the left side of the pitch despite being marked by two players. The cross found Henry's foot and made it into the back of the net, allowing Henry to score on his final match for Arsenal.

===== Return to Zenit (loan) =====
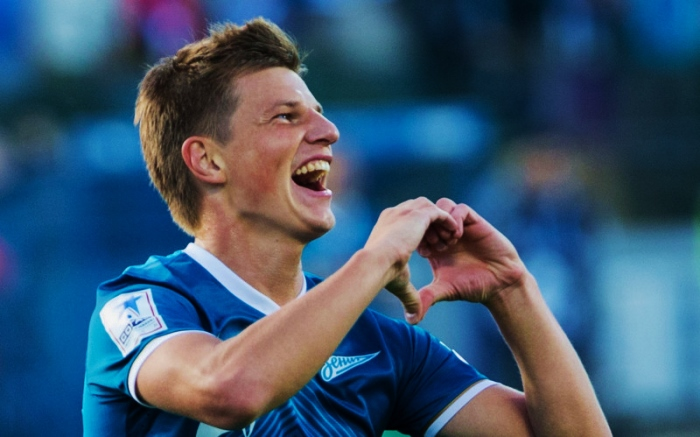
Arshavin celebrating a goal for Zenit with a ‘heart’ gesture, July 2013

Despite intense speculation that he would join Anzhi Makhachkala to reunite with former Russian national team coach Guus Hiddink, Arshavin sealed a loan move to his boyhood club Zenit Saint Petersburg for the remainder of the 2011–12 season. The deal was sealed just 40 seconds before the end of the Russian transfer window's deadline. An intention to hold on to a place in Russia's Euro 2012 squad was the reason behind Arshavin's move to Luciano Spalletti's side.

On 3 March, Arshavin made his loan debut for Zenit in an away fixture against CSKA Moscow which ended in a 2–2 draw. Arshavin wasn't eligible to feature in Zenit's 2–0 loss to Benfica in the last 16 of the Champions League. In total, Arshavin made 11 appearances in his second spell at Zenit, scoring three goals.

==== 2012–13 ====
Arshavin returned to Arsenal for the start of the 2012–13 season. He appeared as a 77th-minute substitute in their first game of the season, a 0–0 draw against Sunderland on 18 August 2012. On 26 September, Arshavin was handed his first start of the season in the League Cup. He scored the third goal and assisted two others in a 6–1 win over Coventry City. On 20 October, Arshavin made his 100th Premier League appearance for Arsenal in a 1–0 loss against Norwich City. He also played in Arsenal's 2–1 loss against Olympiacos in the Champions League on 4 December. Arshavin went on to leave Arsenal in June 2013. Overall, Arshavin scored 31 goals and provided 41 assists in 143 appearances for the club.

=== Return to Zenit ===
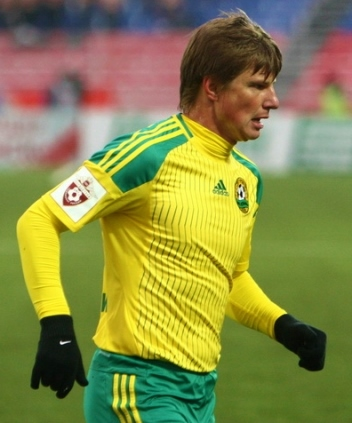
Arshavin playing for Kuban Krasnodar in 2015

On 27 June 2013, it was announced that Arshavin signed a two-year deal with Zenit, joining on a free transfer. Arshavin stated that he was "very happy to put on Zenit's shirt again."

Arshavin scored on his second league appearance for the club, opening a 1–1 draw at home to Kuban Krasnodar on 26 July, before netting again on 7 August, in a 5–0 win in the Champions League third qualifying round against FC Nordsjælland. In a total of 21 Russian Premier League appearances in 2013–14, he scored only one more goal, in a 4–0 away win at Rostov on 22 September, and Zenit finished the season as runners-up.

=== Final years as a player ===
On 13 July 2015, Arshavin signed for Russian side Kuban Krasnodar on a one-year deal. His contract was dissolved by mutual consent on 1 February 2016, after just 9 appearances. Some new outlets reported that Kuban Krasnodar had only signed him to boost the PR of the region's governor before the regional elections. After the governor lost the elections, Arshavin and the other big-money players were shipped out.

On 18 March 2016, Arshavin signed for Kazakhstani club FC Kairat on a one-year deal, with the option of a second year. He won the Kazakhstan Premier League's Player of the Month award for July 2016, and again in September 2016. Arshavin extended his stay at the club for an additional year on 9 November 2016. He would win the prestigious Kazakhstan Player of the Year award for 2016. Arshavin would go on to win the 2017 Kazakhstan Super Cup. On 5 November 2018, Kairat announced that Arshavin will leave the club after his farewell game on 11 November 2018. He scored 30 goals in 108 appearances for Kairat.

On 3 December 2018, Arshavin confirmed his retirement from professional football. He would later join upper management of his boyhood club, ZFK Zenit Saint Petersburg in 2019.

== International career ==
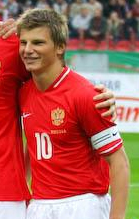
Arshavin playing for Russia

Arshavin debuted for the Russian national team on 17 May 2002, but was overlooked for the squads at the 2002 FIFA World Cup and Euro 2004. His first goal with the squad came in a friendly match versus Romania on 13 February 2003. Since then, he managed to score or assist in every competition which Russia participated in. He was Russia's captain in a Euro 2008 qualifier against Estonia. On 11 June 2009, Arshavin was made first-choice captain for Russia by manager Guus Hiddink.

=== UEFA Euro 2008 ===
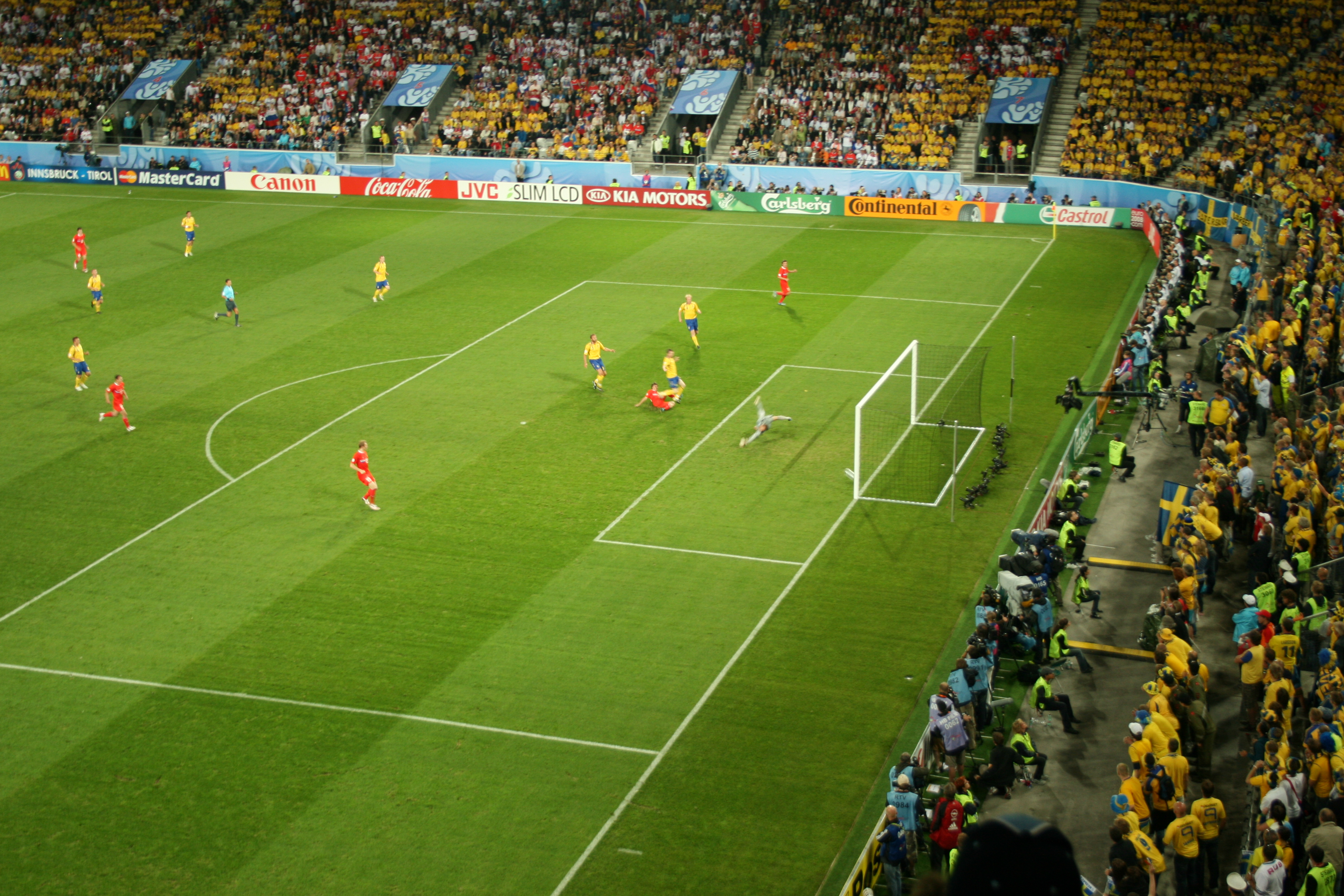
Arshavin scoring against Sweden in Euro 2008. He scored twice during the tournament.

Arshavin was included in Russia's Euro 2008 squad by Guus Hiddink, despite being unable to play in the first two group matches due to suspension. He announced his return by setting up the first goal and scoring the second in Russia's final group game against Sweden at Tivoli Neu, Innsbruck, which helped his team qualify for the next round.

In the next match, the quarter-final against the Netherlands, Arshavin repeated the feat with his part in Russia's two goals in the second half of extra time, providing the cross for Dmitri Torbinski's goal and scoring his own four minutes later. Russia consequently reached the semi-finals with a 3–1 victory. For both of these games, UEFA awarded him Man of the Match. However, Arshavin could not repeat the heroics in the semi-final against eventual winners Spain, which Russia lost 3–0. Despite this, Arshavin was named in UEFA's squad for Euro 2008. He, along with the rest of the Russian team, received a bronze medal.

=== 2010 World Cup qualifying ===
Arshavin captained the team to a second-place finish in their group, scoring three goals in ten games. He provided the assist for Diniyar Bilyaletdinov's second goal to seal a 2–1 win over Slovenia in the first leg of the qualification play-offs. Despite this, Russia lost the second leg 1–0, knocking them out of the World Cup finals on away goals.

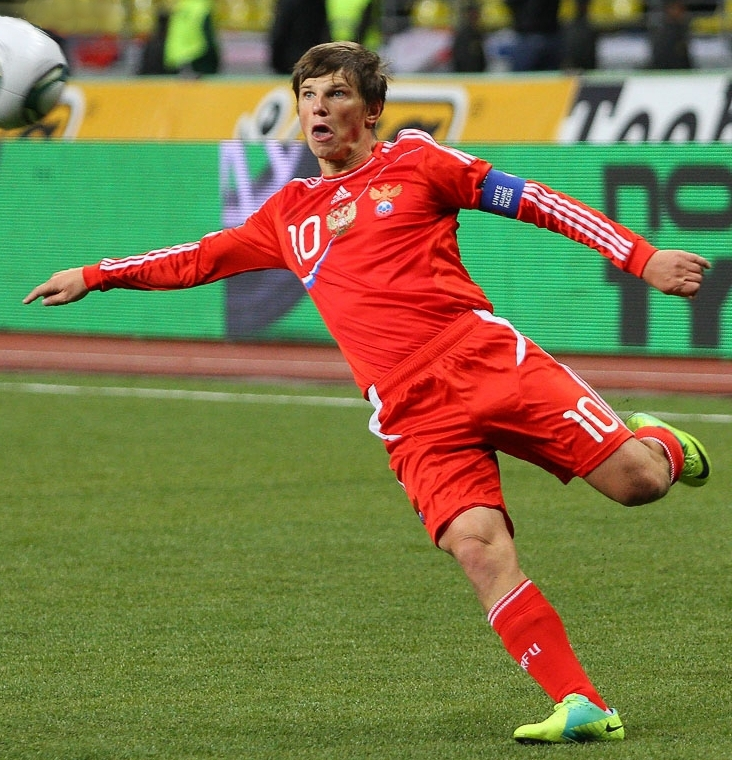
Arshavin captaining Russia in 2011

=== UEFA Euro 2012 ===
Arshavin was confirmed for the finalized UEFA Euro 2012 squad on 25 May 2012. He started all three of their games in the group stage of Group A, as Russia were eliminated in the group stage, finishing third place behind on the head-to-head ruling. Nonetheless, Arshavin was statistically named the best midfielder of the tournament by UEFA, having earned the most assists in the fewest minutes on the pitch (270 minutes). After the tournament, Russian fans were left disappointed by comments from Arshavin, who said: "the fact that we [Russian national team] hadn't exceed your [fans] expectations is not our [the players'] problem, it is your [fans'] problems." Arshavin later apologized for his comment as well as Russia's early exit from the tournament. Nevertheless, a shortened version of Arshavin's comment ("Your expectations are your problems", Russian: "Ваши ожидания — ваши проблемы") has become a meme in Russia.

After playing in new manager Fabio Capello's first match in charge, a friendly match with Ivory Coast, Arshavin was omitted from Russia's squad for the entirety of its 2014 World Cup qualification campaign. He would not feature for the national team after the 2012 Euros, due to a breakdown in relations with the fans and his perceived lack of effort

== 2018 World Cup bid ==
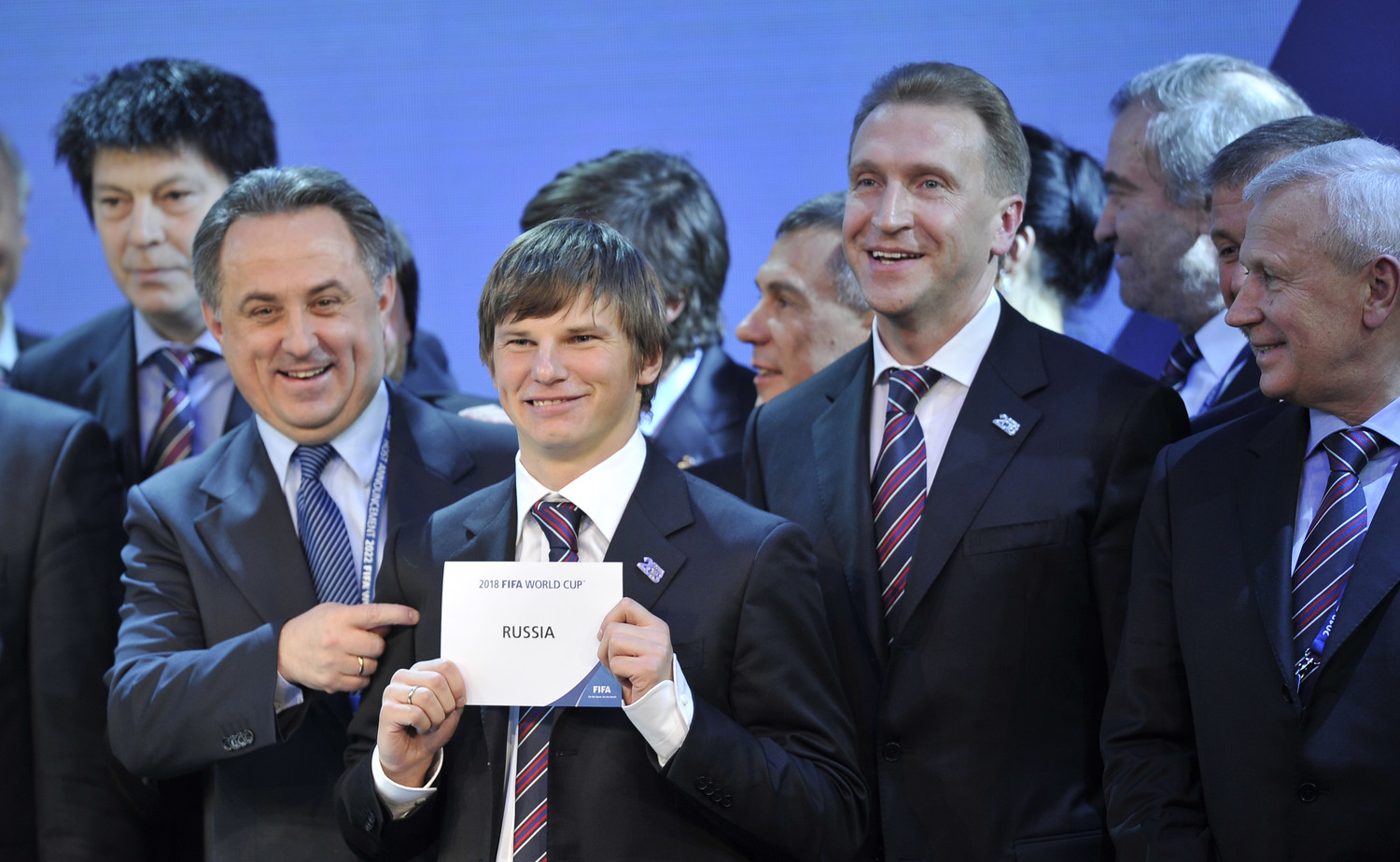
Arshavin (centre, holding the envelope) and others celebrating the winning bid to hold the 2018 World Cup in Russia

On 2 December 2010, Arshavin made a speech during Russia's presentation of its successful bid for the 2018 World Cup.

== Personal life ==
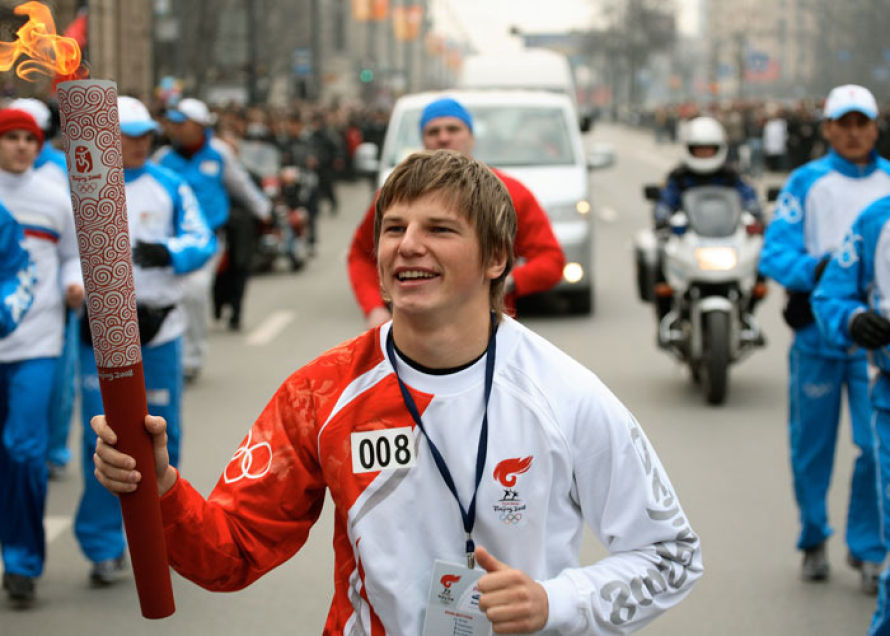
Arshavin with the torch of the 2008 Summer Olympics

Arshavin carried the Olympic Flame during the St. Petersburg leg of the torch relay for the 2008 Summer Olympics.

Arshavin and his former wife Julia Baranovskaya met in 2003. They have three children, two sons named Artyom and Arseniy and a daughter named Yana. In September 2016, he married his second wife, Alisa Arshavina, with whom he shares a daughter. After a year of marriage, the couple reportedly divorced.

Post retirement, he continues to support his former clubs. In 2025, Fabrizio Romano reported that Arshavin obtained his UEFA A coaching license.

=== Politics ===
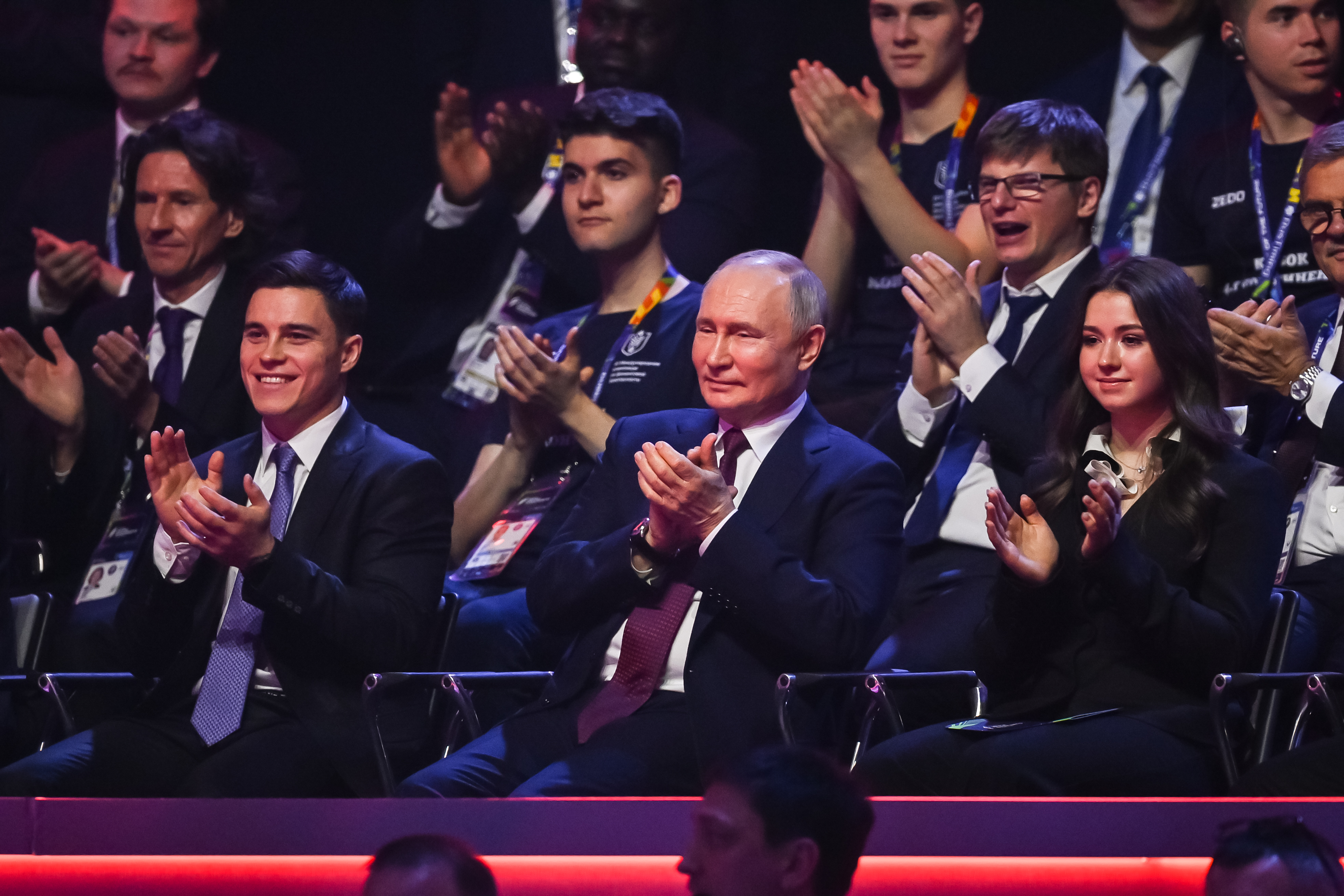
Arshavin sitting next to Vladimir Putin at the opening ceremony of Russia's "Games of the Future" on 21 February 2024

Arshavin participated in the elections on 11 March 2007 as a candidate for deputy of the Legislative Assembly of Saint Petersburg from the United Russia party. He won as a part of the party list but later abandoned the mandate.

On 6 February 2012, Arshavin was one of 499 cultural, technical or sporting figures personally chosen in debates as campaign ambassadors for Russian presidential candidate Vladimir Putin in the buildup to the 2012 Russian presidential election.

== Career statistics ==
=== Club ===
Appearances and goals by club, season and competition
Club	Season	League			National cup (Note: Includes Russian Cup, FA Cup, Kazakhstan Cup)		League cup (Note: Includes Football League Cup)		Continental		Other		Total	
Club	Season	Division	Apps	Goals	Apps	Goals	Apps	Goals	Apps	Goals	Apps	Goals	Apps	Goals
Zenit	2000	Russian Top Division	10	0	1	0	—		3	0	—		14	0
Zenit	2001	Russian Top Division	29	4	2	0	—		—		—		31	4
Zenit	2002	Russian Premier League	30	4	3	1	—		4 (Note: Appearances in UEFA Cup)	2	—		37	7
Zenit	2003	Russian Premier League	27	5	2	0	—		—		—		29	5
Zenit	2004	Russian Premier League	28	6	1	0	—		8	4	—		37	10
Zenit	2005	Russian Premier League	29	9	4	2	—		8	3	—		41	14
Zenit	2006	Russian Premier League	28	7	4	0	—		5	2	—		37	9
Zenit	2007	Russian Premier League	30	10	5	1	—		6	2	—		41	13
Zenit	2008	Russian Premier League	27	6	0	0	—		14	2	2 (Note: One appearance and one goal in Russian Super Cup, one appearance in UEFA Super Cup)	1	43	9
Zenit	Total		238	51	21	4	—		49	15	2	1	310	71
Arsenal	2008–09	Premier League	12	6	3	0	0	0	—		—		15	6
Arsenal	2009–10	Premier League	30	10	1	0	0	0	8 (Note: Appearances in UEFA Champions League)	2	—		39	12
Arsenal	2010–11	Premier League	37	6	5	0	4	1	6	3	—		52	10
Arsenal	2011–12	Premier League	19	1	1	0	2	1	5	0	—		27	2
Arsenal	2012–13	Premier League	7	0	0	0	2	1	2	0	—		11	1
Arsenal	Total		105	23	10	0	8	3	21	5	—		144	31
Zenit (loan)	2011–12	Russian Premier League	10	3	1	0	—		—		—		11	3
Zenit	2013–14	Russian Premier League	21	2	1	0	—		11	2	1 (Note: Appearance in Russian Super Cup)	0	34	4
Zenit	2014–15	Russian Premier League	14	1	2	1	—		5 (Note: Four appearances in UEFA Champions League, one appearance in UEFA Europa League)	0	—		21	2
Zenit	Total		45	6	4	1	—		16	2	1	0	66	9
Kuban Krasnodar	2015–16	Russian Premier League	8	0	1	0	—		—		—		9	0
Kairat	2016	Kazakhstan Premier League	28	8	5	1	—		4 (Note: Appearances in UEFA Europa League)	2	—		37	11
Kairat	2017	Kazakhstan Premier League	25	7	4	1	—		4	2	1 (Note: Appearance in Kazakhstan Super Cup)	0	34	10
Kairat	2018	Kazakhstan Premier League	31	9	0	0	—		5	0	1	0	37	9
Kairat	Total		84	24	9	2	—		13	5	2	0	108	30
Career total			480	104	45	7	8	3	99	26	5	1	637	141

=== International ===
Appearances and goals by national team and year
National team	Year	Apps	Goals
Russia	2002	2	0
Russia	2003	1	1
Russia	2004	4	2
Russia	2005	9	4
Russia	2006	7	2
Russia	2007	10	1
Russia	2008	8	5
Russia	2009	9	1
Russia	2010	7	0
Russia	2011	10	0
Russia	2012	8	1
Russia	Total	75	17

Scores and results list Russia's goal tally first, score column indicates score after each Arshavin goal.

List of international goals scored by Andrey Arshavin
No.	Date	Venue	Opponent	Score	Result	Competition
1	13 February 2003	Tsirion Stadium, Limassol, Cyprus	Romania (Note: Romania "B" fielded a team based on reserve players. The game was considered unofficial by the Romanian Football Federation)	3–1	4–2	Friendly
2	9 October 2004	Stade Josy Barthel, Luxembourg, Luxembourg	Luxembourg	2–0	4–0	2006 World Cup qualification
3	13 October 2004	Estádio José Alvalade, Lisbon, Portugal	Portugal	1–4	1–7	2006 World Cup qualification
4	30 March 2005	A. Le Coq Arena, Tallinn, Estonia	Estonia	1–0	1–1	2006 World Cup qualification
5	4 June 2005	Petrovsky Stadium, Saint Petersburg, Russia	Latvia	1–0	2–0	2006 World Cup qualification
6	8 June 2005	Borussia Park, Mönchengladbach, Germany	Germany	2–2	2–2	Friendly
7	17 August 2005	Skonto Stadium, Riga, Latvia	Latvia	1–1	1–1	2006 World Cup qualification
8	7 October 2006	Dynamo Stadium, Moscow, Russia	Israel	1–0	1–1	Euro 2008 qualification
9	15 November 2006	Skopje City Stadium, Skopje, Republic of Macedonia	Macedonia	2–0	2–0	Euro 2008 qualification
10	8 September 2007	Lokomotiv Stadium, Moscow, Russia	Macedonia	2–0	3–0	Euro 2008 qualification
11	4 June 2008	Wacker Arena, Burghausen, Germany	Lithuania	2–1	4–1	Friendly
12	18 June 2008	Tivoli-Neu, Innsbruck, Austria	Sweden	2–0	2–0	Euro 2008
13	21 June 2008	St. Jakob-Park, Basel, Switzerland	Netherlands	3–1	3–1	Euro 2008
14	11 October 2008	Signal Iduna Park, Dortmund, Germany	Germany	1–2	1–2	2010 World Cup qualification
15	15 October 2008	Lokomotiv Stadium, Moscow, Russia	Finland	3–0	3–0	2010 World Cup qualification
16	14 October 2009	Tofik Bakhramov Stadium, Baku, Azerbaijan	Azerbaijan	1–0	1–1	2010 World Cup qualification
17	29 February 2012	Parken Stadium, Copenhagen, Denmark	Denmark	2–0	2–0	Friendly

== Honours ==
Zenit Saint Petersburg

- Russian Premier League: 2007, 2011–12, 2014–15
- Russian Super Cup: 2008
- UEFA Cup: 2007–08
- UEFA Super Cup: 2008
- Russian Cup runner-up: 2001–02

Arsenal

- Football League Cup runner-up: 2010–11

Kairat

- Kazakhstan Cup: 2017; runner-up: 2016
- Kazakhstan Super Cup: 2017

Russia

- UEFA European Championship bronze medal: 2008

Individual

- Ballon d'Or sixth place: 2008, nominee: 2009
- Premier League Player of the Month: April 2009
- Footballer of the Year in Russia (Futbol): 2006
- Footballer of the Year in Russia (Sport-Express): 2006
- Baltic and Commonwealth of Independent States Footballer of the Year: 2007, 2008, 2009
- Russian Premier League top assist provider: 2007
- ADN Eastern European Footballer of the Season: 2008
- UEFA European Championship Team of the Tournament: 2008
- UEFA European Championship top assist provider: 2012
- UEFA Cup Final Man of the Match: 2008
- Kazakhstan Premier League Player of the Month: July 2016, September 2016, August 2018
- Kazakhstan Premier League Team of the Year: 2017
- Kazakhstan Premier League Left Winger of the Year: 2018
- Kazakhstan Player of the Year: 2016
