= Julia Ann Rudolph =

American photographer (c. 1820–1890)

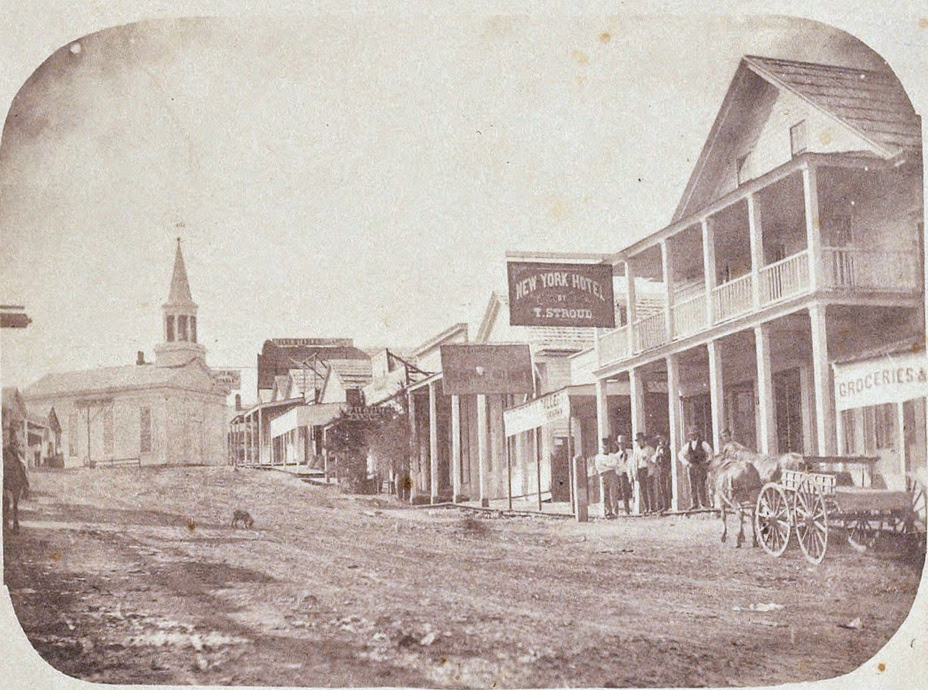
Nevada City c 1856 by Rudolph

Julia Ann Rudolph (also known as Julia Ann Swift and Julia Ann Raymond; c. 1820–1890) was a 19th-century American studio photographer active in both New York and California. At a time when there were very few professional women photographers, her career spanned a remarkable forty years.

== Biography ==
Born around 1820 (the exact date and location are unknown), Julia Ann Swift originally trained to be a teacher, earning her certificate in Litchfield, Connecticut, in 1839. By 1852, however, she was working in the Utica, New York, daguerreotype studio of Daniel DeWitt Tompkins Davie, remaining there for three years. She married sometime before 1855 and began working under the name Julia Ann Raymond.

By early 1856, she had moved to Nevada City, California, where she set up her own studio in premises formerly occupied by the photographer George O. Kilbourn, which she advertised as having "all the latest instruments and chemicals." Her studio burned down a few months after she set up shop, but she reopened down the street within a couple of months. Rudolph specialized in studio portraits, but she also took some street scenes. She printed her images as daguerreotypes, ambrotypes, and tintypes that were mounted on leather or paper. In 1857, an engraving based on her ambrotype of Edward Matteson was published in Hutchings' Illustrated California Magazine.

For a time towards the end of 1856, she reverted to using her birth name; the date of her divorce is unknown, but in December of that year she remarried. Her second husband, James Ferdinand Rudolph, was a pharmacist, and she began using the name Julia Ann Rudolph in her business dealings.

Rudolph stayed in Nevada City for four years before moving her business to K Street in Sacramento, where she pursued her career until at least 1890. A record of increasingly higher tax payments suggests that her business flourished. From 1873 on, Rudolph and her husband split their time between Sacramento and Nevada City, and Rudolph operated photographic studios in both cities for a time. In 1890, Rudolph and her husband moved to Philadelphia, Pennsylvania, where she died of consumption.

== Collections ==
Rudolph's photographs are held in the following public collections:

- Beinecke Rare Book & Manuscript Library, Yale University
- California State Library, Sacramento
- Women in Photography International Archive, Arcata, California
