= Rudolph III =

Rudolph III or Rudolf III may refer to:

- Rudolf III of Burgundy (971–1032), last king of the independent Kingdom of Arles
- Rudolph III, Count of Neuchâtel (died 1272), son of Count Berthold
- Rudolph III of Austria (c. 1281 – 1307), or Rudolf I of Bohemia
- Rudolf III, Margrave of Baden-Baden (d. 1332)
- Rudolf III, Duke of Saxe-Wittenberg (c. 1373 – 1419), a member of the House of Ascania and Elector of Saxony
- Rudolf III, Margrave of Hachberg-Sausenberg (1343–1428)
