= Rudolf Robert Maier =

German pathologist

Rudolf Robert Maier (9 April 1824 – 7 November 1888) was a German pathologist who was a native of Freiburg im Breisgau.

He studied medicine at the University of Freiburg, where one of his instructors was orthopedist Louis Stromeyer (1804–1876). He furthered his medical training in Vienna with Carl Rokitansky (1804–1878), Joseph Hyrtl (1810–1894) and Josef Skoda (1805–1881), and in Würzburg under Rudolf Virchow (1821–1902). Afterwards, he returned to Freiburg, where in 1859 he became an associate professor. He later attained a full professorship, and in 1864 founded the first institute of pathological anatomy at Freiburg.

With Adolf Kussmaul (1822–1902), Maier provided the first comprehensive description of periarteritis nodosa, a condition sometimes referred to as "Kussmaul-Maier disease". The two doctors described their findings in the inaugural edition of the journal Deutsches Archiv für klinische Medicin, a publication co-founded by Friedrich Albert von Zenker (1825–1898) and Hugo Wilhelm von Ziemssen (1829–1902).

He died in 1888 following a massive goiter disease with bronchoconstriction.

== Writings ==
Among Maier's written works were biographical treatises on 16th century physicians, Johannes Schenck von Grafenberg (1530–1598) and Michael Servetus (1511–1553). Other noted writings of his include:

- Über den Bau der Thränenorgane, insbesondere der thränenleitenden Wege. 1 Teil. Thränenorgane des Menschen, Freiburg 1859.
- Über eine bisher nicht beschriebene eigenthümliche Arterienerkrankung (Periarteritis nodosa), die mit Morbus Brightii und rapid fortschreitender, allgemeiner Muskellähmung einhergeht. (About a previously undescribed peculiar arterial disease (periarteritis nodosa), which is associated with Bright's disease and rapidly progressive generalized muscle paralysis (with Adolf Kussmaul); Deutsches Archiv für klinische Medicin, Leipzig 1866; 1: 484–518.
- Lehrbuch der allgemeinen pathologischen Anatomie. (Textbook of general pathological anatomy), Leipzig 1871.

== Associated eponym ==
- "Maier's sinus": A depression in the internal surface of the lacrimal sac.
