= Rudolf Tombo Jr. =

American philologist

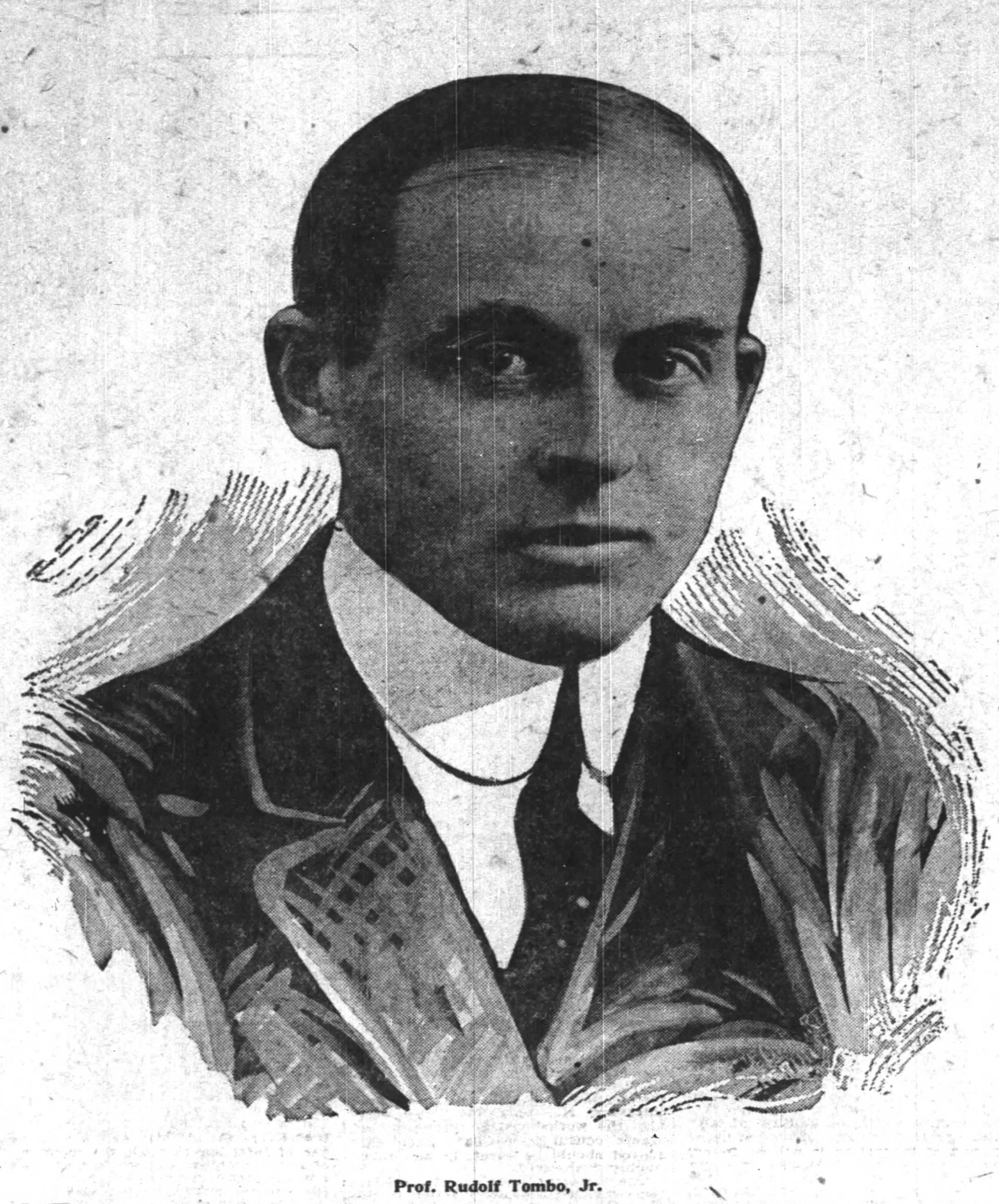
Picture of Rudolf Tombo Jr. printed in The New York Times on December 21, 1913

Rudolf Tombo Jr. (October 24, 1875 – May 21, 1914) was a German-born American philologist who was associate professor of Germanic languages at Columbia University.

== Biography ==
Rudolf Tombo Jr. was born in Barmen, Germany, on October 24, 1875. His father, Rudolf Tombo Sr, was a graduate of the University of Rostock and an instructor in German. As a child Tombo Jr. accompanied his family to the United States, where his father held positions at Columbia University.

Tombo Jr. enrolled at the City College of New York in 1891, graduating with honors in 1895. After two years in business, Tombo Jr. entered Columbia University, earning his Master of Arts in 1898. He was given a Master of Science in 1899, and earned a Doctor of Philosophy in 1901.

Tombo Jr. was appointed an instructor at Columbia University in 1900. He was registrar at Columbia University from 1902 to 1908, when he became secretary of the Alumni Council and began his work of organizing Columbia's alumni. Tombo Jr. resigned his secretaryship in 1911, becoming associate professor of Germanic languages at Columbia University and director of the Deutsches Haus at Columbia. He was simultaneously secretary of the Germanistic Society and editor of The Germanistic Society Quarterly. Tombo Jr. was also a prominent member of Theta Delta Chi. He was well known for his abilities both as a lecturer and administrator.

Tombo Jr.'s first publication was Ossian in Germany (1901). He edited several textbooks along with his father and made many translations.

Tombo Jr. married Adelaide Cooper, a student at Barnard College in 1901, with whom he had a daughter, Marion. The marriage ended in a divorce in 1911, and in 1913 Tombo Jr. married Lorraine Bowes.

In the winter of 1914, Tombo Jr. was named as one of the candidates for the presidency of the College of the City of New York. He fell ill with pneumonia in March 1914, of which he died at his home on May 21, 1914.
