= Rudolph III of Neuchâtel =

Rudolph IV, Count of Neufchâtel
- Died: 1272
- Noble family: House of Neufchâtel
- Spouse: Sibylle of Montbéliard
- Father: Berthold, Count of Neufchâtel
- Mother: Richezza

Rudolph IV, Count of Neufchâtel (died 1272) was a son of Count Berthold and his first wife, Richezza.

Rudolph married Sibylle, a daughter of Count Theodoric III of Montbéliard and had the following children:

- Amadeus, his successor
- Henry, baron of Thièle
- John provost of Neufchâtel, baron of Hasenburg
- Richard, a canon
- Agnelette
- Margaret, married a Lord of Blenay

Rudolph III of Neuchâtel House of Neufchâtel Died: 1272
Preceded by Berthold	Count of Neufchâtel; 1233–1272	Succeeded by Amadeus
