= Rudolph II (disambiguation) =

Rudolph II usually refers to Rudolf II, Holy Roman Emperor (1552–1612).

Rudolph II or Rudolf II may also refer to:

- Rudolph II of Burgundy (died 937), king of Upper Burgundy, Lower Burgundy, and Italy
- Rudolf II, Margrave of the Nordmark (d. 1144)
- Rudolph II, Count of Habsburg (died 1232), Count of Habsburg
- Rudolph II, Count Palatine of Tübingen (died 1247), Count Palatine of Tübingen and Vogt of Sindelfingen
- Rudolf II, Duke of Austria (1270–1290), the youngest son of King Rudolph of Habsburg and Gertrude of Hohenburg
- Rudolf II, Margrave of Baden-Baden (d. 1295)
- Rudolf II, Margrave of Hachberg-Sausenberg (1301–1352)
- Rudolf II, Count Palatine of the Rhine (1306–1353), Count Palatine of the Rhine
- Rudolf II, Duke of Saxe-Wittenberg (c. 1307–1370), member of the House of Ascania
