= Rudolf I =

Rudolf I may refer to:

- Rudolf I (bishop of Würzburg) (died 908)
- Rudolph I of Burgundy (859–912)
- Rudolf I, Margrave of the Nordmark (d. 1124)
- Rudolph I, Count Palatine of Tübingen (1160–1219)
- Rudolph I, Bishop of Schwerin (died 1262)
- Rudolf I, Margrave of Baden-Baden (1230–1288)
- Rudolf I of Germany (1218–1291)
- Rudolf I, Duke of Bavaria (1274–1319)
- Rudolf I of Bohemia, (c. 1281 – 1307)
- Rudolf I, Margrave of Hachberg-Sausenberg (died 1313)
- Rudolf I, Duke of Saxe-Wittenberg, (c. 1284 – 1356)
- Rudolf II, Holy Roman Emperor (1552–1612), who was also Rudolf I of Hungary
