= Rudolph IV of Neuchâtel =

Ruler of Neuchâtel from 1288 to 1343

Rudolph IV (French: Rodolphe IV; also known as Rollin IV) was Lord and Count of Neuchâtel from 1288 until his death in 1343.

== Biography ==
A member of the House of Neuchâtel, Rudolph was the son of Amadeus, co-lord of Neuchâtel, and Jordane of La Sarraz, Dame of Belmont. He is first mentioned in 1288, at the time of his father's death, when he lost his imperial immediacy and received his lands as a fief from John I of Chalon-Arlay. In 1290, Rudolph concluded an offensive alliance with Fribourg directed against the lords of Valangin, who he defeated at the Battle of Coffrane in 1296, later destroying their fort in La Bonneville in 1301. He married Eléonore of Savoy, daughter of Louis I, Baron of Vaud, in 1294.

Rudolph was titled Lord of Neuchâtel until 1296, when he recovered the title of count. He became baillif of Vaud, his father-in-law's territory, around 1300, and entered into a Burgrecht with Bern in 1308. Rudolph extended his influence to Boudevilliers and Vaumarcus. He founded the town of Le Landeron in 1328–1329, consolidating Neuchâtel's border with the Prince-Bishopric of Basel. Rudolph died in 1343 and was succeeded by his son, Louis.
