= Gothic cathedrals and churches =

Overview of building classification

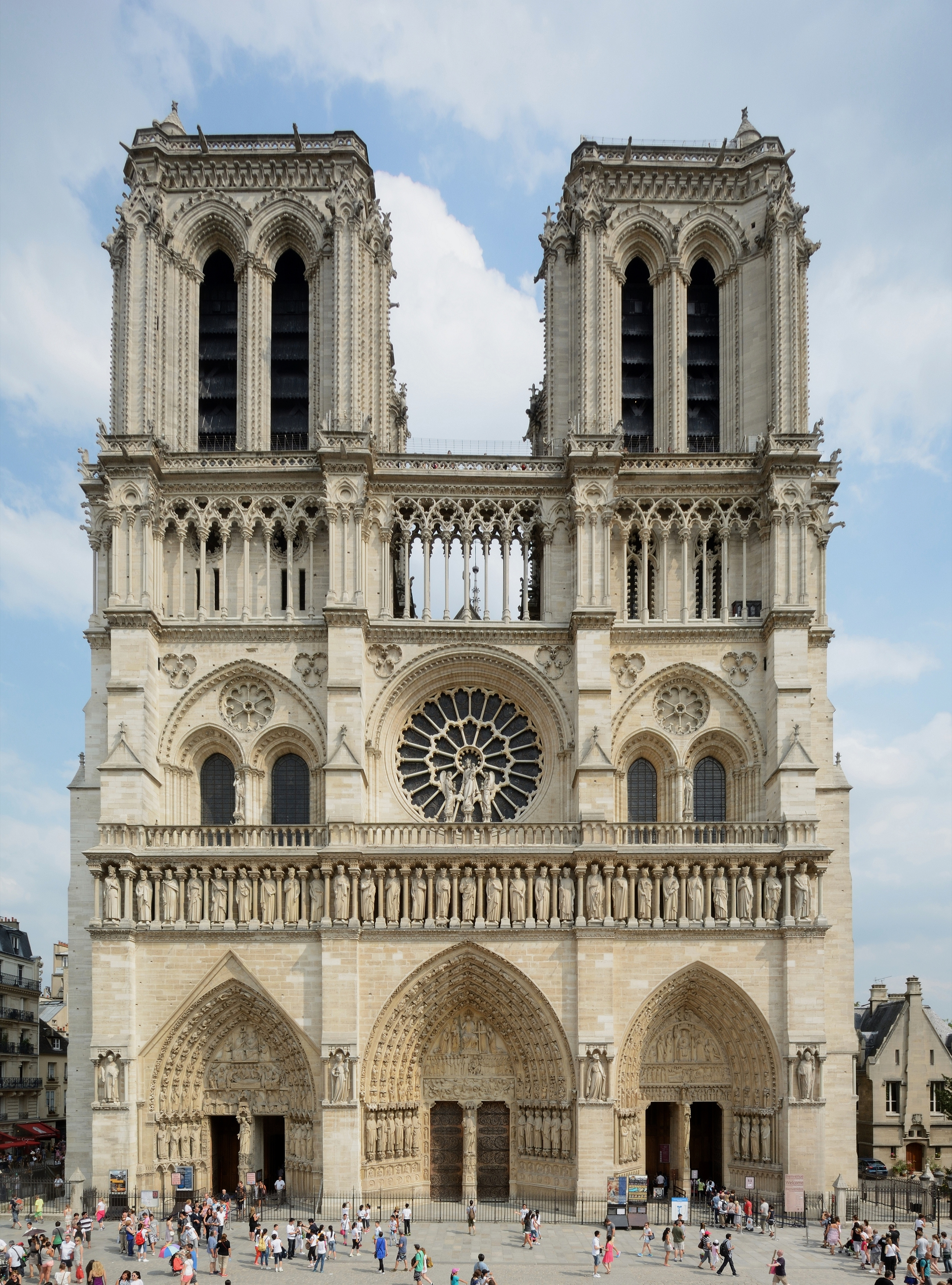
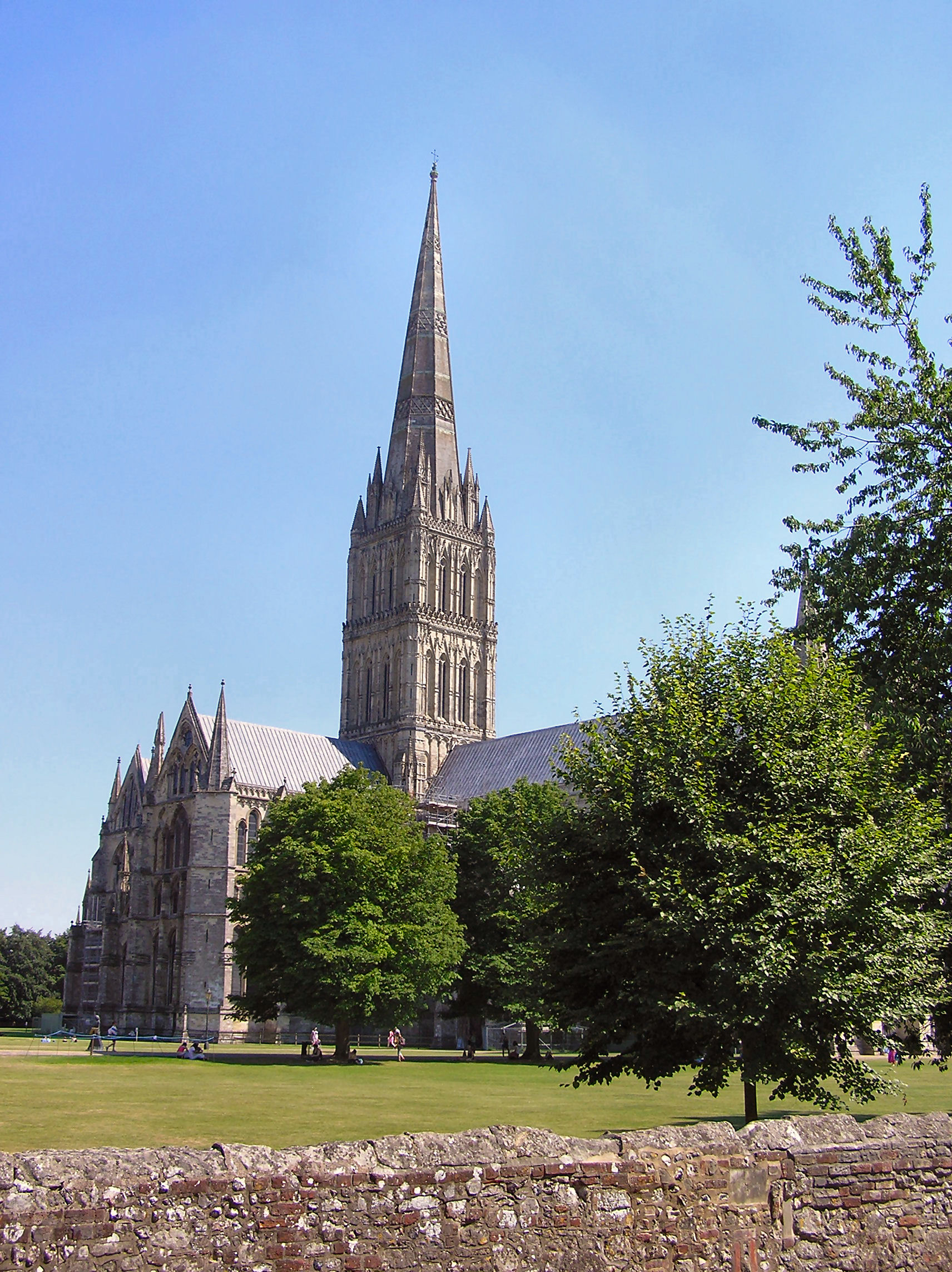
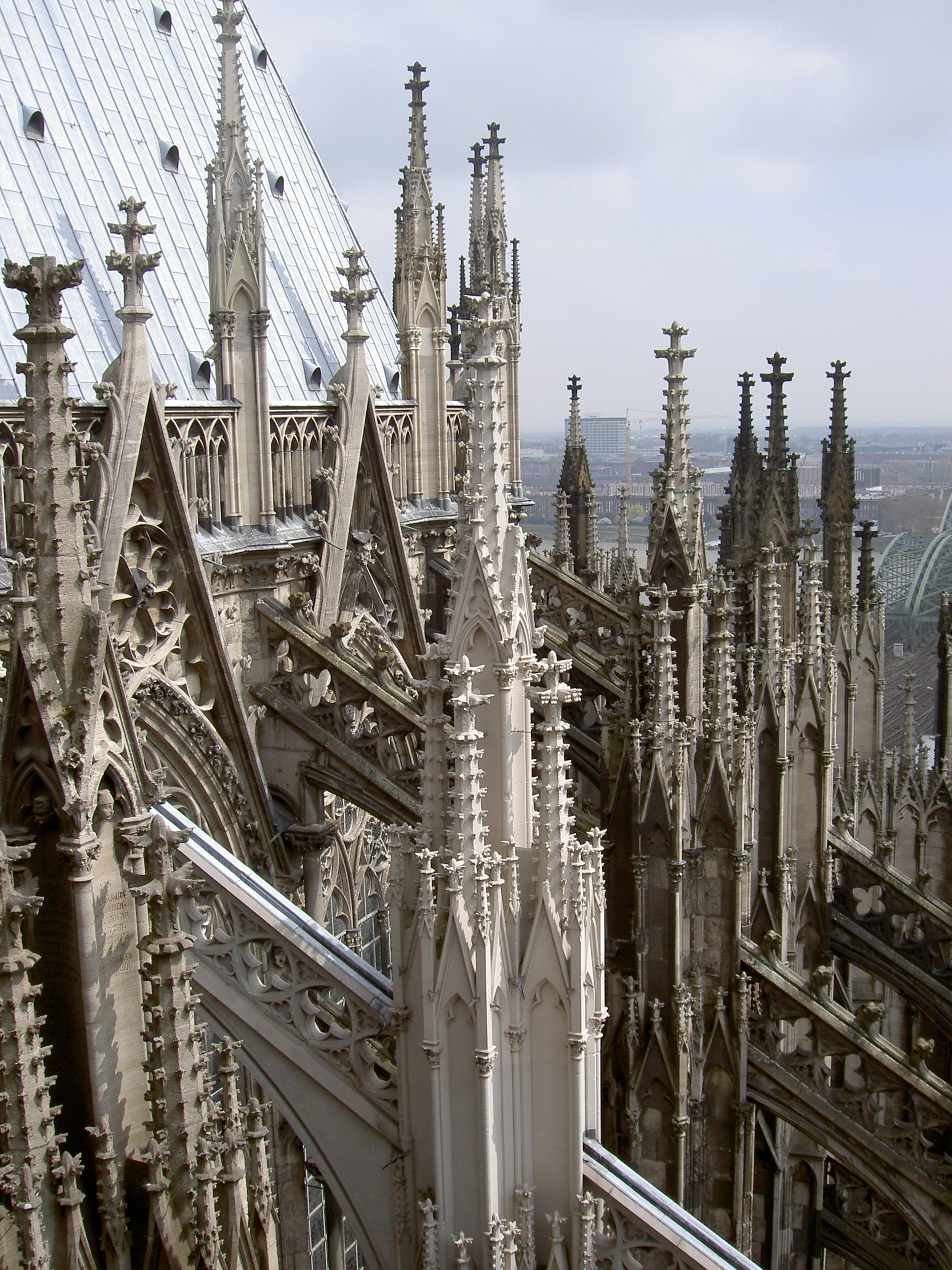
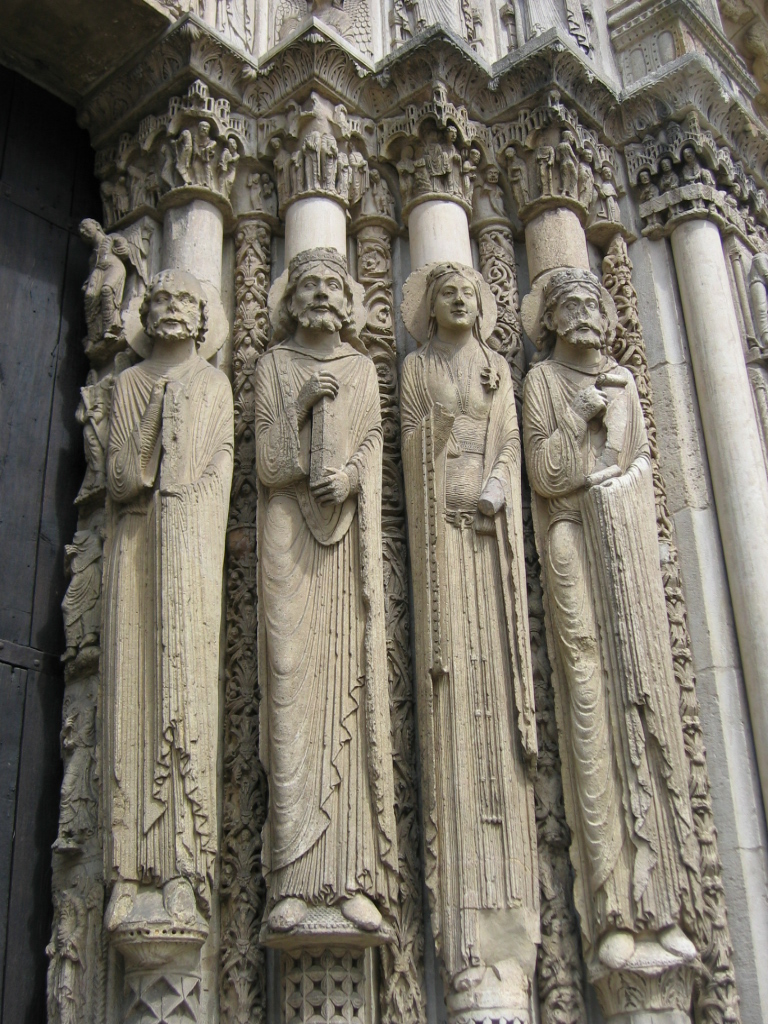
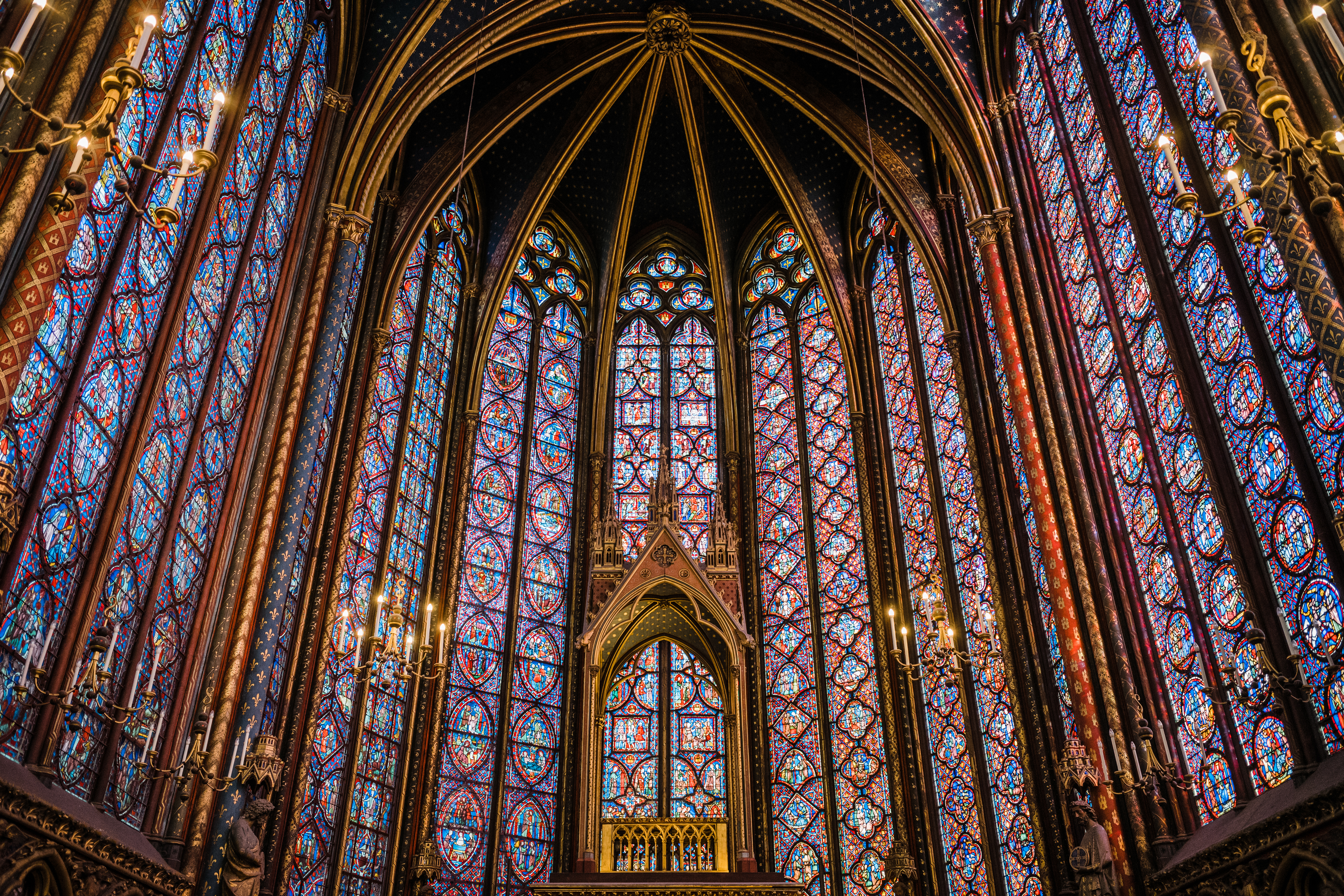
- Top: Notre-Dame de Paris; Salisbury Cathedral: Centre: buttresses of Cologne Cathedral, façade statuary of Chartres Cathedral; Bottom: windows of Sainte-Chapelle, Paris
- Years active: 12th–16th centuries
- Location: Europe

Gothic cathedrals and churches are religious buildings constructed in Europe in Gothic style between the mid-12th century and the beginning of the 16th century. The cathedrals are notable particularly for their great height and their extensive use of stained glass to fill the interiors with light. They were the tallest and largest buildings of their time and the most prominent examples of Gothic architecture. The appearance of the Gothic cathedral was not only a revolution in architecture; it also introduced new forms in decoration, (Note: For examples of "Gothic" decoration, compare: Pugin, Augustus C. (1 November 2012) [1831]. Pugin's Gothic Ornament: The Classic Sourcebook of Decorative Motifs with 100 Plates. Dover Pictorial Archive Series (reprint ed.). Mineola, New York: Dover Publications. ISBN 9780486155425.) sculpture, and art.

Cathedrals were by definition churches where a bishop presided. Abbeys were the churches attached to monasteries. Many smaller parish churches were also built in the Gothic style. The appearance of the great cathedrals in the 12th century represented a response to the dramatic increase of population and wealth in some parts of Europe and the need for larger and more imposing buildings for worship. Technical advances, such as innovative uses of the pointed arch, rib vault and flying buttress, allowed the churches and cathedrals to become much taller and stronger, with larger windows and more light.

The Gothic style first appeared in France at the Abbey of Saint Denis, near Paris, with the rebuilding of the ambulatory and west façade of the abbey church by the Abbot Suger (1135–40). The first Gothic cathedral in France, Sens Cathedral, was begun between 1135 and 1140 and consecrated in 1164.

The first cathedral built outside France in Gothic style, in 1167, is the Ávila Cathedral in Spain, a country where the style spread very quickly, with other early examples such as the Cuenca Cathedral in 1182 and some of the best examples of the style worldwide, such as the Toledo Cathedral (1226), the most beautifully decorated, or Seville Cathedral (1402), the largest ever erected.

The style also appeared in England, where it was initially called simply "the French style". After fire destroyed the choir of Canterbury Cathedral, a French master builder from Sens, William of Sens, rebuilt it between 1174 and 1184. Other elements of the style were imported from Caen in Normandy by French Norman architects, who also brought finely-cut stones from Normandy for their constructions.

Notre-Dame Cathedral was begun in 1163 and consecrated in 1177. The later part of the 12th century and beginning of the 13th century saw a more refined style, High Gothic, characterised by Chartres Cathedral, Reims Cathedral, and Amiens Cathedral. A third period, called Rayonnante in France, was more highly decorated, as characterised by Sainte Chapelle (1241–1248) and Amiens Cathedral in France. The fourth and final Gothic period, called Flamboyant, appeared in the second half of the 14th century, and took its name from the flame-like motifs of decoration. Sainte-Chapelle de Vincennes (1370), with its walls of stained glass, offers a good example.

Renaissance cathedrals and churches gradually replaced Gothic cathedrals, and the original cathedrals, such as Notre Dame, experienced many modifications or fell into ruin (in the Low Countries, however, the Brabantine Gothic persisted until far into the 17th century). However, in the mid-19th century, in large part due to the 1831 novel Notre Dame de Paris, better known in English as The Hunchback of Notre-Dame, by Victor Hugo, there was a new wave of interest in the Gothic cathedral. Many Gothic cathedrals and churches were restored, with greater or lesser accuracy.

== Terminology ==
The term "cathedral" came from the Greek cathedra, or "seat", since it was the official seat of the Bishop (French: Évêque), and the principal church of a diocese. His title came from the Greek term Episkopos, meaning "overseer." As the leader of the diocese, the Bishop was considered the direct descendant of the Apostles or disciples of Christ, and had three missions: to direct the affairs of the church within the diocese, to administer the sacraments, and teach the Gospel of Christ, as found in the Bible, and confessed by the Church. The Bishop of a cathedral was assisted by the Canons, or Chanoines in French, who formed a council called the Chapter.

The word church stems from the word chirche from Middle English. This word in turn appears to derive from the Greek word kuriakon. Kuriakon comes from another word kuriakos which means "of, or belonging to, a lord, master".

At its time, Gothic architecture was called the opus Francigenum ('French work'). The term "Gothic" was a negative term invented in the late Renaissance by its critics, including the art historian and architect Giorgio Vasari. They considered the style barbaric, the opposite of the new Renaissance style, which they favored.

== Early Gothic – France (mid-12th century) ==
=== Abbot Suger and St Denis Basilica ===
The Gothic style first appeared in France in the mid-12th century in an Abbey, St Denis Basilica, built by Abbot Suger (1081–1151). The old Basilica was the traditional burial place of Saint Denis, and of the Kings of France, and was also a very popular pilgrimage destination, so much so that pilgrims were sometimes crushed by the crowds. Suger became the abbot of Saint Denis in 1122. He became the friend and confidant of two French Kings Louis VI and Louis VII, and he served as regent for Louis VII during the absence of the King for the Second Crusade (1147–49).

Suger, with the full support of the King, decided to enlarge the church and reconstruct it on a new model. His first modification was a new west façade, inspired in part by new churches in Normandy, with two towers and three deep portals. Each of the portals had a tympanum of sculpture, telling a Biblical or inspiring story. The tympana installed by Sugar depicted the Last Judgement over the main door and the martyrdom of Saint Denis over the other door. The tympana over the east portals became a characteristic feature of later Gothic cathedrals. When the new façade was complete, Suger turned his attention to the choir and the ambulatory in the west of the church.

Suger was also a scholar of the philosophy of Plato, and he believed that light was a way through which the faithful could be elevated from the material to the immaterial and the divine. The ambulatory of the old church was very dark, since Romanesque architecture, with barrel vaults, required thick walls and supporting walls between the small chapels. Suger decided to use a new form of vault, the rib vault, with pointed arches, which was higher and stronger. This allowed him to remove the walls between the chapels, and opened the space for seventy stained glass windows in the choir, filling the church with light.

The new structure was finished and dedicated on 11 June 1144, in the presence of the King. The choir and west front of the Abbey of Saint-Denis both became the prototypes for other buildings in the royal domain of northern France and in the Duchy of Normandy. Through the rule of the Angevin dynasty, the new style was introduced to England and spread throughout France, the Low Countries, Germany, Spain, northern Italy and Sicily. The combination of innovations made Saint-Denis the first important example of Gothic architecture; The church was heavily modified over the following centuries, but the ambulatory and some other original elements remain.

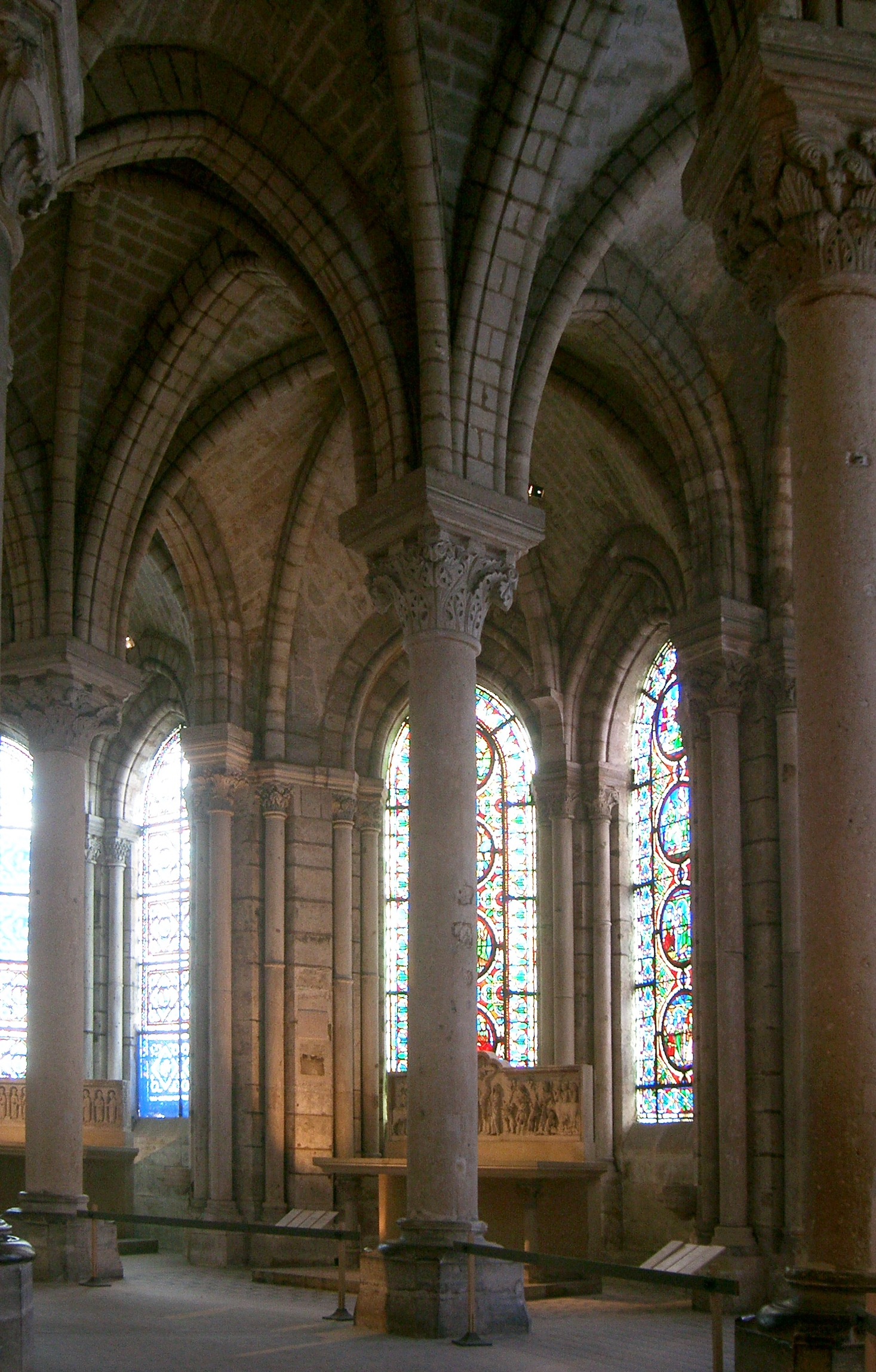
The Gothic ambulatory of the Basilica of Saint-Denis (1140–1144)

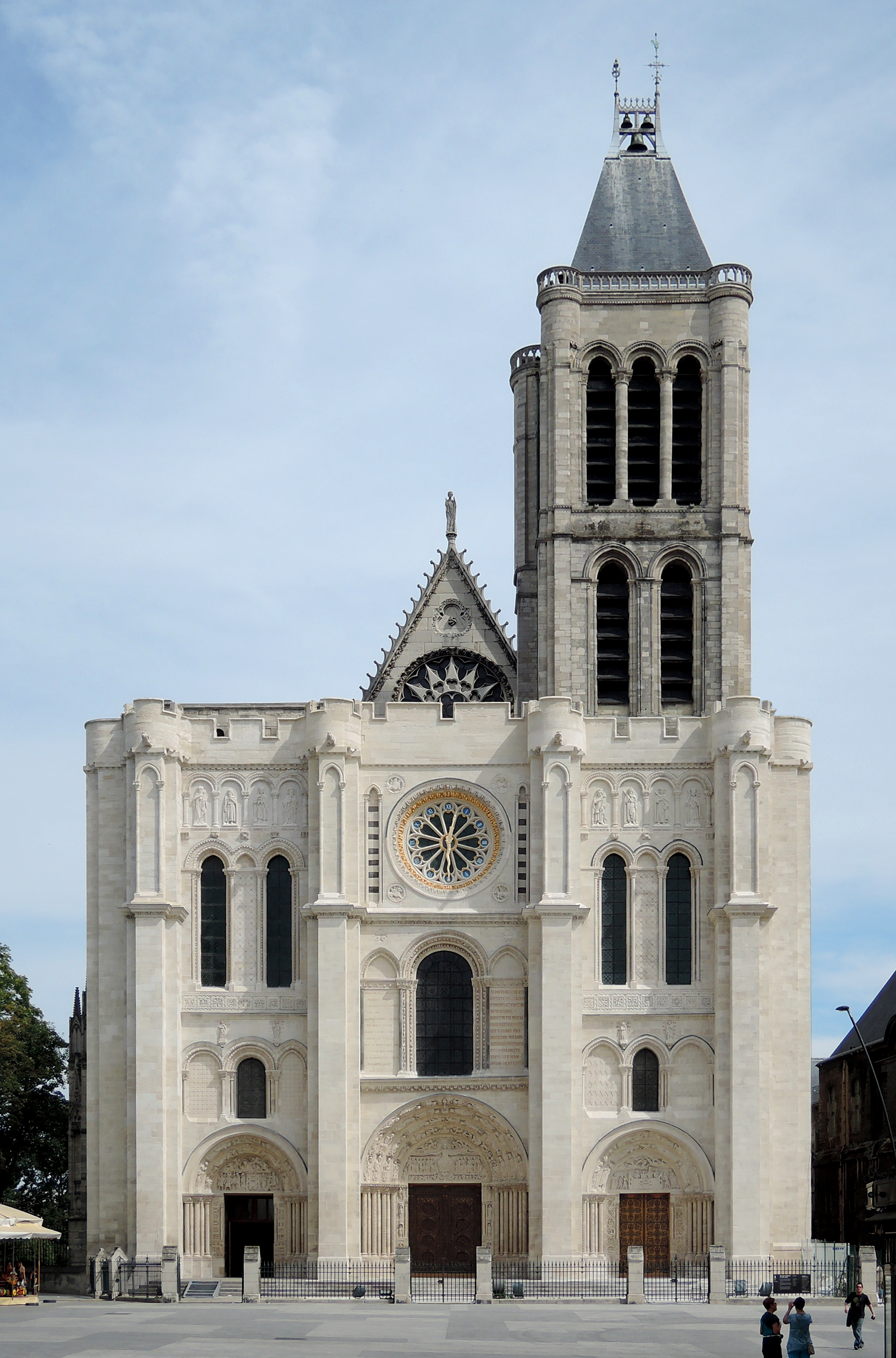
The west façade of the Basilica of Saint-Denis, after restoration. It originally had two towers.(1140–1144)

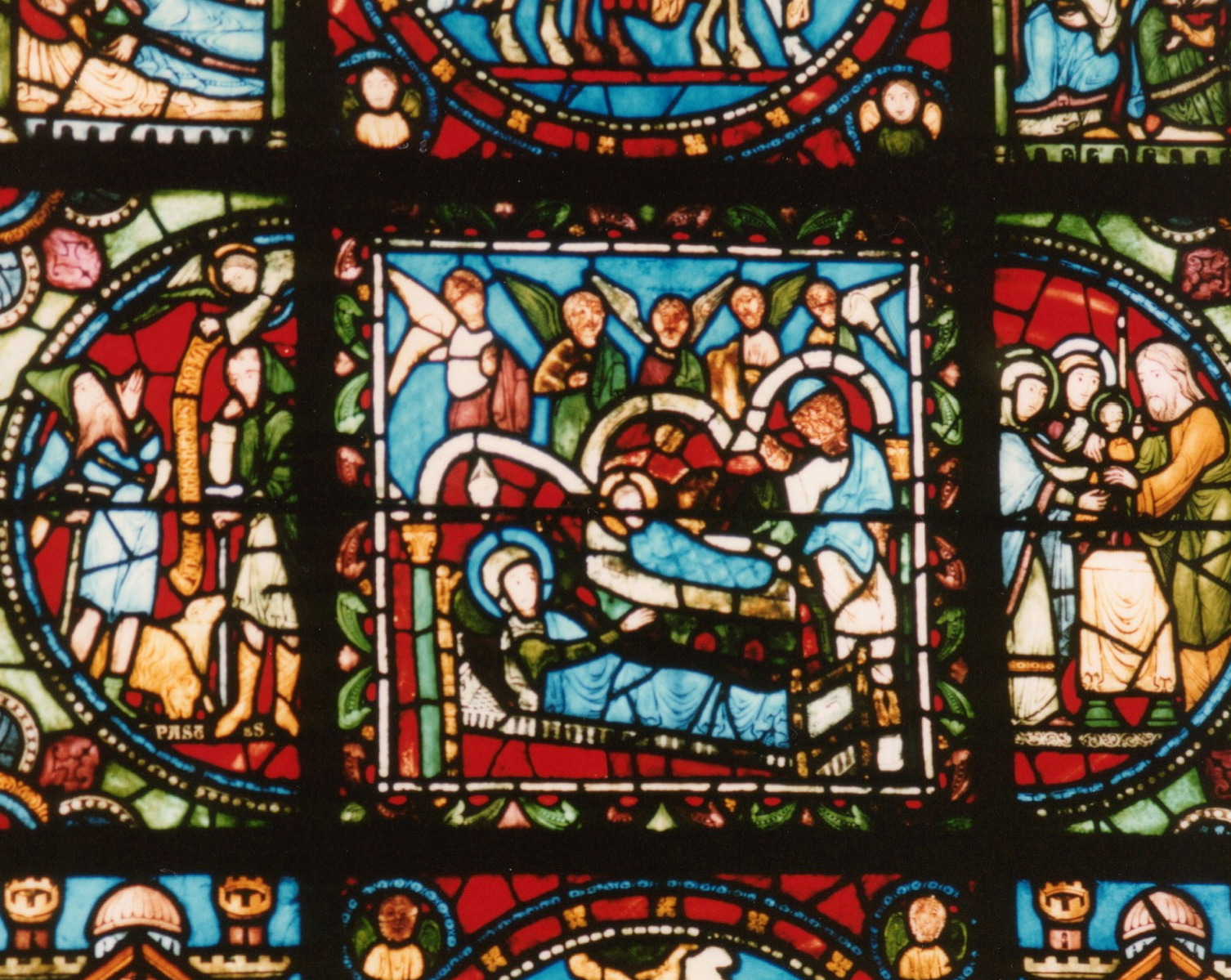
Detail from the 12th-century Life of Christ window

The new features of Saint-Denis were quickly adapted in the construction of new cathedrals in the Ile-de-France. These included Noyon cathedral (begun 1150), Senlis Cathedral begun (1153); Sens Cathedral (begun 1160); and Laon Cathedral (begun 1160). Two were built by Suger's personal friends, the bishops of Noyon and Senlis. The spread of the style was not limited to cathedrals; it also soon appeared in Abbey churches, at St. Leu d'Esserent in Braine, and, in the province of Champagne, at St. Remy in Rheims and Notre-Dame in Chalons-sur-Marne. It also appeared in simple churches, such as the Gothic church of Saint Quiriace in Provins Though each church employed the new style, each had a distinctly different appearance and personality.

- Noyon Cathedral replaced a Romanesque cathedral which burned in 1131. The Bishop of Noyon, Baudouin, used the choir of Saint Denis as his direct model. He used the same masons as Suger, and much of the ornamentation is identical with Saint-Denis. Like many early Gothic churches, the interior has both round and pointed arches, and it has some peculiar Germanic features, such as transepts with rounded ends.
- Sens Cathedral, begun in 1133, had a special place among cathedrals in France as the primate of Gaul, ranking higher than Paris, a title it held through the 16th century. It attracted important medieval religious figures, including Saint Bernard, Abelard and Thomas Becket, who came there in 1164 to appeal to the Pope for support against Henry II of England. It was begun as a Romanesque cathedral, but as the walls were rising, the design was changed to Gothic and the proposed groin vaults replaced by rib vaults. It was completed soon after Saint Denis, and is considered the first Gothic Cathedral in France.
- Senlis Cathedral begun in 1152, was another very early Gothic cathedral built on the model of Saint-Denis by Bishop Thibaut, who had been at the deathbed of Suger. One distinctive feature is the sculpture in the central western portal, which depicts the Death of the Virgin Mary and her Assumption on the lintel, and her Coronation in the tympanum. This arrangement became a common Gothic feature, found at both the north portal of Chartres Cathedral and the northwest tower of Notre Dame de Paris. A major fire in 1504 destroyed the upper vaulting of the original cathedral, and now only the apse, the west façade, and the tower have their original appearance; The exterior is now distinctly flamboyant Gothic.
- Laon Cathedral was begun in about 1160. Like many early Gothic cathedrals, it retained some romanesque features, including tribunes over the side aisles, use of both round and pointed arches, and a two-story chapel on each arm of the transept. Like most early Gothic churches, it was not exceptionally high, but it was exceptionally long, with eleven bays in the nave, and ten in the choir. Because it was not high, it was possible to build a square tower over the crossing of the transept, in addition to four shorter towers on the corners, each with long lancet openings. One curious feature is the sixteen life-sized sculpted oxen on towers, each under its own canopy, symbolizing the animals which hauled the stones to the site.
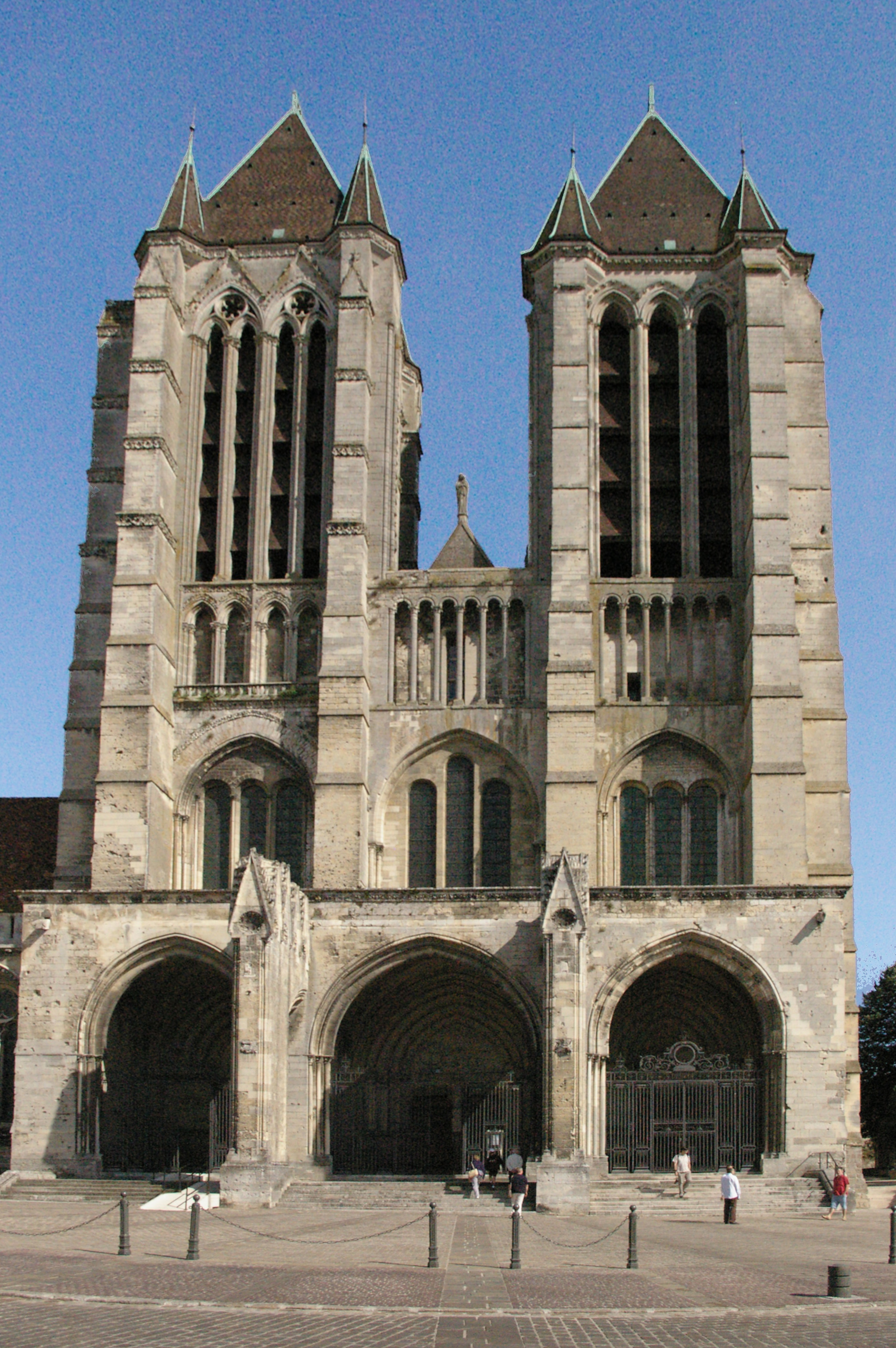
Noyon Cathedral (begun about 1150)

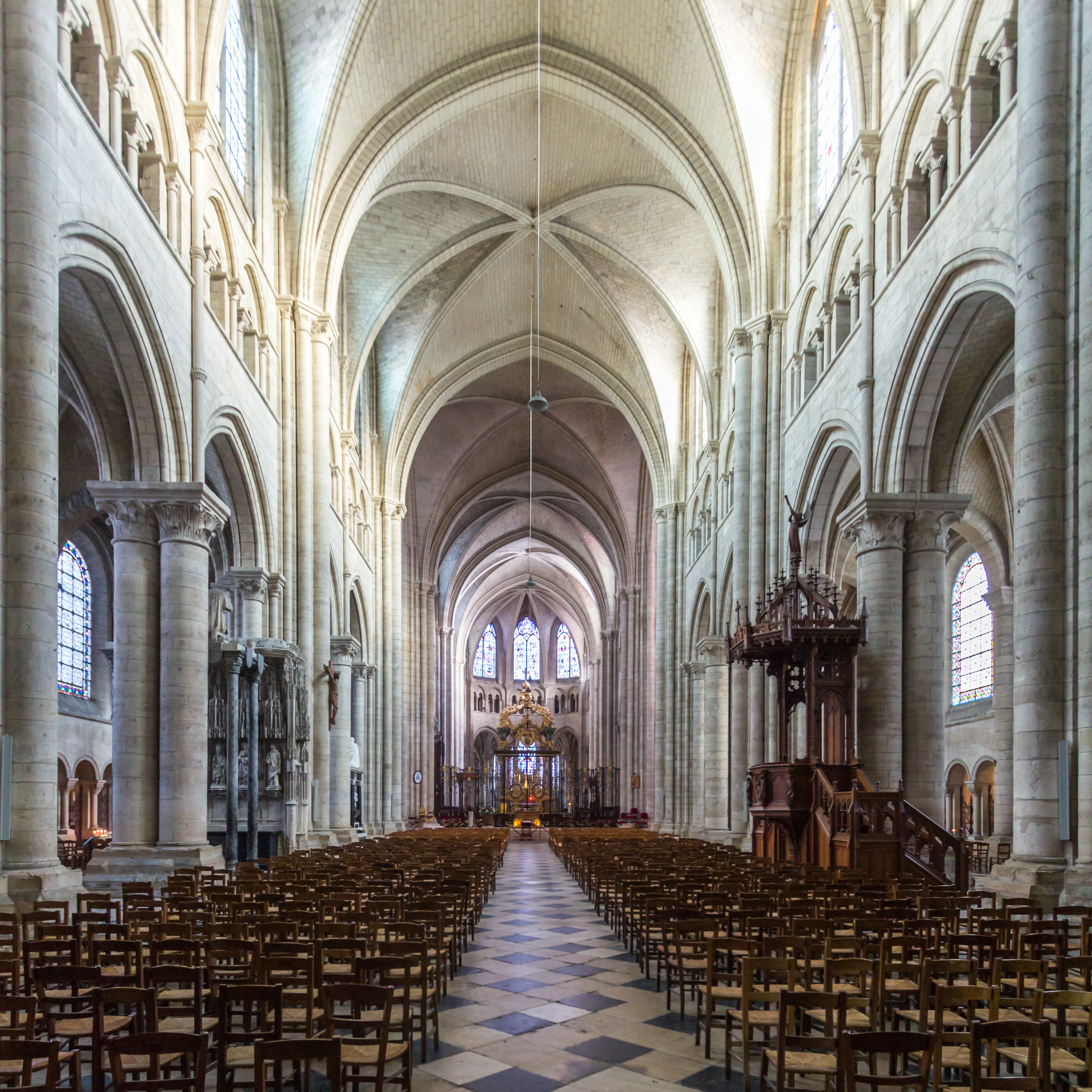
Nave of Sens Cathedral (1140–1164)

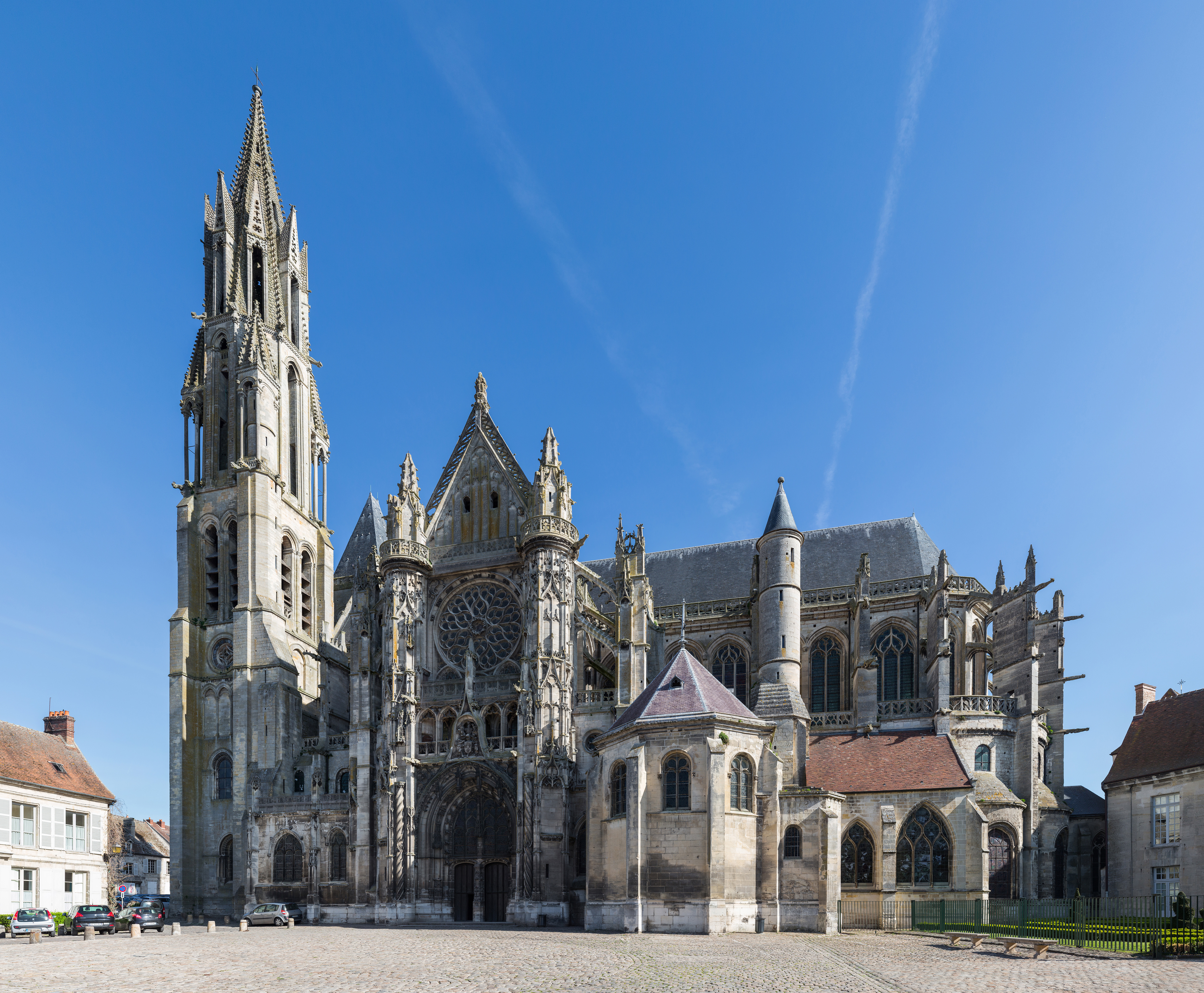
Senlis Cathedral (1153–91): The original 12th-century tower was crowned with an octagonal tower and spire in the 13th century.

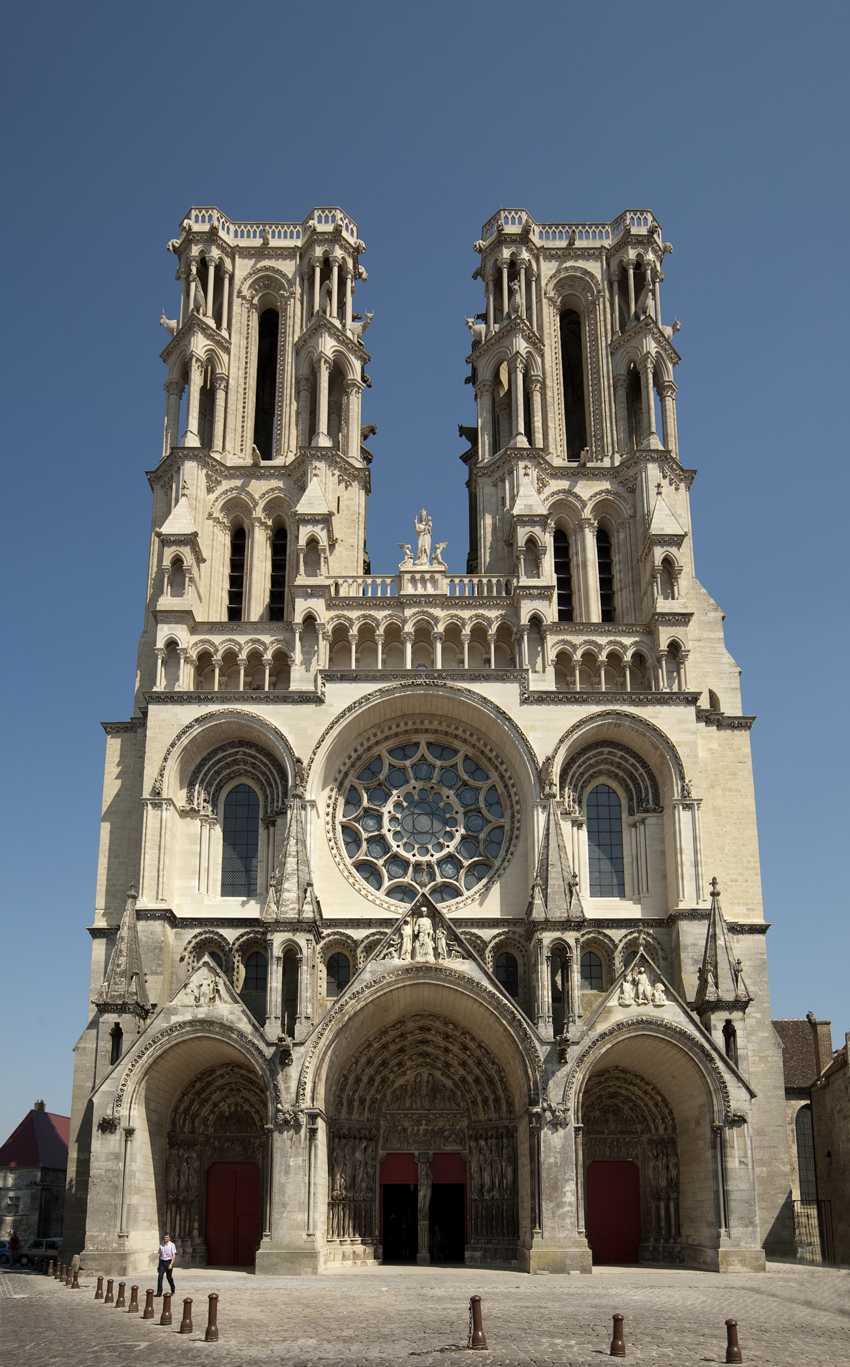
Façade of Laon Cathedral (begun 1160)
- Notre Dame de Paris begun in 1163 by the archbishop Maurice de Sully, was the largest and highest of the new French cathedrals. The nave was 122 meters long and the vaulted ceiling was 35 meters high, twelve meters higher than Laon Cathedral. It used the older six-part rib vault in the ceiling, but replaced the alternating pillars and columns of earlier cathedrals with a single type of pillar, creating greater harmony. It made innovative use of flying buttress to counterbalance the weight of the higher vaults, so the walls could be thinner and have more windows. It had four levels, like the earlier cathedrals, but the old triforium was replaced by small rose windows. Unlike Laon Cathedral, the façade of Notre Dame, with its two towers, expressed a remarkable calm and harmony. Notre-Dame was modified in the later Gothic period, with the addition of the rose windows in the transepts (1250–1260) and double flying buttresses.
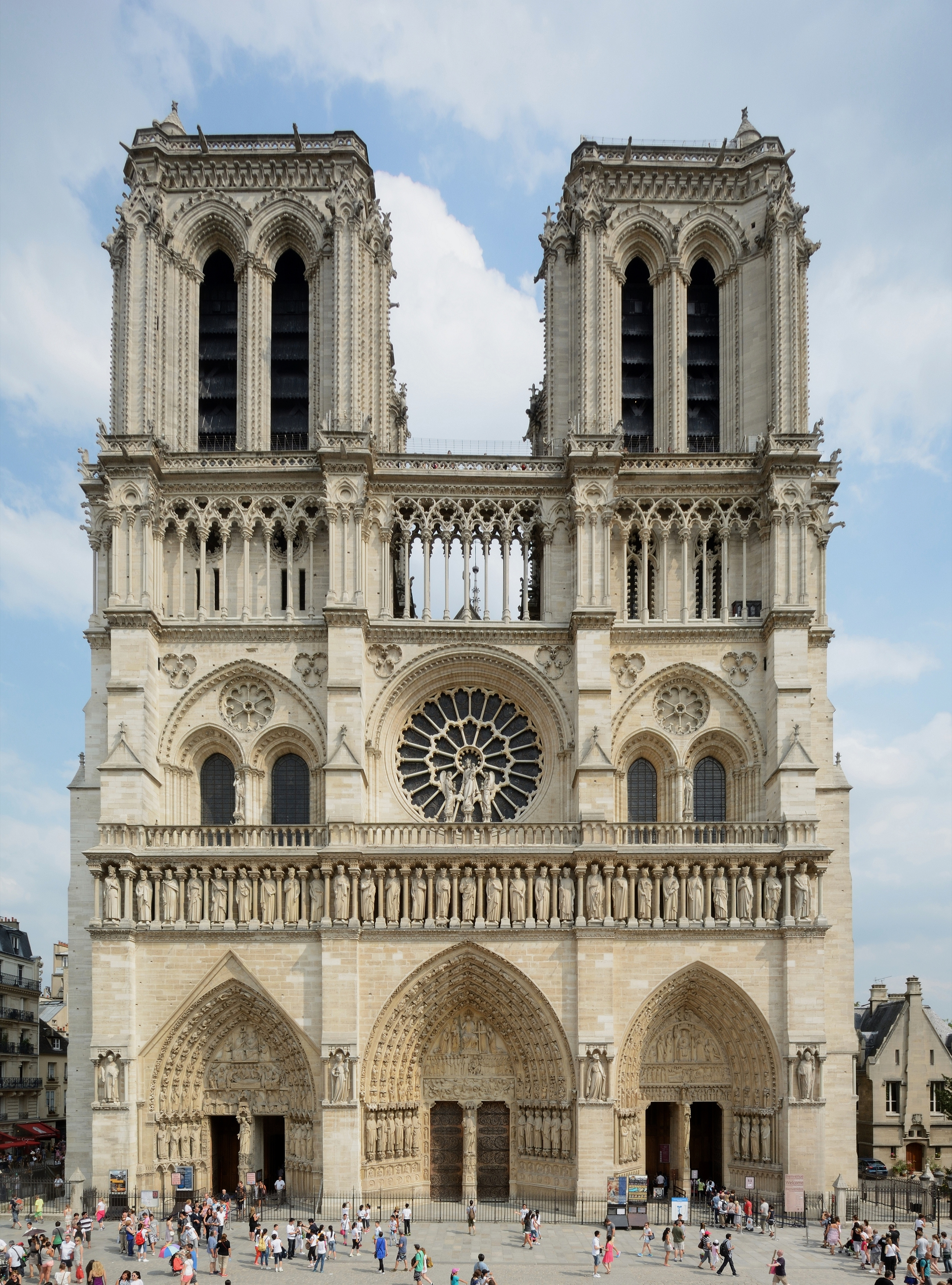
The façade of Notre-Dame de Paris (begun 1163)

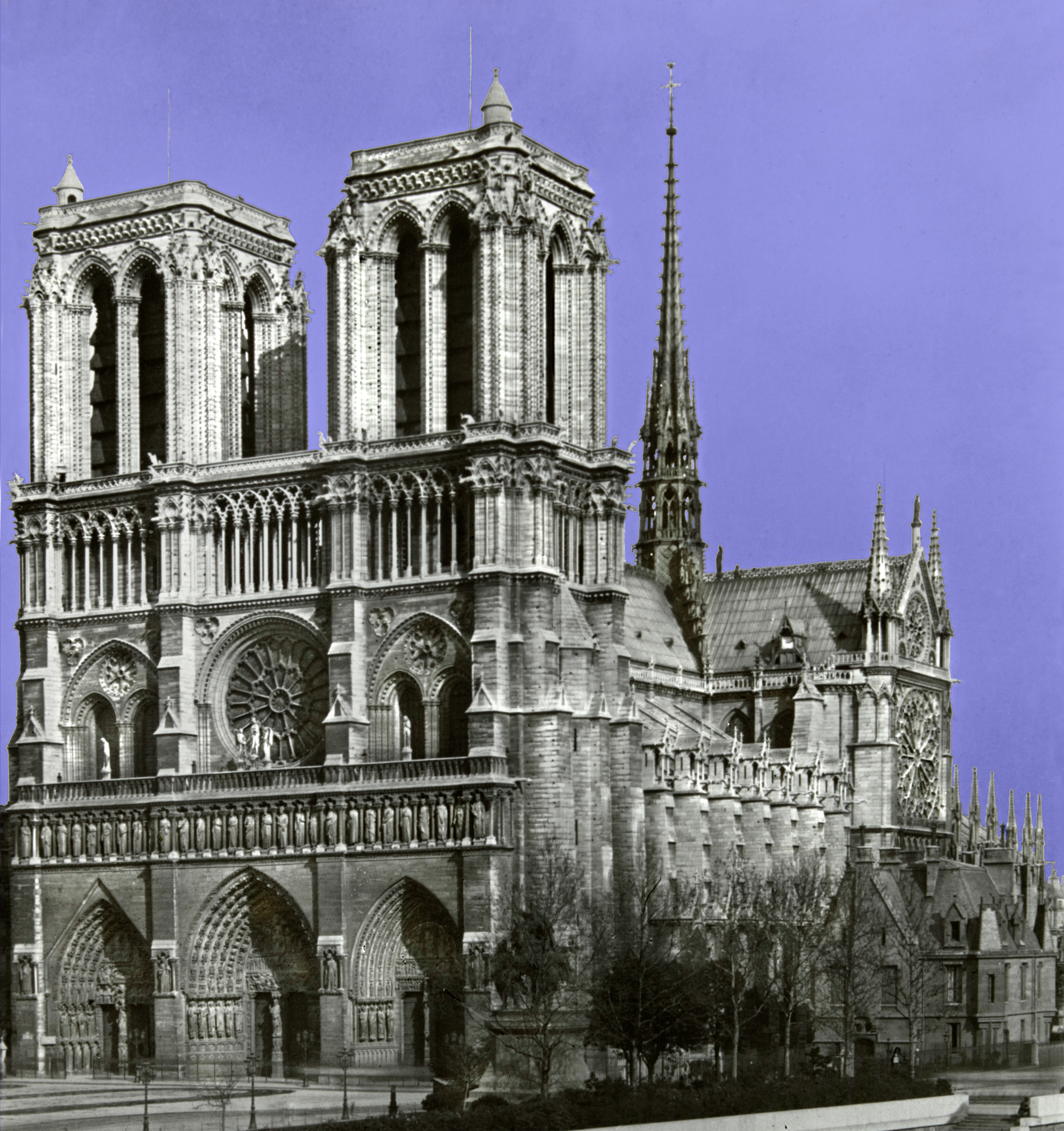
With flèche

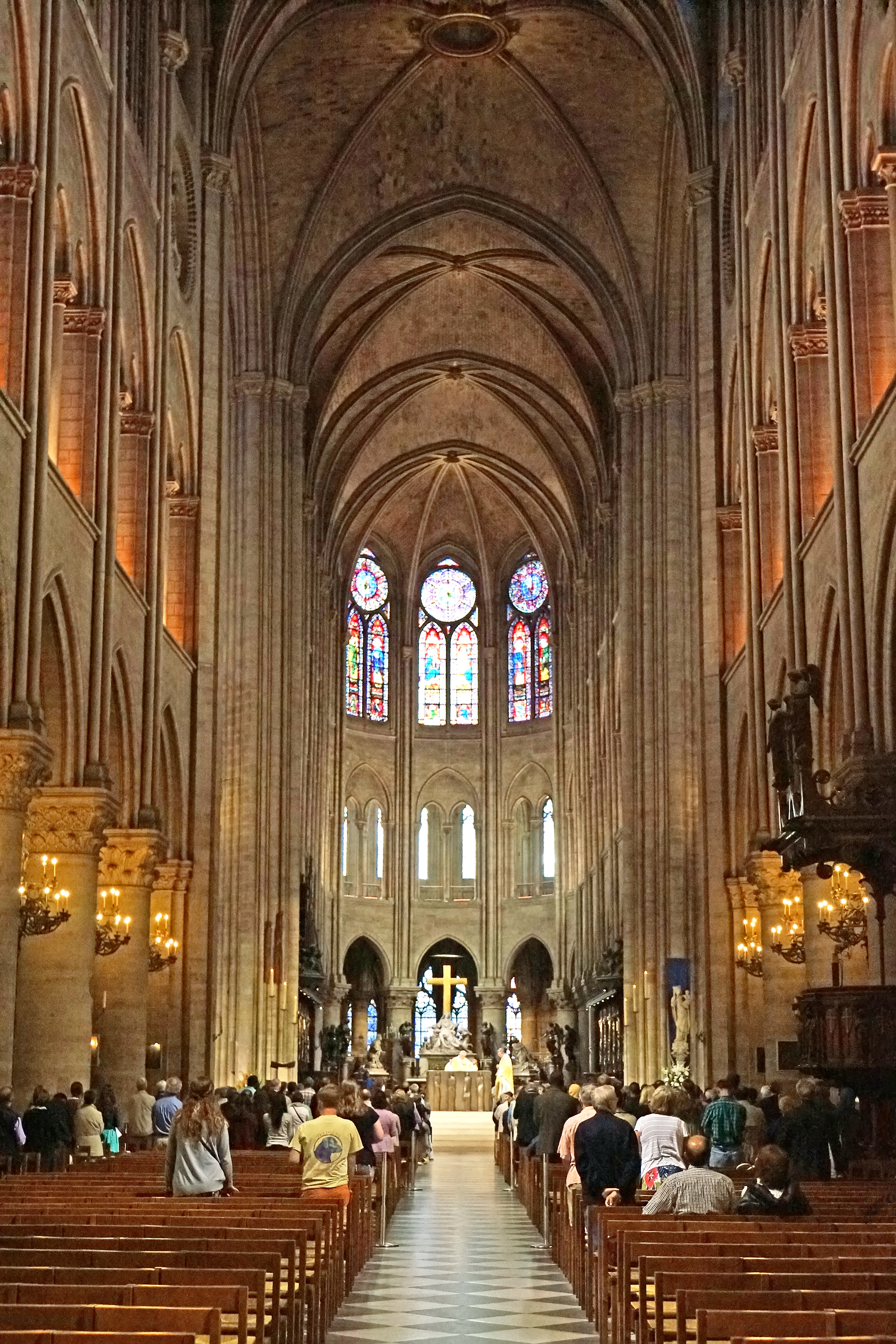
Nave of Notre-Dame de Paris, 122 meters long

== Early Gothic – England ==
Gothic elements, often called "The French style", soon appeared in English cathedrals and abbeys. While English cathedrals tended to follow the French style, they had a few special characteristics of their own. Unlike French cathedrals, they tended toward great length rather than great height. They also made extensive use of Purbeck Marble for columns, floors and wall panels, which added colour and reflection to the interiors. The early English style lasted from the late 12th century to the mid-14th century.

- Canterbury Cathedral (Early Gothic portion – 1174–85) One of the earliest to use Gothic features in the French way was Canterbury Cathedral. Following a fire in 1174 which destroyed much of the choir, a French master builder, William of Sens, who probably had participated in the construction of Sens Cathedral, was selected to conduct the reconstruction. It was rebuilt between 1174 and 1184. William of Sens himself fell fifty feet from the scaffolding and was seriously injured, and had to return to France, where he died in 1180. It was completed by an English builder, William the Englishman. While the choir is not as high as some French cathedrals, it makes up for the difference by its dramatic length. The choir is 180 ft (55 m) long and 71 ft (22 m) high.

The nave and much of the rest of the cathedral were rebuilt into the perpendicular style beginning in the late 14th century. The new transepts and aisles were given the more decorative Lierne vault, where ribs were connected to each other for decorative rather than structural effect. The crossing tower was begun in 1433, and is 237 ft (72 m) high. Alterations to the Cathedral continued until 1834.

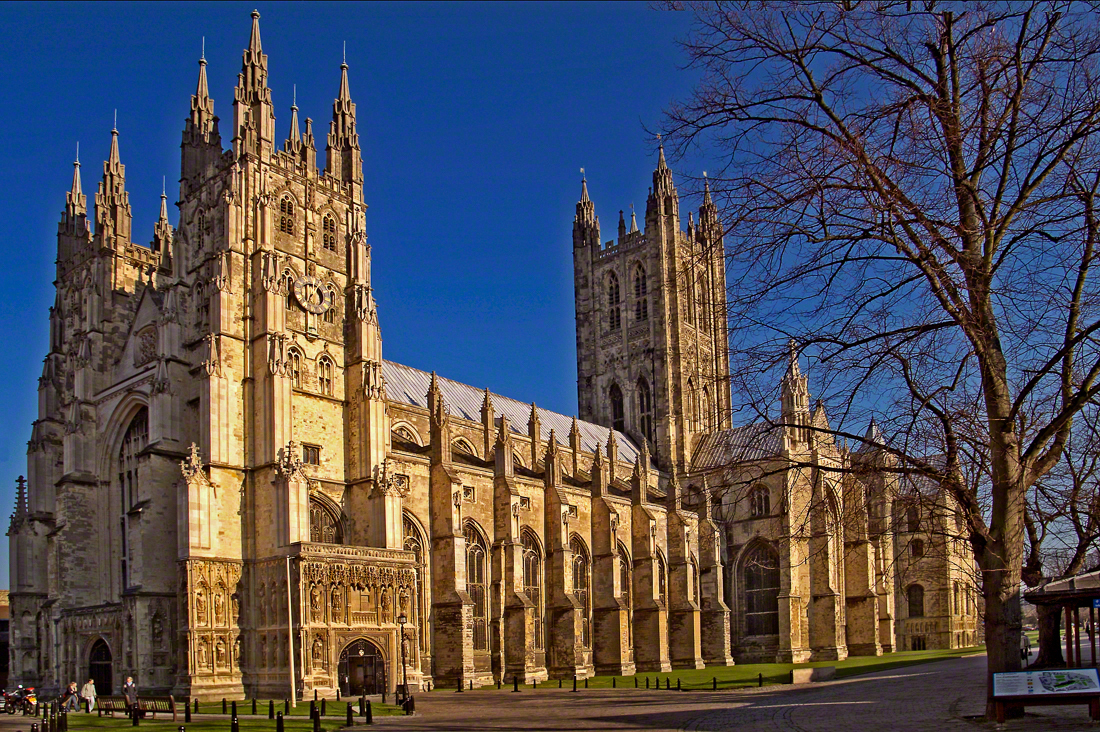
Canterbury Cathedral (1174–1834) The exterior was largely rebuilt into the perpendicular style in the 14th and 15th centuries.

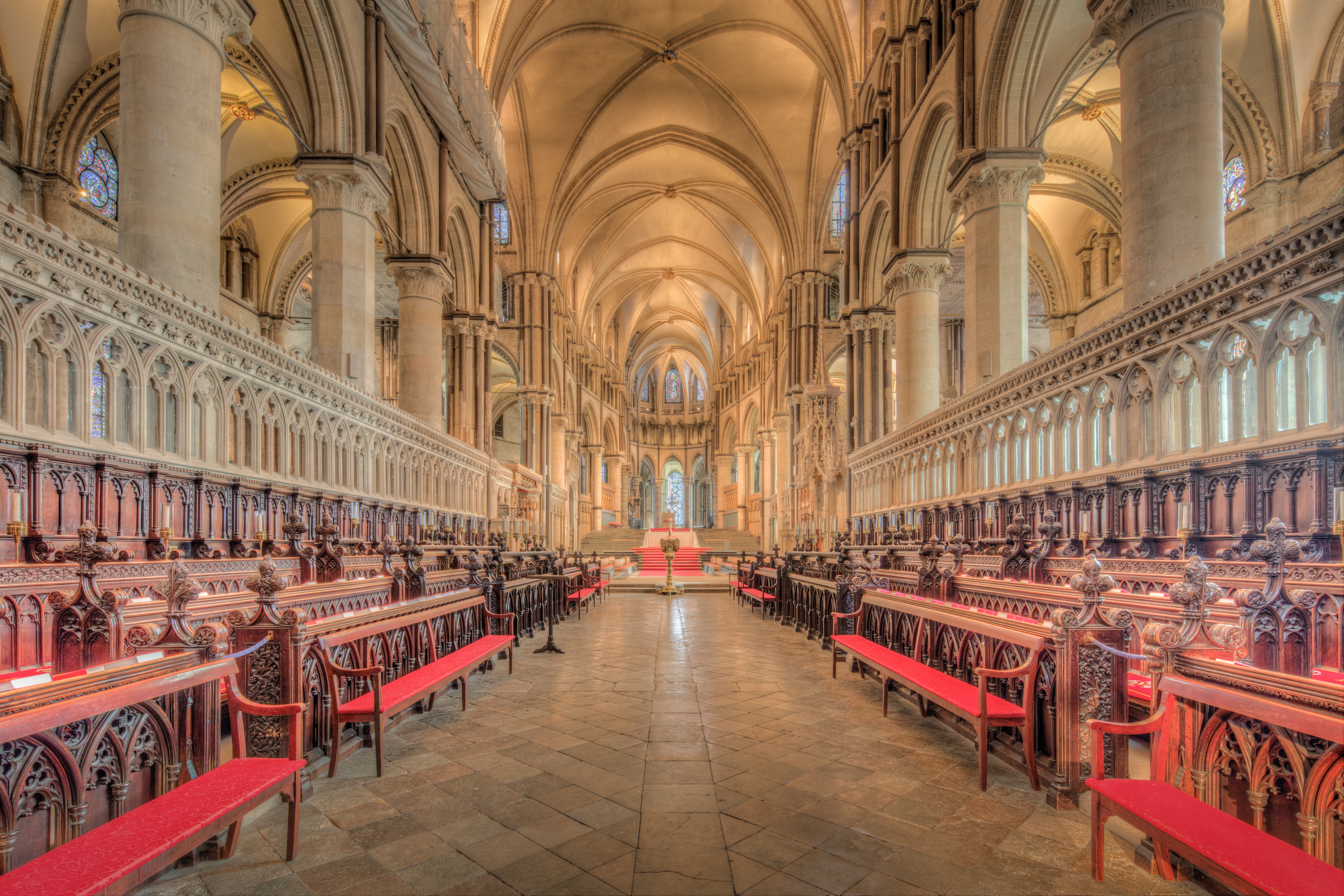
Choir of Canterbury Cathedral by William of Sens (1174–84). (The lower arcades and stalls are a later addition)
- Lincoln Cathedral (1192–1400) took on a Gothic form when it was rebuilt after a disastrous earthquake in 1185. The builders made use of the Gothic rib vault in constructing the new nave and choir. Two rose windows, called the Bishops's Eye and the Dean's Eye, were added at about the same time. The original cathedral had two towers on the west façade, and then a central tower was built in the 14th century, topped by a wooden spire, which made it the tallest structure in the world for two hundred years. The other two towers were also given spires and raised in height. The great spire fell during a windstorm and was not replaced.
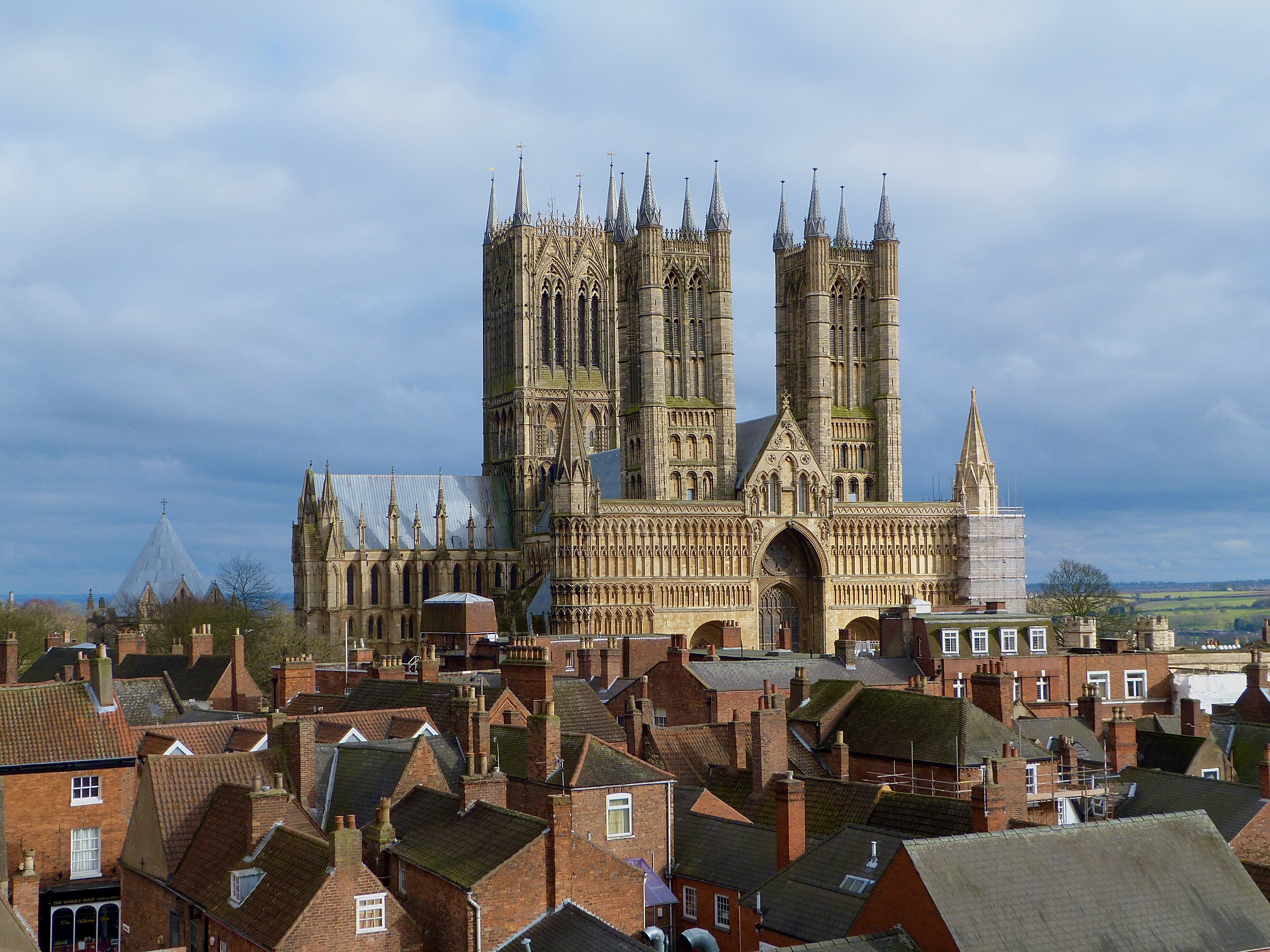
Lincoln Cathedral (1192–1225)

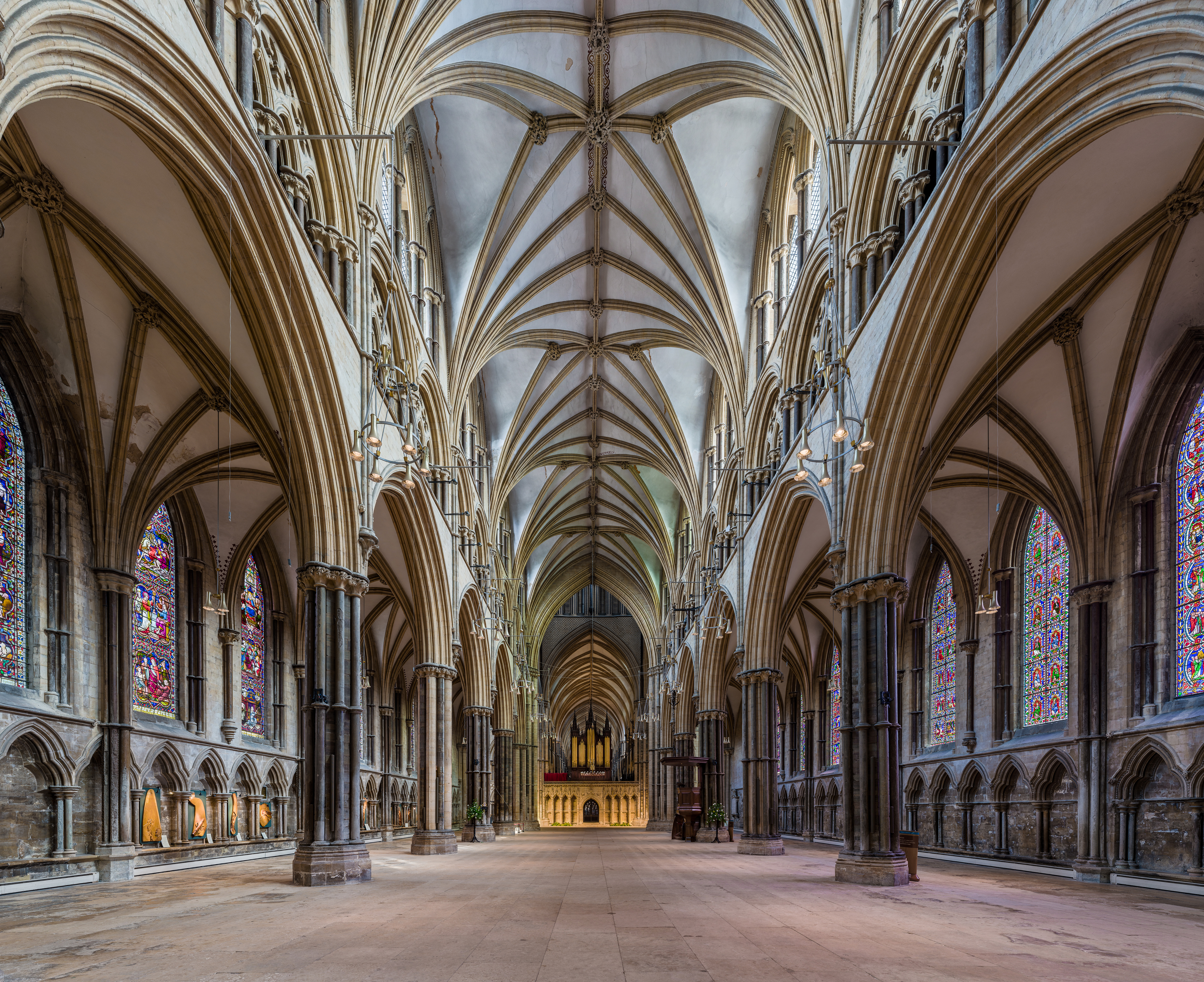
The elaborate vaults of the nave were added in the late 12th and 13th century.
- Salisbury Cathedral was begun in 1220. Its chief patron was William Longespée, the 3rd Earl of Salisbury, who was recognized as a son by Henry II of France. He was sent by the King on missions to France, and was prisoner there for a time, and was familiar with the new French style. The king provided timber for the cathedral from Ireland and from his estates. Longsword was buried in the cathedral in 1226. The body of the cathedral was completed by September 1258. The west front, cloisters and chapter house were complete by about 1275.

The most famous feature of Salisbury Cathedral was added later, between 1300 and 1320, when it was given the tallest spire in England – 123 m (404 ft). The cathedral received another innovation in 1386: the first clock in England that struck the hours.

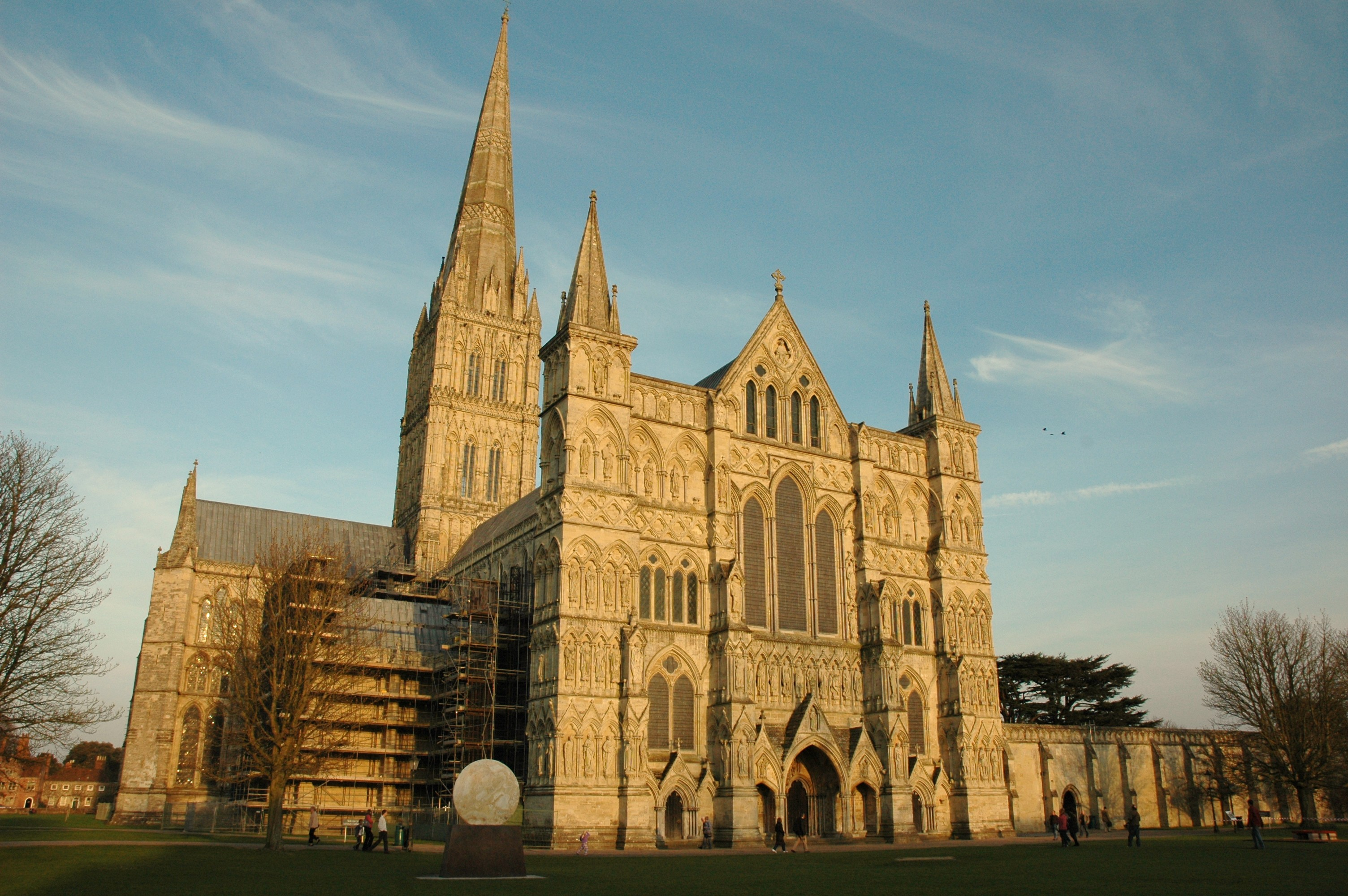
The west front of Salisbury Cathedral (1220–1258). (Spire from 1300 to 1320)

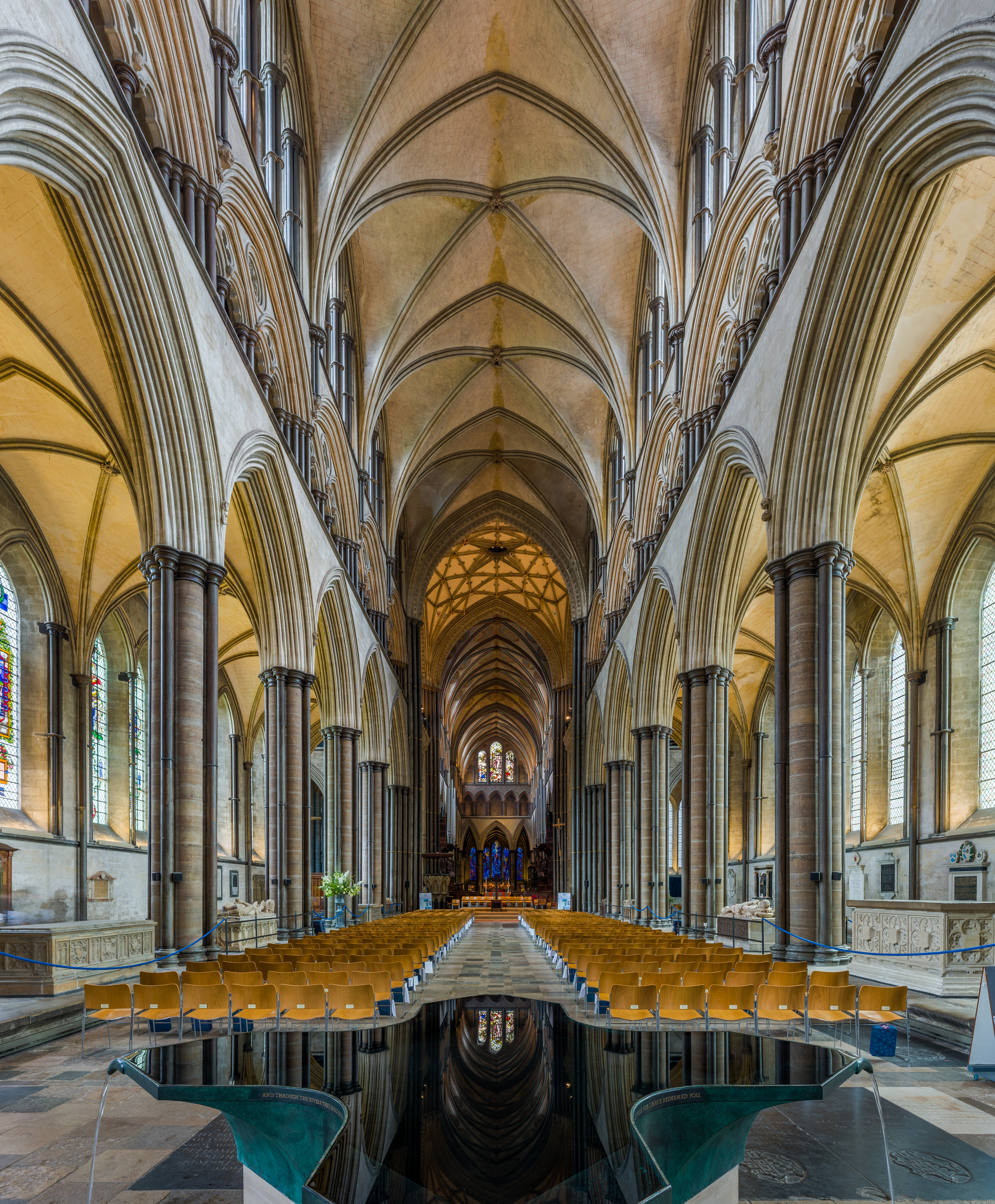
Nave of Salisbury Cathedral (1220–1258)

== Cistercian Gothic (12th century) ==
Many of the abbey churches of the Cistercian monastic order, particularly the later churches, had a unique austere form of Gothic. The order, founded in 1098 by an English monk, Saint Stephen Harding, at the monastery of Citeaux, was based humility and discipline. They were known as the "white monks" because of their white robes, while the Benedictines were the "black monks". They systematically forbade sculptural decoration, illuminated manuscripts, stone towers on churches, and stained glass. Abbeys were located in remote areas, far from the cities. It spread rapidly, founding seven hundred monasteries across Europe. The early church architecture was based on the Romanesque model, with a long, high nave and side aisles, and an apse to the east. Gradually the rounded arches were replaced with the pointed arch, and the flying buttress appeared on some of the churches.

- Citeaux Abbey (1125–93) in France was the first Cistercian monastery, located in a remote part of the forest and the first monastery built in the forest south of Dijon. Several original Gothic portions survive, including parts of the great church (1140–1193) and the scriptorium, where the monks copied books and religious texts. It is now a Trappist monastery.
- Clairvaux Abbey (1133–74) was founded by a monk from Citeaux, Saint Bernard of Clairvaux, It gradually became the mother church of the growing order. By the time of the death of Saint Bernard, there were 338 Cistercian Abbeys, including 68 founded directly by Saint Bernard. They were found in nearly every part of Europe, from Sweden and Scotland south to Portugal, and to the eastern end of the Mediterranean. But of the original Gothic abbey of Clairvaux, only a vaulted stone storehouse remains.
- Fontenay Abbey in Burgundy was founded by Saint Bernard of Clairvaux in 1118, because he felt the monks of Clairvaux were not following the rules strictly enough. It was completed by 1200, and could shelter three hundred monks. Much of the original Abbey still stands. It was an early hybrid of Romanesque and Gothic: the barrel vaults are slightly pointed, rather than rounded, as are the windows.
- Rievaulx Abbey in North Yorkshire. In England, now in ruins, is one of the best examples of the style. It was built in 1132 by Saint Bernard of Clairvaux, the founder of the Cistercians, as their mother church in England. It was closed in 1538 by Henry VIII and fell into ruin, but the chancel and chapel and transept are still standing.

Other examples of Cistercian Gothic can be found across Europe, and several are UNESCO World Heritage Sites. These include Alcobaça Monastery in Portugal, Poblet Abbey in Spain, and Maulbronn Abbey in Germany. Maulbronn, begun in Romanesque style, had portions rebuilt into Gothic style in the late 13th century, including the "Paradise", or narthex, the southern part of the cloisters, and the refectory, or monks' dining room.

The early Gothic style was also used in the reconstruction of several English Benedictine abbeys, notably Whitby Abbey. All of England's monasteries, including Westminster Abbey, were closed by Henry VIII in 1538, as part of his dissolution of monasteries. Westminster Abbey was turned a Collegiate church by Queen Elizabeth I in 1560, but most, like Whitby Abbey, are now picturesque ruins, or were destroyed.

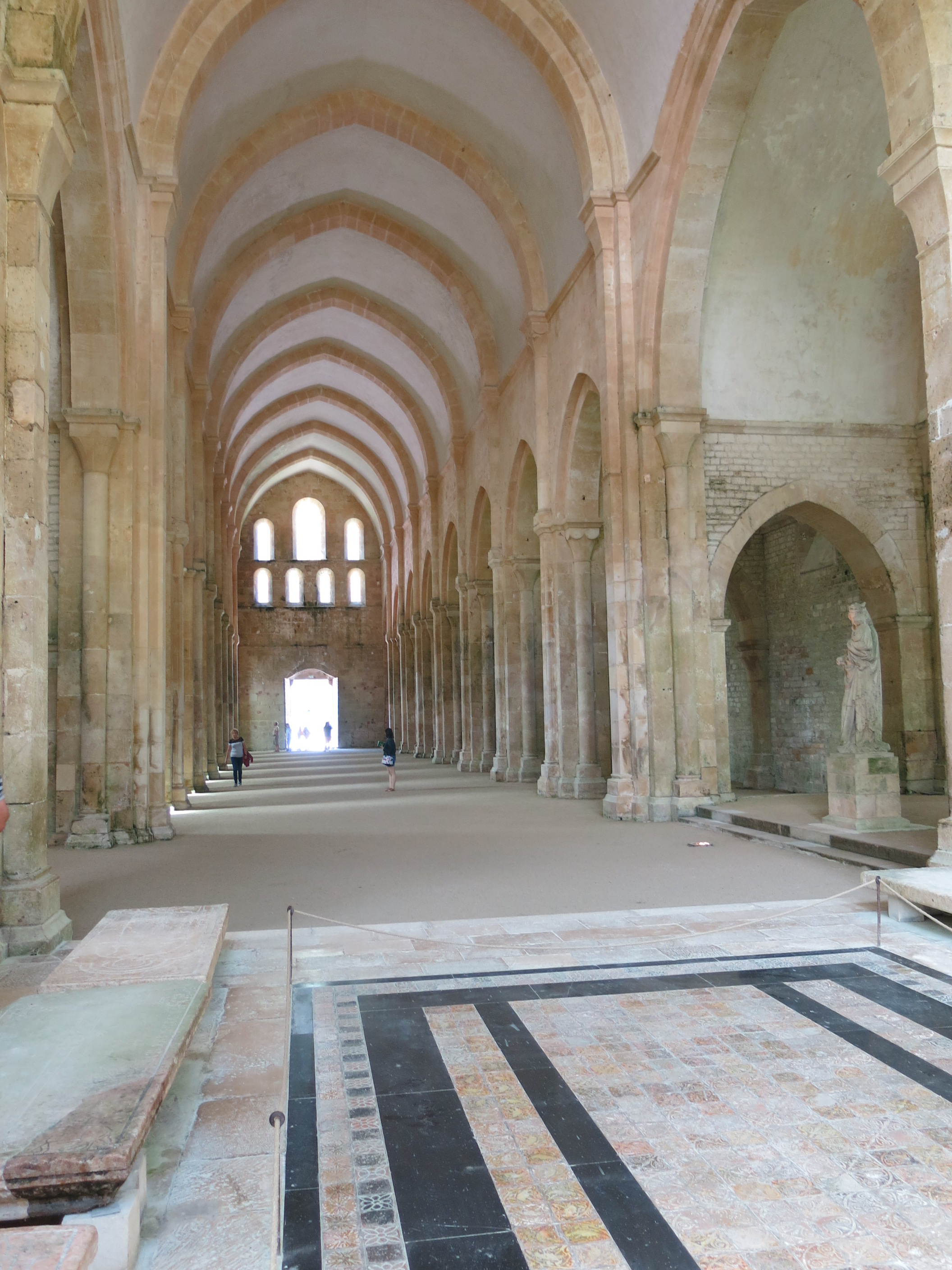
Nave of Fontenay Abbey church, with pointed barrel vaults (1147).

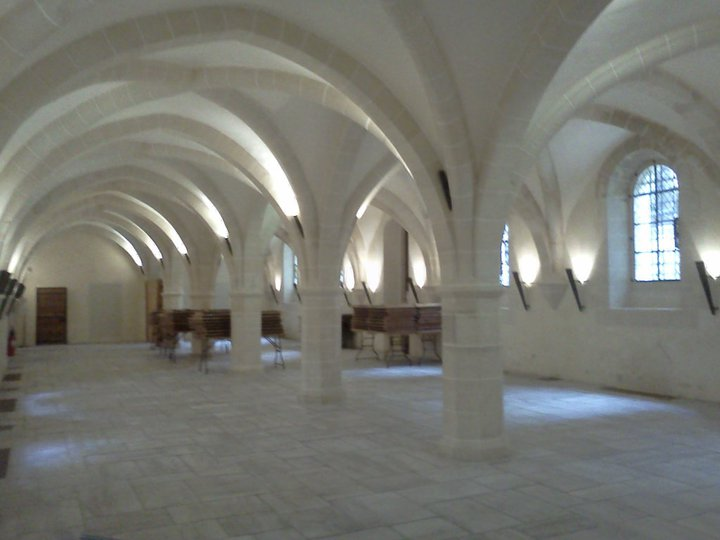
Cellar of Clairvaux Abbey, Dijon (12–13th century)

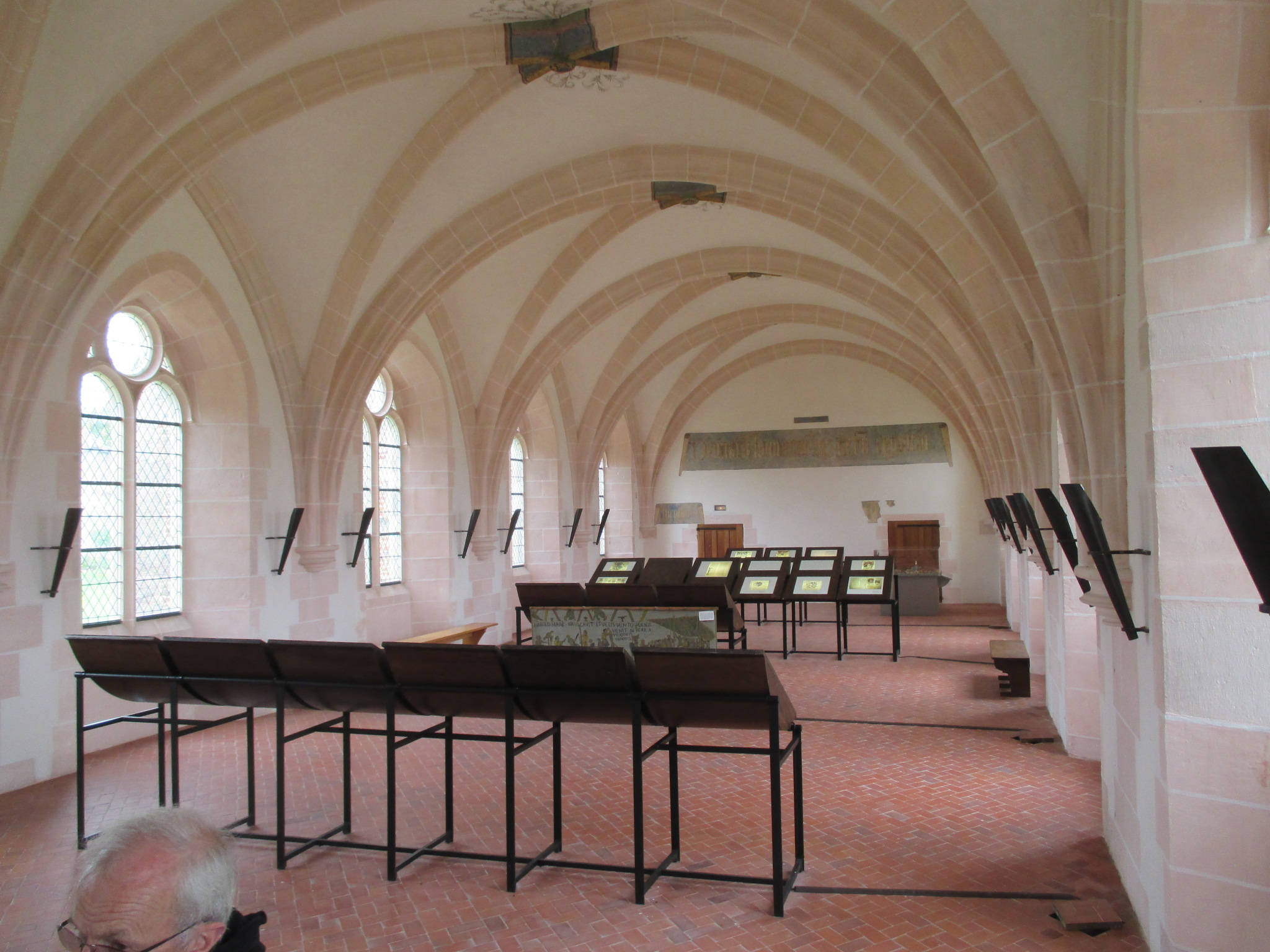
Library of Citeaux Abbey (13th century)

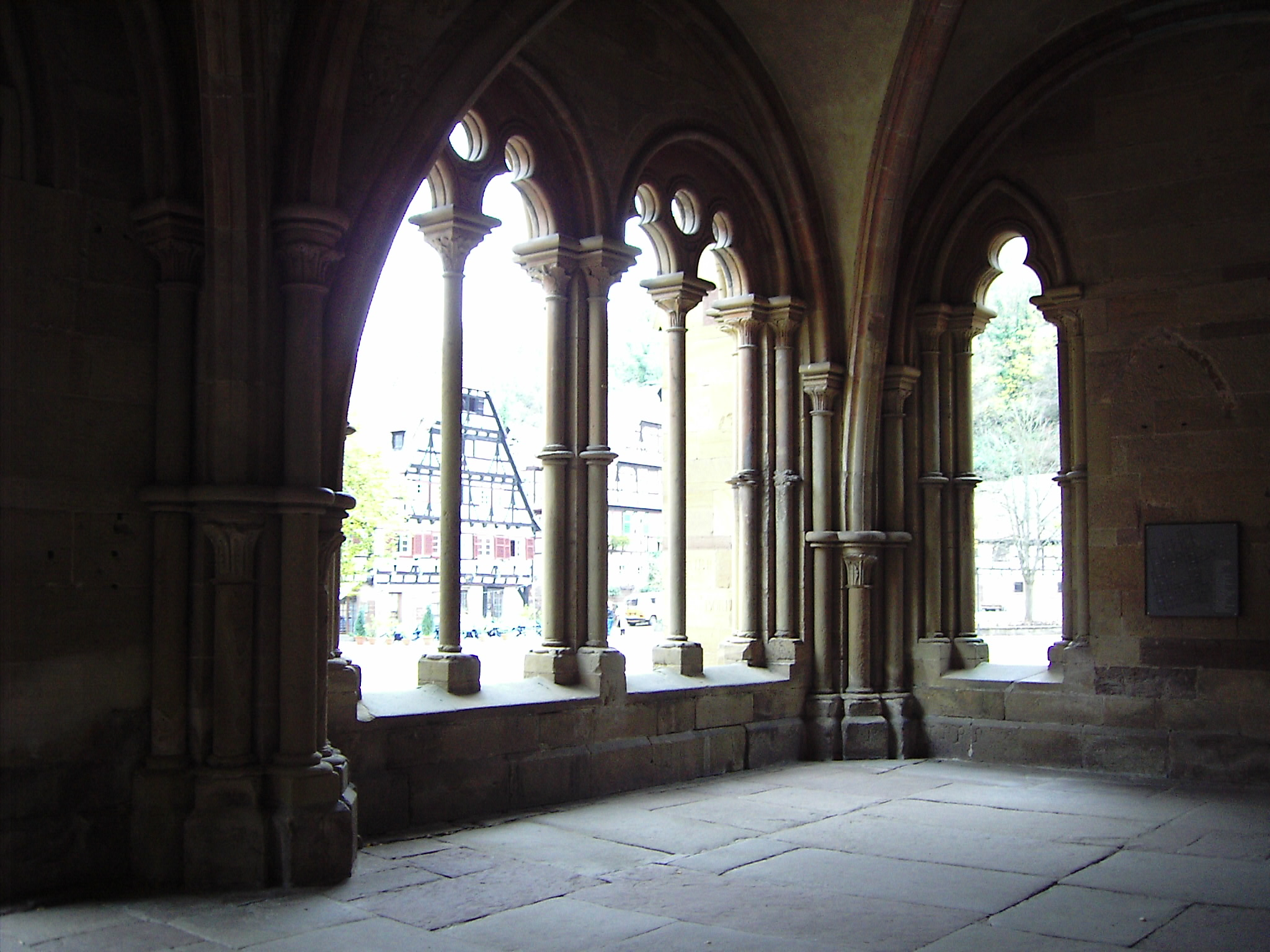
The "Paradise" or Narthex of Maulbronn Abbey, Germany (late 13th century)

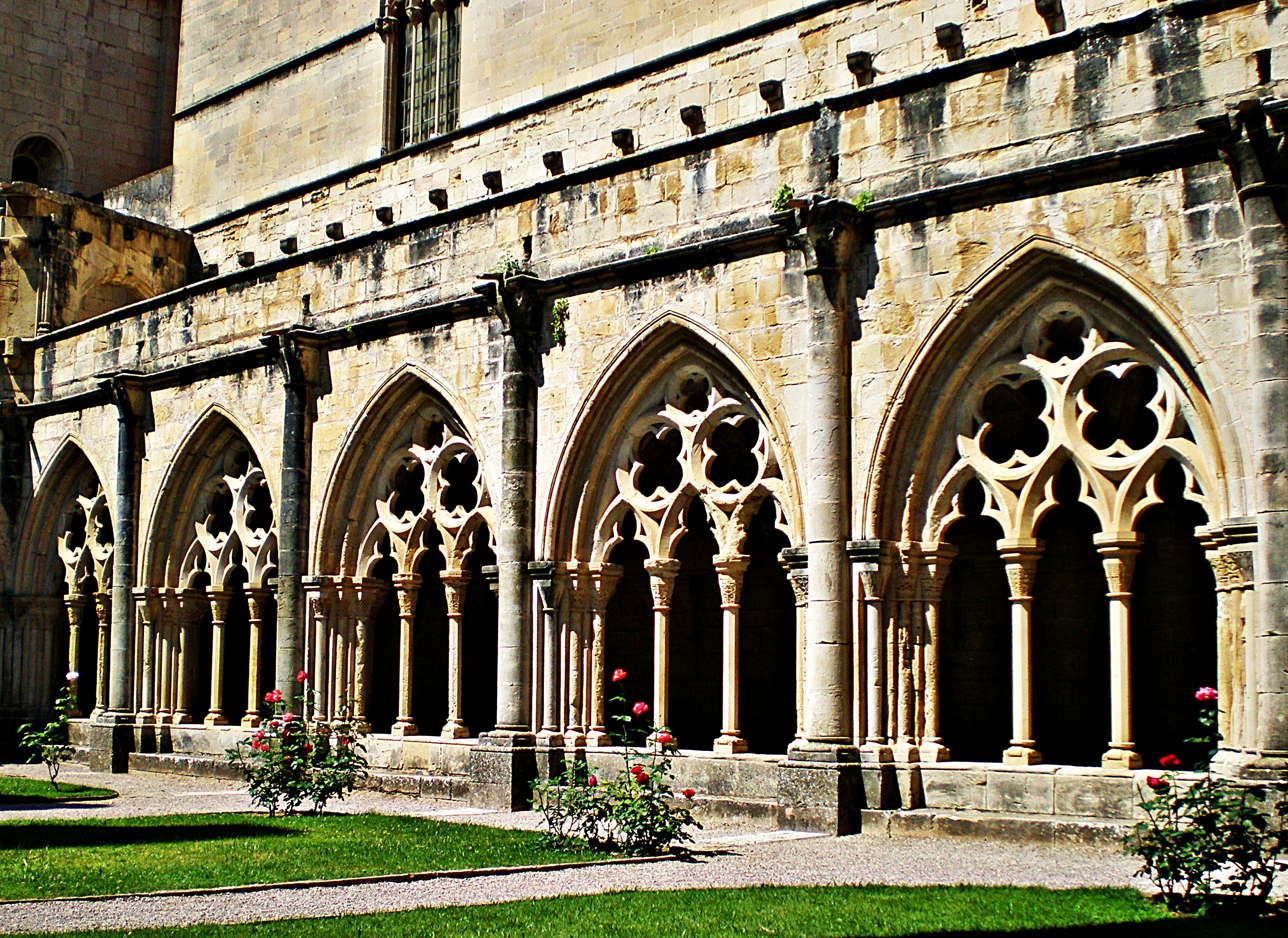
Cloister of Poblet Monastery, Spain (founded 1153)

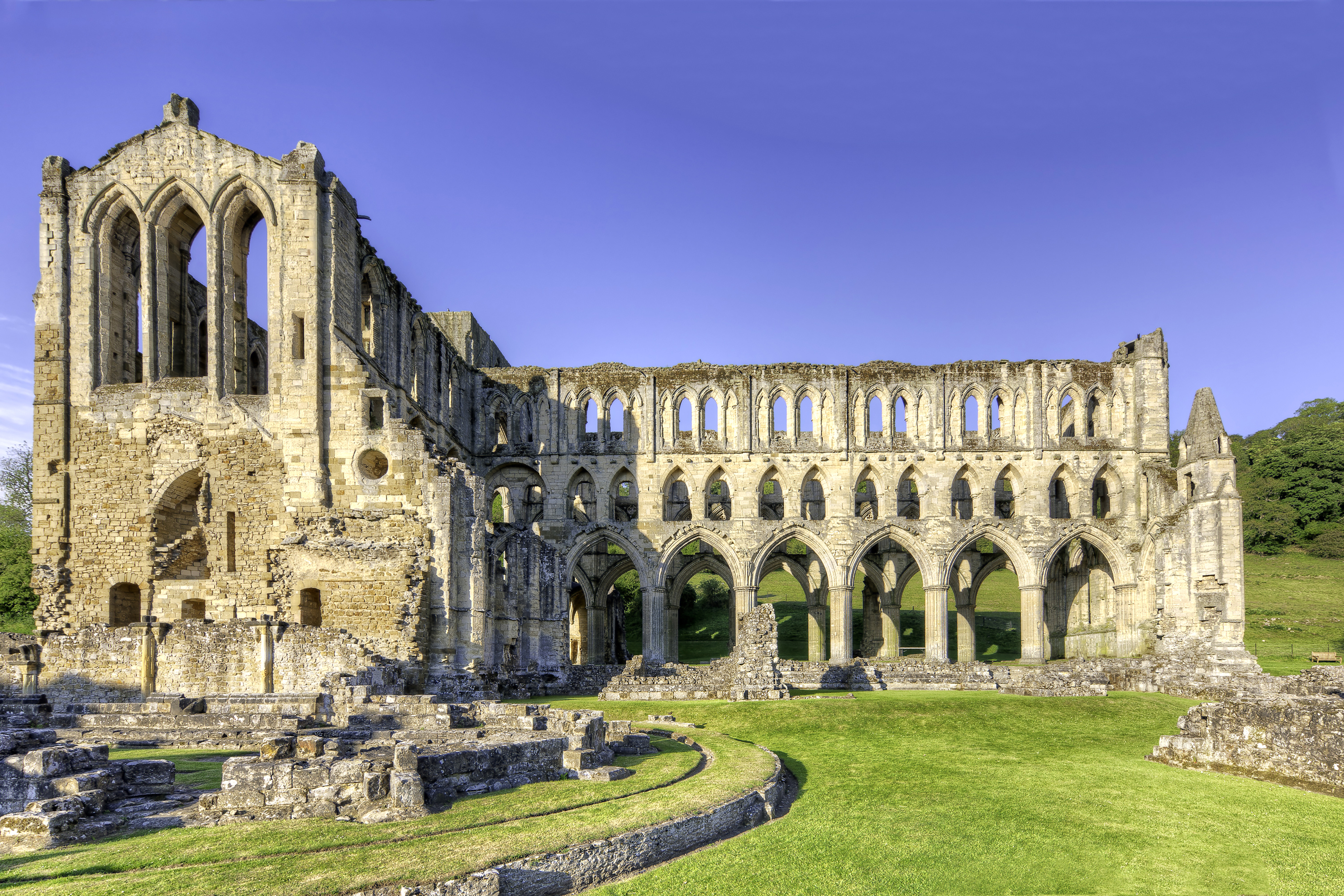
Ruins of Rievaulx Abbey (begun 1132)

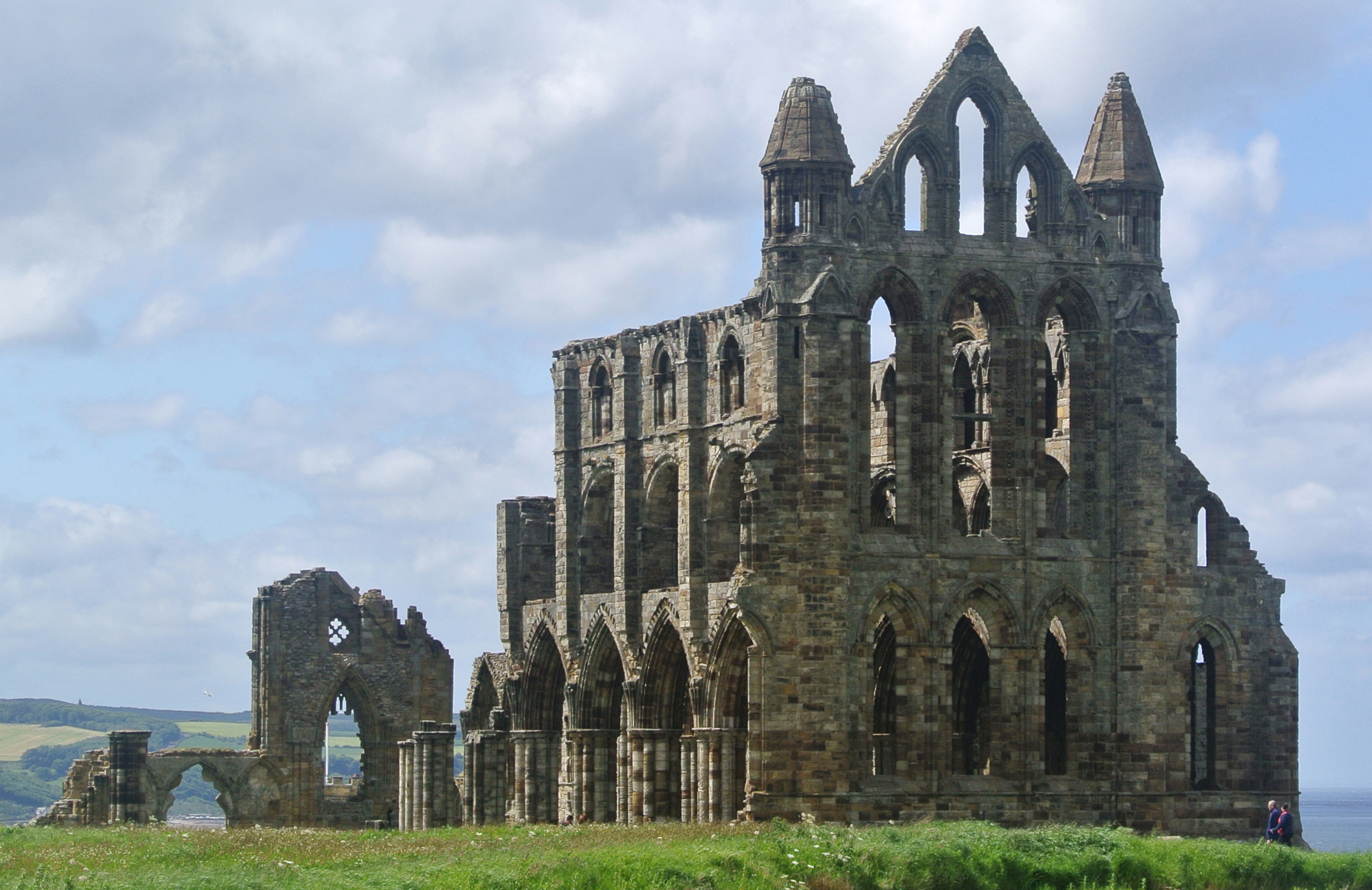
Whitby Abbey (1220s)

== High Gothic and Rayonnant Gothic – France (Thirteenth Century) ==
In France, the last part of the long reign of King Philippe Auguste (1179–1223) marked the classic period of the Gothic Cathedral. He transformed the country from a small feudal state to the most prosperous and powerful nation in Europe. He was also a great builder, constructing the Louvre Palace and the first wall around Paris, and founding the University of Paris (1215). The new structures were larger and taller, and their forms were simplified and more balanced. He was succeeded by Louis IX of France, whose reign saw the construction of several great cathedrals, and his own remarkable chapel, Sainte-Chapelle.

The early thirteenth-century cathedral style in France is often called High Gothic. The objective of the architects was larger windows and more lavish decoration rather than simply greater size. The mid-level triforium gradually disappeared, and stained glass windows seemed to cover entire walls. The great monuments of the style included Amiens Cathedral, the modified Notre Dame de Paris, and especially the royal chapel of Louis IX of France, Sainte-Chapelle (consecrated 1248).

- Chartres Cathedral was constructed following the destruction by fire of the Romanesque cathedral in 1194, which left only the crypt, royal total an apse intact. It was rapidly reconstructed, and was largely finished by 1221. It surpassed Notre Dame de Paris both in length (130.2 meters) and height (36 meters). It had an immense transept which had its own collateral chapels. The choir was extended by a double disambulatory with three radiating chapels. Chartres has a number of innovative features. The traditional level of tribunes on both sides of the nave were removed, thanks to the strength and reach of the flying buttresses, reducing the number of levels from four to three. This made room for a row of large windows, the same height as the ground-floor arcades, bringing much more light into the church, and a greater sensation of harmony. Another innovation was the use of the simpler but stronger quadripartite rib vault instead of the six-part vaults of Notre Dame, which allowed greater height and a simpler arrangement of columns and pillars on the ground floor. The cathedral was originally planned to have seven towers, but in the end had only two, from different periods. Another feature of Chartres was the use of walls painted white or in different colours. As of 2020, after the walls had been cleaned of soot and dirt, these colours are in the process of being restored or recreated, a measure that has drawn some criticism.
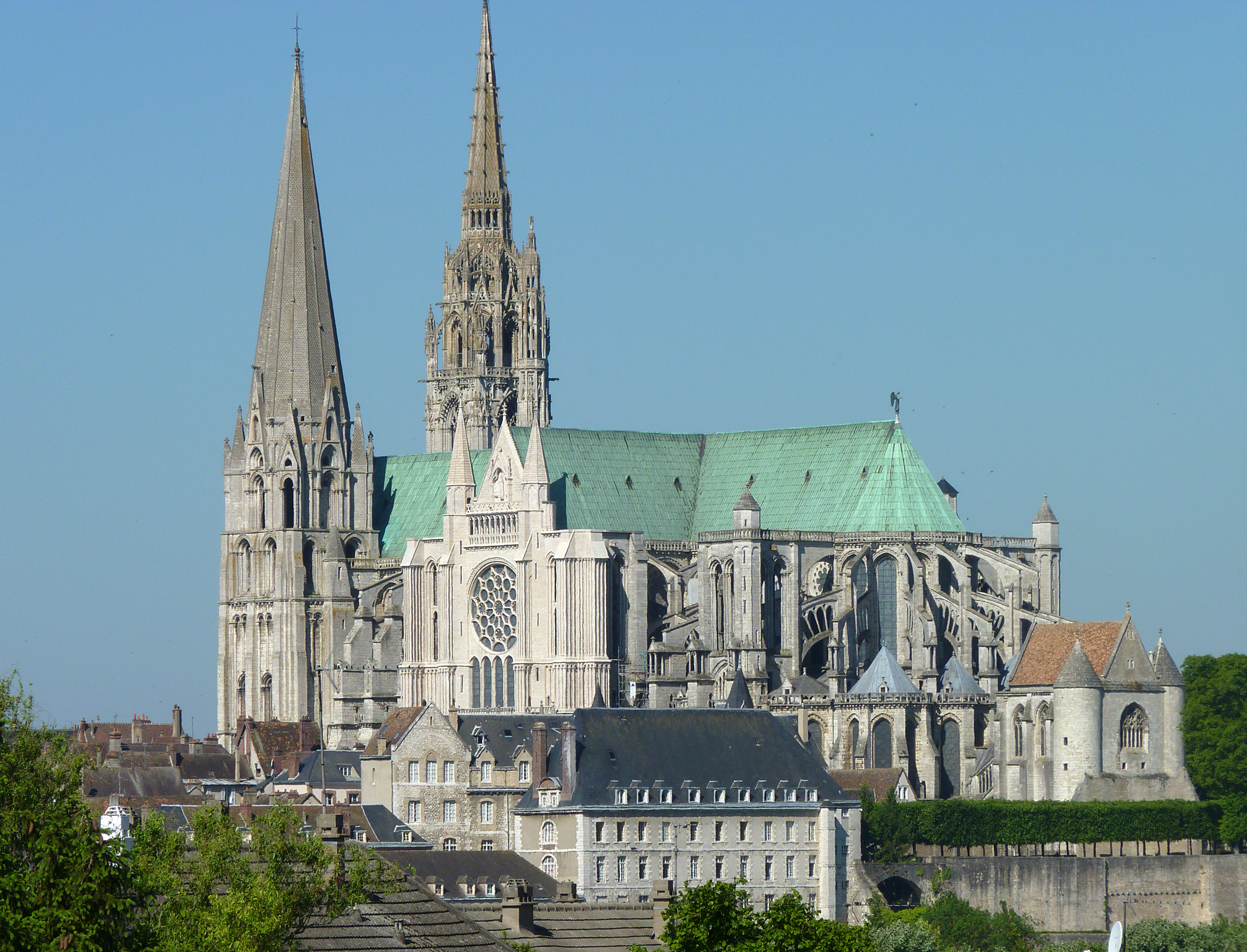
Chartres Cathedral (1194–1221), showing the flying buttresses.

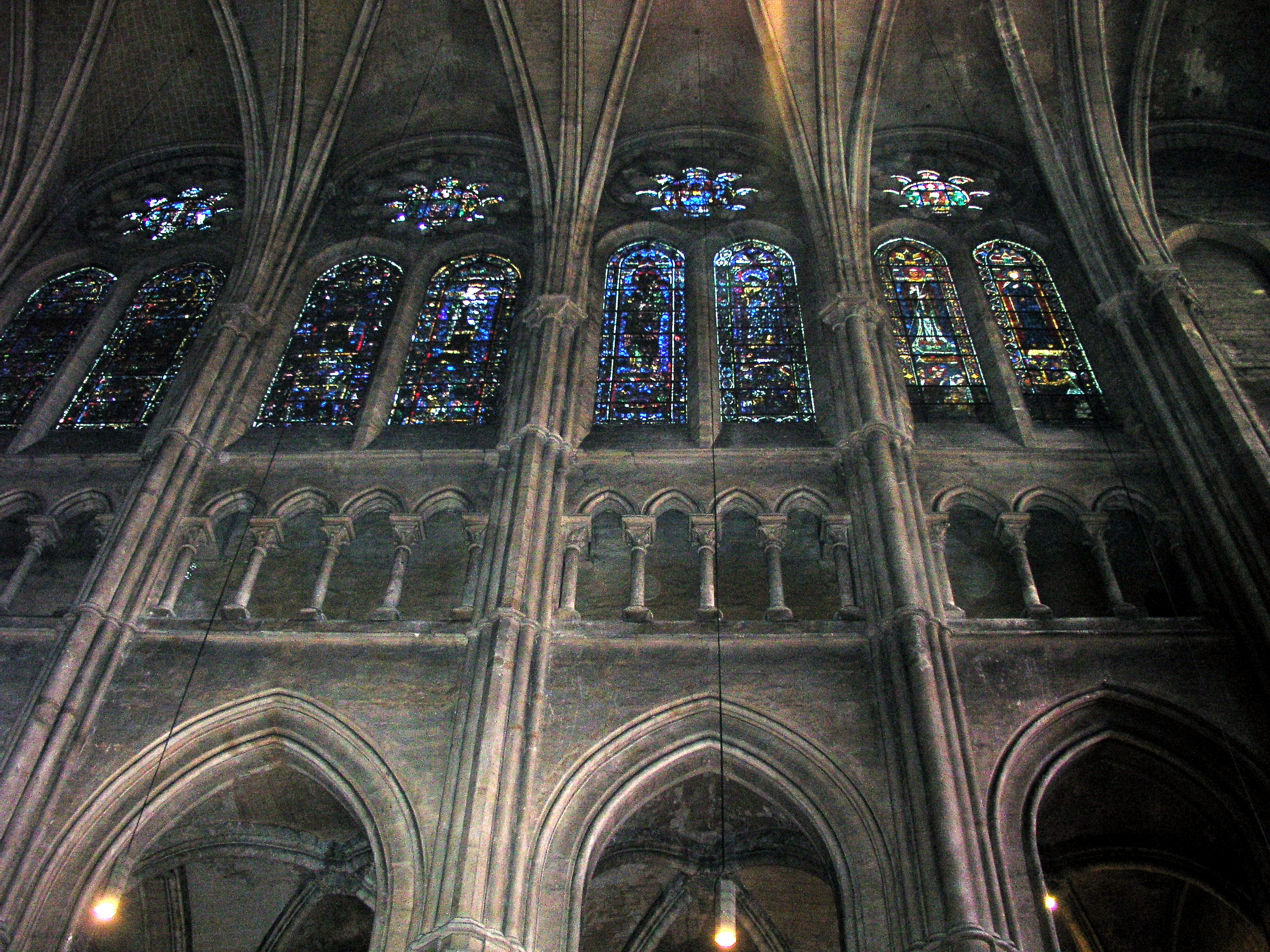
The three levels of the nave of Chartres Cathedral, with larger windows in the clerestory on the top level.

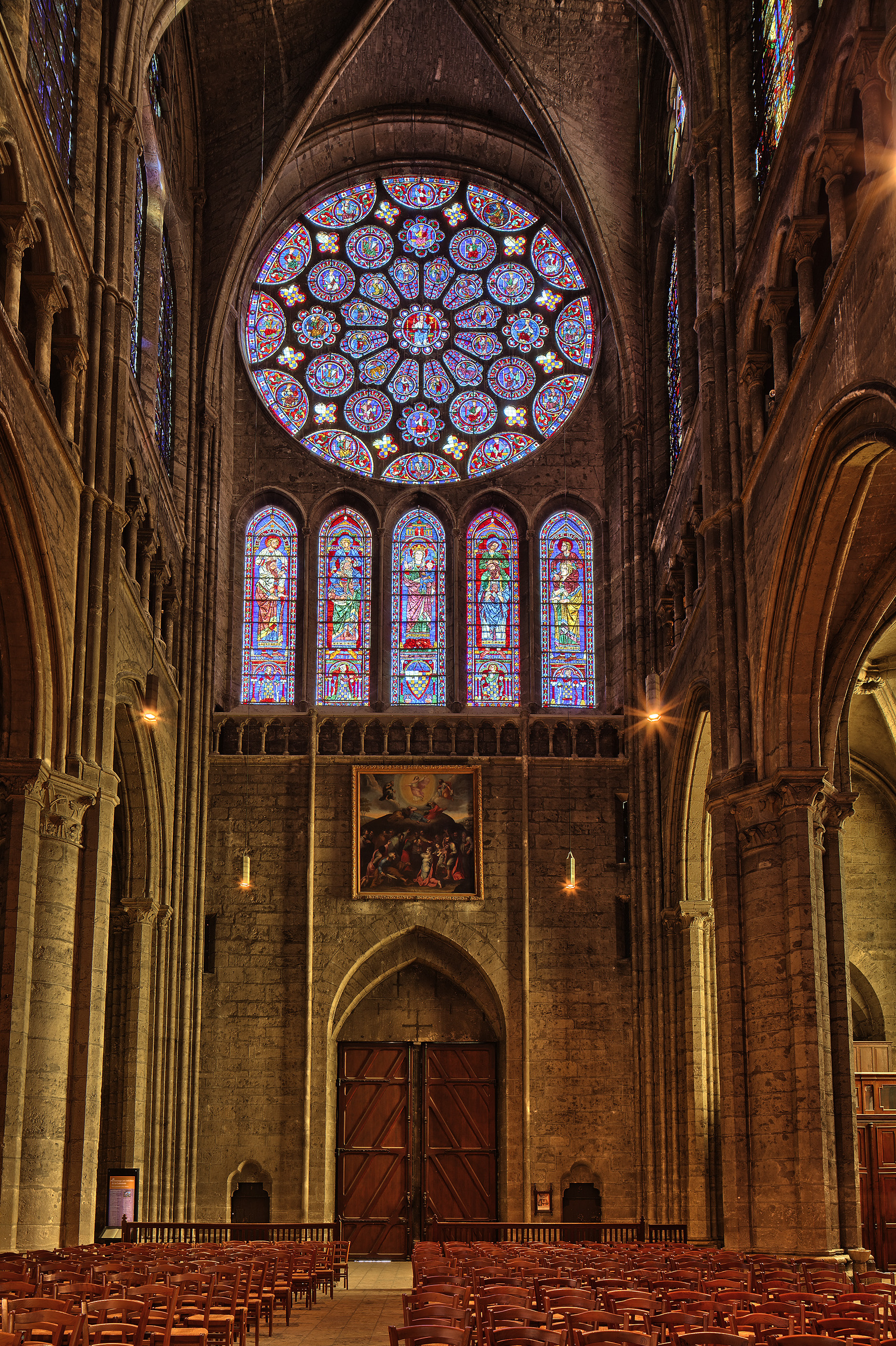
South rose window of Chartres Cathedral.
- Notre Dame de Paris during the reign of Louis IX underwent enlargement and extensive modifications into the Rayonnant style. The old sexpartite rib vaults vaults in the nave were replaced by the simpler and stronger quadripartite vaults. Dramatic new Rayonnant rose windows were added to the north and south transepts. Longer and stronger flying buttresses were added to support the choir, which allowed thinner walls, and larger windows were added to the clerestory. The two towers were completed in 1245.
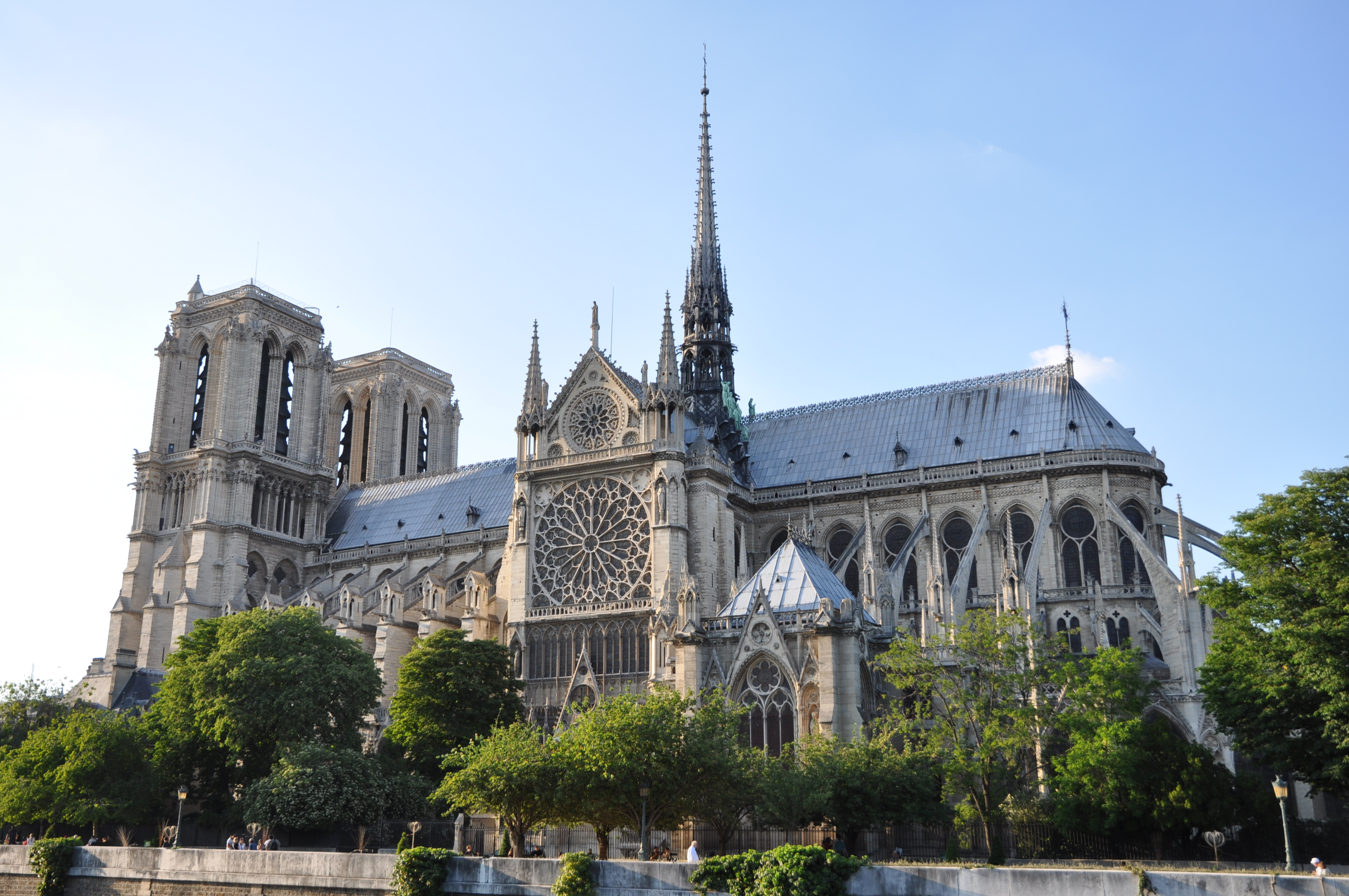
Notre-Dame, showing south rose window and extended flying buttresses around the choir (about 1260)

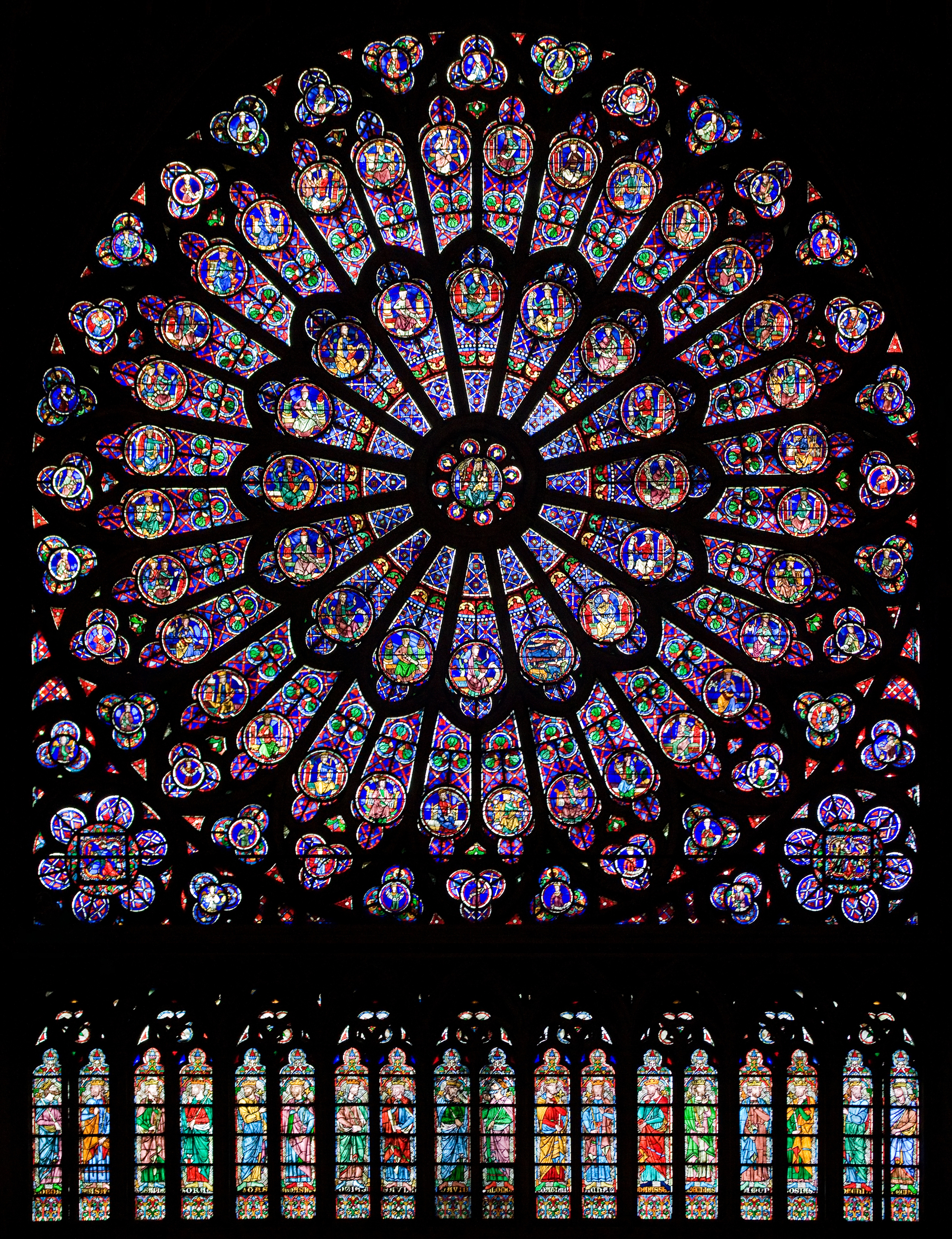
The north rose window of Notre Dame (about 1260)
- Amiens Cathedral was begun in 1220. Its builder, the Bishop Evrard de Fouilloy, had the ambition of making it the largest cathedral in France, and he succeeded. Its nave is 145 meters long and 70 meters wide at the transept. Its elevation copied Chartres in having just three, not four levels, but the plan was very different. At Amiens the arcades on the ground floor are a full eighteen meters high, equaling the combined height of the triforium and clerestory above. Amiens adopted the system of stained glass windows in chassis that was used at Reims, but went a step further. The high clerestory windows in the nave are composed of four lancet windows topped by two rosettes, while those in the transept have as many as eight lancets in single window.
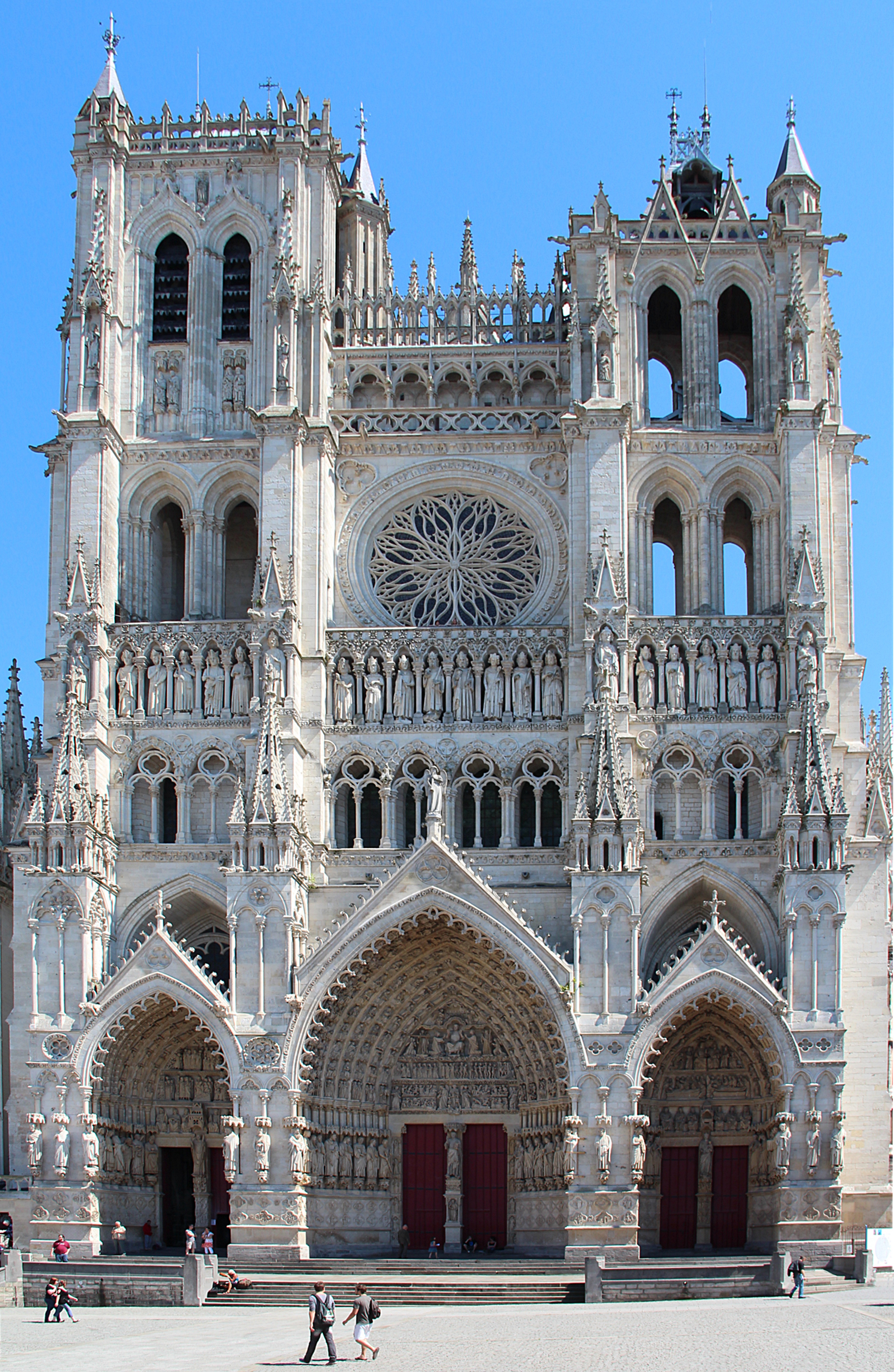
Amiens Cathedral (begun 1220)

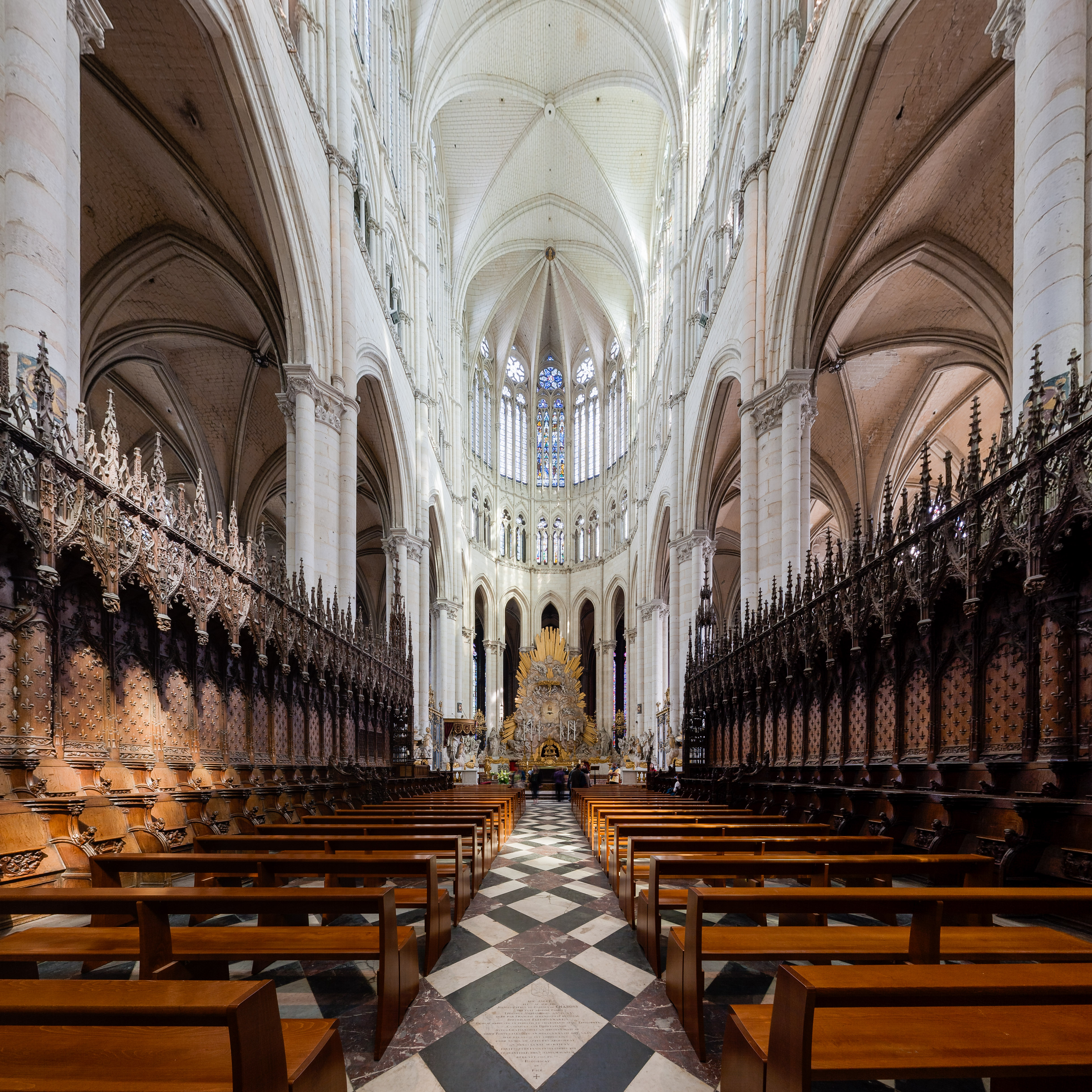
Choir and altar of Amiens Cathedral
- Sainte-Chapelle (1241–48) was the royal chapel constructed by Louis IX of France at his palace on the Île de la Cité in Paris to shelter the relics of the Passion of Christ. It is composed of a lower chapel, used by the Palace and the Court, and an upper chapel, where the relics were kept, where the walls are filled with an exceptional array of stained glass windows.
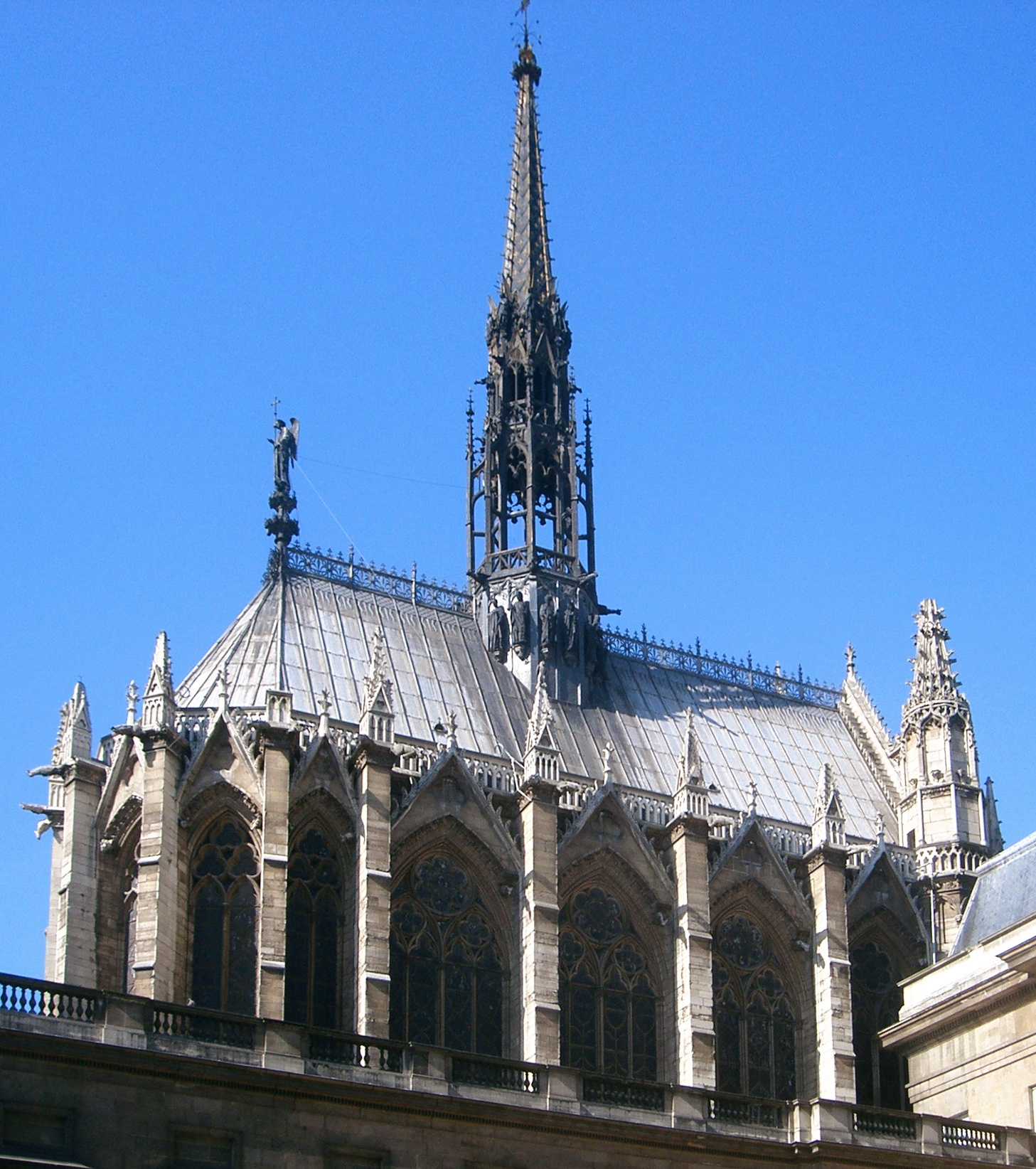
Exterior of Sainte-Chapelle (1241–48)

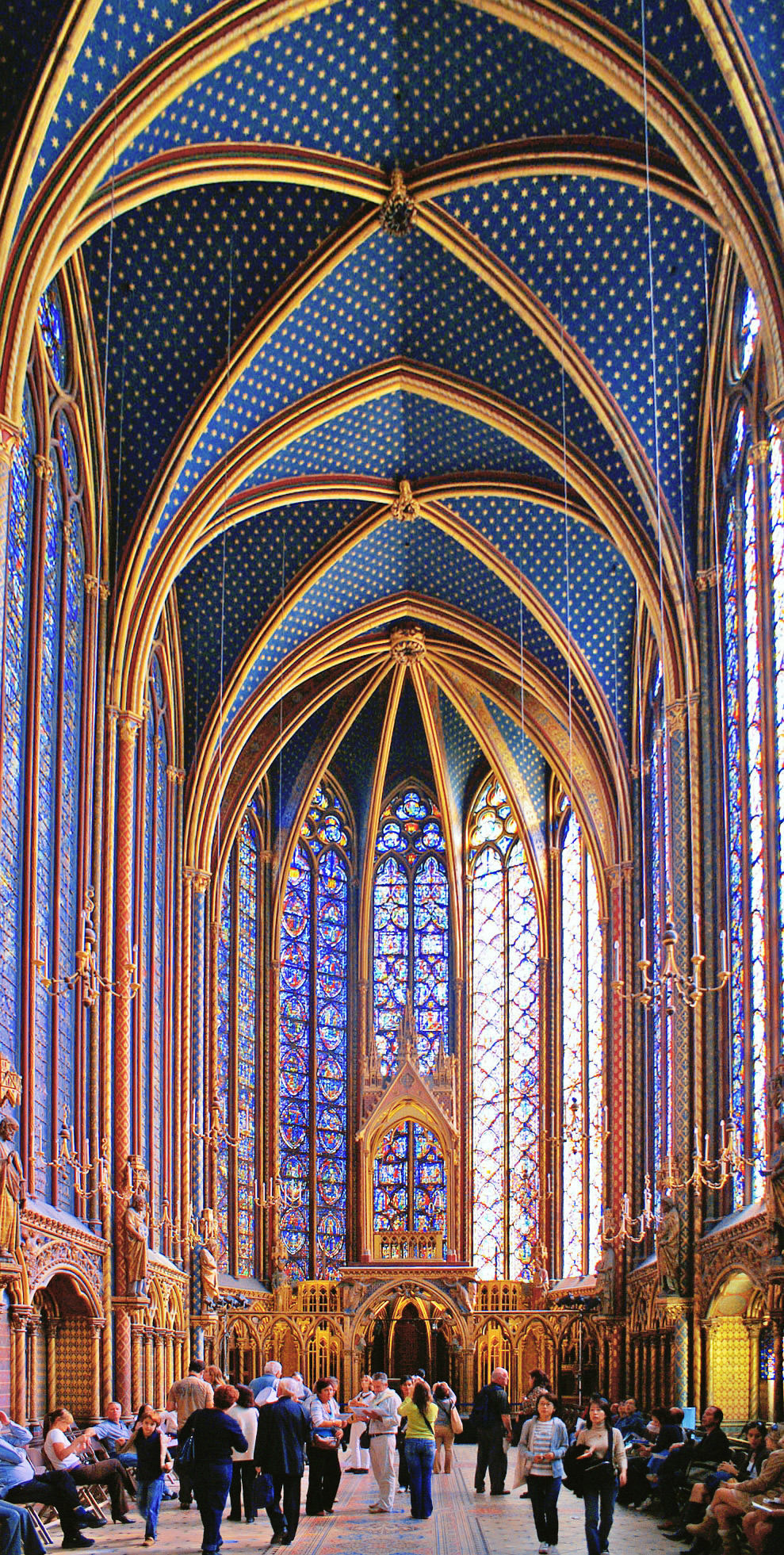
Upper chapel of Sainte-Chapelle (1241–48)

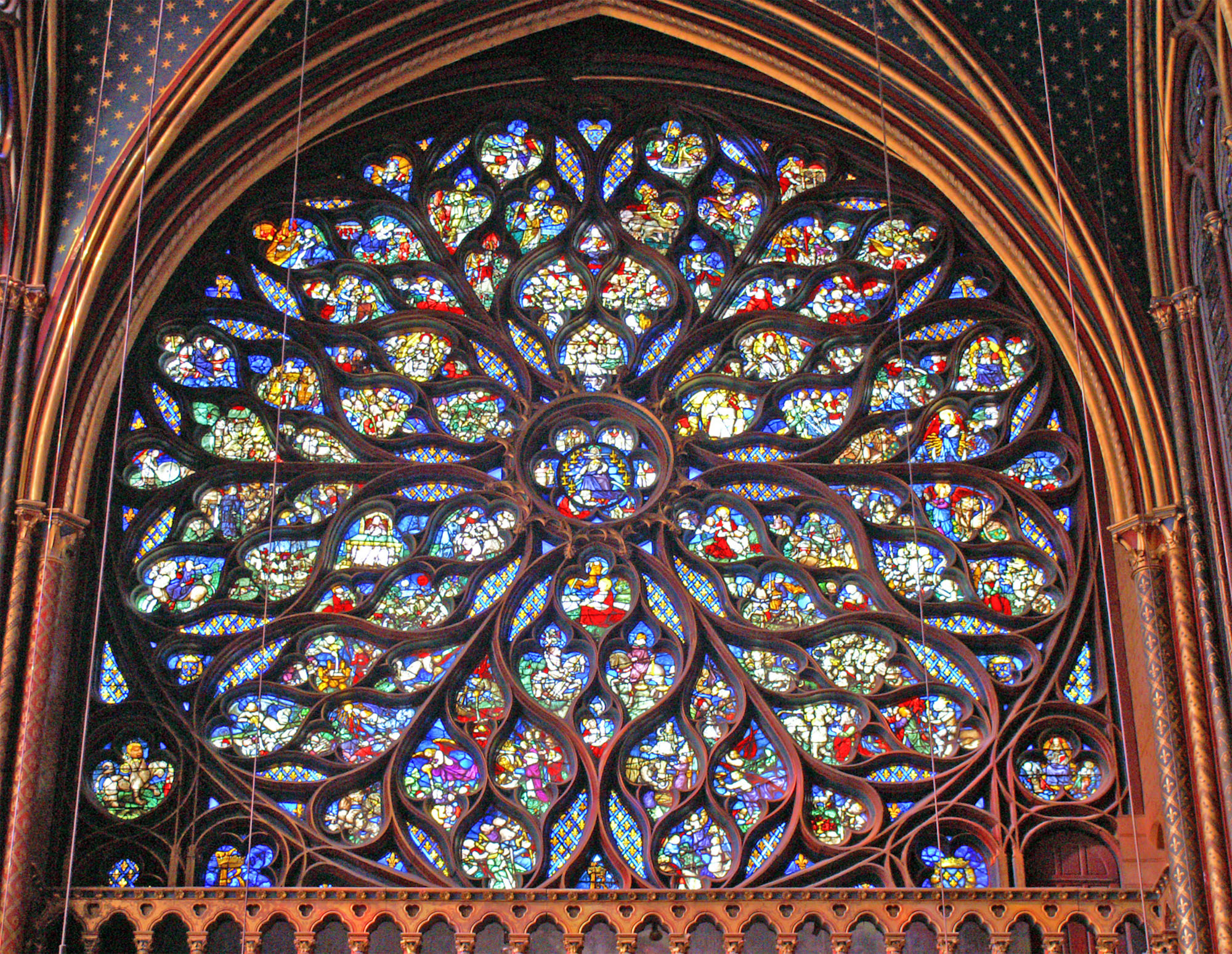
The Rayonnant rose window of Sainte-Chapelle (1241–48)
- Reims Cathedral had the special distinction as the coronation church for the Kings of France. The Romanesque cathedral was destroyed by a fire in 1210. The Archbishop Aubrey de Humbert began a new cathedral in the Gothic style in 1211. The choir was finished in 1241. Work on the façade did not begin until 1251, and was not finished until the 16th century. It was heavily damaged in the First World War, but restored and reconsecrated in 1937. Like Chartres, the elevation has just three levels, giving more space for windows. The traditional tympanum on the façade was replaced by a large rose window, while the sculpture usually on the tympanum was moved to the inside of the façade. Another innovation at the Reims was the placement of each stained glass windows in a large separate chassis, or frame, rather than directly into the wall, which allowed much more complex patterns. Another innovation was the placement of statues of angels sheltered in the pinnacles atop the flying buttresses. In all, Reims has more than 2300 statues in its decoration.
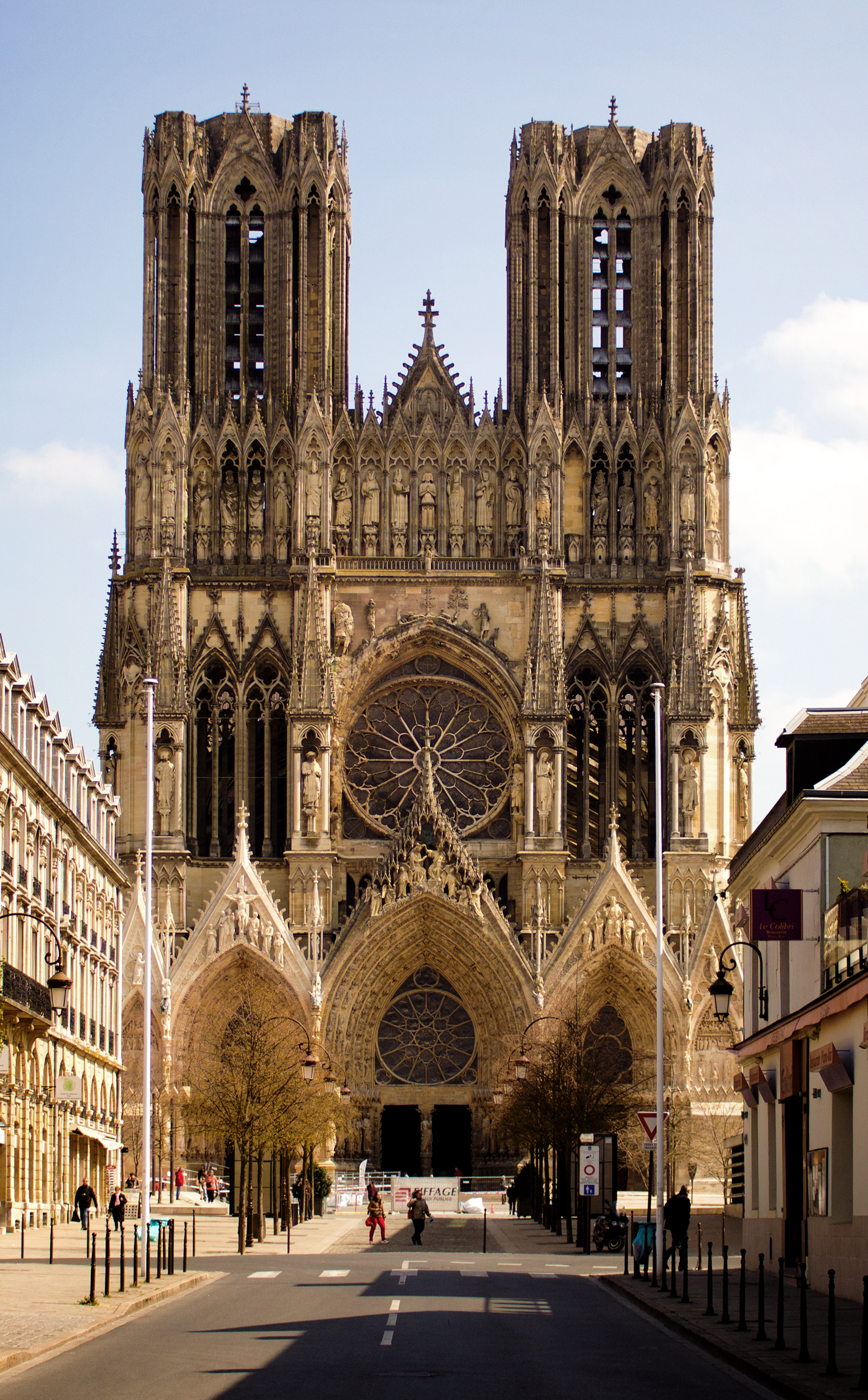
Façade of Reims Cathedral (1211 to the 16th century)

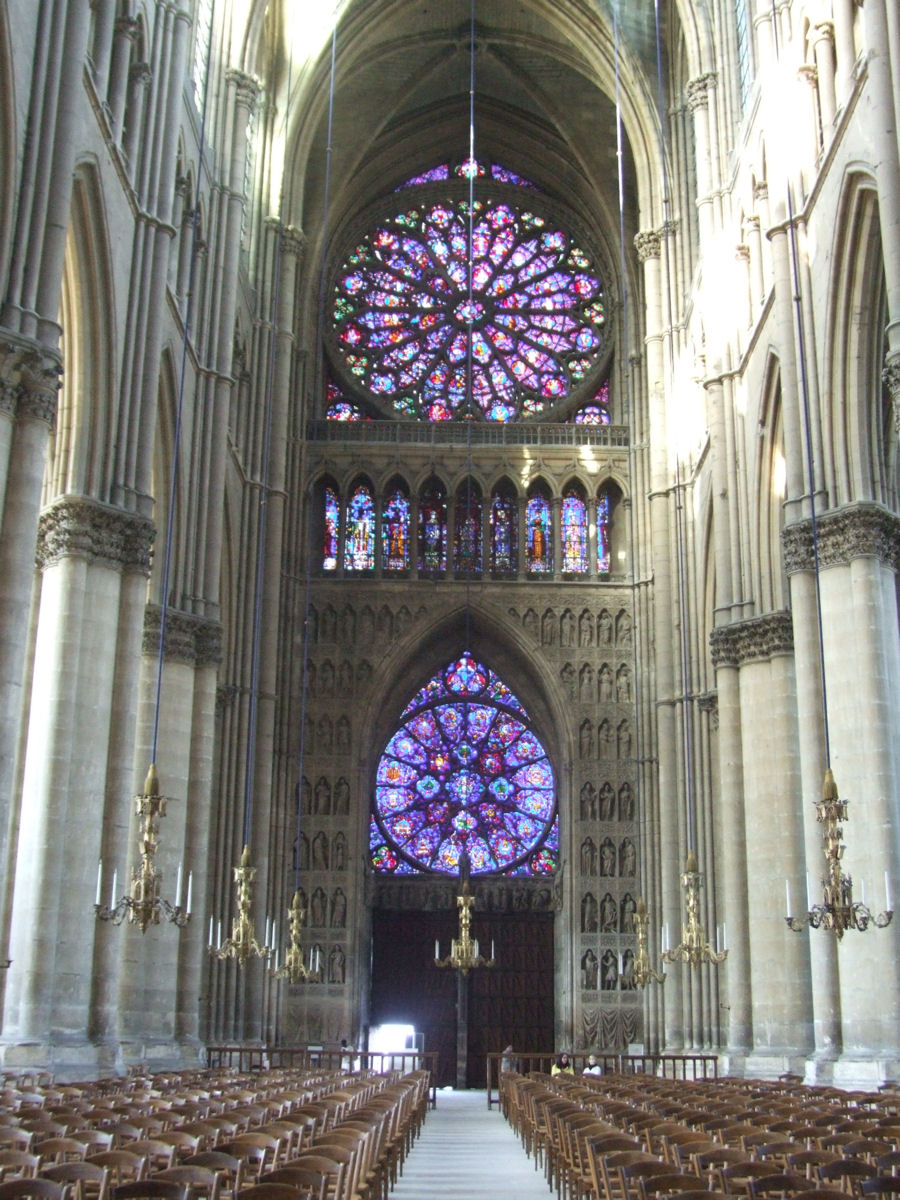
Western rose window
- Beauvais Cathedral had an unfortunate history. After a fire in 1225 destroyed the old cathedral, Bishop Milon de Nanteuil proposed to construct the tallest cathedral of all. The choir, forty meters high, was finished in 1272, but collapsed in 1284. It was rebuilt with reinforced pillar vaults with additional rib in the 14th century. The transept was completed in the 1560s and was capped with a stone and wood spire 150 meters high. Unfortunately, the spire collapsed in 1573, and the cathedral was left unfinished, with only the choir and transept completed.
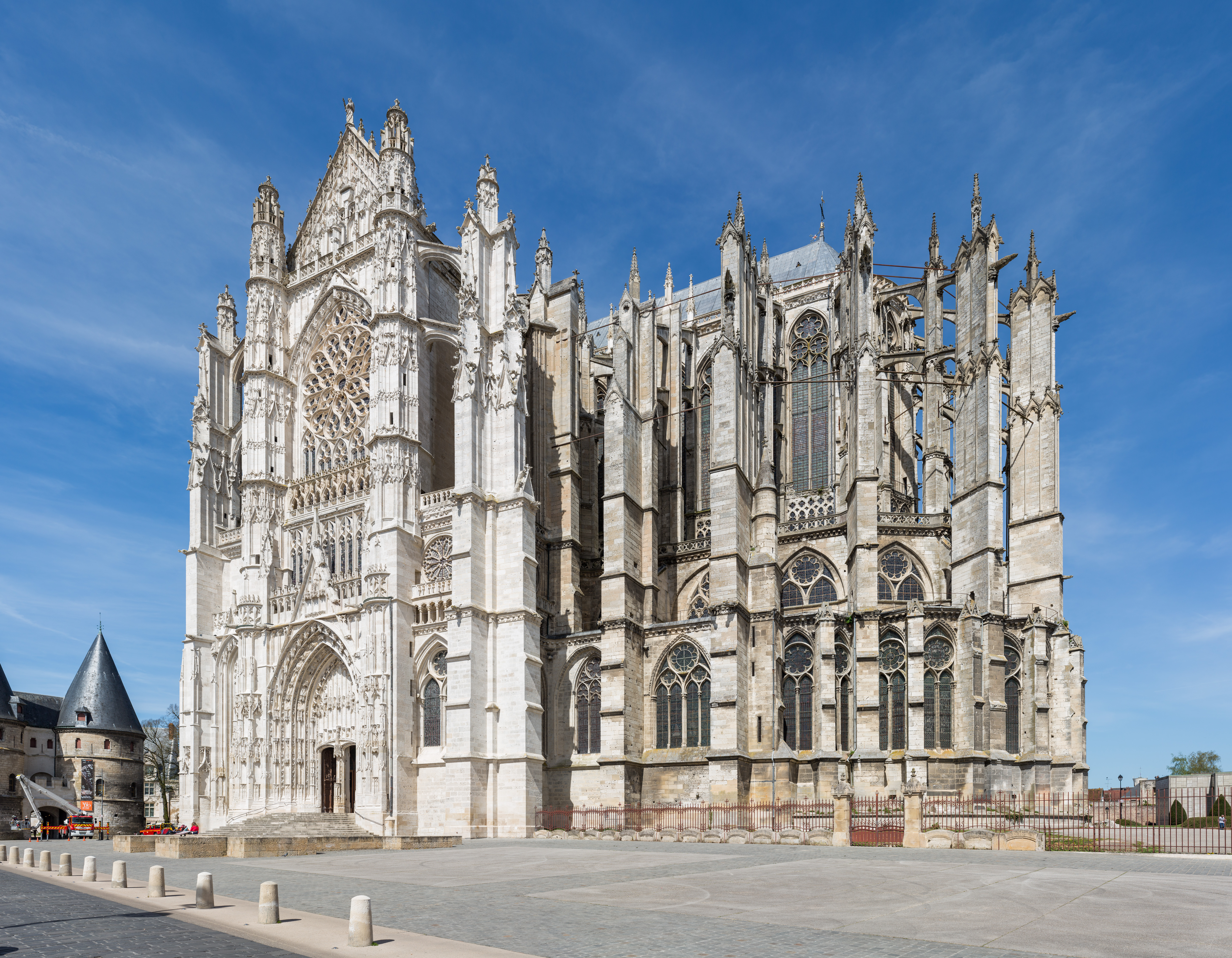
The unfinished Beauvais Cathedral (1225–1272)

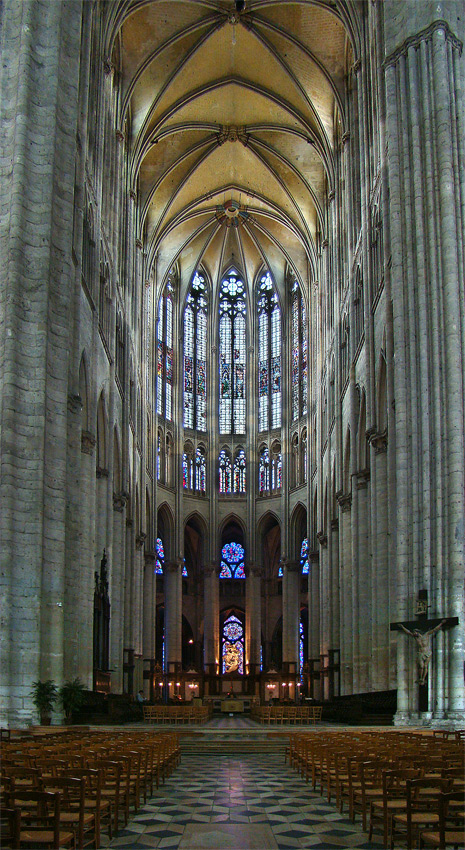
Choir of Beauvais Cathedral

=== French regional Gothic – Normandy ===
At the beginning of the 13th century, Normandy was nominally under English rule, independent of France, and the Romanesque Norman architecture was distinct from the French style. In 1204, King Philip II of France claimed Normandy for France. and in 1259, King Henry III was forced to recognise French sovereignty, though in the following centuries it was often disputed. The early Gothic in Normandy had several distinctive features. One of these was the Norman chevet, a small apse or chapel attached to the choir at the east end of the church, which typically had a half-dome. The lantern tower was another popular feature in Norman Gothic.

- Lessay Abbey (1098) in Normandy, a Benedictine Abbey, founded in 1056 and confirmed by William the Conqueror. The choir was rebuilt with rib vaults beginning in 1098, about the same time as Durham Cathedral and the Basilica of Saint-Denis, making them among the earliest Gothic vaults in Europe. The church was destroyed by the retreating Germans in 1944, and later completely rebuilt in the original Romanesque style.
- Lisieux Cathedral begun in 1170, was one of the first Norman cathedrals to be built with Gothic features.
- Bayeux Cathedral (1060–1070). The Romanesque cathedral nave and choir were rebuilt into the Gothic style.
- Coutances Cathedral was remade into Gothic beginning about 1220. Its most original feature is the octagonal lantern on the crossing of the transept, resting on pendentive vaults, decorated with ornamental ribs, and surrounded by sixteen bays and sixteen lancet windows.
- Rouen Cathedral (begun 1185). The Archbishop of Rouen, Gautier de Coutances, began to reconstruct the Romanesque interior of the newly built Rouen Cathedral, The nave retained the early Gothic plan of four levels, but the tribunes were deliberately left unfinished, and the newer choir merged the four levels into three. The ambulatory was surrounded with three radiating chapels. It retained certain other Norman characteristics, such as the lantern tower, deeply moulded decoration, and high pointed arcades.
- Evreux Cathedral begun in the late 13th century, is filled with light by the merger of the triforium and high windows, It is a notable example of the Norman Rayonnante style.
- Mont-Saint-Michel Abbey was first constructed with pre-Romanesque vaults in the 10th century, then as a Romanesque church (1060–1080), then with Gothic vaults in the nave in 1135. The Gothic structure called La Merveille (The Marvel), the monks' living area, dates to 1203–1228. The Gothic tower replaced the original Romanesque tower in 1311. The Abbey was extensively rebuilt in the 17th century, undoing much of the Gothic work, and then in the 19th century, particularly by Eugène Viollet-le-Duc, to bring it back to his view of its Gothic appearance.
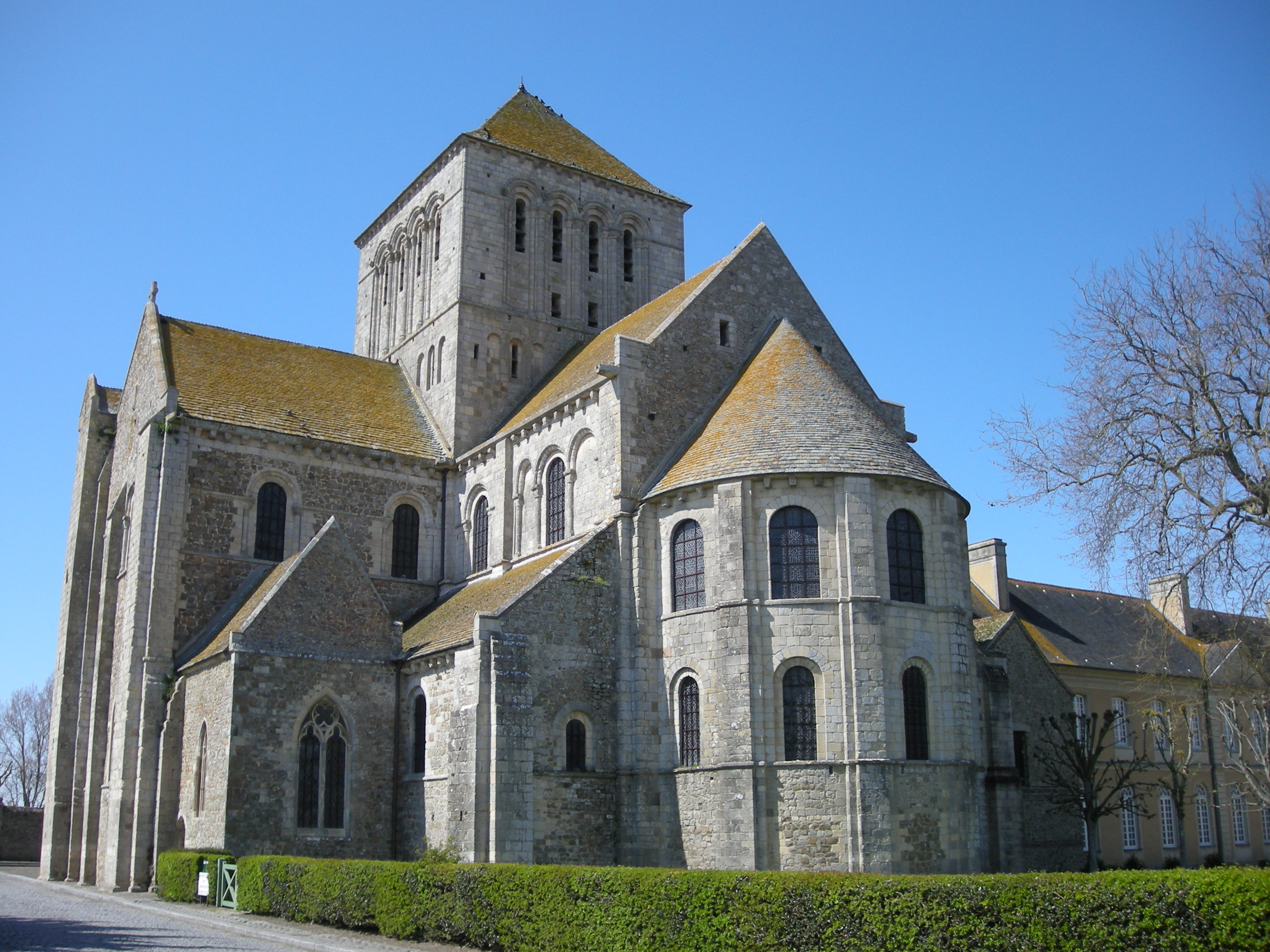
Lessay Abbey, with its Norman lantern tower and at transept and semicircular chevet at the east end

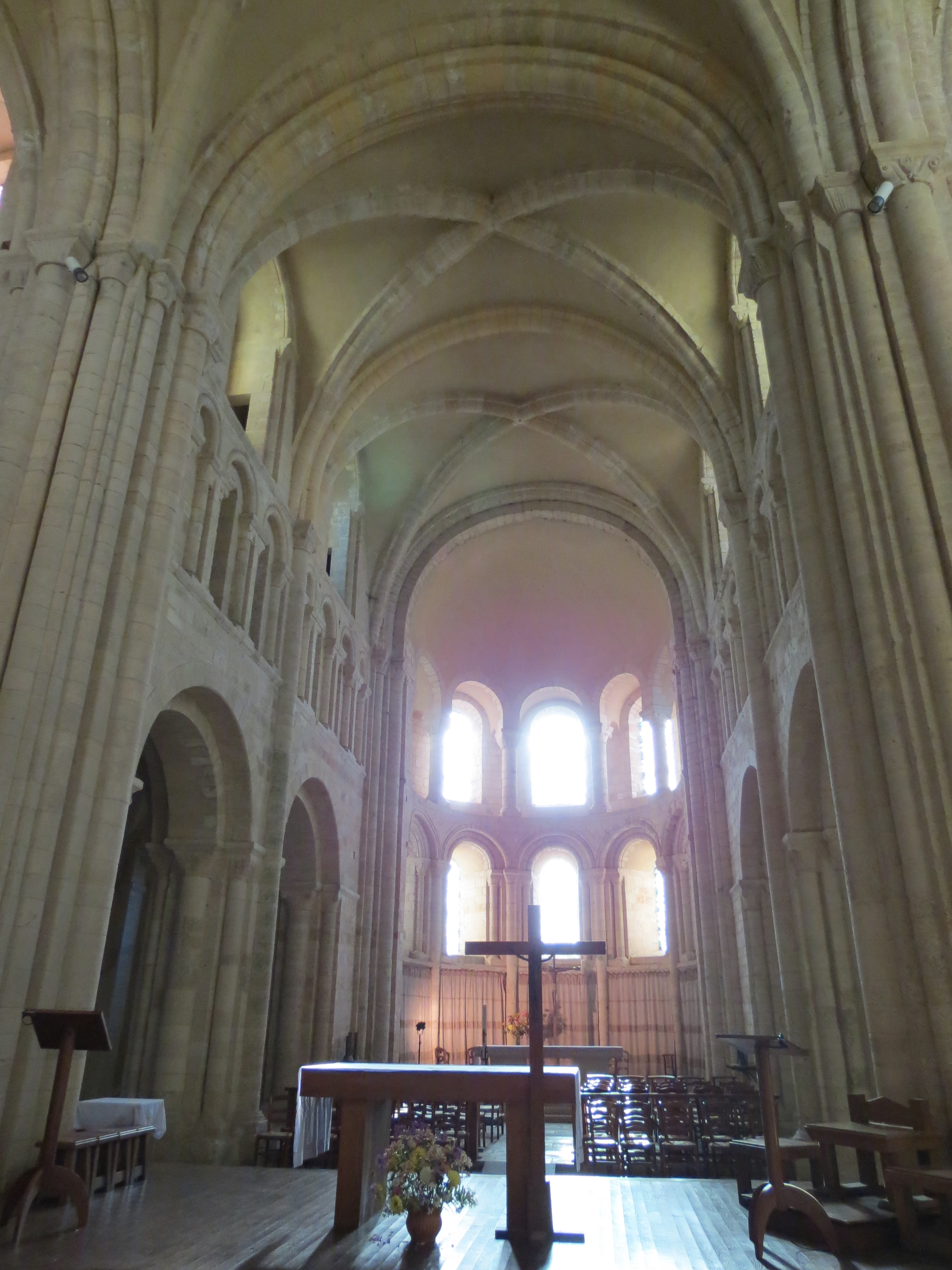
Rib vaults of Lessay Abbey (1098), restored to original form after World War II.

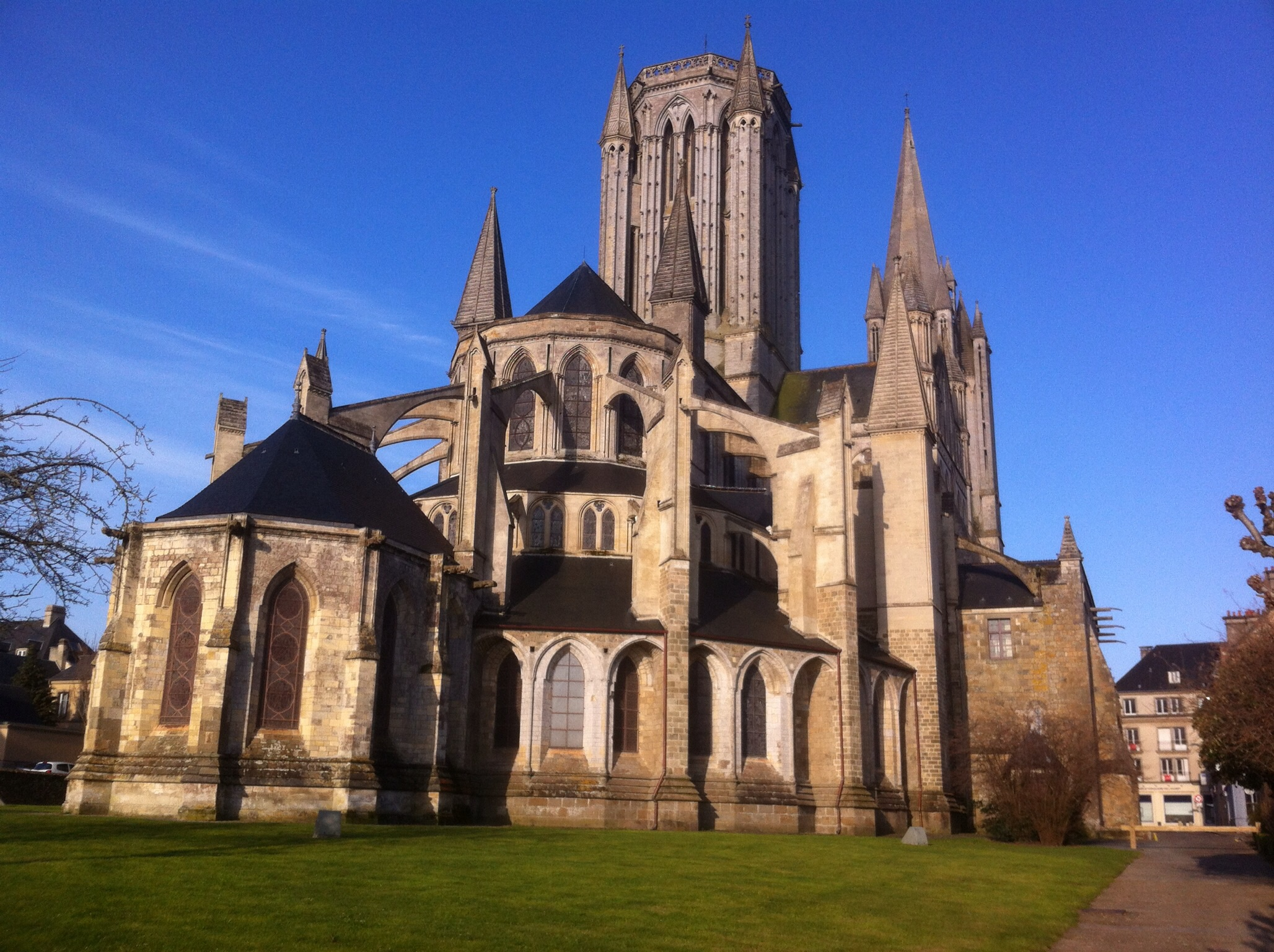
Coutances Cathedral

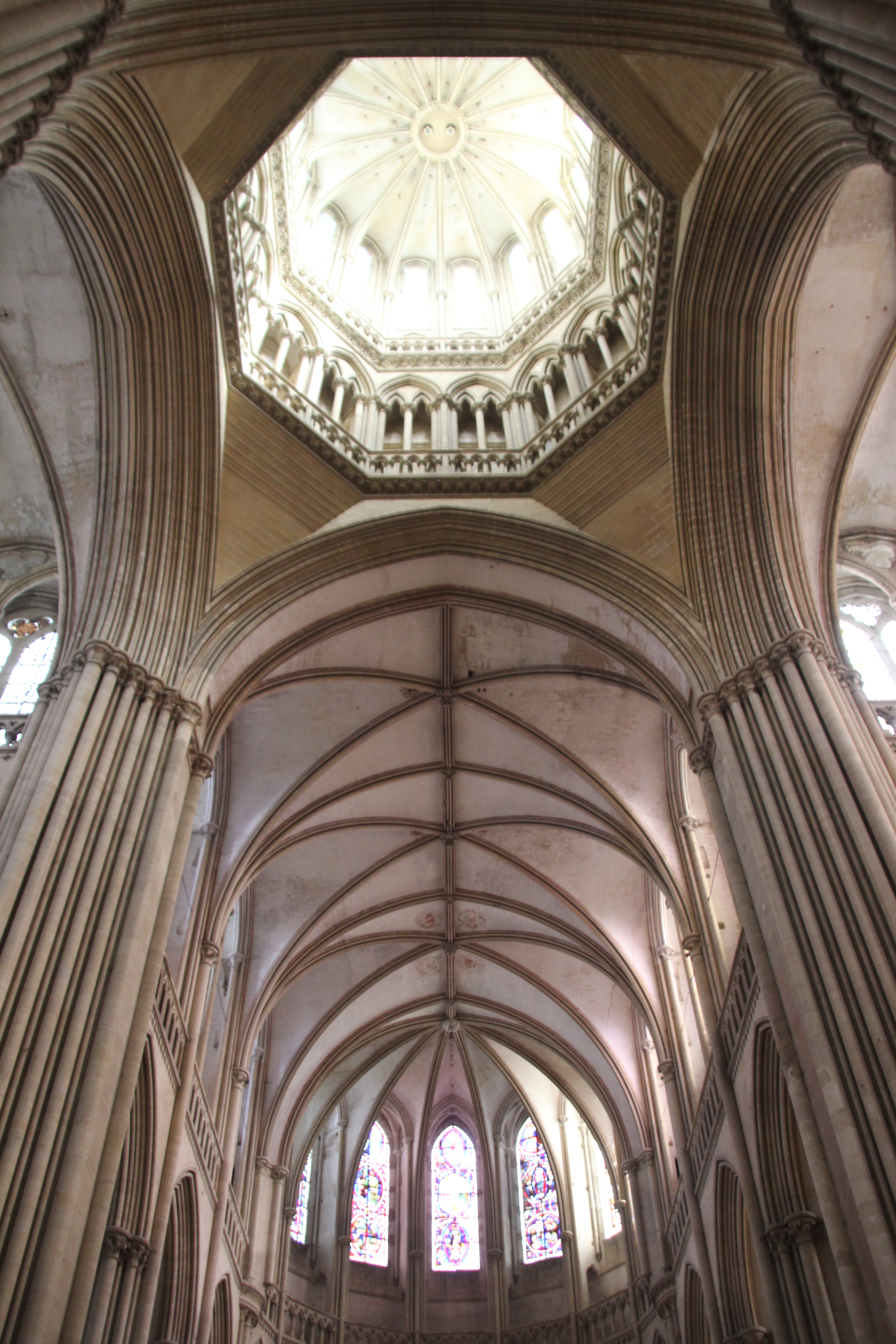
Vaults and lantern tower of Coutances Cathedral in Normandy (1210–1274)

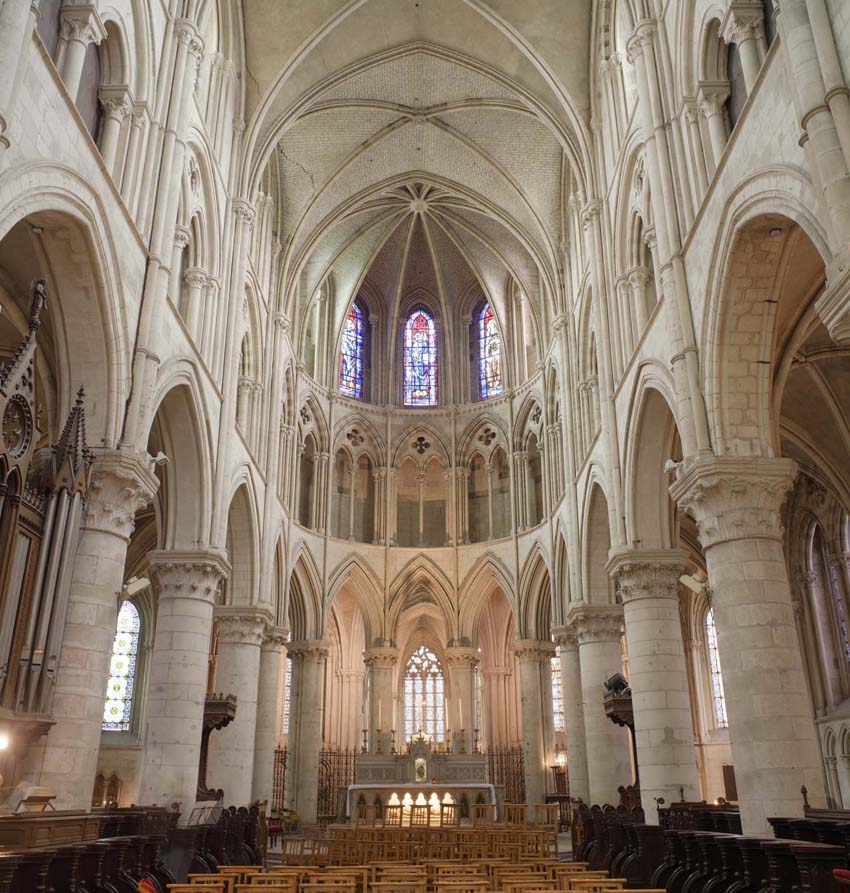
Choir of Lisieux Cathedral

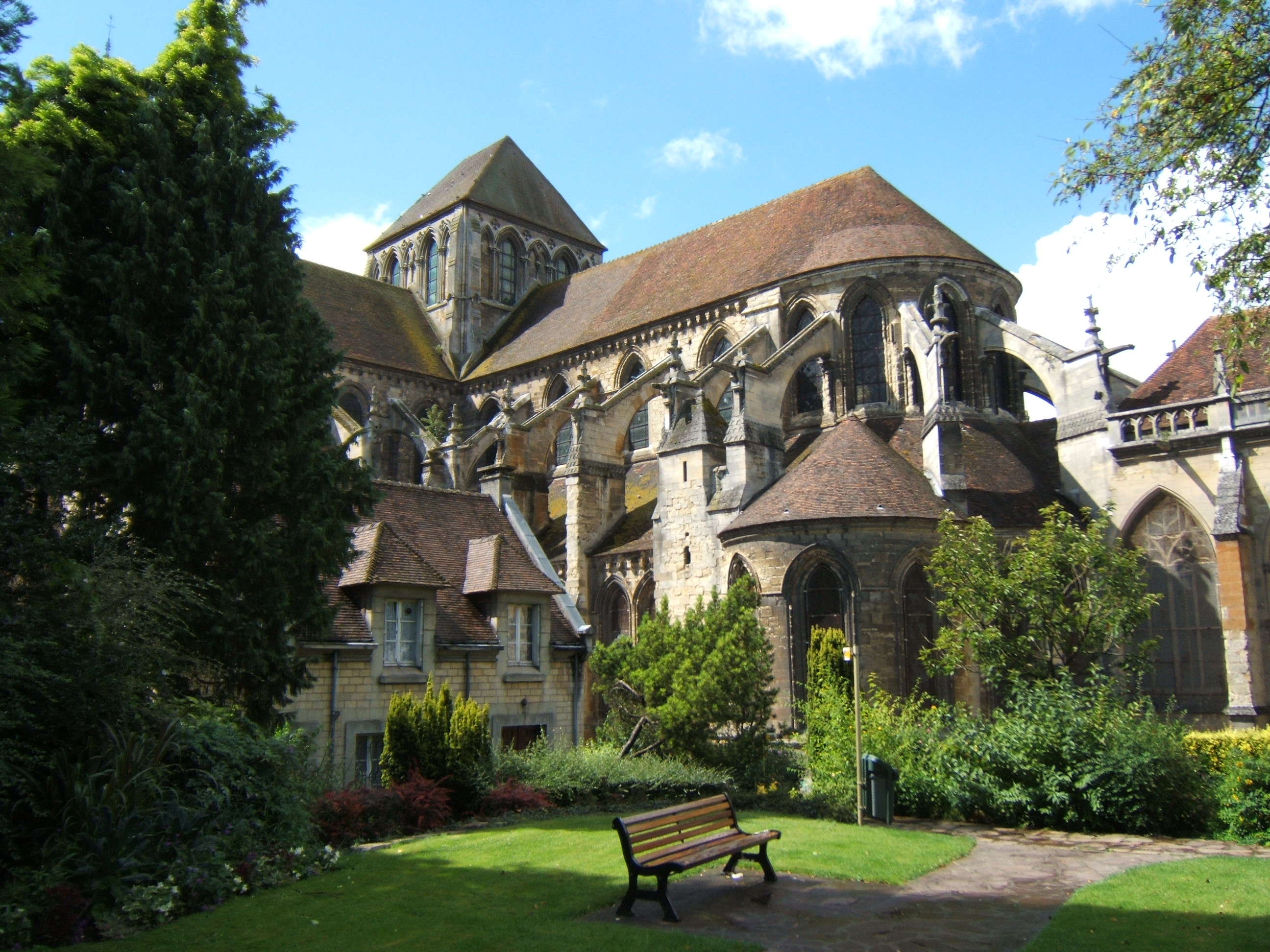
Exterior of Lisieux Cathedral, with lantern tower and cheviot

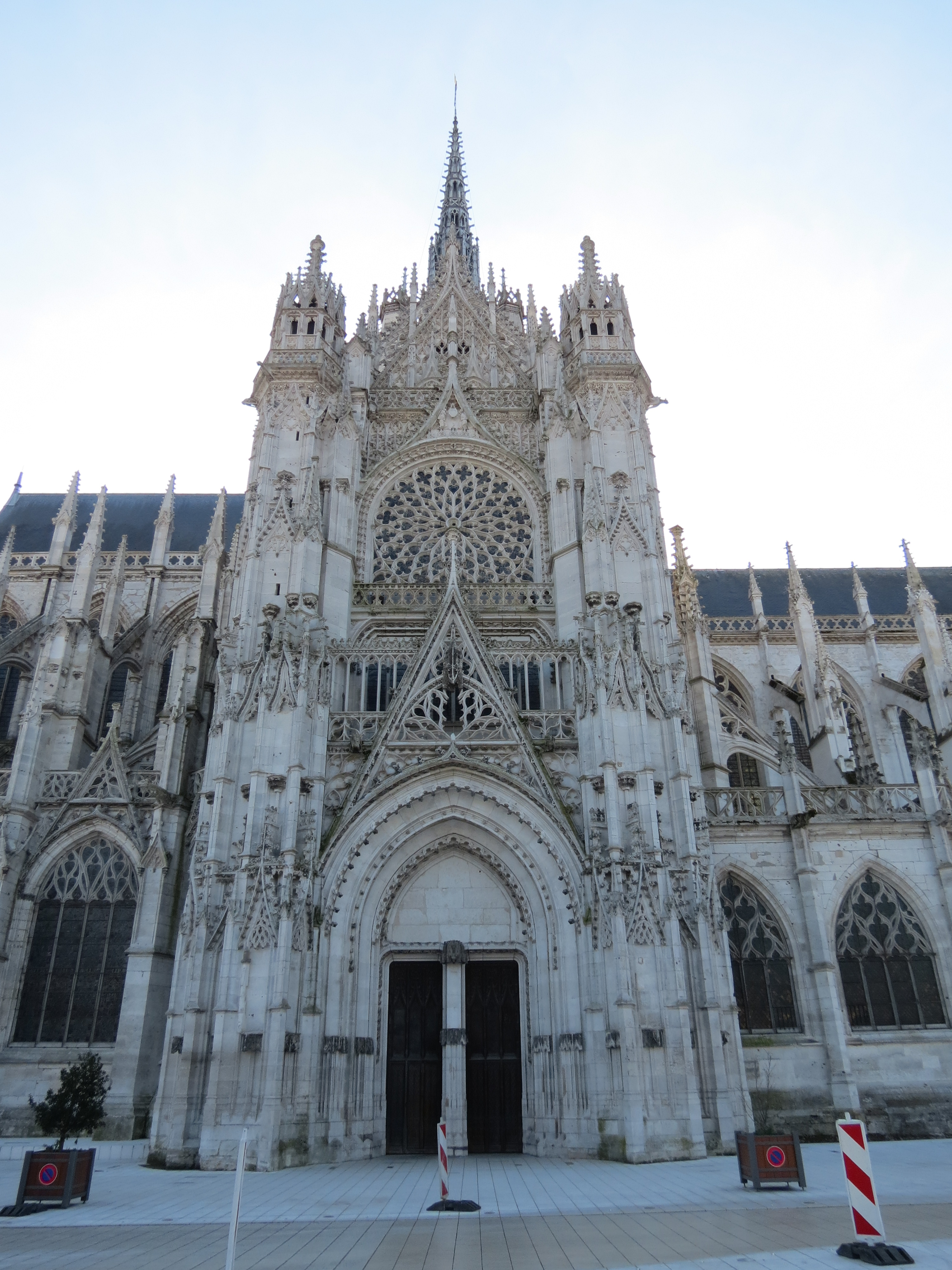
North transept portal of Evreux Cathedral, Normandy.

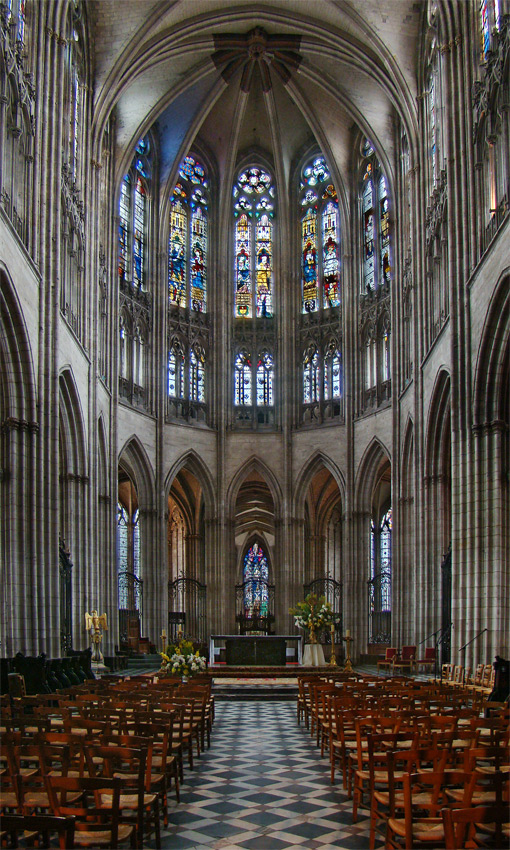
Choir of Evreux Cathedral

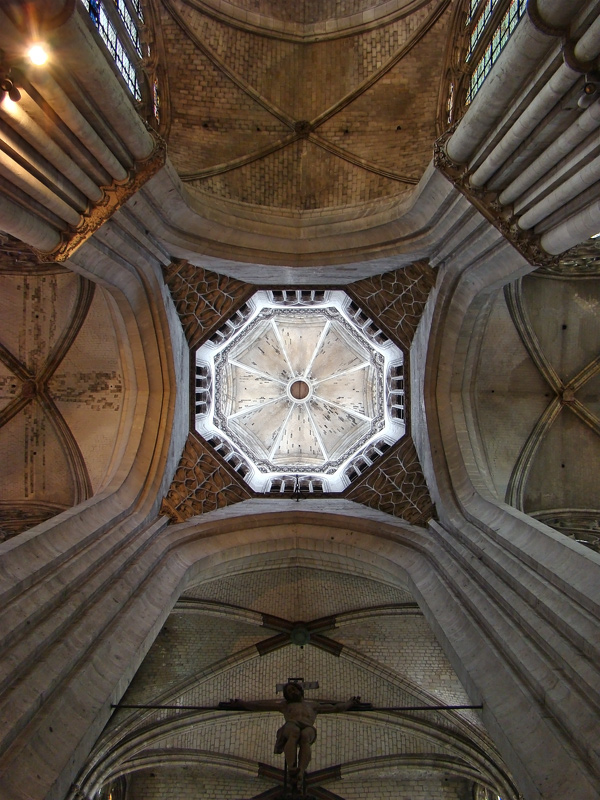
The octagonal central tower of Evreux Cathedral seen from below

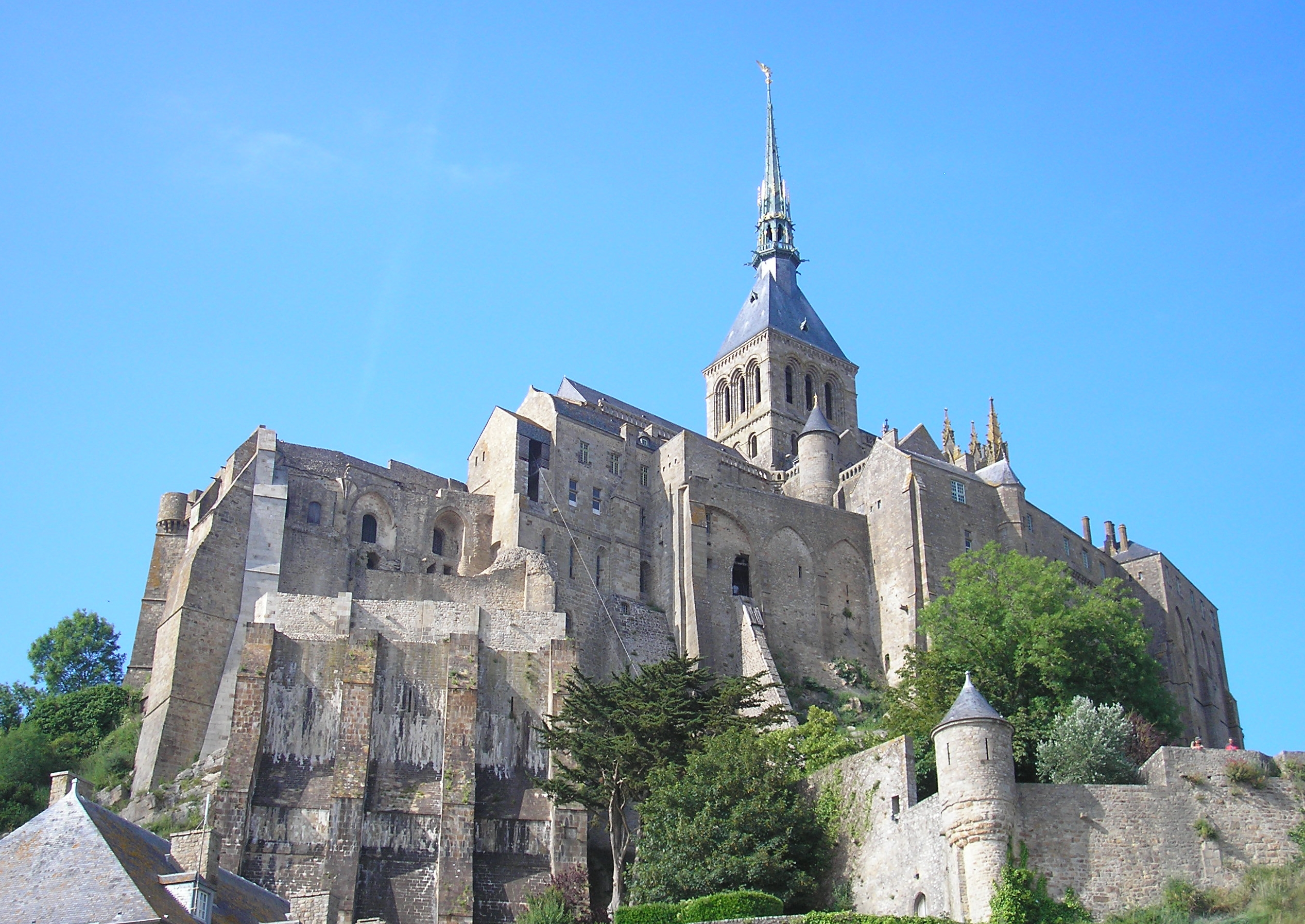
Mont-Saint-Michel Abbey was rebuilt from Romanesque to Gothic in the 12th century.

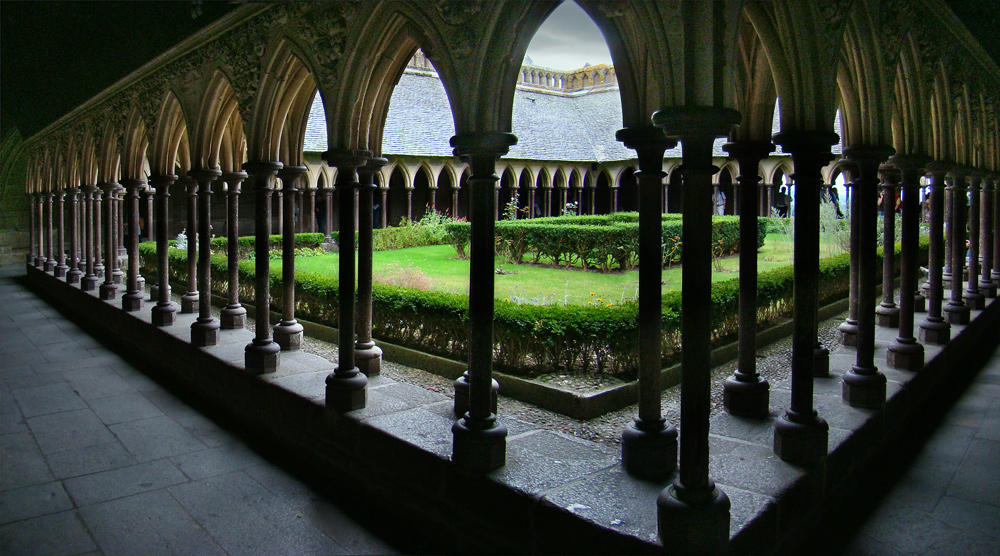
The Gothic cloister of Mont-Saint-Michel Abbey (12th century)

=== Meridional or southern French Gothic ===
- Albi Cathedral. In the southwest of France, Albi Cathedral (begun 1282) is an example of Southern French Gothic. It is built entirely of brick, due to the shortage of suitable stone. In place of flying buttresses, it uses semicircular tower-like supports the height of the building. It is austere in form, with no transept, There is a tower, but a minimum of other decoration. It is massive in size, 113 meters long, 35 meters wide and 30 meters high. The interior is filled with carved stalls and works of polychrome sculpture, largely in their original state.
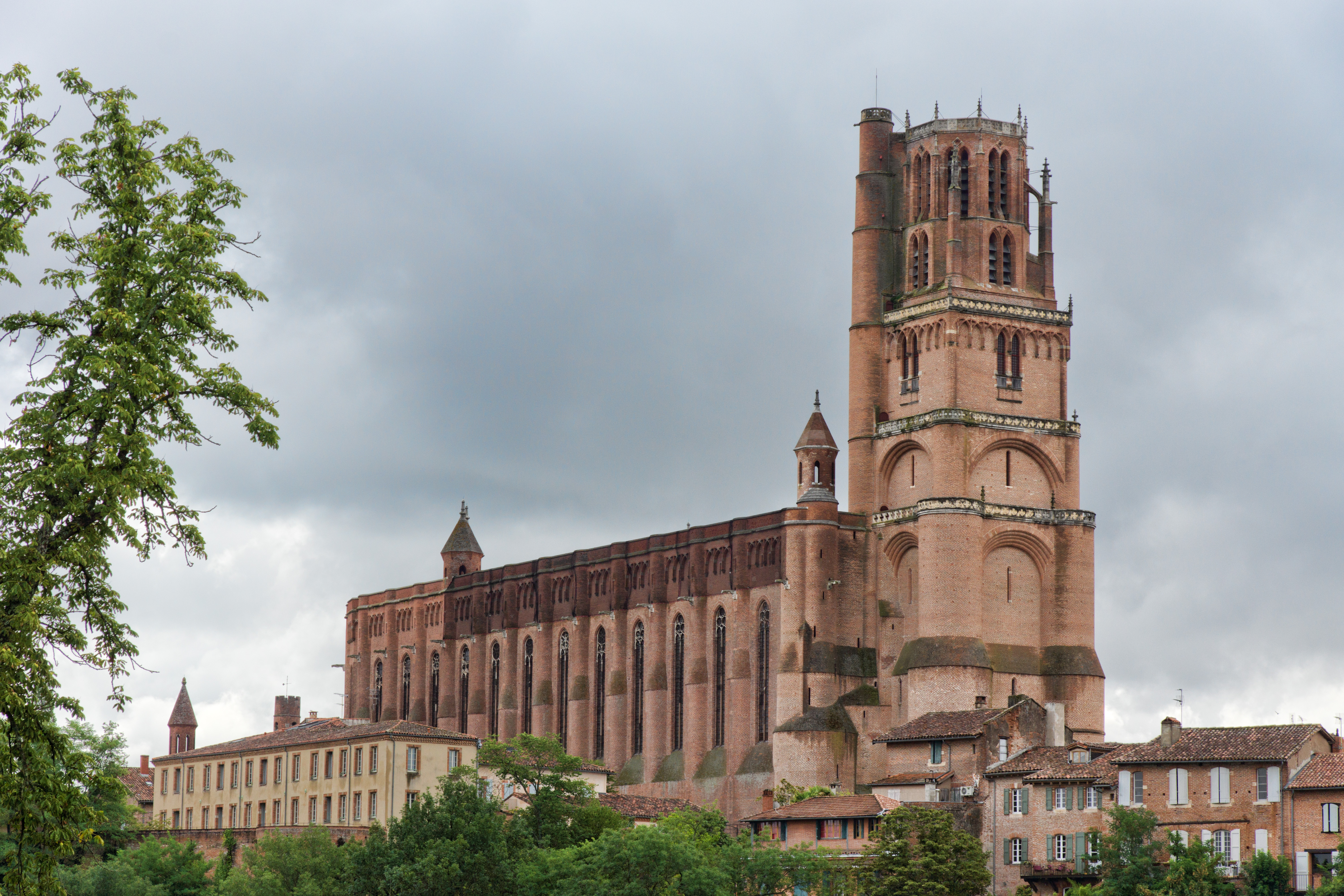
Exterior of Albi Cathedral (begun 1222)

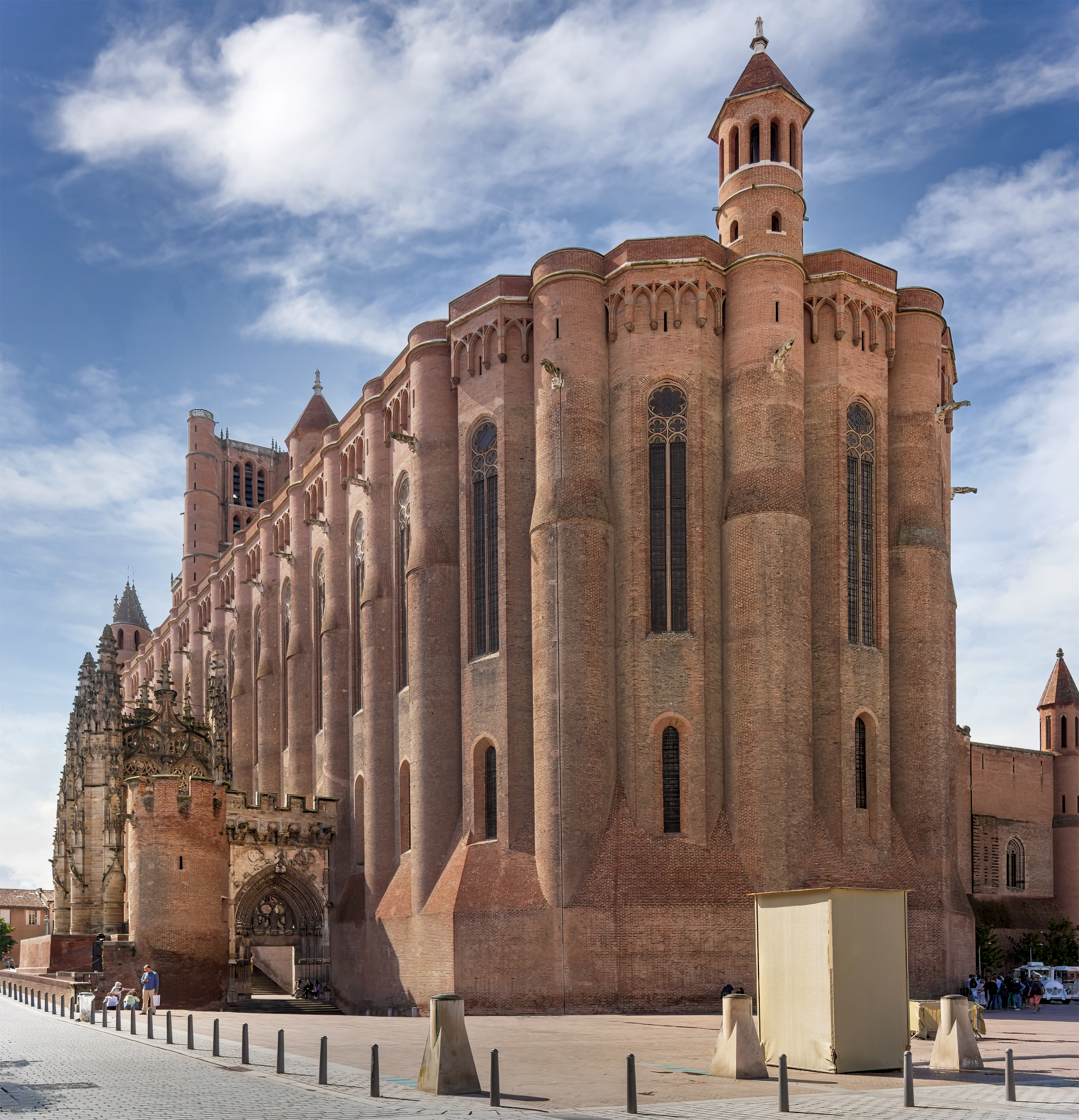
Exterior of the apse of Albi Cathedral

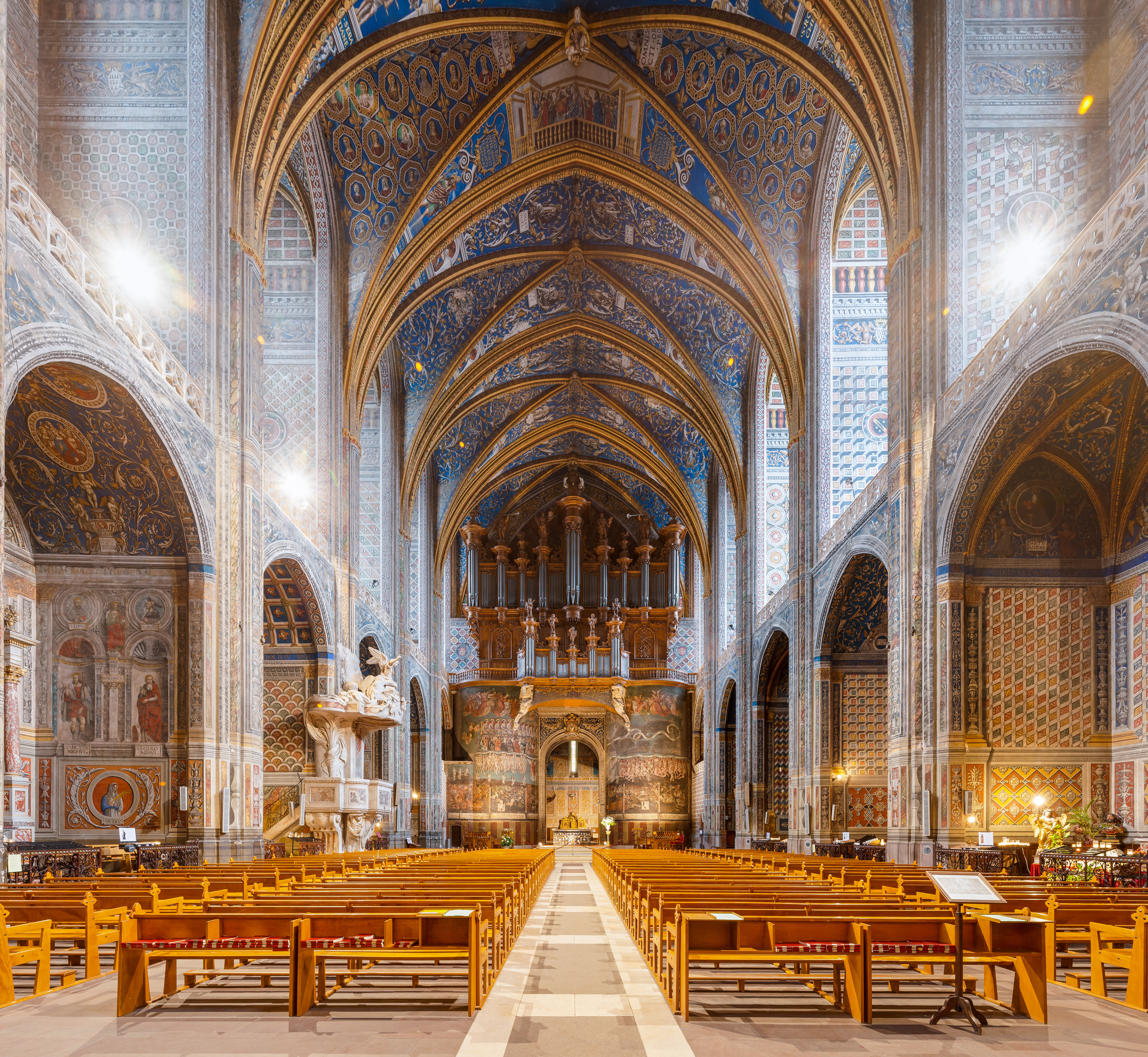
The colorful interior of Albi Cathedral

== England – Decorated Gothic ==
In England, the second period of Gothic cathedrals is often called Decorated Gothic, as the decoration inside and outside became more elaborate, blurred the lines and overshadowed the architecture. It lasted from about the mid-thirteenth to the mid-fourteenth century. The simple and functional quadrapartite rib vault was replaced by more elaborate lierne vault and fan fault, whose ribs were largely decorative.

Henry III of England (1207–72) was an important patron of this new style, both with additions to Westminster Abbey (after 1245) and in the east end of Saint Paul's Cathedral (1258). Some of his projects appear to have been be inspired by Sainte-Chapelle in France, built by Henry's brother-in-law, Louis IX of France. The second part of this period in England is often called Perpendicular, because of its strong emphasis on the appearance of height.

- Wells Cathedral (1176–1445) has features that illustrate almost all the periods of Gothic architecture. Construction began in about 1175, after the Bishop, Reginald de Bohan, visited France and saw the early Gothic works. It was the first English cathedral to be Gothic from the beginning. Following the early Gothic style, it originally stressed width rather than height. The major achievement was the west front (1225–1240, decorated with 400 statues, of which 3200 still exist, depicting the Day of Judgement from the Book of Revelation. The statues were originally painted in bright colours. In the early 14th century, following changes in the liturgy, the Cathedral saw major additions in the decorated style, which were finished in 1326. These included the addition of a new octagonal chapel, and a retro-choir with unusual scissor arches, built in 1338–48 to strengthen the support of the tower above. A major new building program began at Wells in the fourteenth century, finishing in 1326. Innovations included an unusual retro-choir, in an octagonal shape, with the very decorative Lierne vault.
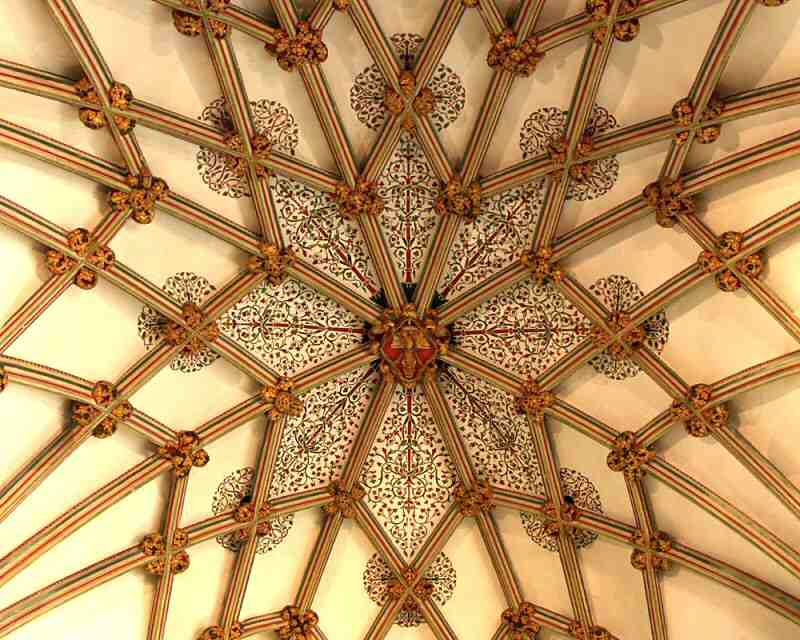
Stellar vault of the Lady Chapel

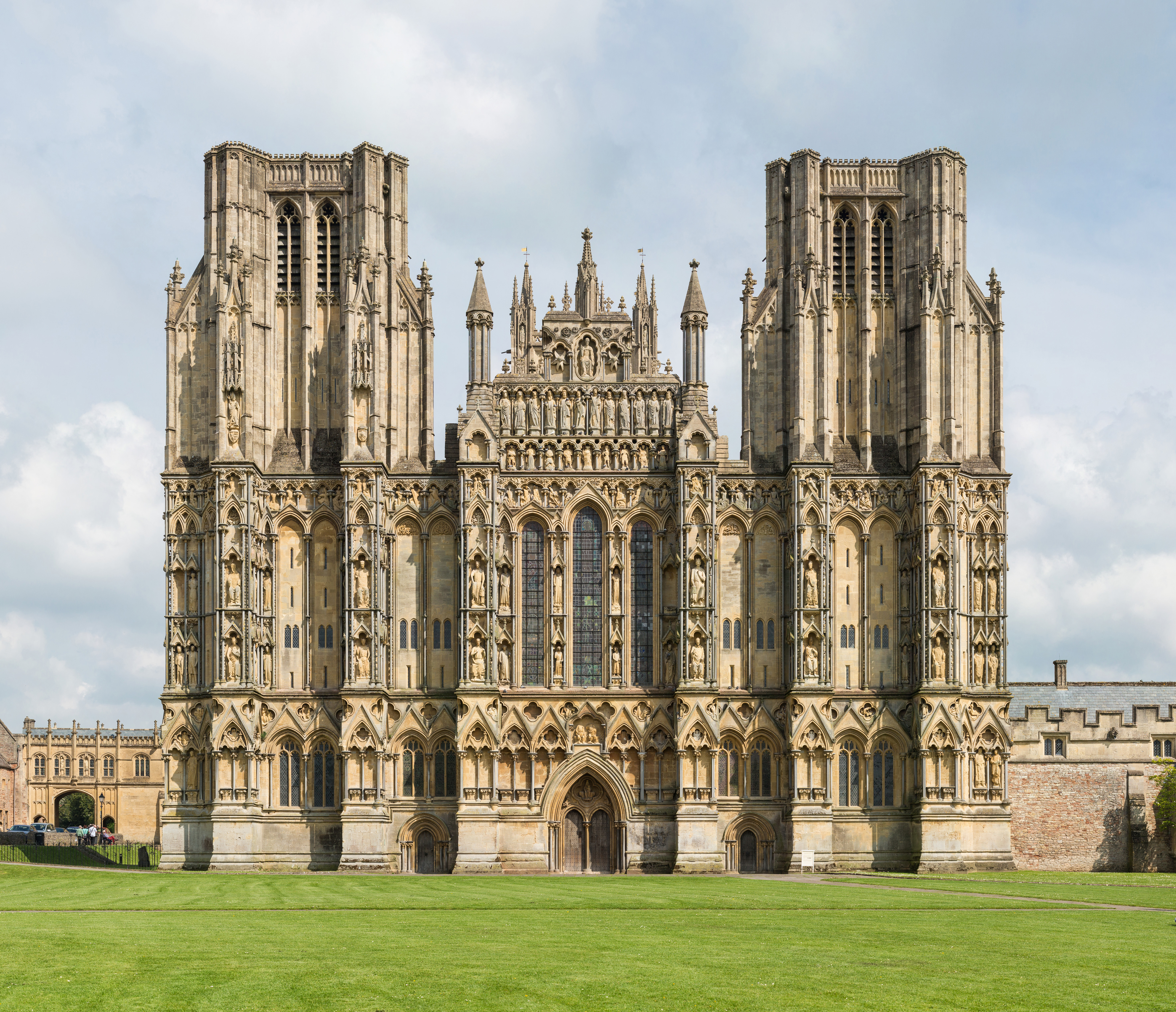
West front of Wells Cathedral, decorated with four hundred statues

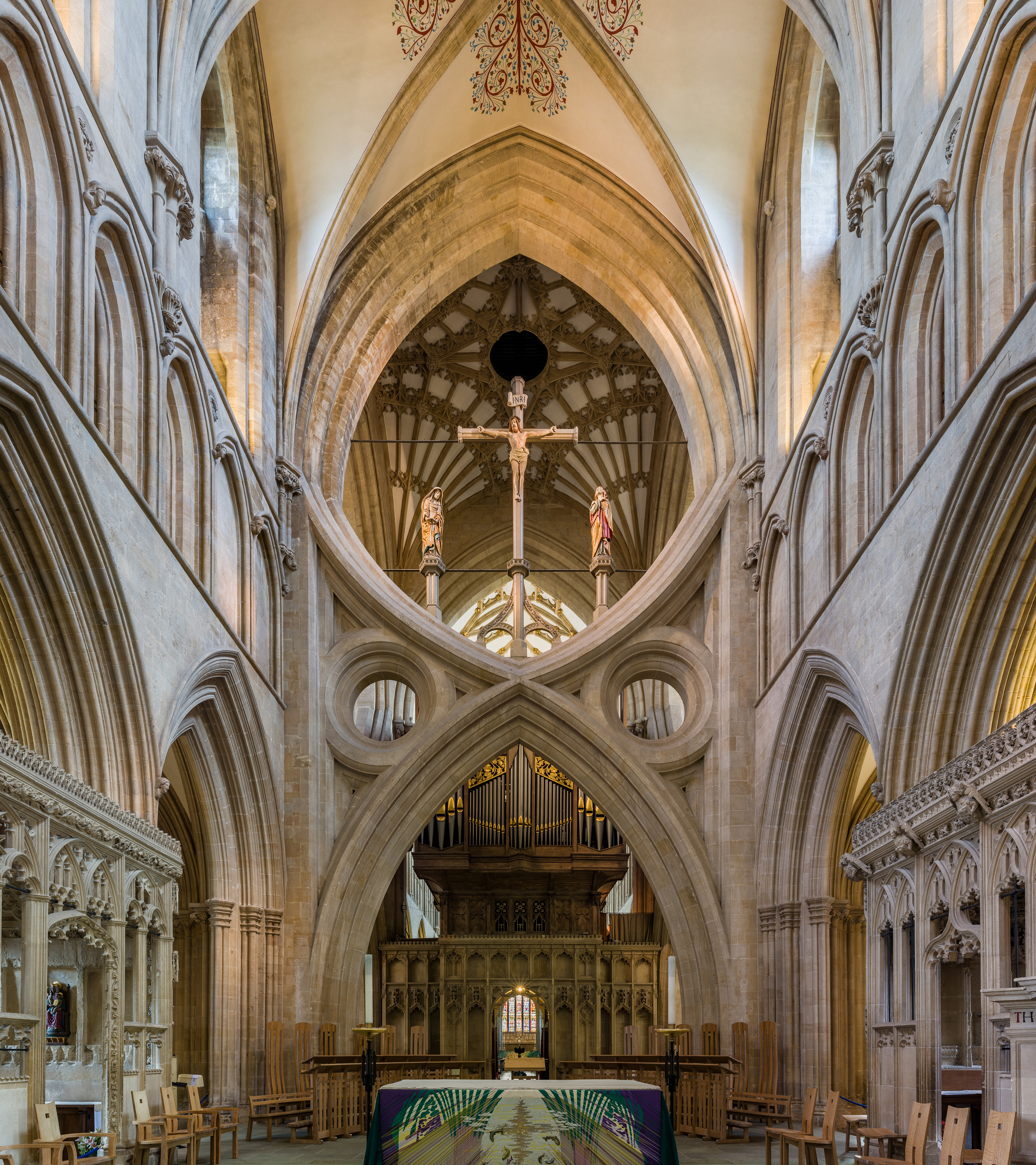
Scissor arches, built to reinforce the tower above (1338–48)

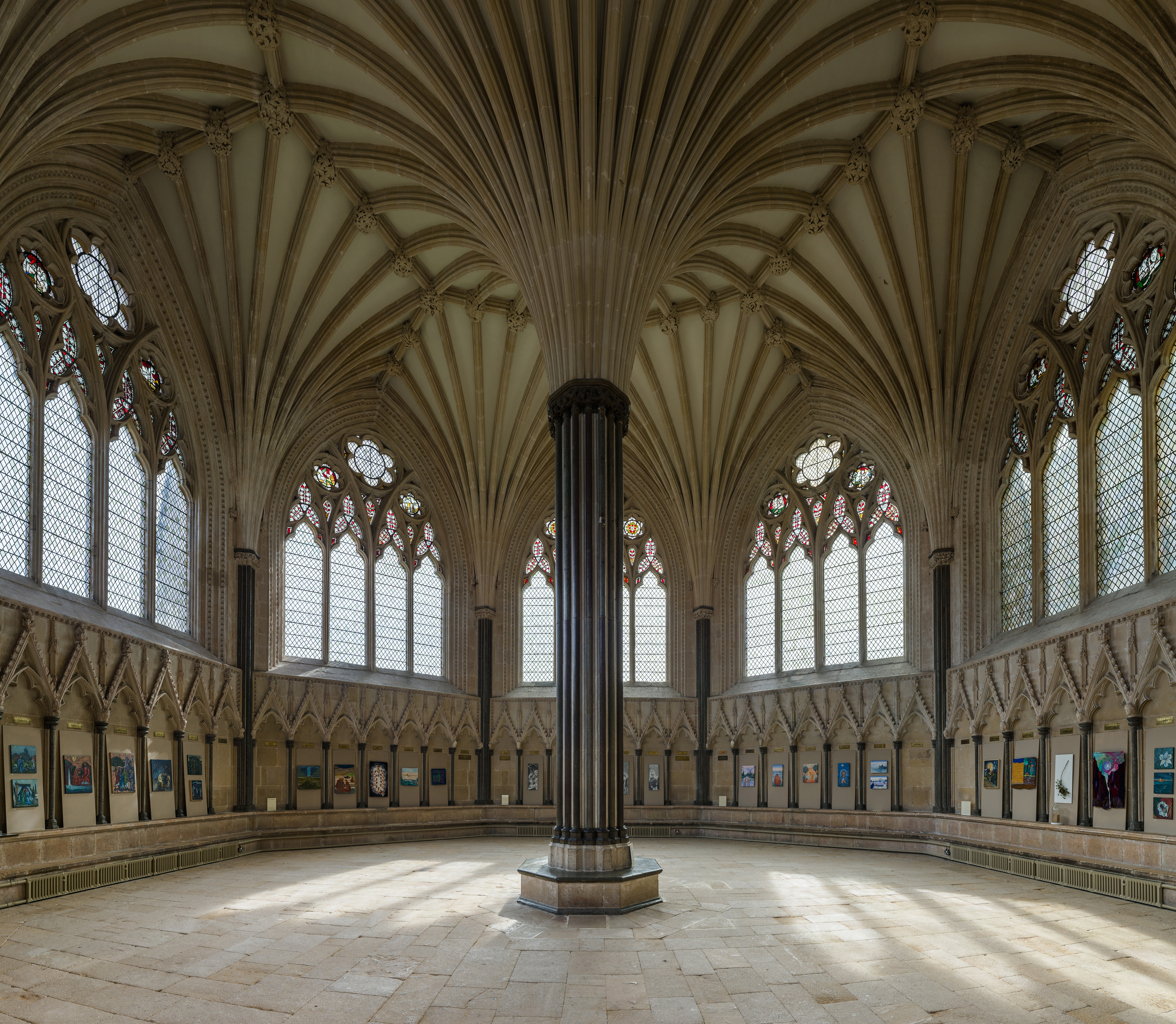
The octagonal Chapter House, with vaults like palm trees
- Lincoln Cathedral . The (Angel Choir), (begun 1256, dedicated in 1280) was a notable early example of decorated Gothic. The new style was expressed in decorative ribs of the lierne vaults and especially in the elaborate tracery of the stained glass windows.
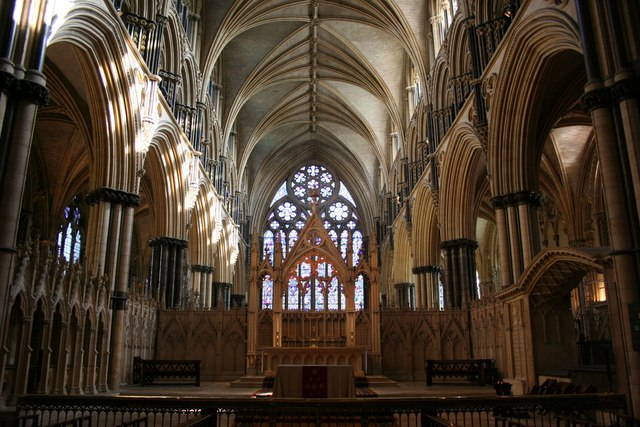
The Angel Choir of Lincoln Cathedral (1256–1280)

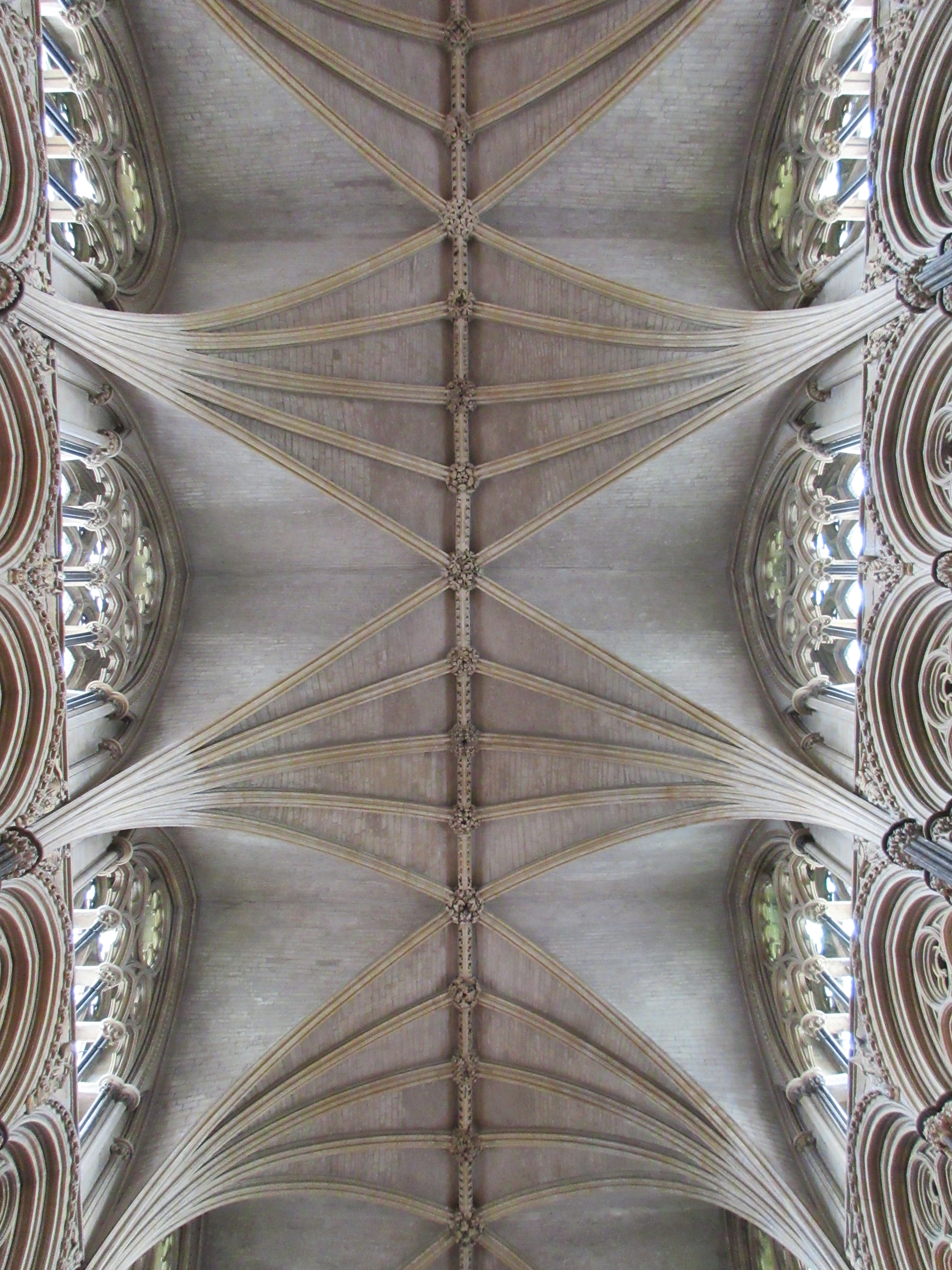
Vault of the Angel Choir (1256–1280)

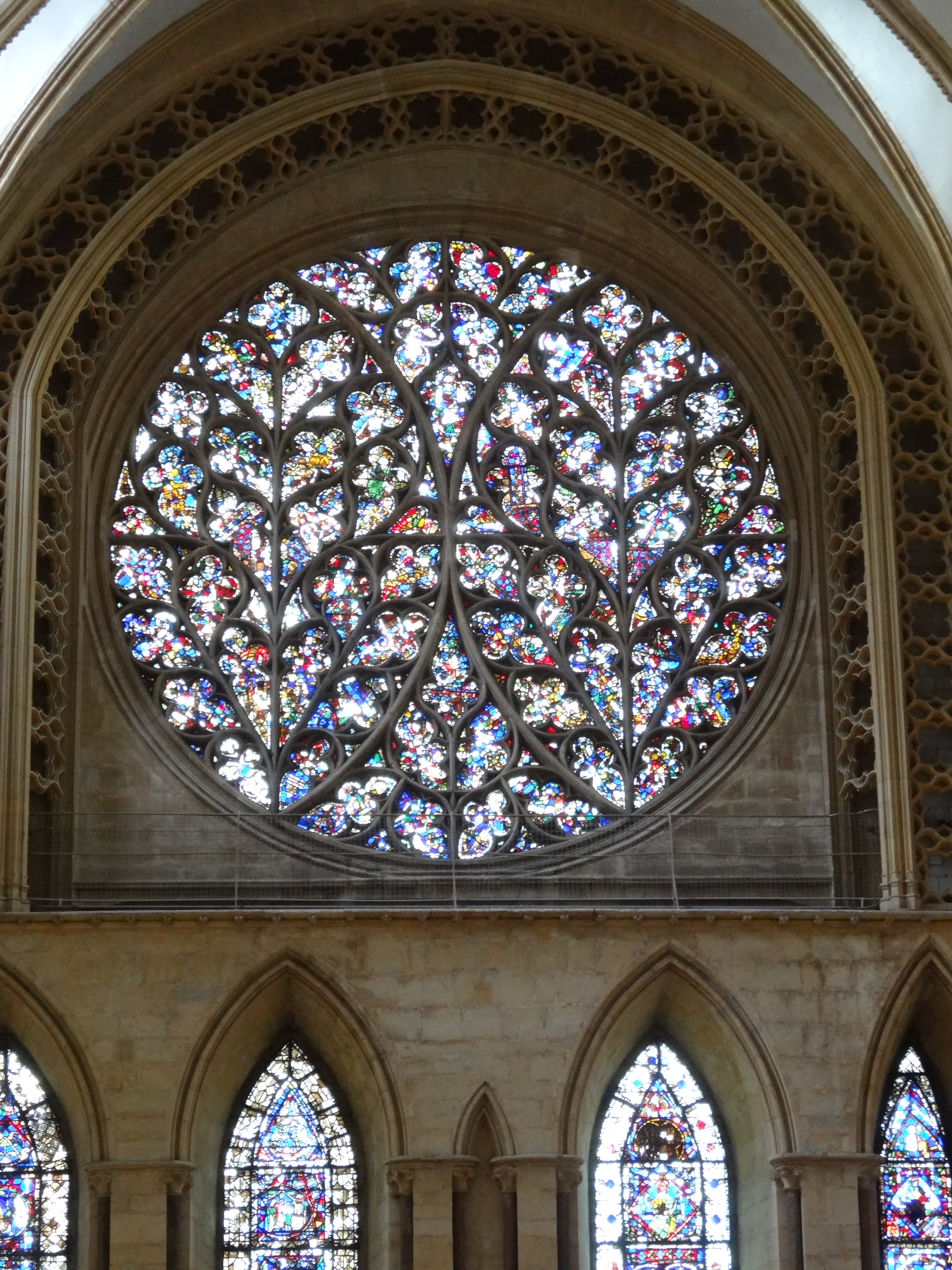
Bishop's Eye Window (1256–80), noted for its elaborate tracery
- York Minster was reconstructed beginning in 1220 on the foundations of the old Norman cathedral, with the intention of rivalling Canterbury Cathedral, then under construction. The new nave, in the perpendicular style, was not begun until 1280, and the ornate vaulting was not finished until 1360.
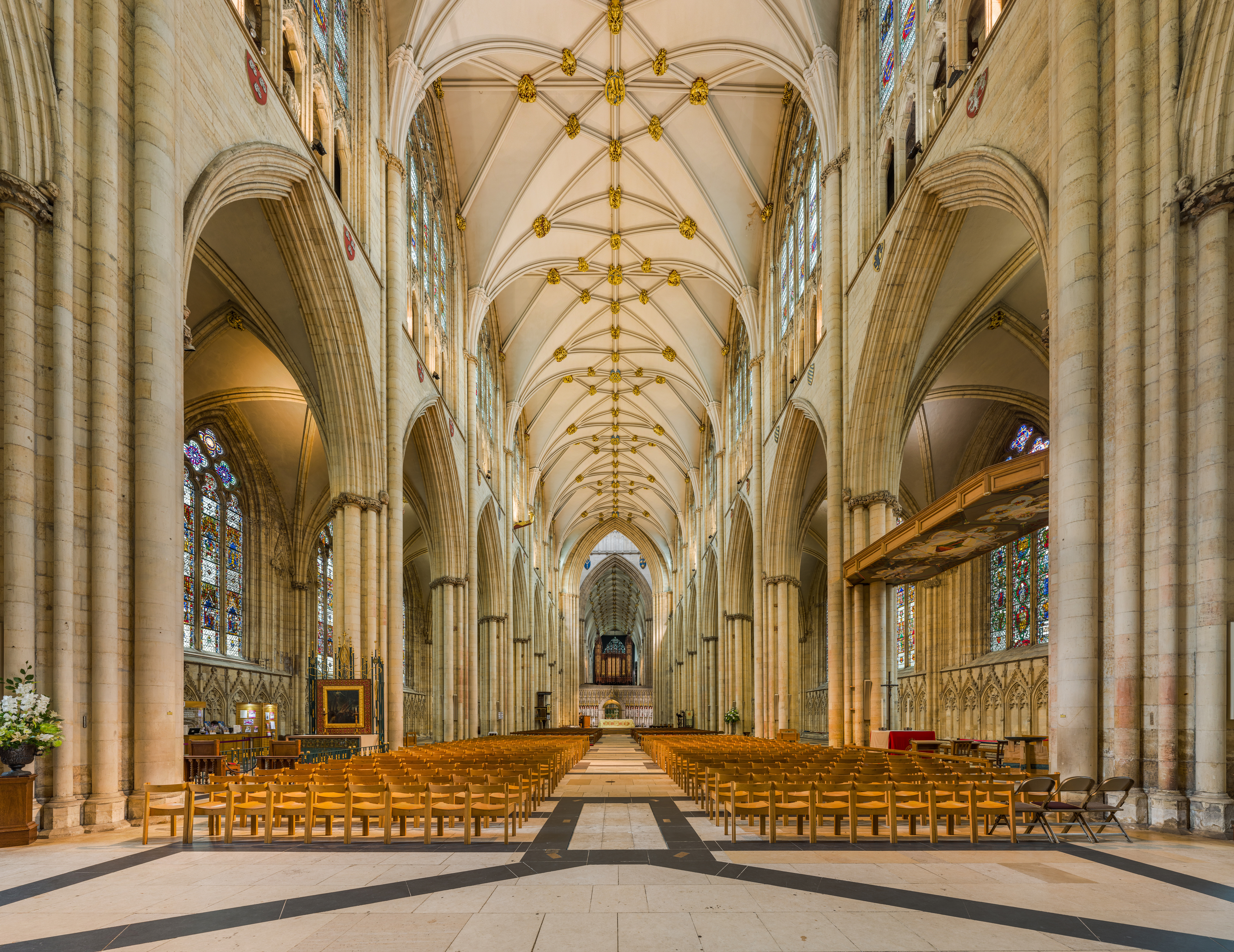
Nave of York Minster in the perpendicular style (1280–1360)

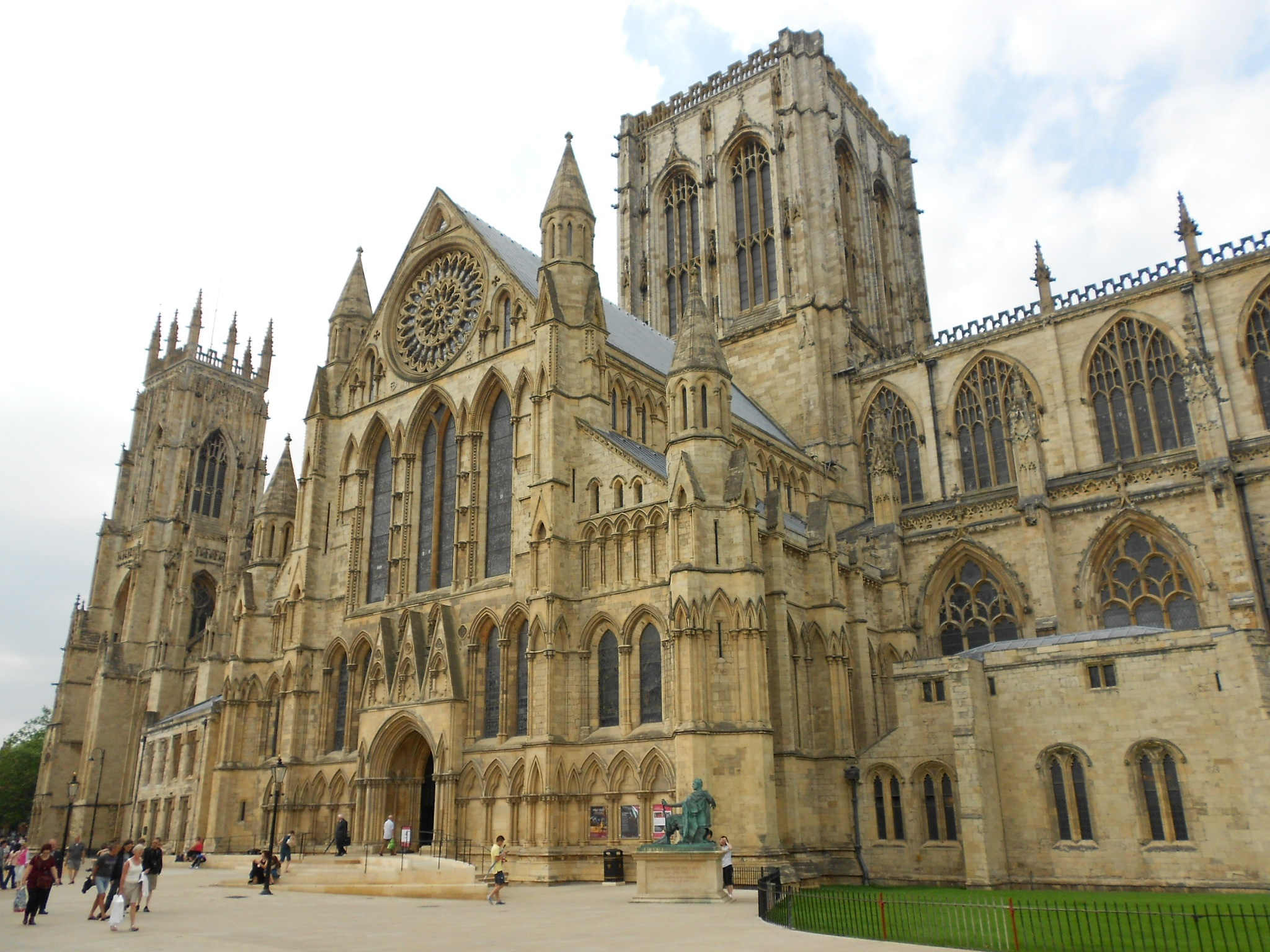
South transept and rose window of York Minster

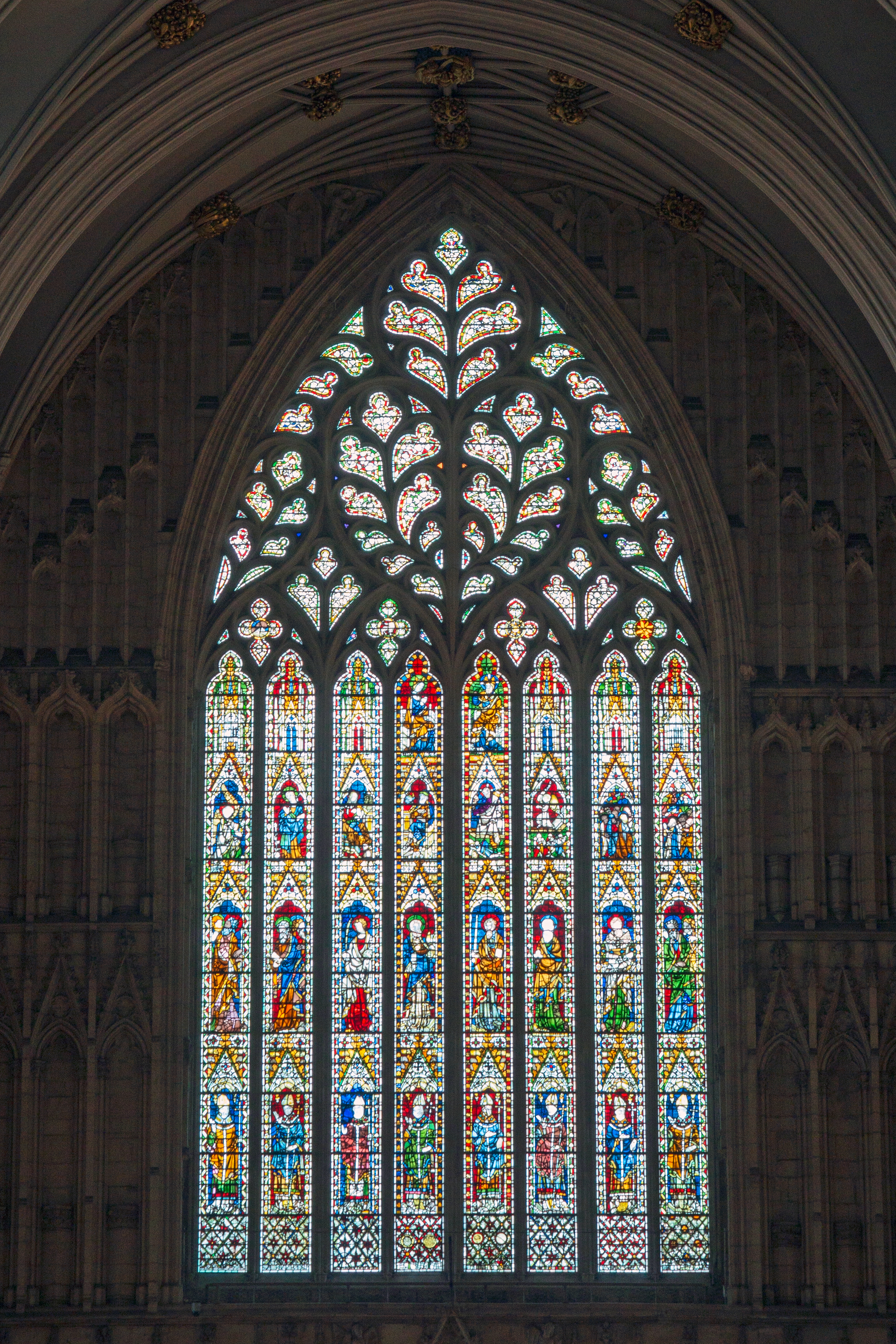
The great west window of York Minster
- Exeter Cathedral (1112–1400) was built in Norman style in 1133, then rebuilt in Decorated Style beginning in 1258. It was constructed with local stone, including Purbeck Marble. Completed in 1400, it claims to have the longest uninterrupted vaulted ceiling of any Gothic cathedral.
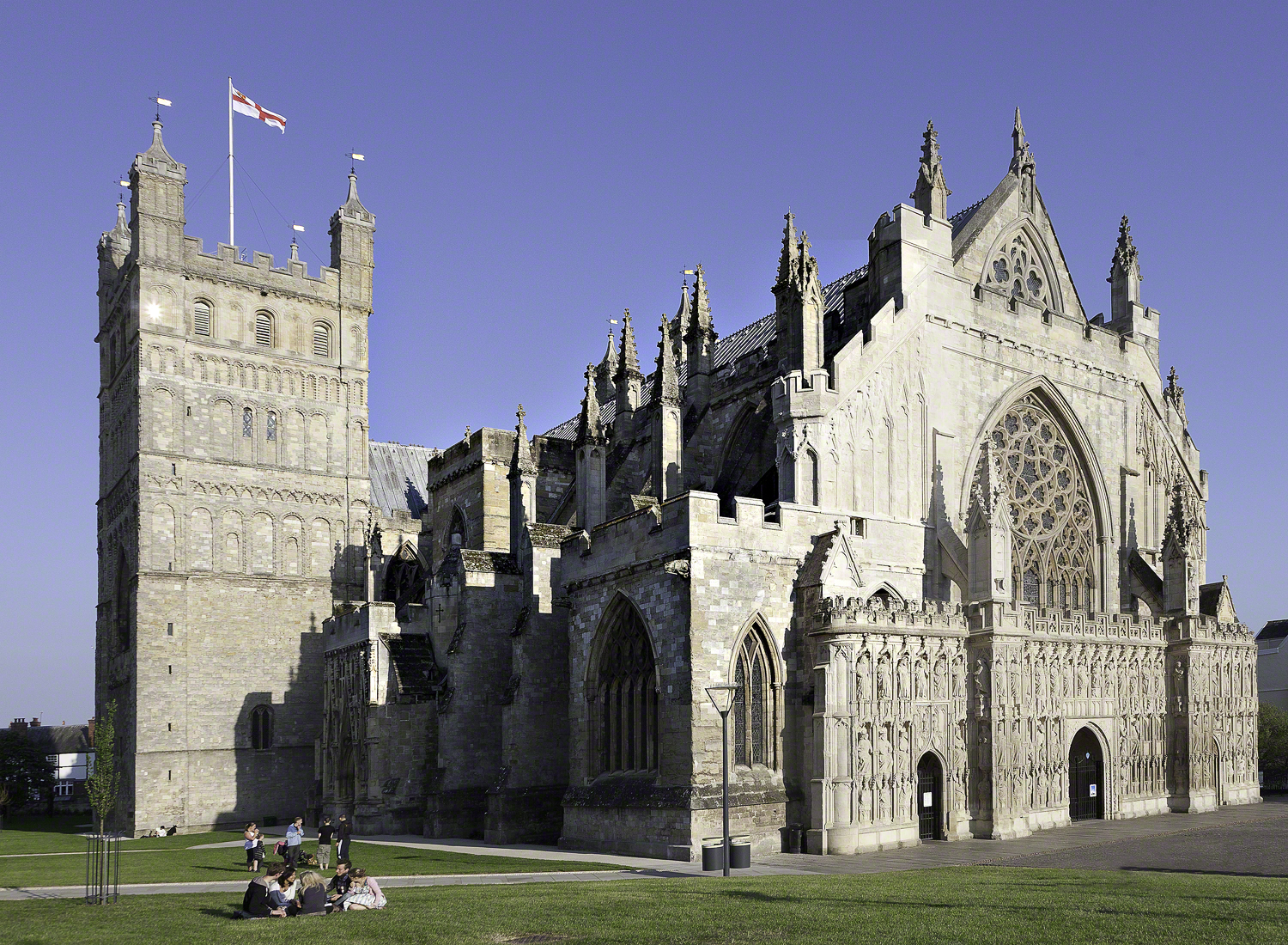
Exterior of Exeter Cathedral

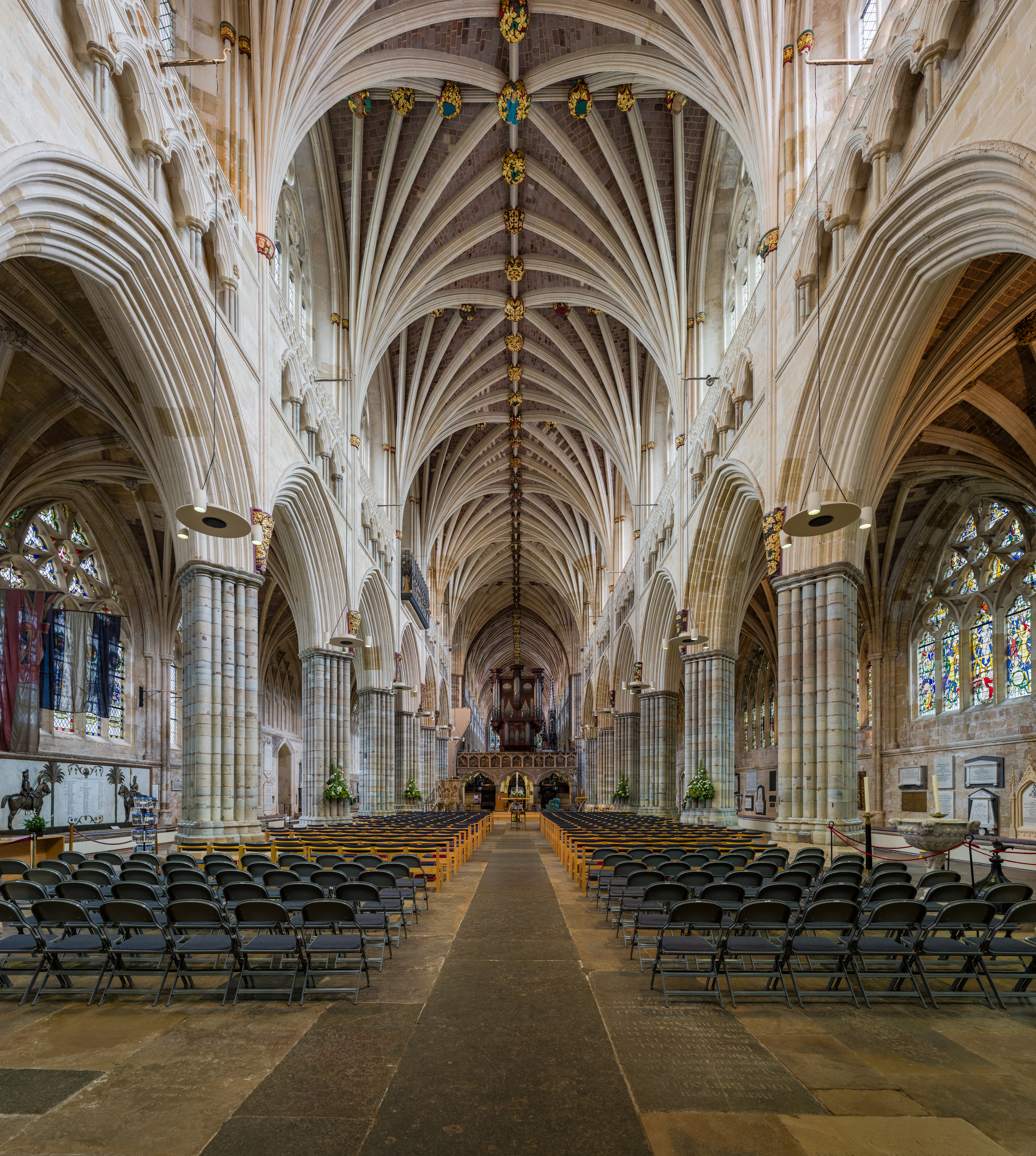
The nave of Exeter Cathedral

== The Holy Roman Empire – Strasbourg, Cologne, Prague ==
- Strasbourg Cathedral (1176–1459) in Alsace, then separate from France and part of the Holy Roman Empire, was begun after a fire destroyed the earlier Romanesque cathedral. The rebuilding began in the original Romanesque style, but when the builders saw the new French style at Chartres, they changed their plans and began anew. The south transept was completed first, then the nave, completed in 1275. They built on top of the original Romanesque foundations, which accounts for the unusually wide spacing of the pillars of the grand arcades. The façade was begun in 1277, using the reddish sandstone of the Vosges mountains. A spire was added to the north tower, completed in 1439. At 142 meters, it is the highest still existing medieval spire.
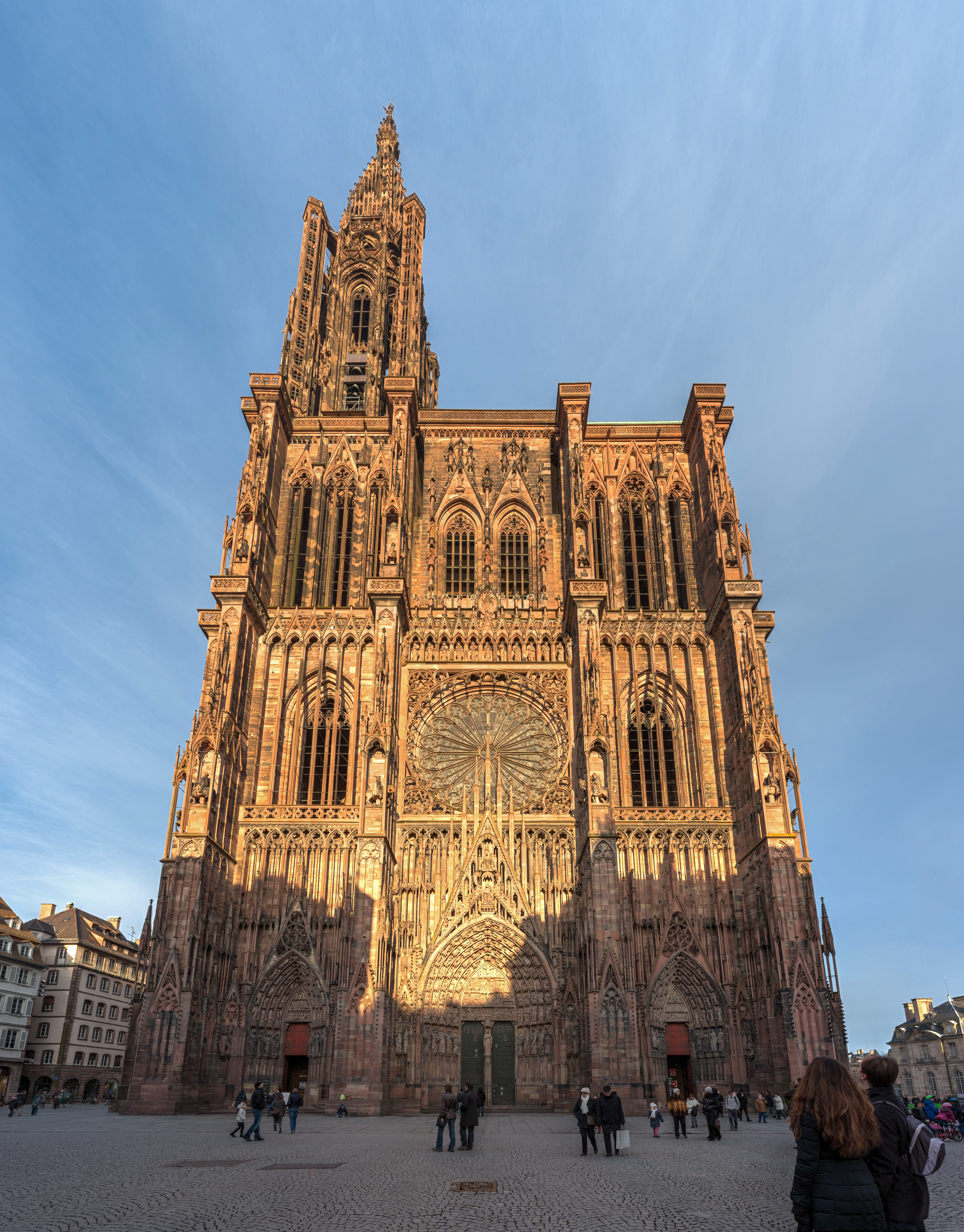
The west front of Strasbourg Cathedral. (1176–1459)

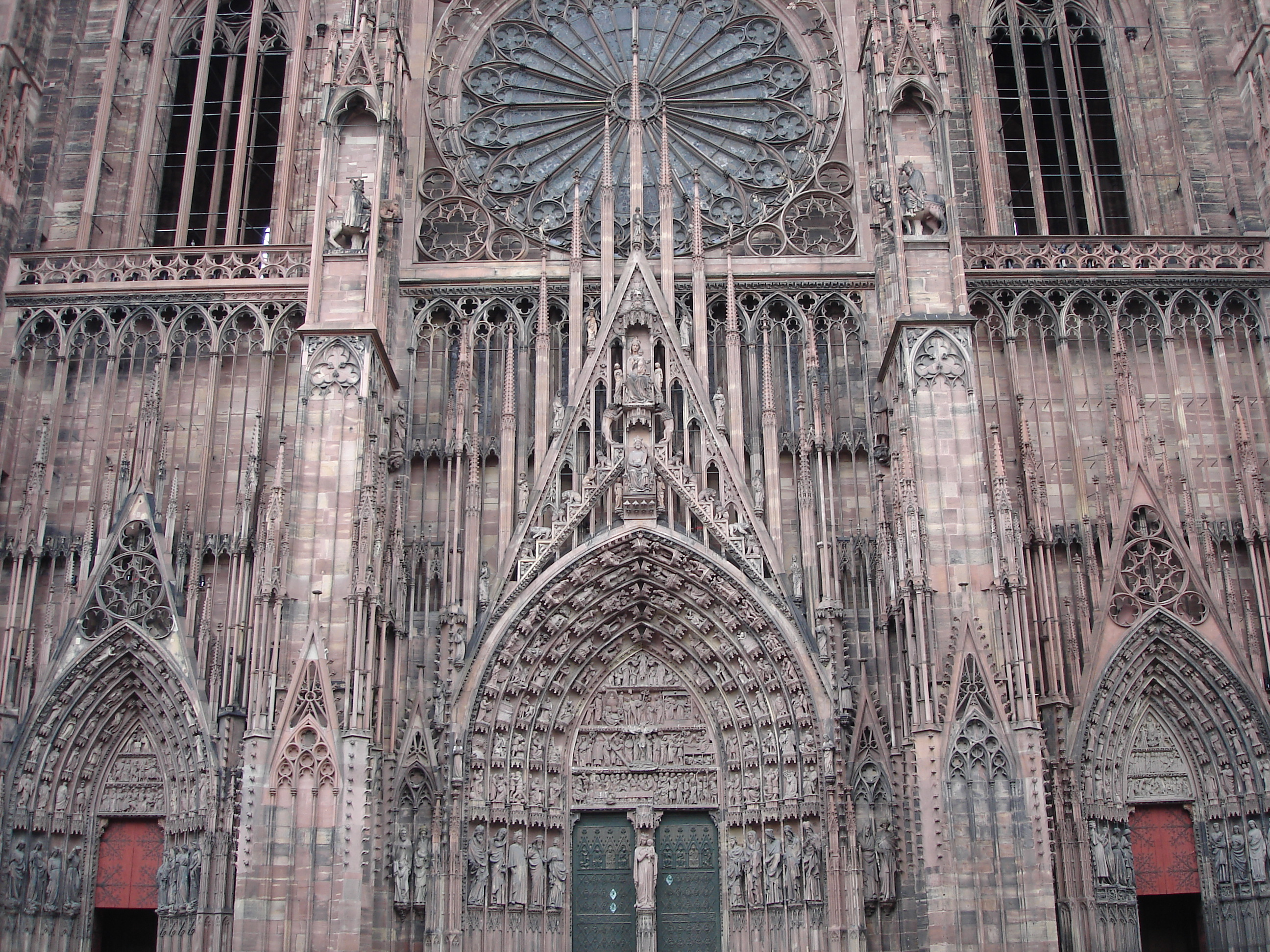
Detail of the west front of Strasbourg Cathedral

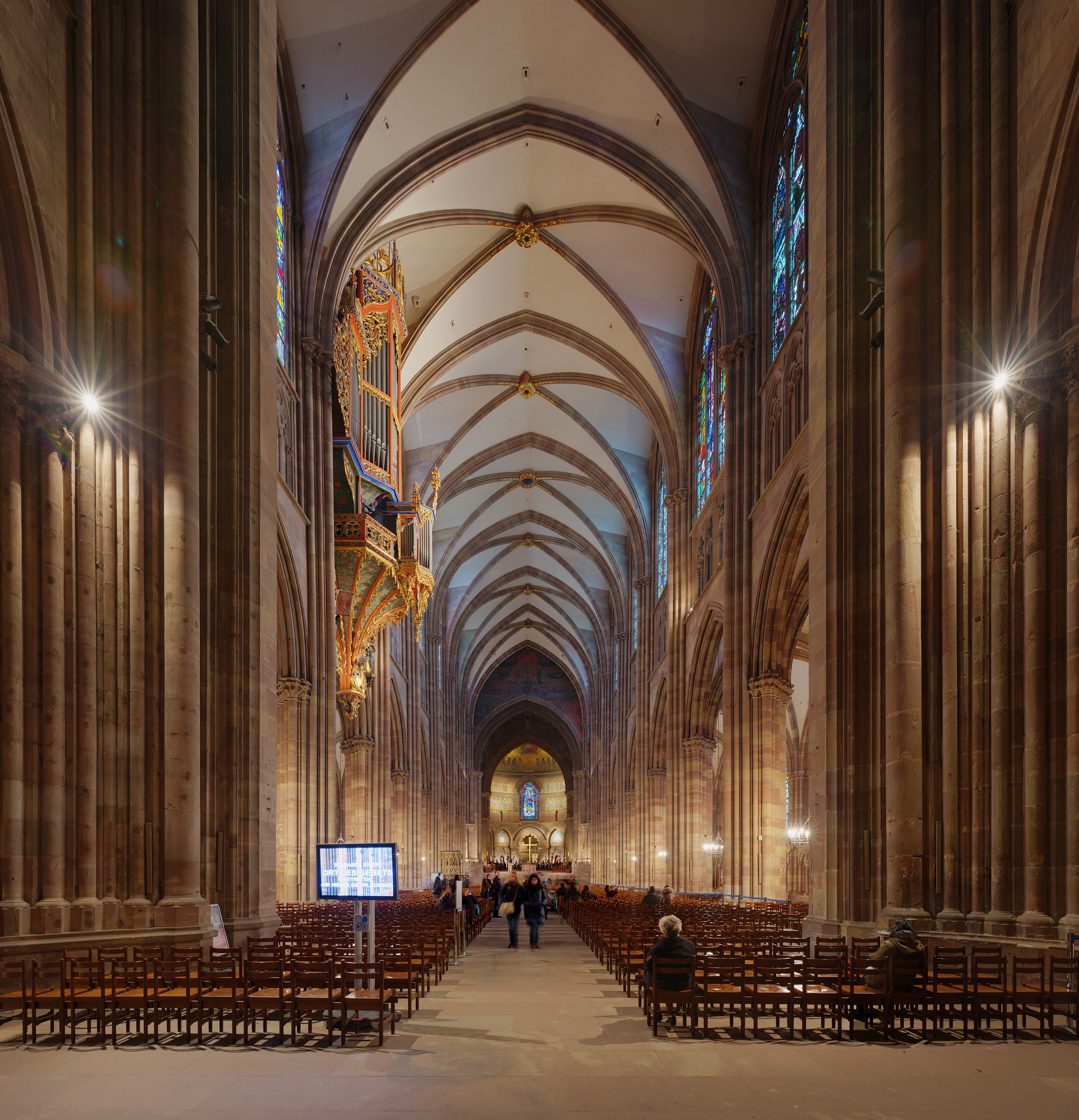
Nave of Strasbourg Cathedral

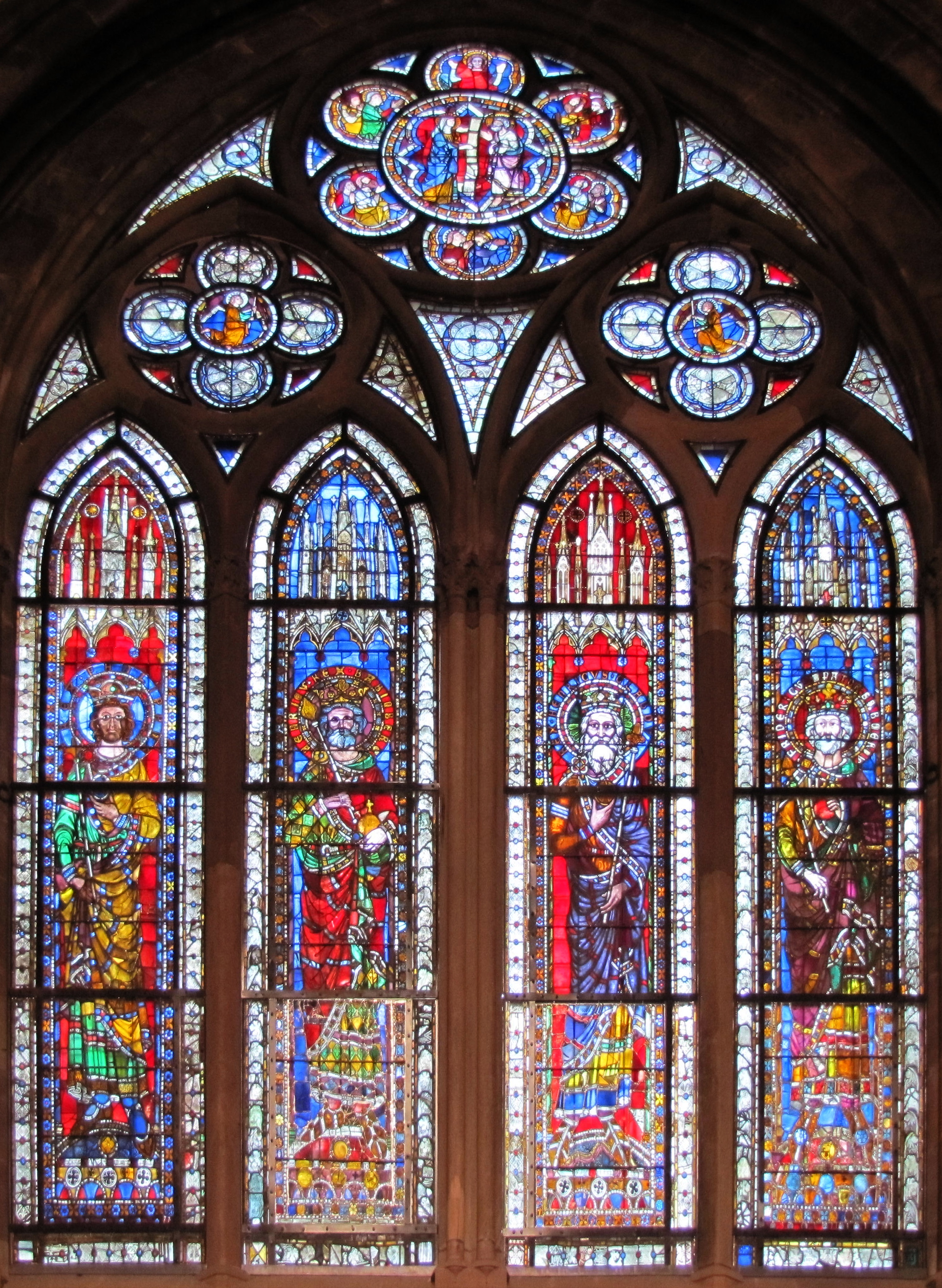
Emperor Windows (1210–1270)
- Cologne Cathedral was begun in 1248 as a pilgrimage site whose attraction was a reliquary of the Biblical Three Kings. An earlier cathedral on the same site since 1176 had been destroyed by fire in 1248. The choir was completed in 1320 and the cathedral was consecrated in 1322. Work continued until 1560, but then construction ceased, leaving it unfinished until 1842 when work recommenced. It was finally completed in 1880. The structure was heavily damaged by Allied bombing in World War II, but was back in service by 1948 and restoration was complete by 1956. The cathedral is best known for its gigantic size and height; it is the largest Gothic church in Northern Europe. The nave and choir are 144.5 m (474 ft) long and 86.25 m (283 ft) high. The two towers are 157 m (515 ft) high.
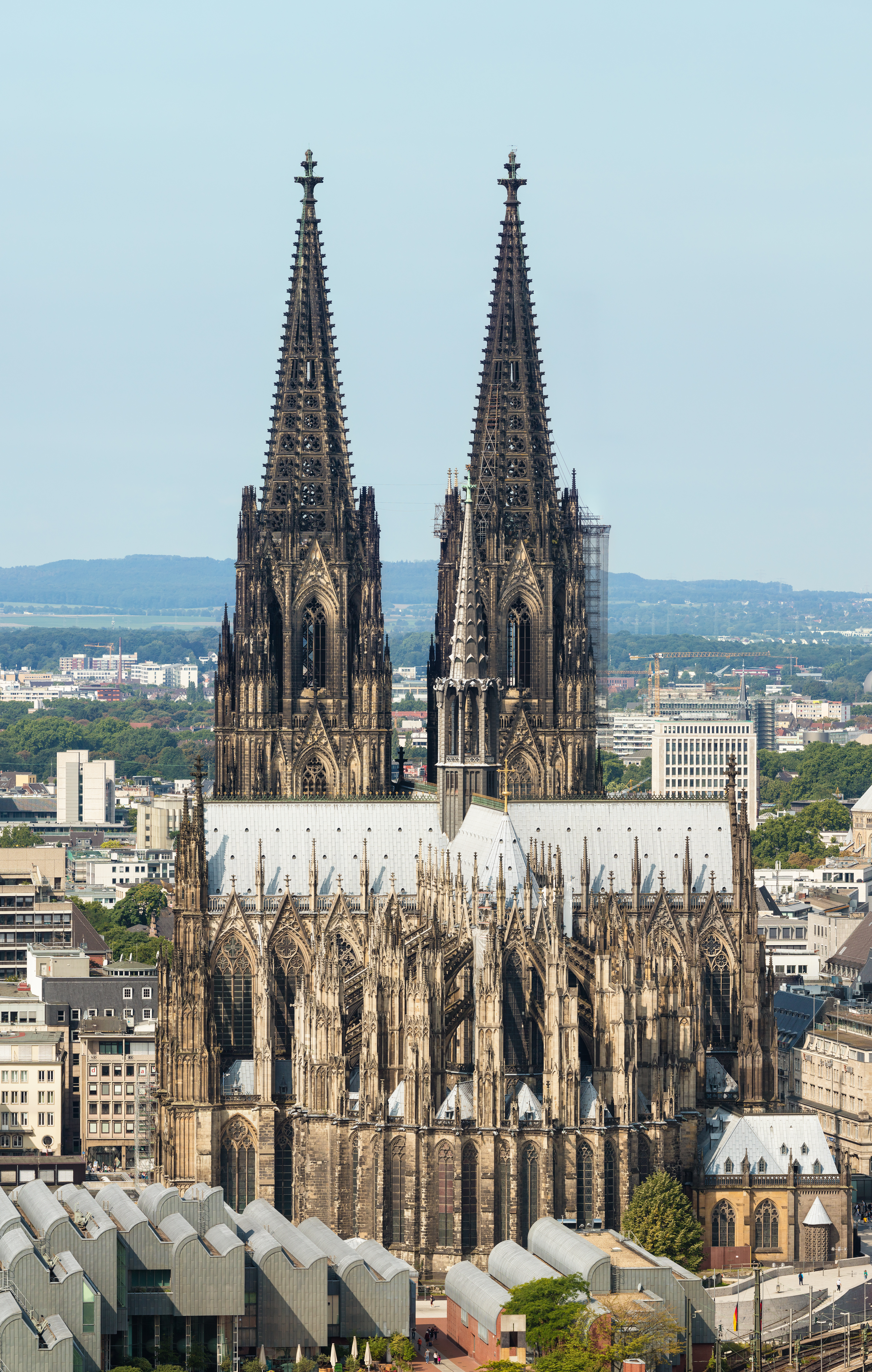
Cologne Cathedral (1248–1560)

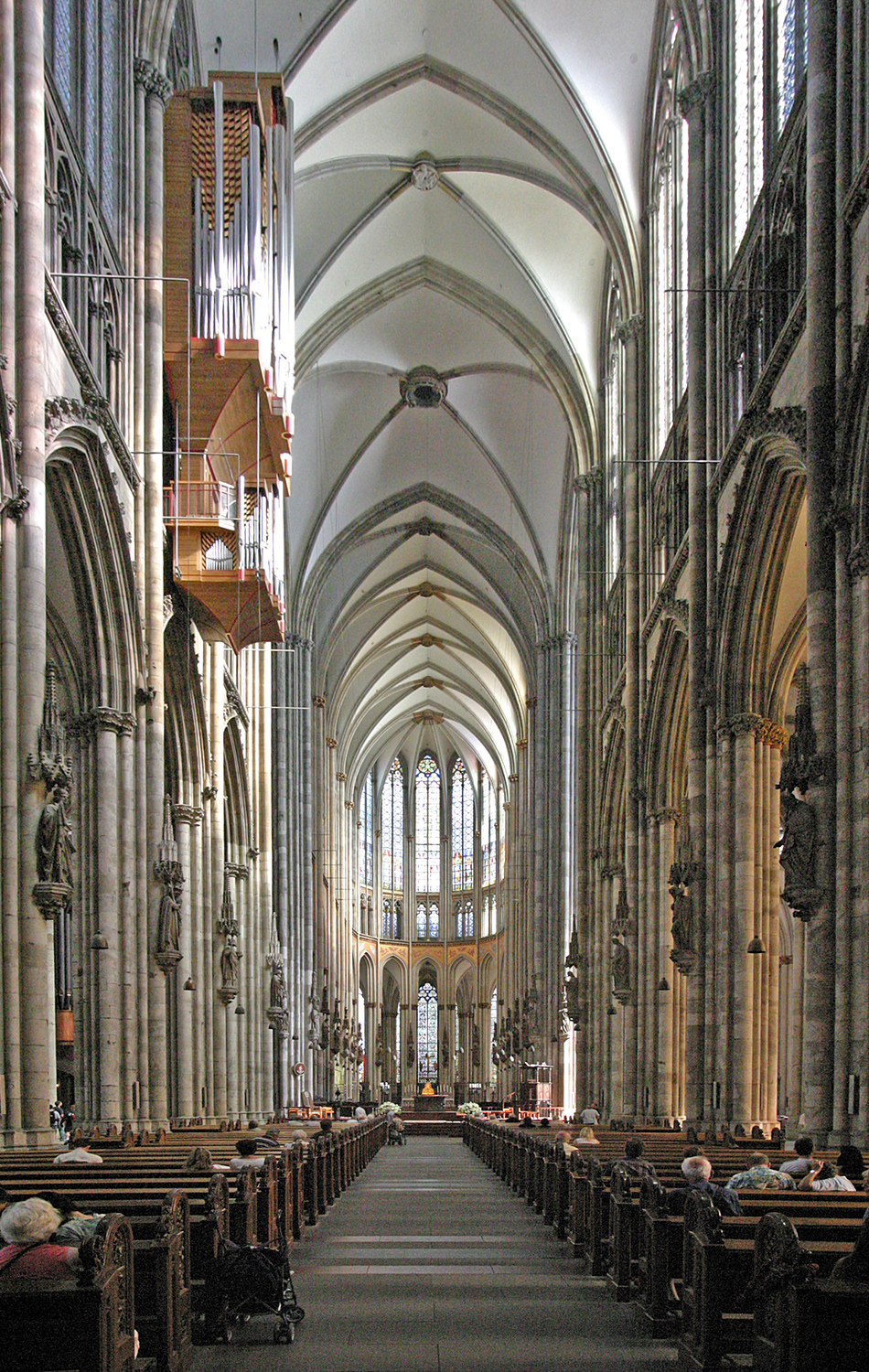
The nave, looking east.

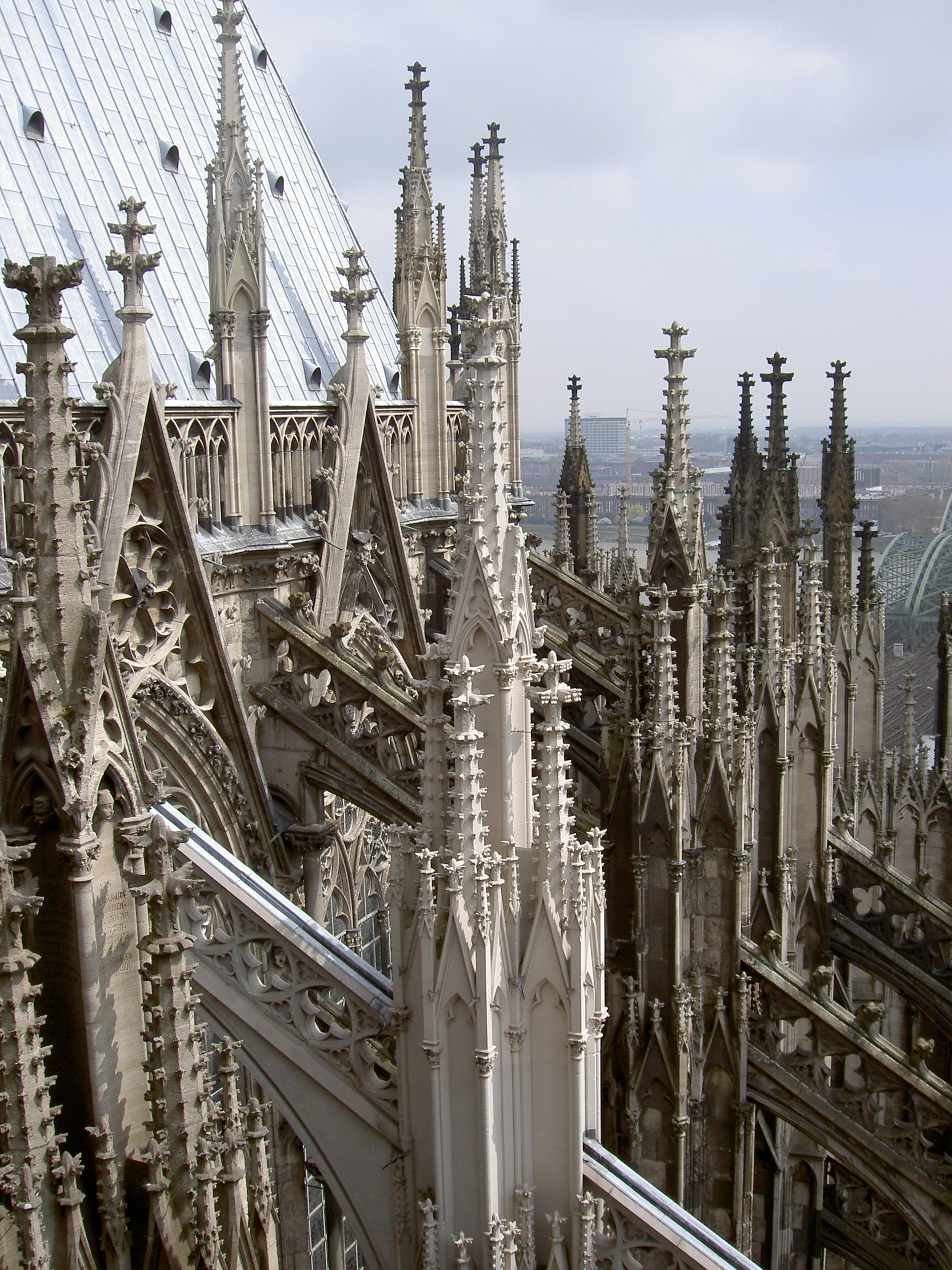
Buttresses and pinnacles on the east end
- Prague Cathedral or St. Vitus Cathedral, was originally begun in the French style 1344 by the French master builder Matthieu d'Arras. After his death in 1353, the King of Bohemia, Charles IV, selected a young Bohemian builder, Petr Parléř, twenty-three years old, to continue the work. The south tower and spire followed the model of the cathedrals of the Rhineland. The great originality was in the interior, where Parléř made imaginative use of more decorative vaults, in fan shapes, with their ribs rising through space, and decorative bosses hanging down the from the ceiling.
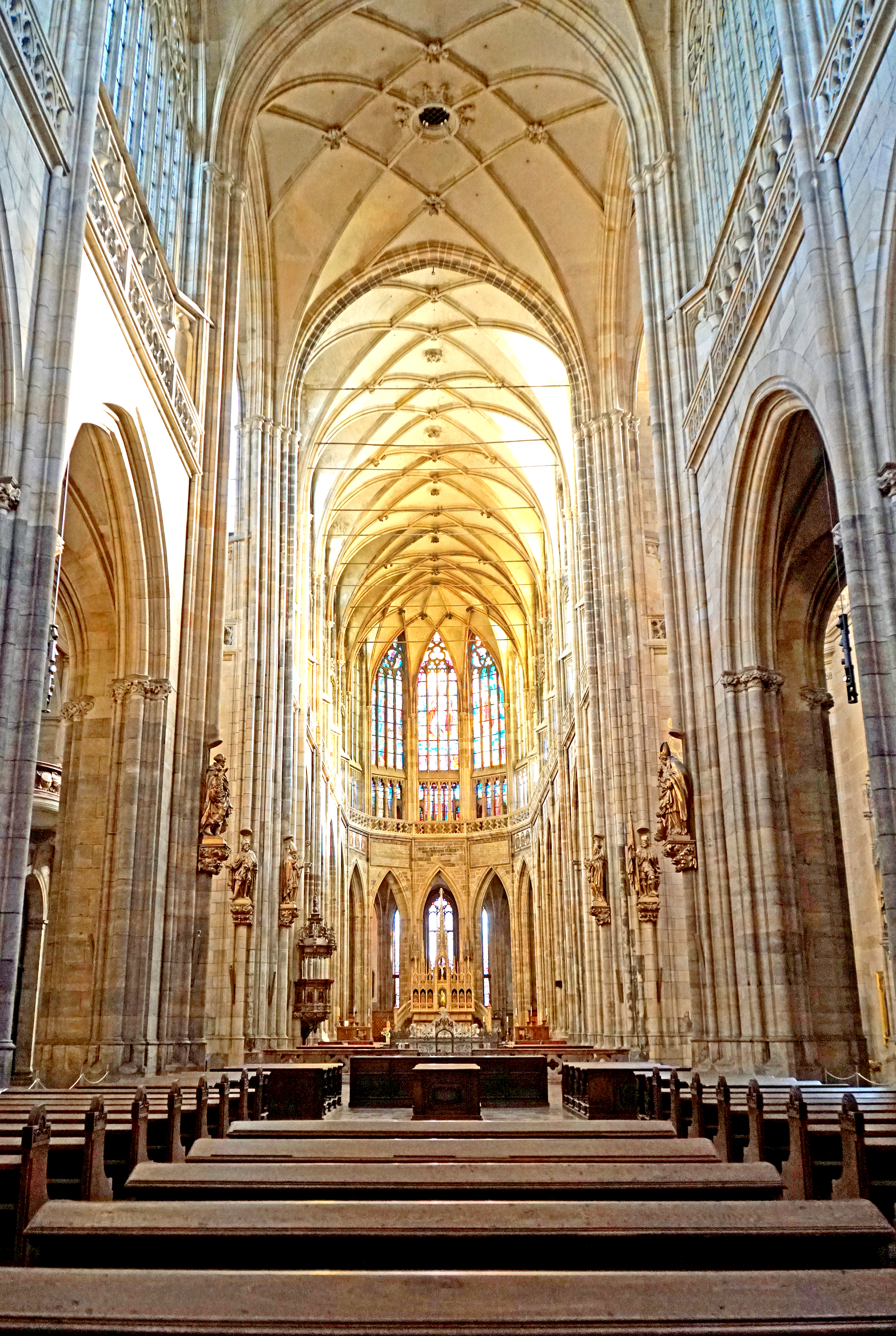
The nave of St. Vitus Cathedral in Prague by Petr Parléř.

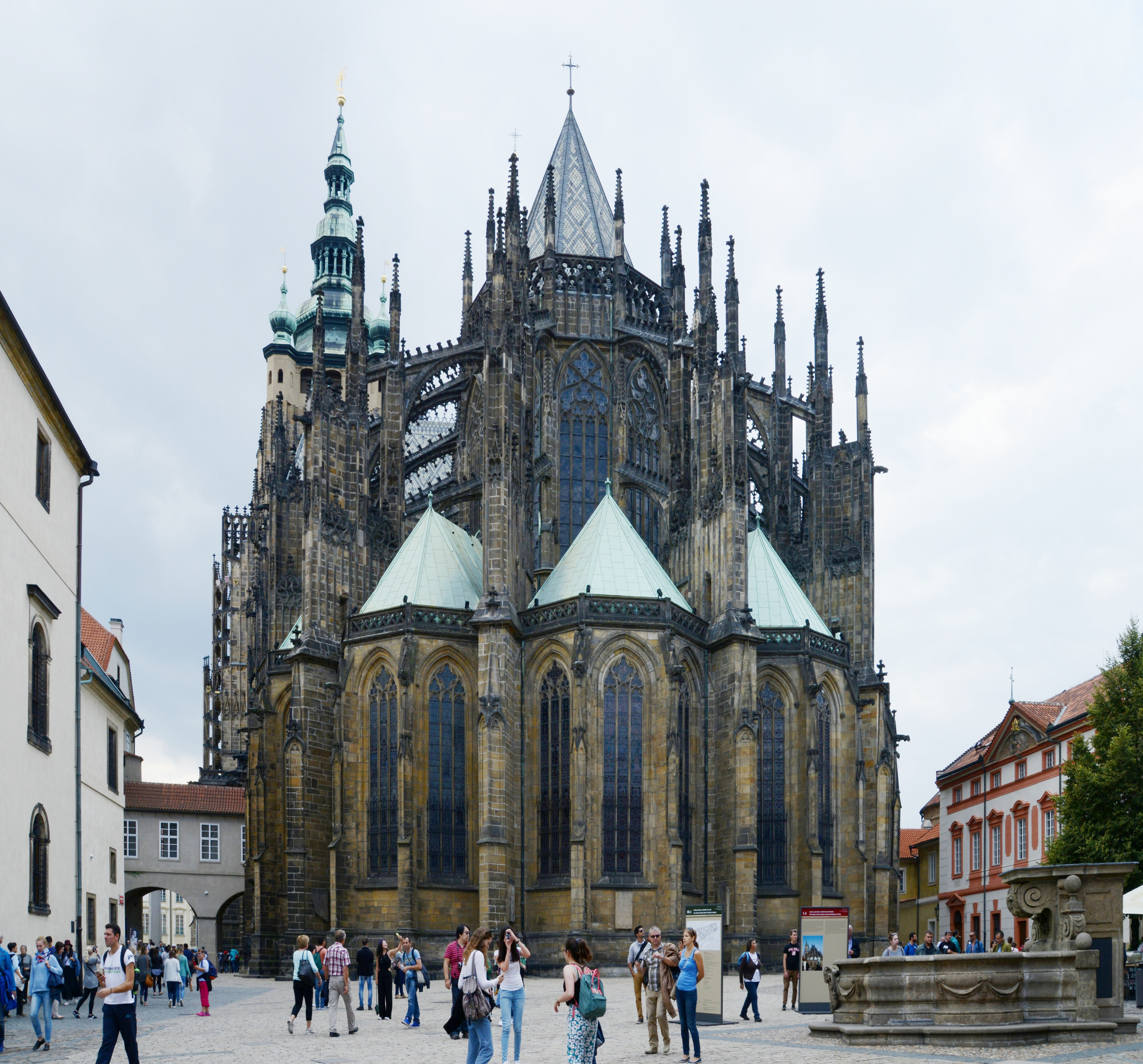
The back of the ambulatory by Matthias of Arras.

The Golden Gate at the South Tower with a mosaic of the Last Judgment.

== Italian High Gothic ==
Italy resisted the Gothic style, using the Romanesque style longer than in Northern Europe, and unlike Northern Europe, it only rarely imitated the French style. Also, building available building materials were different; Italian cathedrals were usually built of brick, not stone, and marble was abundant. Italian architects did adapt some aspects of the northern style, including the rib vault and columns attached to the walls. Early examples were the Pisa Baptistry (1259–60) and the façade of Siena Cathedral (1265–68). Some builders modified some aspects of northern Gothic; Florence Cathedral (1294) used very large arcades to create greater interior space. Notable examples of Italian Rayoannant include the façade of Orvieto Cathedral , the façade of Siena Cathedral and the bell tower of Florence Cathedral . begun by Giotto in 1334. Milan Cathedral was the Italian cathedral most influenced by Northern Europe. However, its distinctive flamboyant exterior, begun in 1386, was not completed until 1805 for the coronation of Napoleon Bonaparte as King of Italy.

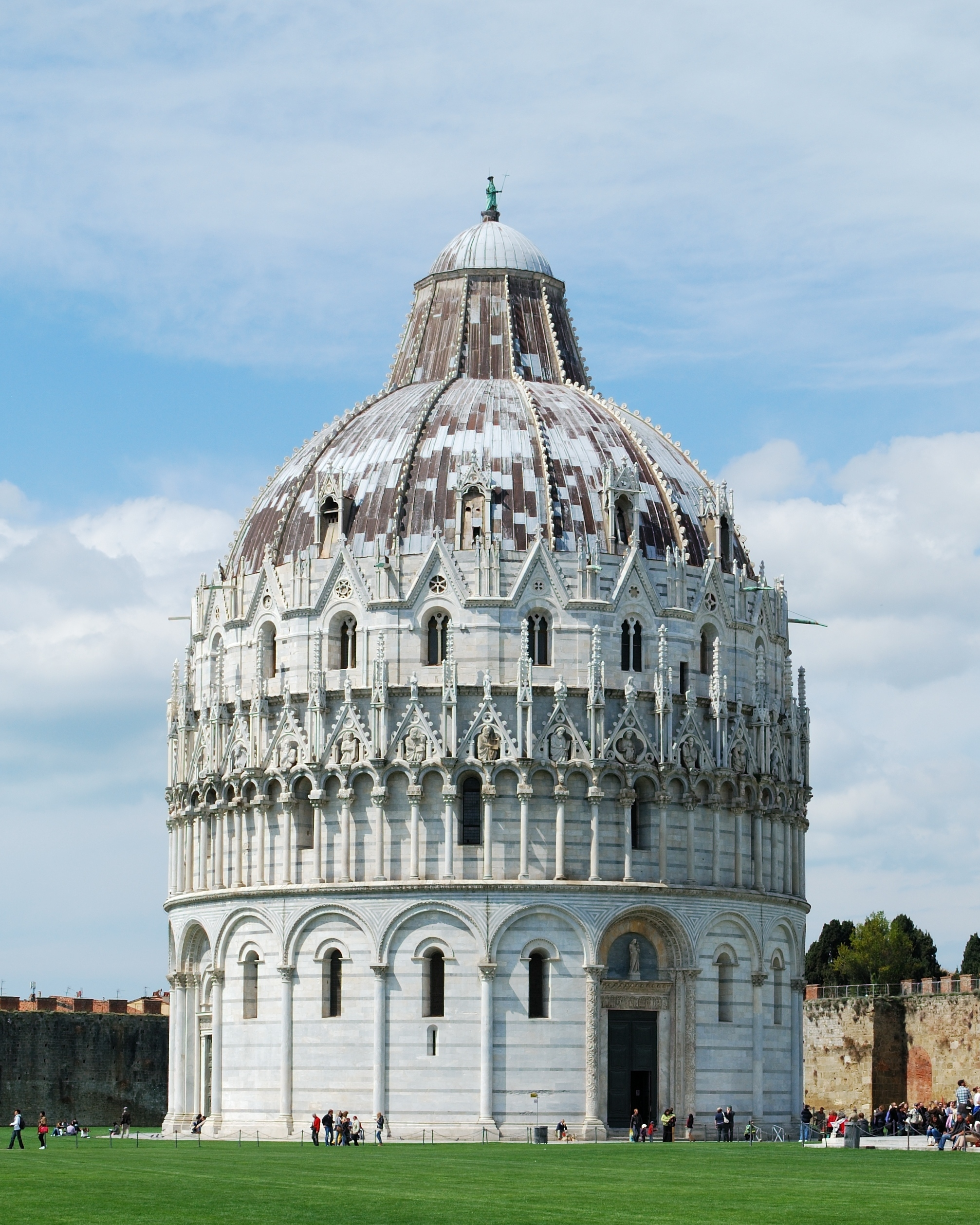
Pisa Baptistry (1259–60)

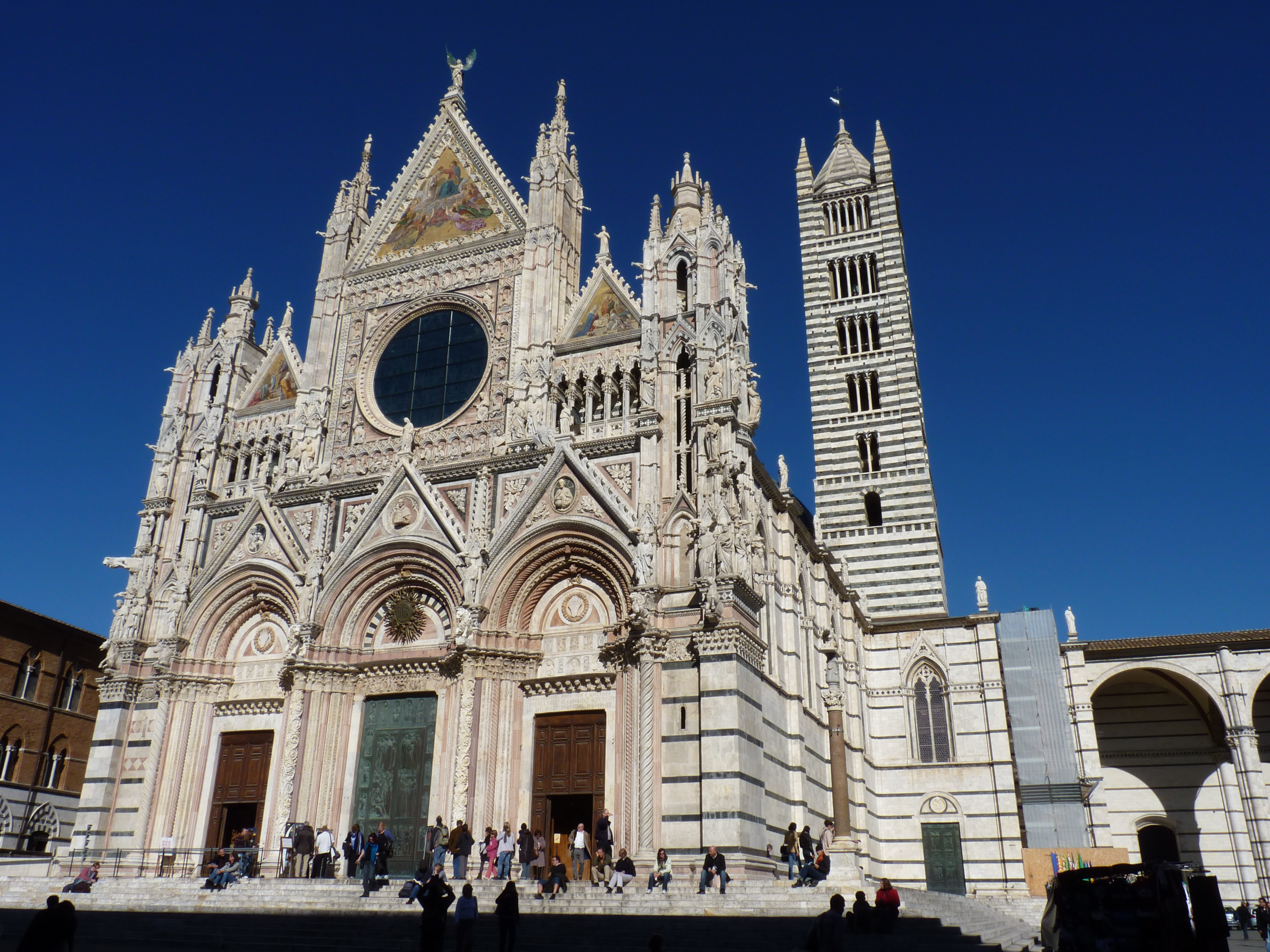
Façade of Siena Cathedral (1265–68)

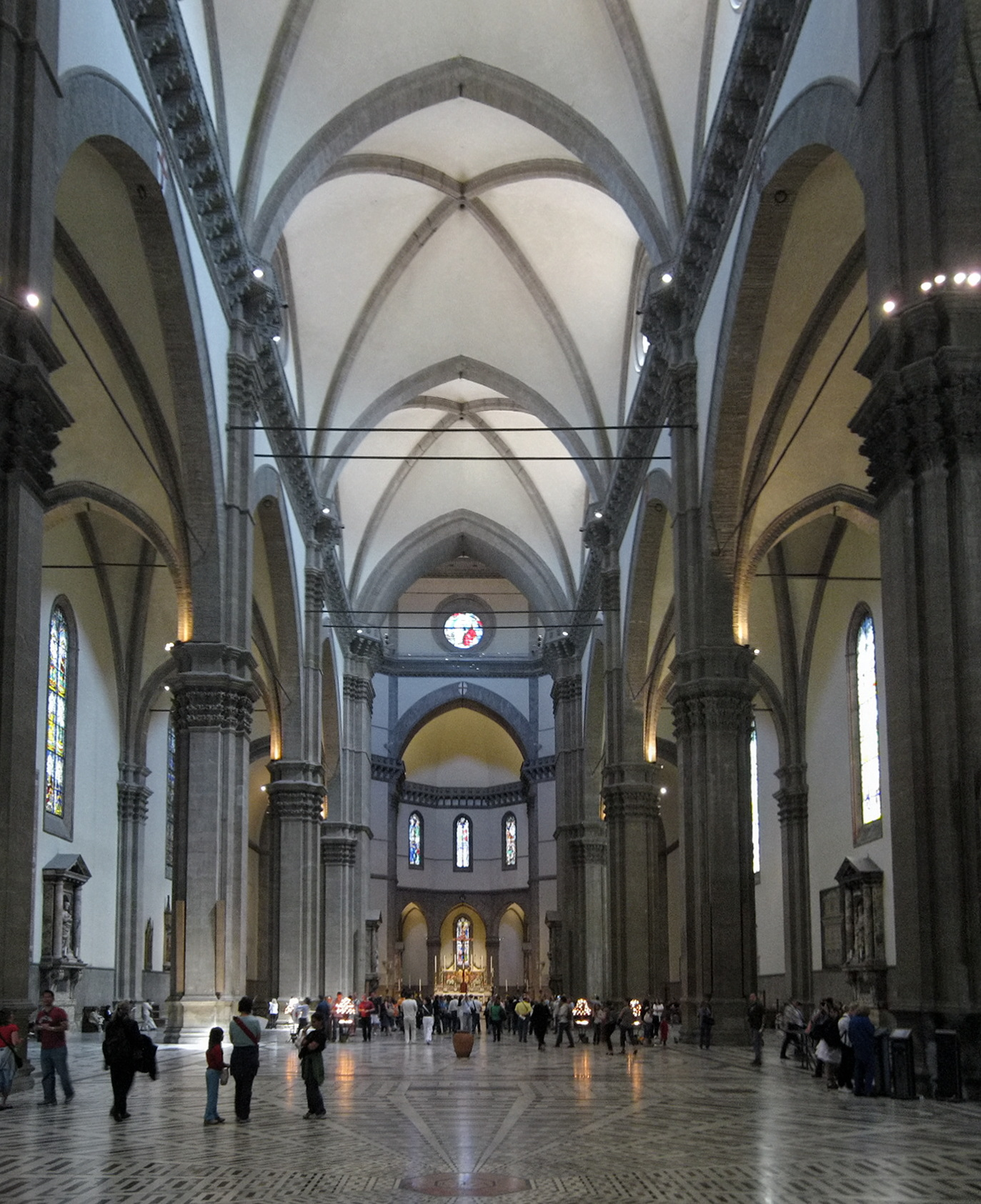
Nave of Florence Cathedral, with its wide and deep galleries (1294)

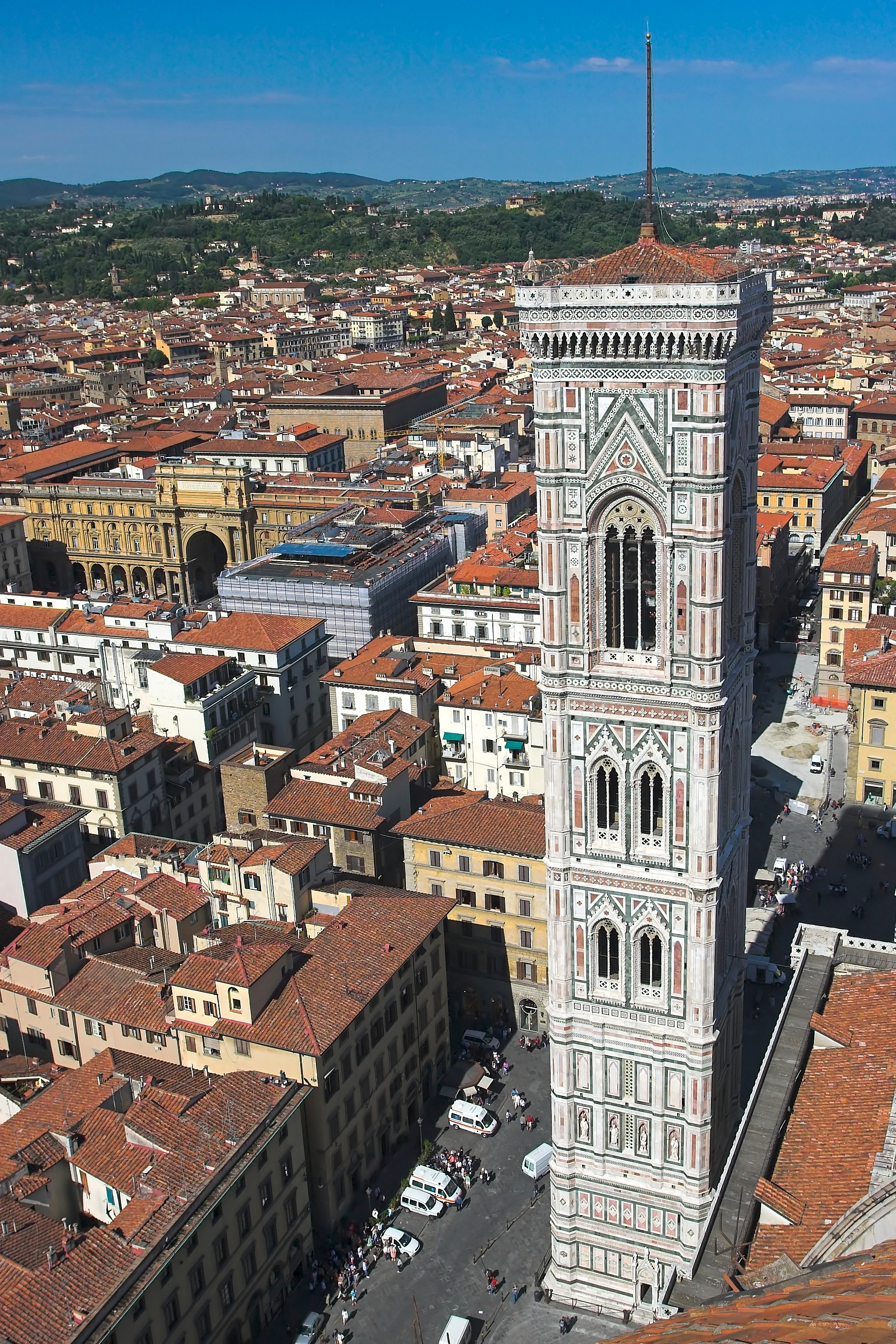
Campanile, or bell tower of Florence Cathedral, by Giotto (begun 1334)

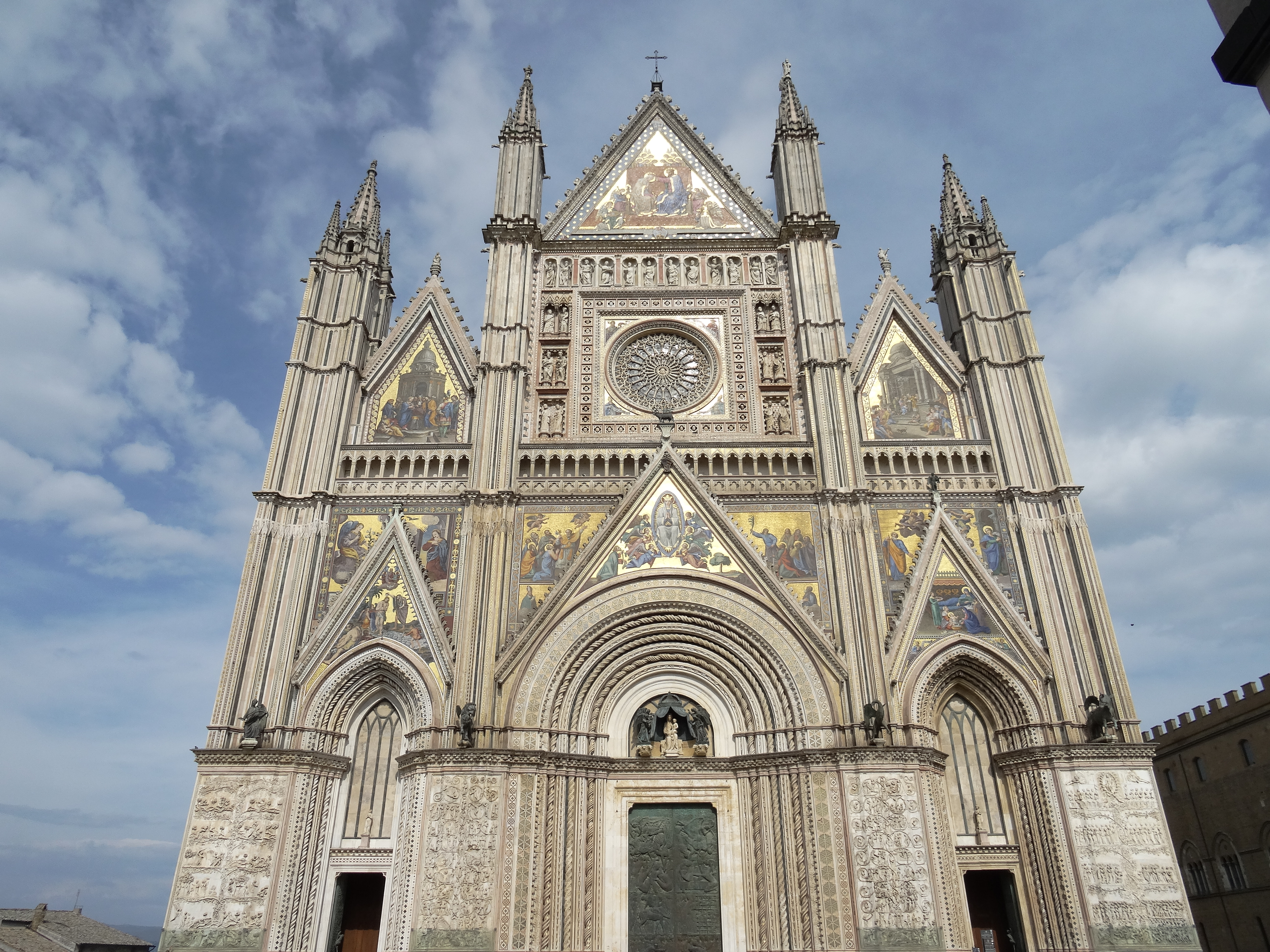
Façade of Orvieto Cathedral (1290–1591)

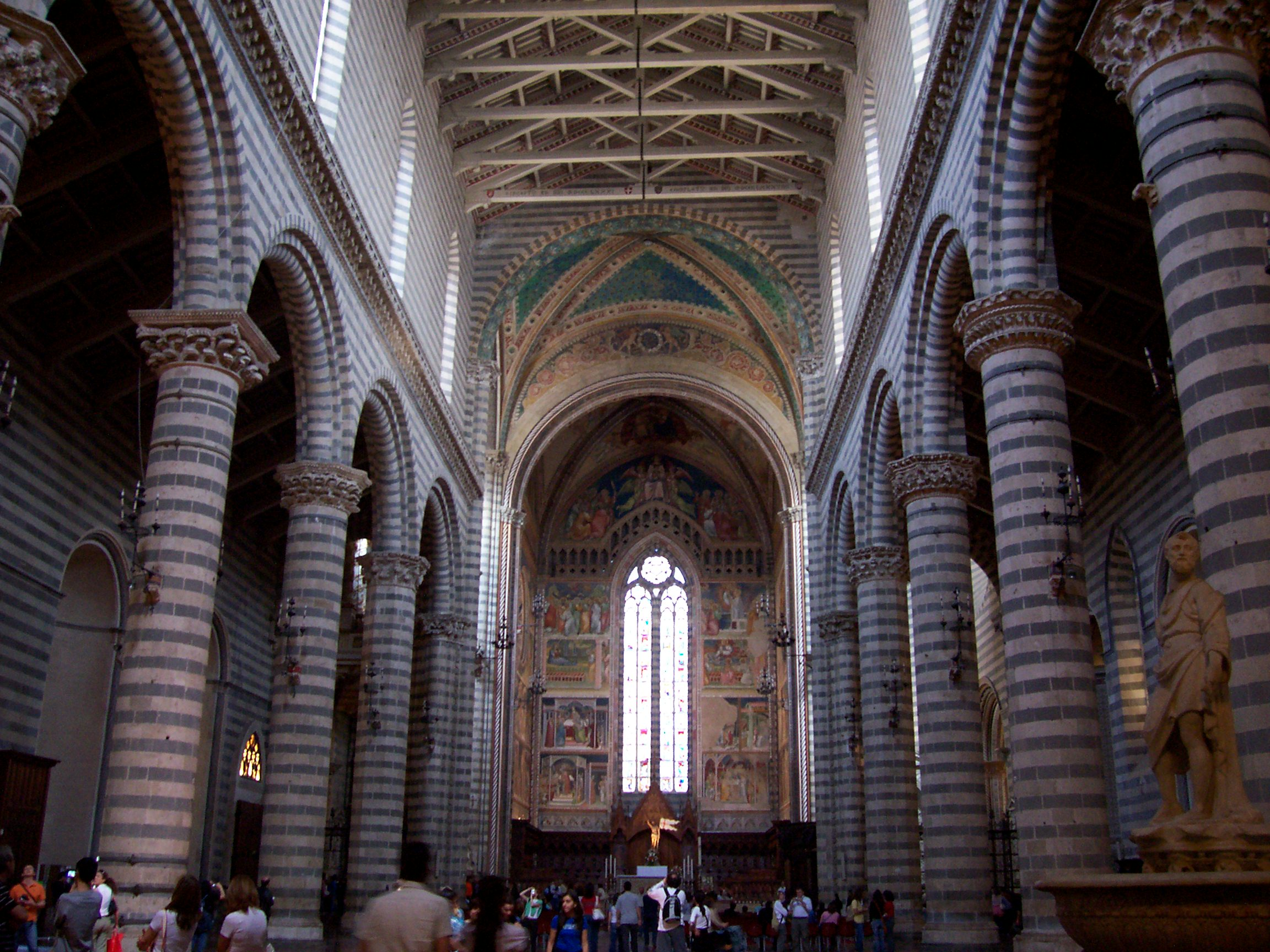
Interior of Orvieto Cathedral, with its wide galleries

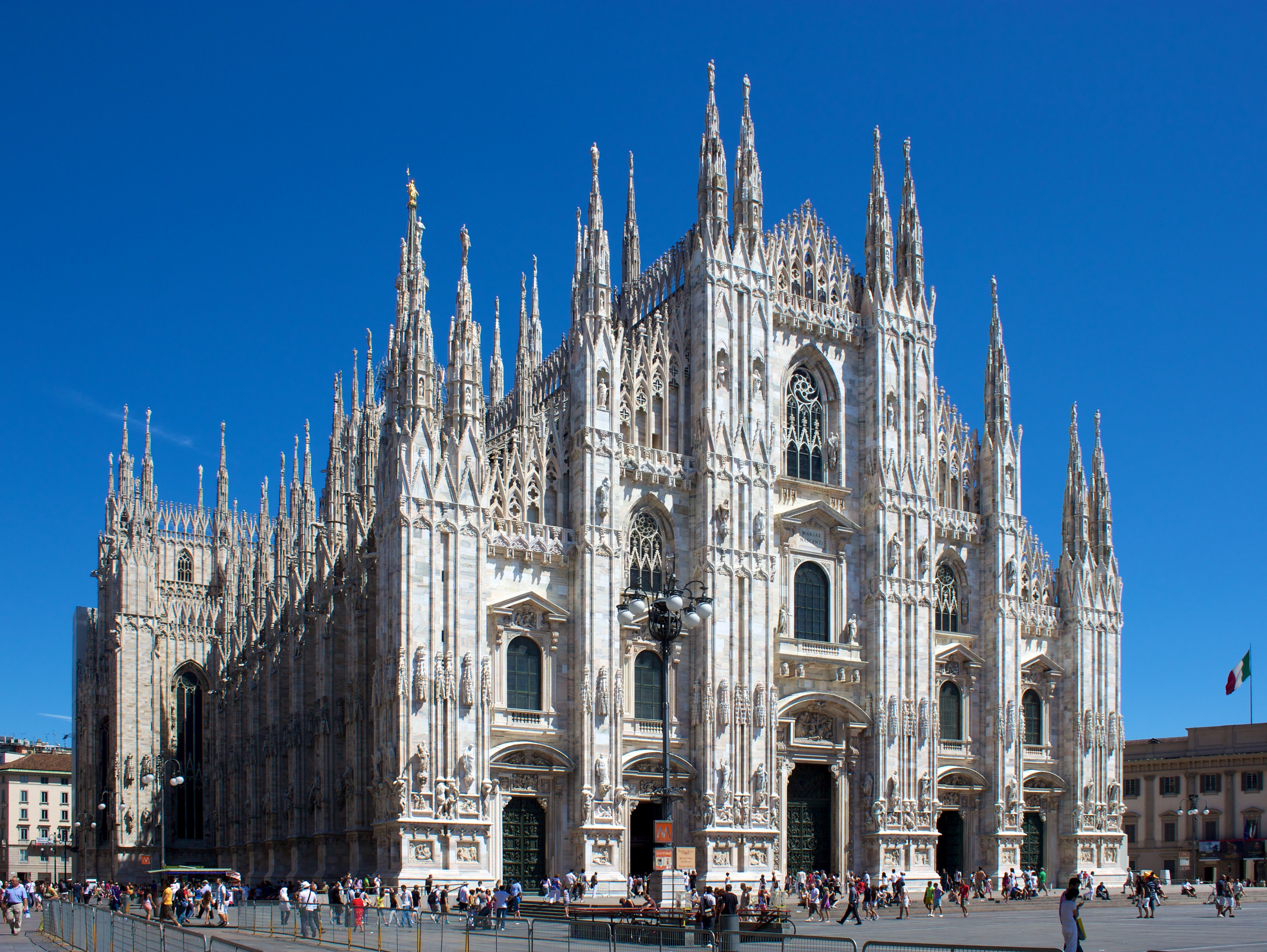
Milan Cathedral (1386–1805)

== Flamboyant Gothic – France and Spain ==
The last phase of Gothic was called Flamboyant, named for its characteristic flame-like motifs. It appeared particularly in the 15th and early 16th century in France and Spain.

- Rouen Cathedral The west front of Rouen Cathedral has dense flamboyant decoration, as well as flamboyant decoration on portions of the right tower (15th century) and the central lantern tower (13th–16th century).
- Church of Saint-Maclou in Rouen (1500–1514). This church, not far from Rouen Cathedral, is considered one of the finest examples of the Flamboyant style in France.
- The Tour Saint-Jacques, near the Louvre in central Paris, is a monument of the Flamboyant style. It is all that remains of the former church of Saint-Jacques, located at the center of Les Halles, the old central produce market, built by the wealthy guild of butchers.
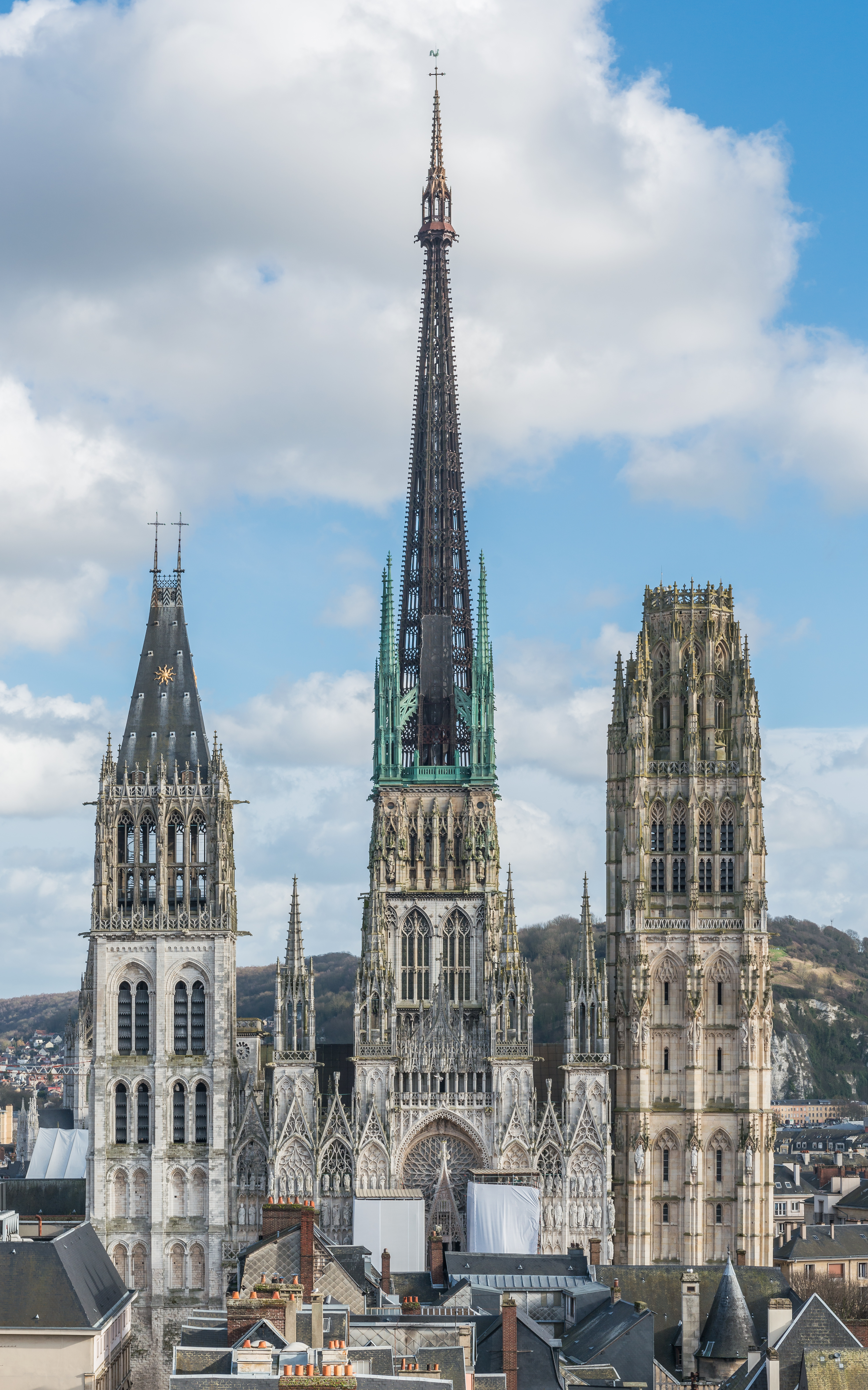
Rouen Cathedral has a Flamboyant central tower (13th–16th century) and right tower (15th century)

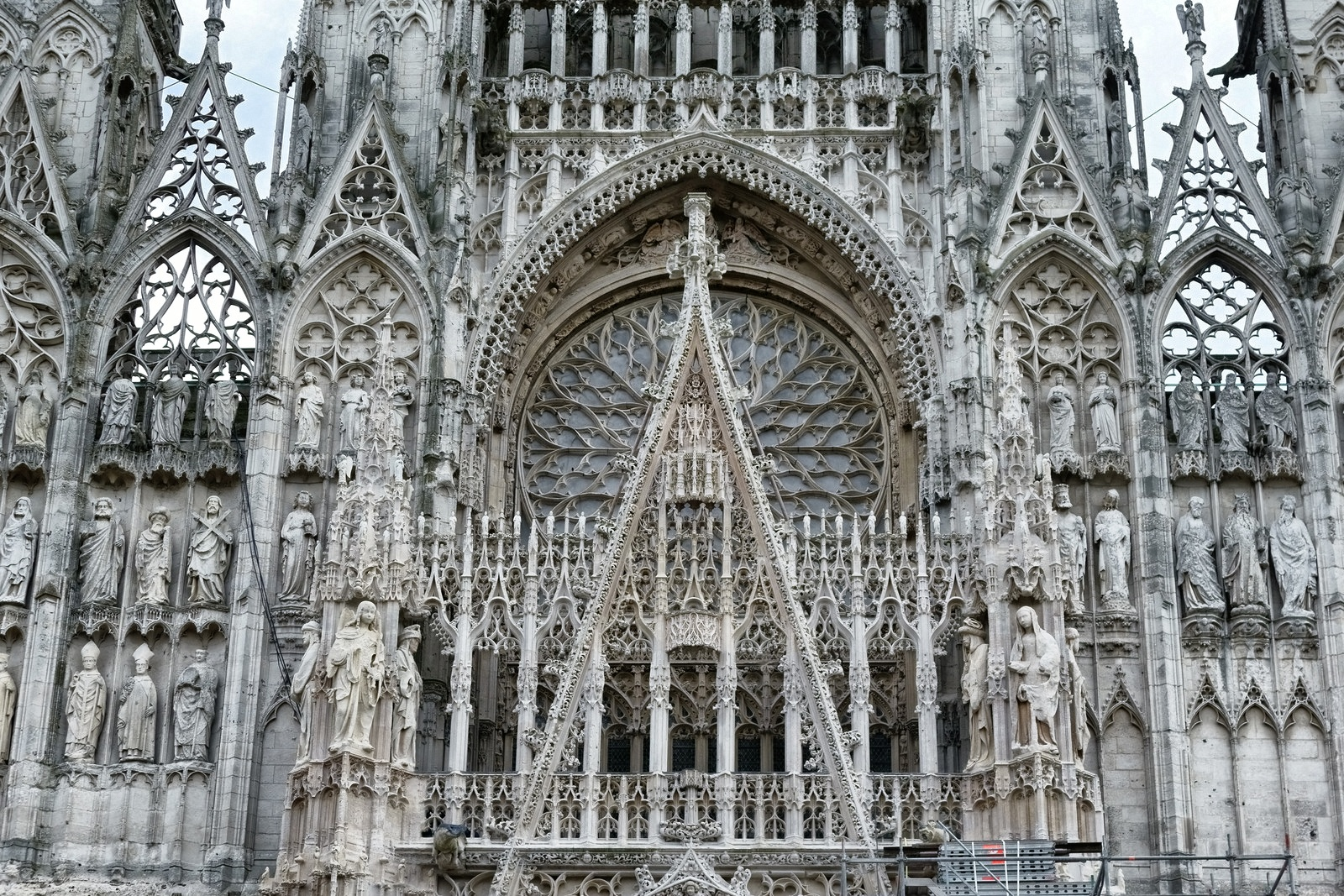
Detail of west façade of Rouen Cathedral (13th–16th century)

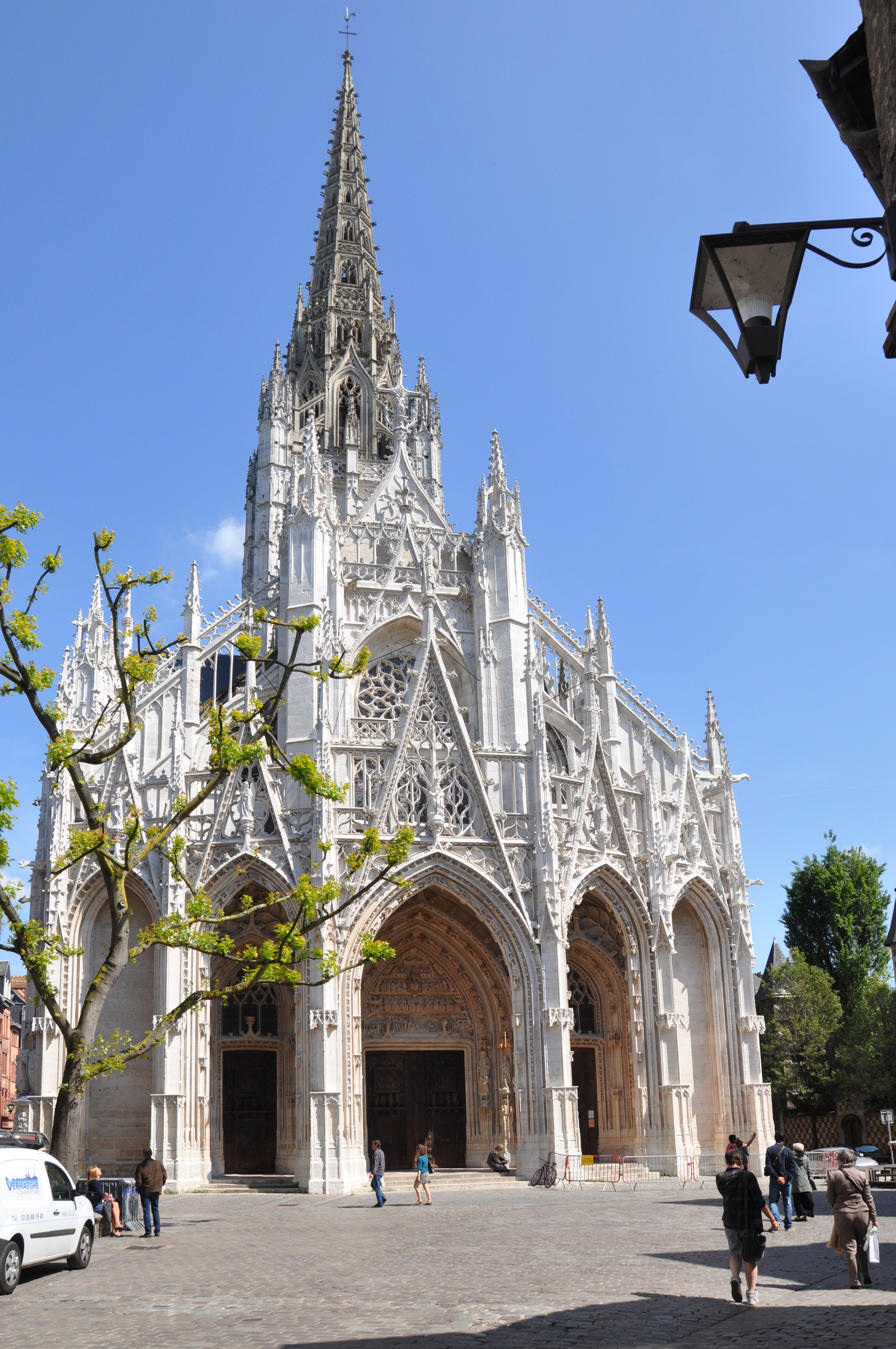
Church of Saint-Maclou, Rouen (1500–1514)

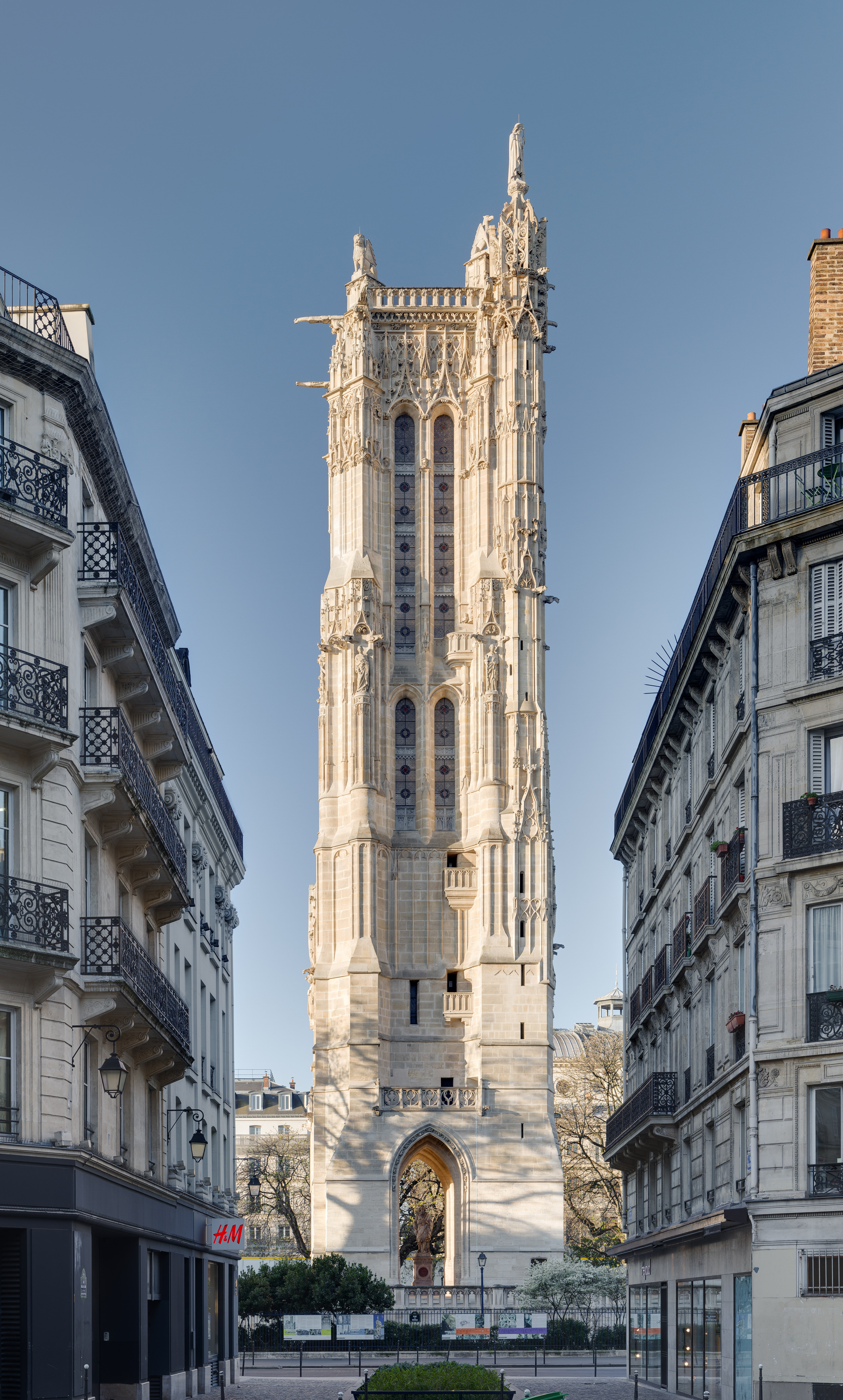
Tour Saint-Jacques, Paris (16th century)
- Burgos Cathedral. Burgos Cathedral was first constructed between 1221 and 1257 in the French Rayonnant style, with its typical three-story elevation, vaulting and tracery, and an abundance of rich sculpture, particularly around the portals. Beginning in the mid-15th century, it was largely rebuilt and redecorated in the Flamboyant stye, with a new choir a cupola with star vaulting, a lantern tower, and new portals, grills and choir stalls. The new work was not completed until 1567. The Burgos workshop continued to train Spanish sculptors and artisans. The design of golden stairway in the north transept by Diego de Siloe (1519) reappeared in larger form in the 18th century Grand Théâtre de Bordeaux; then in the 19th century on an even grander scale, in the grand stairway of the Palais Garnier in Paris by Charles Garnier.
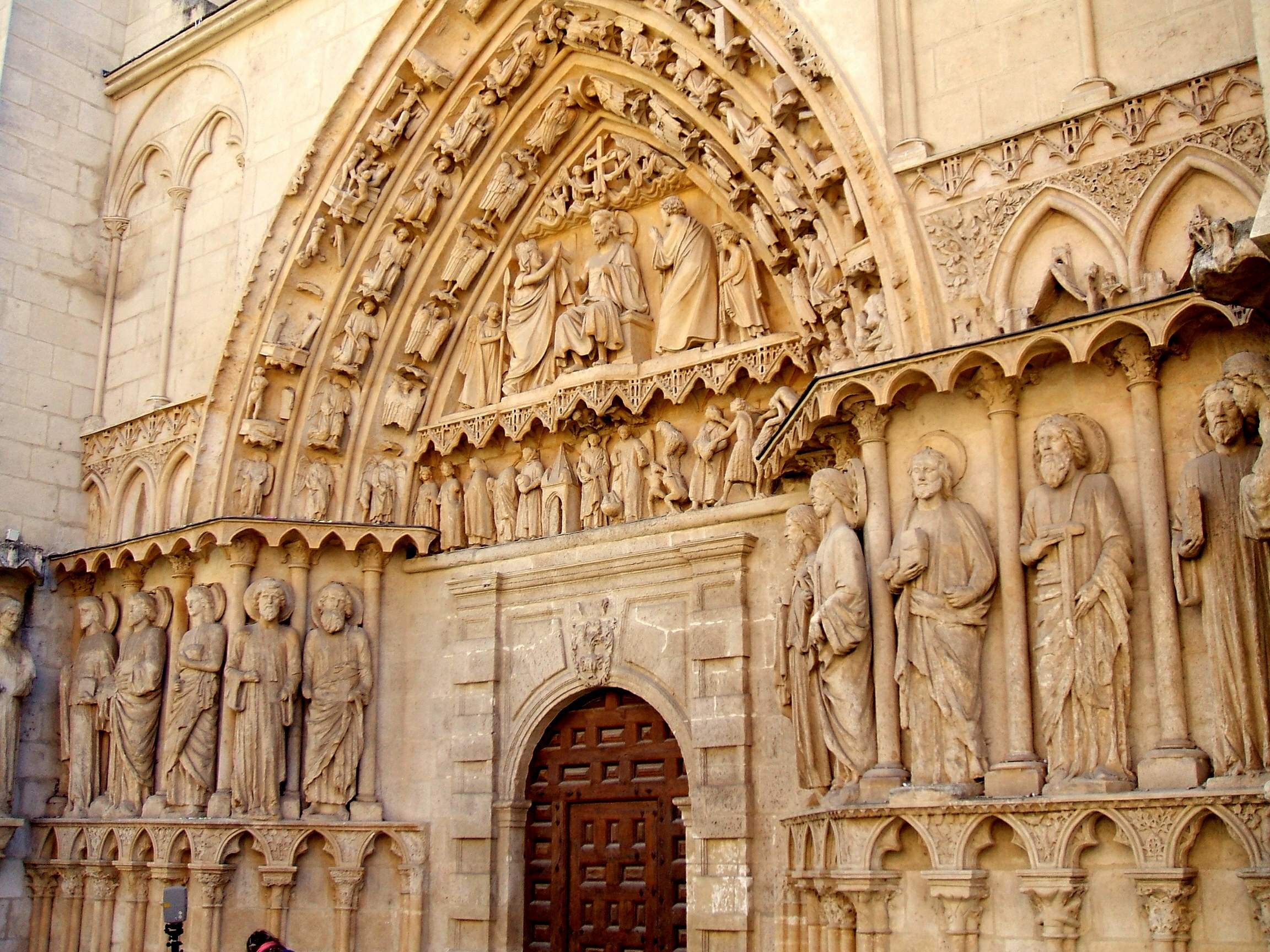
Door of the apostles, Burgos Cathedral (13th century)

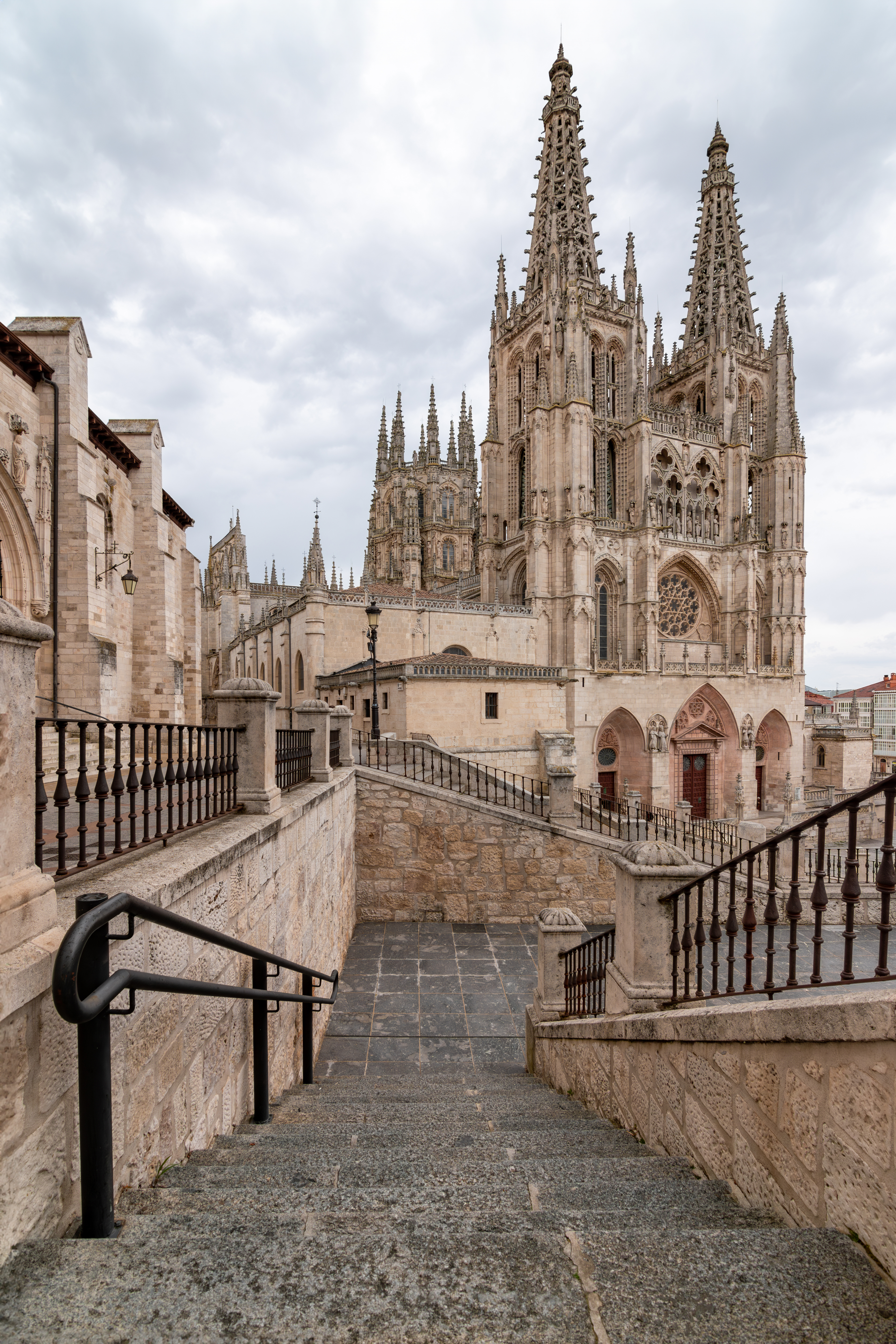
Flamboyant Gothic towers and façade of Burgos Cathedral (13th–16th century)

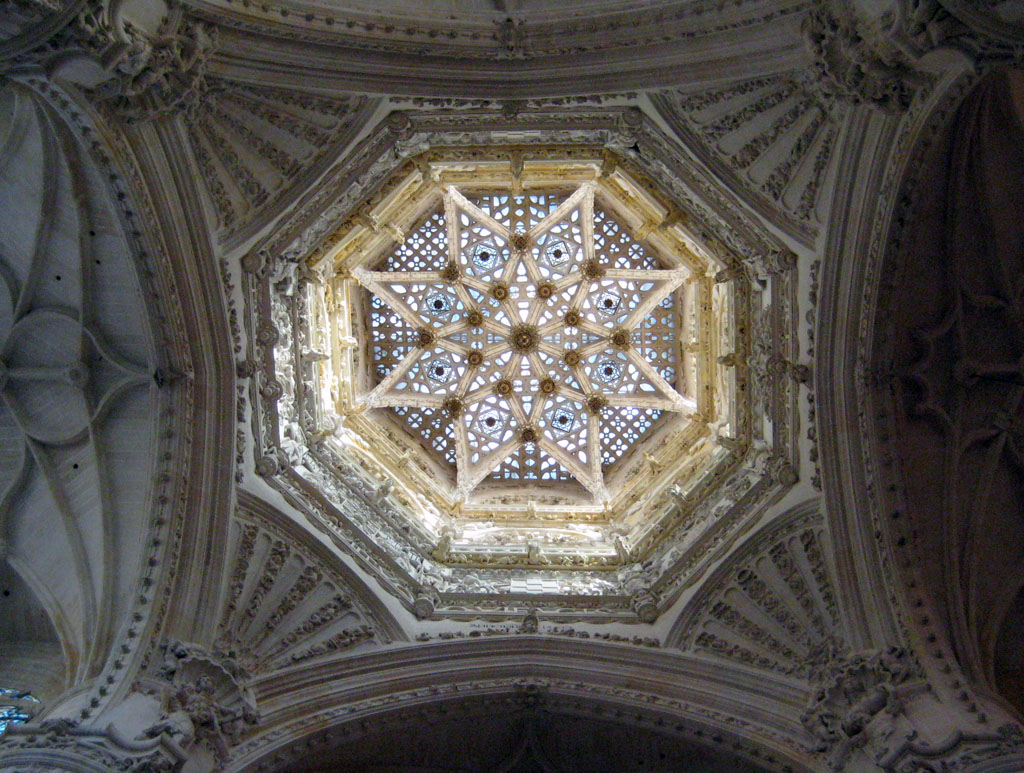
Star vault of the Cupola of Burgos Cathedral (15th–16th century)

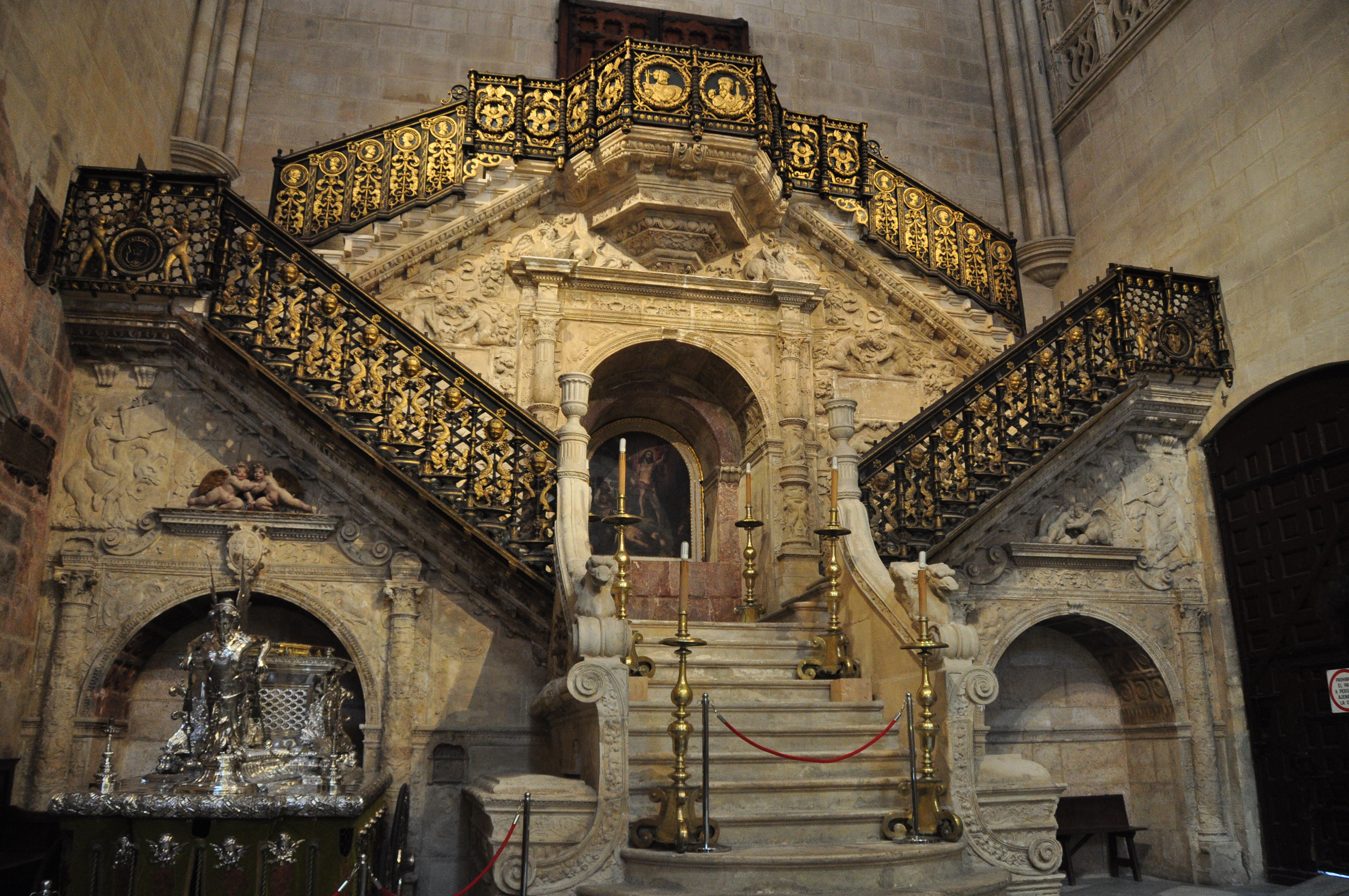
The Golden Stairway of the north transept of Burgos Cathedral (1519)
- Segovia Cathedral (1525–1577) is a notable example of the late Spanish Gothic, with elaborate decorative vaults and lavish ornament. The dome was a 17th-century addition. The domes replaced tall wooden spires made of American mahogany.
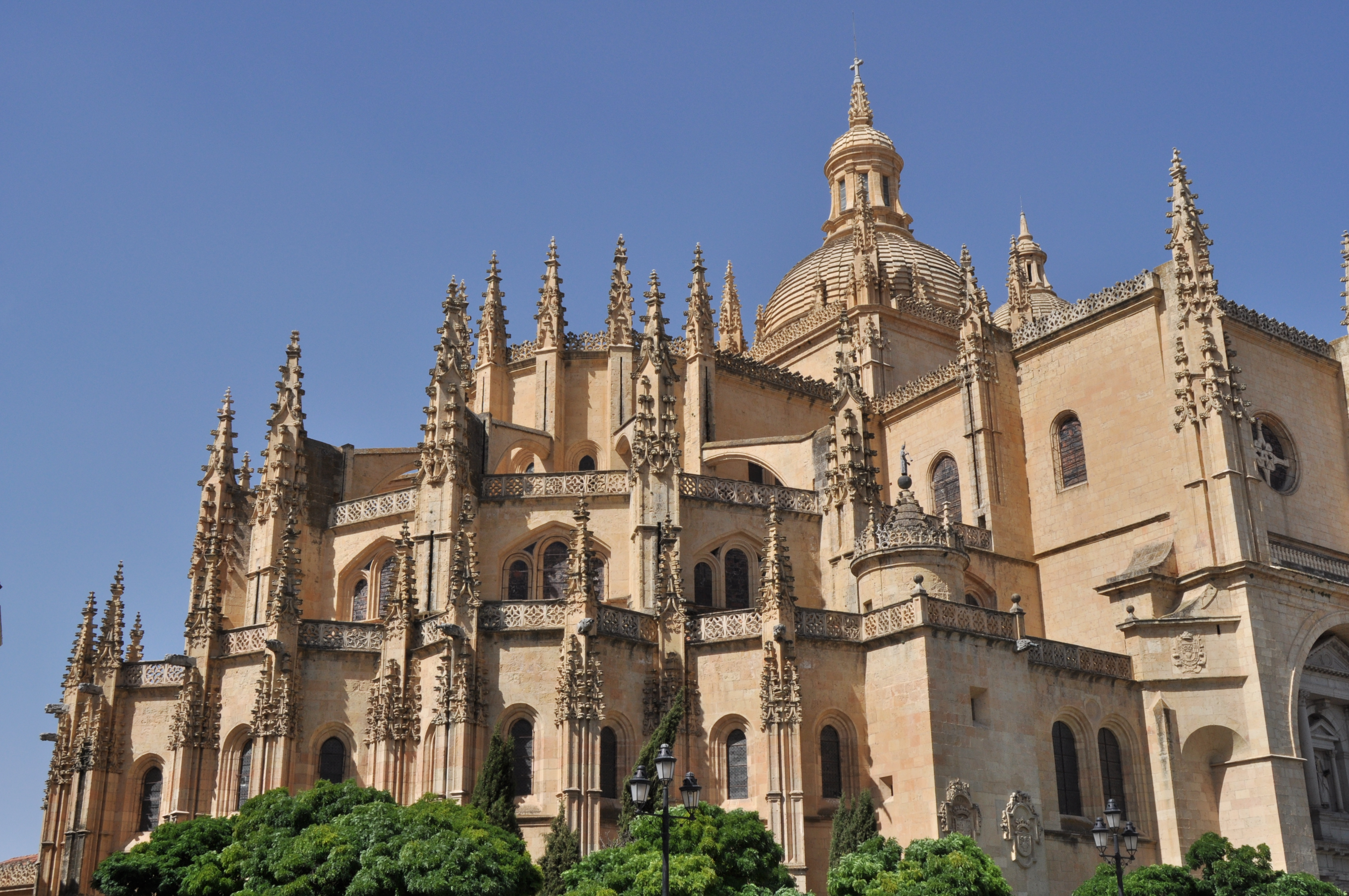
Segovia Cathedral (1525-1577). The domes are a 17th-century addition, replacing wooden spires.

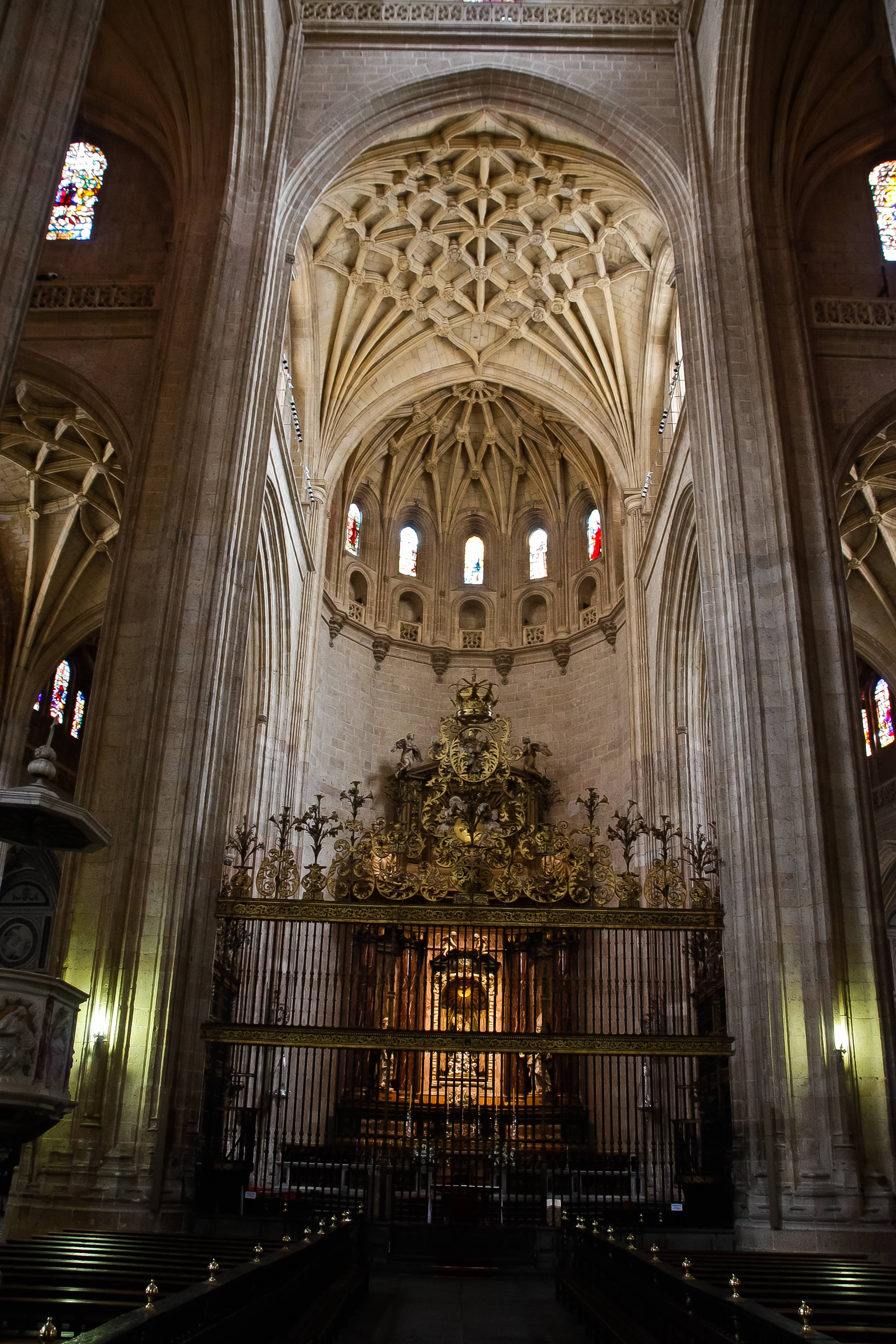
Interior of Segovia Cathedral

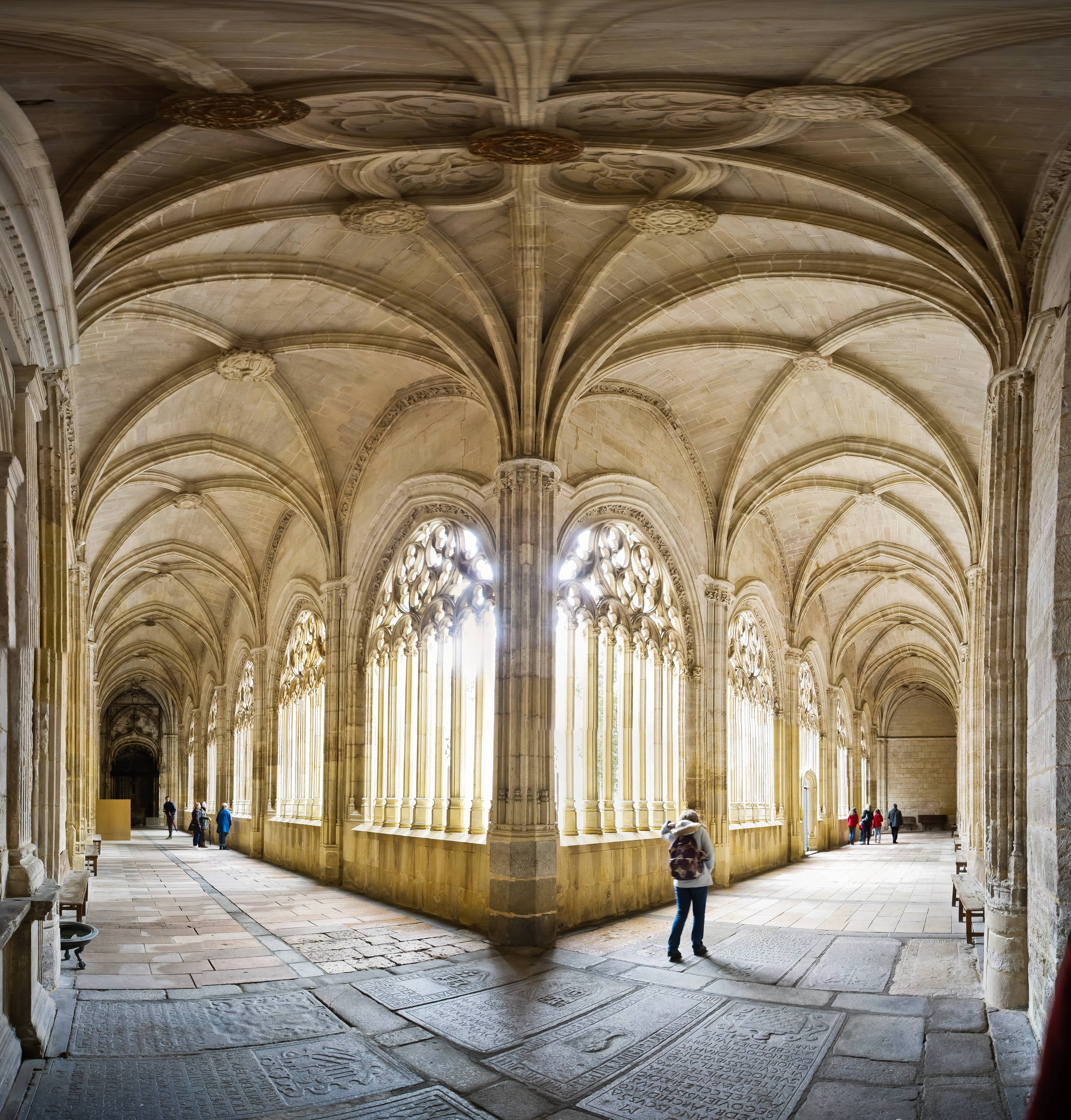
Cloisters of Segovia Cathedral

== Perpendicular Gothic – England (Late 13th–16th century) ==
The Perpendicular Gothic in England, in the late 13th–16th centuries, roughly coincided with the Flamboyant style in France. It aimed for rich visual effects through decoration, and gave predominance to vertical lines, especially in the window tracery. Windows occupied the major part of the wall space. The architects also experimented with various kinds of decorative vaults, such as the fan vault, where most of the thin ribs, springing upward from slender columns, were purely decorative. Major examples of the style include Gloucester Cathedral, King's College Chapel at Cambridge University, and the chapel of Henry IV in Westminster Abbey.

- Gloucester Cathedral (1089–1499) contains elements from every period of Gothic architecture, as well as even earlier vestiges of Norman Architecture. The crypt is Norman, the nave early English Gothic, and the south transept is Decorated Gothic. The south porch uses the Perpendicular style fan vault, while the cloisters north of the nave have has what are said to be the oldest surviving fan vaults in England, dating to 1351–1379. The cloister also has the distinction of having been a set for three of the Harry Potter films.
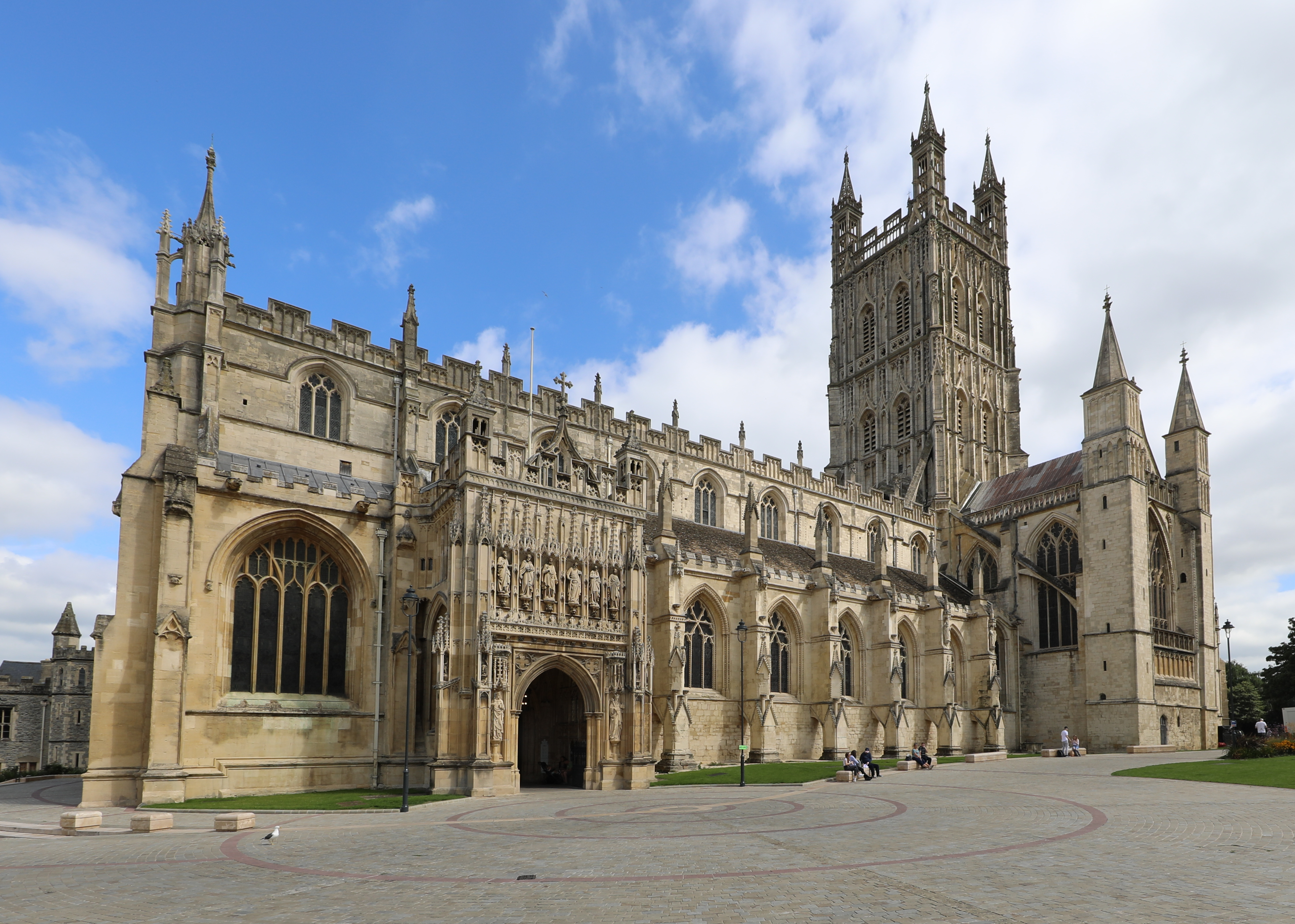
Gloucester Cathedral (1089–1499)

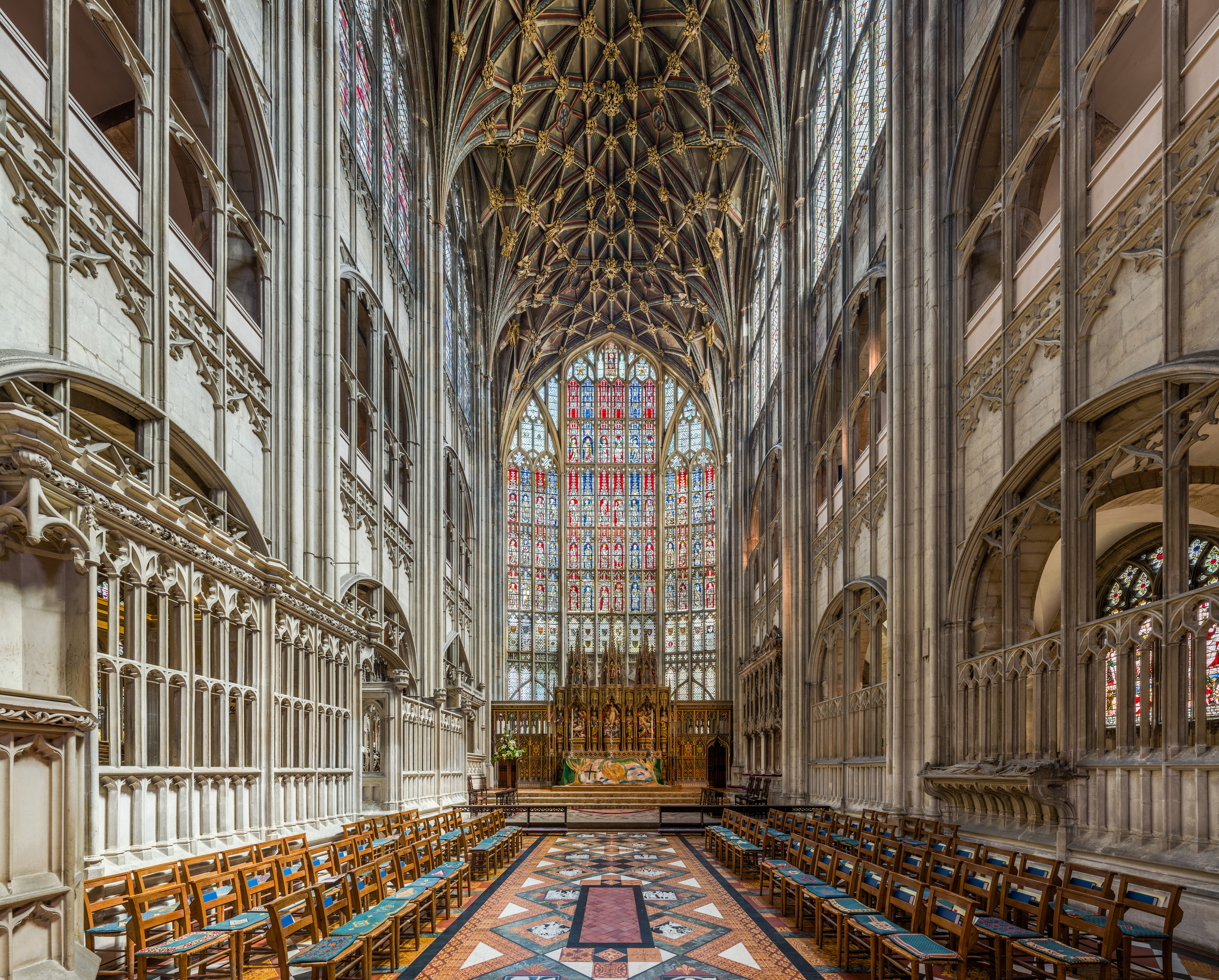
Gloucester Cathedral choir and high altar (1089–1499)

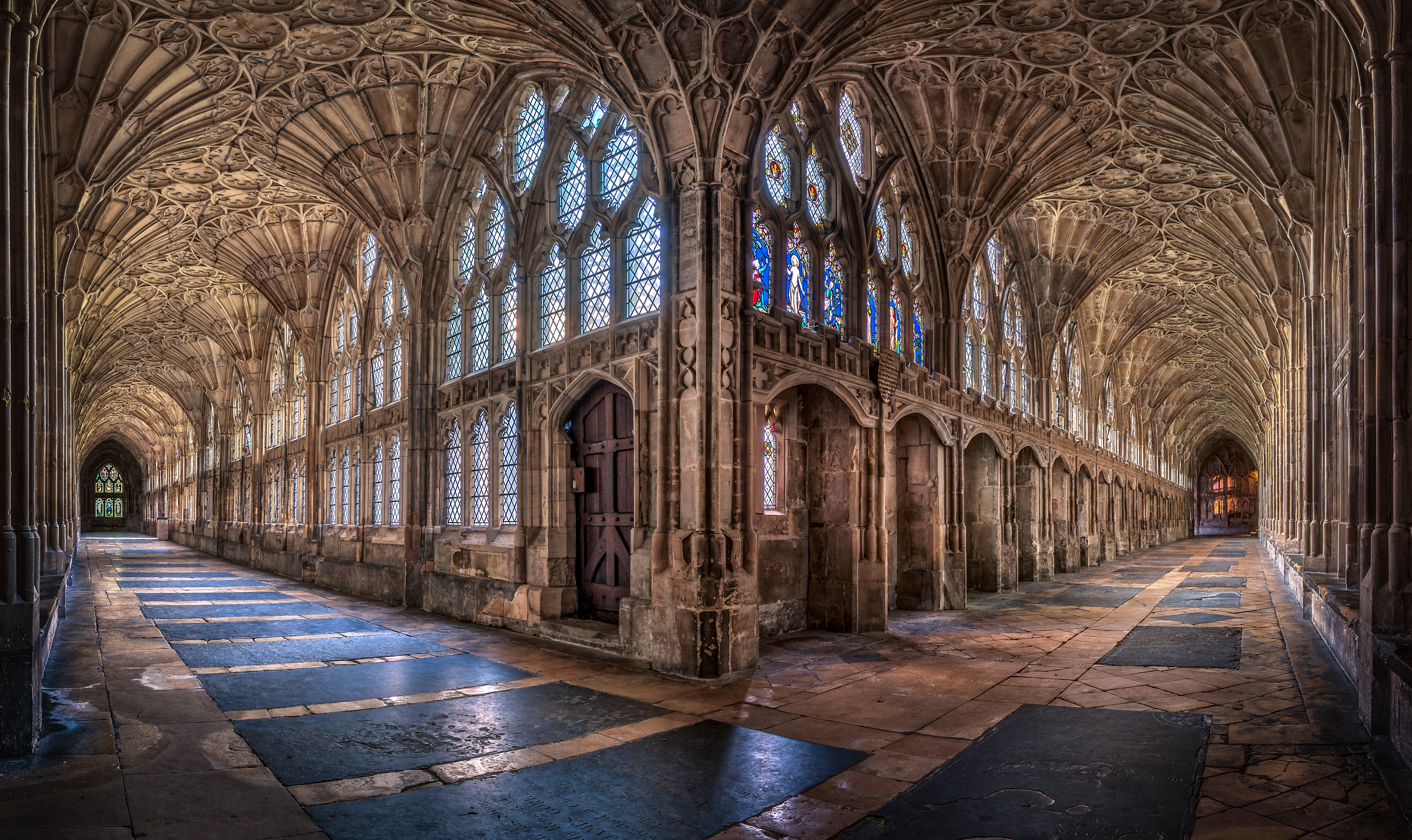
The Cloisters of Gloucester Cathedral, with the oldest surviving English fan vaults.
- Kings College Chapel at Cambridge University was built between 1446 and 1515, is a notable example of English Perpendicular Gothic architecture. It was constructed by Henry VI of England. The windows were added in 1531, and ornate rood screen, a Renaissance feature, was added in 1532–36. The immense decorative fan vaults are a distinctive perpendicular feature. In characteristic perpendicular style, the windows almost completely fill the walls.
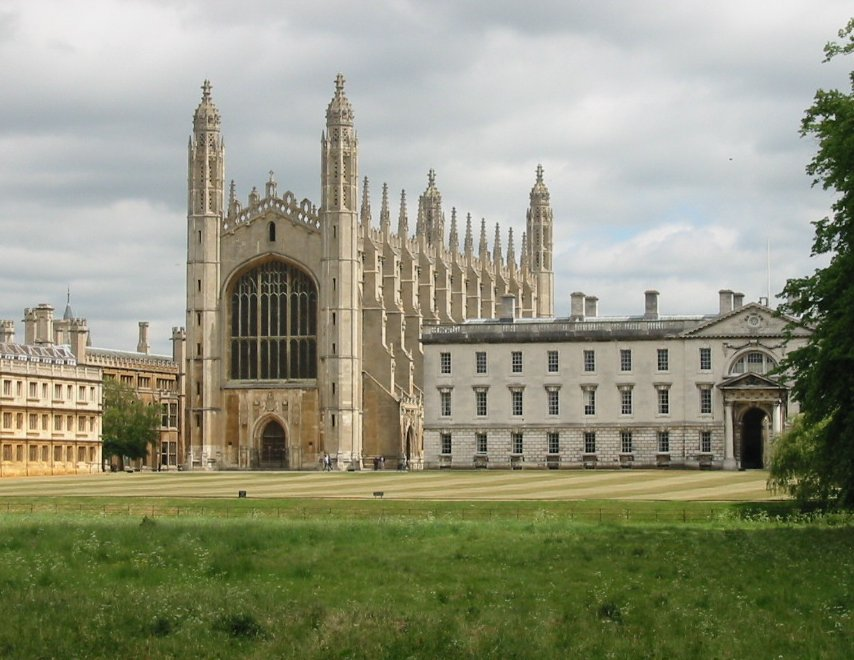
King's College Chapel at Cambridge University

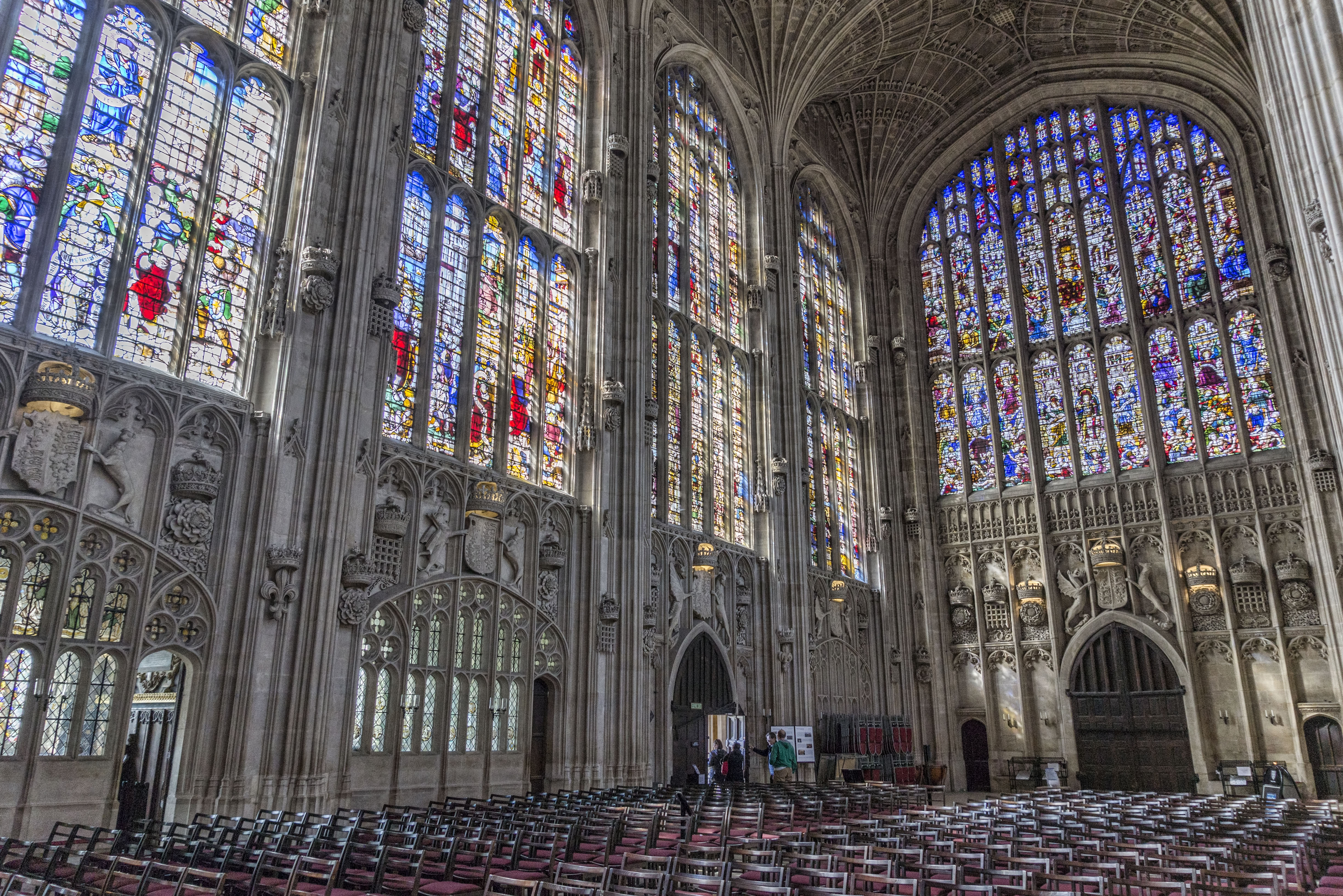
Windows of King's College Chapel, Cambridge (1446–1451) fill almost all the wall space.

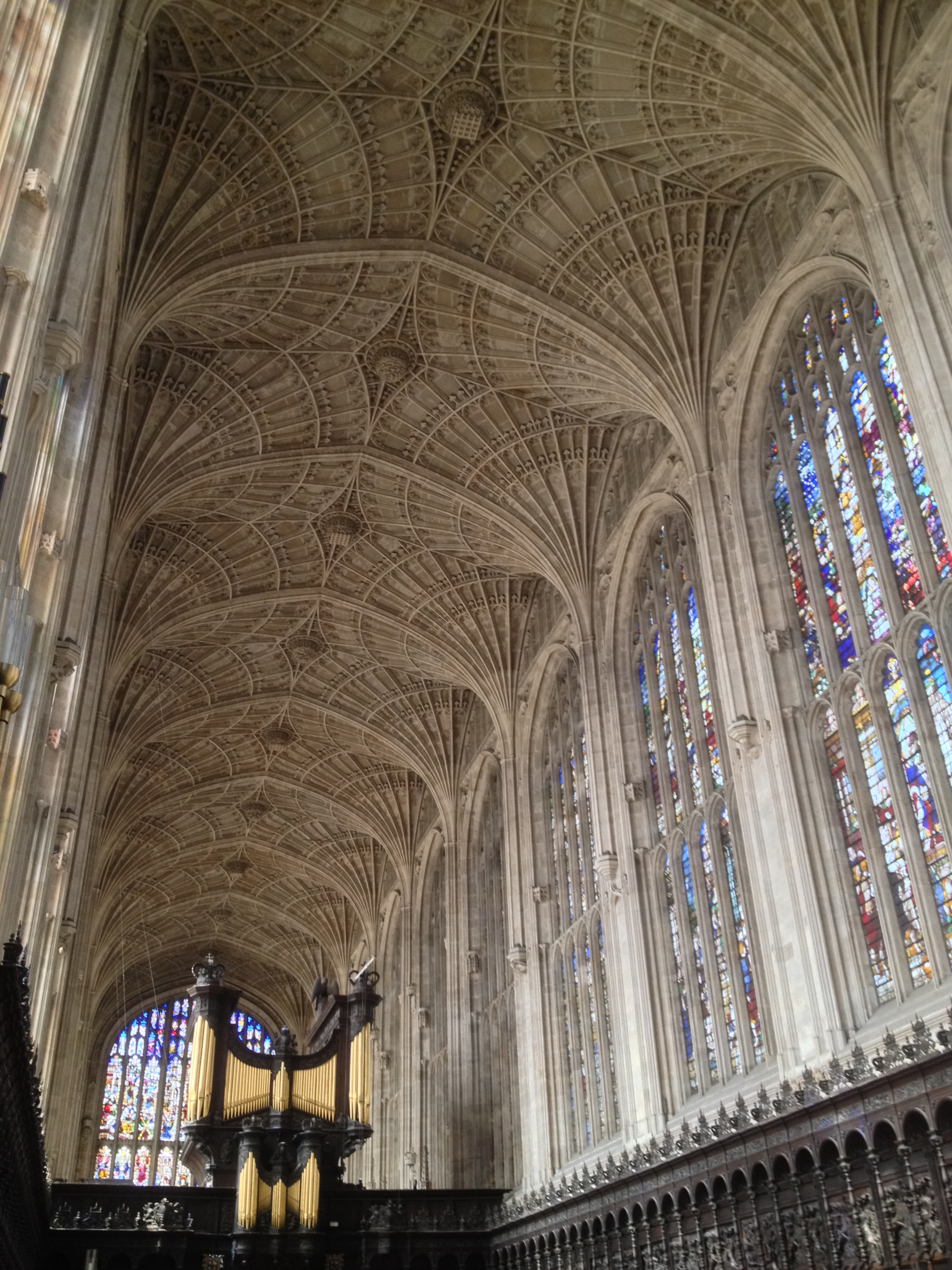
The Fan vault was used in the nave and choir of King's College Chapel (1446–51)
- Henry VII Chapel of Westminster Abbey. The chapel was built by Henry VII of England in the perpendicular style. Westminster Abbey has a unique status in England; it was formerly a monastery, and then, to avoid being abolished when Henry VIII dissolved the monasteries, it was declared to be a cathedral for ten years. Now it is a church specifically designated for the use of the King or Queen.
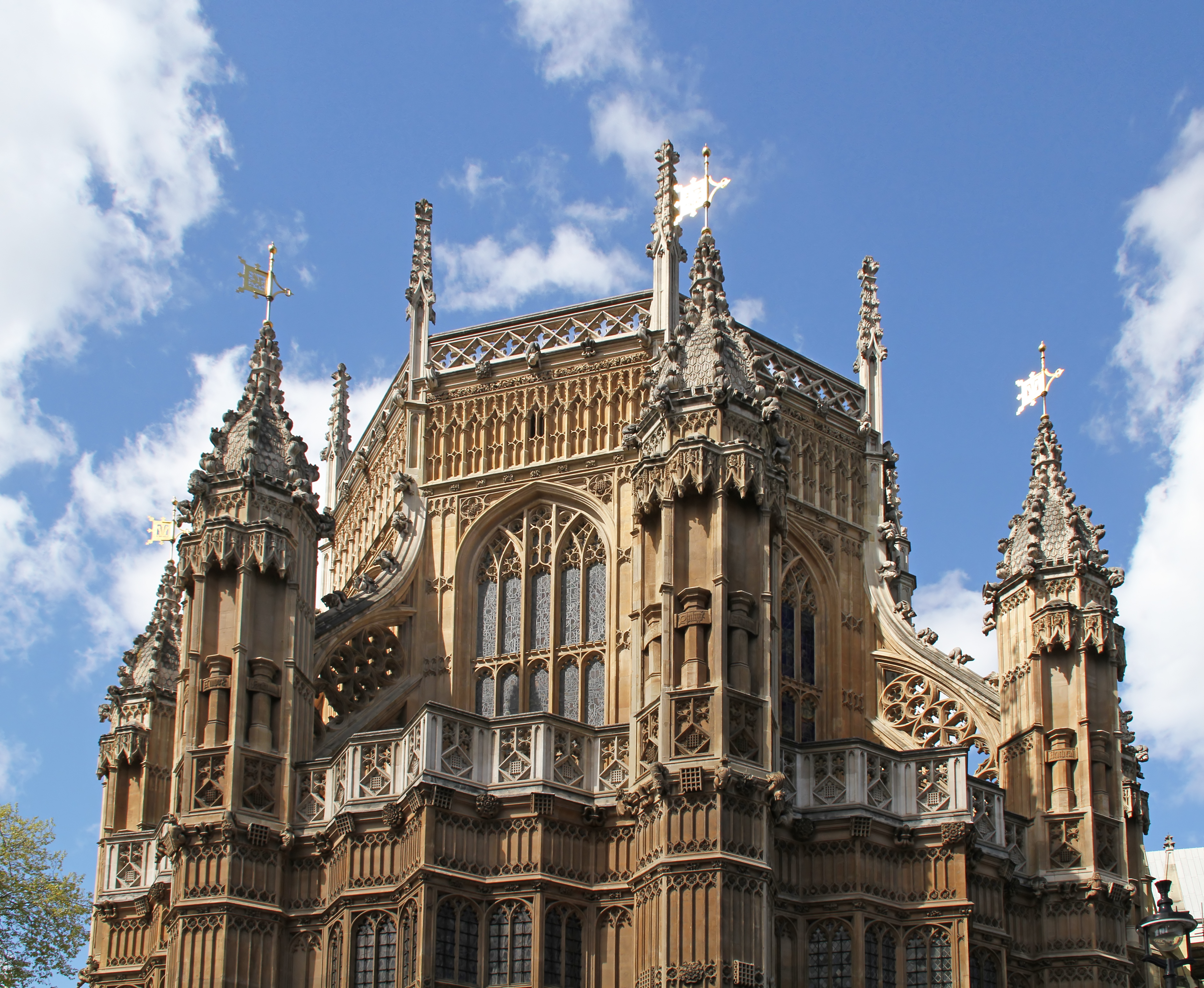
The Henry VII Chapel at Westminster Abbey, built by Henry VII of England

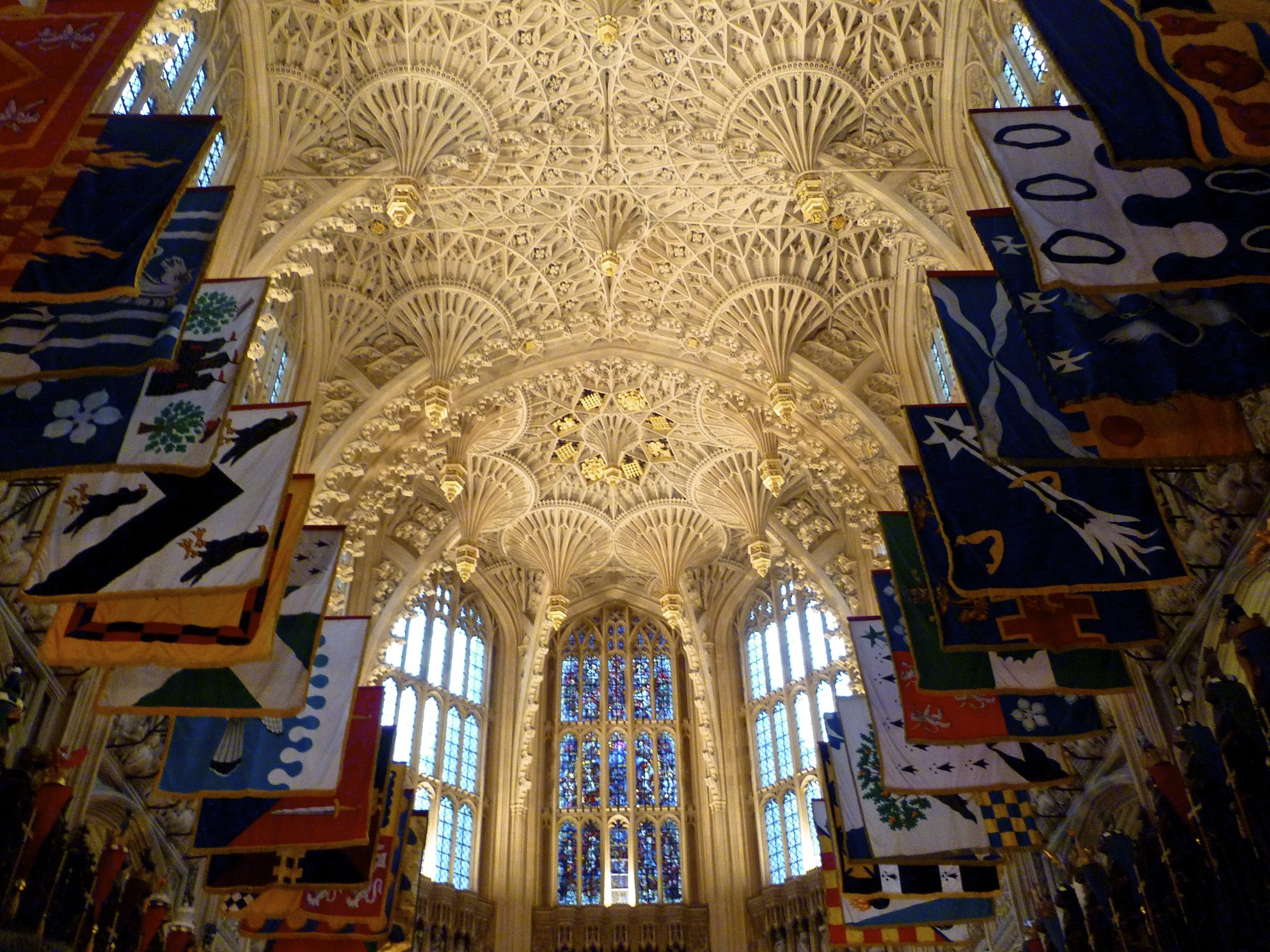
Ceiling of the Henry VII Chapel, with hanging pendant vaults

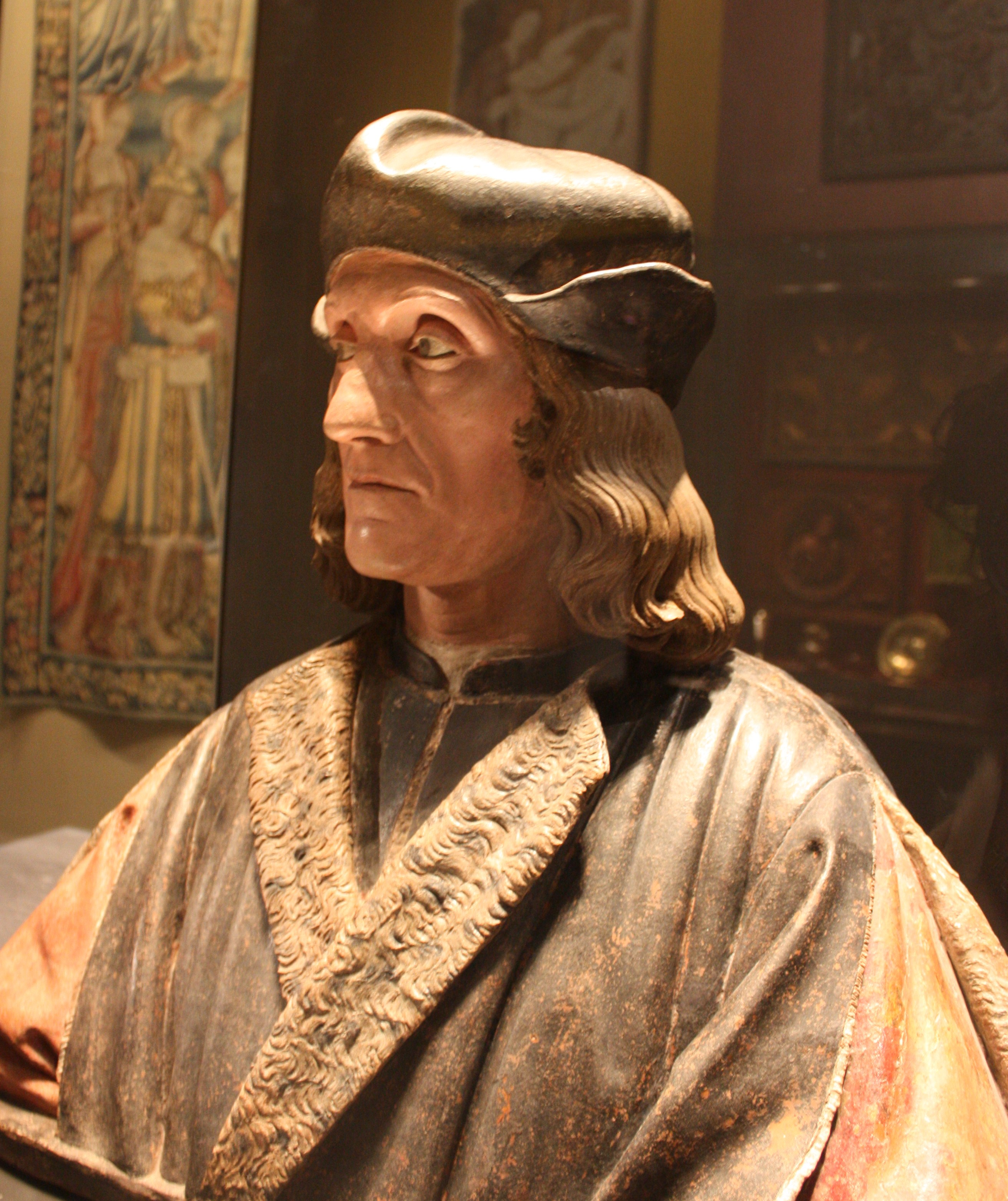
Posthumous bust of Henry VII by his tomb in the Henry VII Chapel of Westminster Abbey by Italian sculptor Pietro Torrigiani (1509)

== Transition from Gothic to Renaissance (16th century) ==
In the 16th century, a transition began in Europe from Gothic toward the classicism of the Renaissance. It began in Italy, particularly in Florence, and was based on admiration for ancient Roman models. It led to copying Greek and Roman sculpture, and then classical architectural models, such as the column, round arch and the dome.

In France, the transition was most evident at the church of Saint-Eustache, Paris in Paris, located next to the city market of Les Halles, begun in 1532 by the Italian architect Domenico da Cortona, the favourite of King Francis I of France, who also designed many of the Renaissance elements of the Palace of Fontainebleau. Because of technical and financial difficulties and the intervening Wars of Religion, it was not finished until 1640. It was largely Gothic on the exterior, but the interior was a mixture of Gothic and Renaissance classicism, such as hanging pendants from keystones of the vaults, and orders of classical columns. It received a new classical west front by Jules Hardouin-Mansart in 1754. During the French Revolution it was pillaged and turned into the Temple of Agriculture, and suffered a fire in 1844, but was restored.

The first Renaissance church in Germany, St. Anne's Church in Augsburg, also known as the Fugger Chapel (1509–1581), announced the transition with its classical decoration. Martin Luther visited the church, and it became a Lutheran church in 1545. In England, the transition took much longer, because of the break between Henry VIII and Rome. English cathedrals and churches remained Gothic throughout most of the 16th century. The English Renaissance emerged from a mixture of Tudor Gothic with Renaissance decoration, such as the realistic sculpture of Henry VII made for his tomb at Westminster Abbey by the Italian sculptor Pietro Torrigiani (1509).

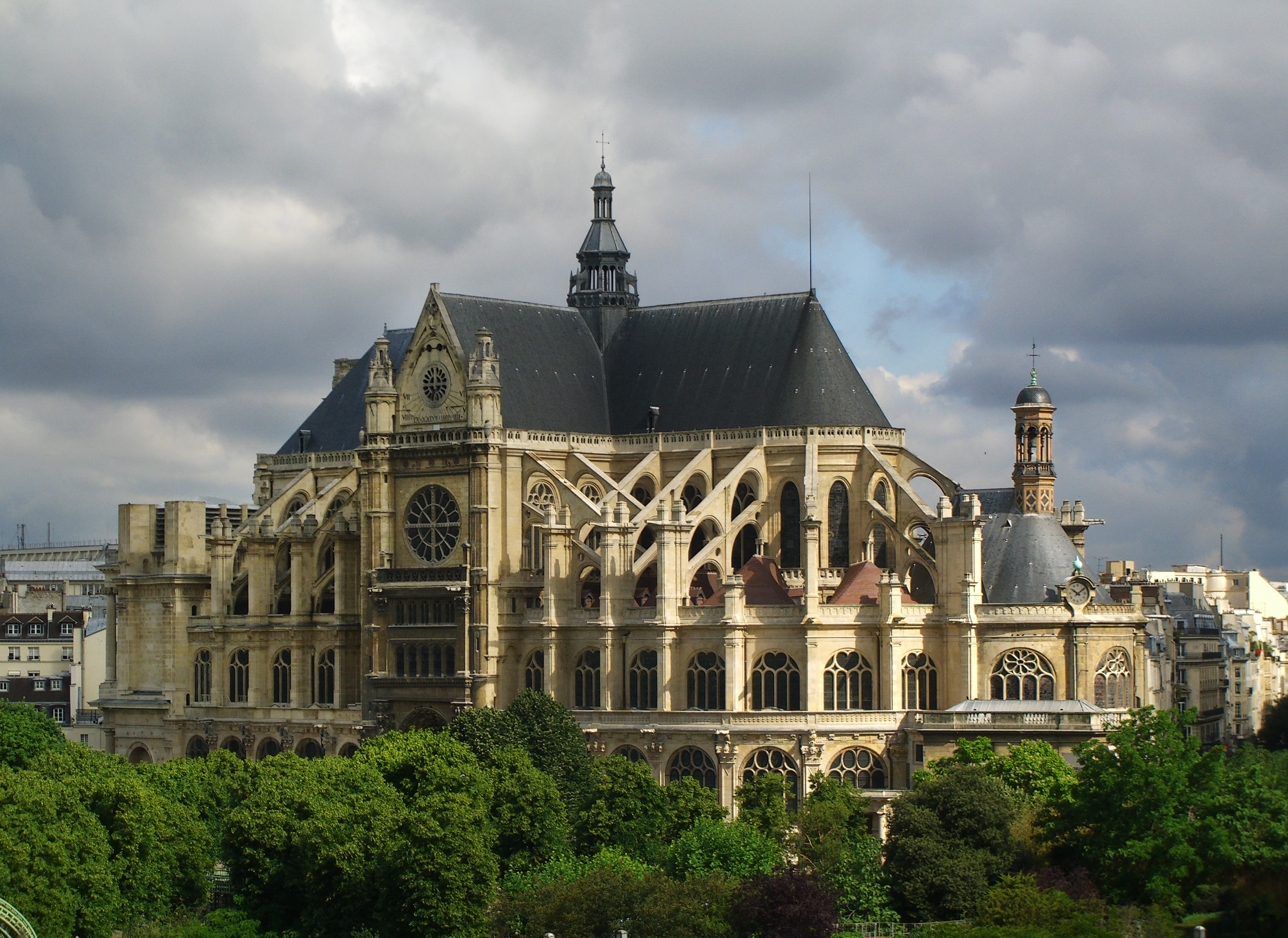
Church of Saint-Eustache, Paris (1532–1640)

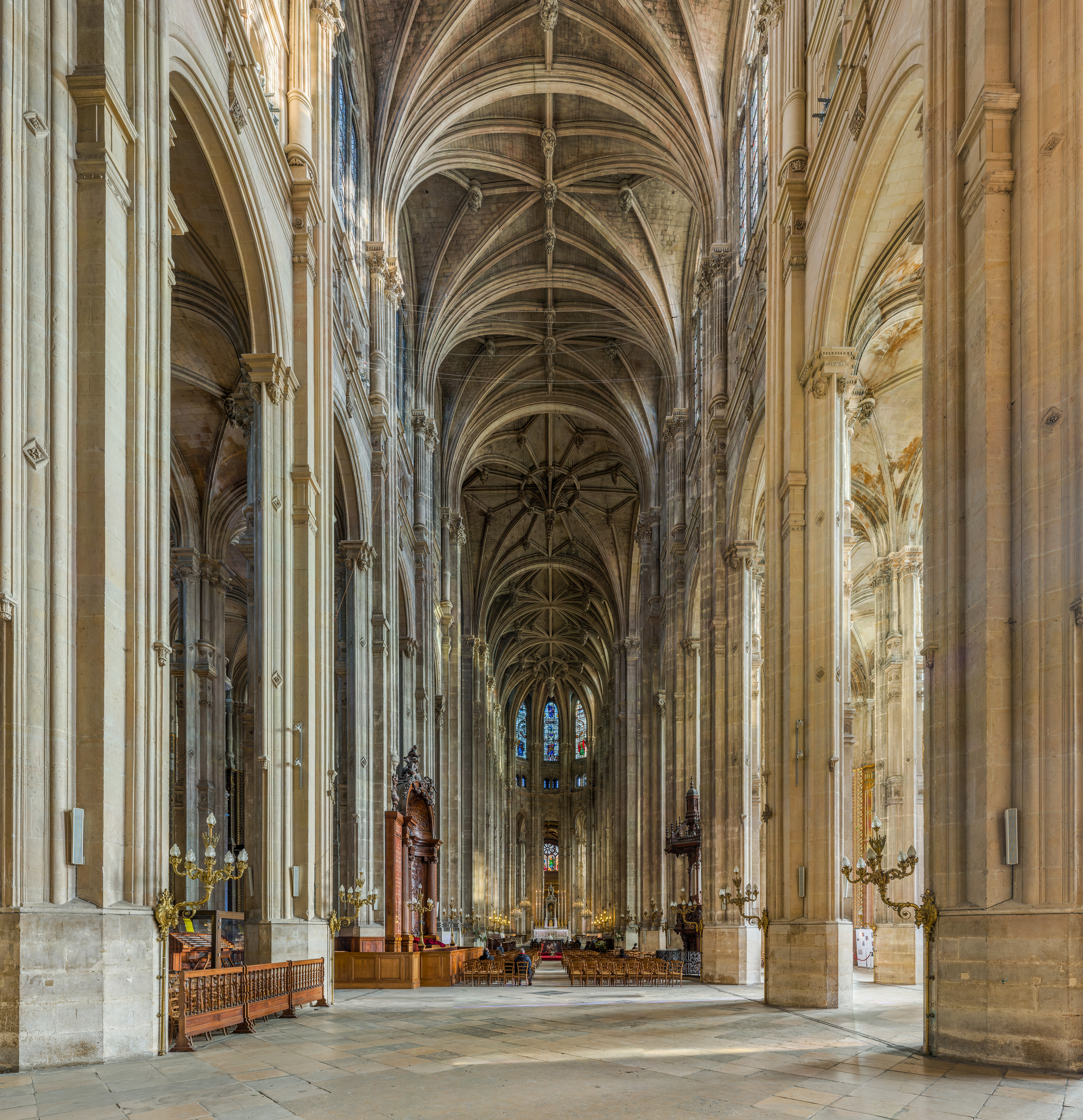
The interior of Saint-Eustance was a mixture of Gothic and Renaissance details. (1532–1640)

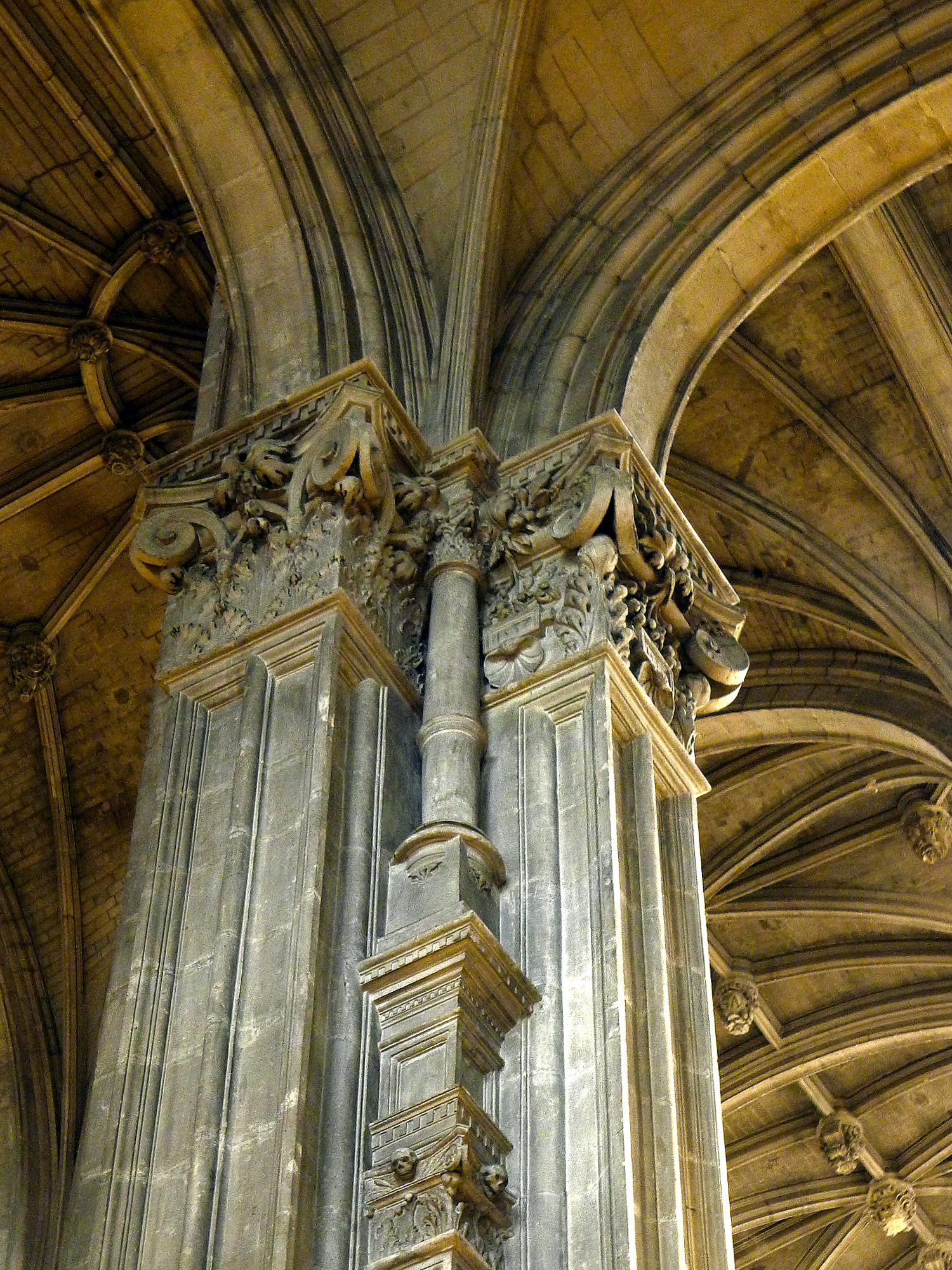
The mixture of Gothic and classical columns at Saint-Eustache

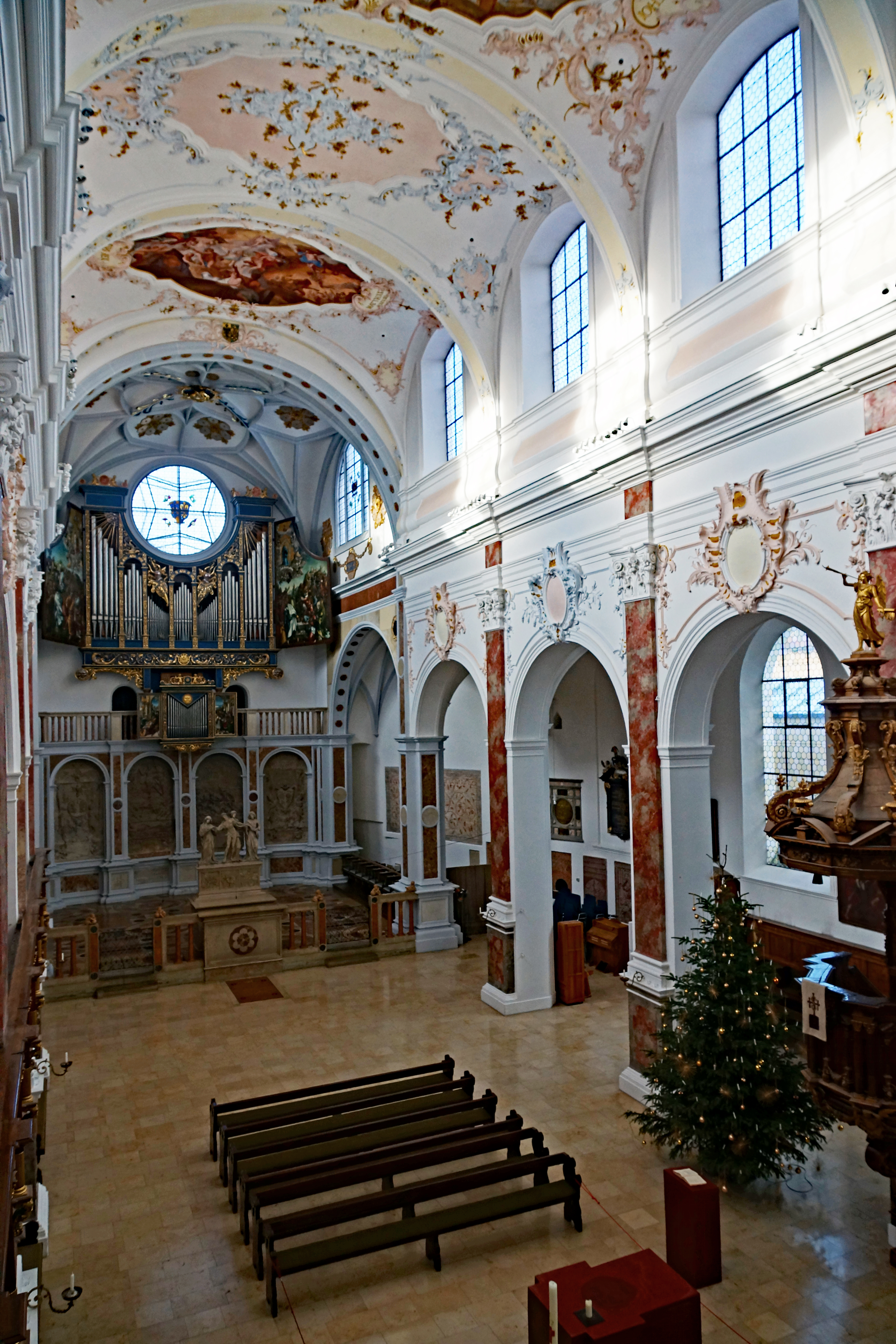
The Fugger Chapel of St. Anne's Church in Augsburg was the first Renaissance church in Germany. (1509–1581)

== Gothic Revival ==
The particular attractions of Gothic cathedrals and churches began to be rediscovered in the early 19th century. One major reason was the enormous success of the novel The Hunchback of Notre-Dame (1831) by Victor Hugo. The French writer Prosper Mérimée was designed by King Louis Philippe I to classify and, where possible, restore Gothic cathedrals and churches. He commissioned Eugène Viollet-le-Duc, and began with the restoration of Vézelay Abbey. Even larger projects launched for the restoration of Sainte-Chapelle, the Basilica of Saint-Denis and Notre-Dame de Paris. Some of the restoration was made more on the basis of imagination than historical accuracy; so many cumulative modifications had been made over the centuries, that it was impossible to recreate any church exactly as it was at any one particular time, as Viollet-le-Duc acknowledged. He was criticized in particular for designing a taller and more ornate spire to the Notre Dame Cathedral to replace the original 13th-century spire, which had been removed in 1786. He was also criticized for replacing the sculpture of gargoyles, chimeras and other mythical creatures, which had been removed in the 18th century, with new versions.

In the mid-19th century, several notable Gothic cathedrals and churches were constructed in Europe and beyond. These included the Basilica of St. Clotilde (1846–57) in Paris, by the architect Leon Vautrin. This church served as a model for the façade of another new church, Sacred Heart Cathedral, built in Guangzhou, China between 1863 and 1868, financed in part by contributions from French Emperor Napoleon III.

In the 20th century, Neo-Gothic cathedrals were constructed, particularly by the Episcopal Church in the United States, taking advantage of the new technologies of iron and steel construction and reinforced concrete, combined with traditional forms. Examples include the National Cathedral in Washington, D.C. (begun 1907) and Grace Cathedral in San Francisco (1928–1964). Construction of the National Cathedral in Washington, D.C. in 1907, but was still underway at the beginning of the 21st century. The rose window (1977) was dedicated by President Jimmy Carter and Queen Elizabeth II of the United Kingdom.

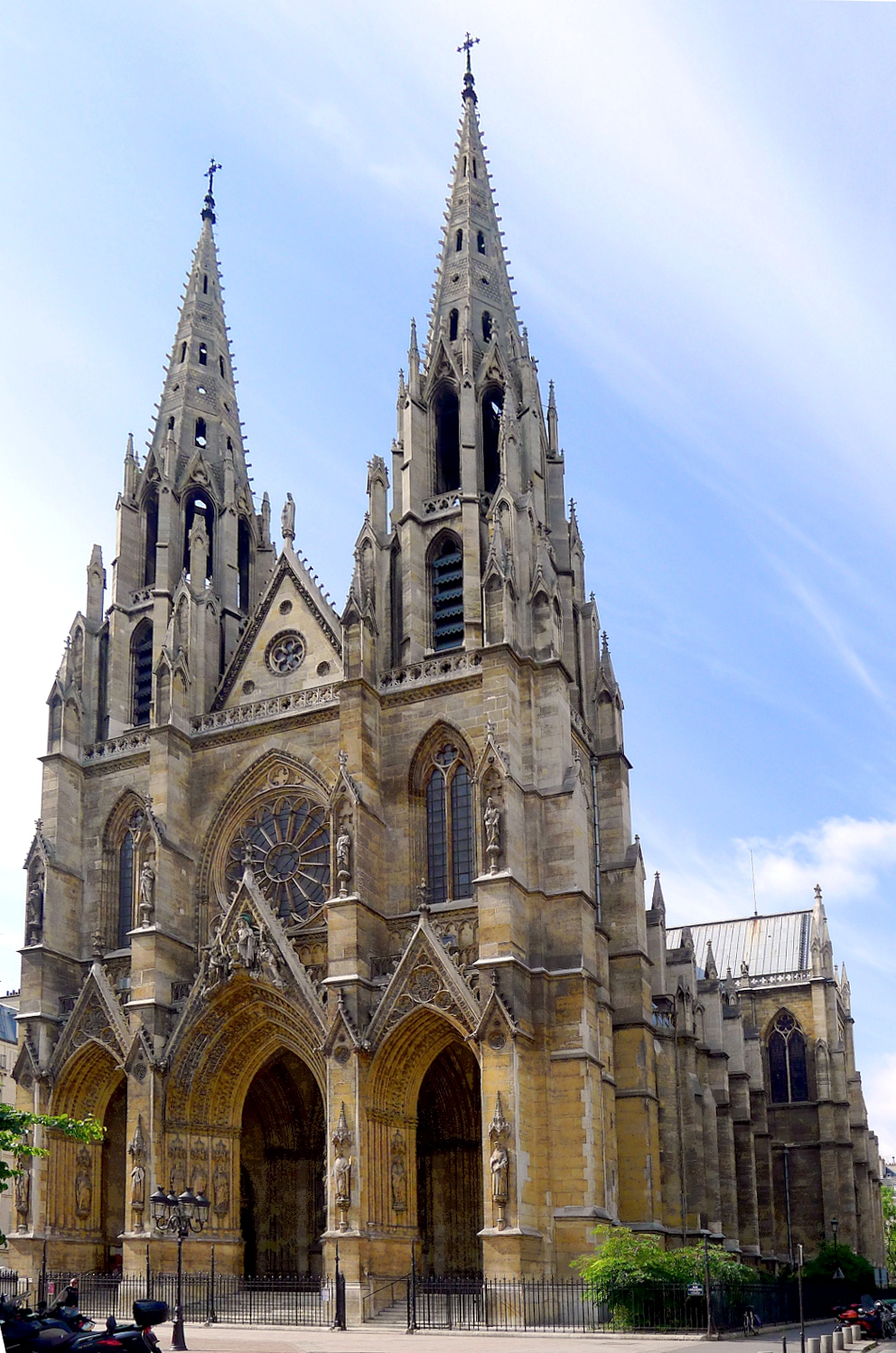
Basilica of St. Clotilde, Paris (1846–57)

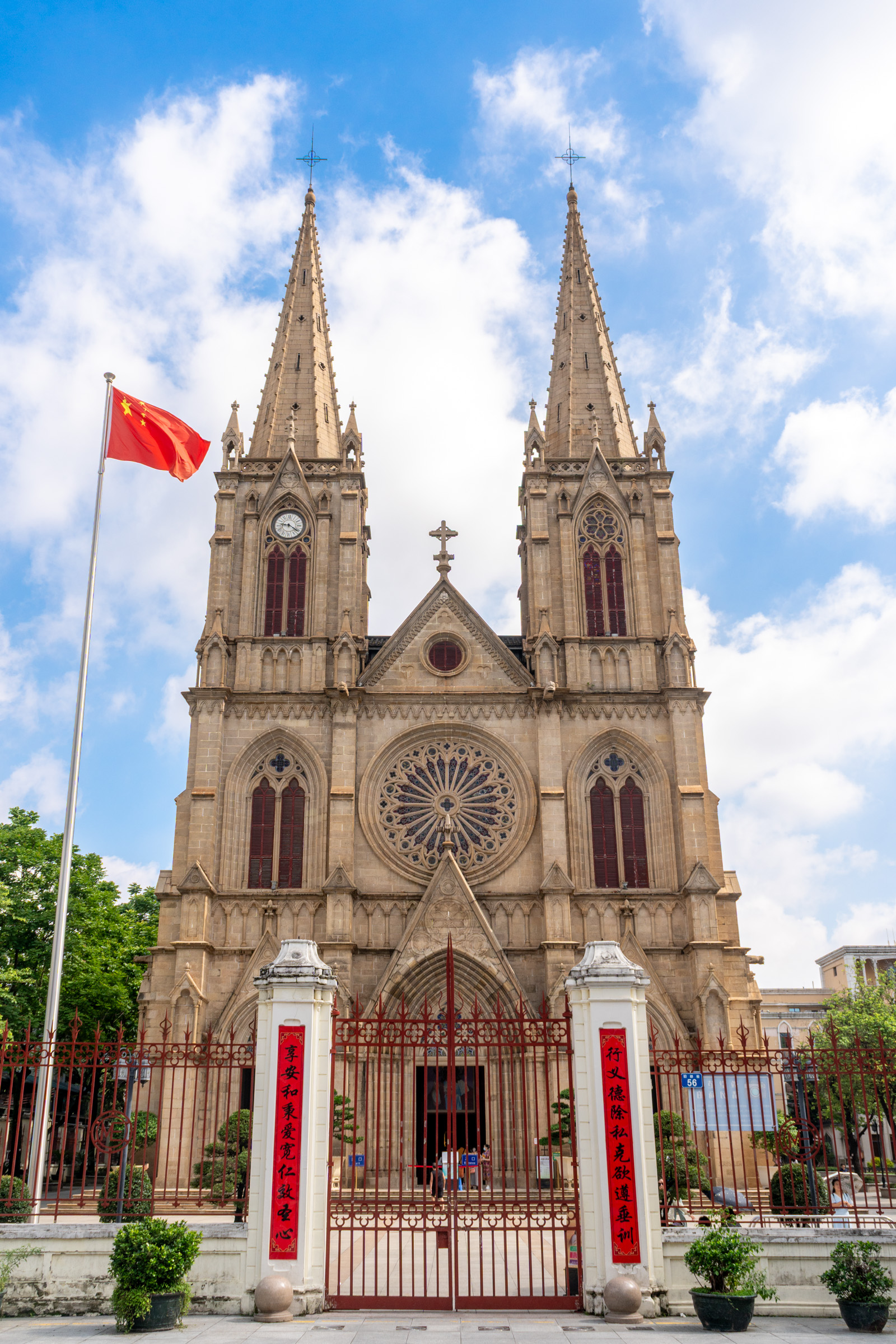
Sacred Heart Cathedral, Guangzhou, China (1863–68)

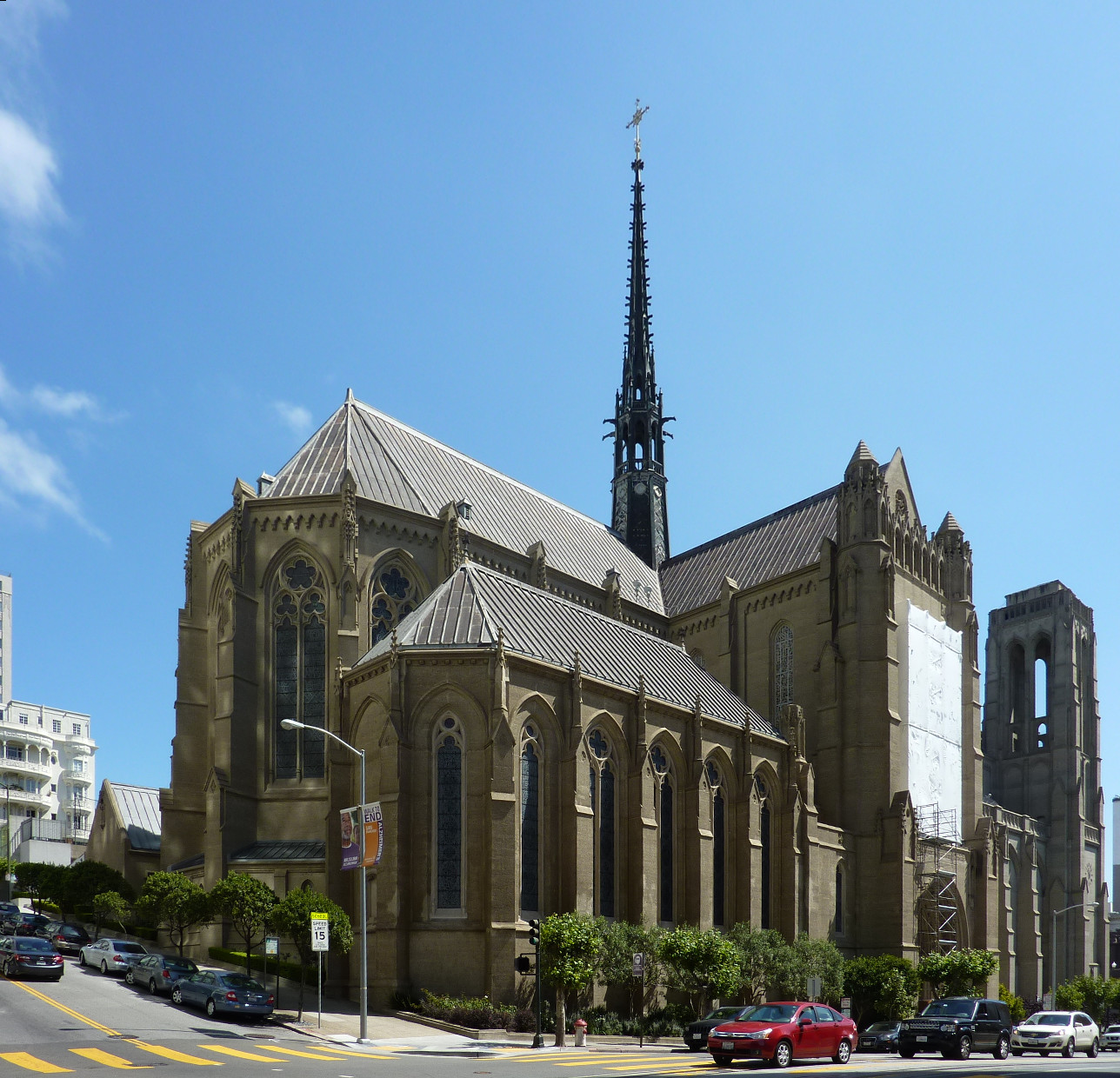
Grace Cathedral in San Francisco (1928–1964)

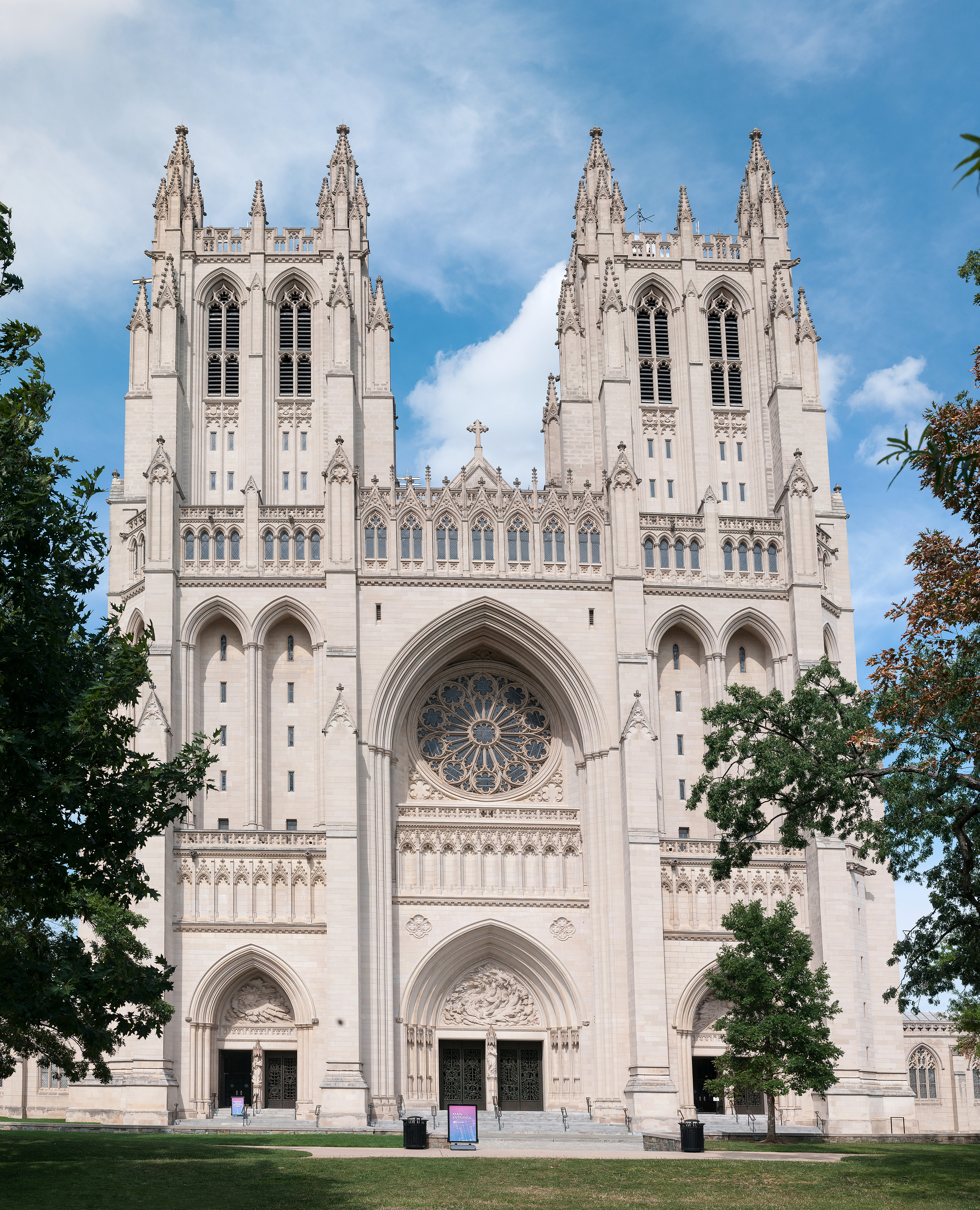
Washington National Cathedral (begun 1907)

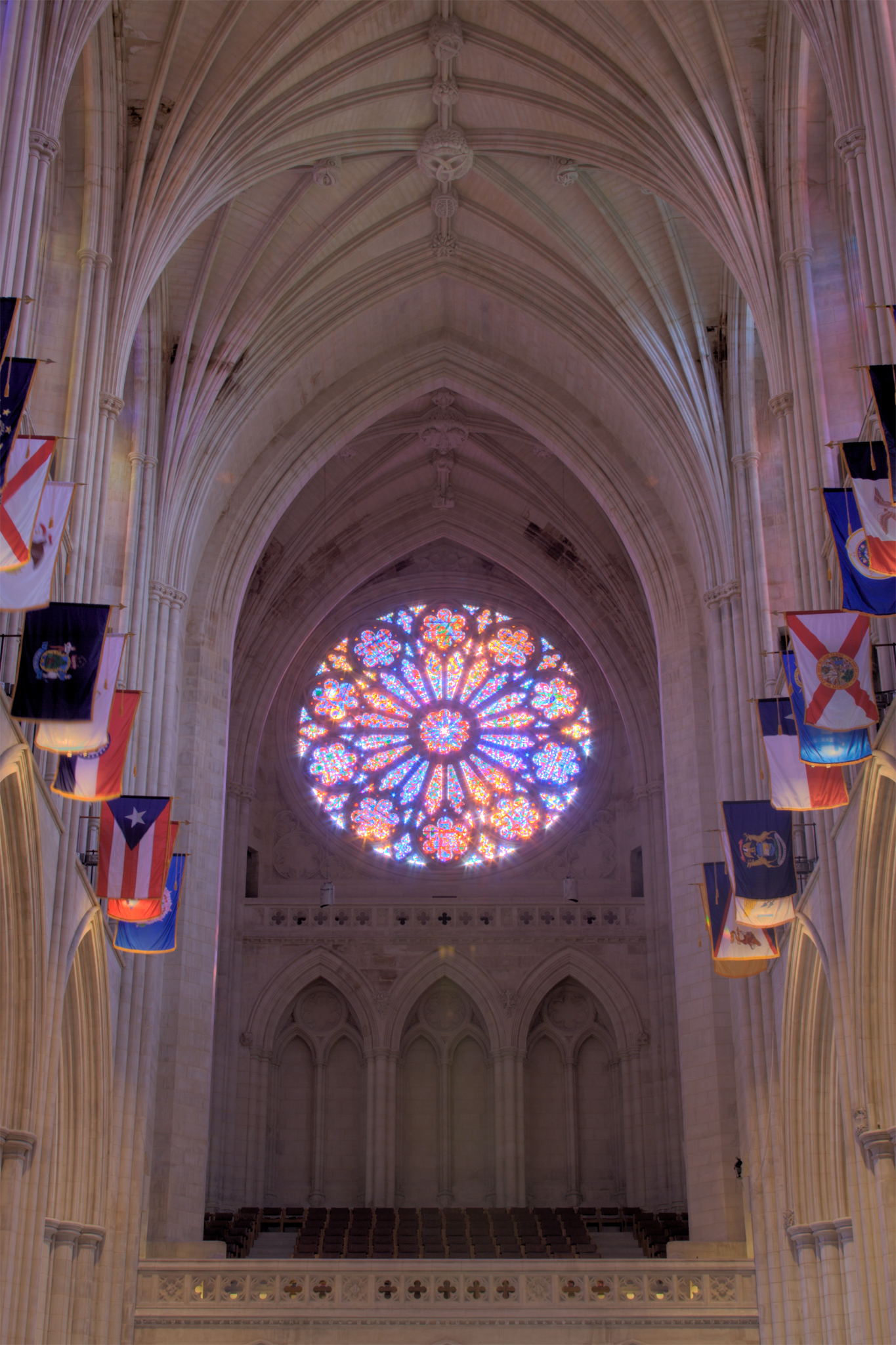
Rose window of National Cathedral (1977)

== The choir – a theater for ceremony ==
A Gothic cathedral or church was a house of worship and also a theater for ceremony, with a fixed ritual every day. The most numerous participants in these ceremonies were the canons, or members of the Cathedral chapter. The number of canons in a chapter varied from twelve in a small cathedral to fifty at Notre Dame de Paris and more than eighty at Laon Cathedral. In addition to celebrating Mass, every day, they were expected to celebrate the Liturgy of the Hours four times a day, with four additional offices on Sundays. To this very regular schedule were attached numerous additional duties and ceremonies.

Most of these ceremonies took place in the choir (sometimes spelled 'quire') of the cathedral, toward the eastern end, between the nave to the west and the sanctuary to the east. The choir was like a church within the church; it was divided from the rest of the cathedral by an ornamental screen composed of bas-reliefs illustrating stories from the life of Christ. It also featured a richly decorated tribune, used for reading the appropriate texts from the bible. The main altar was also found within the choir, turned toward the east. The canons were seated in two rows of carved wooden seats, facing each other, at right angles to the seats in the nave. There is just one remaining original medieval rood screen in a Gothic cathedral, at Albi Cathedral in the south of France.

The remaining original Gothic rood screen, in Albi Cathedral

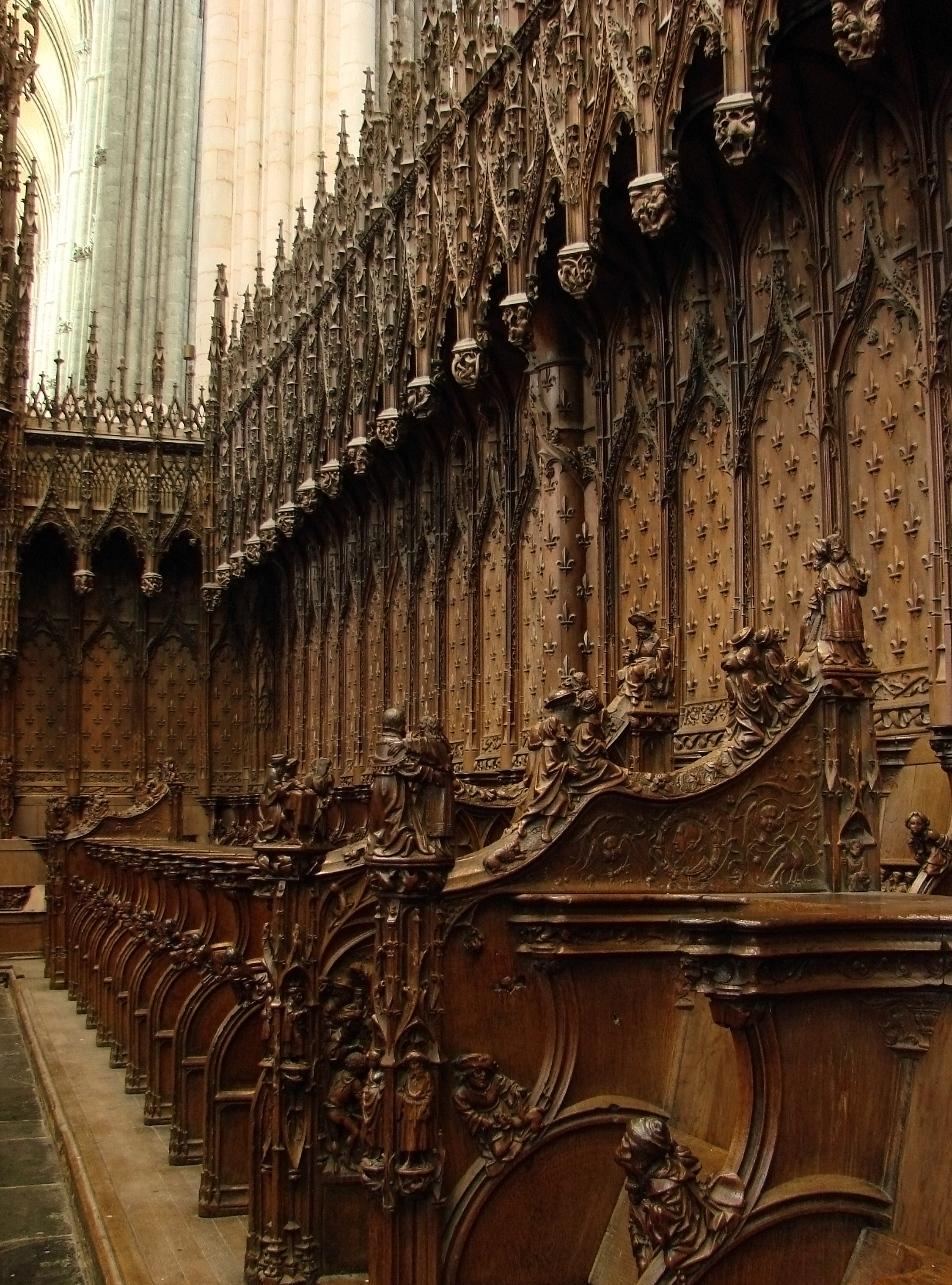
Choir stalls in Amiens Cathedral

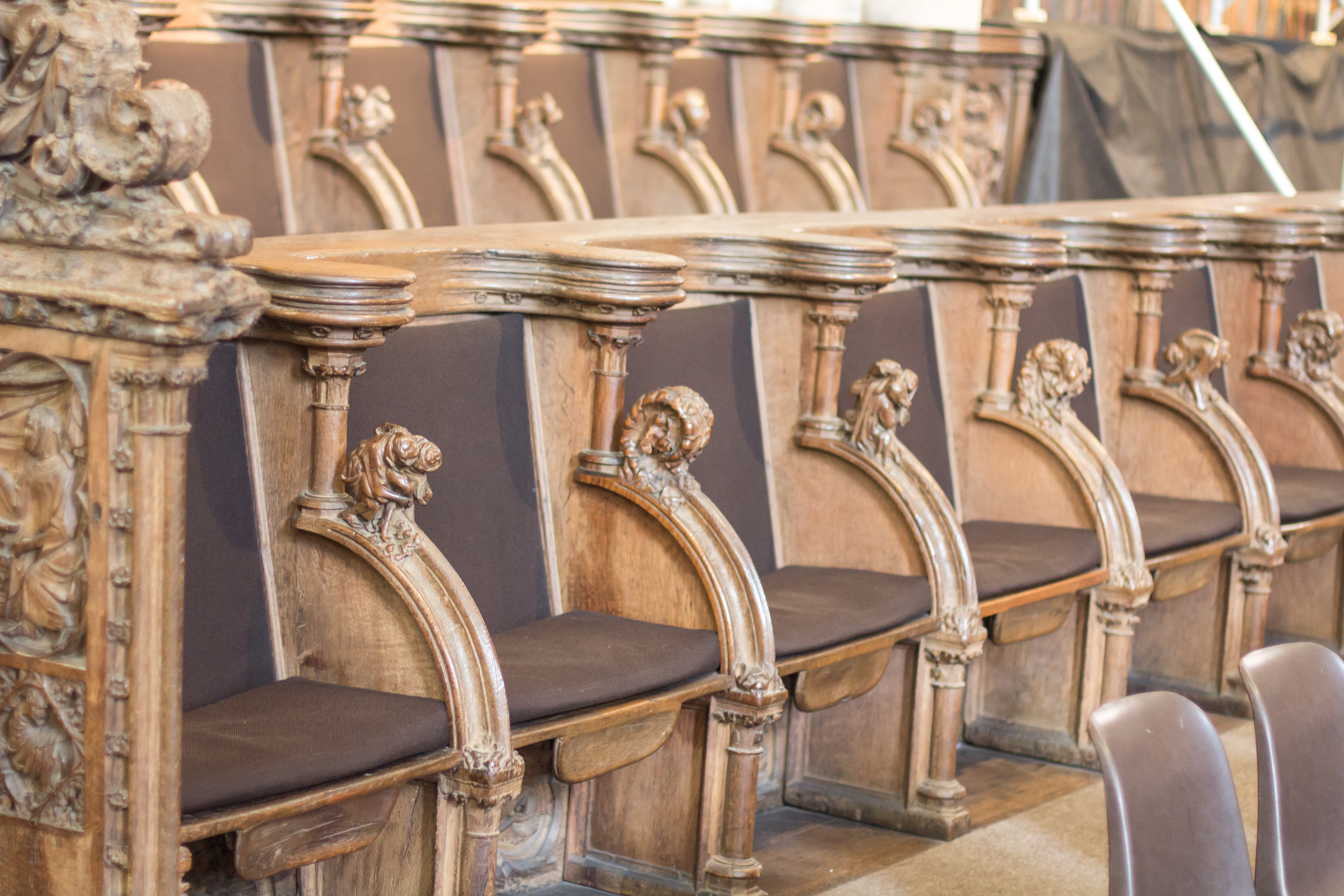
Choir stalls in Cologne Cathedral

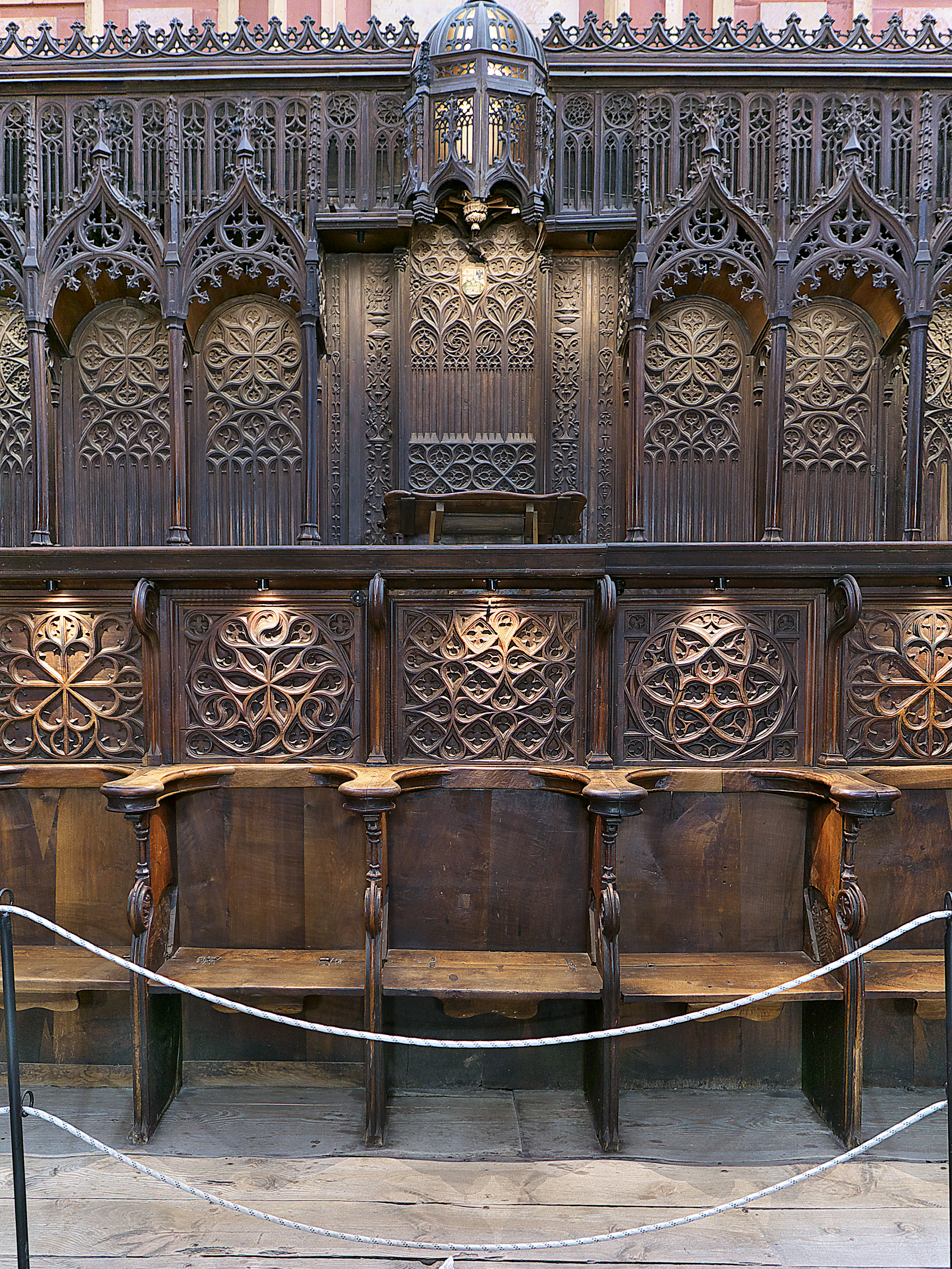
Choir stalls in Segovia Cathedral

== Stained glass ==
Stained glass windows were a prominent feature of the Gothic church and cathedral from the beginning. Abbot Suger, who considered that light was a manifestation of the divine, installed colorful windows in the ambulatory of Basilica of Saint Denis, and they were featured in all the major cathedrals in France, England and the rest of Europe. In the 13th and 14th century they became larger and larger, until they filled entirely walls. However, they lost some of the original simplicity and richness of color, as the artists competed with painters and fresco artists in making huge windows crowded with naturalistic figures.

In the Middle Ages, glass makers and stained glass artists were separate professions. Glass makers worked near forests, where there was abundant firewood for melting and forming glass, while the artists worked closer to the building sites. In the earlier cathedrals and churches, the range of colors was limited, and the color was added when the glass was manufactured. with the use of metallic oxides; cobalt for blue, copper for a ruby red, manganese for purple, and antimony for yellow. The glass was melted with the colors, blown, shaped into cylinders, rolled flat, and then cut into sheets of about 10–12 inches (25–30 centimetres). The pieces of glass of early windows varied considerably in thickness, which gave more richness and variation than in later windows.

The colored glass was delivered to the workshop of the artist, where the window was made. A large whitewashed table was painted with the full-size drawing of the window, with colors indicated. the artisans used a hot iron to crack off pieces of colored glass to fit the pattern, "grazed" or smoothed the edges, then fit them into long strips of lead. The strips of lead with glass were then assembled and soldered together. Details such as faces, ornament and inscriptions were painted on the glass in vitreous enamel, then heated to fuse the enamel with the glass. The window was then waterproofed with putty along the lead strips, and then, since the lead was flexible, cited into a larger iron frame.

As windows continued to grow in size, they needed further support against the wind, This was provided by tracery and mullions, thin stone ribs into which the sections of the windows were fit. As the windows grew larger, the tracery became more and more intricate, taking on Rayonnant and flamboyant designs. In this way the architecture and windows gradually became blended together and inseparable.

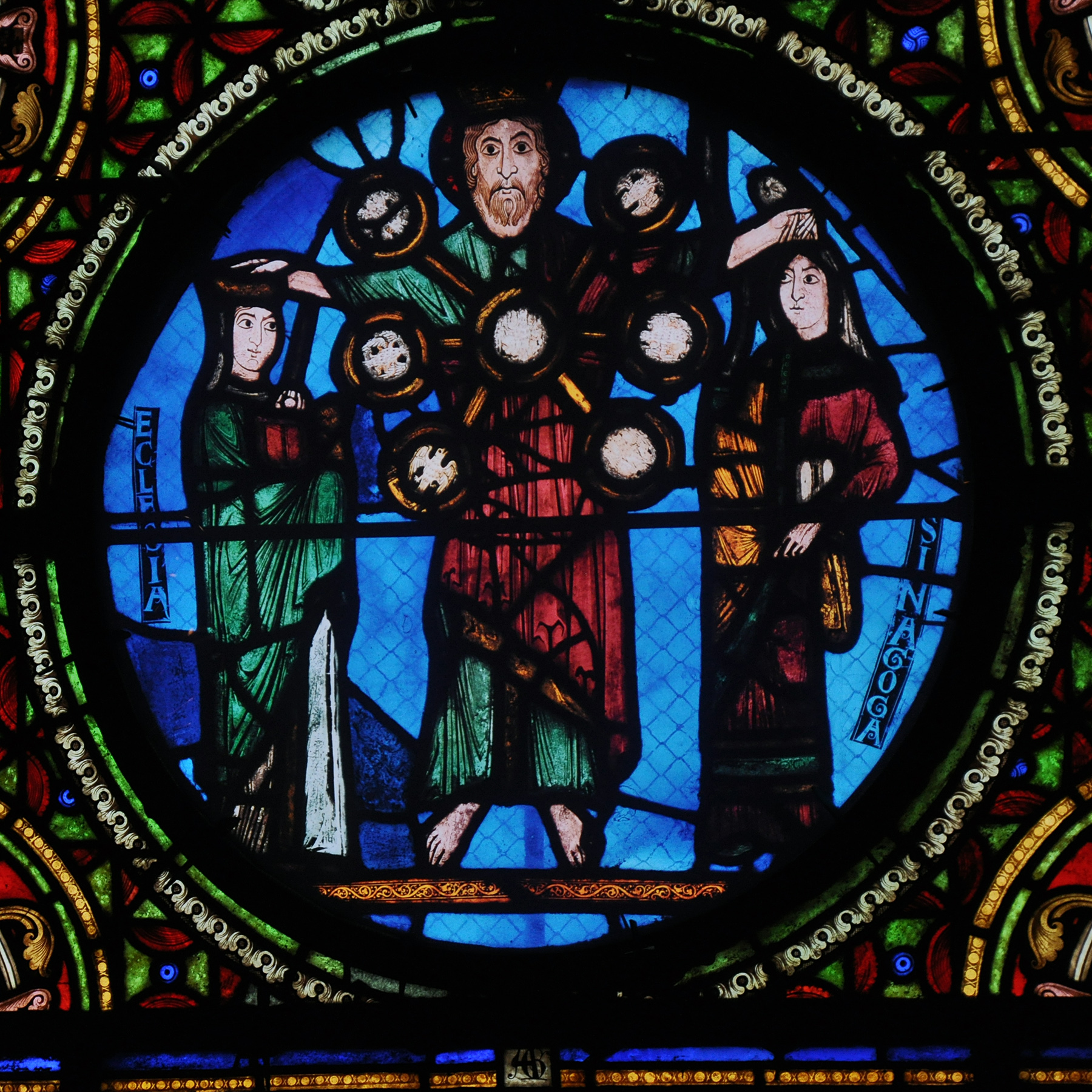
Christ between figures representing church and the synagogue, Basilica of Saint-Denis (12th century)

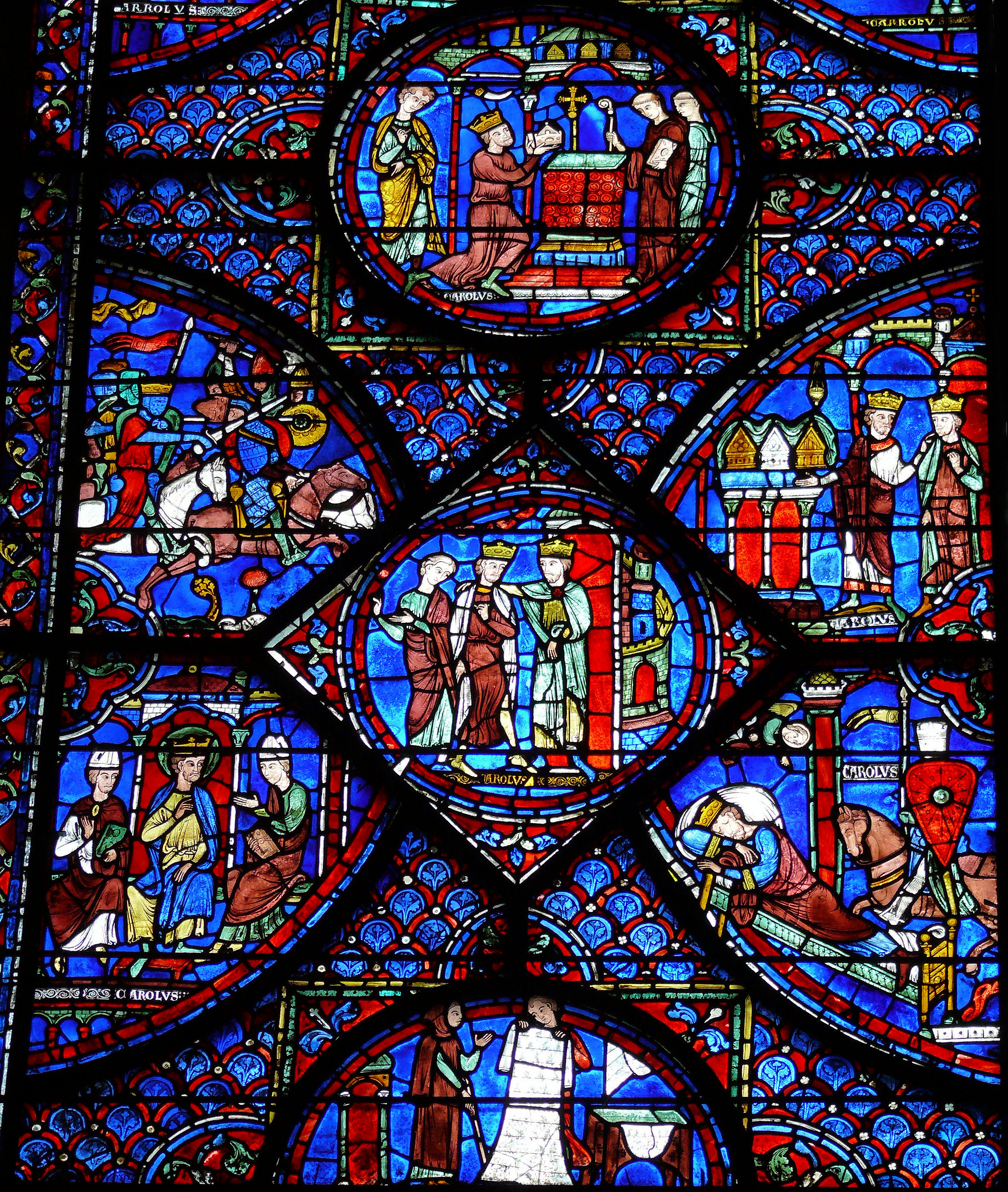
Detail of Life of Charlemagne, Bay 7 of Chartres Cathedral (1225)

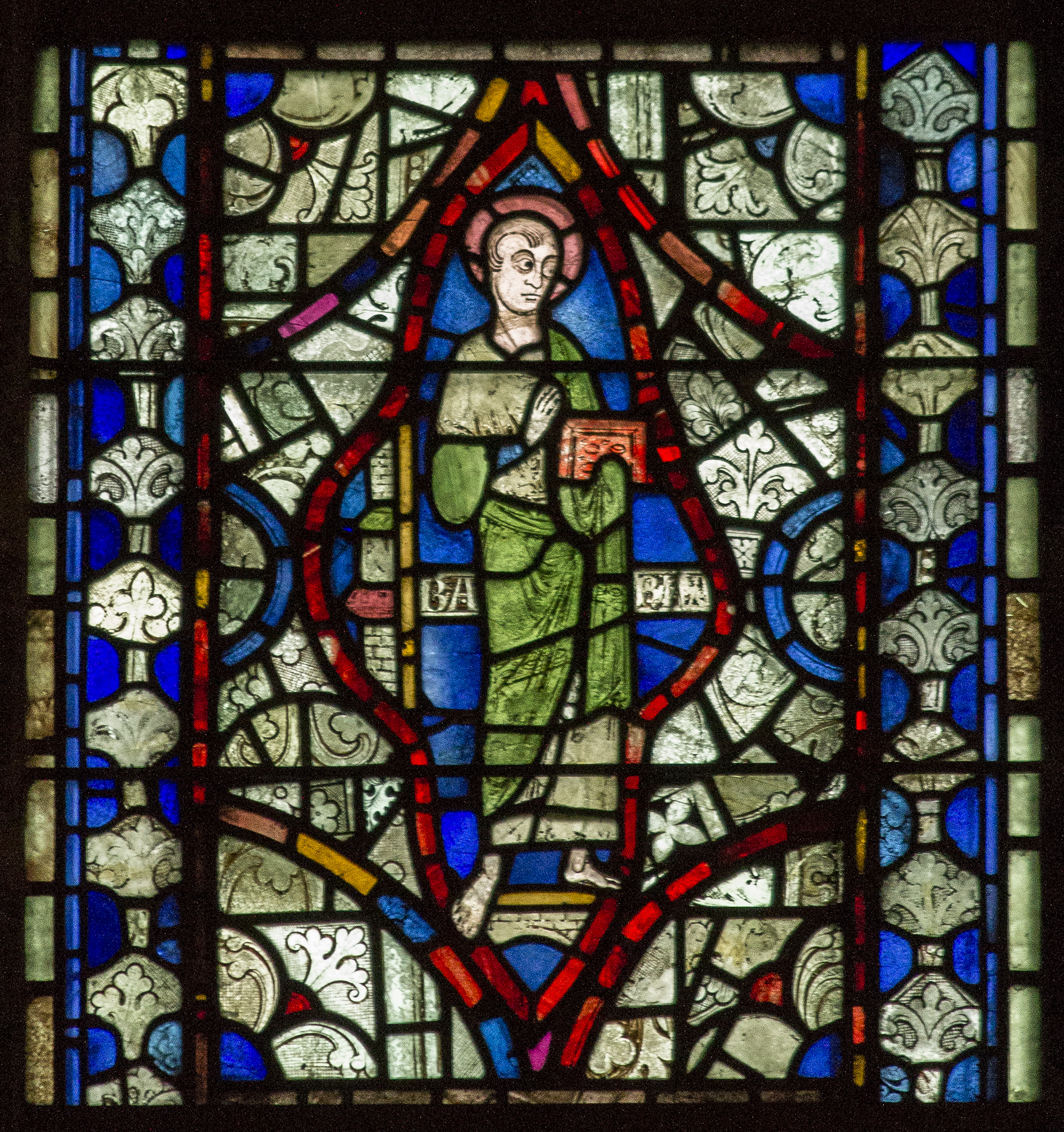
Saint Barnabas, detail of window of Lincoln Cathedral (1201–1235)

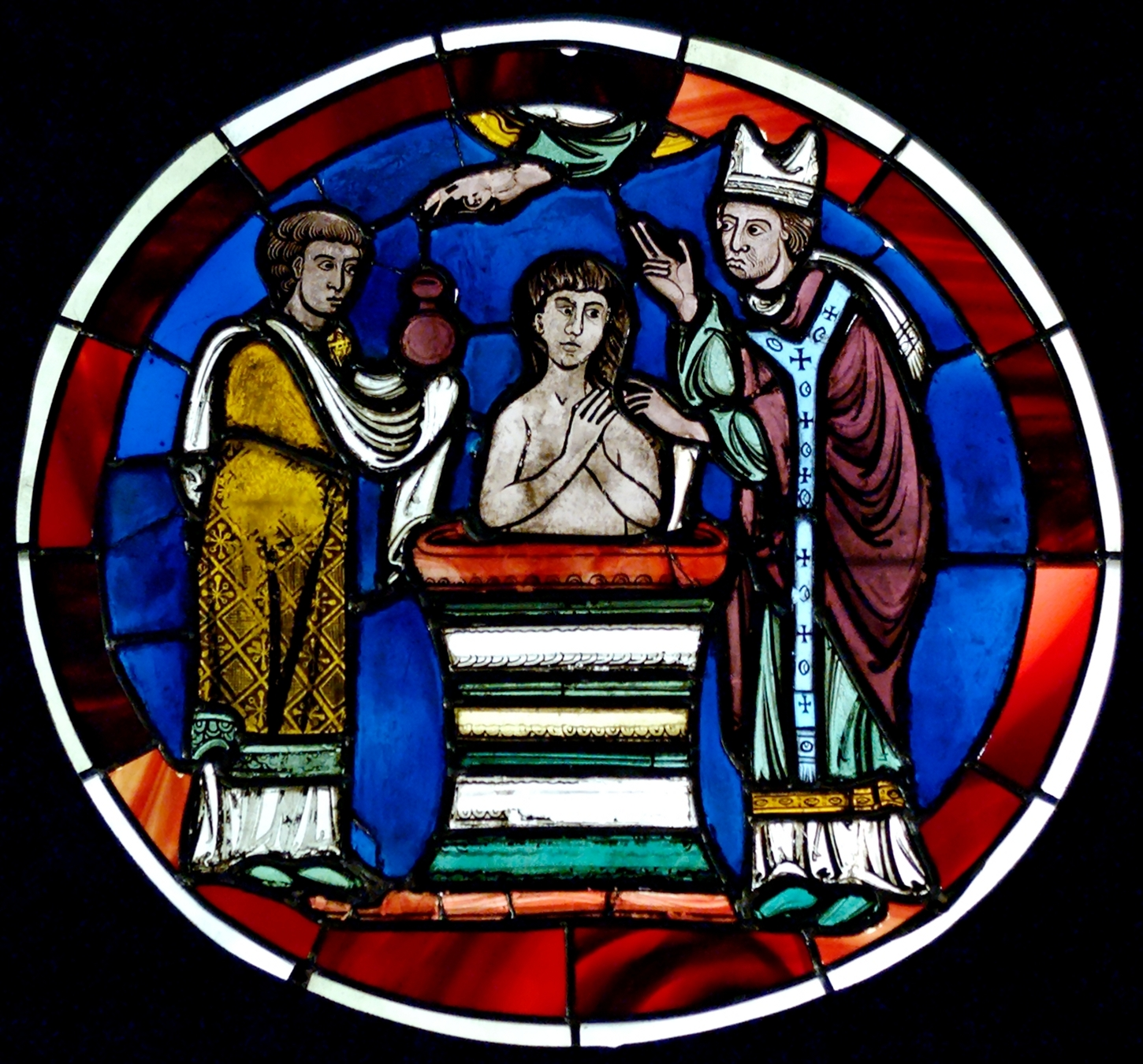
Detail of baptism scene of stained glass from Sainte-Chapelle now in Cluny Museum (1238–48)

=== Rose windows ===
Circular windows, called oculi, had existed in Roman times, and simple version had been used in Romanesque churches. One early example is Pomposa Abbey in Pomposa, Italy, from the 10th century. Gothic windows had a more important position, over the portal on the west end, and surpassed the earlier windows in size and complexity. The Abbey of Saint Denis had a small rose window on the west façade, above the three deep bays of the portals, an arrangement followed by subsequent cathedrals in France. In the 12th century, large rose windows were also added to the north and south transepts. The transept roses at Notre Dame date to 1250 (north) and 1260 (south). Besides Notre Dame, other notable Rayonnant windows were constructed at Reims Cathedral and Amiens Cathedral. These featured additional subdividing bars, arches and circles. From France, the rose window spread to Spain (Burgos Cathedral), England (Lincoln Cathedral) and Italy (Carrara Cathedral). The later Flamboyant rose windows became much more free in their designs, with sinuous, double-curved bars. Examples are found at Beauvais Cathedral (early 16th century).

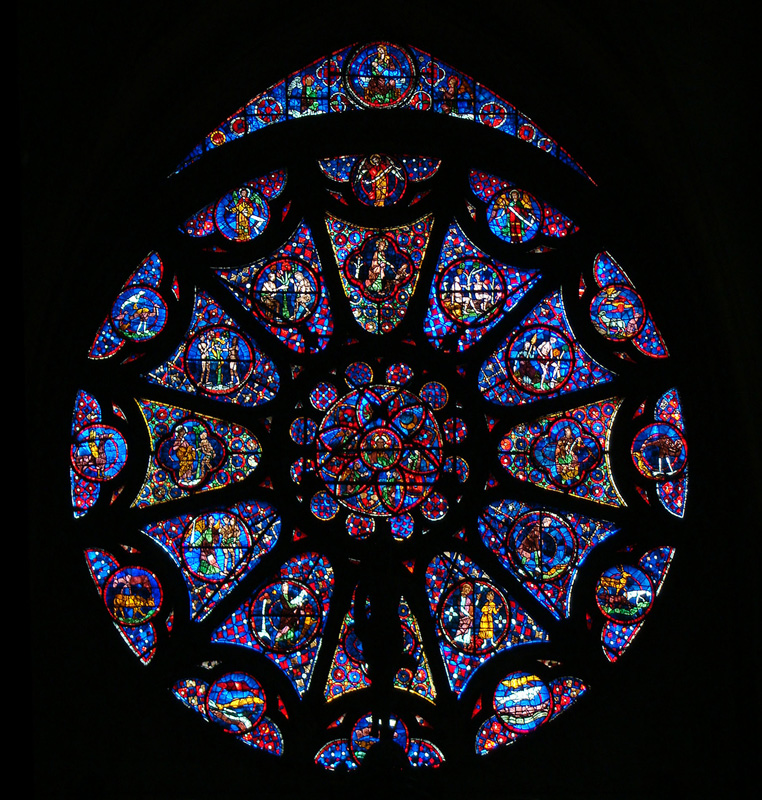
Reims Cathedral, Rayonnant north transept rose window (1211–1345)

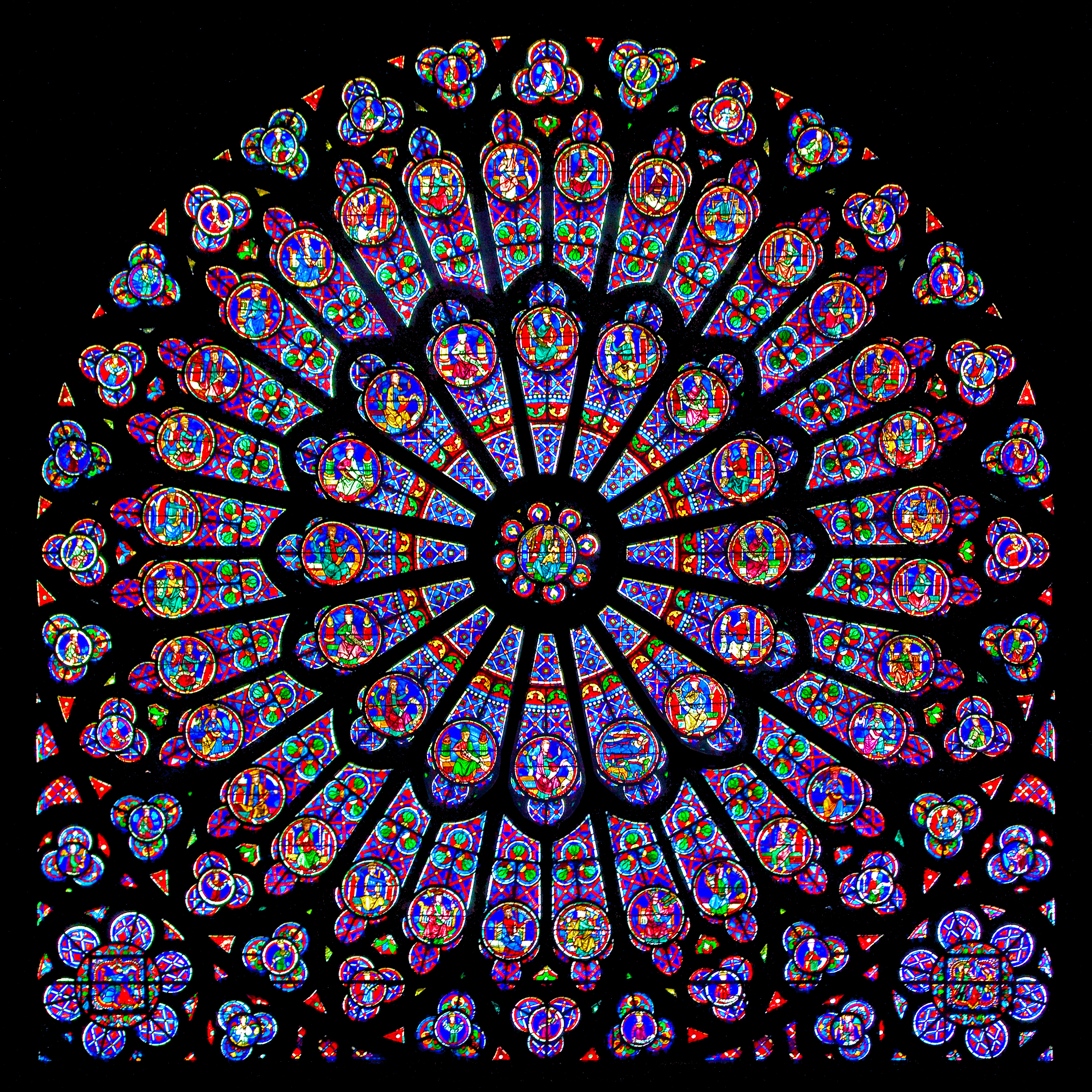
Notre Dame de Paris, Rayonnant north transept window (about 1250)

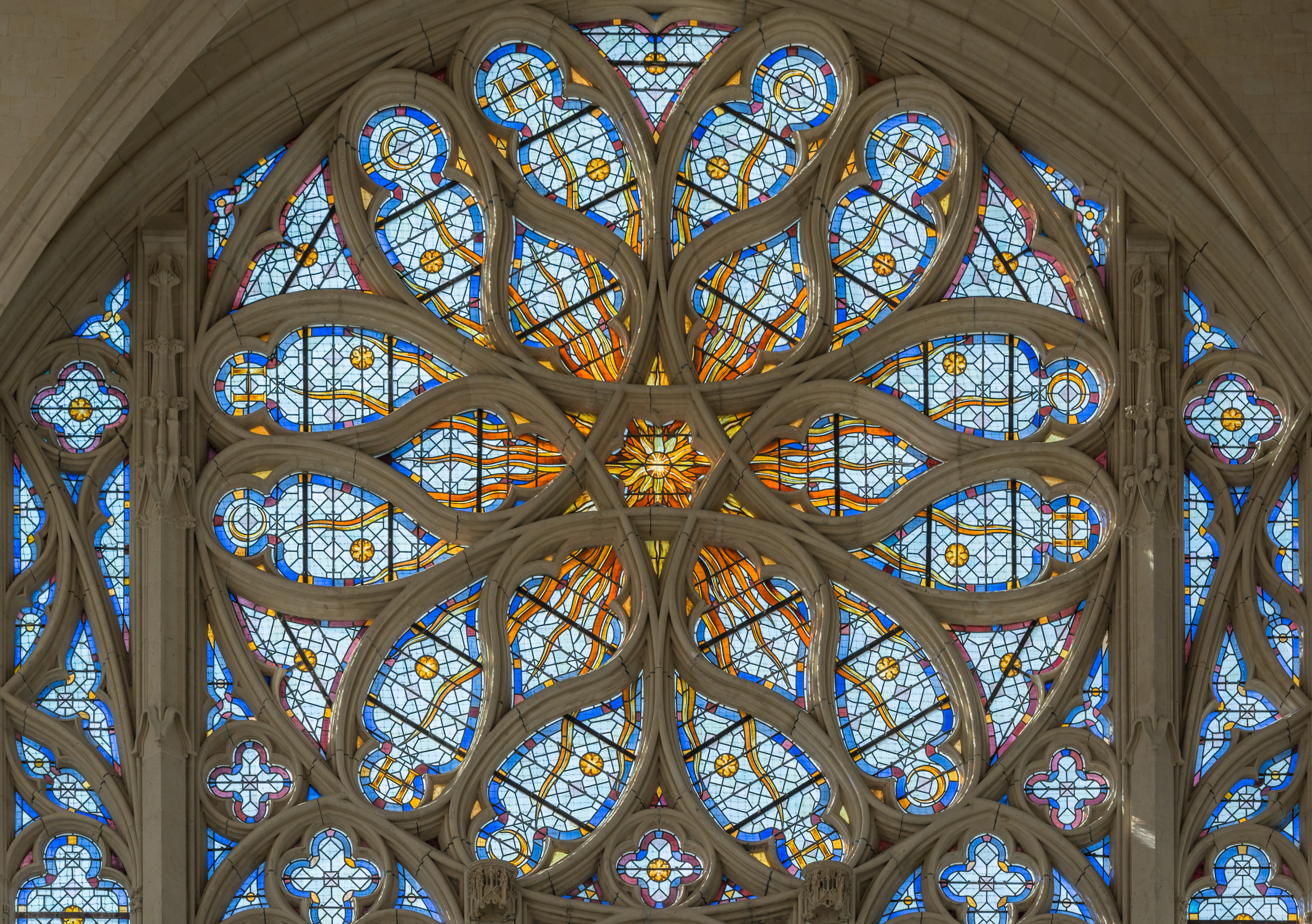
Flamboyant rose window of Sainte-Chapelle de Vincennes (original glass smashed during the French Revolution) (1379–1480)

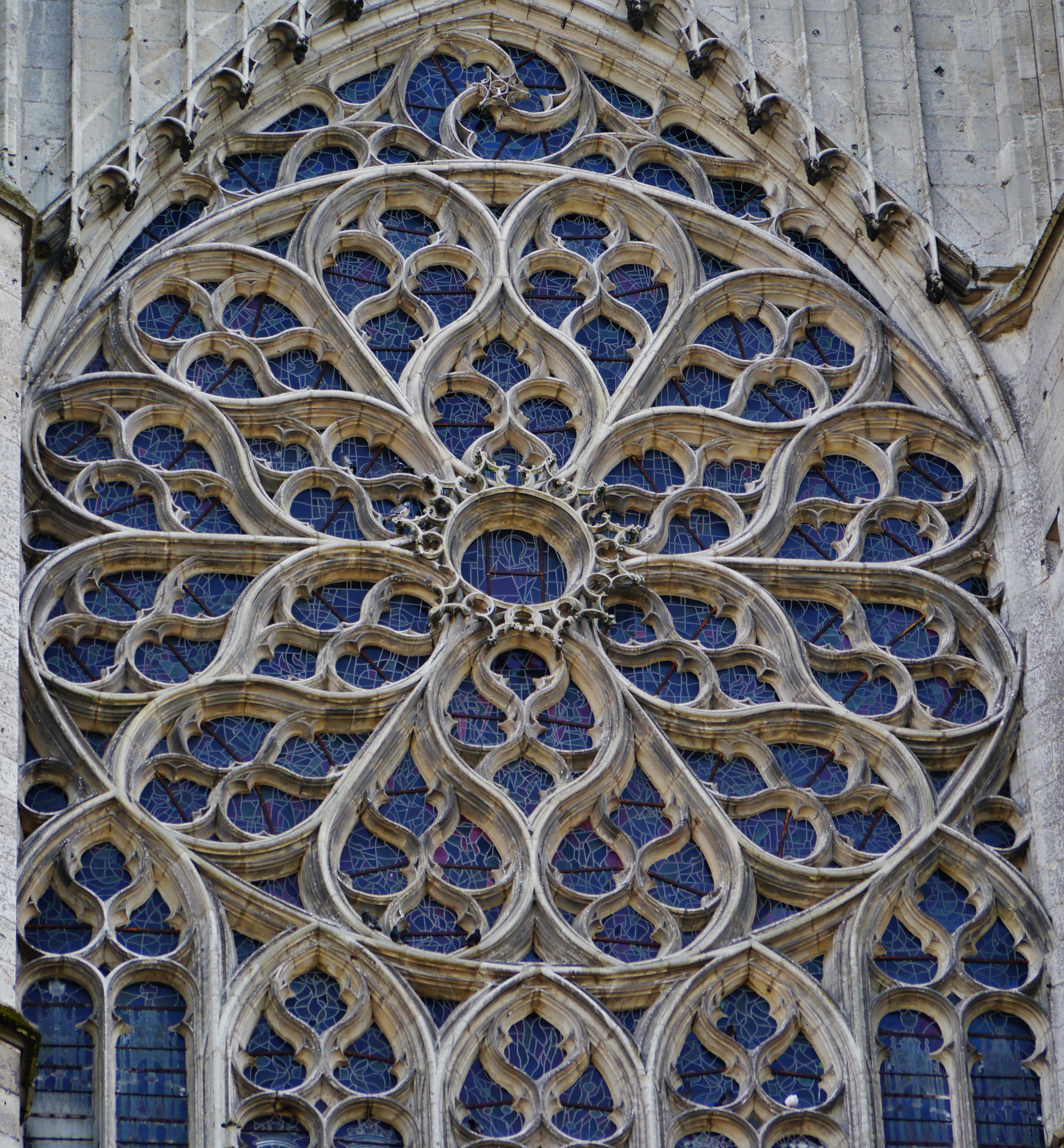
Flamboyant north transept rose of Beauvais Cathedral (16th c.)

== Portal and façade sculpture ==
By long Christian tradition, the altar of cathedrals was at the east end, facing the sunrise, while the main entrance was on the west. Following the Romanesque tradition, the west façade of the Basilica of Saint Denis, built 1137–40, set the style for French Gothic cathedrals; three bays and three doors, each with. carved stone tympanum of sculpture within the arch over the lintel above the door. The voussoirs, the wedge-shaped alongside the arches, were also filled with figures. Unfortunately, one original doorway was destroyed, and the sculptures on the remaining two are mostly 19th-century re-creations.

The three portals of Notre Dame de Paris, altogether forty meters wide, are among the finest examples of High Gothic The sculptural decoration of the central door is devoted to the Last Judgement, on the left to Virgin Mary, for whom the cathedral is named, and on the right to Saint Anne. The Voussures are crowded with small sculptures of angels and saints. In addition, there are ranks of sculpture representing the occupations of the months, and the virtues and the vices, and above the portals are additional galleries representing the Kings of France and scenes of the life of the Virgin Mary.

In the 13th century, the façade sculpture became more natural and expressive, as in the famous smiling angel on the north portal of the west façade of Reims Cathedral. The drapery of the figures and the sculpted plants and flowers were carved with realism and attention to detail.

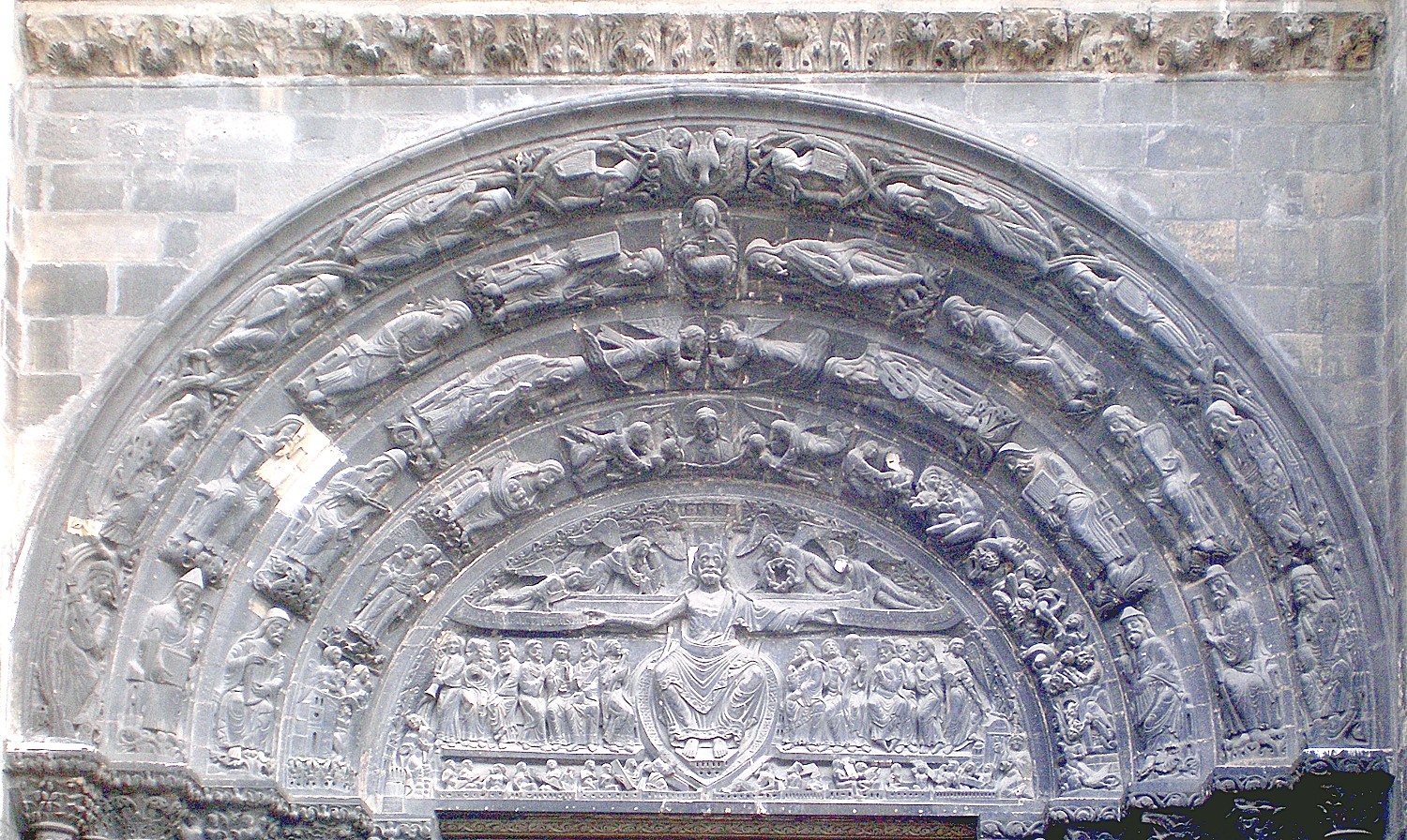
Tympanum of the central portal of the Basilica of Saint Denis (1137–1140)

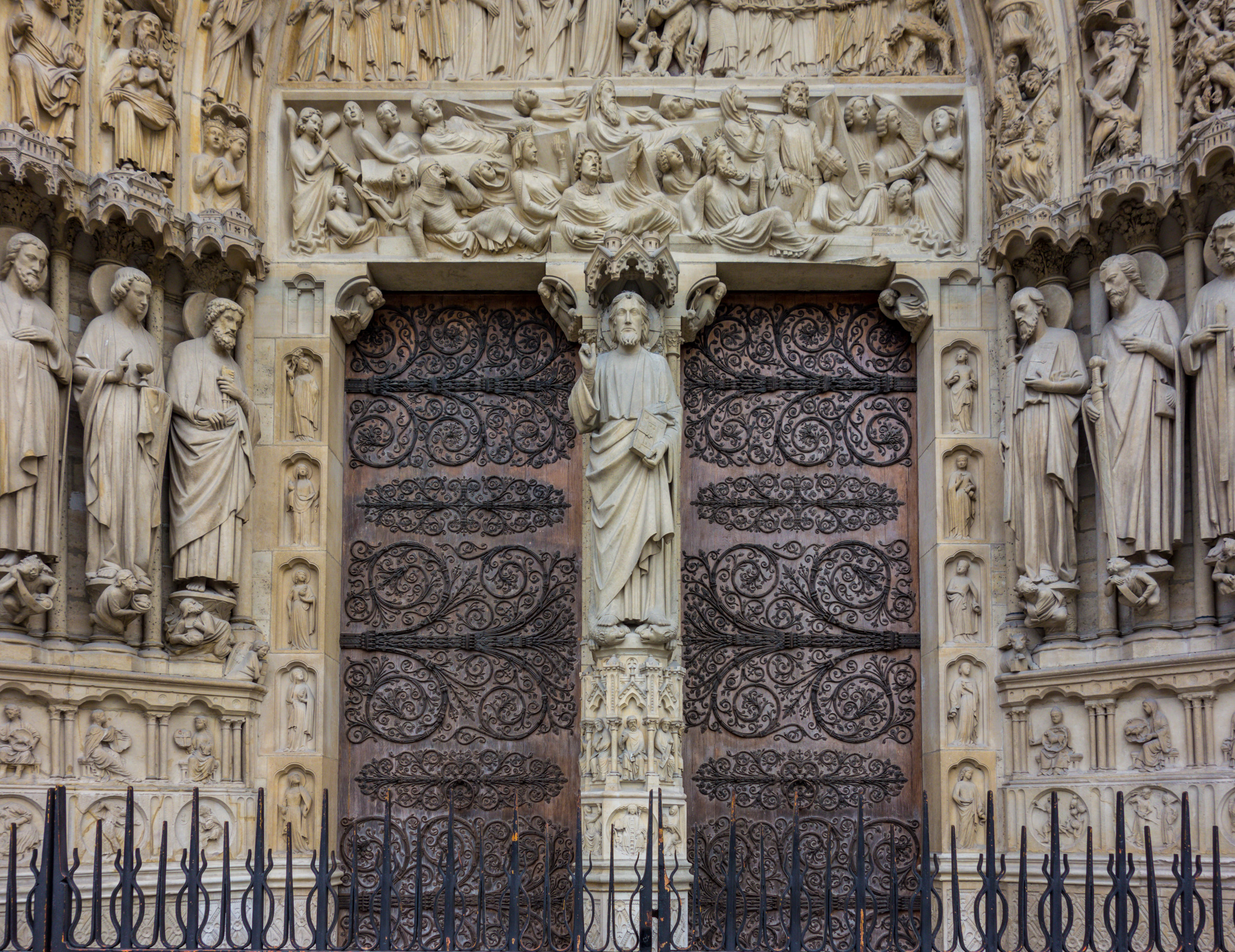
Detail of sculpture in the central portal of Notre Dame de Paris (13th century)

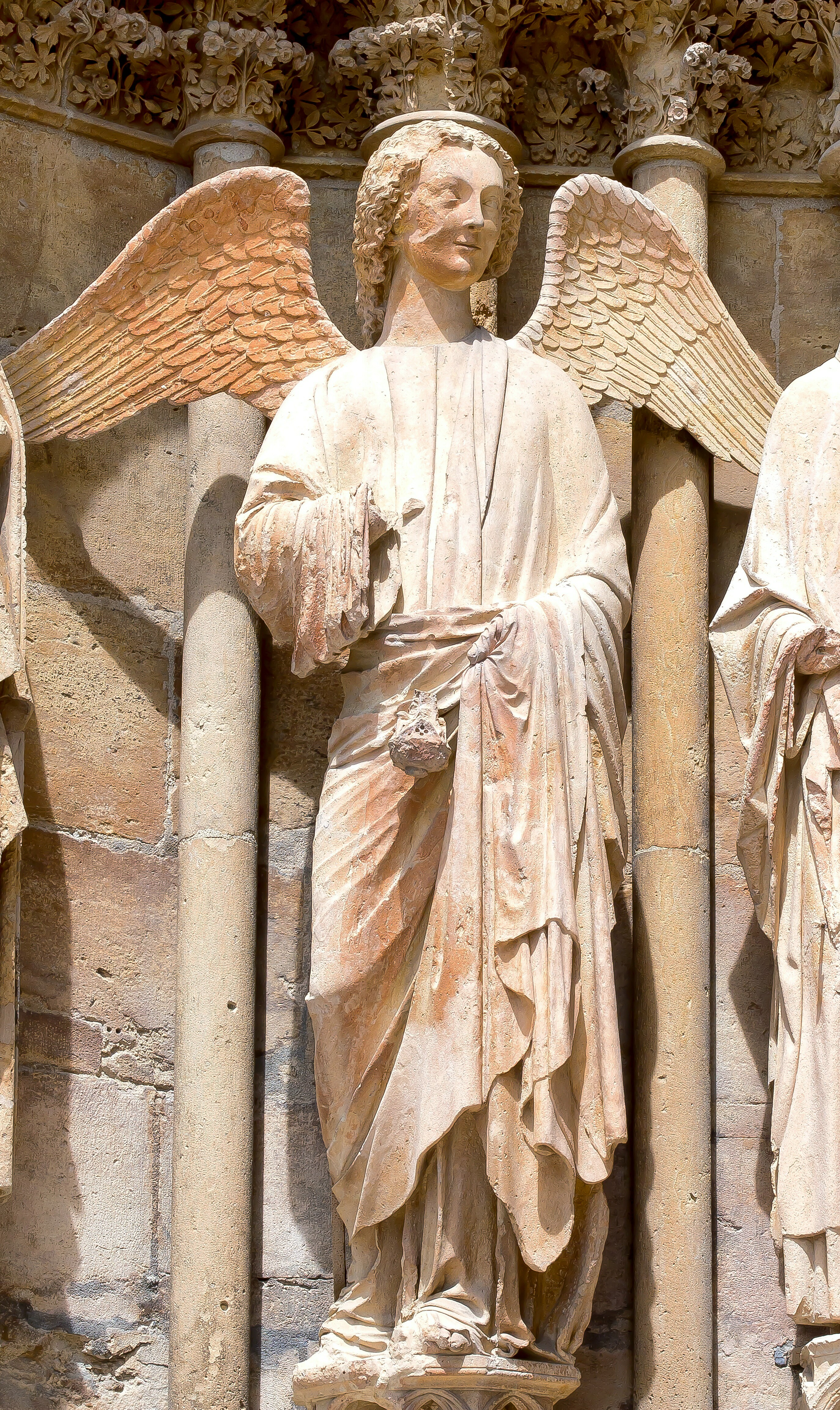
The High Gothic - Smiling Angel, north portal of west façade of Reims Cathedral, by the St. Joseph Master. (1240)

In England, the sculpture was not confined to the portals, but was placed all across the façade, as on the gable of Wells Cathedral. Realistic sculpture also appeared in the 13th century on the west front of Strasbourg, begun in 1272, and in the German states, such as at Naumburg Cathedral (now a Protestant church) (1250). These were in a delicate style called Muldenstil.

In Italy, the finest period for Cathedral sculpture was between 1250 and 1350, in the work of Nicola Pisano at the Pisa Baptistry (1259–60), and Siena Cathedral (1265–68), and in the work of his son, Giovanni Pisano, on the façade of Siena Cathedral. Andrea Pisano (not related to Nicola and Giovanni) was celebrated for his bronze doors of the Baptistery of Florence Cathedral. The work of the Pisanos carried Italian sculpture from the Gothic age to the Roman models of the Renaissance.

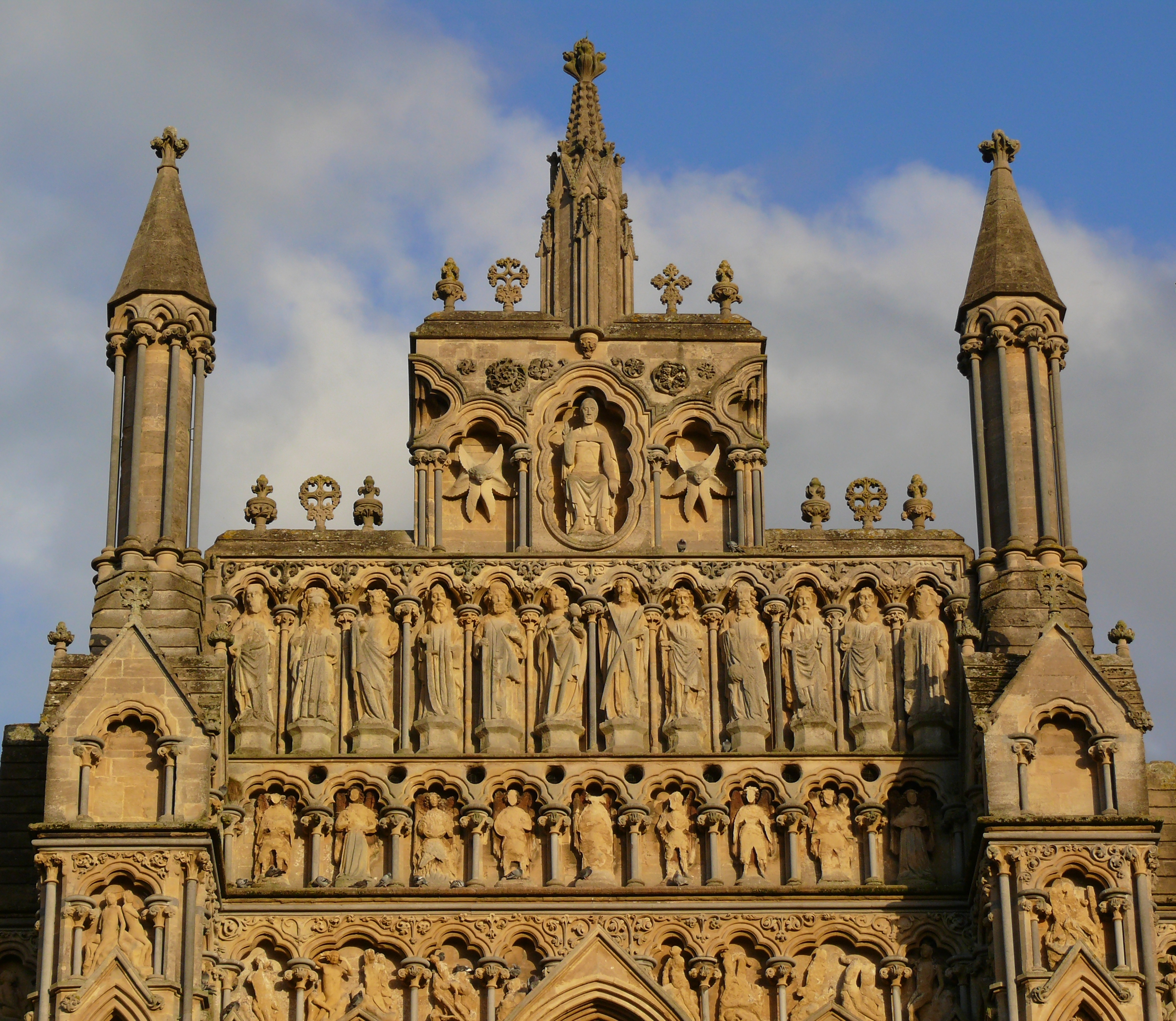
The gable of Wells Cathedral, with Christ the Judge (modern replacement) above the twelve apostles and the nine archangels. (14th century)

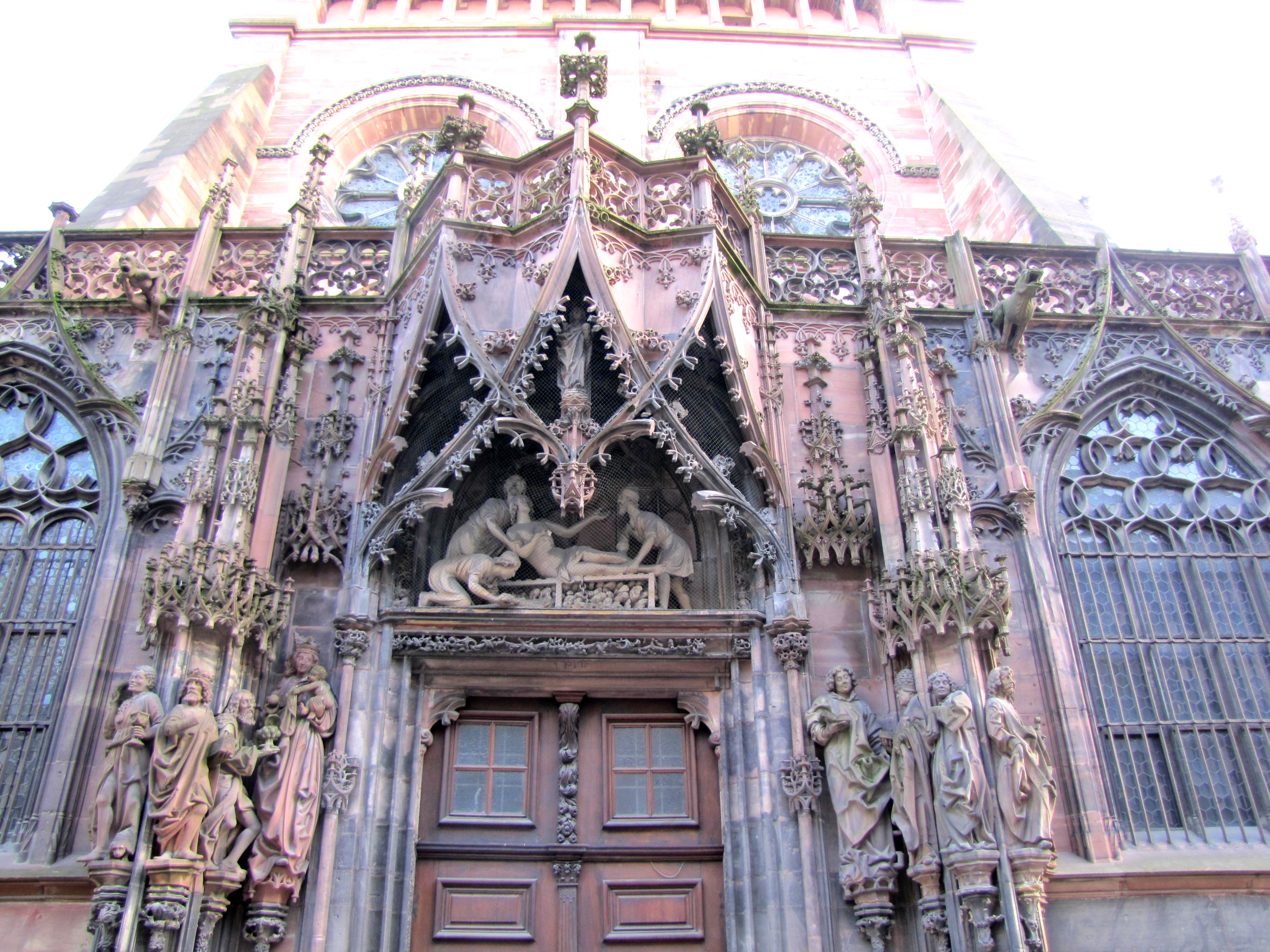
Sculpture over portal of Strasbourg Cathedral (15th–16th centuries)

== Painting and color ==
During the Middle Ages, many of the Gothic cathedrals and churches were brightly painted, both inside and out. Traces of the paint have been found on the walls and sculpture. A few cathedrals, like Albi Cathedral in the south of France, still have some of their original color, and others, notably Chartres Cathedral and the Abbey of Saint-Germain-des-Prés in Paris, have been restoring or recreating the earlier designs, or, in the case of Chartres, cleaning the walls and painting them white. This practice has been criticized by some, who prefer the walls covered with centuries of soot.

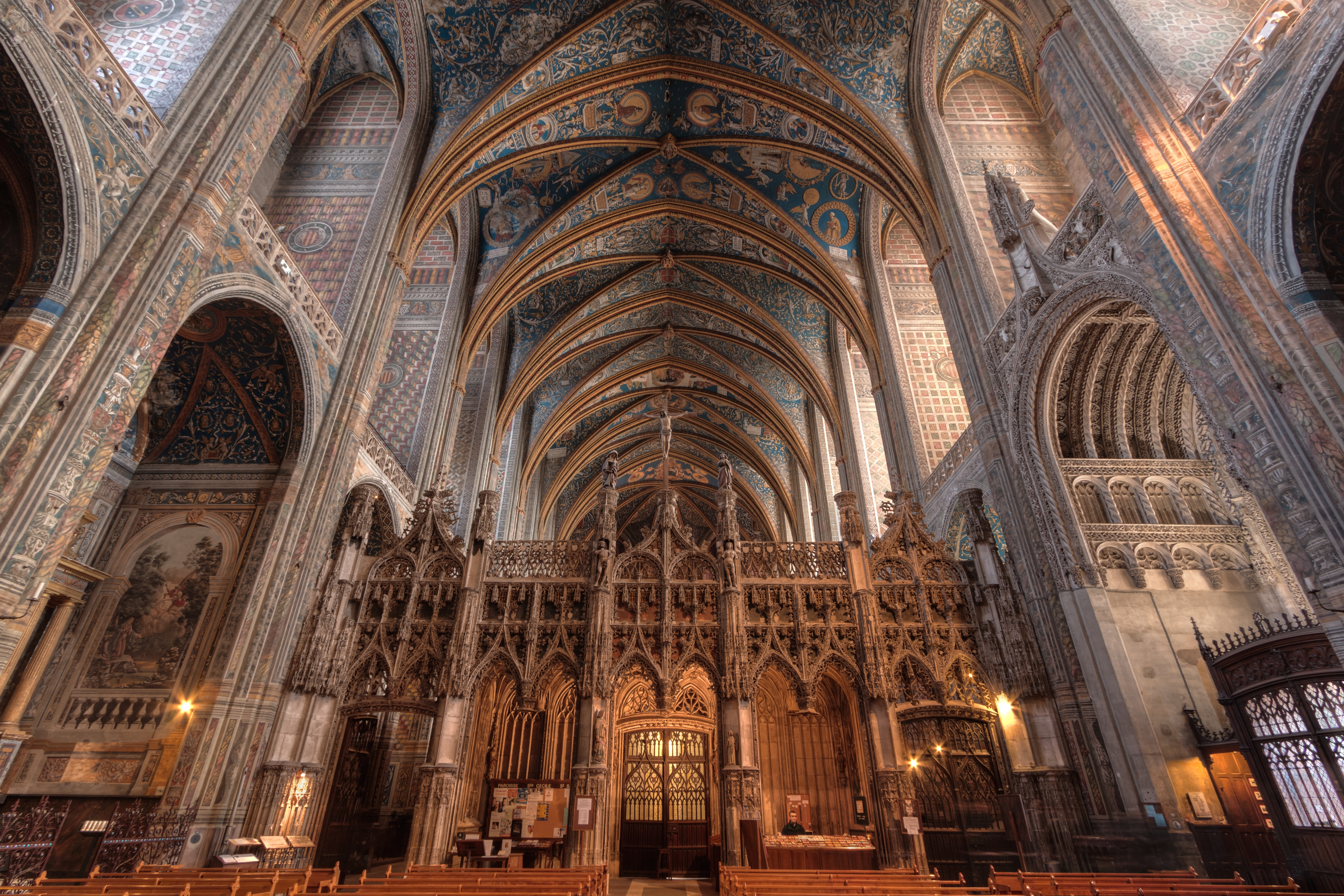
Nave of Albi Cathedral

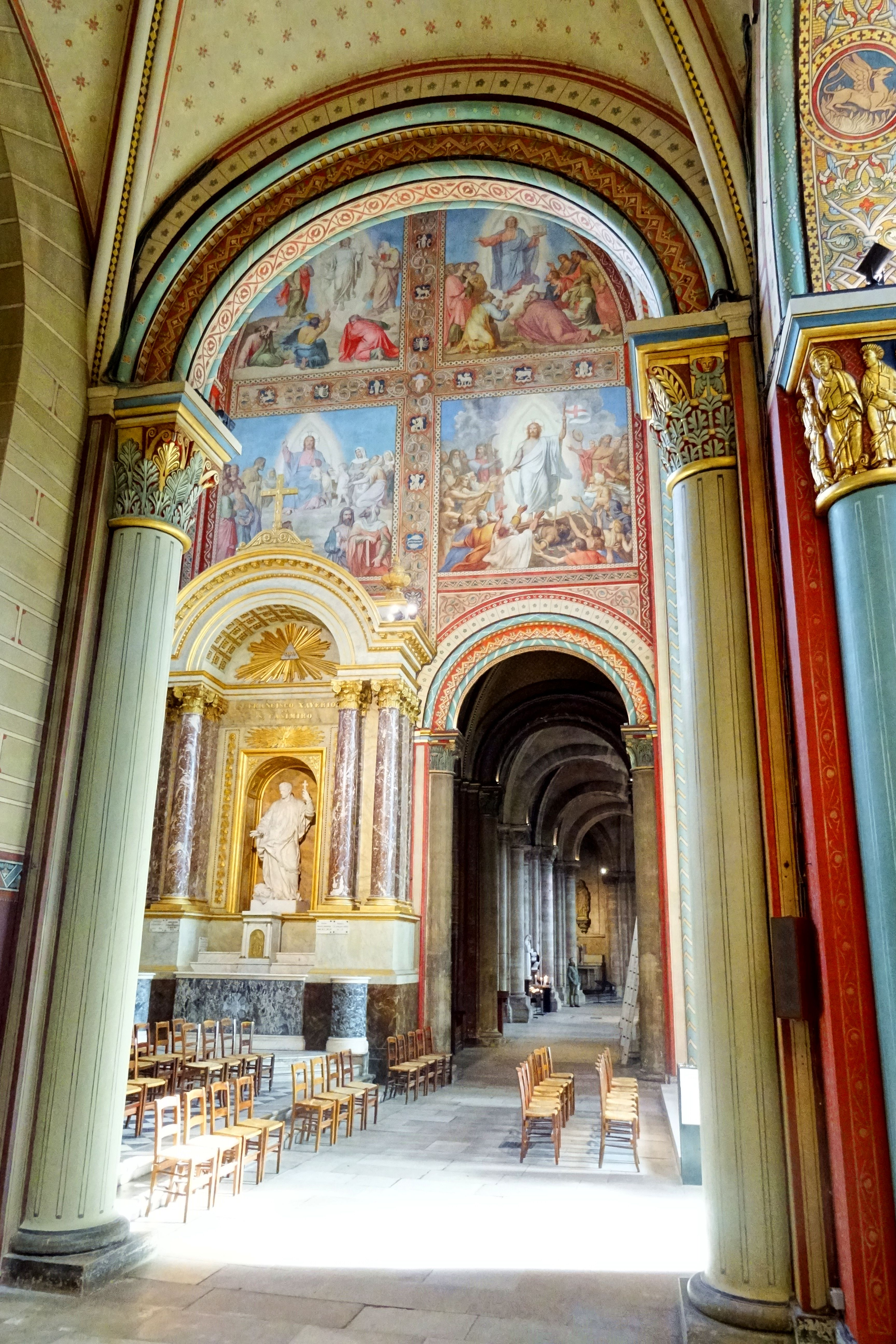
Abbey of Abbey of Saint-Germain-des-Prés with colored decoration (since 2012)

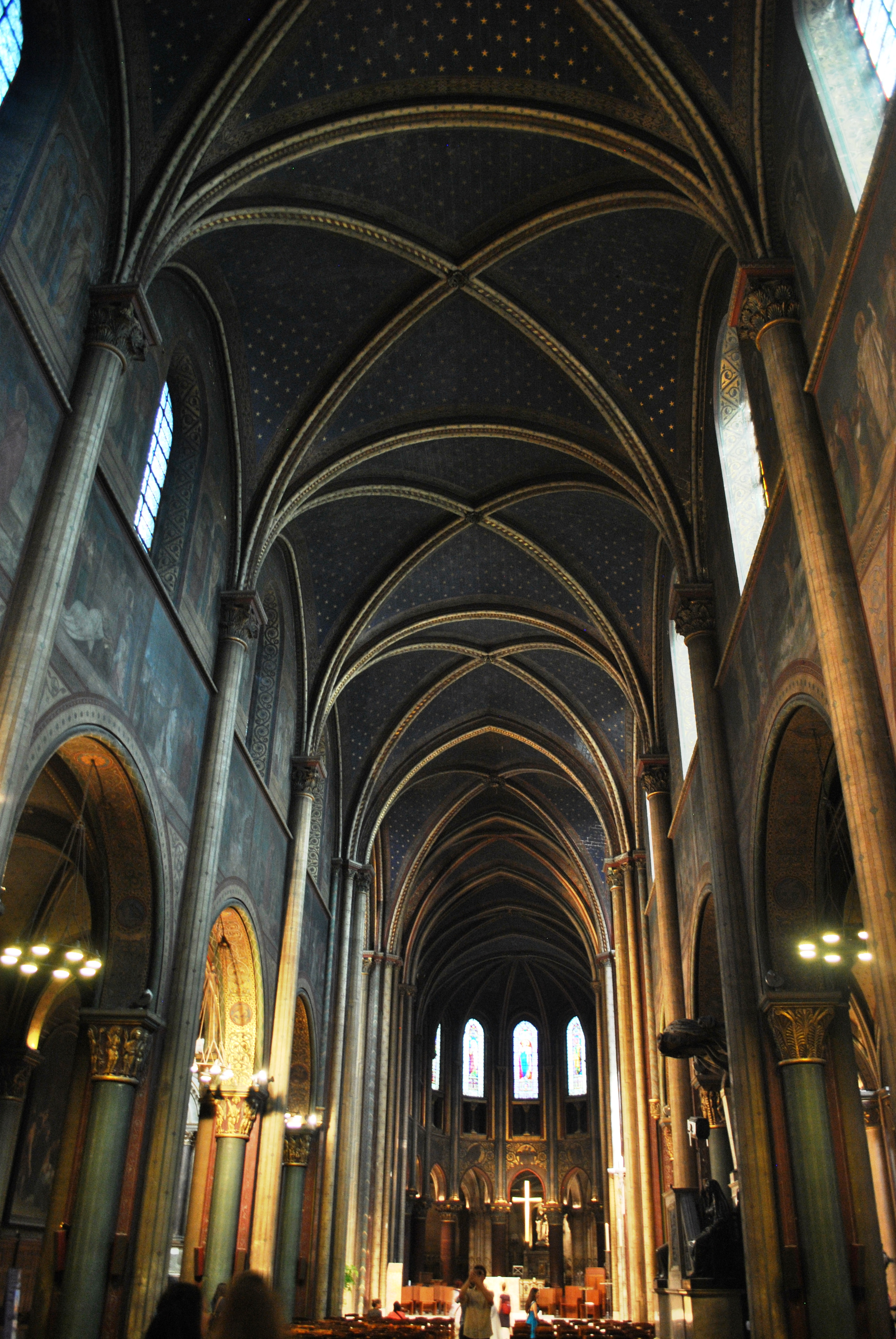
Abbey of Abbey of Saint-Germain-des-Prés with colored decoration (since 2012)

== Bells and bell towers ==
Church bells were introduced into Christian religious ceremonies by Paulinus of Nola in 400 AD, and were formally approved by Pope Sabinian in 604 AD. In Romanesque cathedrals and churches, the bells were often placed in a campanile, a tower separate from the cathedral itself, as in the Leaning Tower of Pisa. The Pisa Tower was begun in 1173, but, because of its problems with sinking and tilting, was not finished until 1372, with the belfry in Gothic style. It had seven bells, one for each note on the scale.

Notre Dame de Paris was particularly known for its bells. They were rung to call members of the parish to church services, to mark the hours and the Angelus ceremony, and for special occasions, such as important funerals and weddings, or to celebrate special events, such as the military victories or the end of wars, or whenever the royal family attended mass at the cathedral. Notre Dame has ten bells, eight in the south tower and two, the largest, in the north tower. The principal bell, or bourdon, called Emmanuel, was installed in the north tower in the 15th century and is still in place. It rings the note F-sharp. It originally required the strength of eleven men, pulling on ropes from a chamber below, to ring that single bell. The clapper of the bell alone weighs one hundred ten kilos. The four other early bells were melted down during the French Revolution. The bells could be swung to make them rhyme, called tolling, or struck, called chiming. The ringing was so loud that the bell-ringers were deafened for several hours afterwards. The manual bell-pullers were replaced by foot pedals in the 19th century, and by an electric system in the 20th century that strikes the bells without swinging them.

Winchester Cathedral in England has had its bells since the Saxon era. King Cnut is known to have donated two bells to the Old Minster church there in 1035. In 1632 there were seven bells in place. Today there are sixteen, the oldest dating to 1621. Besides the daily services, funerals and other and special events, they traditionally were rung to announce the executions, a practice which continued until the death penalty was abolished in England 1965.

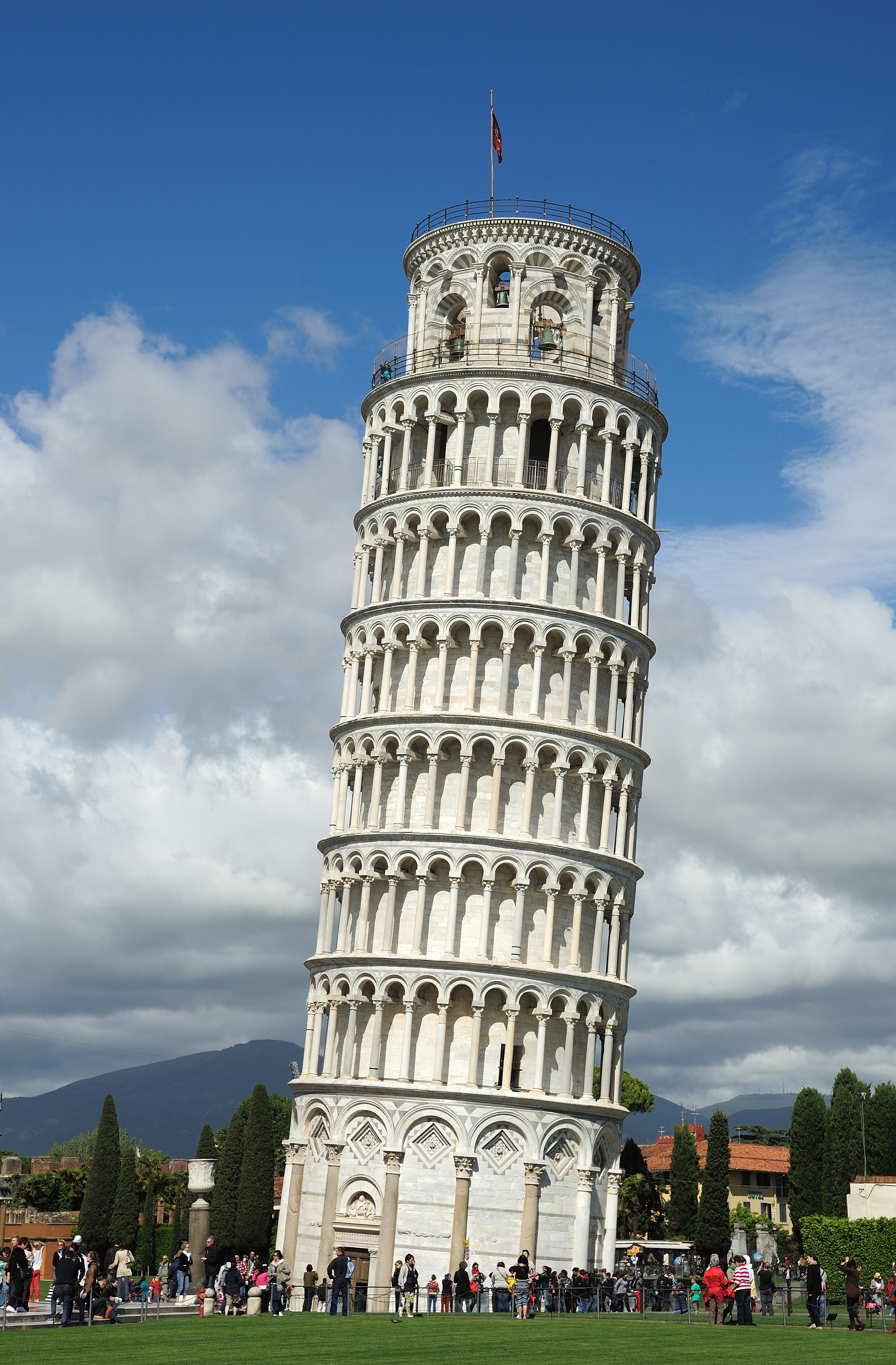
The Leaning Tower of Pisa, with its romanesque tower and Gothic belfry

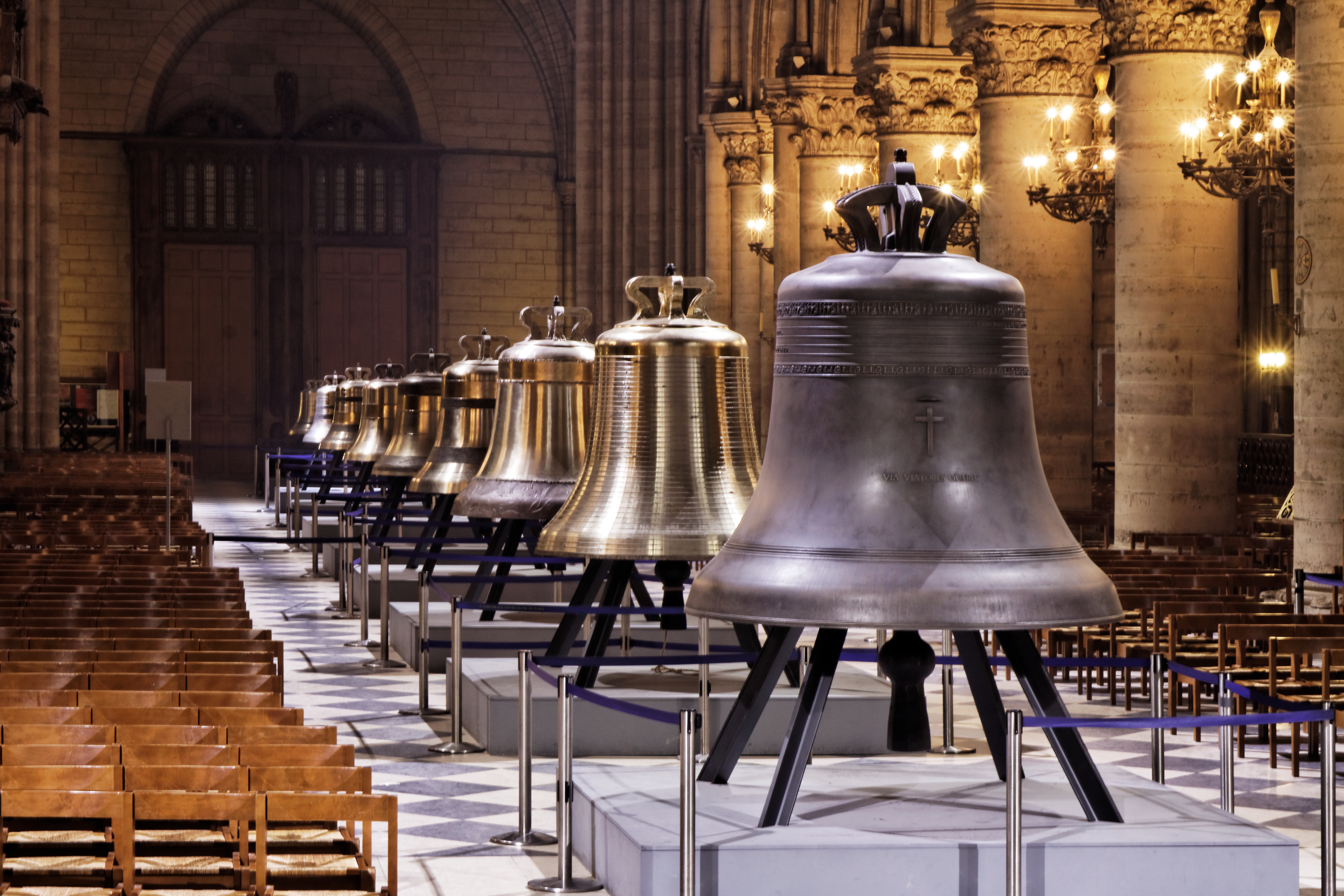
Nine newly-cast bells of Notre-Dame-de-Paris on display in the nave in 2013.

== Oldest, largest, tallest Gothic cathedrals ==
- Oldest. The first Gothic church structure was the ambulatory and choir of the Basilica of Saint Denis in Paris.
- Sens Cathedral, begun in 1130, was the first complete Gothic cathedral in France.
- Largest. Seville Cathedral has more than 500,000 cubic meters of interior space, and Milan Cathedral has 440,000 cubic meters of interior space, making them the largest cathedrals by interior space in Europe. Cologne Cathedral, 144 m (472 ft) long, and 86.25 m (283 ft) high, with 407,000 cubic meters of interior space, ranks as the largest Gothic cathedral in Northern Europe.
- Tallest spires. Cologne Cathedral has the tallest Gothic spires in Europe, 157.4 m (516 ft) high.
- Highest nave. The Beauvais Cathedral choir is 48 m (157 ft) high, though only one portion was completed. It is slightly higher than the nave of St. Peter's Basilica in Rome.

== See also ==
- Architecture of cathedrals and great churches
- Architecture of the medieval cathedrals of England
- Building a Gothic cathedral
- Early Gothic architecture
- English Gothic architecture
- French Gothic architecture
- Influences upon Gothic architecture
- List of Gothic Cathedrals in Europe

== Bibliography ==
=== In English ===
- Martindale, Andrew, Gothic Art, (1967), Thames and Hudson (in English and French); ISBN 2-87811-058-7ad
- O'Reilly, Elizabeth Boyle (1921). How France Built Her Cathedrals – A study in the Twelfth and Thirteenth Centuries. Harper and Brothers.
- Smith, A. Freeman, English Church Architecture of the Middle Ages – an Elementary Handbook (1922), T. Fisher Unwin, Ltd., London (1922) (Full text available on Project Gutenberg)

=== In French ===
- Ducher, Robert, Caractéristique des Styles, (1988), Flammarion, Paris (in French); ISBN 2-08-011539-1
- Martindale, Andrew, Gothic Art, (1967), Thames and Hudson (in English and French); ISBN 2-87811-058-7
- Mignon, Olivier (2015). Architecture des Cathédrales Gothiques (in French). Éditions Ouest-France. ISBN 978-2-7373-6535-5.
- Mignon, Olivier (2017). Architecture du Patrimoine Française - Abbayes, Églises, Cathédrales et Châteaux (in French). Éditions Ouest-France. ISBN 978-27373-7611-5.
- Renault, Christophe; Lazé, Christophe (2006). Les Styles de l'architecture et du mobilier (in French). Gisserot. ISBN 9-782877-474658.
- Rivière, Rémi; Lavoye, Agnès (2007). La Tour Jean sans Peur, Association des Amis de la tour Jean sans Peur. ISBN 978-2-95164-940-8
- Texier, Simon, (2012), Paris Panorama de l'architecture de l'Antiquité à nos jours, Parigramme, Paris (in French), ISBN 978-2-84096-667-8
- Tritagnac, André and Coloni, Marie-Jeanne, Decouvrir Notre-Dame de Paris, Les Éditions de Cerf, Paris (1984), ISBN 2-204-02087-7
- Wenzler, Claude (2018), Cathédrales Cothiques – un Défi Médiéval, Éditions Ouest-France, Rennes (in French) ISBN 978-2-7373-7712-9
- Le Guide du Patrimoine en France (in French). Éditions du Patrimoine, Centre des Monuments Nationaux. 2002. ISBN 978-2-85822-760-0.
