= Jeanne d'Arc (disambiguation) =

Jeanne d'Arc or Joan of Arc (1412–1431) was a French soldier and religious leader, also called La Pucelle (The Maid)

Jeanne d'Arc may also refer to:

== Football clubs ==
- Jeanne d'Arc Poiré, France
- Jeanne d'Arc FC, Mali
- SS Jeanne d'Arc, Réunion
- ASC Jeanne d'Arc, Senegal

== Basketball clubs ==
- Jeanne d'Arc (basketball), Senegal

== Music ==
- Jeanne d'Arc (Braunfels opera)
- "Jeanne d'Arc au bûcher", a 1938 Honegger oratorio
- Jeanne d'Arc (Thy Majestie album), 2005
- Jeanne d'Arc (Tangerine Dream album), 2005

== Places ==
- Sainte-Jeanne-d'Arc, Quebec, Canada
- Sainte-Jeanne-d'Arc-de-la-Mitis, Quebec, Canada
- Sainte Jeanne d'Arc Church (Nice), France
- Péninsule Jeanne d'Arc, Kerguelen Islands
- Port Jeanne d'Arc, Kerguelen Islands

== Ships ==
- French corvette Jeanne d'Arc, a wooden-hulled armored corvette built for the French Navy in the late 1860s
- French cruiser Jeanne d'Arc (1899), an armoured cruiser of the French Navy
- French cruiser Jeanne d'Arc (1930), a school cruiser of the French Navy
- French cruiser Jeanne d'Arc (R97), a 1961 helicopter cruiser

== Other uses ==
- Jeanne d'Arc (video game), a 2006 tactical role-playing game
- Jeanne d’Arc School, a defunct school in Tehran, Iran
- Jeanne d'Arc station, an OC Transpo station in Canada
- Rue Jeanne d'Arc, a street in Beirut, Lebanon

== See also ==
- Arc (disambiguation)
- French ship Jeanne d'Arc, a list of ships of the French navy
- Janne Da Arc, a Japanese band
- Jeanne (disambiguation)
- Joan (disambiguation)
- Joan of Arc (disambiguation)
- La Pucelle (disambiguation)
- Sainte-Jeanne-d'Arc (disambiguation)
- Saint Joan of Arc (disambiguation)
- Saint Joan (disambiguation)
- The Maid (disambiguation)
