= Saint Joan of Arc (disambiguation) =

Saint Joan of Arc (French: Sainte Jehanne d'Arc; French: La Pucelle, lit. 'The Maid') is the patron saint of France.

Saint Joan of Arc may also refer to:

- Saint Joan of Arc Church (disambiguation), several churches
- St. Joan of Arc School (disambiguation), several schools
- Saint Joan of Arc (book), a biography by Vita Sackville-West
- Order of St. Joan D'Arc Medallion, for volunteerism, of the United States Armor Association
- Feminine Brigades of St. Joan of Arc, a military order in Zapopan, Jalisco, Mexico

== See also ==
- Sainte-Jeanne-d'Arc (disambiguation) (French: Saint Joan of Arc)
- Jeanne d'Arc (disambiguation) (French: Joan of Arc)
- Joan of Arc (disambiguation)
- La Pucelle (disambiguation)
- The Maid (disambiguation)
- Saint Joan (disambiguation)
- Joan (disambiguation)
- Arc (disambiguation)
