= Sainte-Jeanne-d'Arc =

Sainte-Jeanne-d'Arc, Ste-Jeanne-d'Arc, or variation, may refer to:

People

- Joan of Arc, who is known as Sainte Jehanne d'Arc (Ste. Jeanne d'Arc) in her native French, and called La Pucelle ("The Maid")

Places

- Sainte-Jeanne-d'Arc-de-la-Mitis, Quebec, a municipality in Quebec
- Sainte-Jeanne-d'Arc, Quebec, a village in Quebec

Churches

- Basilica of Sainte-Jeanne-d'Arc (Paris)
- Sainte Jeanne d'Arc Church (Besançon)
- Sainte Jeanne d'Arc Church (Nice)

== See also ==
- Joan of Arc (disambiguation)
- Jeanne d'Arc (disambiguation)
- Saint Joan of Arc (disambiguation)
- La Pucelle (disambiguation)
- The Maid (disambiguation)
- Jeanne (disambiguation)
- Arc (disambiguation)
