= Joan of Arc (disambiguation) =

Joan of Arc (1412–1431; French: Jehanne d'Arc) was a French woman who is known for her role in the Hundred Years' War and as a religious figure, also called The Maid ("La Pucelle")

Joan of Arc may also refer to:

== Film and television ==
- Joan of Arc (1900 film)
- The Passion of Joan of Arc (1928 film)
- Joan of Arc (1935 film)
- Joan of Arc (1948 film)
- The Messenger: The Story of Joan of Arc (1999 film)
- Joan of Arc (miniseries) (1999 television miniseries)
- Joan of Arc (2019 film)

== Music ==
- Joan of Arc (band), an American indie band
- Joan of Arc (album), by Tony Conrad, 2006
- "Joan of Arc" (Henry Burr song), 1917
- "Joan of Arc" (Leonard Cohen song), 1971
- "Joan of Arc" (Little Mix song), 2018
- "Joan of Arc" (Madonna song), 2015
- "Joan of Arc" (Orchestral Manoeuvres in the Dark song), 1981
- "Joan of Arc", a song by Arcade Fire from Reflektor, 2013
- "Joan of Arc", a song by In This Moment from Ritual, 2017
- "Joan of Arc", a song by the Melvins from Houdini, 1993

== Other uses ==
- Joan of Arc (horse) (foaled 2018), an Irish Thoroughbred racehorse
- Joan of Arc (painting), an 1879 painting by Jules Bastien-Lepage
- Joan of Arc (poem), a 1796 epic poem by Robert Southey
- Joan of Arc: The Image of Female Heroism, a 1981 book by Marina Warner
- Joan of Arc: Siege & the Sword, a 1989 video game

== See also ==
- Equestrian statue of Joan of Arc (disambiguation)
- Cultural depictions of Joan of Arc
- Jeanne d'Arc (disambiguation) (French: Joan of Arc)
- Order of St. Joan D'Arc Medallion, a U.S. Army award
- Sainte-Jeanne-d'Arc (disambiguation)
- Saint Joan of Arc (disambiguation)
- The Maid of Orleans (disambiguation)
- Joan of Arcadia, a 2003–2005 American TV series
- Joan Van Ark (born 1943), American actress
- Saint Joan (disambiguation)
- Jeanne (disambiguation)
- Joan (disambiguation)
- Arc (disambiguation)
