= Maiden (disambiguation) =

A maiden is a male or female virgin. In obsolete and literary contexts, it may refer to any girl or unmarried woman.

Maiden or Maidens may also refer to:

== Meaning "first" ==
- Maiden flight, the first flight by an aircraft
- Maiden name, a married woman's birth surname
- Maiden over, in cricket, with no runs scored
- Maiden race, the first race for a horse
- Maiden race horse, a horse that has not won a race
- Maiden speech, a politician's first speech in a legislature

== Arts, entertainment, and media ==
- Iron Maiden, a British heavy metal band, often shortened to "Maiden"
- Maiden, the first of the three aspects of the Triple Goddess (Neopaganism)
- Maiden, the author abbreviation for Joseph Maiden
- MaiDen, the alternative name of the fictional supercouple AlDub on a Philippine TV show
- Maiden (film), a documentary film by Alex Holmes
- The Maiden (film), 2022 Canadian drama film
- Maiden, a survival horror short video game made as a demo for Resident Evil Village
- The Maiden (short story), a short story by Jean Stafford
- The Maiden (Klimt), a 1913 painting by Gustav Klimt

== People with the surname ==
- David Maiden, Scottish rugby league player
- Gregor Maiden (born 1979), Scottish cricketer
- Jennifer Maiden (born 1949), Australian poet and novelist
- Joe Maiden, author and BBC Radio presenter
- Joseph Maiden (1859–1925), English/Australian botanist
- Michael Maidens (1987–2007), English footballer
- Sidney Maiden (1917–c.1987), American country blues musician
- Willie Maiden (1928–1976), American jazz saxophonist and arranger

== Places ==
=== Japan ===
- Mai-den Hall, Kumano Taisha, Matsue, Shimane, Japan

=== United Kingdom ===
- Maiden Bradley, Wiltshire
- Maiden Island, Oban Bay, Scotland
- Maiden Law, Durham, England
- Maiden Moor, in the Lake District of England
- Maiden Newton, Dorset
- Maiden Stack, Shetland
- Maiden Stone, Pictish standing stone near Inverurie, Scotland
- Maiden Wells, Pembrokeshire
- Maidens, South Ayrshire, Scotland
- Maiden's Green, Berkshire
- Maidenhead, Berkshire
- The Maidens, Northern Ireland
  - The Maidens lighthouses

=== United States ===
- Maiden, North Carolina, in Catawba County
- Maiden Creek, a tributary of the Schuylkill River, Pennsylvania
- Maiden Rock, Wisconsin
- Maidens, Virginia

== Other uses ==
- Maiden (guillotine), a device used for executions
- Maiden (yacht), an ocean racing yacht
- Maiden City F.C., a football club from Northern Ireland, UK
- Maiden Holdings, a Bermuda insurance holding company
- Maiden rocksnail (Leptoxis formosa), an extinct freshwater snail species

== See also ==
- Maiden Castle (disambiguation)
- Maiden Lane (disambiguation)
- Maiden's hair (disambiguation)
- Iron maiden (disambiguation)
- Nine Maidens (disambiguation)
- Maidenhead (disambiguation)
- Maidan (disambiguation)
- Maid (disambiguation)
- Virgin (disambiguation)
