= Saint Joan of Arc Church =

Saint Joan of Arc Church or Sainte Jeanne d'Arc Church or variants may refer to:

- St. Joan of Arc Chapel, Milwaukee, Wisconsin, US
- St. Joan of Arc's Church (Bronx, New York), US
- St Joan of Arc's Church, Farnham, Surrey, England, UK
- Church of St Joan of Arc, Rouen, France
- Basilica of Sainte-Jeanne-d'Arc (Paris), France
- Sainte Jeanne d'Arc Church (Besançon), France
- Sainte Jeanne d'Arc Church (Nice), France
