= Maid (disambiguation) =

A maid is a woman employed in domestic service.

Maid, MAID or Maids may also refer to:

- Maid (title), a title granted to the eldest daughter of a Scottish Laird
- Maiden, a virginal woman
- Maids (film), directed by Fernando Meirelles and Nando Olival
- Maids (2015 TV series), a 2015 South Korean costume drama
- Maids (comics), a 2020 graphic novel by Katie Skelly
- Maid (miniseries), a 2021 American miniseries
- Massive array of idle disks, a data storage system
- Medical assistance in dying, the involvement of healthcare professionals in the provision of lethal drugs intended to end a patient’s life
- MAiD, Euthanasia in Canada
- Mobile advertising ID, a device or operating environment identity for advertising services

== See also ==
- Maid café
- The Maid (disambiguation), including "The Maids"
- The Chambermaid (disambiguation)
- The Housemaid (disambiguation)
- Maiden (disambiguation)
- Virgin (disambiguation)
