= Vivien Merchant =

English actress (1929–1982)

- Portrait of Vivien Merchant by Cecil Beaton
- Born: Ada Thomson; 22 July 1929; Manchester, Lancashire, England
- Died: 3 October 1982 (aged 53); London, England
- Spouse: Harold Pinter (m. 1956; div. 1980)
- Children: 1

Ada Brand Thomson (22 July 1929 – 3 October 1982), known professionally as Vivien Merchant, was an English actress. She began her career in 1942, and became known for dramatic roles on stage and in films. In 1956 she married the playwright Harold Pinter and performed in many of his plays.

Merchant achieved considerable success from the 1950s to the 1970s, winning the BAFTA TV Award for Best Actress in 1964. For her role in the film Alfie (1966), she received an Academy Award nomination for Best Supporting Actress, and won the BAFTA Award for Most Promising Newcomer. In 1967, she starred in the Broadway production of Pinter's The Homecoming, and received a Tony Award nomination. Her other films included Accident (1967), The Offence (1972), Frenzy (1972), The Homecoming (1973), and The Maids (1975). Suffering from depression and alcoholism as her marriage ended, she died in 1982, two years after her divorce.

== Career ==
Merchant took her stage name as a composite of the actress Vivien Leigh and her brother, who was a merchant seaman (cited by Michael Billington). She began acting professionally in 1942, with supporting juvenile roles in repertory, progressing to West End roles in such works as Noël Coward's Sigh No More and Ace of Clubs, becoming an established lead in repertory in the early 1950s. Merchant subsequently performed in many stage productions and several films, including Alfie (1966), Accident (1967), Frenzy (1972), and The Offence (also 1972). Her performance in Alfie gained her Academy Award and Golden Globe nominations for Best Supporting Actress, and won her the BAFTA Award for Most Promising Newcomer and the National Board of Review Award for Best Supporting Actress.

After Merchant married the playwright Harold Pinter in 1956, she appeared in many of his plays, including the 1960 revival of his first play, The Room at the Hampstead Theatre, A Slight Ache, A Night Out, The Collection, and The Lover; the latter was also a celebrated television production partnering Alan Badel at Associated Rediffusion, for which she was given an Evening Standard Theatre Award for Best Newcomer and the BAFTA Award for Best Actress, both in 1963.

Merchant subsequently appeared as Wendy in Tea Party opposite Leo McKern in 1965. Merchant starred as Ruth in The Homecoming (1964) on stage both in London in 1965 and New York in 1967, receiving a Tony Award nomination for Best Actress in a Play. She went on to star in the film version in 1973. The last of his plays in a role premiere on stage was Old Times (1971) as Anna. Merchant played Lady Macbeth to Paul Scofield's Macbeth for the Royal Shakespeare Company in 1967, directed by Sir Peter Hall.

Merchant took the role of Madame in the Greenwich Theatre revival of Jean Genet's The Maids partnering Glenda Jackson and Susannah York: This was filmed in 1974 by Christopher Miles. In 1975, Merchant and Timothy Dalton headed the cast of a revival of Coward's The Vortex at the Greenwich Theatre.

== Personal life ==
Merchant was the first wife of Harold Pinter, whom she met while working as a repertory actress; he was then working as an actor under the stage name of David Baron. They married in 1956, and their son, Daniel, was born in 1958.

Their marriage began disintegrating in the mid-1960s. From 1962 to 1969, Pinter had a clandestine affair with Joan Bakewell, which inspired his play Betrayal. In 1975, he began a serious affair with the historian Lady Antonia Fraser, the wife of Sir Hugh Fraser, which he confessed to his wife that March. At first, Merchant took it very well, saying positive things about Fraser, according to her friend artist Guy Vaesen (as cited by Billington); but, Vaesen recalled, after "a female friend of Vivien's trotted round to her house and poisoned her mind against Antonia ... life in Hanover Terrace [where the Pinters then lived] gradually became impossible". Pinter left, and Merchant filed for divorce and gave interviews to the tabloid press, expressing her distress. Merchant made some unflattering comments about Fraser at this time: "He didn't need to take a change of shoes. He can always wear hers. She has very big feet, you know." Merchant believed Fraser to be the basis for the character of Emma in Pinter's play Betrayal, never learning about his prior affair with Joan Bakewell.

The Frasers' divorce became final in 1977, and the Pinters' in 1980. In 1980, Pinter and Fraser married.

=== Death ===
Merchant became deeply depressed after the end of her marriage to Pinter and turned to drinking. She died at the age of 53 on 3 October 1982, from alcoholism.

== Filmography ==
=== Film ===
Year	Title	Role	Notes
1966	Alfie	Lily Clamacraft	BAFTA Award for Most Promising Newcomer to Leading Film Roles; National Board of Review Award for Best Supporting Actress; Nominated—Academy Award for Best Supporting Actress; Nominated—Golden Globe Award for Best Supporting Actress - Motion Picture
1967	Accident	Rosalind	National Society of Film Critics Award for Best Supporting Actress (runner-up)
1969	Alfred the Great	Freda	
1971	Under Milk Wood	Mrs. Pugh	
1972	Frenzy	Mrs. Oxford	
1972	The Offence	Maureen Johnson	
1973	The Homecoming	Ruth	Nominated—BAFTA Award for Best Actress in a Supporting Role
1975	The Maids	Madame	

=== Television ===
Year	Title	Role	Notes
1948	Virtuoso	Miss Coleman	
1955	Sunday-Night Theatre	Elsa Perkins	Episode: The Fifty Mark
1959	The Infamous John Friend	"Crown Inn" Landlady	Episode: Episode #1.4
1960	Armchair Theatre	Girl	Episode: A Night Out
1960	ITV Television Playhouse	Rose Blatchford; Sally Gibbs	Episode: The Honeymooners episode: Night School
1962	Studio 4	Olivia	Episode: The Weather in the Streets
1963	The Lover	Sarah	
1963	Maupassant	Henriette	Episode: Wives and Lovers
1963	ITV Television Playhouse	Angela Fairbourne	Episode: In Confidence
1965	ITV Play of the Week	Kathy Grayson	Episode: The Fall of the Sparrow
1966	Theatre 625	Natalia Petrovna; Gertrude	Episode: A Month in the Country episode: Focus
1966	Seven Deadly Sins	Jane	Episode: My Friend Corby
1966	Thirty-Minute Theatre	Ella	Episode: Ella
1968	ITV Playhouse	Tessa	Episode: Funeral Games
1968	Play of the Month	Evelyn Daly	Episode: Waters of the Moon
1969	ITV Saturday Night Theatre	Maureen Instance	Episode: The Full Cheddar
1970	ITV Saturday Night Theatre	Augusta Fullam; Audley	Episode: Wicked Women: Augusta Fullam; Episode: Skyscrapers
1971	Aquarius	Anna in Old Times	Episode: 5 June 1971
1971	Play of the Month	Dona Ana	Episode: Don Juan in Hell
1972	A War of Children	Nora Tomelty	TV movie
1973	Play of the Month	Jane Noble	Episode: The Common
1973	Softly, Softly: Task Force	Maggie Jarman	Episode: Cover
1977	The Lover	Sarah	TV movie
1977	The Man in the Iron Mask	Maria Theresa	TV movie
1977	The Velvet Glove	Elizabeth Fry	Episode: Beyond This Life
1977	Secret Army	Mile. Gunet	Episode: Growing Up
1980	Breakaway	Isabel Black	Episode: The Local Affair
1980	A Tale of Two Cities	Miss Pross	(TV miniseries)
1982	Crown Court	Judge	Episode: Face Value: Part 1, (final appearance)

== See also ==
- List of British actors
- List of Academy Award winners and nominees from Great Britain
- List of actors with Academy Award nominations
