= Avalon (2001 film) =

2001 film by Mamoru Oshii

- Polish release poster
- Directed by: Mamoru Oshii
- Screenplay by: Kazunori Itō
- Produced by: Atsushi Kubo
- Starring: Małgorzata Foremniak; Dariusz Biskupski
- Cinematography: Grzegorz Kędzierski
- Edited by: Hiroshi Okuda
- Music by: Kenji Kawai
- Production companies: Deiz Production; Bandai Visual; Media Factory; Dentsu; Nippon Herald Films
- Distributed by: Nippon Herald Films (Japan); Monolith Films (Poland)
- Release dates: 20 January 2001 (Japan); 12 April 2002 (Poland)
- Running time: 106 minutes
- Countries: Japan; Poland
- Language: Polish
- Budget: $8 million
- Box office: $449,275

Avalon (Japanese: アヴァロン, Hepburn: Avaron), also known as Gate to Avalon, is a 2001 Polish-language science fiction drama film directed by Mamoru Oshii and written by Kazunori Itō. An international co-production of Japan and Poland, the film stars Małgorzata Foremniak as Ash, a player in an illegal virtual reality video game whose sense of reality is challenged as she attempts to unravel the true nature and purpose of the game.

Avalon was filmed in Wrocław, Nowa Huta, the Modlin Fortress and Warsaw. The 2009 film Assault Girls, which was written and directed by Oshii, is a stand-alone sequel set in the same fictional universe as Avalon.

== Plot ==
In a near future, many are addicted to Avalon, a virtual reality shooter. In Avalon, solo players or parties raid levels populated with AI-controlled enemies and opposing players. Winners are rewarded with experience points and in-game money, which can be exchanged for cash, allowing skilled players to make a living. As their brains interact with Avalon directly, it places mental strains on players, and sometimes renders them catatonic.

Ash, a famous player, plays solo since her party disbanded. After a Class A mission, the GM (Game Master) warns her of the next level's danger, and suggests that she join a party. The next day, a Bishop-class character breaks Ash's record time on the same mission. Ash tries but fails to learn about him or his avatar. As she leaves the game terminal, the Bishop player watches her.

Ash runs into former teammate Stunner. Murphy, their former leader, went after a hidden NPC in Avalon, a young girl nicknamed "ghost," and became comatose. The girl is allegedly the only gateway into the rumored Special A, a mission where players cannot "reset" (a mechanic allowing people to abort mission without their avatars being killed). Players who went after "ghost" never woke up from the game and became "Unreturned". Ash and Stunner visit Murphy at a hospital, where someone looking similar to "ghost" watches her.

At home, Ash searches for words regarding Avalon, and the ghost. The search leads her to the "Nine Sisters", another Arthurian legend reference. Upon entering Avalon, Ash receives an invitation to a meeting, and is ambushed by griefers. They lured Ash there to rob her equipment. After she overpowers a player, the griefers' leader reveals that only the real Nine Sisters – Avalon's creators – know how to access Special A. They are interrupted by an attack helicopter which kills most of the players. Due to a lag, its missiles teleport in front of Ash. She "resets" and leaves Avalon, saving her avatar. On the return home, people around Ash seem immobile, with the exception of a dog. At home, after preparing a meal for her dog, she realizes that it has disappeared. She hears the helicopter flying past.

The next day, Stunner meets Ash. He relays a rumor that the ghost appears when there's a high-level Bishop present on the battlefield, so Bishop players are sought out by parties seeking to enter Special A. Before becoming an Unreturned, Murphy was a Bishop player. At her house, Ash is visited by the Bishop player. He offers to form a party with her and she accepts. Ash arrives at the game terminal and tells the receptionist that she plans to enter Special A to look for Murphy. Despite warnings from the receptionist and the GM, she enters the game.

There, Ash meets the Bishop player, whom she suspects is working for the Nine Sisters. Stunner arrives, revealing that he was helping Bishop recruit Ash all along. The party confronts the Citadel, a boss. Stunner, Bishop and his summoned dummy players distract the Citadel, while Ash attacks its weak point. After the Citadel is destroyed, Stunner spots the ghost. He is then shot by an enemy. Before being forced out of Avalon, Stunner mentions the only way to kill the ghost. Ash kills the ghost, turning it into a gateway. Ash steps into the gateway and disappears.

Ash "wakes up" from the game booth, which is put in her apartment, wearing civilian clothing and without equipment. Bishop contacts her, saying that she is in Class Real. The only way to exit Avalon is to complete the objective: defeat the Unreturned staying there. Ash takes a provided gun and proceeds to her destination, an Avalon-themed concert by the Warsaw Philharmonic Orchestra. En route, she moves through a bustling world, unlike the previous levels and the real world. At the concert hall, Ash sees Murphy, and they walk outside to talk. As she confronts Murphy about his decision to stay in the game, he states that he prefers the "reality" within Avalon. Ash mortally wounds Murphy, who urges her to stay, then disappears. Ash enters the now empty concert hall, and sees the ghost on the stage. Ash trains her gun on the ghost, who smiles. The words "Welcome to Avalon" appear on screen.

== Cast ==
- Małgorzata Foremniak as Ash
- Władysław Kowalski as Game Master
- Jerzy Gudejko as Murphy
- Dariusz Biskupski as Bishop
- Bartek Świderski as Stunner
- Katarzyna Bargiełowska as Receptionist
- Alicja Sapryk as Jill
- Michał Breitenwald as Murphy of Nine Sisters
- Zuzanna Kasz as Ghost
- Jarosław Budnik as Cooper (voiceover)
- Andrzej Dębski as Cusinart (voiceover)
- Beszamel as Ash's Dog

== Production ==
Even though the film was produced and directed by a Japanese crew, it is a half European, half Asian work since Avalon was co-produced by a Polish film company, starred Polish actors and was filmed mostly in Wrocław and Modlin Fortress, Poland with Polish dialogue. A Japanese dub was created, however, for the film's original Japanese release and is available on the Japanese region 2 DVD.

"Shooting it in Japan was impossible," Oshii advised interviewer Andrez Bergen in a major article that appeared in Japan's Daily Yomiuri newspaper in 2004. "I didn't think of using a Japanese cast. I considered shooting in the UK or Ireland, but the towns and scenery in Poland matched my image for the movie."

According to Oshii, one of the advantages of shooting the film in Poland was that Polish Armed Forces were willing to lend their equipment (T-72 tanks and Mi-24 attack helicopters, among others) to the film makers without any additional fees.

In Europe, Avalon was screened out of competition at the 2001 Cannes Film Festival and won awards at other European festivals: in Spain, it was awarded "Best Cinematography" at the Catalan International Film Festival (2001), and in the United Kingdom, it won the "Best Film" award at Sci-Fi-London (2002).

However, the film received only limited release in North America (with most of its fanbase created via the circulation of bootleg DVDs imported from Asia) until Miramax released it on DVD in late 2003. The North American version has added narration to make it easier for the audience to understand the plot; Although the option to view the film without the English overdubbing is provided, the subtitles still display the added dialogue. The British region-free DVD has literal English subtitles which explain the King Arthur connection better and does not display added dialogue.

Such viewer help was not used in European countries, like France, where local editions only feature optional subtitles about the Polish sung opera piece, in the Polish spoken original version only.

== See also ==
- Simulated reality
