= The Homecoming =

1964 theatre play by Harold Pinter

- First edition (publ. Methuen & Co. Ltd.)
- Original language: English
- Written by: Harold Pinter
- Characters: Max; Lenny; Sam; Joey; Teddy; Ruth
- Subject: Family
- Genre: Drama
- Setting: Summer. An old house in North London.

Premiere
- Date: 3 June 1965
- Place: Aldwych Theatre, London
- Official website

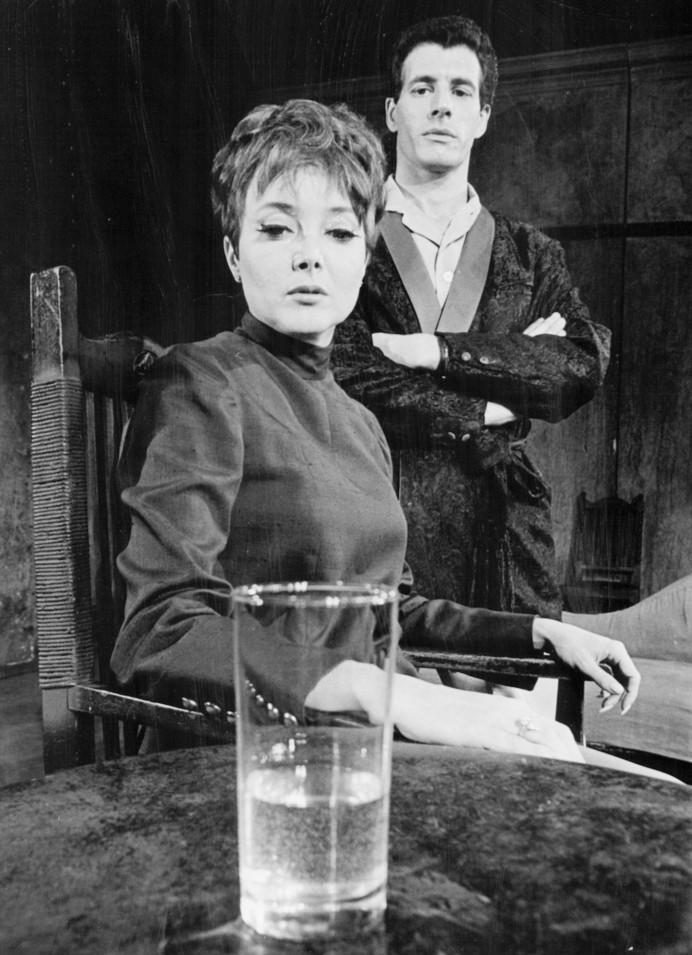
Carolyn Jones and John Church were replacements in the original Broadway production, as "Ruth" and "Lenny" (1967).

The Homecoming is a two-act play written in 1964 and published in 1965 by the English playwright and screenwriter Harold Pinter. Its premières in London (1965) and New York (1967) were both directed by Sir Peter Hall. The original Broadway production won the 1967 Tony Award for Best Play. Its 40th-anniversary Broadway production at the Cort Theatre was nominated for a 2008 Tony Award for "Best Revival of a Play".

Set in North London, the play has six characters. Five of these are men of the same family: Max, a retired butcher; his brother Sam, a chauffeur; and Max's three sons: Teddy, a philosophy professor in the United States; Lenny, a pimp who only makes discreet references to his "occupation" and his clientele and flats in the city (London); and Joey, a brute training to become a professional boxer and who works in demolition. The sixth character is a woman, Ruth, Teddy's wife. The play concerns Teddy's and Ruth's "homecoming", which has distinctly different symbolic and thematic implications. In the initial productions (as well as a 1973 film adaptation), Pinter's first wife, Vivien Merchant, played Ruth.

== Characters ==
- Max, "a man of seventy" – The patriarch of the family
- Lenny, "a man in his early thirties" – Max's son, apparently a pimp
- Sam, "a man of sixty-three" – Max's brother, a chauffeur
- Joey, "a man in his middle twenties" – Max's son, in demolition, training to be a boxer
- Teddy, "a man in his middle thirties" – Max's son, a professor of philosophy in America
- Ruth, "a woman in her early thirties" – Teddy's wife

== Setting ==
The setting is an old house in North London during the summer. All of the scenes take place in the same large room, filled with various pieces of furniture. The shape of a square arch, no longer present, is visible. Beyond the room are a hallway and staircase to the upper floor and the front door.

== Plot summary ==
After having lived in the United States for six years, Teddy brings his wife, Ruth, home for the first time to meet his working-class family in North London, where he grew up, and which she finds more familiar than their academic life in America. The two married in London before moving to the United States.

Much sexual tension occurs as Ruth teases Teddy's brothers and father, and the men taunt one another in a game of one-upmanship, resulting in Ruth's staying behind with Teddy's relatives as "one of the family" and Teddy returning home to their three sons in America without her.

=== Act one ===
The play begins in the midst of what becomes an ongoing power struggle between the two more dominant men: the father, Max, and his middle son, Lenny. Max and the other men put down one another, expressing their "feelings of resentment", with Max feminising his brother Sam, who he intimates is homosexual, while himself claiming to have himself "given birth" to his three sons.

Teddy arrives with his wife, Ruth. He reveals that he married Ruth in London six years earlier and that the couple subsequently moved to the U.S. and had three sons prior to this visit to the family home ("homecoming") to introduce her. The couple's mutual discomfort with each other, marked by her restless desire to go out exploring after he has gone to sleep, followed by her sexually suggestive first-time encounter with her dangerous, and somewhat misogynistic, brother-in-law Lenny, begin to expose problems in the marriage. She strikes a nerve when she calls him "Leonard"; he tells her that no one, aside from his late mother, has ever called him that.

After a sexually charged conversation between Lenny and Ruth, she exits. Awakened by their voices, the patriarch Max comes downstairs. Lenny does not tell Max about Teddy and Ruth's arrival at the house and engages in more verbal sparring with Max. The scene ends in a blackout.

When the lights come up the scene has changed to the following morning. Max comes down to make breakfast. When Teddy and Ruth appear and Max discovers they have been there all night without his knowledge, Max is initially enraged, assuming that Ruth is a prostitute. After being told that Ruth is his daughter-in-law, Max appears to make some effort to reconcile with Teddy.

=== Act two ===
This act opens with the men's ritual of sharing the lighting of cigars after lunch. Teddy's cigar goes out prematurely, the symbolism of which is clear.

Max's subsequent sentimental pseudo-reminiscences of family life with his late wife, Jessie, and their "boys" and his experiences as a butcher also end abruptly with a cynical twist.

After Teddy's marriage to Ruth receives Max's blessing, she relaxes and, focusing their attention on her ("Look at me"), she reveals some details about her previous life before meeting Teddy and how she views America. After Max and his brother, Sam, exit, Teddy abruptly suggests to Ruth that they return home immediately.

Apparently, he knows about her history as "a photographic model for the body" about which she reminisces when talking to Lenny alone after Teddy has gone upstairs to pack for their return trip to the United States. When he returns with the suitcases and Ruth's coat, he expresses concern about what else Lenny may have got Ruth to reveal. As Teddy looks on, Lenny initiates dancing "slowly" with Ruth.

With Teddy, Max, and Joey all looking on, Lenny kisses Ruth and then turns her over to Joey, who asserts that "she's wide open"; "Old Lenny's got a tart in here". Joey begins making out with Ruth on the sofa, telling Lenny that she is "Just up my street". Max asks Teddy if he is "going" so soon.

He tells Teddy, "Look, next time you come over, don't forget to let us know beforehand whether you're married or not. I'll always be glad to meet the wife." He says that he knows that Teddy had not told him that he was married because he was "ashamed" that he had "married a woman beneath him", just before peering to look at Ruth, who is literally still lying under Joey.

Max adds that Teddy doesn't need to be "ashamed" of Ruth's social status, assuring Teddy that he is a "broadminded man", and "she's a lovely girl. A beautiful woman", as well as "a mother too. A mother of three." Contrary to the concurrent action, even more ironically, Max observes that Teddy has "made a happy woman out of her. It's something to be proud of". Right after Max further asserts that Ruth is "a woman of quality" and "a woman of feeling", Joey and Ruth, clasped in their ongoing embrace, literally roll off the sofa on to the floor.

Suddenly pushing Joey away and standing up, Ruth appears to take command, demanding food and drink, and Joey and Lenny attempt to satisfy her demands. After Ruth questions whether or not his family has read Teddy's "critical works" — a seemingly absurdist non sequitur, or perhaps just a jibe at her academic spouse (the answer to which, in either event, is a foregone conclusion) — Teddy defends his own "intellectual equilibrium" and professional turf. Ruth and Joey go upstairs for two hours but Joey, who comes down alone without her, complains that Ruth refused to go "the whole hog".

With Ruth still upstairs, Lenny and the others reminisce about Lenny's and Joey's sexual exploits. Lenny, who the family considers an expert in sexual matters, labels Ruth a "tease", to which Teddy replies, "Perhaps he hasn't got the right touch." Lenny retorts that Joey has "had more dolly than you've had cream cakes", is "irresistible" to the ladies, "one of the few and far between". Lenny relates anecdotes about Joey's sexual prowess with other "birds".

When Lenny asks Joey, "Don't tell me you're satisfied without going the whole hog?", Joey tentatively replies that "sometimes" a man can be "happy" without "going any hog". Lenny stares at him. Joey seems to be suggesting that Ruth is so good at "the game" that Lenny ultimately gets the "idea [to] take her up with me to Greek Street".

Max volunteers that Ruth could come to live with the family, suggesting that they "should keep her" while she works for them part-time (as a prostitute). The men discuss this proposal in considerable detail, seemingly half-joking to irritate Teddy and half-serious. Sam declares the whole idea "silly" and "rubbish". Teddy adamantly refuses to "put" anything "in the kitty", as Max asks, and Lenny suggests that Teddy could hand out business cards and refer Americans he knows to Ruth when they visit London, for "a little percentage". Teddy does not decline outright but neither does he affirmatively agree to the idea. Teddy also says, in the play's only poignant turn of phrase, "She'd get old ... very quickly", which concern Max dismisses, citing the new National Health Service.

Ruth comes downstairs, dressed. Teddy is still waiting with his coat on and their packed suitcases. Teddy informs her of the family's proposal, without going into explicit detail about their intention to engage her in prostitution, saying euphemistically that she will "have to pull [her] weight" financially because they are not "very well off"; then he offers her a choice to stay in London with the family or to return to America with him.

Ruth understands exactly what is being proposed and appears very open to the proposal. She inflexibly negotiates her demands, including a three-room flat and a maid as the terms of a "contract" with Lenny, all of which must be finalised in writing with signatures and witnesses, leaving Lenny nonplussed but hapless. Ruth clearly is adept at getting what she wants and Teddy prepares to return to America without her.

Having spoken up a few times earlier to voice his objections, Sam blurts out a long-kept secret about Jessie and Max's friend MacGregor, then "croaks and collapses" and "lies still" on the floor. Briefly considering the possibility that Sam has "dropped dead" and become a "corpse", the others ascertain that he is still breathing ("not even dead"), dismiss his revelation as the product of "a diseased imagination", and ignore him thereafter.

After a pause, Ruth conditionally accepts their proposal. Teddy focuses on the inconvenience that Sam's unavailability poses for him: "I was going to ask him to drive me to London airport". Instead, he gets directions to the Underground, before saying goodbye to the others and leaving to return home to his three sons, alone. As he moves towards the front door, Ruth calls Teddy "Eddie"; after he turns around, she cryptically tells him, "Don't become a stranger". He goes out the front door, leaving his wife with the other four men in the house. The final tableau vivant depicts Ruth sitting, "relaxed in her chair", as if on a throne.

Sam lies motionless on the floor; Joey, who has walked over to Ruth, places his head in her lap, which she gently caresses. Lenny stands looking on and observing. After repeatedly insisting he is not an old man, and getting no reply from Ruth, who remains, as usual, tactically silent, Max beseeches her, "Kiss me" – the final words of the play. Ruth sits and "continues to touch Joey's head, lightly", while Lenny "stands, watching". In this "resolution" of the play (its dénouement), what might happen later remains unresolved. Such lack of plot resolution and other ambiguities are features of most of Pinter's dramas.

== Symbolism and irony of title ==
In addition to the play being about Teddy's homecoming on a literal level, critics have suggested that, on a metaphoric level, the homecoming is Ruth's. That, symbolically, Ruth comes "home" to "herself": she rediscovers her previous identity prior to her marriage to Teddy.

Ironically, as she "comes home" to this family which has been for so long woman-less (motherless, wifeless, etc.), she thus abandons her own biological family with Teddy, leaving them now similarly bereft.

By the end of the play, Ruth appears to have assumed the multiple roles of Jessie, the family's absent wife and mother, the missing woman in their household ("mother/wife/whore" in terms used by critics), while putting the American family of Ruth and Teddy in a parallel position, thus ironically reversing the situation at the beginning of the play. In that sense, the play recalls Edward's reversal of roles with the silent Matchseller in Pinter's 1959 play A Slight Ache, initially broadcast on BBC Radio 3, and similarly ironic plot and character role-reversals resulting from power struggles throughout many of Pinter's other plays.

For many critics the missing "back wall" in the "large room" of the house described by Pinter as "removed" and by Teddy as "knocked [...] down to make an open living area" after Jessie's death symbolises the absent female influence. In October 2007, as quoted by Lahr, Pinter said that he considers The Homecoming his most "muscular" play.

After Teddy comes home and introduces his London family to his wife, Ruth, Max invites her to remain with them in London; as Teddy puts it to her euphemistically: "Ruth ... the family have invited you to stay, for a little while longer. As a ... as a kind of guest". Whereas Teddy must return home to his life and family in America to fulfil his obligations, Ruth agrees to "come home" by refusing to honour her now-defunct obligations as wife and mother and more than willingly take up her part in the family business (so to speak), as well as succeeding the late Jessie (Max's wife and his sons' mother), filling the gap created by her death.

On first seeing Ruth, Max believes that his eldest son, Teddy, has brought a "filthy scrubber" into "my house", adding, "I've never had a whore under this roof before. Ever since your mother died". A major irony is that Max's apparently mistaken first assumption becomes more accurate as the family (and the audience) get to "know" Ruth better. The play makes clear to Teddy's family, even if Teddy refuses to acknowledge it, that Ruth has been, to say the least, increasingly unhappy in married life and in the United States.

When her husband insists she is "not well" and simply needs to "rest", Teddy is clearly both playing down and ignoring the cause and extent of her discontent, even depression, draping his words in almost Victorian modesty. However, he ultimately elects to leave without her rather than fight for her. It has not been Teddy's "homecoming" but that of Ruth.

== Critical response ==
Often considered to be ambiguous, enigmatic, cryptic, The Homecoming has been the subject of extensive critical debate since it premiered. According to many critics, it exposes issues of sex and power in a realistic yet aesthetically stylised manner.

Surveying Pinter's career on the occasion of the 40-anniversary Broadway production of the play at the Cort Theatre in The New Yorker, the critic John Lahr describes the impact of experiencing it: "'The Homecoming' changed my life. Before the play, I thought words were just vessels of meaning; after it, I saw them as weapons of defence. Before, I thought theatre was about the spoken; after, I understood the eloquence of the unspoken. The position of a chair, the length of a pause, the choice of a gesture, I realised, could convey volumes."

Ben Brantley praises the play's two-act plot structure, referring to its "nigh-perfect form." In the 1960s, its earliest critics complained that The Homecoming seemed "plotless", "meaningless" and "emotionless" (lacking character motivation), and they found the play "puzzling"; later critics argue that the play evokes a multiplicity of potential meanings, leading to multiple interpretations.

In Demolition Man, Lahr considers The Homecoming to be

the last and best play of Pinter's fecund early period (1957–65). It is a culmination of the poetic ambiguities, the minimalism, and the linguistic tropes of his earlier major plays: The Birthday Party (1958), whose first production lasted only a week in London, though the play was seen by eleven million people when it was broadcast on TV in 1960, and The Caretaker (1960), an immediate international hit. The Homecoming is both a family romance and a turf war.

The Homecoming directly challenges the place of morals in family life and puts their social value "under erasure" (in Derridean terminology). Teddy's profession as an academic philosopher, which, he claims, enables him to "maintain ... intellectual equilibrium" —

I'm the one who can see. That's why I write my critical works. [...] I can see what you do. It's the same as I do. But you're lost in it. You won't get me being ... I won't be lost in it. (77–78)—

ironically raises basic philosophical questions about the nature of so-called family values and the "meaning" of "love" among family members.

Some critics, such as Harold Hobson have questioned whether Teddy and Ruth are lying about their married life. Susa Hollis Merritt, however, criticised this view: "Hobson's interpretation of Teddy as merely pretending to be Ruth's husband and a professor of philosophy enables him to rationalize the man's behavior toward his wife."

Merritt further critiqued Hobson's review of the first production of the play, entitled "Pinter Minus the Moral", concluding: "although Hobson still describes The Homecoming as Pinter's 'cleverest play,' his judgment against the play's 'moral vacuum', like his denial of Teddy and Ruth's marriage, suggests his personal distress at the portrayal of marriage and what Pinter has called the characters' misdirected 'love.'"

Denial of the facts of Teddy's and Ruth's marriage and children may act as a means of expressing rejection of what occurs in the play. Ruth's actions contrast greatly with the expected behaviour of a 1960s housewife, particularly as audiences are never shown this life - their sons names and ages are never revealed. The notion of a mother willingly abandoning her husband and children to become a prostitute was unprecedented and hard to understand, especially in the 1960s.

Alluding indirectly to this critical pattern, Brantley argues that, in time, the play may appear more realistic and relevant to the lives of theatre audiences than it may have seemed when they themselves were younger or more naïve about the nature of marriage and family life. To those with strong religious values, like Hobson, the play may appear immoral or amoral. Yet, to others, its moral value resides in its very questioning of commonly accepted shibboleths about marriage and the family: "People who were originally put off by The Homecoming may now find it too close to home. It's a bit like Picasso's shockingly severe painting of Gertrude Stein from 1906, the one he predicted in time would resemble its subject. We may not have thought we saw ourselves in The Homecoming four decades ago. Now it feels like a mirror", posited critic Ben Brantley. Other critics, like Lahr in Demolition Man, remind their readers of the strong element of comedy in this play, as in many of Pinter's other plays.

== Composition history ==
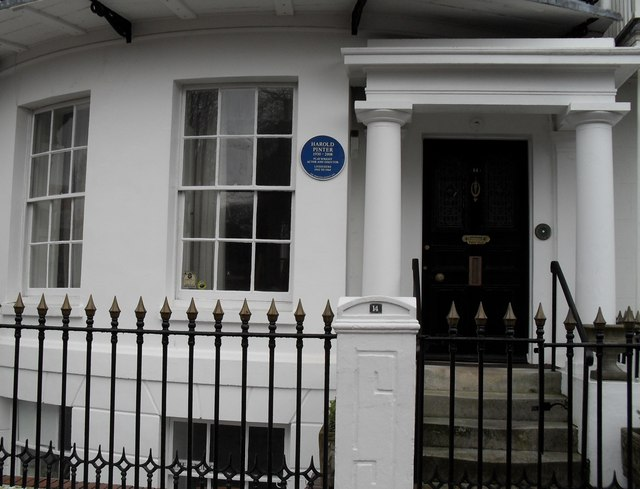
Pinter's home in Ambrose Place, Worthing, where he wrote The Homecoming

Pinter wrote The Homecoming in six weeks in 1964 from his home in the Sussex coastal town of Worthing, where, according to theatre critic John Lahr, "the magnificent barrenness of the play's North London setting was imagined as he sat at his writing desk overlooking gardens, within earshot of the sea." According to Lahr, Pinter remarked that "it kind of wrote itself."

Pinter's close friend and former schoolteacher, Joseph Brearley, was visiting Pinter after he had written the play. "I gave him the play to read," Pinter recalled. "I waited in another room. About two hours later, I heard the front door slam. I thought, Well, here we are. He doesn't like it. About an hour later, the doorbell rang. I answered it. He said, 'I had to get some air.' He said, 'It is your best.' "

== Production history ==
Productions of the play have won major theatre awards. The 1967 New York production received four Tony Awards: the Tony Award for Best Performance by a Leading Actor in a Play (Paul Rogers), the Tony Award for Best Performance by a Featured Actor in a Play (Ian Holm), the Tony Award for Best Direction of a Play (Peter Hall), and the Tony Award for Best Play (Alexander H. Cohen, prod.).

A film of the play, based on Pinter's own screenplay and also entitled The Homecoming and directed by Sir Peter Hall, was released in 1973. It features most of the original 1965 Royal Shakespeare Company cast and became part of the two-season subscription series American Film Theatre in the United States, available on DVD and distributed by Kino Lorber.

=== List of selected productions ===
See also Harold Pinter#2001–2008

London première
Royal Shakespeare Company. Dir. Peter Hall. With Paul Rogers (Max), Ian Holm (Lenny), John Normington (Sam), Terence Rigby (Joey), Michael Bryant (Teddy), and Vivien Merchant (Ruth). Aldwych Theatre, London. Opened on 3 June 1965. The pre-London tryouts opened at the New Theatre, Cardiff, on 26 March 1965.

New York première
"The first American production opened at the Music Box on 5 January 1967. With the exception of the part of Teddy, which was played by Michael Craig, the cast was as above".

Royal Exchange production
In 2002 the play was produced at the Royal Exchange in Manchester. Directed by Greg Hersov, it starred Pete Postlethwaite as Max. He won the 2002 MEN Award for best actor for his performance.

Radio broadcast
On 18 March 2007, BBC Radio 3 broadcast a new radio production of The Homecoming, directed by Thea Sharrock and produced by Martin J. Smith, with Pinter performing the role of Max (for the first time; he had previously played Lenny on stage in the 1960s), Michael Gambon as Max's brother Sam, Rupert Graves as Teddy, Samuel West as Lenny, James Alexandrou as Joey, and Gina McKee as Ruth (Martin J. Smith; West).

Broadway revival
The Tony Award-nominated 40th-anniversary Broadway revival of The Homecoming, starring James Frain as Teddy, Ian McShane as Max, Raul Esparza as Lenny, Michael McKean as Sam, Eve Best as Ruth, and Gareth Saxe as Joey, directed by Daniel Sullivan, and produced by Buddy Freitag, opened on 16 December 2007, for a "20-week limited engagement" through 13 April 2008, at the Cort Theatre. It received Tony Award nominations for Best Revival of a Play, Best Actress in a Play (Eve Best) and Best Featured Actor in a Play (Raul Esparza). It also received the Drama Desk Award for Outstanding Ensemble Performance. Charlie Rose spoke with actor Ian McShane about his portrayal of Max in this revival.

Almeida revival
The Homecoming was revived at the Almeida Theatre, London, from 31 January through 22 March 2008. The cast included Kenneth Cranham, Neil Dudgeon, Danny Dyer, Jenny Jules, and Nigel Lindsay. Dan Wooller photographed the first-night "post-show party at the Almeida, including Harold Pinter, Peter Hall, and several other first-night guests."

Trafalgar Revival
2015, performed at the Trafalgar Studios, London, starring John Macmillan, Keith Allen, John Simm, Gemma Chan, Ron Cook and Gary Kemp. Directed by Jamie Lloyd. Design by Soutra Gilmour. Lighting by Richard Howell. Sound by George Dennis.

Others
Other productions of The Homecoming have at times been listed on the home page of Pinter's official website and through its lefthand menu of links to the "Calendar" ("Worldwide Calendar").

A film with the same name was made in the UK in 1973, featuring several actors from the London premiere.

The play was chosen by Lusaka Theatre Club as its entry for the 1967 Zambia Drama Festival, and was awarded prizes for best production and best actor (Norman Williams as Lenny). The director was Trevor Eastwood.

== Awards and nominations ==
=== Original Broadway production ===
Year	Award	Category	Nominee	Result
1967	Tony Award	Best Play		Won
1967	Tony Award	Best Actor in a Play	Paul Rogers	Won
1967	Tony Award	Best Actress in a Play	Vivien Merchant	Nominated
1967	Tony Award	Best Featured Actor in a Play	Ian Holm	Nominated
1967	Tony Award	Best Scenic Design	John Bury	Nominated
1967	Tony Award	Best Direction of a Play	Peter Hall	Nominated

=== 1991 Broadway revival ===
Year	Award	Category	Nominee	Result
1992	Theatre World Award		Lindsay Crouse	Won

=== 2007 Broadway revival ===
Year	Award	Category	Nominee	Result
2008	Drama Desk Award	Outstanding Ensemble Performance	Eve Best, Raul Esparza, James Frain, Michael McKean, Ian McShane,& Gareth Saxe	Won
2008	Tony Award	Best Revival of a Play		Nominated
2008	Tony Award	Best Actress in a Play	Eve Best	Nominated
2008	Tony Award	Best Featured Actor in a Play	Raul Esparza	Nominated

== See also ==
- Characteristics of Harold Pinter's work
