= Donald of Ogilvy =

Eighth-century Scottish saint

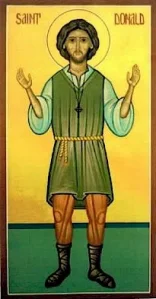
St Donald of Ogilvy by Nicholas Papas

St. Donald of Ogilvy, also known as Donivald or Domhnall, was an eighth-century Scottish saint who lived at Ogilvy, in the former Forfarshire.

== Life ==
Upon the death of his wife, Donald converted his home into a hermitage where he lived a monastic life with his nine daughters (known as the Nine Maidens or the Holy Nine Virgins). Upon his death they entered a monastery in Abernethy. Churches throughout Scotland were dedicated to the Nine Maidens. Their feast day is 15 July.
