= The Maid of Orleans =

The Maid of Orleans may refer to:

- Joan of Arc
- "The Maid of Orleans" (poem), a 1730 unfinished poem by Voltaire
- The Maid of Orleans (play), an 1801 historical tragedy by Friedrich Schiller
- The Maid of Orleans (opera), an 1881 an opera by Pyotr Ilyich Tchaikovsky based on Schiller's play
- "Maid of Orleans (The Waltz Joan of Arc)", a 1982 single by Orchestral Manoeuvres in the Dark (OMD), sequel to their earlier single "Joan of Arc"
- Jasminum sambac, a flowering plant sometimes referred to as Maid of Orleans
- オルレアンの少女 (Maid of Orleans), a song by Japanese visual kei band exist†trace.
- Maid of Orleans, a song by Spanish power metal band Dark Moor
- Maid of Orleans (horse)

== See also ==
- Joan of Arc (disambiguation)
