= The Maids =

1947 play by Jean Genet

Les Bonnes
- Cover of L'Arbalète No.12 (May 1947), first publication
- Original language: French
- Written by: Jean Genet
- Characters: Claire; Solange; Madame
- Setting: Madame's bedroom

Premiere
- Date: April 17, 1947
- Place: Théâtre de l'Athénée; Paris

The Maids (French: Les Bonnes [le bɔn]) is a 1947 play by the French dramatist Jean Genet. It was first performed at the Théâtre de l'Athénée in Paris in a production that opened on 17 April 1947, which Louis Jouvet directed.

The play has been revived in France, the UK, and the United States on multiple occasions, sometimes with men playing the roles of the maids. A TV dramatization, Stuepigerne, was produced by Danish national broadcaster Danmarks Radio in 1962. A film adaptation of the play was released in 1974. Swedish composer Peter Bengtson adapted the play in 1994 for a chamber opera.

== Background ==
Genet loosely based his play on the infamous sisters Christine and Léa Papin, who brutally murdered their employer and her daughter in Le Mans, France, in 1933. In an introduction written for The Maids, Jean-Paul Sartre quotes a line from Genet's novel Our Lady of the Flowers in which a character muses that if he had a play written for women, he would cast adolescent boys in the parts. Sartre then speculates on having this idea applied to The Maids.

The play was first published in May 1947 in the French literary journal L'Arbalète, shortly after its premiere in Paris. Genet later revised the text, and his definitive version was published as a standalone edition in 1954. Louis Jouvet, who directed the 1947 premiere production, used a slightly modified script that was published in 1958 by Gallimard and became the standard French text.

== Plot ==
Solange and Claire are two sisters who are housemaids. When their mistress (Madame) is away, they take turns role-playing Madame while the other plays her maid. In this way, they portray both sides of the power divide. Each, when playing Madame, demeans and abases her sister. There is a "furtive" eroticism to their interactions. The ultimate goal of their role-playing is carrying out the real murder of Madame as the only way to free themselves of subjugation. The maids' deliberate pace, their emotionally-charged arguments, and their devotion to detail guarantee that they always fail to actualize their fantasies of ceremoniously "killing" Madame at the ritual's dénouement with unexpected consequences.

Solange and Claire send incriminating letters about the master of the house (Monsieur) to the police. After one of their incomplete rituals, they receive a phone call from Monsieur who says he's out on bail. Worrying that Madame will figure out what they've done, they resolve to drug her with sleeping pills in her tea. Madame returns, but when she discovers Monsieur is out on bail, she leaves once again, despite the maids' many attempts to get her to drink the drugged tea. Solange and Claire act out their ceremony once again, and finally act out Madame's death. Claire then insists on drinking the drugged tea and lies down in Madame's bed as Solange describes her funeral.

== Characters ==
- Solange – Maid/sister
- Claire – Maid/sister
- Madame – Haughty, disdainful mistress

== Production history ==
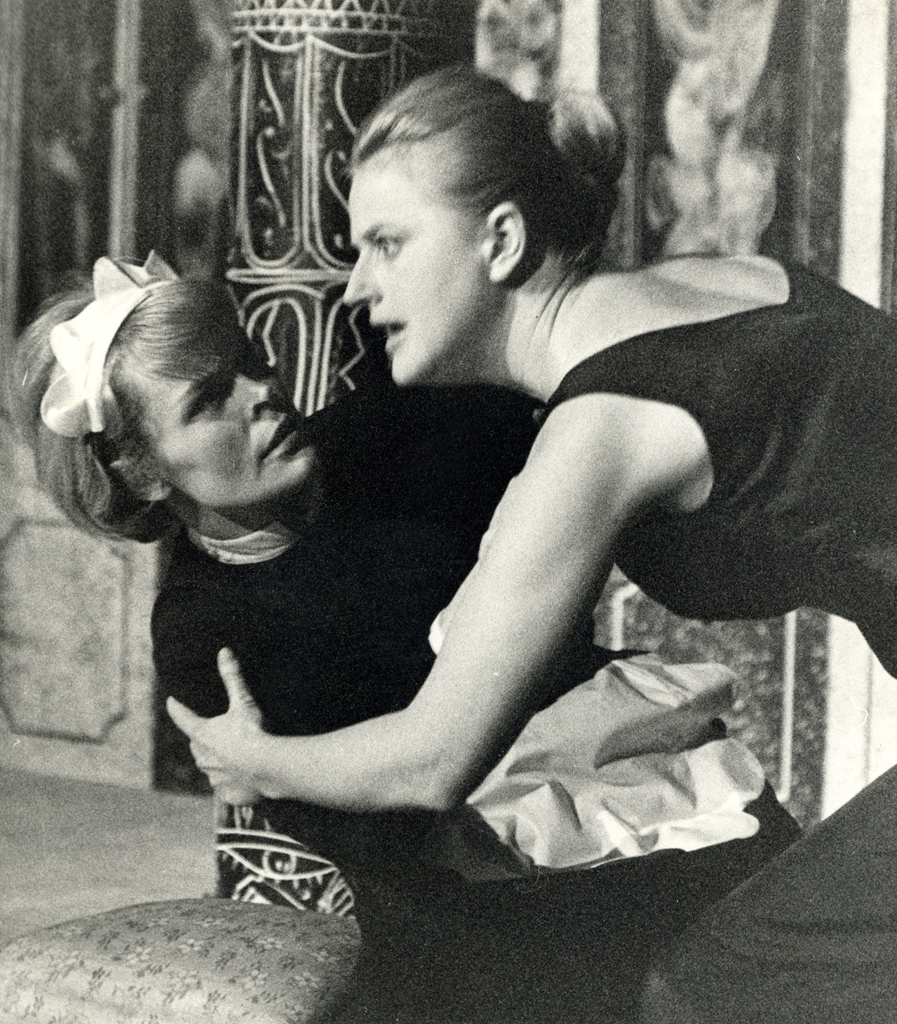
The production by the Maribor Slovene National Theatre in 1969

The world premiere took place on 17 April 1947 at the Théâtre de l'Athénée in Paris, directed by Louis Jouvet with set design by Christian Bérard. The cast featured Monique Mélinand as Solange, Yvette Etiévant as Claire, and Yolande Laffont as Madame.

In Britain, the play was first presented in French by the Institute of Contemporary Arts, initially at the Mercury Theatre, Notting Hill Gate, London, in 1952. Peter Zadek directed, while Eduardo Paolozzi provided the scenic design. Selma Vaz Dias played Solange, Olive Gregg played Claire, and Oriel Ross played Madame. The production subsequently transferred to the Royal Court Theatre, where Betty Stockfeld played Madame and David de Bethel provided the scenic design. Zadek also directed the play's first English-language production in Britain, which opened on 5 June 1956 at the New Lindsey Theatre Club. Selma Vaz Dias again played Solange and Betty Stockfeld played Madame, while Hazel Penwarden played Claire.

The play was produced at Tempo Playhouse in New York City in 1955, with Julie Bovasso originally as Claire and later as Solange. Bovasso won the first best actress Obie Award for The Maids.

Minos Volanakis directed the play at the Oxford Playhouse in 1963. This production was reprised in 1964 in a double bill with Bertolt Brecht's The Exception and the Rule.

In 1969, the Maribor Slovene National Theatre staged the play, with Bogdana Bratuž as Solange and Milena Muhič as Claire, directed by Janez Križaj.

The play was revived in London at the Greenwich Theatre in 1973 with the actresses Vivien Merchant as Madame, Glenda Jackson as Solange and Susannah York as Claire. This production was filmed as part of the American Film Theatre series in 1974, directed by Christopher Miles and photographed by Douglas Slocombe. Miles and Slocombe planned the 12-day shoot with a single camera which could track anywhere over the set, and deliberately implemented many of Genet's theatrical devices for the film.

The 1987 Royal Shakespeare Company's production at The Barbican (The Pit) was directed by Gerard Murphy, designed by David Ultz and starred Miles Anderson as Claire, Gerard Murphy as Solange, and Patrick Bailey as Madam. It was twinned with Deathwatch with the same actors.

Clare Davidson directed it at Dublin Theatre Festival; subsequently at The Lyric Theatre Studio Hammersmith on 12 October 1981 with Mark Rylance as Madame.

Roman Viktyuk directed the play in 1988 at the Satirikon Theatre in Moscow, with movement direction by Valentin Gneushev, choreography by Alla Sigalova, and music by Asaf Faradzhov. The production has remained in repertoire and is now staged at The Melnikov Stage (formerly the Roman Viktyuk Theatre).

Cesear's Forum, a minimalist theatre company, produced the play in Chicago in 1990. Claire and Solange were portrayed by male actors in drag, but Madame was cast female. In his Chicago Reader review, Albert Williams writes: "Genet deliberately sought to invoke the sense of ceremony expressed in (as he wrote to his publisher) 'the sacrifice of the Mass'... the endless shifting of roles among the women, and the patent artificiality of the female impersonation are the poetic means by which the playwright explores his themes..."

In Canada, a 2011 production at Buddies in Bad Times in Toronto, Ontario, used female and male casting, with the roles of Solange and Claire played by Diane D'Aquila and Ron Kennell.

A 2013 Sydney Theatre Company production, adapted by Andrew Upton and directed by Benedict Andrews, starred Cate Blanchett as Claire, Isabelle Huppert as Solange, and Elizabeth Debicki as the Mistress. The production was shown as part of the Lincoln Center Festival in August 2014 at New York City Center. Andrews employed contemporary devices that combined theatre with film in his use of video cameras, stylized choreography, popular "underground" music soundtracks, liberal use of profanity, and cultural modernization such as offhanded comments from the Mistress on her dresses: "McQueen designed it for me."

In 2016, a production starring Uzo Aduba and Zawe Ashton as Solange and Claire, and Laura Carmichael as Mistress, was directed by Jamie Lloyd and performed at Trafalgar Studios in London. The script was from the same translation as the 2013 Andrews-directed performance.

In Australia, a 2021 production starring Marta Dusseldorp and Essie Davis as Solange and Claire, and Stephanie Jack as Mistress, was directed by Ben Winspear and performed at The Playhouse Theatre in Hobart.

In 2025, a production directed by Kip Williams played at the Donmar Warehouse in London, starring Phia Saban and Lydia Wilson as Solange and Claire, and Yerin Ha as Madame. Set in the social media era, it featured live-streamed content displayed on the walls. The production transferred to St Ann's Warehouse off-Broadway for a limited run in 2026.
