= Paul Rogers (actor) =

English actor (1917–2013)

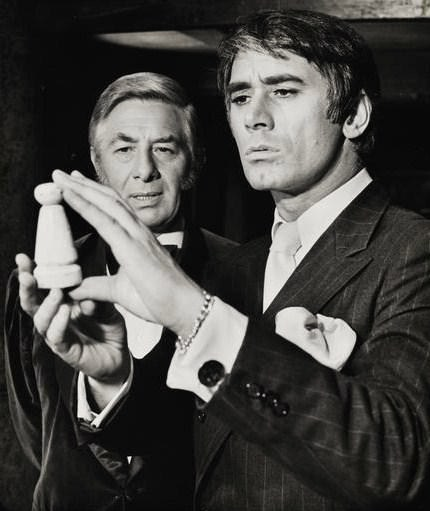
- Paul Rogers (left) and Keith Baxter in the Broadway production of Sleuth (1971)
- Born: 22 March 1917; Plympton, Devon, England
- Died: 6 October 2013 (aged 96); London, England
- Occupation: Actor
- Years active: 1932–1997
- Spouses: Muriel Jocelyn Maire Wynne (m. 1939; div. 1955) Rosalind Mary Boxall (m. 1955; died 2004)
- Children: 4

Paul Rogers (22 March 1917 – 6 October 2013) was an English actor of film, stage and television. He was the first winner of the BAFTA TV Award Best Actor in 1955 and won a Tony Award for Best Performance by a Leading Actor in a Play for The Homecoming in 1967.

== Early life and career ==
Paul Rogers was born in Plympton, Devon, and attended Newton Abbot Grammar School. He later trained at the Michael Chekhov Theatre Studio at Dartington Hall. From 1940 to 1946 he served in the Royal Navy during World War II, before returning to acting at the Bristol Old Vic.

He went on to appear in many West End and Broadway productions, and won the Tony for Best Actor for his role in Harold Pinter's play The Homecoming in 1967. He played the role of Sir in the first Broadway production of Ronald Harwood's play The Dresser.

=== Later career ===
Rogers was a long-serving member of the Royal Shakespeare Company. His most notable performances with the Company included Nick Bottom in A Midsummer Night's Dream and Sir John Falstaff in Henry IV parts 1 and 2.

His film appearances include Beau Brummel (1954), Our Man in Havana (1959), The Trials of Oscar Wilde (1960), Billy Budd (1962), The Third Secret (1964), The Shoes of the Fisherman (1968), A Midsummer Night's Dream (1968), Three Into Two Won't Go (1969), The Looking Glass War (1970), The Homecoming (1973) and Oscar and Lucinda (1997).

He also appeared frequently on television, in productions such as The Tenth Man (1988) and Romeo and Juliet on Producers' Showcase and Public Eye.

== Personal life ==
Paul Rogers was married to Muriel Jocelyn Maire Wynne, by whom he had two children. His second marriage was to Rosalind Boxall, by whom he also had two children. He and Rosalind remained married until her death in 2004. He died in London in 2013, aged 96.

== Selected filmography ==
- Murder in the Cathedral (1951)
- The Beachcomber (1954) - Rev. Owen Jones
- Beau Brummel (1954) - William Pitt
- Svengali (1954) - Taffy
- Our Man in Havana (1959) - Hubert Carter
- The Trials of Oscar Wilde (1960) - Frank Harris
- Circle of Deception (1960) - Maj. William Spence
- No Love for Johnnie (1961) - Sydney Johnson
- The Mark (1961) - Roy Milne
- The Pot Carriers (1962) - Governor
- Life for Ruth (1962) - Counsel Hart Jacobs
- The Wild and the Willing (1962) - Prof. George Chown
- Billy Budd (1962) - Philip Seymour - First Lieutenant
- Stolen Hours (1963) - Dr. Eric McKenzie
- The Third Secret (1964) - Dr. Milton Gillen
- He Who Rides a Tiger (1965) - Supt. Taylor
- Decline and Fall... of a Birdwatcher (1968) - Chief Warder
- The Shoes of the Fisherman (1968) - Augustinian
- A Midsummer Night's Dream (1968) - Bottom
- Three Into Two Won't Go (1969) - Jack Roberts
- The Looking Glass War (1970) - Haldane
- The Reckoning (1970) - John Hazlitt
- I Want What I Want (1972) - Mr. Waites
- The Homecoming (1973) - Max
- Lost in the Stars (1974) - James Jarvis
- The Abdication (1974) - Altieri
- The Secret Agent (1975) – Adolf Verloc
- Mister Quilp (1975) - Single Gent / Henry Trent
- Nothing Lasts Forever (1984) - Hugo
- The Tenth Man (1988) – Breton
- Oscar and Lucinda (1997) - Gambling Steward (final film role)
