= Nine Maidens =

Nine Maidens may refer to:

- Boskednan stone circle, traditionally known as the Nine Maidens
- Nine Maidens stone circle, near Belstone on Dartmoor
- Nine Maidens stone row, near St Columb Major in Cornwall
- Nine Maidens Downs, near Four Lanes in Cornwall
- The Nine Maidens, an album by John Renbourn
- Nine maidens (mythology), a theme in mythology
