= Maiden Lane =

Maiden Lane may refer to:

== Places ==
=== England ===
- Maiden Lane, Covent Garden, a street in London
- Maiden Lane Estate, a housing estate in London
- Maiden Lane railway stations, two closed stations near Maiden Lane in London
- York Way, a street in London formerly called Maiden Lane
- Skinners Lane, a street in the City of London formerly called Maiden Lane

=== United States ===
- Maiden Lane (Manhattan), a street in New York City
- Maiden Lane (San Francisco), a street in San Francisco
- Maiden Lane Bridge, the namesake of Maiden Lane in Albany, New York
- Maiden Lane Historic District, the namesake of Maiden Lane in Raleigh, North Carolina

== Other uses ==
- Maiden Lane, any one of three limited liability companies created by the Federal Reserve Bank of New York in the Maiden Lane Transactions
- 15 Maiden Lane, a film set in the neighborhood of New York City's Maiden Lane
