= Buddy Freitag =

American theater producer

Edgar "Buddy" Freitag (1932 – May 30, 2012) was an American Broadway theatre producer, especially from 2007 to 2012. Freitag produced numerous Broadway musicals and shows in partnership with his wife, producer Barbara Freitag. His most recent credits included the 2011 Broadway revival of Porgy and Bess, Nice Work If You Can Get It in 2012, End of the Rainbow in 2012, and Memphis in 2009.

Freitag earned a bachelor's degree from Baruch College in 1953. He served in the United States Army for two years following his graduation from Baruch. Freitag then launched a long career in advertising and mortgage banking. He worked in New York advertising for seventeen years, becoming the vice president of the Grey Advertising. Freitag then left the ad industry and co-founded United Financial of America, Inc., a brokerage and commercial mortgage firm.

Buddy and Barbara Freitag did not begin their joint careers in theater production until he sold United Financial of America. The couple initially produced shows both on and Off Broadway. Their early credits included The Goat, or Who Is Sylvia?, West Side Story, Dirty Rotten Scoundrels, In the Heights, Legally Blonde, and Anna in the Tropics.

Buddy Freitag finally became a full Broadway producer in 2007 with the opening of the Broadway revival, The Homecoming. Freitag then produced or co-produced Blithe Spirit, The Miracle Worker, Catch Me If You Can, and Passing Strange.

Freitag died from complications of a brain tumor in New York City on May 30, 2012, at the age of 80. He was survived by his wife and professional partner, Barbara, and their four children – Larry Freitag, Eve Freitag, Harry Falk, Liz Freitag Dranoff.
