= Thy Majestie =

Italian band

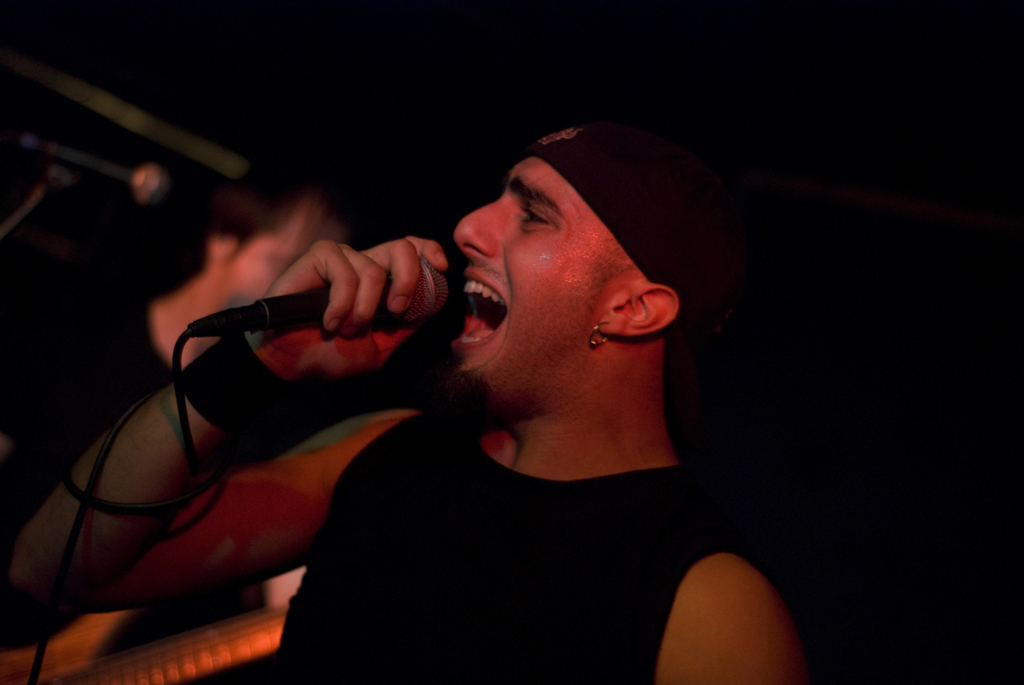
- Vocalist Dario Cascio and Thy Majestie live at Fear Dark Festival, 2008.

Background information
- Origin: Palermo, Sicily, Italy
- Genres: Power metal, symphonic metal
- Years active: 1999 - present
- Labels: Scarlet, Dark Balance
- Members: Dario Cascio; Dario D'Alessandro; Claudio Diprima; Simone Campione; Giuseppe Carrubba
- Past members: Gabriele Grilli; Michele Cristofalo; Giulio Di Gregorio; Matt Aub; Giovanni Santini; Dario Grillo
- Website: www.thymajestie.com

Thy Majestie is an Italian power metal band that formed in 1999. Their music is typically cinematic, epic, symphonic, progressive and darker than typical power metal with symphonic influences. They have released five full-length albums.

== Biography ==
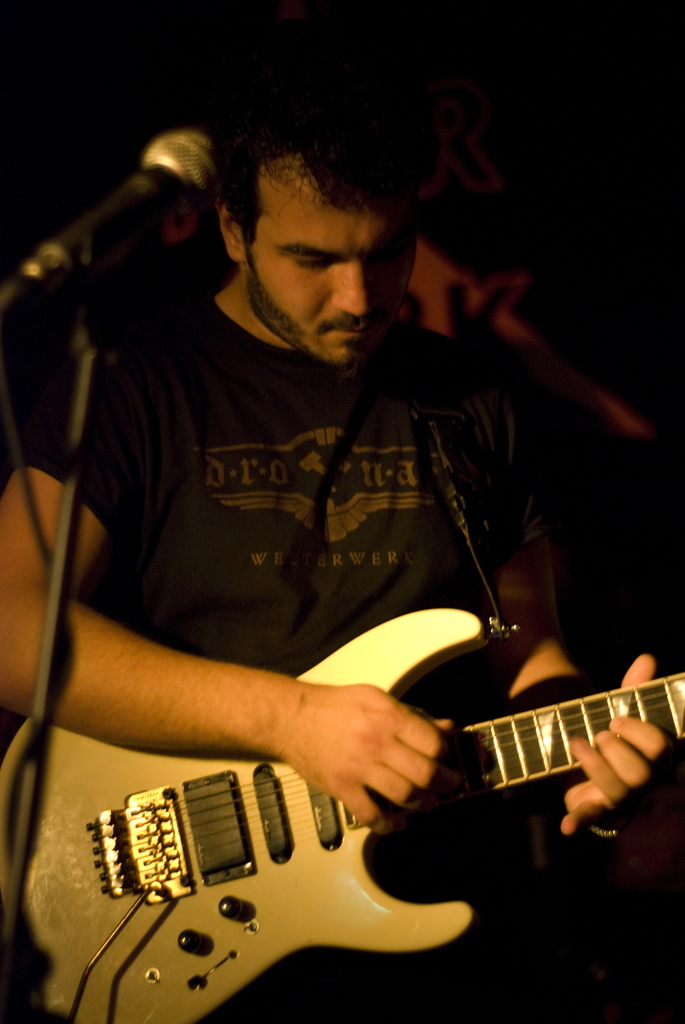
Guitarist Simone Campione and Thy Majestie live at Fear Dark Festival, 2008.

The band was started by Giuseppe Bondì and Claudio Diprima with the desire to create their own music after playing in a cover band. Maurizio Malta, Giovanni Santini, Dario D'Alessandro and Dario Grillo joined them to form Thy Majestie. After releasing Sword, Crown and Shields, a 3-track demo, Thy Majestie composed new material which was recorded in March 1999 titled Perpetual Glory. It was highly praised by Italian metal magazines and they were able to sign a contract with Scarlet Records. In March 2000 they began working on their debut album The Lasting Power which was finished in April 2000.

In September 2001 Limb Music (who produced Rhapsody of Fire) took notice of Thy Majestie but could not sign a deal with them because they were already signed to Scarlet Music to record two albums. In January 2002 Thy Majestie was contacted by Thomas Youngblood to support him on his European tour with his band Kamelot but they could not afford travel expenses and had to record another album 2 months later.

In 2002, they released the album Hastings 1066 which is based on the Battle of Hastings.

In November 2003, vocalist Dario Grillo left the band to pursue a solo career (as leader of the band Platens). In December 2003, Gabriele Grilli (who has also played in Doomsword) joined as his replacement. But in October 2004 he left as well "due to personal reasons", one of them being the distance between Grilli's hometown, Varese, and Palermo, where the other members of the band live. One song was released with Gabriele on vocals, namely a demo version of The Siege of Paris, later to appear on the Jeanne d'Arc album. Shortly thereafter, Giulio Di Gregorio (also in Irencros) was announced as the new singer.

2005 saw the release of the third Thy Majestie album, Jeanne d'Arc, which is a concept album about the French heroine Jeanne d'Arc. The album was released through Scarlet Records. Its style has been compared to that of the Italian band Labyrinth.

The 3 of May 2005, Giulio Di Gregorio was expelled from the band due to his poor knowledge of the English language and his numerous health problems which kept him from performing live with the band. After a short period when USA-based singer Matt Aub (from Timelord) had been singing for the band, it was announced that Thy Majestie's first vocalist, Dario Grillo would be returning to the band. His return, however, caused the same problems experienced four years earlier and lead to a definitive separation. Dario Grillo was replaced by Fingerbang singer Dario Cascio. At the same time guitarist Giovanni Santini decided to leave the band and was replaced by Simone Campione. During the end of year 2007, the other founding member, Giuseppe Bondi, left Thy Majestie for personal reasons.

A new keyboarder, Valerio Castorino, was taken in and the band signed with a new record label, Dark Balance Records. Thy Majestie performed at the Immortal Metal Fest in Finland on 19 April 2008 as well as at Fear Dark in Zwolle, the Netherlands on 24 May 2008 and in Stuttgart, Germany on 1 June 2008. The group released the album Dawn on 1 September 2008, which has been compared to the Swedish metal scene, namely Axenstar and Dragonland.

Valerio Castorino, who toured with Thy Majestie during their last gigs in Europe, and Dario Cascio left the band because of private matters. Giuseppe Carrubba, who also plays with Inner Quest, an Italian Progressive metal band, and Alessio Taormina replaced him. The band released their 5th full-length album, ShiHuangDi, in 2012 for Scarlet Records.

== Discography ==
- Perpetual Glory (self-production, 1999)
- The Lasting Power (Scarlet Records, 2000)
- 1066 (Demo, 2001)
- Hastings 1066 (Scarlet Records, 2002)
- Echoes of War (EP, 2003)
- Jeanne d'Arc (Scarlet Records, 2005)
- Dawn (Dark Balance Records 2008)
- ShiHuangDi (Scarlet Records 2012)

== Members ==
=== Current Line-up ===
- Giuseppe Carrubba - Keyboards (April 2009-)
- Dario D'Alessandro - Bass (1999-)
- Claudio Diprima - Drums (1998-)
- Simone Campione - Guitar (April 2007-)
- Alessio Taormina - Vocals (2010-)

=== Former members ===
- Dario Cascio - Vocals (2008–2010)
- Gabriele Grilli - Vocals (2003–2004)
- Giulio Di Gregorio - Vocals (2004- May 2006)
- Matt Aub - Vocals (May–September 2006)
- Giovanni Santini - Guitar (1998- April 2007)
- Dario Grillo - Vocals (1998–2003; September 2006- April 2007)
- Giuseppe Bondì - Keyboards (1998–2007)
- Maurizio Malta - Guitar (1998–2008)
- Valerio Castorino - Keyboards (November 2008-)
