= Katie Skelly =

Cartoonist

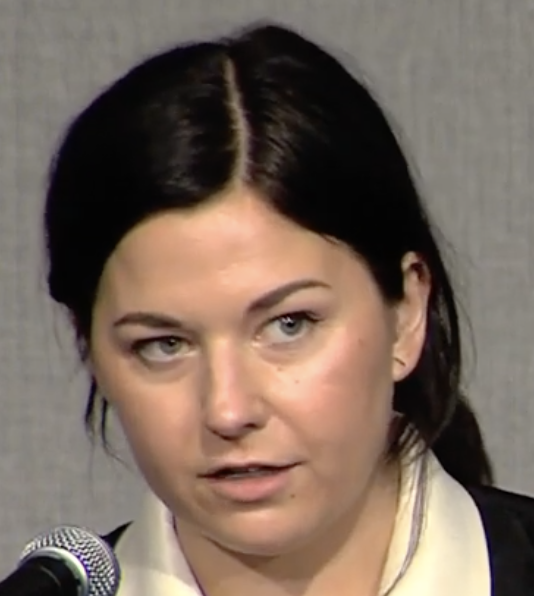
- Skelly speaking at the Small Press Expo in 2019
- Born: February 5, 1985 (age 41); Bethlehem, Pennsylvania
- Known for: comics artist

Katie Skelly is an American comics artist and illustrator. She is best known for her graphic novels My Pretty Vampire, Maids, and Nurse Nurse.

== Biography ==
Katie Skelly was born in Bethlehem, Pennsylvania. Her father's side of the family operated a newsstand in downtown Bethlehem and he brought her comics from the stand to read. She began drawing her own comics in high school, and after graduating from college, Skelly began her science fiction-themed, Barbarella-inspired series Nurse, Nurse. She received a B. A. in Art History from Syracuse University and followed it with graduate coursework at City College of New York.

== Works ==
In 2017, Fantagraphics Books published Skelly's first hardcover graphic novel My Pretty Vampire, notable for its "dramatic colors" and "sense of mercurial motion". Inspired by the Italian horror films of Dario Argento and the early work of comics illustrator Jean-Claude Forest, the story follows a young vampire who escapes captivity by her brother to discover herself through surreal, sensual and often violent adventures in the modern world.

Skelly's other works include Operation Margarine (2014, Adhouse Books), for which she was awarded the inaugural Emerging Artist Prize at the Cartoon Crossroads Columbus Festival in 2015; The Agency (2018, Fantagraphics Underground); and illustrations for the Alex de Campi penned Twisted Romance: Heartbreak Incorporated (2018, Image Comics), which received a 2019 Eisner Awards nomination for best anthology.

Among her early works, Skelly self-published Nurse Nurse in chapter-sized installments until Sparkplug Comics founder Dylan Williams offered to publish the collected issues. Nurse Nurse was one of the last pieces Williams finished publishing before he died in 2011.

Skelly has written and lectured about comics for The Comics Journal, the Center for Cartoon Studies, Fordham University, and The New School, among others. In 2017 she told NPR: "When I started drawing comics, it was to make my own reality. But now as an adult, I draw them to better understand why everyday life is extraordinary."

Currently living and working in Brooklyn, New York, Skelly's biographical graphic novel Maids, based on the lives of convicted murderers Christine and Léa Papin, was published by Fantagraphics Books in October 2020. Library Journal's advance review of the book discusses the "horror of the Papin sisters’ crimes," noting that Skelly's "perceptive examination of the complex bond between Catherine and Lea evokes incredible sympathy for the two nonetheless."

== Exhibitions ==
Skelly's first solo exhibition Skellyworld ran at The Naughton Gallery at Queen's University Belfast in Northern Ireland August 8 through October 6, 2019. The show gave insights into Skelly's work and artistic process, exhibiting original drawings from all of her major published works, as well as paintings, sketchbooks, video projects, self-produced merchandise, and a 78-card tarot deck that she designed and illustrated. Exhibition curatorial notes listed Japanese comics, bandes dessinée, science fiction and B movies from the 1960s and 1970s as Skelly's inspirations, and noted that she "examines exploitation genres for transgressive elements" in her work.

Her art has also appeared in group exhibitions, including 18+ at Recspec Gallery in Austin, TX (2018); Speculative Skins at The Naughton Gallery (2018); From Panel to Panel X: C/Overt Movement in Comicana, at the Medialia Gallery in New York City (2014), and Karma-Con at the Rubin Museum of Art (2012).
