= The Homecoming (film) =

1973 British film by Peter Hall

- Directed by: Peter Hall
- Written by: Harold Pinter
- Produced by: Ely Landau
- Starring: Paul Rogers; Ian Holm; Cyril Cusack; Terence Rigby; Michael Jayston; Vivien Merchant
- Cinematography: David Watkin
- Edited by: Rex Pyke
- Distributed by: Seven Keys (UK); American Film Theatre (US)
- Release date: October 29, 1973 (U.S.)
- Running time: 111 minutes
- Countries: United Kingdom; United States
- Language: English

The Homecoming is a 1973 British-American drama film directed by Peter Hall and starring Paul Rogers, Ian Holm, Cyril Cusack, Terence Rigby, Michael Jayston and Vivien Merchant. It was written by Harold Pinter based on his 1964 play of the same title. The film was produced by Ely Landau for the American Film Theatre, which presented thirteen film adaptations of plays in the United States from 1973 to 1975. The film was screened at the 1974 Cannes Film Festival, but was not entered into the main competition.

== Plot ==
Teddy brings his wife home to meet his estranged family.

== Cast ==
All cast members from the play's first performance in 1965 reprise their roles here, with the exception of Cyril Cusack and Michael Jayston who replace John Normington and Michael Bryant respectively.

- Paul Rogers as Max, father of Lenny, Teddy, and Joey
- Ian Holm as Lenny
- Cyril Cusack as Sam, brother of Max
- Terence Rigby as Joey
- Michael Jayston as Teddy
- Vivien Merchant as Ruth

== Reception ==
Critic Jonathan Rosenbaum wrote in The Monthly Film Bulletin: "An attempt, largely successful, to approximate Peter Hall's original stage versions of The Homecoming in London (1965) and New York (1967) ... The only concessions to 'opening out' the action are a few establishing or continuity shots of the street outside, some pointless glimpses of Ruth taking her walk, and brief forays into the kitchen. ... In a manner oddly reminiscent of several plays in Ibsen's middle period, The Homecoming is carefully geared to disclose facts about its characters at precise junctures so that events and identities simultaneously click into place; ... the remarkable control of Pinter's language guarantees that the dramatic situations are revealed to be even more abstract and diagrammatic as they steadily accumulate psychological density."

Variety wrote: "Ely Landau's American Film Theatre production of The Homecoming is nothing less than superb. Adapted from his original play by Harold Pinter, the profoundly absorbing, at times devastating filmic examination of a family's interpersonal relationships masterfully captures both the subtle and obvious shades of love-hate intraaction between five men and a woman. Homecoming is one of those special efforts that plays off in the head as much as on the set. Each complex character is artfully defined by Pinter and carefully translated by director Peter Hall. The cast was in the original (1965) stage production together, and the degree of ensemble play, the sensitive shifting of postures and exchanges of dialogs, adds mightily to Pinter's brilliant work."

The Hollywood Reporter wrote: "One is hard put to think of a more difficult piece to bring to the screen. Pinter's rigorous structure, the play's spare formal beauty, the leaps in logic – all such qualities would seem doomed to collapse on film. But Hall is a precise filmmaker, and this movie feels something like the way a Magritte painting looks – impeccably crafted, witty, frightening, willful. When it was first performed in the Sixties, the play's meaning or lack thereof was the cause of considerable journalistic and/or intellectual debate. Now it seems like a crystal clear dramatic essay on sexual politics and the destructive power of what has come to be called the nuclear family."

On Rotten Tomatoes, the film has a score of 100% based on 5 reviews, with an average rating of 8.7/10.
