= Maiden Lane Historic District =

Historic district in North Carolina, United States

- U.S. National Register of Historic Places
- U.S. Historic district
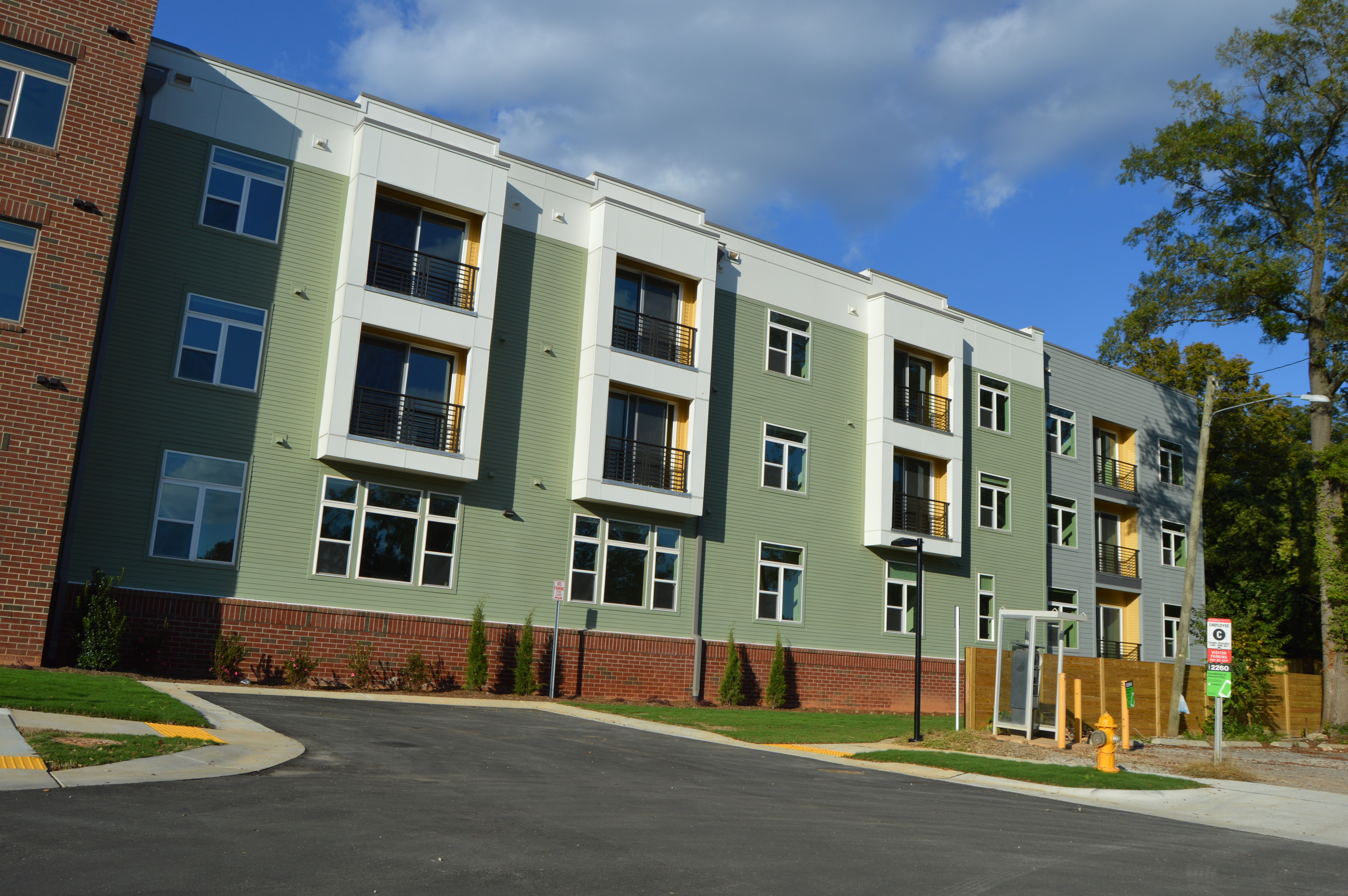
- Site of the district, occupied by c. 2020 new construction

- Location within North Carolina Location within the United States
- Location: 2-20 Maiden Ln., Raleigh, North Carolina
- Coordinates: 35°47′19″N 78°39′47″W
- Area: 2.7 acres (1.1 ha)
- Architectural style: Queen Anne, Colonial Revival
- NRHP reference No.: 06000338
- Added to NRHP: May 3, 2006

The Maiden Lane Historic District is a national historic district located at Raleigh, North Carolina. The district encompasses 12 contributing residential buildings and was developed between about 1893 and 1923. The district includes notable examples of Queen Anne and Colonial Revival style architecture. Notable houses include the Isabella Morrison Hill House (c. 1895), Irby-Brewer House (c. 1893), Allie H. Kirks House (c. 1914), Love Virginia Davis House (c. 1905), and Frank Brown House (1923).

In 2006, the district was listed on the National Register of Historic Places.

== See also ==
- List of Registered Historic Places in North Carolina
