= Jeanne d'Arc (Thy Majestie album) =

Studio album by Thy Majestie
- Released: November 28, 2005
- Genre: Symphonic power metal
- Length: 60:13
- Label: Scarlet Records

Thy Majestie chronology
Hastings 1066 (2002)	Jeanne d'Arc (2005)	Dawn (2008)

Jeanne d'Arc is a concept album by Italian symphonic power metal act Thy Majestie. Released in 2005 on Scarlet Records the album is based around the story of Joan of Arc (also known as Jeanne d'Arc). The album runs through her story beginning with her fate foretold by God, right up to her execution by burning at the stake.

== Track listing ==
All lyrics are written by Claudio Diprima; all music is composed by Giuseppe Bondi

No.	Title	Length
1.	"Revelations"	2:07
2.	"Maiden of Steel"	4:45
3.	"The Chosen"	6:03
4.	"Ride to Chignon"	4:30
5.	"...For The Orleans"	8:00
6.	"Up to the Battle"	5:21
7.	"March of the Brave"	1:04
8.	"The Rise of a King"	6:29
9.	"Siege of Paris"	6:22
10.	"Time to Die"	4:48
11.	"Inquisition"	1:36
12.	"The Trial"	9:08
