= Maidenhead (disambiguation) =

Maidenhead is a town in Berkshire in England.

Maidenhead may also refer to:

- Maidenhead (UK Parliament constituency)
- Royal Borough of Windsor and Maidenhead
- Maidenhead, New Jersey, the original name of Lawrenceville, New Jersey
- Maidenhead Township, New Jersey, the original name of Lawrence Township, Mercer County, New Jersey
- Maiden Head, a hamlet in the parish of Dundry in North Somerset, UK
- The Maidenhead Locator System
- An archaic reference to:
  - the hymen
  - virginity
