= St. Joan of Arc School =

St. Joan of Arc School may refer to:

== Elementary/Primary schools ==
- St. Joan of Arc School, Canton, OH
- St. Joan of Arc School, Evesham Township, New Jersey
- St. Joan of Arc School, Jackson Heights, Queens, NY

== High/Secondary schools ==
- St. Joan of Arc Catholic Academy, Scarborough, Ontario, Canada
- St Joan of Arc Catholic School, Rickmansworth, Herts., UK
- St. Joan of Arc High School, Barrie, Ontario, Canada see Simcoe Muskoka Catholic District School Board
- St. Joan of Arc Catholic Secondary School, Mississauga, Ontario, Canada
- St. Joan of Arc Catholic High School, Maple, Ontario, Canada
- St. Joan of Arc Secondary School, Hong Kong
