= Joen =

- Gender: Male

Origin
- Languages: Danish; Swedish
- Region of origin: Scandinavia

Joen is a given name. Notable people with the name include:

- Joen Bille (born 1944), Danish actor
- Joen Danielsen (1843–1926), Faroese poet and songwriter
- Joen Jacobsen (1714–1768), Norwegian master builder

== See also ==
- Joe (given name)
- Joel (given name)
