= The Chambermaid =

The Chambermaid may refer to:

- The Chambermaid (film), a 2018 Mexican film
- The Chambermaid on the Titanic, a 1997 French-Italian-Spanish drama film
- The Chambermaid Lynn, a 2014 German drama film starring Vicky Krieps
- Chambermaid (EP), by Emilie Autumn, 2001
- The Chambermaid's Daughter, a 2026 Philippine romantic comedy vertical series
