= Maiden's hair =

Maiden's hair or maidenhair may refer to:

- Maidenhair (painting), a 1974 tempura painting by American artist Andrew Wyeth
- Maidenhair fern, several ferns of the genus Adiantum
- Maidenhair moss (Fissidens adianthoides), a species of moss
- Maiden's hair plant, any of several green seaweeds:
  - Maiden's hair plant, several species of the genus Chlorodesmis
  - Maiden's hair plant, several species of the genus Caulerpa
- Maiden's hair tree or ginkgo (Ginkgo biloba)
- Maidenhair spleenwort (Asplenium trichomanes), a species of fern
- A woman's pubic hair
