= The Housemaid =

The Housemaid may refer to:

== Film ==
- The Housemaid (1960 film), a South Korean film
- The Housemaid (2010 film), a South Korean film
- The Housemaid (2016 film), a Vietnamese film
- The Housemaid (2025 film), an American film
- Housemaid, a 2026 Australian film by Louise Alston

== Literature ==
- The Housemaid: A Novel in Three Parts, a 1926 novel by British writer Naomi Royde-Smith
- The Housemaid, a 1998 novel by Ghanaian writer Amma Darko
- The Housemaid (novel), a 2022 novel by American writer Freida McFadden

== See also ==
- House servant
- Housemaid
- Housewife
