= The Maids (film) =

1975 British film directed by Christopher Miles

- Theatrical release poster
- Directed by: Christopher Miles
- Written by: Robert Enders; Christopher Miles
- Based on: The Maids (play) by Jean Genet
- Produced by: Robert Enders; Ely Landau
- Starring: Glenda Jackson; Susannah York; Vivien Merchant
- Cinematography: Douglas Slocombe
- Edited by: Peter Tanner
- Music by: Laurie Johnson
- Distributed by: American Film Theatre
- Release date: 21 April 1975 (U.S.)
- Running time: 95 minutes
- Country: United Kingdom
- Language: English

The Maids (French: Les Bonnes) is a 1975 British film that was directed by Christopher Miles. It is based on the play of the same title by the French dramatist Jean Genet. The film stars Glenda Jackson as Solange, Susannah York as Claire, Vivien Merchant as Madame, and Mark Burns as Monsieur. The film was produced by Ely Landau for the American Film Theatre, which presented thirteen film adaptations of plays in the United States from 1973 to 1975.

== Plot ==
Solange and Claire are two housemaids who construct elaborate sadomasochistic rituals when their mistress (Madame) is away. The focus of their role-playing is the murder of Madame, and they take turns portraying either side of the power divide. The deliberate pace and devotion to detail guarantees that they always fail to actualize their fantasies by ceremoniously "killing" Madame at the ritual's denouement.

The plot of the film was popularly believed to have been inspired by the murders committed in 1933 by Christine and Léa Papin, although this was denied by Genet. (Note: The story of the Papin sisters was filmed in 1995 as Sister My Sister, starring British actresses Joely Richardson, Jodhi May, and Julie Walters. The film was directed by Nancy Meckler and written by Wendy Kesselman. The case was also the subject of Murderous Maids (Les Blessures Assassines), a French film starring Sylvie Testud and Julie-Marie Parmentier and directed by Jean-Pierre Denis, released in 2000.)

== Cast ==
- Glenda Jackson as Solange
- Susannah York as Claire
- Vivien Merchant as Madame
- Mark Burns as Monsieur

== Production ==
Before it was filmed for the American Film Theatre, it ran as a stage play at the Greenwich Theatre, London, with the same principal cast later used for the film version. The director, Christopher Miles, planned the 12-day shoot with a single camera which could track anywhere over the set with the cinematographer Douglas Slocombe and deliberately implemented many of Genet's theatrical devices for the film. The camera was often static, the settings lush and extravagant.

== Release ==
The film was shown at the 1975 Cannes Film Festival, but was not entered into the main competition.
