= The Maid =

A maid is a female domestic servant employed for housekeeping.

The Maid(s) may refer to:

== Film and television ==
- The Maid, an Egyptian film starring Ashraf Fahmy
- The Maid (1991 film), an American film
- The Maid (2005 film), a Singaporean horror film
- The Maid (2009 film), a Chilean comedy-drama film
- The Maid (2020 film), a Thai horror film
- "The Maid" (Seinfeld), an episode of the American sitcom Seinfeld
- The Maids (film), a film adaptation of the play of the same name by the French dramatist Jean Genet

== Other uses ==
- The Maid, nickname for the Maid and Magpie Hotel in Adelaide, Australia
- The Maid (novel), a 2022 novel by Nita Prose
- The Maids (French: Les Bonnes), a play by the French dramatist Jean Genet
- Saint Joan of Arc (French: Sainte Jehanne d'Arc), patron saint of France, nicknamed "The Maid" (French: La Pucelle)

== See also ==
- La Pucelle (disambiguation) (French: The Maid)
- Maid (disambiguation)
