= St. Joan of Arc's Church (Bronx) =

Church building in New York City

Coordinates: 40°50′1″N 73°52′34″W

The Church of St. Joan of Arc

General information
- Location: The Bronx, New York City, United States
- Client: Roman Catholic Archdiocese of New York

The Church of St. Joan of Arc is a Roman Catholic parish church under the authority of the Roman Catholic Archdiocese of New York, located at 174th Street at Stratford Avenue, The Bronx, New York City.

== History ==
It was established in 1949. Francis Spellman dedicated the church in 1953. Father Henry T. Morton was the first Pastor when it was dedicated.

The Church held the funeral for middleweight boxer Willie Classen, a 29-year-old Bronx native, who died in November 1979 from brain injuries after being knocked out by Wilford Scypion at the Felt Forum. Infamously, the Classen funeral at St. Joan's Church was delayed by over two hours, due to a dispute by his manager, Marco Minuto, over the bill for the funeral home. The traumatic death lead to changes in Boxing rules, which included mandating an ambulance be present at boxing matches and the "Classen Rule", that a "fighter must make it out of his own corner, unaided, of his own volition". New York law now gives first priority ("preferred") to "reasonable funeral expenses", which avoids funeral-day wrangling between the family and friends of the deceased and the funeral directors.

In 2017, a mugger was targeting elderly women on their way to the Church, and snatching their purses.

In 2025, Father Adaly Rosado, a priest who had grown up in the South Bronx, returned as the priest in charge of St Joan of Arc Church, the parish of his youth. He was named "administrator" of the parish, a common title for a priest who takes care of a new parish, for one year before being appointed Pastor.

NYPD detective Anthony A. Sory was buried out of St Joan of Arc Church in 2026.
