= Saint Joan =

Saint Joan may refer to:

== People ==
- Joan of Arc (c. 1412–1431)
- Joanna, Princess of Portugal (1452–1490), beatified Portuguese royalty, known as the Princess Saint Joan in Portugal
- Joan of France, Duchess of Berry (1464–1505), Saint Joan of Valois
- Joan of Lestonnac (1556–1640), Saint Joanna of Toulouse, Jeanne de Lestonnac
- Saint Jeanne Delanoue (1666–1736)

== Film and theatre ==
- Saint Joan (play), by George Bernard Shaw
- Saint Joan (1957 film), adaptation directed by Otto Preminger
- Saint Joan (1967 film), a 1967 American TV film

== See also ==
- Saint Joan of Arc (disambiguation)
- Sant Joan (disambiguation)
- Saint Joanna
  - A "shade of Joanna," "saint Joanna," mentioned in Thomas Moore's parody poem "The Canonization of Saint Butterworth"
- saint Jane Frances de Chantal
- Joan (disambiguation)
