= La Pucelle =

La Pucelle may refer to:

- Gerard la Pucelle (circa 1117-1184), Roman Catholic bishop
- La Pucelle (saint) (circa 1412-1431), a.k.a. Joan of Arc, virgin saint and national heroine of France
- La Pucelle (ship), a fictional ship from Bernard Cornwell's novel Sharpe's Trafalgar
- La Pucelle: Tactics, a 2002 tactical role-playing videogame
- La Pucelle (violin), a.k.a. The Virgin, a 1709 violin made by Antonio Stradivari

== See also ==
- Jean Pucelle (1300–1355), Parisian manuscript illuminator
- Joan la Pucelle, Shakespearean character, his version of Joan of Arc from Henry VI
- The Maid (disambiguation) (French: La Pucelle)
- Maiden (disambiguation) (French: Pucelle)
- Maid (disambiguation) (French: Pucelle)
- Virgin (disambiguation) (French: Pucelle)
