= Equestrian statue of Joan of Arc =

Equestrian statue of Joan of Arc may refer to:

- Jeanne d'Arc (Paris), an equestrian sculpture of Joan of Arc by Emmanuel Frémiet, 1874
  - Equestrian statue of Joan of Arc (Portland, Oregon), a 1925 copy
- Equestrian statue of Joan of Arc (Paris), by Paul Dubois, 1889
  - Equestrian statue of Joan of Arc (Washington, D.C.), a 1922 copy
- Equestrian statue of Joan of Arc (New York City), by Anna Hyatt Huntington, 1915
- Equestrian statue of Joan of Arc (Basilica of Sacré-Cœur) by Hippolyte Lefèbvre, 1927
