= Joan (surname) =

Joan is the surname of:

- Bernat Joan i Marí (born 1960), Catalan politician
- Joel Joan (born 1970), Catalan actor, scriptwriter and director
- Martí Joan de Galba (died 1490), co-author of the Catalan epic Tirant lo Blanc

== See also ==
- Josep Tarradellas i Joan (1899–1988), Catalan politician
