= Maids (graphic novel) =

2020 graphic novel by Katie Skelly

First edition

Maids is a 2020 biographical graphic novel by Katie Skelly. It is about Christine and Léa Papin's 1933 murders of Genevieve and Léonie Lancelin, and was published by Fantagraphics.

== Synopsis ==
The graphic novel opens with Léa's arrival at the Lancelin household, where she had been hired as a maid. Her sister, Christine, already worked there. She soon finds that Christine has been stealing small things from their employer, but this is quickly overshadowed by the long hours and physical abuse the siblings are subject to. After Léa has a mental breakdown, the two young women gouge out the eyes of and murder Léonie Lancelin and her daughter Genevieve.

== Critical reception ==
Library Journal wrote that Skelly skillfully showed the close, complicated connection between the siblings in a sympathetic way. Publishers Weekly's review focused on the melding of femininity and horror within the book's art style, but noted the undercurrent of class and gender analysis within the story. NPR also noted the themes around power, gender, and sexuality.
