= Christine and Léa Papin =

French sisters sentenced for a February 1933 murder

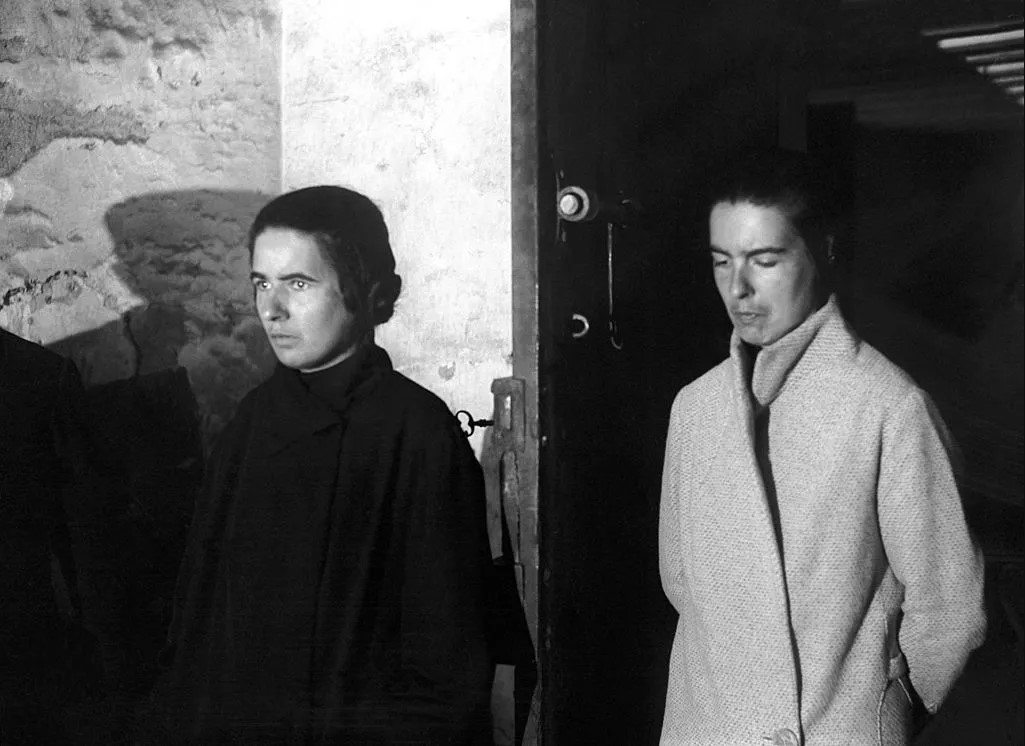
Léa (left) and Christine Papin

Christine Papin (8 March 1905 – 18 May 1937) and Léa Papin (15 September 1911 – either 1982 or 2001) were two French sisters who, as live-in maids, were convicted of murdering their employer's wife and daughter in Le Mans on February 2, 1933.

The case formed the basis of publications, plays, and films, as well as essays, spoken word, songs, and artwork.

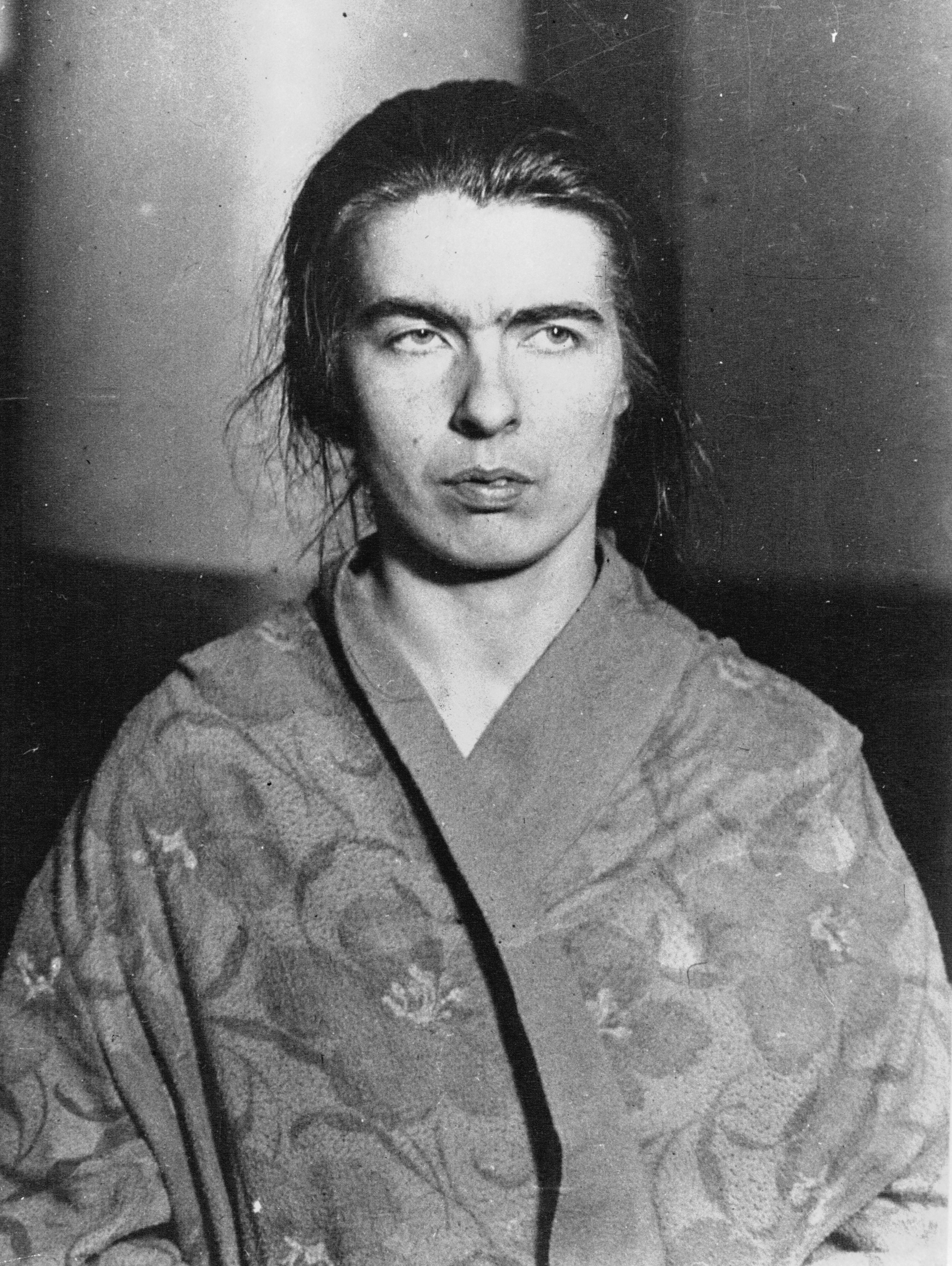
Christine Papin in 1933

== Early life ==
Christine and Léa Papin were born in Le Mans to Clémence Derré and Gustave Papin. While Clémence was dating Gustave, it was rumored that she was having an affair with her employer. However, after she became pregnant, Gustave married her in October 1901. Five months later, her first daughter, Émilia, was born.

Suspecting that Clémence was still having an affair with her employer, Gustave found a new job in another city and announced that the family would move. Clémence declared that she would rather take her own life than leave Le Mans. The marriage deteriorated. Gustave began to drink heavily.

Christine was born on March 8, 1905, but her mother was considered not to be nurturing and deemed unsuitable for motherhood, and soon after her birth Christine was given to her paternal aunt and uncle. She lived happily with them for seven years.

Léa was born on September 15, 1911 and given to her maternal uncle, with whom she remained until he died. In 1912, when eldest sister Émilia was 9 or 10 years old, it was alleged that Gustave had raped her. Clémence, believing that Émilia had seduced her father, sent her to the Bon Pasteur Catholic Orphanage, which was known for its discipline. Soon afterward, Émilia was joined by Christine and Léa, who Clémence intended would remain at the orphanage until age 15, when they could be employed. Clémence and Gustave divorced in 1913.

In 1918, Émilia decided to enter a convent, effectively ending her relations with her family. As far as can be ascertained, she lived out the remainder of her life there. During Christine's time at the orphanage, she also expressed the desire to become a nun. Clémence forbade this, instead placing her in employment. Christine had been trained in various household duties in the orphanage, which eased her into becoming a live-in maid.

Christine was described as a hard worker and a good cook who could be insubordinate at times. Léa was described as quiet, introverted, and obedient, but was considered less intelligent than Christine. Employers were content with their work, but Clémence was not satisfied with their pay and forced them to seek better-paid opportunities. The sisters worked as maids in various Le Mans homes. They preferred to work together whenever possible.

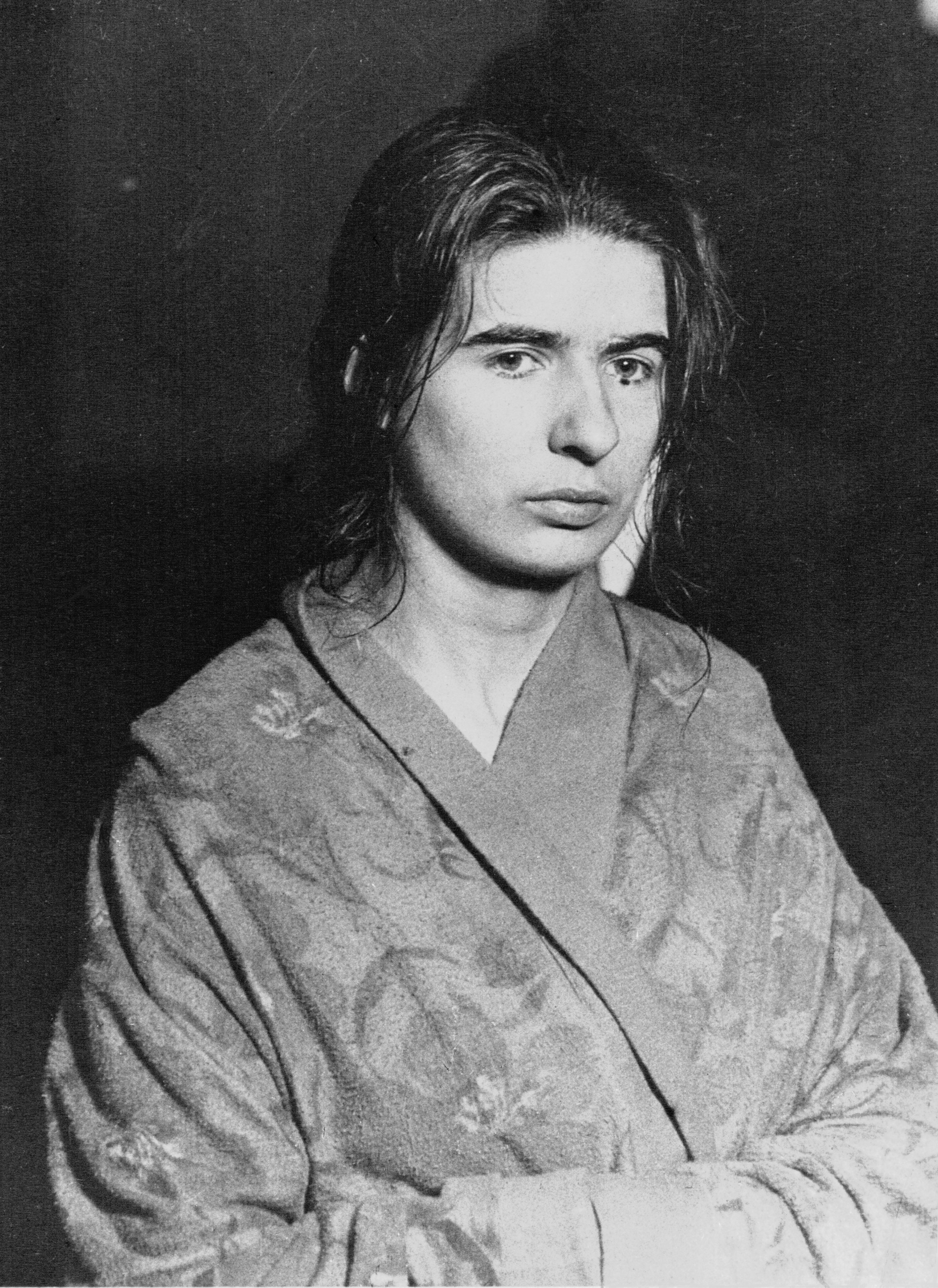
Léa Papin

== Crimes ==
In 1926, Christine and Léa found live-in positions as maids at 6 rue Bruyère for the Lancelin family; Monsieur René Lancelin, a retired solicitor, his wife Madame Léonie Lancelin, and their younger daughter Genevieve lived in the house (the elder daughter was married). Although initially only Christine was employed, after a few months of excellent service she convinced Madame Lancelin to also hire Léa as a chambermaid. The Papin sisters dedicated their lives to working long days doing their job.

Some years after Christine and Léa started working for the family, Madame Léonie developed depression. She deteriorated, not handling her struggles well; targeting of the Papins developed as her unhealthy coping mechanism. She began to scrutinize the cleaning, becoming critical of the quality of the job being done. There were various occasions of Madame Lancelin reportedly physically assaulting the sisters. The abuse worsened: at its peak she would slam the sisters' heads against the wall.

On the evening of Thursday, February 2, 1933, Monsieur Lancelin was supposed to meet Madame Léonie and Genevieve for dinner at the home of a family friend. Madame Léonie and Genevieve had been out shopping that day. When they returned home that afternoon, no lights were on in the house. The Papin sisters explained to Madame Lancelin that the power outage had been caused by Christine plugging in a faulty iron. Madame Lancelin became irritated and attacked the sisters on the first-floor landing. Christine lunged at Genevieve and gouged her eyes out. Léa joined in the struggle and attacked Madame Lancelin, gouging her eyes out as ordered by Christine. Christine ran downstairs to the kitchen where she retrieved a knife and a hammer. She brought both weapons upstairs, where the sisters continued hitting the Lancelin women, slashing and bludgeoning them. At some point, one of the sisters grabbed a heavy pewter pitcher and used it to strike the heads of both Lancelin women. In the midst of the rage, they mutilated the buttocks and thighs of the victims.

Some time later, Monsieur Lancelin returned home to find the house dark. He assumed that his wife and daughter had left for the dinner party and proceeded to the party himself. When he arrived at his friend's home, he found that his family was not there. He returned to his residence with his son-in-law at approximately 18:30 or 19:00, where they discovered the entire house still dark except for a light in the Papin sisters' room. The front door was bolted shut from the inside, so they were unable to enter the house. The two men found this suspicious and went to a local police station to summon help from an officer. Together with the policeman, they returned to the Lancelin home where the policeman made entry into the home by climbing over the garden wall.

Once inside, he found the bodies of Madame Lancelin and her daughter Genevieve. They had both been bludgeoned and stabbed to the point of being unrecognizable. Madame Lancelin's eyes had been gouged out and were found in the folds of the scarf around her neck, and one of Genevieve's eyes was found under her body and another on the stairs at the other end of the hallway. Thinking that the Papin sisters had met the same fate, the policeman continued upstairs only to find the door to the Papin sisters' room locked.

After the officer knocked but received no response, he summoned a locksmith to open the door. Inside the room, he found the Papin sisters naked in bed together, and a bloody hammer, with hair still clinging to it, on a chair nearby. Under questioning, the sisters immediately confessed to the killing.

=== Trial and imprisonment ===
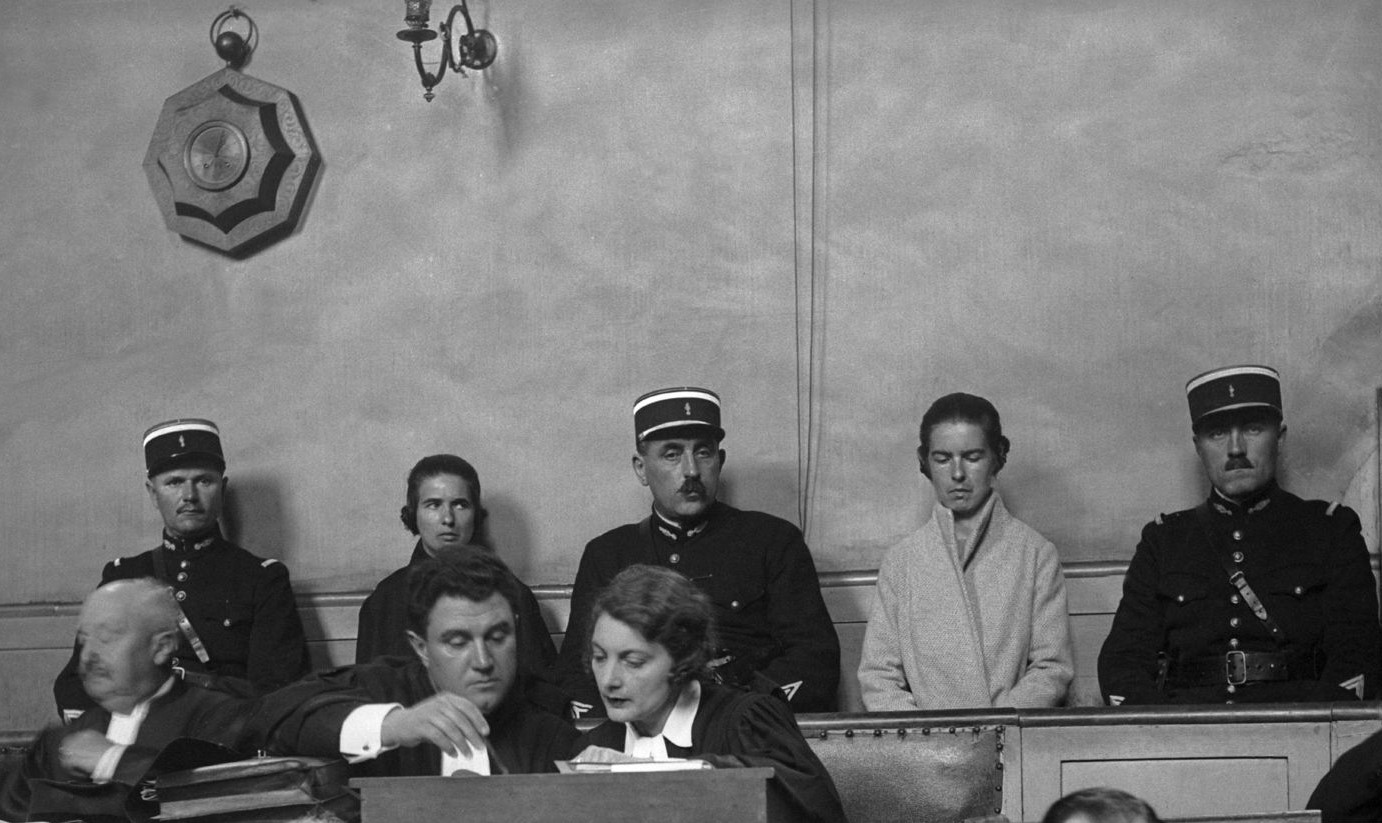
The sisters during their trial in 1933

The sisters claimed that the murders had been committed in self-defense. During the trial, the sisters protected each other and each confessed sole responsibility for the crimes committed. The sisters were placed in prison and separated from each other.

Christine became extremely distressed because she could not see Léa. At one point, prison officials relented and allowed the two sisters to meet. Christine reportedly threw herself at Léa, unbuttoning her blouse, begging her "Please, say yes!" suggesting an incestuous sexual relationship.

In July 1933, Christine experienced a "fit", or episode, in which she tried to gouge her own eyes out and had to be put in a straitjacket. She then made a statement to the investigating magistrate, in which she said that on the day of the murders she had experienced an episode like the one she just had in prison and that this was what precipitated the murders.

The sisters' chosen lawyer pleaded not guilty by reason of insanity on behalf of them. Christine and Léa demonstrated signs of mental illness such as limiting eye contact and staring straight ahead appearing to be in a daze. The court appointed three doctors to administer psychological evaluations of the sisters to determine their mental state. They concluded that the two had no mental disorders and deemed them sane and fit to stand trial. They also believed that Christine's affection for her sister was based on family ties, not an incestuous relationship as others had suggested.

However, during the September 1933 trial, medical testimony noted a history of mental illness in the family. Their uncle had died by suicide, while their cousin was living in an asylum. The psychological community struggled and debated over a diagnosis for the sisters.

After much consideration, it was concluded that Christine and Léa suffered from shared paranoid disorder, otherwise known as folie à deux, which is believed to occur when groups or pairs of people are isolated from the world, developing paranoia, and in which one partner dominates the other. This was especially true of Léa, whose meek personality was overshadowed by the obstinate and dominant Christine.

After the trial, jurors took 40 minutes to determine that the Papin sisters were indeed guilty of the crime of which they had been accused. Léa, thought to be under the influence of her older sister, was given a 10-year sentence. Christine was initially sentenced to death at the guillotine, although that sentence was later commuted to life imprisonment.

== Deaths ==
The separation from Léa proved to be too much for Christine. Her condition deteriorated rapidly once they were apart. She had written various letters pleading to be with Léa; however, her wish was not to be granted. She experienced bouts of depression and "madness", eventually refusing to eat. Prison officials transferred her to a mental institution in Rennes, hoping that she would benefit from professional help. Still separated from Léa, she continued to starve herself until she died of cachexia (wasting away) on May 18, 1937.

Léa fared better than Christine, serving only eight years of her 10-year sentence due to good behavior in prison. After her release in 1941, she lived in the town of Nantes, where she was joined by her mother. She assumed a false identity and earned a living as a hotel maid.

Some accounts state that Léa died in 1982, but French film producer Claude Ventura alleged Léa was living in a hospice center in France in 2000 while creating the film En Quête des Soeurs Papin (in English, In Search of the Papin Sisters). In the film, Ventura interviews neighbours of the alleged Papin sister, who said she had suffered a stroke that had rendered her partially paralyzed and unable to speak. This woman died in 2001.

The sisters are buried together in the Cimetière La Bouteillerie in Nantes.

== Works inspired by the case ==
=== Les Bonnes by Jean Genet ===
The play Les Bonnes (English: The Maids) by French writer Jean Genet often is thought to be based on the Papin sisters, although Genet said this was not the case. However, the play deals with the plight of two French maids who resemble the Papin sisters, and highlights the dissatisfaction of the maids with their lot in life, which manifests itself in a hatred for their mistress. Genet's interest in the crime of the Papin sisters stemmed at least partly from his contempt for the middle classes, along with his understanding of how a murderer could glory in the infamy that came from their crime.

=== Other works ===
- The Maids, a film based on Jean Genet's play, directed by Christopher Miles
- My Sister in This House, a play by Wendy Kesselman
- Sister My Sister, a 1994 film by Nancy Meckler, adapted from Kesselman's play
- Les Abysses, a film directed by Nikos Papatakis
- La Cérémonie, a film directed by Claude Chabrol
- Violets, a 2015 short film directed by Jim Vendiola
- Les Soeurs Papin, a book by R. le Texier
- Blood Sisters, a stage play and screenplay by Neil Paton
- L'Affaire Papin, a book by Paulette Houdyer
- La Solution du passage à l'acte, a book by Francis Dupré
- "The Murder in Le Mans", an essay in Paris Was Yesterday by Janet Flanner
- La Ligature, a short film by Gilles Cousin
- Les Meurtres par Procuration, a book by Jean-Claude Asfour
- Lady Killers, a book by Joyce Robins
- Minotaure #3, 1933, a magazine
- The Maids, an opera by Peter Bengtson
- Les Blessures assassines (English: Murderous Maids), a film by Jean-Pierre Denis
- En Quete des Soeurs Papin (In Search of the Papin Sisters), a documentary film by Claude Ventura
- Gros Proces des l'Histoire, a book by M. Mamouni
- L'Affaire Papin, a book by Genevieve Fortin
- The Papin Sisters, a book by Rachel Edwards and Keith Reader
- The Maids, artwork by Dame Paula Rego
- Anna la bonne, a 1934 "spoken song" written by Jean Cocteau and performed by Marianne Oswald. This was inspired by Poe's Annabel Lee rather than the Papin case, but it influences Genet's "Les Bonnes".
- Deadly Women (Double Trouble)
- Maids, a comic by Katie Skelly
- Parasite, a film directed by Bong Joon Ho, who co-wrote the screenplay with Han Jin-won

== See also ==
- Case of Aimée
- Popular Front (France), for more on the political climate of the times.

== Bibliography ==
- Dupré, Francis (1984). La "solution" du passage à l'acte [The "Solution" of Acting Out] (in French). Paris: Éditions Érès. ISBN 978-2-86586-024-1.
- Edwards, Rachel; Reader, Keith (1984). The Papin Sisters. Oxford Studies in Modern European Culture. Oxford University Press. ISBN 978-0-19-816010-6.
- Hall, Angus, ed. (1976). "The Maids of Horror". Crimes of Horror (1st ed.). Great Britain: The Hamlyn Publishing Group Limited. pp. 148–155. ISBN 1-85051-170-5.
