= A Slight Ache =

1961 play written by Harold Pinter

First edition cover

A Slight Ache is a tragicomic play written by Harold Pinter in 1958 and first published by Methuen in London in 1961. It concerns a married couple's dreams and desires, focusing mostly on the husband's fears of the unknown, of growing old, and of the "Other" as a threat to his self-identity.

== Characters ==
- Edward
- Flora
- A match seller

== Themes ==
One of the main themes involves one's insecurity about threats to one's self-identity embodied in the character of the matchseller, of whom one of the other two characters, Edward, is utterly terrified. The theme of growing old is also prevalent: according to Edward, the Matchseller is old, practically stone deaf, and has a glass eye, and the middle-aged Edward and Flora continually reminisce about their youth throughout the play. Threat of the "Other" and obsessive romantic jealousy are also recurrent.

== Productions ==
A Slight Ache premièred as a radio broadcast in 1959, prior to its first stage production. On radio, because the Matchseller does not speak in the play, he appeared to its audience to be a figment of Edward's imagination. The play has subsequently enjoyed a number of successful stage productions. In 2008 it was performed at the National Theatre, starring Simon Russell Beale and Clare Higgins, and directed by Iqbal Khan. The character of the matchseller appeared on the stage, played by Jamie Beamish.
