= Sainte Jeanne d'Arc Church (Besançon) =

Catholic church in Besançon, France

Coordinates: 47.2388°N 6.03708°E

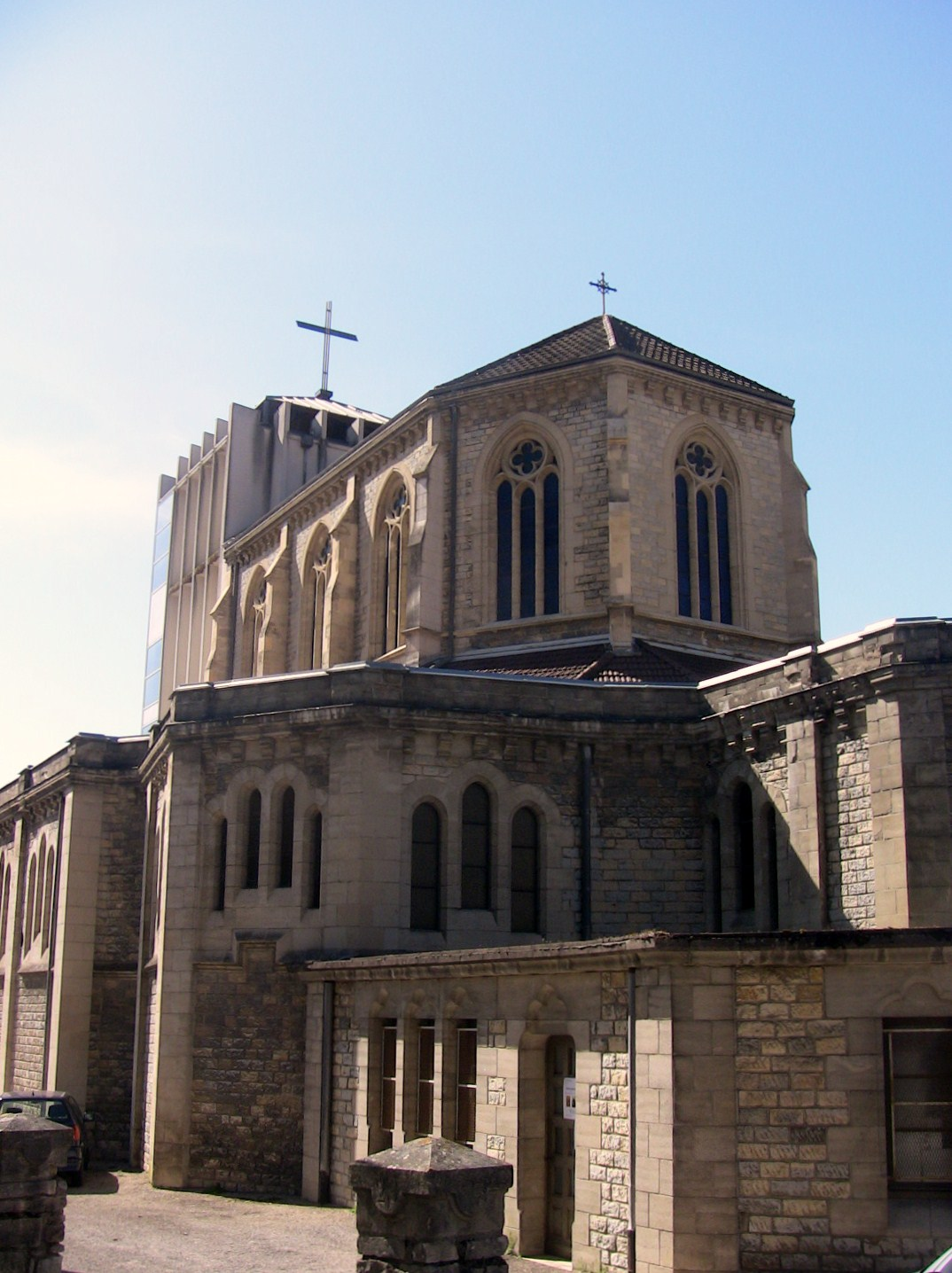
Sainte Jeanne d'Arc Church of Besançon (Doubs, France)

Sainte-Jeanne-d'Arc is a Catholic church located in the French city of Besançon, in the department of Doubs.

== History ==
The first church in the neighborhood of Bregille was the Church of Saint Martin which was constructed in the sixth century. The Church of Saint Martin was renovated multiple times before finally being destroyed in 1814. During the siege of Besançon by the army of Liechtenstein, French General Jacob François Marulaz made the controversial decision to completely raze the Bregille area, including the church and the cemetery next to it. Bregille went without a church for almost a century.

In 1901, the archbishop of Besançon, Fulbert Petit, established a chapel in an abandoned factory. It was closed soon after in 1902 by the prefect of Doubs, but was reestablished as a site of worship in 1906.

Lucine Bourriot, a resident of Bregille, bought the land where Sainte-Jeanne-d'Arc is today in 1914. The parish priest of Saint-Lin, Abbot Quinnez, was charged by the archbishop of Besançon Joseph-Marie-Louis Humbrecht to dedicate a building to Joan of Arc. Construction of the church began in 1930, in Bregille. The choir was completed in 1933 but work on the rest of the building was terminated, not to resume until 1948. Mr. Dumas, a Swiss architect, drew up a new plan of the steeple (31 meters high), and the building took on a Gothic Revival architecture style. The church was officially consecrated in 1961 by Marcel-Marie Dubois.

In 2002, the church was renovated and the bell was finally installed. In 2006, rooms were made available for the use of Orthodox Christians.

== See also ==
- Besançon
- Besançon Cathedral
