= Nine maidens (mythology) =

Archetype in mythology

Many cultures around the world have stories about groups of nine women. In Great Britain they occur in a variety of situations. In Scotland there are references to Nine Maidens, purportedly a group of, and there were a number of wells dedicated to them, but like all similar groupings would appear to have had their origin in pre-Christian times. In Arthurian material, the best known of these groups are the Nine sorceresses, Morgan and her sisters who live on the Isle of Avalon and are both seeresses and healers. Another group occur in the Welsh tale of Peredur son of Efrawg, and these are the armed witches of Caer Loyw. Also in Welsh mythology, we have nine maidens who tend the fire below the Cauldron of the "Chief of Annwn"; this cauldron is the target of Arthur’s raid on the Underworld in Taliesin’s famous poem Preiddeu Annwfn.

== Iceland ==
Groups of Nine Maidens crop up in the Icelandic tales of Thidrandi and in Brand’s saga, in the story of Svipdagr, as Valkyries and as the daughters of the sea goddess Rán.

== Norse mythology ==
In Norse mythology, the watcher god of Valhalla, Heimdallr is said to be born of nine mothers, and they are also associated with the World-Mill which created the known universe from the bodies of the Ice Giants slain by Odin and his companions.

The sea-god Njörðr and the jotun Ægir (whose domain is also the sea) each have nine daughters.

== England ==
The Anglo-Saxon Charm Against a Kernel refers to a character called Noðþe with nine sisters.

== Ireland ==
An echo of the daughters of Rán appears in the Irish tale of Ruad, Son of Rig-Donn, in which he is stopped at sea by nine giant maidens with whom he has a child.

In Ireland, the attendants at St Brigid’s sacred fire at Kildare are sometimes said to be nine, though sometimes nineteen. Brigid also is said to have gone to Scotland with Nine Maidens to found Abernethy, just as Monenna is said to have come from Ireland with nine female companions. Stories about St Brigid appear to have some similar elements with those of an earlier goddess figure Brìde, who was also indigenous to Scotland and may well have been the tutelary goddess of the Brigantes in North West England.

Beyond Britain, the nine occur in the Breton story of the Korrigan, who along with her nine attendants lured unwary men to their deaths and in the tradition of the Gallicenae; the Nine Maidens who lived on the Isle du Sein, latterly known as the Isle of the Druidesses.

== Greek mythology ==
In Greek mythology, the Muses were originally thought to have been a whole series of different groups who, like their counterparts in Scotland, are associated with mountains and wells.

== Kenya ==
In Kenya, the Kikuyu people claim descent from nine sisters who, like many other such groupings, are associated with a mountain – Mount Kenya, the native name is 'kirínyaga' - and a single powerful male figure. It is believed that Mumbi and Gikuyu had 9 daughters namely, Wanjirũ, Wambũi, wanjeri also known as wacera, Wanjikũ, Nyambũra, Wairimũ, Waithĩra, Wangarĩ, and Wangũi.

== Female figures linked to groups of nine women ==
Brìde – goddess in England, Ireland and Scotland.

Cailleach – The Winter Hag aspect of the Mother Goddess in Scotland. Similarly known in Ireland

Cerridwen – the Welsh Goddess who had a cauldron of poetry and inspiration

Monenna – an early Scottish saint who supposedly had chapels on Dumbarton, Edinburgh and Stirling Rocks, and Traprain Law – all important Dark Age sites.

Morgan - the leader of the nine sisters of Avalon linked to King Arthur.

Rán - Norse goddess of the sea

== Male figures associated with groups of nine women ==
- Apollo - Sun god of the ancient Greeks who was said to have had a temple in Hyperborea – theel and beyond the north wind. This temple has been located by commentators at Calanais and Stonehenge. Apollo was the leader and lover of the nine Muses.
- King Arthur – the legendary sub-Roman British king whose tales find mixed origins in historic accounts and oral traditions, later elaborated on by medieval writers.
- Gikuyu - traditional founder of the Kikuyu people of Kenya.
- Heimdallr – the watcher god of Asgard and the originator of social classes.
- Njörðr - god of the sea.
- Ægir - sea-jotun in Norse myth.
- Donald of Ogilvy - Scottish Saint, had 9 virgin daughters, his feast day is 15 July.
