= Joan =

Joan may refer to:

== People and fictional characters ==
- Joan (given name), including a list of women, men and fictional characters
  - Joan of Arc (c. 1412–1431), patron saint of France
- Joan (surname)
- Jōan (era), a Japanese era name

== Arts and entertainment ==
=== Music ===
- Joan (album), a 1967 album by Joan Baez
- Joan (band), an American duo formed in 2017
- "Joan", a song by The Art Bears from their 1978 album Hopes and Fears
- "Joan", a song by Lene Lovich from her 1980 album Flex
- "Joan", a song by Erasure from their 1991 album Chorus
- "Joan", a song by The Innocence Mission from their 1991 album Umbrella
- "Joan", a song by God Is My Co-Pilot from their 1992 album I Am Not This Body

=== Other arts and entertainment ===
- Joan (collection), a fashion collection by Alexander McQueen
- Joan (play), a 2015 one-woman play
- Joan (rock opera), a 1975 rock opera
- Joan (TV series), a 2024 British crime drama

== Other uses ==
- Joan Township, Ontario, Canada
- List of storms named Joan, multiple tropical cyclones

== See also ==
- Jo-an tea house, a National Treasure in Inuyama, Aichi Prefecture, Japan
- Jone (disambiguation)
- Joen, a list of people with the given name
