= Sainte Jeanne d'Arc Church, Nice =

Church in Nice, France

Church of Saint Joan of Arc
- Sainte Jeanne d'Arc (French)
- Façade of the church

Religion
- Affiliation: Roman Catholic
- Diocese: Diocese of Nice
- Province: Archdiocese of Marseille
- Ecclesiastical or organisational status: Parish church
- Leadership: P. Guy Largillière

Location
- Location: Nice, France
- Interactive map of Church of Saint Joan of Arc
- Coordinates: 43°42′48.28″N 7°15′45.36″E

Architecture
- Architects: Louis Castel, Jacques Droz
- Type: Church
- Style: Art deco
- Groundbreaking: 1914 (crypt)
- Completed: 1934

Specifications
- Length: 59 m (194 ft)
- Width: 43 m (141 ft)
- Height (max): Nave: 25 m (82 ft); Steeple: 64 m (210 ft)
- Materials: Reinforced concrete
- Monument historique
- Official name: Église Sainte-Jeanne d'Arc
- Designated: 12 June 1992
- Reference no.: PA00080940
- Denomination: Église

Website
- nice.cef.fr

The Church of Saint Joan of Arc (French: Sainte Jeanne d'Arc) is a Roman Catholic parish church located in Nice, France. Noticeable for its original architecture, the church is dedicated to Joan of Arc.

The style of this church is controversial among the inhabitants of Nice, judged ugly by some. The church is sometime nicknamed "the Meringue" for its white color.

== History ==
In 1914, Father Quillery was appointed parish priest of the new parish of Saint Jérome. The first projects for a new church are proposed. French architect Louis Castel initiated in 1914 its construction and built a crypt. After World War I, another French architect Jacques Droz constructed in 1924 a second crypt. Both crypts are the support of the new building. In 1931 a concrete basement is laid over the two crypts. Between 1932 and 1934, the church was built using reinforced concrete. Droz employed the technique of the thin shell concrete for the domes that have a thickness of 45 centimetres (18 in) at the base but only 8 centimetres (3.1 in) at the top.

== Architecture ==
The use of reinforced concrete, a new material at that time, allowed an original construction in a style influenced by Art Deco. Eight ellipsoidal domes support three larger ovoid domes. In the interior, these three large domes are only supported by four pillars, which allows an astonishing interior volume with 25 metres (82 ft) high vaults. The angular form of the 64 metres (210 ft) steeple is in opposition with the strong curves of the domes.

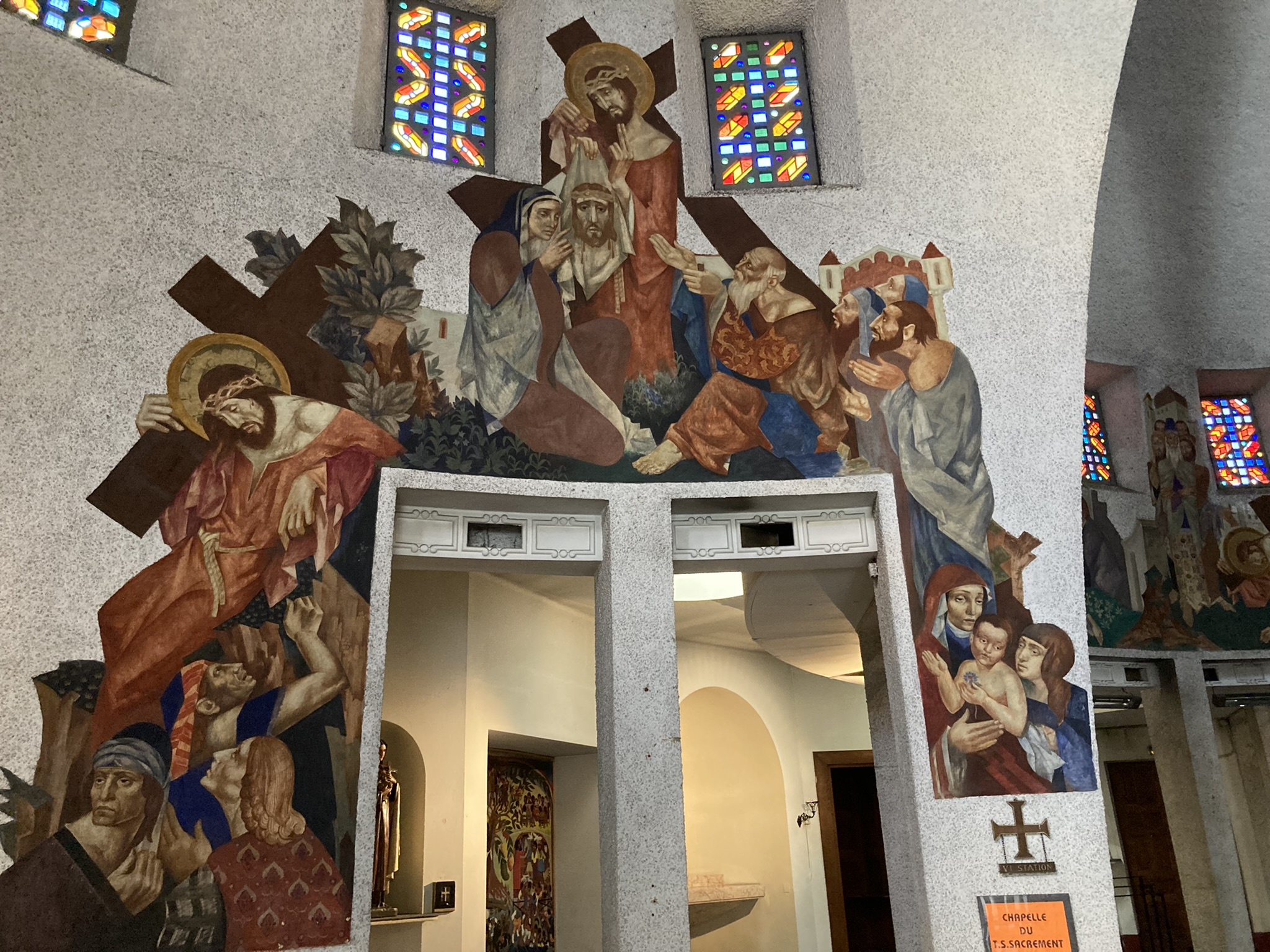
One of the frescoes of Eugène Klementieff

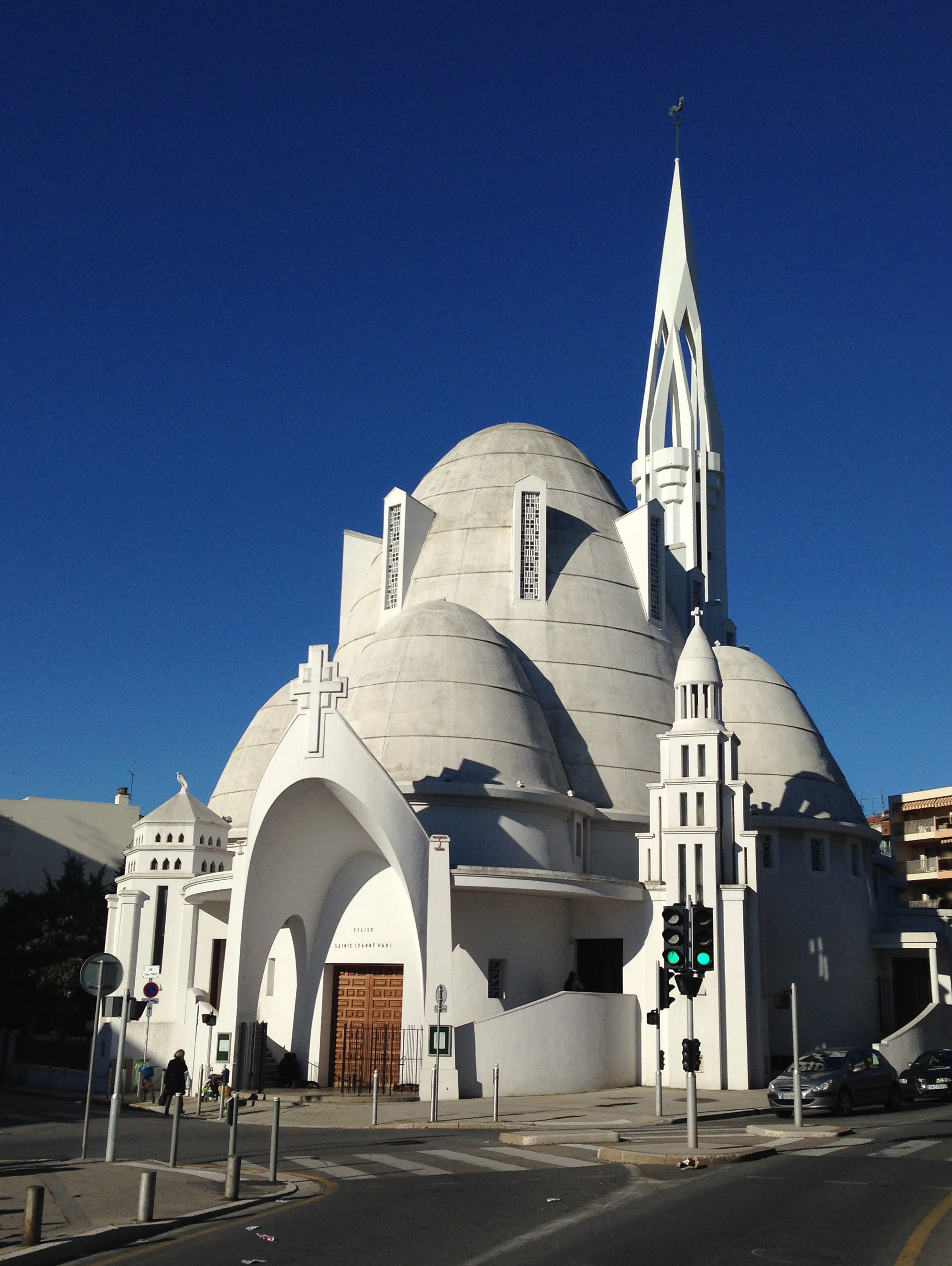
Exterior view of the church

The 95 m^{2} (1,020 sq ft) fresco paintings of the stations of the Cross were executed by Eugène Klementieff in 1934. The paintings are influenced by Russian Cubism, Italian Quattrocento and Byzantine Orthodox icons.
