= Canonization of Joan of Arc =

Mass of granting sainthood to Joan of Arc

Saint Joan of Arc
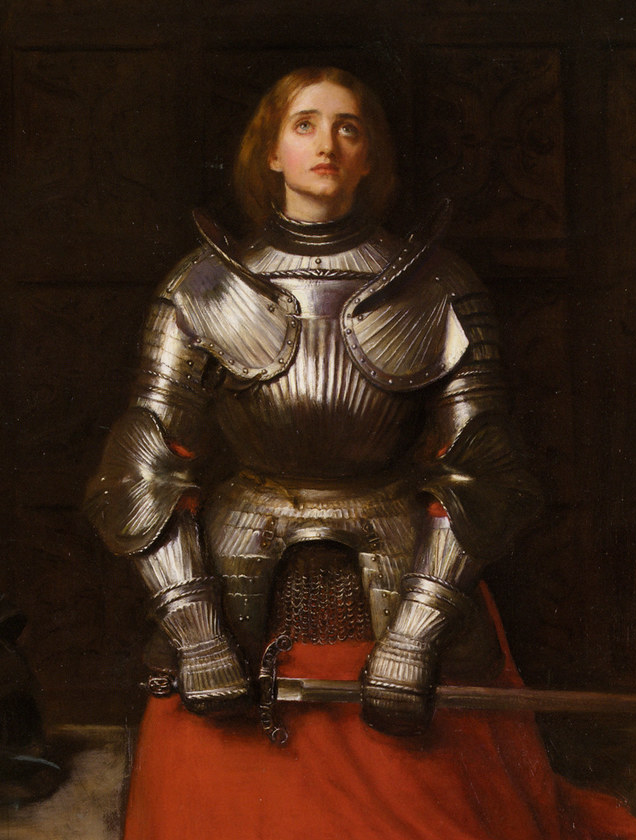

Virgin
- Born: 6 January, c. 1412; Domrémy, Duchy of Bar, France.
- Died: 30 May 1431 (aged c. 19); Rouen, Normandy (then under English rule)
- Venerated in: Roman Catholic Church; Anglican Communion
- Beatified: 18 April 1909, St. Peter's Basilica by Pope Pius X
- Canonized: 16 May 1920, St. Peter's Basilica by Pope Benedict XV
- Feast: 30 May
- Parent(s): Jacques d'Arc; Isabelle de Vouthon
- Patronage: France

Canonization Mass of Joan of Arc in Saint Peter's Basilica.

Joan of Arc (1412–1431) was formally canonized as a saint of the Roman Catholic Church on 16 May 1920 by Pope Benedict XV in his bull Divina disponente, which concluded the canonization process that the Sacred Congregation of Rites instigated after a petition of 1869 of the French Catholic hierarchy. Although pro-English clergy had Joan burnt at the stake for heresy in 1431, she was rehabilitated in 1456 after a posthumous retrial. Subsequently, she became a folk saint among French Catholics and soldiers inspired by her story of being commanded by God to fight for France against England. Many French regimes encouraged her cult, and the Third Republic was sympathetic to the canonization petition prior to the 1905 separation of church and state.

== Path to sainthood ==
=== Death and 15th century ===
As with other saints who were excommunicated or investigated by ecclesiastic courts, such as Athanasius, Teresa of Ávila, and John of the Cross, Joan was put on trial by an Inquisitorial court. In her case, the court was influenced by the English, which occupied northern France, leading to her execution in the marketplace of Rouen. When the French retook Rouen in 1449, a series of investigations were launched. Her now-widowed mother Isabelle Romée and Joan's brothers Jéan and Pierre, who were with Joan at the Siege of Orléans, petitioned Pope Nicholas V to reopen her case. The formal appeal was conducted in 1455 by Jean Bréhal, Inquisitor-General of France, under the aegis of Pope Callixtus III. Isabelle addressed the opening session of the appellate trial at Notre Dame with an impassioned plea to clear her daughter's name. Joan was exonerated on 7 July 1456, with Bréhal's summary of case evidence describing her as being executed by a court which itself had violated Church law.

The city of Orléans had commemorated her death each year beginning in 1432, and from 1435 onward performed a religious play centered on the lifting of the siege. The play represented her as a divinely-sent savior guided by angels. In 1452, during one of the postwar investigations into her execution, Cardinal d'Estouteville declared that this play would merit qualification as a pilgrimage site by which attendees could gain an indulgence.

Not long after the appeal, Pope Pius II, who died in 1464, wrote an approving piece about her in his memoirs.

=== 16th century ===
An anonymous author wrote a biography of Joan's life, stating that it was compiled "By order of the King, Louis XII of that name" in circa 1500.

=== 18th and 19th centuries ===
Joan's cult of personality was opposed by the leaders of the French Revolution as she was a devout Catholic who had served the monarchy. They banned the yearly celebration of the lifting of the Siege of Orléans, and Joan's relics, including her sword and banner, were destroyed. A statue of Joan erected by the people of Orléans in 1571 (to replace one destroyed by Protestants in 1568) was melted down and made into a cannon.

Recognizing he could use Joan for his nationalist purposes, Napoleon allowed Orléans to resume its yearly celebration of the lifting of the siege, commissioned Augustin Dupré to strike a commemorative coin, and had Jean-Antoine Chaptal inform the mayor of Orléans that he approved of a resolution by the municipal council for Edme-François-Étienne Gois to erect his statue of Joan:

"The illustrious career of Joan of Arc proves that there is no miracle French genius cannot perform in the face of a threat against national freedom."

Gois's work was relocated to Place Dauphiné in 1855, replaced with a statue of Joan by Denis Foyatier.

Although Nicolas Lenglet Du Fresnoy and Clément Charles François de Laverdy are credited with the first full-length biographies of Joan, several English authors ironically sparked a movement which led to her canonization. Harvard University English literature professor Herschel Baker noted in his introduction to Henry VI for The Riverside Shakespeare how appalled William Warburton was by the depiction of Joan in Henry VI, Part 1, and that Edmond Malone sought in "Dissertation on the Three Parts of Henry VI" (1787) to prove Shakespeare had no hand in its authorship (1974; p. 587). Charles Lamb chided Samuel Taylor Coleridge for reducing Joan to "a pot girl" in the first drafts of The Destiny of Nations, initially part of Robert Southey's Joan of Arc. She was the subject of essays by Lord Mahon for The Quarterly Review, and by Thomas De Quincey for Tait's. In 1890, the Joan of Arc Church was dedicated to her.

As Joan found her way further into popular culture, the Government of France commissioned Emmanuel Frémiet to erect a statue of her in the Place des Pyramides—the only public commission of the state from 1870 to 1914. The French Navy dedicated four vessels to her: a 52-gun frigate (1820); a 42-gun frigate (1852); an ironclad corvette warship (1867); and an armored cruiser (1899). Philippe-Alexandre Le Brun de Charmettes's biography (1817), and Jules Quicherat's account of her trial and rehabilitation (1841–1849) seemed to have inspired canonization efforts.

In 1869, to celebrate the 440th anniversary of the lifting of the Siege, Félix Dupanloup, Bishop of Orléans, delivered a second panegyric on Joan, attended by: Jean-François-Anne Landriot; Guillaume-René Meignan; Georges Darboy; Joseph-Alfred Foulon; Henri-Marie-Gaston Boisnormand de Bonnechose; Louis-Édouard-François-Desiré Pie; Joseph-Hippolyte Guibert; Charles Lavigerie; Charles-Amable de La Tour d'Auvergne-Lauraguais, Bishop of Bourges; Félix-Joseph-François-Barthélemy de Las Cases, Bishop of Constantine; Joseph-Armand Gignoux, Bishop of Beauvais; Louis-Marie-Joseph-Eusèbe, Bishop of Saint-Dié; Louis-Théophile Pallu du Parc, Bishop of Blois; Emmanuel-Jules Ravinet, Bishop of Troyes; Augustin Hacquard, Bishop of Verdun; and Pierre-Marie-Gervais Lacarrière, former Bishop of Basse-Terre and Guadeloupe. Supported by Henri-Alexandre Wallon, Dupanloup submitted a petition to Pope Pius IX, signed by the aforementioned bishops, and other dignitaries, for Joan to be canonized, but the Franco-Prussian War postponed further action.

In 1874, depositions began to be collected, received by Cardinal Luigi Bilio in 1876. Dupanloup's successor, Bishop Pierre-Hector Coullié, directed an inquest to authenticate her acts and testimony from her trial and rehabilitation. On 27 January 1894, the Curia (Cardinals Benedetto Aloisi-Masella, Angelo Bianchi, Benoît-Marie Langénieux, Luigi Macchi, Camillo Mazzella, Paul Melchers, Mario Mocenni, Lucido Parocchi, Fulco Luigi Ruffo-Scilla, and Isidoro Verga) voted unanimously that Pope Leo XIII sign the Commissio Introductionis Causæ Servæ Dei Joannæ d'Arc, which he did that afternoon.

=== 20th century to present ===
Commemorative medallion made in France at the time of Joan of Arc's beatification

However, the path to sainthood did not go smoothly. On 20 August 1902, the papal consistory rejected adding Joan to the Calendar of saints, citing: she launched the assault on Paris on the birthday of Mary, mother of Jesus; her capture ("proof" her claim that she was sent by God was false); her attempts to escape from prison; her abjure after being threatened with death; and doubts of her purity. On 17 November 1903, the Sacred Congregation of Rites met to discuss Joan's cause at the behest of Pope Pius X. A decree proclaiming Joan's heroic virtue was issued on 6 January 1904 by Cardinal Serafino Cretoni, and Pius proclaimed her venerable on 8 January. The Decree of the Three Miracles was issued on 13 December 1908, and The Decree of Beatification was read five days later, which was issued formally by the Congregation of Rites on 24 January 1909.

The beatification ceremony was held on 18 April 1909, presided by Cardinals Sebastiano Martinelli and Mariano Rampolla. Bishop Stanislas Touchet performed the Mass. Cardinals Serafino Vannutelli, Pierre Andrieu, Louis Luçon, Coullié, Girolamo Maria Gotti, José Calassanç Vives y Tuto, then-Monsignor Rafael Merry del Val, Bishop John Patrick Farrelly, Bishop Thomas Kennedy, Monsignor Robert Seton, Count Giulio Porro-Lambertenghi (grandson of Luigi Porro Lambertenghi) with tribunes from The Knights of Malta, The Duke of Alençon and The Duke of Vendôme, then-Archbishop William Henry O'Connell, and The Duke of Norfolk attended. Pius—who was determined that the ceremony would not be used by Legitimists to attack the Third Republic—venerated the relics that afternoon, flanked by 70 French prelates.

Her beatification approximately coincided with the French invention of the Janvier transfer engraving machine (also called a die engraving pantograph), which facilitates the creation of minted coins and commemorative medallions. This invention, together with the already well-established French sculptural tradition, added another element to Joan's beatification: a series of well-made religious art medals featuring scenes from her life.

Edmond Richer's La première histoire en date de Jeanne d'Arc: histoire de la Pucelle d'Orléans, written between 1625 and 1630, was published in two volumes in 1911 by Henri and Jules Desclée.

During World War I, French troops carried her image into battle with them. During one battle, they interpreted a German searchlight image projected onto low-lying clouds as an appearance by Joan, which bolstered their morale greatly. [see: The Maid of Orléans: The Story of Joan of Arc Told to American Soldiers by Charles Saroléa (1918)]

Her canonization was held on 16 May 1920. Over 60,000 people attended the ceremony, including 140 descendants of Joan's family. Dignitaries included: Vendôme, Lambertenghi with The Knights of Malta, now-Bishop O'Connell, Gabriel Hanotaux, Princess Zinaida Yusupova, Princess Irina Alexandrovna, Prince Feodor Alexandrovich, The Duke of Braganza, The Count de Salis-Soglio, Rafael Valentín Errázuriz, Diego von Bergen, Bishop John Patrick Carroll, Archbishop Edward Joseph Hanna, Bishop Daniel Mary Gorman, Bishop Paul Joseph Nussbaum, the student body of The American College of Rome, and now-Cardinal Merry del Val, who greeted Pope Benedict XV as Benedict entered St. Peter's Basilica to preside over the rites. The Latin bull of Pope Benedict XV effecting her canonization was Divina Disponente of the same date. Approximately 100,000 persons celebrated at Westminster Cathedral and French churches throughout London.

In the 18 May 1920 Le Matin, former President of France Raymond Poincaré wrote that Joan's canonization "fulfills the last part of her mission in bringing together forever in the sacredness of her memory" one-time mortal enemies England and France: "In her spirit, let us remain united for the good of Mankind".

== Popularity ==
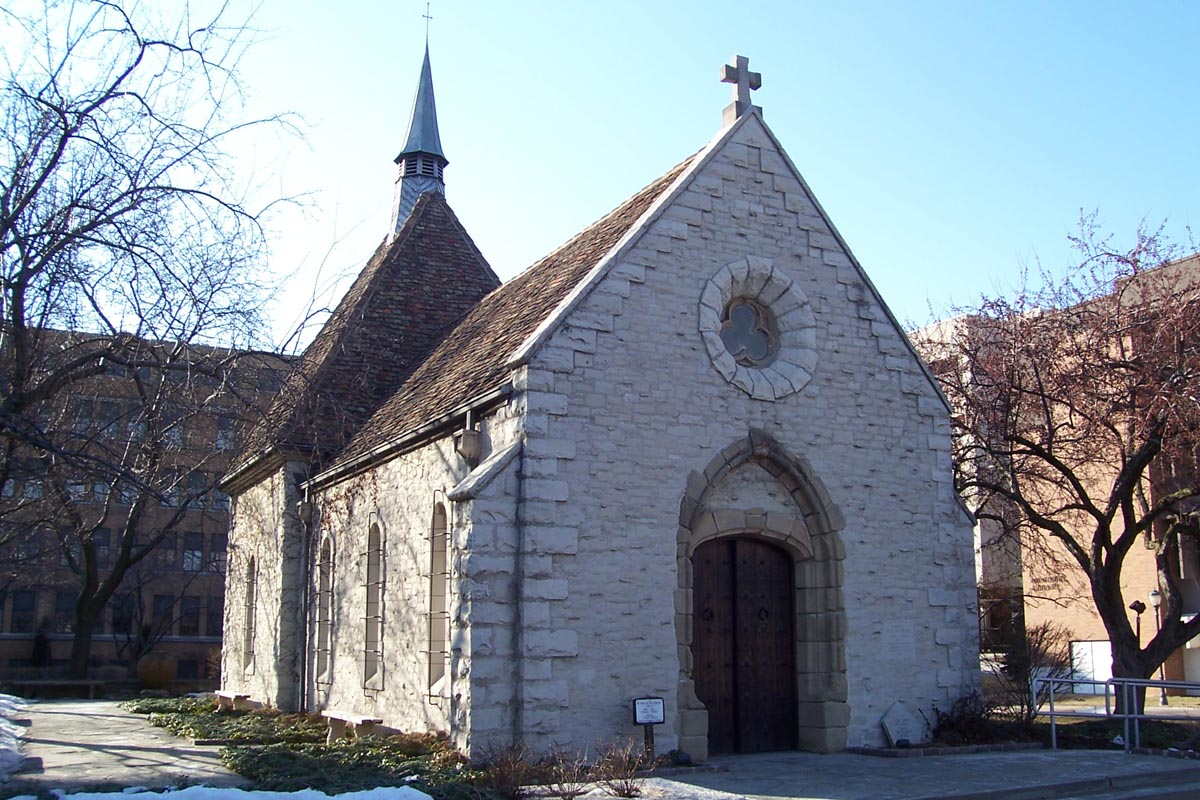
The St. Joan of Arc Chapel at the Marquette University campus, moved from its original location in France.

Joan of Arc's feast day is 30 May. Although reforms in 1968 moved many medieval European saints' days off the general calendar in order to make room for more non-Europeans, her feast day is still celebrated on many local and regional Church calendars, especially in France. Many Catholic churches around the globe have been named after her in the decades since her canonization.

She has become especially popular among Traditional Catholics, particularly in France—both because of her obvious connection to this country as well as the fact that the Traditional Catholic movement is strongest there. This movement within the church, which includes those few orders and societies which refused to accept the changes made by the Second Vatican Council, has compared the 1988 excommunication of Archbishop Marcel Lefebvre (one of the founders of the Society of Saint Pius X) to Joan of Arc's excommunication by a corrupt pro-English bishop in 1431.
