= Cultural depictions of Joan of Arc =

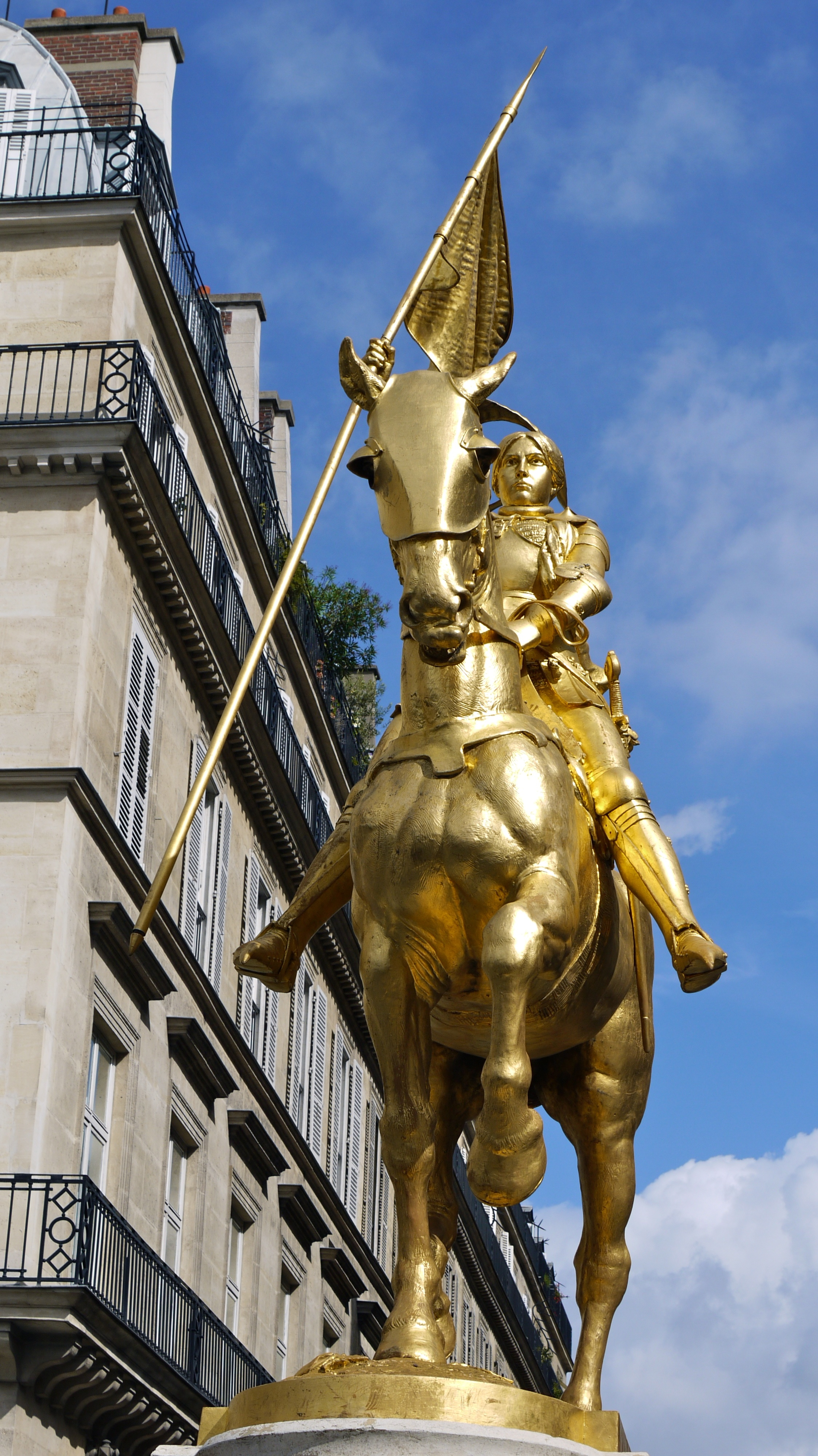
Jeanne d'Arc statue at Place des Pyramides, Paris by Emmanuel Frémiet, 1874

Joan of Arc (Jeanne d'Arc in French) has inspired artistic and cultural works for nearly six centuries. The following lists cover various media to include items of historic interest, enduring works of high art, and recent representations in popular culture. The entries represent portrayals that a reader has a reasonable chance of encountering rather than a complete catalog. Lesser known works, particularly from early periods, are not included. In this article, many of the excluded items are derivative of better known representations. For instance, Friedrich Schiller's 1801 play The Maid of Orleans inspired at least 82 different dramatic works during the nineteenth century, and Verdi's and Tchaikovsky's operatic adaptations are still recorded and performed. Most of the others survive only in research libraries. As another example, in 1894, Émile Huet listed over 400 plays and musical works about Joan of Arc. Despite a great deal of scholarly interest in Joan of Arc, no complete list of artistic works about her exists, although a 1989 doctoral dissertation did identify all relevant films including ones for which no copy survives.

Portrayals of Joan of Arc are numerous. For example, in 1979 the Bibliothèque Municipale in Rouen, France displayed a gallery containing over 500 images and other items related to Joan of Arc. The story of Joan of Arc was a popular subject for dramatization in the 1940s. In addition to Maxwell Anderson's play Joan of Lorraine and the Ingrid Bergman film Joan of Arc, there was also the 1948 RKO film The Miracle of the Bells starring Fred MacMurray, Alida Valli, and Frank Sinatra, about a dying film actress whose first and last role is Joan of Arc. There were also three radio dramatizations of the story of Joan during those years, one of them specifically written with a World War II framework.

== Literature and theatre ==
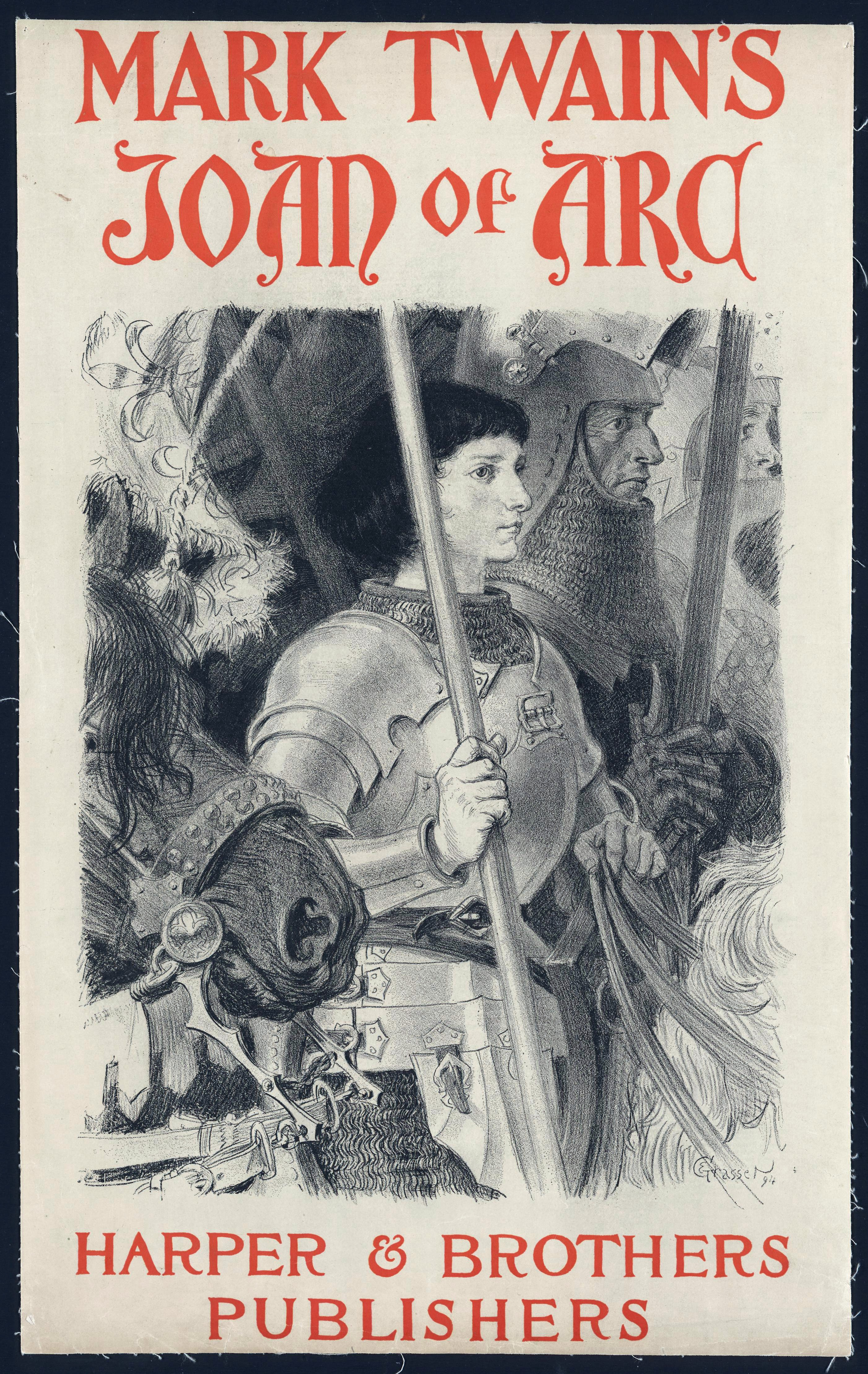
Personal Recollections of Joan of Arc by Mark Twain, 1896 novel

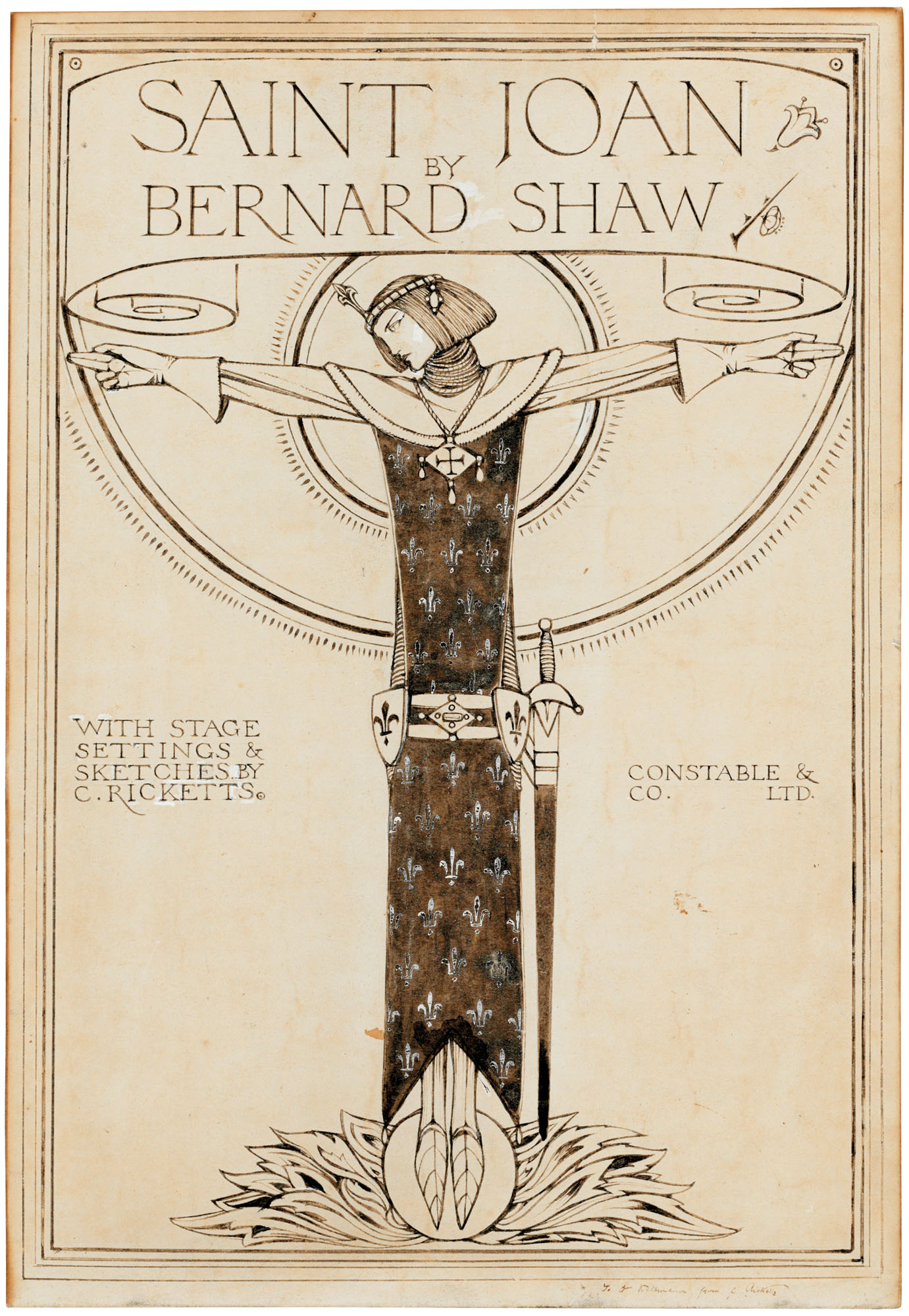
Saint Joan by George Bernard Shaw, 1923 play

Lachmi Bai, the Joan of Arc of India, by 'Michael White. Lachmi Bai, the Rani of Jhansi, a major leader of the Indian Rebellion of 1857, was like Joan of Arc a courageous warrior woman, admired as a heroine after her death.

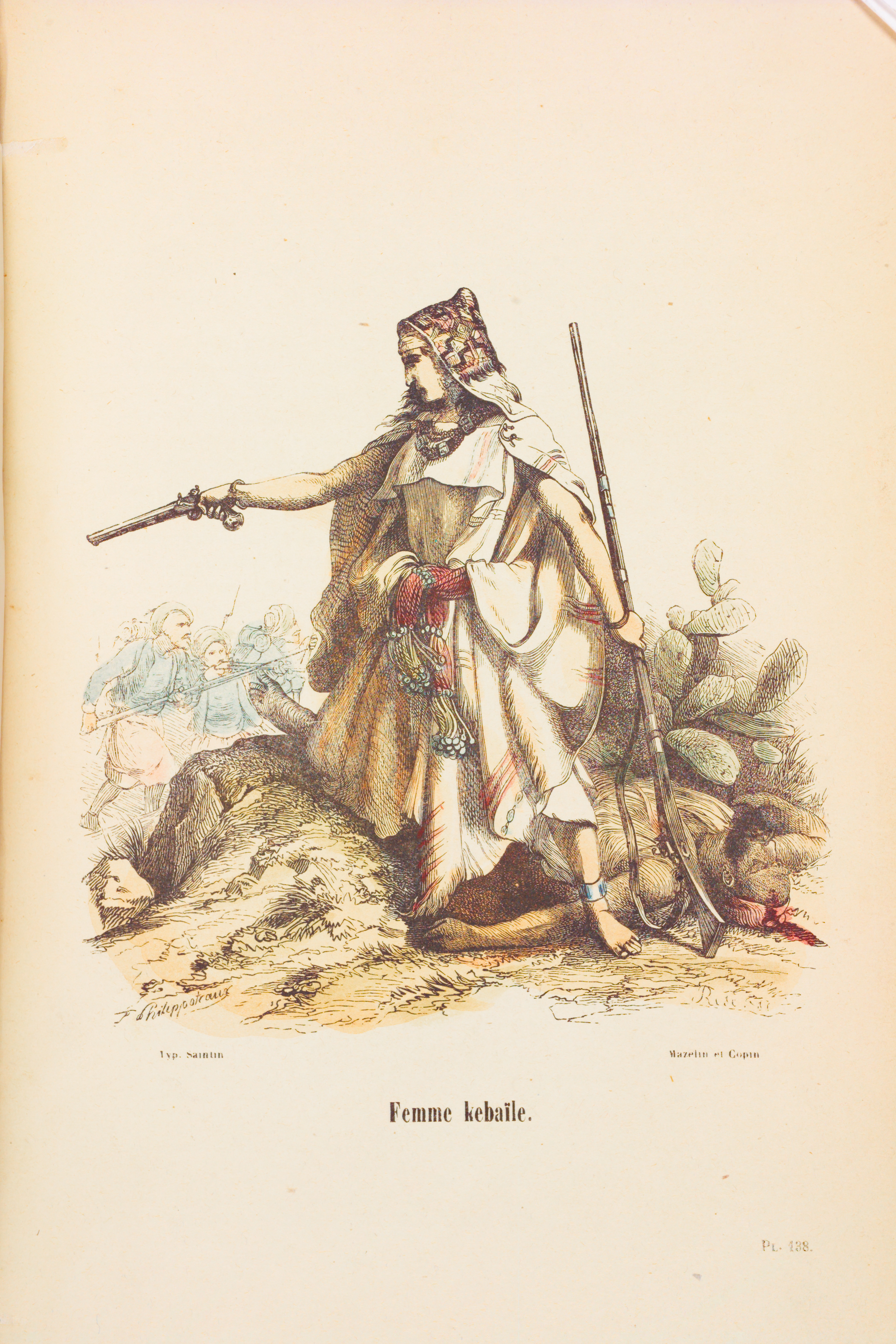
Lalla Fatma N'Soumer, the Kabile woman who led a prolonged resistance to the French conquest of Algeria, was respected and honored by her French foes as "The Alegerian Jeanne d'Arc" or "La Jeanne d'Arc du Djurdjura". Like Joan of Arc, Lalla Fatma N'Soumer was a notable religious leader as well as a political and military one. (Here shown in a famous painting by Henri Félix Emmanuel Philippoteaux).

Date	Title	Author	Notes
1429	"Chanson en l'honneur de Jeanne d'Arc"	Christine de Pizan	An elegiac poem written during Joan's lifetime. The author's final work. English translation available.
1435	Histoire du Siège d'Orléans	Anonymous (possibly Jacques Millet)	First performed in Orléans four years after Joan's death. The surviving version appears to be a revision from circa 1450. God and several saints play major roles in this sprawling drama with more than 100 speaking parts.
after 1435	Ballade	François Villon	Part of Le Testament, Villon calls Joan "the good (woman from) Lorraine whom the English burned in Rouen".
1590	Henry VI, Part 1	William Shakespeare	Drawn from 16th century English sources, Joan begins with the appearance of piety but soon proves to be a cunning witch justly executed.
1756	La Pucelle d'Orléans	Voltaire	A mock epic poem that explores typically Voltairean themes deriding mysticism as humbug.
1796	Joan of Arc	Robert Southey	An epic poem
1801	Die Jungfrau von Orleans	Friedrich Schiller	In literary rebuttal to Voltaire, Schiller creates a sympathetic Joan as a Romantic heroine. A magic helmet renders her invincible until she falls in love, and is killed in battle rather than being burned at the stake. This drama was the basis of Tchaikovsky's opera of the same name.
1817	Histoire de Jeanne d'Arc Tome1 Tome2 Tome3 Tome4	Philippe-Alexandre Le Brun de Charmettes	Drawn from her own declarations, 144 depositions of witnesses, and manuscripts of the library of the King and the Tower of London.
1819	L'Orléanide: Poème National en Vingt-Huit Chants	Philippe-Alexandre Le Brun de Charmettes	Epic poem based on his Histoire de Jeanne d'Arc
1821	The Destiny of Nations	Samuel Taylor Coleridge	Initially part of Robert Southey's Joan of Arc
1835	Little Arthur's History of England	Maria Graham	Joan's story is briefly commented on by the author in the chapter on the life of King Henry VI. Joan is described positively as courageous and merciful.
1849	"Couteau de Executioner ou Jéanne d'Arc: Un conte de l'Inquisition"	Eugène Sue	From serial novel Les Mystères du Peuple. Translated into English as The Executioner's Knife or Joan of Arc: A Tale of the Inquisition by Daniel De Leon (1910)
1894	La Mission de Jeanne d'Arc	Thérèse of Lisieux	The first of two 'pious recreations' written by the Saint; "small theatrical pieces performed by a few nuns for the rest of the community, on the occasion of certain feast days." Performed at the Carmel on 21 January 1894, it featured Thérèse in the title role. The script, which focuses more heavily upon Joan's interaction with her visions, has since been widely circulated with Saint Thérèse's writings, as has that of its sequel.
1895	Jeanne d'Arc Accomplit Sa Mission	Thérèse of Lisieux	Sequel to La Mission de Jeanne d'Arc, this was performed exactly one year later, 21 January 1895. Again featuring Thérèse as Joan, its focus is upon her martyrdom. In the estimation of Thérèse's biographer, Ida Görres, the two plays "are scarcely veiled self-portraits."
1896	Personal Recollections of Joan of Arc	Mark Twain	This work is little remembered yet in Mark Twain's own opinion was his finest work. Twain spent months in France researching newly rediscovered documents and years of research overall. This reverent fictional biography is Twain's most uncharacteristic novel. Project Gutenberg text: Vol. 1 and Vol. 2. He published it under a different pseudonym: Jean François Alden.
1896	Jeanne d'Arc	Charles Péguy	Play chronicling Joan's life
1910	Jéanne d'Arc, Médium	Léon Denis	Translated into English as The Mystery of Joan of Arc by Arthur Conan Doyle (1924)
1912	Tapisserie de Sainte Geneviève et Jeanne d'Arc	Charles Péguy	Poem about Joan and Saint Geneviève
1923	Gilles und Johanna	Georg Kaiser	Expressionist drama explores Joan's relationship with Gilles de Rais, who would become one of the most-notorious criminals in French history
1923	Saint Joan	George Bernard Shaw	This drama, widely esteemed as Shaw's masterpiece, draws heavily from trial records. Historians dismiss Shaw's contention that she was an early Protestant with impartial judges. Subsequent twentieth century plays often mirror Shaw's interest in her trial. ISBN 0-14-043791-6
1930	Saint Joan of the Stockyards	Bertolt Brecht	Transposes Joan to working-class Chicago and portrays her as a labor leader. 1st of his 3 plays on Joan. ISBN 1-55970-420-9
1935	A Vida de Joana D'Arc	Érico Veríssimo	A Brazilian historical novel addressed to young people.
1937	Der Prozeß der Johanna von Arc zu Rouen	Anna Seghers	In German. Radio play based on the trial records.
1942	The Visions of Simone Machard	Bertolt Brecht and Lion Feuchtwanger	A girl imagines herself as Joan during World War II while in a dream. Second of his 3 plays on Joan.
1943	The Fountainhead	Ayn Rand	Rand's original manuscript of The Fountainhead included a major character named Vesta Dunning, a talented young actress whose greatest dream is to play Joan of Arc on the stage. In one scene, Dunning is shown rehearsing a long monologue by Joan of Arc ("If you but follow me, we'll lift together the siege of Orleans and win freedom!"). However, Rand – pressured by her publisher to shorten the book – entirely dropped this character from the final published text. The deleted parts, including the Joan of Arc monologue, were published after Rand's death by Leonard Peikoff.
1946	Joan of Lorraine	Maxwell Anderson	This play-within-a-play is chiefly memorable for Ingrid Bergman's Tony-winning performance. ASIN B0006YOM36
1952	The Trial of Joan of Arc of Proven, 1431	Bertolt Brecht and Benno Besson	Adaptation of Anna Seghers's Der Prozeß der Johanna von Arc zu Rouen
1953	L'Alouette	Jean Anouilh	An allegory of Vichy collaboration in the aftermath of World War II. Lillian Hellman's noteworthy English translation adds a critique of McCarthyism and included a score by Leonard Bernstein. ISBN 0-8222-0634-X
1955	Seraphic Dialogue	Martha Graham	Modern-dance work in one act with choreography by Graham, music by Norman Dello Joio, set by Isamu Noguchi, costumes by Graham, and lighting by Jean Rosenthal. It was originally choreographed as a solo (same music, 1950) under Triumph of St Joan. In this revised version, Joan looks back over her life in a series of danced dialogues with her guiding spirit, St Michael, and with three figures who represent different aspects of her nature: maid, warrior, and martyr. At the work's close, the transfigured Joan takes her place among the saints.
1956	De Jungfrur av Orleans	Sven Stolpe	Novel written as Joan telling the reader about her life story.
1961	Die Sendung des Mädchens Jeanne d'Arc	M.J. Krück von Poturzyn	Romanticized novel about the life of Joan of Arc.
1964	The Dead Lady of Clown Town	Cordwainer Smith	A far-future science fiction story with strong parallels to the history of Joan of Arc.
1968	The Image of the Beast	Philip José Farmer	Joan of Arc is portrayed as an alien sexual predator, still alive in the 20th century but with her body altered to enable the also-alien 15th-century serial killer Gilles de Rais to live within her vagina dentata as a fang-toothed venomous snake that bites and paralyses men during intercourse.
1972	"Jeanne d'Arc"	Patti Smith	Poem. From Seventh Heaven.
1974	Blood Red, Sister Rose	Thomas Keneally	The novel explores the imagined psychology of Joan and tells her story from Domrémy to the coronation of Charles VII. Significant secondary characters include Charles and Gilles de Rais. The novel enters into the minds of Joan and Charles but not of Gilles. A notable feature of the book is the conversations of Joan with her voices. ISBN 0-00-221087-8
1975	The Banner of Joan	H. Warner Munn	Book-length poem about Joan's life.
1981	Joan of Arc: The Image of Female Heroism	Marina Warner	(University of California Press, 1981 ISBN 0-520-22464-7) The work is not so much a biography as a book about Joan of Arc or, more precisely, how she has been perceived by others over the centuries and how that perception has shaped her image.
1993	The Second Coming of Joan of Arc	Carolyn Gage	A one woman-lesbian play. Joan returns to share her story with contemporary women. She tells her experiences with the highest levels of church, state, and military, portraying male institutions as brutal and misogynistic. ISBN 0-939821-06-0
1997	An Army of Angels	Pamela Marcantel	A novel which depicts Joan of Arc according to the author's conception of her personality. ISBN 0-312-18042-X
1998	Joan of Arc	Michael Morpurgo	Historical novel about Joan for children. Republished as Sparrow: The True Story of Joan of Arc in 2012 ISBN 978-0-00-746595-8
1999	Jeanne d'Arc	Michel Peyramaure	A novel in two parts (in French). ISBN 2-221-08922-7, 2-221-08923-5.
2003	Monstrous Regiment	Terry Pratchett	Part of the Discworld series, a fictional character styled after Joan of Arc dresses as a man to lead an army. ISBN 0-06-001316-8
2005	La Hire: Ou la Colère de Jéanne	Régine Deforges	Joan's story from the perspective of military commander La Hire ISBN 2-213-62497-6
2006	Rogue Angel Series	Alex Archer	A series of action/adventure novels, the main character of which is the successor to Joan of Arc.
2006	Johanna	Felicitas Hoppe	Postmodern novel rejecting any endeavor to fictionalize Joan of Arc. ISBN 978-3-596-16743-2
2008	The Magician: The Secrets of the Immortal Nicholas Flamel	Michael Scott	Fantasy novel in which Joan of Arc features prominently. She is an immortal living in modern-day Paris. It is explained that she was rescued from her execution by the warrior Scathach.
2011	The Maid	Kimberly Cutter	Historical novel about Joan.
2013	Fate/Apocrypha	Yuichiro Higashide	Part of the Fate franchise. Jeanne (Voiced by: Maaya Sakamoto (Japanese); Erika Harlacher (English)) is summoned as a Ruler-class Servant to oversee the Great Holy Grail War, in which two teams consisting of seven Servants battle for control of the Holy Grail.
2017	The Book of Joan	Lidia Yuknavitch	Science fiction novel.
2022	Joan	Katherine J. Chen	A feminist retelling novelisation.
2022	I, Joan	Charlie Josephine	Debut at the Shakespeare's Globe Theatre. Portrays Joan as trans and non-binary, as a central theme of the plot. Both the playwright (Charlie Josephine), and the actor playing Joan (Isobel Thom) also identify as non-binary.
2022	The Genesis of Misery	Neon Yang	Neon Yang's novel is a retelling of the story of Joan of Arc as a mecha space opera. It is the first in a planned trilogy.
2023	Born to Do This: The Joan of Arc Rock Opera	Zoe Bradford	Debut at The Company Theatre in Norwell, Massachusetts. A sung-through, contemporary rock opera based on Jeanne D'Arc's life and death.
2025	Written on the Dark	Guy Gavriel Kay	Guy Gavriel Kay's novel includes a retelling of the story of Joan of Arc in which she successfully defends the novel's version of France from its English invaders in a reimagining of the Battle of Agincourt. In his novel, Joan of Arc survives and a double is burned in her place.

== Operas, oratorios, and vocal works ==
Date	Title	Composer	Genre	Notes
1789	Giovanna d'Arco	Gaetano Andreozzi	opera	Libretto by Antonio Simeone Sografi. Premiere at the Teatro Nuovo Eretenio in Vicenza on 27 June 1789.
1790	Jeanne d'Arc à Orléans	Rodolphe Kreutzer	opéra comique	Libretto by Pierre Jean Baptiste Choudard Desforges. Premiered at the Comédie-Italienne on 10 May 1790.
1821	Giovanna d'Arco	Salvatore Viganò	ballet	Plot influenced by Die Jungfrau von Orleans by Schiller. Premiered at La Scala on 3 March 1821.
1821	Jeanne d'Arc à Orléans	Michele Carafa	opéra comique	Libretto by Emmanuel Théaulon and Armand Dartois, after Schiller. Premiere at Théâtre Feydeau on 10 March 1821.
1825	Giovanna d'Arco	Giuseppe Nicolini	opera	Libretto by Apostolo Zeno. Premiered at Teatro Regio on 22 January 1825.
1827	Giovanna d'Arco	Nicola Vaccai	opera	Libretto by Gaetano Rossi. Premiered at La Fenice on 17 February 1827.
1830	Giovanna d'Arco	Giovanni Pacini	opera	Libretto by Gaetano Barbieri, after Schiller. Premiered at La Scala on 14 March 1830.
1832	Giovanna d'Arco	Gioachino Rossini	cantata	Anonymous text set for contralto and piano. Orchestral version by Salvatore Sciarrino.
1837	Joan of Arc	Michael William Balfe	opera	Premiered at Drury Lane on 30 November 1837
1845	Giovanna d'Arco	Giuseppe Verdi	opera	Libretto by Temistocle Solera, after Schiller. Premiered at La Scala on 15 February 1845.
1865	Jeanne d'Arc	Gilbert Duprez	opera	Libretto by Joseph Méry, after Schiller. Premiered at Salle Le Peletier on 24 October 1865.
1873–1877	Jeanne d'Arc	Text by Jules Barbier; music by Charles Gounod.	drama	Incidental music for Barbier's play
1878	The Maid of Orleans	Pyotr Ilyich Tchaikovsky	opera	Plot influenced by Schiller.
1913	Giovanna d'Arco	Marco Enrico Bossi	oratorio	Libretto by Luigi Orsini, after Schiller.
1921	Giovanna d'Arco	Alberto Pestalozza	Marionette opera	Libretto by Pestalozza, after Schiller. Premiered in Turin on 17 September 1921
1939	Jeanne d'Arc au Bûcher	Text by Paul Claudel; music by Arthur Honegger	dramatic oratorio	Ends with the Inquisition accusing Joan's judges of heresy. Marion Cotillard played Joan in 2005, 2012, and 2015.
1943	Szenen aus dem Leben der Heiligen Johanna	Music and libretto by Walter Braunfels	Opera	Based on the actual documents of Joan's trial. Was not performed until 2001.
1950	The Triumph of St. Joan	Norman Dello Joio	Opera	Adapted by Joio into an opera for television (1956), a one-act opera (1959), and a symphony (1951).
1953	Ballade des Dames du temps jadis	Musical adaptation by Georges Brassens of a poem by François Villon	Art song	Brassens set a number of poems to music, and often performed them himself.
1956	Le triomphe de Jeanne	Henri Tomasi	opera-oratorio	Libretto by Tomasi and Philippe Soupault, after Schiller. Premiered at the Théâtre-Cirque in Rouen on 23 June 1956.
1966	Choruses from The Lark by Jean Anouilh	music by Leonard Bernstein	choral pieces	Incidental score for a production of the play in an adaptation by Lillian Hellman.
1971	The Survival of St. Joan	Text by James Lineberger; music by Hank Ruffin, and Gary Ruffin	rock opera	Based on a legend of Joan escaping her execution, and being kept in the home of a shepherd.
1976	Das Mädchen aus Domrémy	Music and libretto by Giselher and Lore Klebe	opera	Based on Die Jungfrau von Orleans. Premiered at the Staatsoper Stuttgart on 19 June 1976.
1981	"The Holy Presence of Joan d'Arc" and "Untitled [Prelude to the Holy Presence of Joan d'Arc]"	Julius Eastman	cello ensemble, solo vocal piece	First performed at The Kitchen (art institution) in 1981. Text of the "Prelude" by Eastman, based on the instructions Joan supposedly received from St Michael, St Margaret and St Catherine
1989	Mistero e processo di Giovanna d'Arco	Roberto De Simone	Melodrama	Libretto by De Simone, after Schiller. Premiered at Teatro Verdi in Pisa on 26 October 1989.
1994	Voices of Light	Richard Einhorn	choral orchestral work	Inspired by The Passion of Joan of Arc; uses sacred texts by Hildegard of Bingen.
1997	Jeanne: The Joan of Arc Musical	text by Vincent de Tourdonnet; music by Peter Sipos	musical theatre	Based on historical research. Translated into French by Antonine Maillet. Renamed Jeanne la Pucelle.
2017	Joan of Arc: Into the Fire	David Byrne	rock opera	Joan is re-imagined, in Byrne's words, as "a religious maniac who raised an army to kill people".

== Images ==
Date	Title	Artist	Location	Notes	Image
10 May 1429		Clément de Fauquembergue		Sketch in the margin of the register of the Parlement of Paris by Clément de Fauquembergue, 1429, drawn on the day that news arrived in Paris of the French victory at Orléans. Though Fauquembergue never saw her in person, this is the only extant depiction from her lifetime (apart from her possible likeness of the head of Saint-Maurice in Orléans).	
c. 1450				"Joan of Arc compared to Judith", miniature in an illustrated manuscript of Le Champion des Dames by Martin le Franc. Joan of Arc is shown standing next Judith beheading Holofernes. Joan at right is holding her coat of arms	
c. 1460	Chronique de Charles VII	Jean Chartier		Miniature portrait in an illustrated manuscript, similar portrayal to Le Champion des Dames.	
1493	Jeanne Hunts Prostitutes in the Army	Martial d'Auvergne		Miniature from Vigiles du roi Charles VII à neuf psaumes et neuf leçons	
1493	Siege of Orléans	Martial d'Auvergne		Miniature from Vigiles du roi Charles VII à neuf psaumes et neuf leçons	
1493	Joan of Arc and Charles VII, King of France	Martial d'Auvergne		Miniature from Vigiles du roi Charles VII à neuf psaumes et neuf leçons	
1493	The Citizens of Troyes Hand Over City Keys to the Dauphin and Joan of Arc	Martial d'Auvergne		Miniature from Vigiles du roi Charles VII à neuf psaumes et neuf leçons	
1493	The Assault on Paris	Martial d'Auvergne		Miniature from Vigiles du roi Charles VII à neuf psaumes et neuf leçons	
1493	Jeanne is Driven in Front of Her Judges	Martial d'Auvergne		Miniature from Vigiles du roi Charles VII à neuf psaumes et neuf leçons	
1493	Jeanne Being Tied Up	Martial d'Auvergne		Miniature from Vigiles du roi Charles VII à neuf psaumes et neuf leçons	
15th century	Chronique abrégée des rois de France, [Chronicle of the Kings of France]			Coronation of Charles VII in Reims; Joan of Arc at right holding Banner of France	
late 15th century	untitled	?	Hermitage of Notre-Dame de Bermont, France	Fresco of two young women: one a peasant girl at prayer, the other dressed in male attire: possible depictions of Joan of Arc rediscovered underneath a later work. Joan of Arc was known to pray often at the site.	
late 15th century	Joan of Arc	?	Hermitage of Notre-Dame de Bermont, France	The young girl is kneeling, doubtless in a chateau, because the ground is not the beaten earth of the houses of the era but a green and black tile-flooring. She is dressed in grey, with high hose, an attire of a man. Thence to think that it has to do with the departure from Vaucouleurs or arrival at Chinon, there is not but to take a step; to prove it is another thing.	
c. 1500	"helmeted head of a statue"		Musée Historique et Archeologique, Orléans	The head of a statue, discovered in 1820 in the ruins of the Church of Saint-Maurice, Orléans, long considered to have been modelled after the likeness of Joan of Arc.	
1505	Joan of Arc on horseback	Jean Pichore	Musée Dobrée	Illustration from Les Vies des femmes célèbres de Antoine Du Four (1504–1506)	
1557	Portrait of the Town Council of Orléans (Jeanne d'Arc, portrait des échevins)	?		Joan of Arc wears a robe with slashed sleeves and a plume (symbolic of victory in war) and holds a sword. This became a model for many later portraits.	
1620	Joan of Arc at Prayer	Peter Paul Rubens	North Carolina Museum of Art, Raleigh, North Carolina		
1819	Joan of Arc Imprisoned in Rouen	Pierre Révoil	Musée des Beaux-Arts de Rouen	oil on canvas, 137 cm (53.9 in) x 174.5 cm (68.7 in).	
1824	Jeanne d'Arc interrogated in prison by the cardinal of Winchester	Paul Delaroche	Musée des Beaux-Arts, Rouen	oil on canvas 277 x 217 cm	
1830	The Painter's Studio	Josef Danhauser	Museum of Fine Arts, Budapest		
1833	Jeanne d'Arc, in the presence of Charles VII, answers questions from churchmen about her visions and revelations	Gillot Saint-Èvre	Louvre, Paris	170 x 140 cm	
1833	Jeanne d'Arc in prison	Gillot Saint-Èvre	private collection	oil on canvas, 119 x 109 cm	
1835	The Arrest of Jeanne d'Arc	Adèle Martin	private collection	oil on canvas, 112 x 85 cm	
before 1843	Jeanne d'Arc	Raymond Monvoisin	Collection of the Palacio Vergara de Viña del Mar	oil on canvas, 142 × 101 cm (55.9 × 39.8 in)	
1843	"Joan of Arc, On finding in the church of St Catherine de Frébus the sword she dreamt of, devotes herself & it to the service of God & her country"	William Etty	Sold by Bonhams in 2021	Left hand panel of triptych	
1843	Jeanne d'Arc à la sortie d'Orléans, repoussant les Anglais [Joan of Arc at the exit of Orléans, repelling the English] '	William Etty	Musée des Beaux-Arts d'Orléans	Central panel of triptych	
1843	"Joan of Arc, after rendering the most signal services to her Prince and people, is suffered to die a martyr in their cause"	William Etty	Library of Congress	Sketch of Right hand Panel of triptych Showing martyrdom of Joan of Arc from C.W.Wass engraving	
1843	"Joan of Arc, after rendering the most signal services to her Prince and people, is suffered to die a martyr in their cause"	William Etty	Penny Illustrated News	Penny Illustrated News Sketch of Right hand Panel of triptych Showing martyrdom of Joan of Arc from C.W.Wass engraving	
1843	Auftreten von Heiliges Catherine und Michael zu Johanna von Arc	Hermann Anton Stilke	Hermitage Museum, Saint Petersburg	oil on canvas, 119.5 × 83.5 cm (47 × 32.9 in)	
1843	Johanna von Arc in der Schlacht	Hermann Anton Stilke	Hermitage Museum, Saint Petersburg	oil on canvas, 135 × 146 cm (53.1 × 57.5 in)	
1843	Tod von Johanna von Arc auf dem Scheiterhaufen	Hermann Anton Stilke	Hermitage Museum, Saint Petersburg	oil on canvas 119.5 × 83.5 cm (47 × 32.9 in)	
1843	Entry of Jeanne d'Arc at Orléans, 8 May 1429	Henry Scheffer	Palace of Versailles (Galerie des Batailles), Versailles	oil on canvas, Height: 425 cm (167.3 in). Width: 483 cm (190.2 in)	
1847–1852	Capturer de Jeanne d'Arc	Adolf Alexander Dillens	Hermitage Museum, Saint Petersburg	52.5 × 72 cm (20.7 × 28.3 in)	
1852	Johanna von Orléans in der Schlacht	August Gustav Lasinsky		oil on canvas, 76,5 x 107,5 cm.	
1854	Jeanne au Couronnement de Charles VII	Jean-Auguste-Dominique Ingres	Musée du Louvre, Paris	oil on canvas, 240 cm (94.5 in) x 178 cm (70.1 in)	
ca. 1859	Jeanne d'Arc écoutant ses voix (Joan of Arc listening to voices)	François-Léon Benouville	Musée des Beaux-Arts de Rouen		
ca. 1860	Jeanne d'Arc au siège de Paris (Joan of Arc at the Siege of Paris)	Jozef Van Lerius	Private collection	oil on panel, 108.8 × 179 cm (46 ¾ x 70 ½ in)	
1863	Joan of Arc Kissing the Sword of Deliverance	Dante Gabriel Rossetti	Strasbourg Museum of Modern and Contemporary Art, Strasbourg	oil on canvas, 61.2 × 53.2 cm (24.1 × 20.9 in)	
1864	Jeanne d'Arc Prisoner of the English	Stanisław Chlebowski	Musée Barrois (Bar-le-Duc), France		
1864	Joan of Arc	Dante Gabriel Rossetti	private collection	watercolor and bodycolour over pencil, 31 × 30 cm (12.2 × 11.8 in)	
1865	Joan of Arc	John Everett Millais	Private collection		
1876	Jeanne d'Arc écoutant les voix (Joan of Arc's awe upon receiving a vision from the Archangel Michael)	Eugène Thirion	Ville de Chatou, église Notre-Dame	oil on canvas	
1879	Jeanne d'Arc	Jules Bastien-Lepage	Metropolitan Museum of Art, New York City	oil on canvas 100" x 110"	
1880	Joan Captured by the Burgundians at Compiègne	Giraudon	Panthéon, Paris	mural	
1884	Joan of Arc Listening for the First Time to the Voices That Predict Her Prominent Fate	Pedro Américo	Museu Nacional de Belas Artes, Rio de Janeiro	oil on canvas, 229 × 156 cm (90.2 × 61.4 in)	
1886	The Maid of Orleans, entrance of Joan of Arc into Reims in 1429	Jan Matejko	National Museum in Kraków		
1887	Entree de Jeanne d'Arc à Orléans	Jean-Jacques Scherrer	Musée Jeanne-d'Arc, Rouen		
1889	Joan of Arc, or Breton girl spinning	Paul Gauguin	Van Gogh Museum, Amsterdam	Fresco in wooden support, 134 × 62.9 cm (52.8 × 24.8 in)	
1880–1890	Jeanne d'Arc hears her voices	Eugène Carrière	Musée d'Orsay, Paris		
1886–1890	Jeanne d'Arc, Bergère	Jules Eugène Lenepveu	Panthéon, Paris		
1886–1890	Jeanne d'Arc in armor before Orléans	Jules Eugène Lenepveu	Panthéon, Paris		
1886–1890	Jeanne d'Arc in Rheims at the time of king Charles VII's coronation	Jules Eugène Lenepveu	Panthéon, Paris		
1886–1890	Jeanne at the stake	Jules Eugène Lenepveu	Panthéon, Paris		
1895	Sleeping Joan of Arc	George W. Joy			
1896	L'histoire de Jeanne d'Arc	Louis-Maurice Boutet de Monvel		illustrations for his L'histoire de Jeanne d'Arc	
19th century	Jeanne d'Arc + 1431	?	Musée Louis-Philippe, Eu, Seine-Maritime	oil on canvas, 124.5 × 89 cm (49 × 35 in)	
ca. 19th century	"Joan of Arc Burning at the Stake"	Frédéric Théodore Lix (1830–1897)			
ca. 19th/20th century	Jeanne d´Arc	François Chifflart		Oil on canvas, 75 x 60 cm.	
late 19th century		Anonymous (Georges Spetz or the Spanish Forger?)		Miniature portrait (Centre Historique des Archives Nationales, Paris, AE II 2490, late 19th-century art forgery).	
late 19th century	Joan of Arc Kneeling Before an Angel	Henryk Siemiradzki			
ca. 1901	Jeanne d'Arc	François Chifflart		Oil on canvas, 73 x 60 cm.	
1901	Jeanne d'Arc	Albert Lynch	Private Collection, Doyon Art Appraisal, Pensacola, Florida	painting	
1907	Joan of Arc in Battle	Frank Craig			
1909	Sainte Jeanne d'Arc	Paul de La Boulaye		oil on canvas	
1909	Maude Adams as Joan of Arc	Alphonse Mucha			
before 1911	Joan of Arc in Prison	Howard Pyle	private collection	oil on canvas	
1912	Portrait of Joan of Arc	Andrew C.P. Haggard			
1912	Jeanne d'Arc	Roger de La Fresnaye	Musée d'art moderne de Troyes, Troyes		
1918	Joan of Arc	Frank Schoonover		illustrations for the Lucy Foster Madison book Joan of Arc	
? (19th century)	The departure of Jeanne d'Arc	Jean-Jacques Scherrer	Musée Jeanne-d'Arc, Vaucouleurs	oil on canvas 430 x 320 cm	
?	St. Joan	John William Waterhouse (1849–1917)	private collection	oil on canvas, 48 × 55 cm (18.9 × 21.7 in)	
?	Joan of Arc	Charles-Amable Lenoir (1860–1926)	private collection		
?	Jeanne d'Arc	Gaston Bussière			
?	Joan of Arc	Gari Melchers (1860–1932)	Indianapolis Museum of Art, Indianapolis	oil on canvas, 30 × 23 in (76.2 × 58.4 cm)	
before 1933	Joan of Arc	Annie Swynnerton			
c. 1897	Joan of Arc	Harold H. Piffard	Public collection	oil on canvas, 91.5 × 72.2 cm (36 × 28.4 in)	
c. 1900	Joan of Arc	William Blake Richmond	Private collection	oil on canvas, 99.1 × 80.6 cm (36 × 28.4 in)	
1989	Adam and Eve	George Martin	Lesbian, Gay, Bisexual & Transgender Community Center, New York, USA	acrylic on wall	
1999	Jehanne 1429	Arnaud Courlet de Vregille	Encyclopédie des Arts en Franche-Comté, Jacques Rittaud-Hutinet, 2004	Acrylic and pastel, 60 x 40	
2001	Joan of Arc	Donato Giancola		17" x 27" Oil on Paper	
2013	Joan of Arc	Donato Giancola		24" x 42" Oil on Panel	

== Sculpture ==
Date	Artist	Location	Notes
1852	François Rude	Paris, Jardin du Luxembourg	Standing figure.
1855	Denis Foyatier, with bas relief pedestal by Vital Dubray	Orléans, place du Martroi	Bronze equestrian statue.
1874	Emmanuel Frémiet	Philadelphia, Fairmount Park	Equestrian statue. Made from a plaster mold commissioned in 1874 by Napoleon III and originally located in Paris; a copy of the Paris statue was commissioned by Philadelphia, but Frémiet sent the original, as he had replaced the Paris statue with a revised one.
1882	Frederic Leroux	Compiègne, France	
1889	Paul DuBois	Reims, France	Equestrian statue.
1891	Marius Mercié	Domrémy-la-Pucelle, France	
1892	Louis-Ernest Barrias	Bonsecours, France	Standing figure in white marble and gold leaf. In 1990 the original was moved to the church basilica and its gold leaf was removed. A copy in gold leaf now occupies the site where the original once stood.
1895	Paul DuBois	Paris, Place St. Augustin	Equestrian Statue located in front of the Eglise St. Augustin. Copies were placed in other cities in France, such as Rheims and Strasbourg.
1899	Emmanuel Frémiet	Paris, Place des Pyramides	Equestrian statue. Originally commissioned in 1874 by Napoleon III; this is a revised version of the statue Frémiet made at that time.
1900	Prosper d'Épinay	Rheims, France	Standing figure. Donated to Reims cathedral in 1909.
1907	Emmanuel Frémiet	State Library of Victoria, Australia	Equestrian statue, replica of the Emmanuel Frémiet statue in Paris.
1915	Anna Hyatt Huntington	New York City, Riverside Park at 93rd Street	Equestrian statue. This was the first public statue in the city to be dedicated to a woman (as opposed to idealized concepts such as Liberty and Victory). A replica of this statue can also be found in Gloucester, Massachusetts. A reduced version is located at Longwood University in Farmville, Virginia.
1915	Paul Manship	Smithsonian American Art Museum	Medal, showing an equestrian figure on the obverse and a figure at the stake on the reverse.
After 1921		Matane, Quebec, church of St. Joan of Arc	Standing figure.
1922	Paul DuBois	Washington, D.C., Meridian Hill Park	Bronze copy of the statue by DuBois at Reims Cathedral. See Equestrian statue of Joan of Arc (Washington, D.C.).
1920		St. Louis Cathedral, New Orleans, Louisiana	Standing figure. It was donated to the cathedral by "The Sodality of Saint Joan of Arc."
cast 1924	Emmanuel Frémiet	Portland, Oregon, Laurelhurst neighborhood	Equestrian statue. It was erected as a tribute to the fallen soldiers of World War I and is a replica of the Frémiet statue at Place des Pyramides in Paris.
1947		Laval (Quebec)	Standing figure.
?	Lanson	Jargeau, France place du Martroy	Standing figure
?	?	Notre-Dame de Montréal Basilica – Montreal	Standing figure, to the left of the altar.
1972	Emmanuel Frémiet	Decatur Street, French Market – New Orleans, Louisiana	Equestrian statue. It was a gift from the People of France to the City of New Orleans and is a replica of the Frémiet statue at Place des Pyramides in Paris.
?	?	Eglise St-Pierre – Mont Saint-Michel – France	Standing figure, by the entrance to the church.

== Film and television ==
Date	title	country	Notes
1898	Jeanne d'Arc	France	short film directed by Georges Hatot
1900	Jeanne d'Arc	France	short film directed by Georges Méliès, starring Jeanne Calvière
1908	Jeanne d'Arc	France	directed by Albert Capellani, starring Léontine Massart
1908	Giovanna d'Arco	Italy	directed by Mario Caserini starring Maria Gasperini, based on Schiller's play
1913	Giovanna d'Arco	Italy	directed by Ubaldo Maria Del Colle starring Maria Jacobini
1917	Joan the Woman	US	directed by Cecil B. DeMille, starring Geraldine Farrar; set in the trenches of World War I
1921	The Four Horsemen of the Apocalypse	US	"The Spirit of France" Intertitle has an image of an Equestrian statue of Joan
1927	Saint Joan	US	directed by Widgey R. Newman, starring Sybil Thorndike. Based on a scene from Shaw's play.
1928	The Passion of Joan of Arc	France	directed by Carl Theodor Dreyer, starring Renée Jeanne Falconetti. Widely regarded as one of the greatest films of the silent era; initially banned in Britain.
1929	The Marvelous Life of Joan of Arc	France	directed by Marco de Gastyne, starring Simone Genevois
1935	Das Mädchen Johanna	Germany	directed by Gustav Ucicky, starring Angela Salloker
1944	De Jeanne d'Arc à Philippe Pétain	France	documentary narrated by Sacha Guitry
1948	Joan of Arc	US	directed by Victor Fleming, starring Ingrid Bergman, based on the Maxwell Anderson play
1952	Joan of Arc	US	Hallmark Hall of Fame television series episode
1954	Giovanna d'Arco al rogo	Italy	directed by Roberto Rossellini, starring Ingrid Bergman, based on the oratorio by Paul Claudel and Arthur Honegger
1954	Destinies	France	a film in sketches directed by Jean Delannoy, starring Michèle Morgan
1956	Jehanne	France	short film directed by Robert Enrico
1957	Saint Joan	US	directed by Otto Preminger, starring Jean Seberg, based on the George Bernard Shaw play
1957	The Story of Mankind	US	directed by Irwin Allen, featuring Hedy Lamarr as Joan. Based on a book by Hendrik Willem van Loon.
1957	The Lark	US	TV production of L'Alouette, starring Julie Harris, who played Joan on Broadway
1958	Saint Joan	UK	TV adaptation of Shaw's play, starring Siobhán McKenna
1958	The Lark	Australia	Australian adaptation of Anouihl's play, starring Beverley Dunn.
1960	Jeanne d'Arc auf dem Scheiterhaufen	Germany	movie for TV starring Margot Trooger, a version of the Honegger oratorio
1961	Jeanne au Vitrail	France	short film directed by Claude Antoine
1962	Procès de Jeanne d'Arc	France	directed by Robert Bresson, starring Florence Delay
1962	Histoire de Jeanne	France	short film directed by Francis Lacassin
1966	Der Fall Jeanne d'Arc	Germany	TV movie directed by Paul Verhoeven, starring Kathrin Schmid
1967	Saint Joan	United States	NBC television adaptation of Shaw's play, starring Geneviève Bujold
1968	St. Joan	UK	another television adaptation of Shaw's play, starring Janet Suzman
1970	The Beginning	USSR	directed by Gleb Panfilov, starring Inna Churikova
1978	Heilige Jeanne (Sacred Joan)	Netherlands	TV movie starring Rutger Hauer
1983	Joan of Arc	UK	with commentary by Marina Warner
1989	Bill & Ted's Excellent Adventure	US	Joan (Jane Wiedlin) and other historic figures are transported to San Dimas for a history project. Memorable lines include "Who was Joan of Arc?" "Noah's wife?" "Welcome aboard, Miss of Arc!"
1989	Giovanna d'Arco	Italy	Verdi's opera directed by Werner Herzog starring Susan Dunn, based on Schiller's play
1990	Jeanne d'Ark: Visjon Gjennom Eld	Norway	TV movie written by Juni Dahr
1993	Jeanne d'Arc au Bûcher	Japan	TV movie of the Honegger-Claudel oratorio (in French), starring Marthe Keller
1994	Jeanne la Pucelle	France	directed by Jacques Rivette, starring Sandrine Bonnaire
1999	The Messenger: The Story of Joan of Arc	France	directed by Luc Besson, starring Milla Jovovich, John Malkovich, Faye Dunaway and Dustin Hoffman
1999	Joan of Arc	Canada	TV mini-series starring Leelee Sobieski
1999	Wired Angel	US	directed by Sam Wells, music by Joe Renzetti
2004	Jeanne d'Arc	France	directed by Laurent Preyale
2011	The Silence of Joan (Fr. Jeanne captive)	France	directed by Philippe Ramos, featured Clémence Poésy as Joan
2011	Jeanne	Germany	directed by Shahram Varza, premiere São Paulo International Film Festival 2011
2015	Joan of Arc: God's Warrior	United Kingdom	documentary by Helen Castor, featured Georgia Moffett as Joan
2016	The Hollow Crown	United Kingdom	TV series adapted from Shakespeare's Henry VI, Part 1, appears in second series episode Henry VI, Part 1, portrayed by Laura Frances-Morgan
2017	Jeannette: The Childhood of Joan of Arc	France	directed by Bruno Dumont. Portrayed by Lise Leplat Prudhomme as a child and Jeanne Voisin as an older Jeannette.
2019	Joan of Arc	France	directed by Bruno Dumont; sequel to Jeannette: The Childhood of Joan of Arc. Lise Leplat Prudhomme reprises her role as Jeanne.
2024	Martin Scorsese Presents: The Saints	US	docudrama series hosted by Martin Scorsese, with Joan portrayed by Liah O'Prey

=== Television episodes ===
Date	Series	Notes	Ref
1972–1978	Maude	theme song includes 'Joan of Arc with the Lord to guide her/she was a sister who really cooked.'	
1979	M*A*S*H	"Are You Now, Margaret?", Hawkeye references Joan of Arc.	
1981	Taiyo Sentai Sun Vulcan	"The Cursed Dead" features Joan of Arc, Dracula and Billy the Kid resurrected to terrorize the titular team as they were souls never put to rest.	
1992	Forever Knight	"For I Have Sinned", Nicholas Knight (Geraint Wyn Davies) recalls his friendship with Jeanne d'Arc (Christina Cox) as he tries to overcome his fear of the holy cross in order to track down a blasphemous murderer.	
1995	Wishbone	"Bone of Arc" is based on Mark Twain's 1896 novel Personal Recollections of Joan of Arc	
1999	Buffy the Vampire Slayer	"Fear, Itself", in this Halloween-themed episode, Willow chose to dress up like Joan of Arc, because she was also (almost) burned at the stake in "Gingerbread".	
2001	Witchblade	"Parallax", Sara learns Joan of Arc wielded the Witchblade	
2003–2005	Joan of Arcadia	A girl speaks with God and uses His influence to do good	
2004	Wonderfalls	Series theme inspired by Joan of Arc	
2006–2007	Heroes	Features a character named St. Joan	
2010−2013	Horrible Histories	Series 2 features a sketch and series 5 features a song about Joan of Arc. Played by Alice Lowe and then Martha Howe-Douglas.	
2011	Deadliest Warrior	"Joan of Arc vs. William the Conqueror"	
2012	Fate/Zero	Appears as a vision to Caster class Servant Gilles de Rais ("Bluebeard") in the fifteenth episode. The design for Jeanne was reused from a cancelled project for an online game that would later be revived as a light novel series, Fate/Apocrypha.	
2016	The Hollow Crown	Portrayed by Laura Frances-Morgan in Henry VI, Part 1 (S02E01)	
2017	Fate/Apocrypha	Servant of the Ruler class (Voiced by: Maaya Sakamoto (Japanese); Erika Harlacher (English)). Adapted from the light novel series.	
2020	Devs	Joan of Arc is briefly seen in episode 3	
2022	Miraculous: Tales of Ladybug & Cat Noir	Marinette uses her Kwagatama, which allows her to talk to the memories of holders of the Ladybug Miraculous in the past. The one she chooses is Joan of Arc, who, when transformed, was known as the Scarlet Fate. She received her Miraculous around the time of the Hundred Years’ War.	

== In popular culture ==
=== Advertising ===
- Benetton's 1988 "United Superstars of Benetton" print and billboard campaign featured two models as Joan and as Marilyn Monroe
- Whoopi Goldberg played Joan in a 2010 commercial for Kimberly-Clark's Poise

=== Culinary ===
- B&G Foods's "Joan of Arc", a Canadian brand of tinned beans.

=== Fashion ===
Joan of Arc has often been depicted in fashion.

- Alexander McQueen, Joan, Spring/Summer 1998
- Balenciaga, Fall/Winter 2023 Couture
- Jean Paul Gaultier, Spring/Summer 1994
- John Galliano for Dior, Fall/Winter 2006 Couture
- Versace, 2018 Met Gala custom for Zendaya

=== Finance ===
- Jeanne D'Arc Credit Union (Lowell, Massachusetts).

=== Music ===
Date	Title	Artist/Group	Notes
1917	Joan of Arc	Henry Burr	Performed by Henry Burr on Columbia's label.
1917	Joan of Arc's Answer Song	J. L. Lavoy	The sheet music cover has an illustration of Joan of Arc on horseback with outstretched sword with soldiers of various nations charging underneath.
1917	Joan of Arc They Are Calling You	Jack Wells	The cover illustration for the sheet music to this song depicts Joan of Arc leading an attack.
1970	Songs of Love and Hate (album)	Leonard Cohen	Contains a song (released as a single in 1971) titled "Joan of Arc", and lyrics in the song "Last Year's Man" that refer to her: "I met a lady, she was playing with her soldiers in the dark, oh one by one she had to tell them that her name was Joan of Arc."
1975	"Kimberly" (song)	Patti Smith	From the album Horses, includes the lyrics, "The sea rushes up my knees like flame/ And I feel like just some misplaced Joan Of Arc."
1978	''Joan'' (song)	Art Bears	A song about Joan of Arc from Hopes and Fears that was also played by Henry Cow in 1977 (a recording can be found on Later and Post Virgin).
1981	Architecture & Morality (album)	Orchestral Manoeuvres in the Dark	Contains two songs about Joan of Arc titled "Joan of Arc" and "Joan of Arc (Maid of Orleans)", both were released as singles.
1984	"Eu Não Matei Joana d'Arc" (song)	Camisa de Vênus	Name of song means "I did not kill Joan of Arc". Humorous song where a man says that he never had an affair with Joan of Arc and is innocent in her death.
1986	"Bigmouth Strikes Again" (song)	The Smiths	Includes the lyrics, "And now I know how Joan of Arc felt, as the flames rose to her Roman nose and her Walkman started to melt", and "And now I know how Joan of Arc felt, as the flames rose to her Roman nose and her hearing aid started to melt."
1992	Destination (album)	Eloy	Contains a song titled "Jeanne d'Arc" about her life and fate.
1993	Houdini (album)	Melvins	Contains a song titled "Joan of Arc".
1994	Voices of Light (album)	Richard Einhorn	An oratorio inspired by the silent film The Passion of Joan of Arc. The libretto is based on excerpts from a variety of ancient writings, most of it from Medieval female mystics.
formed 1995	Joan of Arc	The name of an indie rock band from Chicago	
1995	"Vow" (song)	Garbage	Includes the lyrics, "You burned me out but I'm back at your door/ Like Joan of Arc coming back for more."
1998	"Joan of Arc (7")" (single)	Low (band)	Released on Tugboat Records
1998	"Siren" (album)	Heather Nova	Contains the song "I'm the Girl", in which Heather sings: "I'm a Joan of Arc, I'm the girl next door."
first release 1998	Janne Da Arc	Japanese rock band named after the character in the manga Devilman by Go Nagai	
1999	"She's So High" (song)	Tal Bachman	Includes the lyrics, "She's so high/ like Cleopatra, Joan of Arc, or Aphrodite", which speaks of the focus woman as being as smart as Cleopatra, as brave as Joan of Arc, and as beautiful as Aphrodite.
1999	"Right on Time" (song)	Red Hot Chili Peppers	From the album Californication, includes the lyrics, "Joan of Arc reincarnated/ Maybe we could be related/ So much blood to circulate/ And so much space to decorate."
2000	The Hall of the Olden Dreams (album)	Dark Moor	An album released from a Spanish power metal band. The album contains a song titled "Maid of Orleans", which is about the life of Joan of Arc.
2002	"Did Anybody Sleep With Joan of Arc?" (song)	Elton John (music), Bernie Taupin (lyrics)	A summary of Joan of Arc's life.
2002	"Free & Easy" (song)	Ayumi Hamasaki	Japanese singer and songwriter, based the lyrics and music video for her single on her interpretation of Joan of Arc's feelings. She also produced a photobook entitled Hamasaki Republic – Free & Easy where she was dressed as a warrior, a nun, and a knight.
2003	"Cadence" (song)	Anberlin	Includes the lyrics "Burning like Joan of Arc to See You", appearing on the band's debut album Blueprints for the Black Market.
2004	A Lifetime of Temporary Relief (album)	Low (band)	Minnesota-based indie rock band released two versions of their song "Joan of Arc."
2005	Plague Angel (album)	Marduk	Black metal band from Sweden, have a song entitled "Everything Bleeds", which is about Jeanne d'Arc.
2005	Aerial (album)	Kate Bush	Sings about Joan of Arc in "Joanni."
2005	Jeanne d'Arc (album)	Thy Majestie	Concept album about Joan of Arc by a power metal band from Italy.
2005	Jeanne d'Arc (album)	Tangerine Dream	Musical tribute to Joan of Arc performed on the occasion of the 300th anniversary of the French Cathedral in Berlin.
2006	"World of Stone" (song)	Blackmore's Night	The song is about Joan of Arc, appearing on their 5th studio album, The Village Lanterne.
2006	Joan of Arc (album)	Tony Conrad	Joan of Arc is a 2006 album by composer Tony Conrad. The piece, which lasts unbroken for over an hour, was originally written by Conrad as a soundtrack to accompany Piero Heliczer's eponymous short film.
2006	"The Martyr's Lounge" (song)	Ellis Paul	Includes the lyrics, "JFK, Joan of Arc / sit in the corner, kissing in the dark".
2006	The Black Parade (album)	My Chemical Romance	Joan of Arc appears of the artwork of the vinyl cover, and the CD insert
2007	"Joan of Arc" (song)	David Guetta	12th song on the album Pop Life
2007	The Historical Conquests of Josh Ritter (album)	Josh Ritter	The song "To the Dogs or Whoever" (the album's opening track) mentions Joan of Arc and other historical women
2008	"鏡の中のジャンヌ・ダルク" ("Kagami no Naka no Jean d'Arc", song)	AKB48	The ninth song in a theater setlist titled Pajama Drive, later also performed by its sister groups; SKE48, NMB48, HKT48, and JKT48.
2008	Godspeed on the Devil's Thunder (album)	Cradle of Filth	A concept album about the life of Joan of Arc's companion-in-arms Gilles de Rais, in which she is a central character.
2008	"Joan" (song)	Heather Dale	The fifth track on her fourth studio album, The Gabriel Hounds. Joan sings the story of her own life and crusade.
2008	"Lenders In The Temple" (song)	Conor Oberst	Includes the lyrics "So watch your back, the Ides of March, Cut your hair like Joan of Arc"
2010	"Pearl" (song)	Katy Perry	Includes the lyrics "She could be a Joan of Arc"
2013	"Joan of Arc" (song)	Arcade Fire	The seventh track in Arcade Fire's fourth studio album Reflektor.
2013	"Miley Cyrus vs Joan of Arc" (song)	Epic Rap Battles of History	Singer and actress Miley Cyrus (Michelle Glavan) battles French folk heroine Joan of Arc (Jessi Smiles).
2014	"Saint Joan" (song)	Husky (band)	The second track in Husky's second album Ruckers Hill.
2015	"Joan of Arc" (song)	Madonna	The eight song on Madonna's album Rebel Heart.
2015	"Jeanne d'Arc"	Wednesday Campanella	The fifth song on the album Jugem' Je t'aime
2016	"Joanni" (song)	Kate Bush	Before The Dawn Live performance
2017	The Vision, the Sword and the Pyre – Part I (album)	Eloy	Initial part of a two-part conceptual album about the life and fate of Jeanne d'Arc
2018	"Joan of Arc" (Little Mix song)	Little Mix	The sixth song from their fifth studio album "LM5".
2019	The Vision, the Sword and the Pyre – Part II (album)	Eloy	Final part of the two-part conceptual album about the fate and death of Jeanne d'Arc
2024	"Joan in the Garden" (song)	The Decemberists	Released as a single and as side D of their double album As It Ever Was, So It Will Be Again
2024	Good Luck, Babe (song)	Chappell Roan	Depicted Joan of Arc in live performance of Good Luck, Babe! at the 2024 MTV Video Music Awards
2024	Joan Of Arc	Powerwolf	The eighth song on their album Wake Up the Wicked
2025	Maid Of Steel	Sabaton (band)	The sixth song on their album Legends (Sabaton album) tells the story of Jeanne d'Arc.

=== Video games ===
Date	Game	Notes
1989	Joan of Arc – Siege and the Sword / Jeanne d'Arc	Historically based war strategy and action game by Broderbund for Amiga, ST and PC.
1992	World Heroes series	NeoGeo fighting game. The character Janne D'Arc, a beautiful French swordswoman with pyrokinetic powers, is very much inspired by Joan of Arc.
1995	Soul Edge	Fighting game released by Namco about a sword full of evil spirits. The character Sophitia Alexandra shares a similar story to Joan of Arc, although they both eventually meet and bond with each other in Warriors Orochi 3 Ultimate.
1999	Age of Empires II: The Age of Kings	The central character in one of the major campaigns in which she is depicted as a peasant at first but follows a historically driven plot leading to her capture and death.
2000	Perfect Dark	Nintendo 64 game. Whilst in no way is the game about Joan, the central character Joanna Dark's name is a play on Jeanne d'Arc.
2001	Civilization III	The Leader of France's civilization is Joan of Arc.
2002	La Pucelle: Tactics	PlayStation game. The title is an allusion to Joan of Arc. Most of the character and place names within the game are French, but the game scenario is unrelated fantasy.
2004	Wars and Warriors: Joan of Arc	PC game, title character.
2006	Age of Empires: The Age of Kings	Nintendo DS game major playable character.
2006	Jeanne d'Arc	PSP game, title character (voiced by Kari Wahlgren) in a fantasy universe loosely based on the historical story. Part way through the game, Jeanne is lost and her friend Liane assumes Jeanne's identity to continue fighting. Liane is captured and ultimately burned by the English, who believe her to be Jeanne. The true Jeanne is revealed to have survived and anonymously returns to avenge Liane.
2006, 2008	Yggdra Union	Game Boy Advance/PSP game. Minor character Monica, a peasant girl who receives divine inspiration and rises up to defend her country from invasion, is based on Joan of Arc.
2007	Bladestorm: The Hundred Years' War	PS3 game, Xbox 360 game, major character and leader of the French troops.
2008	Atlantica Online	PC MMORPG, Hero Mercenary, evolved form of "Lady Knight" Mercenary
2009	Assassin's Creed II	PS3/Xbox 360/PC action game. It is claimed that she had the 25th Piece of Eden, the Sword, and the Templars burned her alive to gain possession of it.
2009	Dragon Age	Andraste, a messianic figure in the game world who is both a religious and military leader, is partially based upon Joan of Arc.
2010	Bayonetta	PS3/Xbox 360/PC game contains a character named Jeanne who acts as Bayonetta's rival. She also possesses some references to the real life Joan of Arc, with her trademark red outfit being the product of the fictional Italian fashion brand D'arc.
2011	Deadliest Warrior: Legends	PS3/Xbox 360 game. Historical warriors engage in one-on-one fighting; Joan of Arc is playable through downloadable content.
2012	Warriors Orochi 3	PS3/Xbox 360 hack and slash game, Joan's Bladestorm: The Hundred Years' War incarnation appears as a special guest character and is involved in the plot to save the world from destruction. In Ultimate update game, this is where Joan and Sophitia met and shares their bonds each other.
2013	Angel Master (エンジェルマスター, Enjeru Masutā)	This iOS and Android card action game contains a character named Jeanne d'Arc (ジャンヌ・ダルク, Jan'nu Daruku), who is one of the game's three main characters.
2015	Fate/Grand Order	Appears as a summonable servant in the Ruler, Avenger, Lancer, Archer, and Berserker classes. Also appears in the First Singularity: Hundred Years' War of the First Dragons: Orleans as the main ally (In Ruler class) of the player and the antagonist of the singularity, The Dragon Witch (Ruler), who was summoned by Caster (Gilles de Rais) using the Holy Grail.
2018	Dragalia Lost	Appears as a summonable dragon of the light element along with having a holiday alt of the water element. Also appears as a void boss and later a Gala Reborn dragon.
2026	Castlevania: Belmont's Curse	Appears as a boss fight. Afterwards grants the protagonist the ability to parry and use a flame attack.

=== Comics and animation ===
Date	Title	Format	Notes	Ref
1995	Jeanne	Manga	Three comic volume work set in the Hundred Years' War whose central character's life parallels that of Joan of Arc. By Yoshikazu Yasuhiko, based on story by Chōjun Ōtani	
1995–1996	D'arc: Histoire de Jeanne D'arc	Manga	Two volume fantasy retelling the story of Joan of Arc. Art by Katsuya Kondō and story by Ken'ichi Sakemi.	
1995–present	Witchblade	Comic, TV series	Joan of Arc is a blade wielder.	
1998–2000	Histeria!	Animation	WB animated series that parodies a variety of figures from history. Joan of Arc is a regular character, voiced by Laraine Newman. She constantly extinguishes fires that spring up around her. She talks with a Valley Girl accent and introduces herself as "like, I'm Joan, Joan of Arc".	
1998–2004	Shaman King	Anime	The leader of the group X-Laws, Iron Maiden Jeanne, is a French girl who receives a divine revelation while praying in church that she must purge an evil force or the world will be destroyed.	
17 March 2002	The Simpsons	Animation	In episode "Tales from the Public Domain", Lisa Simpson plays Joan of Arc and Milhouse plays the Dauphin, after Homer reads about her in a children's book. However, when Homer gets to the part where she was burned at the stake, Lisa says, "Was she killed?" and Marge runs in and says, "Just then, Sir Lancelot rode up on his white horse and saved Joan of Arc! They got married and lived in a spaceship!" She then tore the page out, ate it, and says, "Easier to chew than that Bambi video!"	
2002–ongoing	Clone High	Animation	Joan of Arc's clone appears as a main character in the traditionally animated show.	
2003	Digimon	Anime	The seventh movie of the Digimon series features a Digimon named D'Arcmon (voiced by Takako Uehara) who is a female angel and soldier leading the "human-type" Digimon on Wondering Island. She uses a special sword attack called "La Pucelle". She later is revealed only to be a disguised form of Murmuxmon.	
2003	Yu-Gi-Oh!	Anime, TCG	In the Yu-Gi-Oh! Trading Card game there is a monster card named St. Joan (Saint Jeanne in Japan). It is summoned by fusing The Forgiving Maiden (Compassionate Nun) and Marie the Fallen One (Fallen Angel Marie). In the anime Yu-Gi-Oh! Duel Monsters, Serenity Wheeler (Shizuka Kawai) used it when she, Tristan Taylor (Hiroto Honda), and Duke Devlin (Ryuji Otogi) were forced to face Nesbitt (Soichiro Ota) of the Big Five. With power ups from other cards it was able to destroy Nesbitt's last monster, the Perfect Machine King, and win the duel in episode 107 "Mechanical Mayhem Part 2" ("Saint Jeanne's Trinity Attack").	
2003	Ashita no Nadja	Anime	Nadja, Kennosuke, and Georg are treasure hunting for Joan of Arc's treasure. It turns out to be a seed that she planted that bloomed and spread into a field of flowers. She is briefly shown planting it in a flashback.	
2003–2009	Hetalia: Axis Powers	Manga and Anime	In a brief flashback to the Hundred Years' War, Joan of Arc (often known only as あのこ or "that kid" in-story) looks on in confusion while the anthropomorphic personification of England teases the anthropomorphic personification of France for "relying on a girl". Several centuries later, her supposed reincarnation is given a private tour of Mont Saint-Michel by France.	
2005	Top 10: The Forty-Niners	Comic	One of the officers, named Joanna Dark, dresses in chainmail and uses holy powers.	
2006	Aflame Inferno	Manhwa/Manga	Joan of Arc appears as a character in the series.	
2007–09	Code Geass: Nightmare of Nunally	Manga	Joan of Arc appears as the "Witch of Orleans" and gives C.C. her Geass. Her personality is different from real life. Portions of this page were translated from the French Wikipedia.	
2008-ongoing	Aria the Scarlet Ammo	Manga	A character of the series is Jeanne d'Arc 30th who is a descendant of the original Joan of Arc.	
2009-ongoing	Drifters	Manga	Jeanne d'Arc (voiced by Junko Minagawa) appears as an "Ends", a villainous group of fallen historical figures who wish to destroy the world and exterminate humankind. In the series, Joan is an insane warrior who has exchanged her humanity for the supernatural ability to manipulate fire.	
2009-ongoing	Afterschool Charisma	Manga	Currently at four volumes, this series takes place at an exclusive school called St. Kleio Academy that is mostly attended by clones of famous people. Joan of Arc's clone appears along with clones of other important people such as Napoleon Bonaparte, Queen Elizabeth I, Florence Nightingale, Marie Curie, Ikkyu, Sigmund Freud and others.	
2009-ongoing	Makai Ouji: Devils and Realist	Manga and Anime	Portrayed as the former lover of Gilles de Rais and as an angel, having been purified, suggesting that she was once evil.	
2010–present	Times Like This	Webcomic	In this time-travel series, Joan is rescued during her execution and brought to modern Texas to live out her full life as a secondary character in the series.	
2011	Puella Magi Madoka Magica	Anime	In Episode 11 it is revealed that she was a magical girl, along with Cleopatra and other famous women in history.	
2012	Family Guy	Animation	In the Season 10 Episode 19 "Mr. and Mrs. Stewie", Joan of Arc is depicted as obnoxious and annoying in a cutaway after Stewie notes that women always turn out to be nightmares.	
2013–present	Rooster Teeth Productions RWBY	Animation	In the series, the leader of Team JNPR, Jaune Arc, wielder of the Crocea Mors, is derived of the legend of Joan of Arc. While his characterization and history is different from Joan of Arc's, his rival is Cardin Winchester, an allusion to the Cardinal of Winchester who presided over Joan of Arc's trial.	
2013	Makai Ouji: Devils and Realist	Anime	Portrayed as the former lover of Gilles de Rais and as an angel, having been purified, suggesting that she was once evil.	
2013	Rage of Bahamut: Genesis	Anime	In the series, she's the "chosen one" by the gods to destroy Bahamut; a giant dragon.	
2013	Boxers and Saints	Comic	In the two-part series, Joan appears in the Saints volume as a mentor for the Chinese Christian convert Vibiana (Four-Girl).	
2013–2017	Puella Magi Tart Magica: The Legend of Jeanne d'Arc	Manga	Based on the anime Puella Magi Madoka Magica, which showed she was a magical girl, along with other famous women in history in episode 11. The manga chronicles her time of becoming a magical girl to her becoming the legendary warrior of France to her eventual demise of being burned at the stake.	
2013–present	Requiem of the Rose King	Manga and Anime	Inspired by William Shakespeare's Henry VI and Richard III, the series depicts the deceased Joan of Arc as an almost demonic spirit who haunts the young Richard of Gloucester, later King of England.	
2014–2020	Revelation: Keiji	Manga	A series depicting the life of Joan of Arc. Written and illustrated by Ryoko Yamagishi.	
2021	Fate/Grand Order: Final Singularity – Grand Temple of Time: Solomon	Anime	Briefly appears as a servant during a battle. Movie is a part of the Fate/Grand Order series.	

== In philately ==
Date	Country	Yvert n°
1929	France	257
1946	France	768
1968	France	1579
1979	France	2051
1996	France	3002
2012	France	4654

== Other representations ==
Joan of Arc's short haircut had a profound effect on women's hairstyles in the twentieth century. In 1909, the Paris hairdresser Antoine took Joan of Arc as the inspiration for the bob, which ended centuries of taboo against women who cut their hair. The style became popular in the 1920s and was associated with liberated women. Nearly all subsequent Western hair fashions are designed for women who cut their hair at least occasionally. Such haircut is still known in French as coupe à la Jeanne d'Arc (Joan of Arc's haircut).

During the Cristero War in 1927, a group of female Cristeros named themselves after Joan of Arc. They obtained money, supplies, and intelligence for the male combatants. They often smuggled weapons into war zones and cared for the wounded. By the end of the war they had 35,000 participants.

Several people have been seen as modern versions of Joan of Arc:

- Malalai of Maiwand, called the "Afghan Joan of Arc"
- Tringe Smajl Martini, referred to as "The Albanian Joan of Arc"
- Lalla Fatma N'Soumer, referred to as "The Joan of Arc of Kabylie"
- Ani Pachen, referred to as "The Tibetan Joan of Arc"
- Sarah Taylor, referred to as "The Tennessee Joan of Arc"
- Triệu Thị Trinh, referred to as "The Vietnamese Joan of Arc"
- Emilia Plater, referred to as "The Polish Joan of Arc"
- Teresa Magbanua, The referred to as "The Visayan Joan of Arc"
- Maria Quitéria, referred to as " The Brazilian Joan of Arc"
- Greta Thunberg, referred to as "the Joan of Arc of the environment"

== See also ==
- History of film
- Middle Ages in film

== Notes ==
1. Pernoud 1999, p. 243.
2. Pernoud 1999, p. 239.
3. Pernoud 1999, pp. 240, 246.
