= National epic =

Literary work that is central to a nation's identity

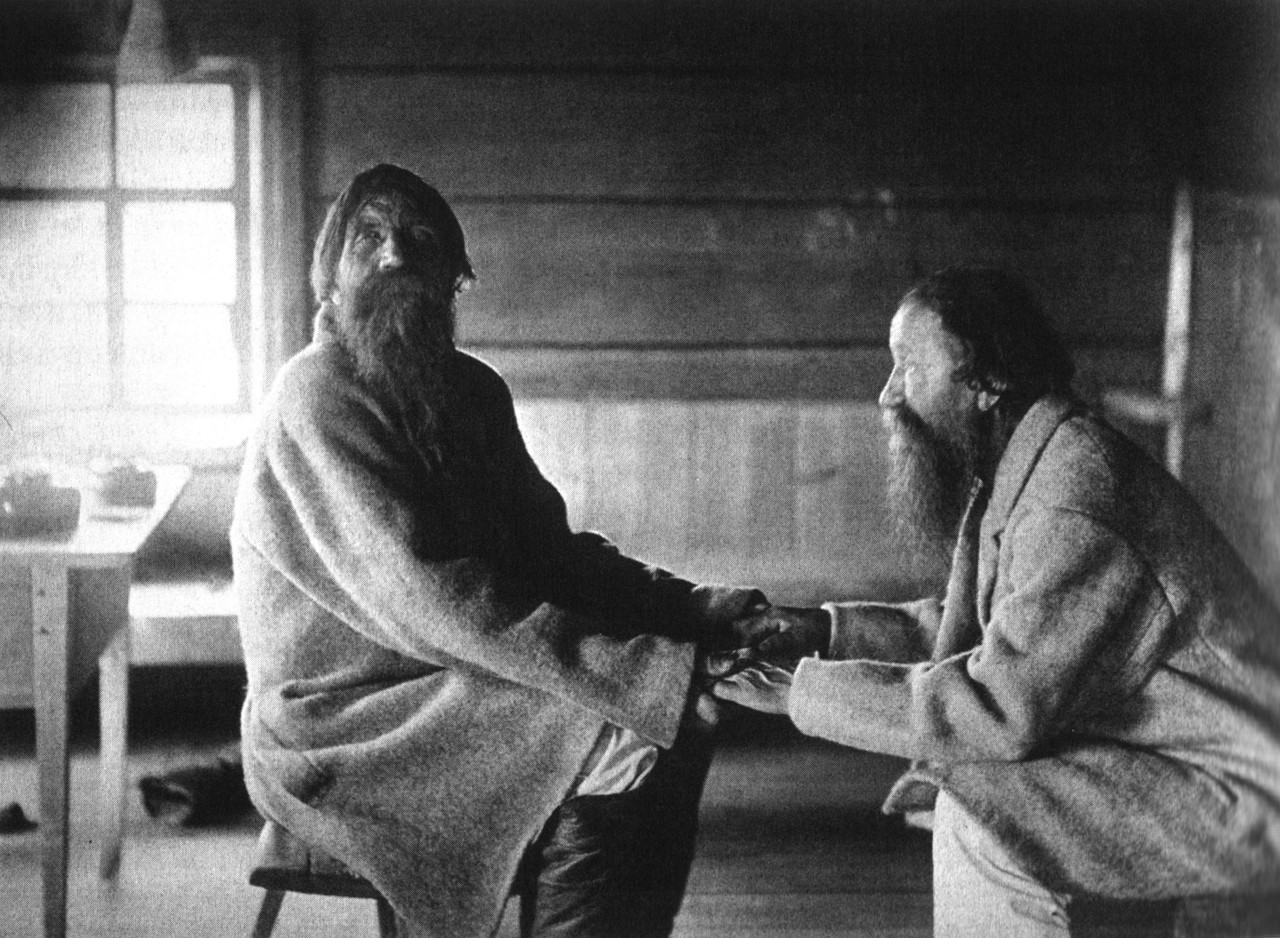
Karelian poem singing brothers Poavila and Triihvo Jamanen reciting traditional Finnish folk poetry, Russia, 1894.

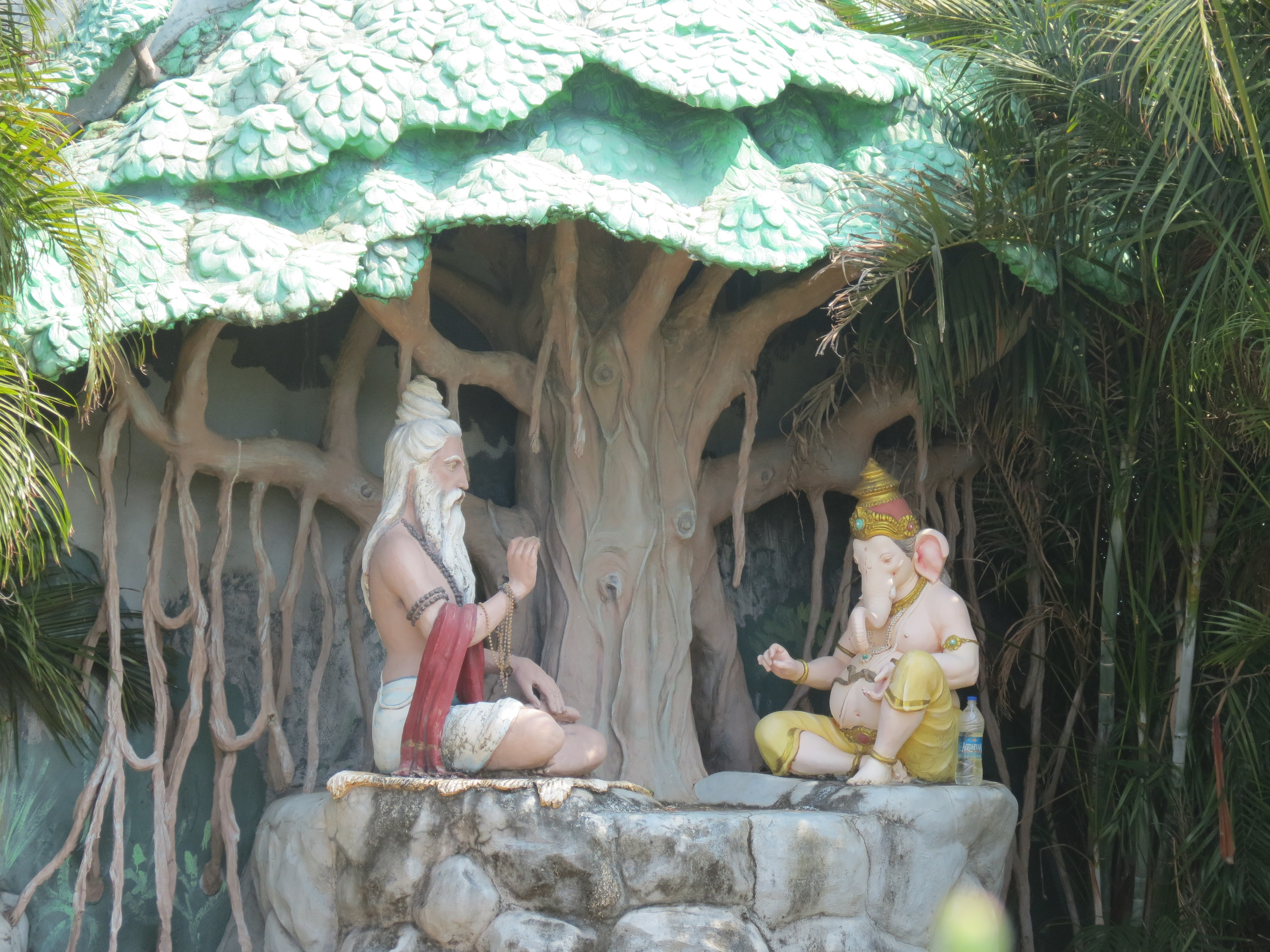
Modern depiction of Vyasa narrating the Mahabharata to Ganesha at the Murudeshwara temple, Karnataka.

A national epic is an epic poem or a literary work of epic scope which seeks to or is believed to capture and express the essence or spirit of a particular nation—not necessarily a nation state, but at least an ethnic or linguistic group with aspirations to independence or autonomy. National epics frequently recount the origin of a nation, a part of its history, or a crucial event in the development of national identity such as other national symbols.

== History ==
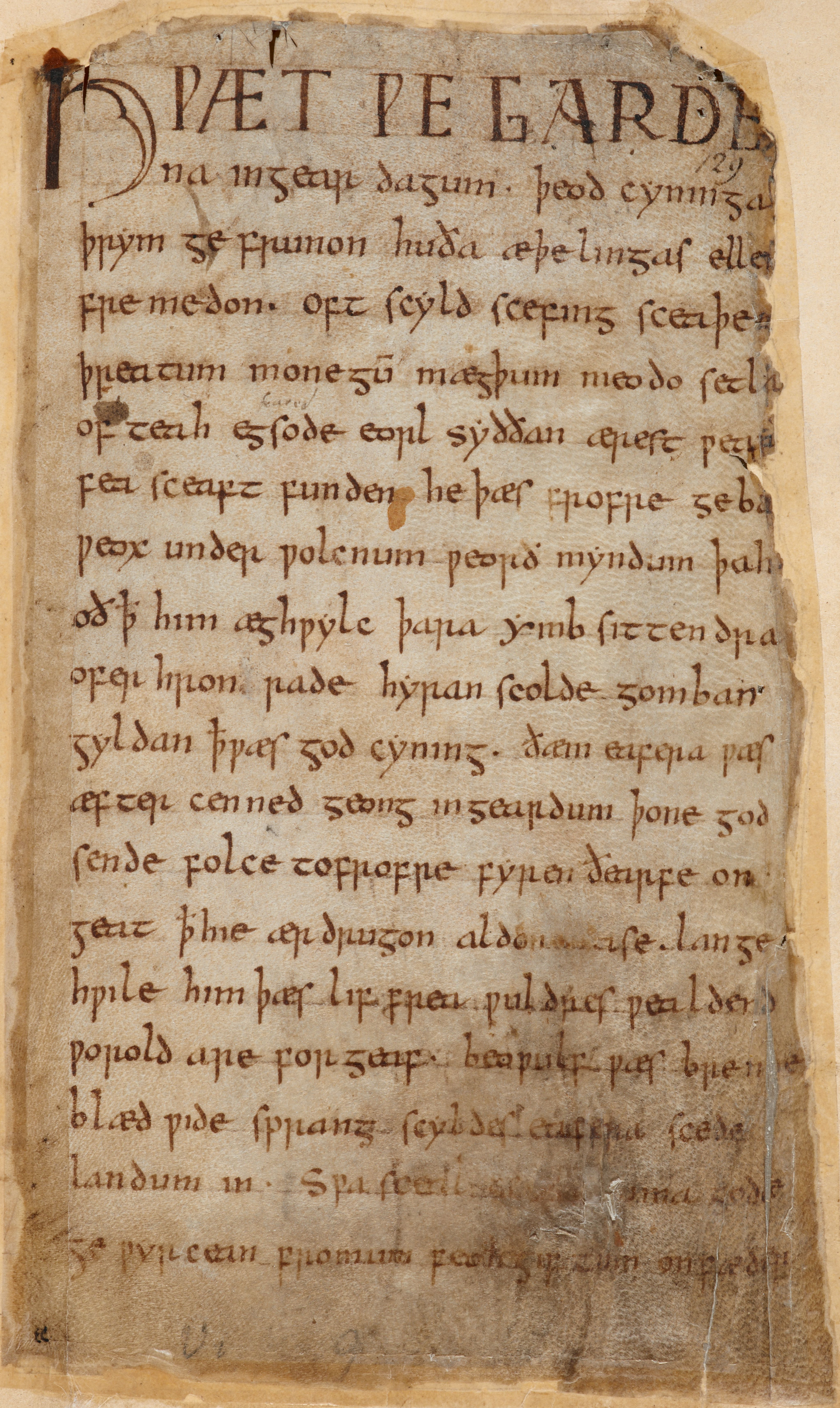
First page of Beowulf in Cotton Vitellius A. xv

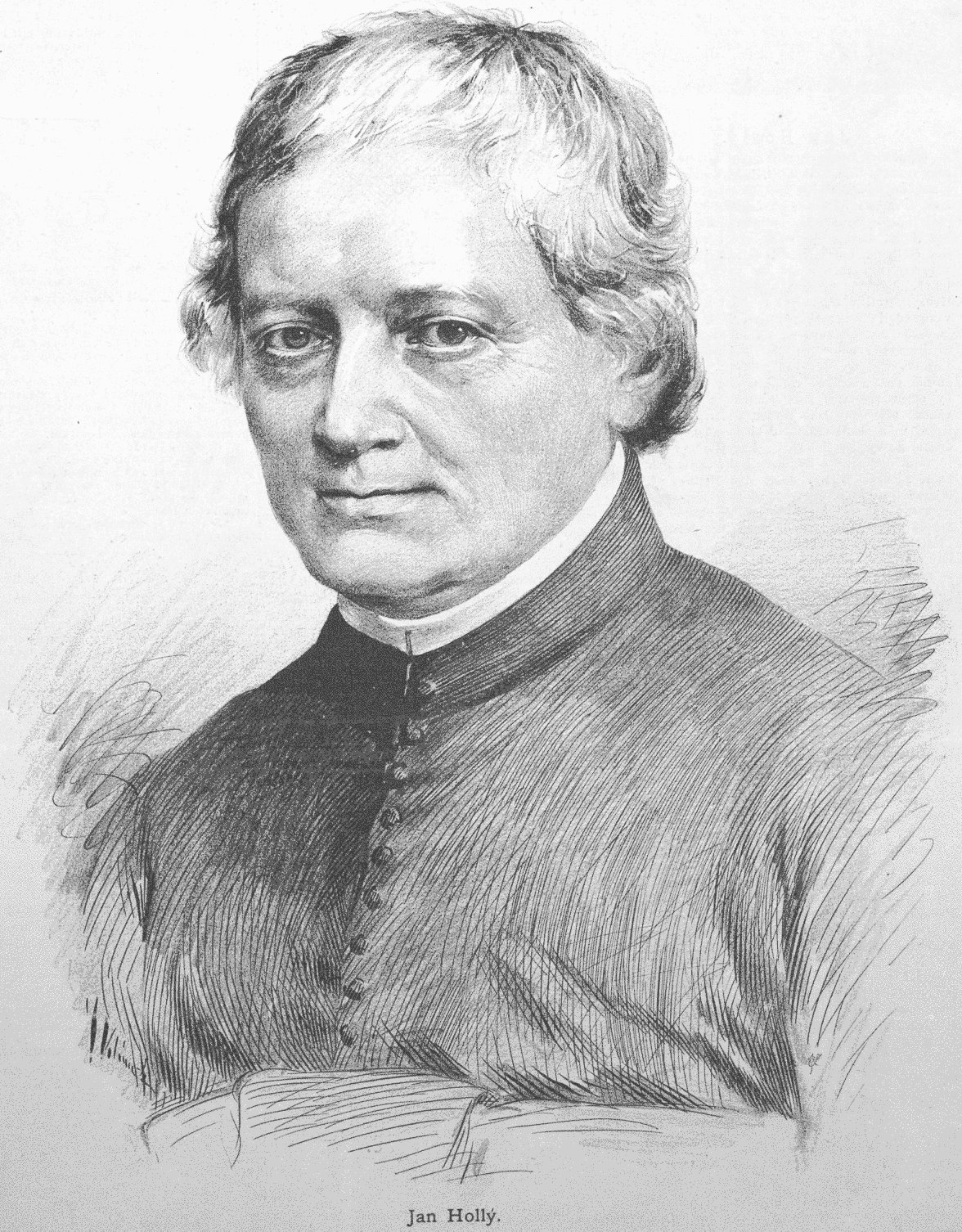
Ján Hollý – author of the Slovak national epic poem Svatopluk.

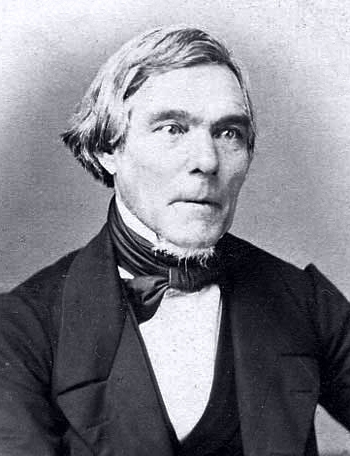
Elias Lönnrot – author of the Finnish national epic poem Kalevala.

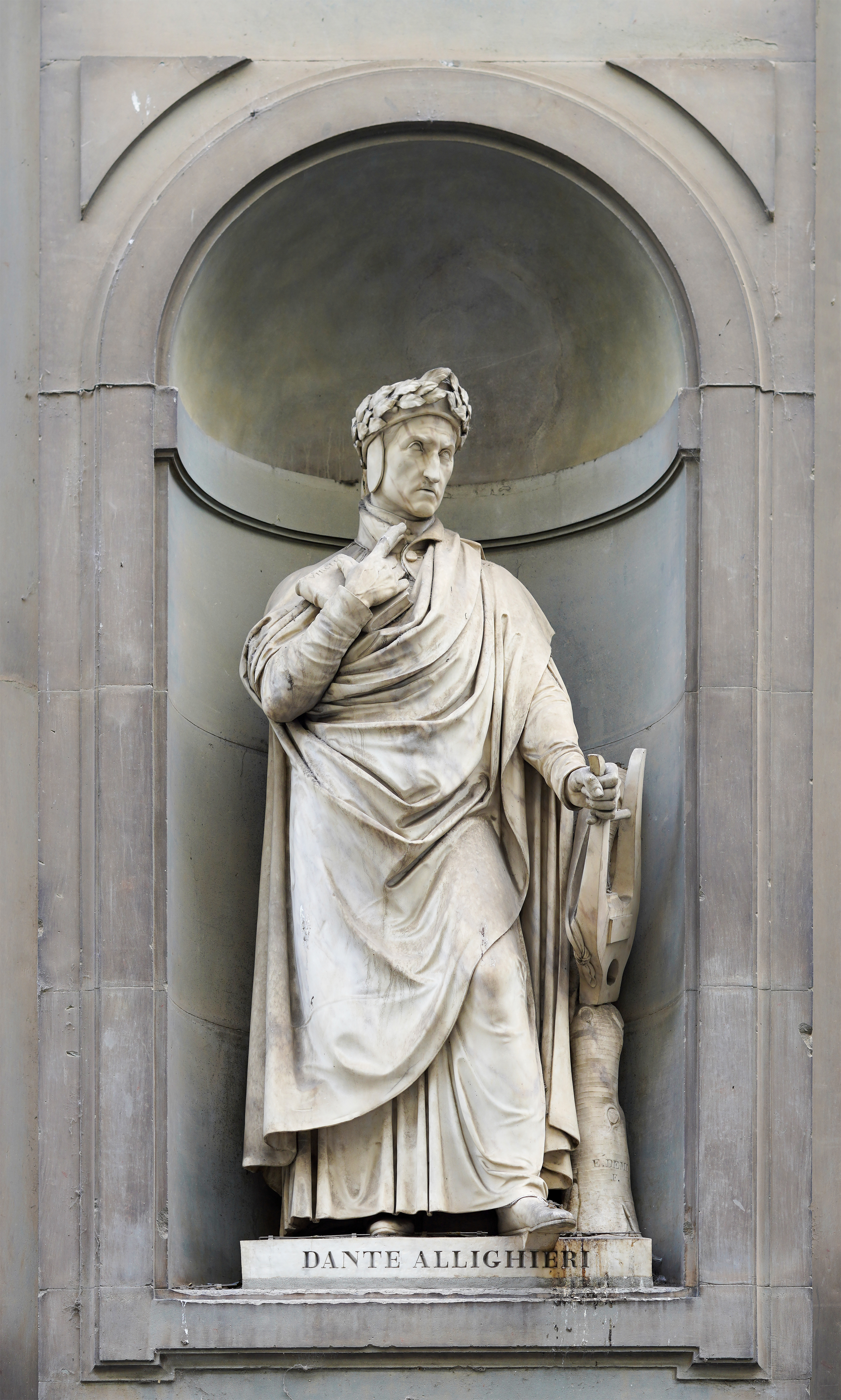
Dante Alighieri – author of the Divine Comedy.

In medieval times Homer's Iliad was taken to be based on historical facts, and the Trojan War came to be considered as seminal in the genealogies of European monarchies. Virgil's Aeneid was taken to be the Roman equivalent of the Iliad, starting from the Fall of Troy and leading up to the birth of the young Roman nation. According to the then-prevailing conception of history, empires were born and died in organic succession and correspondences existed between the past and the present. Geoffrey of Monmouth's 12th-century classically inspired Historia Regum Britanniae, for example, fulfilled this function for the British or Welsh. Just as kings longed to emulate great leaders of the past, Alexander or Caesar, it was a temptation for poets to become a new Homer or Virgil. In 16th-century Portugal, Luís de Camões celebrated Portugal as a naval power in his Os Lusíadas while Pierre de Ronsard set out to write La Franciade, an epic meant to be the Gallic equivalent of Virgil's poem that also traced back France's ancestry to Trojan princes.

The emergence of a national ethos, however, preceded the coining of the phrase national epic, which seems to originate with Romantic nationalism. Where no obvious national epic existed, the "Romantic spirit" was motivated to fill it. An early example of poetry that was invented to fill a perceived gap in "national" myth is Ossian, the narrator and supposed author of a cycle of poems by James Macpherson, which Macpherson claimed to have translated from ancient sources in Scottish Gaelic. However, many national epics (including Macpherson's Ossian) antedate 19th-century romanticism.

Adam Mickiewicz's Pan Tadeusz (1834) is often considered the last epic poem in European literature.

Since the early 20th century, the phrase has no longer necessarily applied to an epic poem, and occurs to describe a literary work that readers and critics agree is emblematical of the literature of a nation, without necessarily including details from that nation's historical background. In this context the phrase has definitely positive connotations, as for example in James Joyce's Ulysses where it is suggested Don Quixote is Spain's national epic while Ireland's remains as yet unwritten:

They remind one of Don Quixote and Sancho Panza. Our national epic has yet to be written, Dr Sigerson says. Moore is the man for it. A knight of the rueful countenance here in Dublin.

== See also ==
- National poet
- Civil religion
- Epic film
- Epic poetry
- Founding myth
- Great American Novel
- List of national poets
- List of world folk-epics
- National myth
- Philippe-Alexandre Le Brun de Charmettes
- Encyclopedic novel
