= I, Joan =

2022 British stage play presenting Joan of Arc as a non-binary person

I, Joan is a 2022 British play that premiered at Shakespeare's Globe. Written by Charlie Josephine and directed by Ilinca Radulian, the play is a retelling of the story of Joan of Arc. It presents Joan of Arc as a non-binary person.

== Cast ==
- Joan of Arc: Isobel Thom
- Charles: Jolyon Coy
- Marie: Janet Etuk
- Thomas: Adam Gillen
- Yolande: Debbie Korley
- Dunois: Jonah Russell

== Themes ==
Michelle Terry, the artistic director of Shakespeare's Globe, stated that the play continued in Shakespeare's efforts to take "figures of the past to ask questions about the world around him" and to play "with identity, power, with the idea of pleasure, and with all sides of an argument."

== Reception ==
Anya Ryan of The Guardian gave the play four out of five stars, saying that it was "performed with kinetic vigour" and was "a refined lesson in the trans experience: the horrors of having to explain your being, the sense of misplacement, but with beauty and wonder too." Isobel Lewis of The Independent also gave the play four stars, saying that it "makes nuanced, incredibly complex points about gender and the way the so-called 'trans debate' has pitted trans and cis women against each other."

Claire Allfree of The Telegraph was more critical of the play, giving it two stars, saying that "the idea of Joan as trans is a fertile subject for drama and discussion" but that the play "largely reduces the spiritual and political nature of Joan’s militaristic fervour to glib, empty proclamations."

== See also ==
- Cultural depictions of Joan of Arc
