= Joan of Arc's Answer Song =

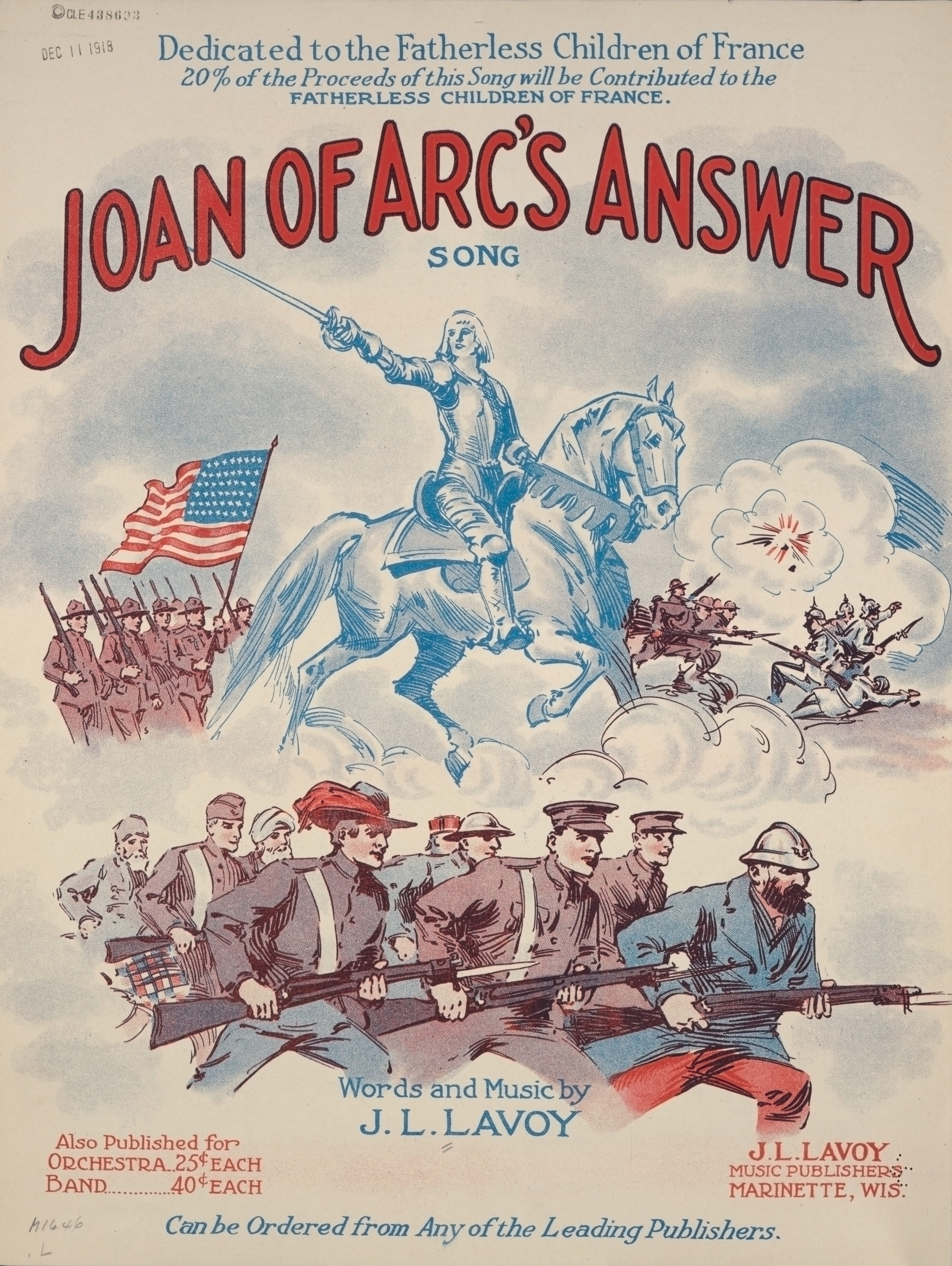
- Cover of sheet music for "Joan of Arc's Answer Song"

Song
- Language: English
- Released: 1918
- Songwriter: J.L. Lavoy
- Producer: J.L. Lavoy Music Publishers

Joan of Arc's Answer Song is a World War I song released in 1918. J.L. Lavoy is credited as the composer and lyricist. The song was published by J.L. Lavoy Music Publishers. It was written for both voice and piano. The lyrics are written in first person, and mentions the saint "Joan of Arc" once by name. The chorus addresses France specifically, and assures the country that America stands with them.

Dear old France with
list'ning ear and aching heart
I hear you calling

My word to you in this great hour of need
is "Do not falter,"'
For America with millions strong is near at hand.

On the cover of the sheet music is a drawing of Joan of Arc on a horse, with her sword drawn. Soldiers marching into battle are featured to the left and the foreground.

The song was dedicated to the "Fatherless Children of France" and a portion of the proceeds of sales of the sheet music went to supporting these children.
