= French ship Jeanne d'Arc =

A number of ships of the French Navy have borne the name Jeanne d'Arc, in honour of Joan of Arc. They include the following ships:

- French frigate Jeanne d'Arc (1820), a 52-gun frigate (1820–1834) built in Brest. She was the flagship of the Caribbean squadron.
- French frigate Jeanne d'Arc (1837), a 42-gun frigate (1837–1865), commissioned in 1852. She took part in the Crimean War. Renamed Prudente in 1865, decommissioned in 1898
- French corvette Jeanne d'Arc, an armoured corvette (1867–1885) built in Cherbourg
- French cruiser Jeanne d'Arc (1899), a cruiser built in 1901
- French cruiser Jeanne d'Arc (1930), a light cruiser built in 1930
- French cruiser Jeanne d'Arc (R97), a helicopter cruiser

Since 1912, it has been a tradition of the French Navy that the main school ship for officers be named Jeanne d'Arc.
