= Jean-Jacques Scherrer =

French painter

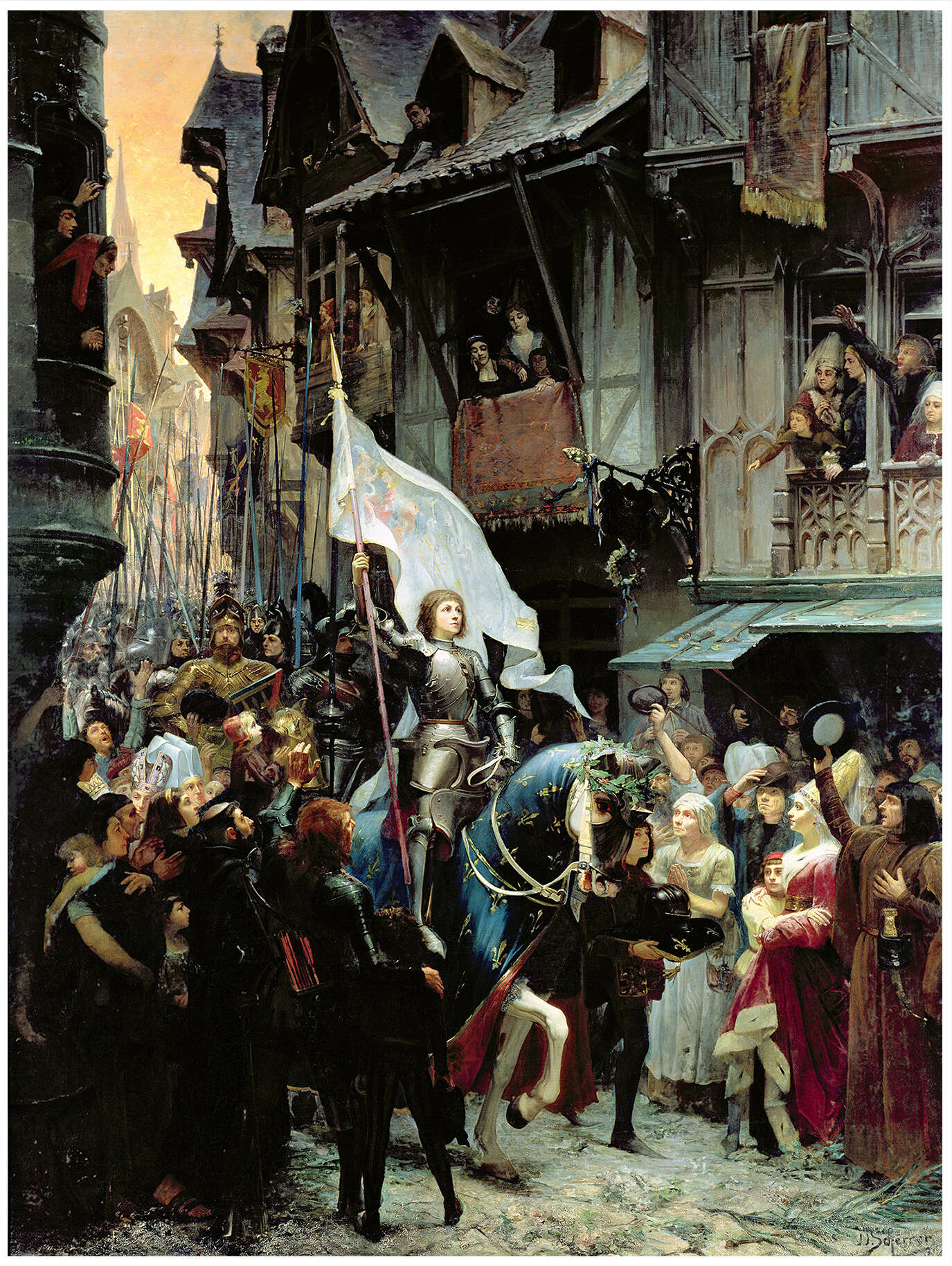
Jean-Jacques Scherrer: Entrée de Jeanne d'Arc à Orléans (1887)

Jean-Jacques Scherrer (1855–1916) was a French academic painter. Now largely forgotten, his historical paintings earned him considerable attention in his day.

== Early life ==
Born in Lutterbach in Alsace, Scherrer was brought up by his uncle following the death of his father when he was only 6 years old. After leaving school, he worked at the Haeffley factory in Pfastatt where his talent for drawing was noticed by one of the directors. In 1871, after the Treaty of Frankfurt he chose French nationality and moved to Paris where he was taught by Pierre-Jules Cavelier in the studio of Félix-Joseph Barrias. Barrias encouraged him to continue his studies at the École des Beaux-Arts where he came under the guidance of Alexandre Cabanel, whose academic style he closely followed.

== Career ==
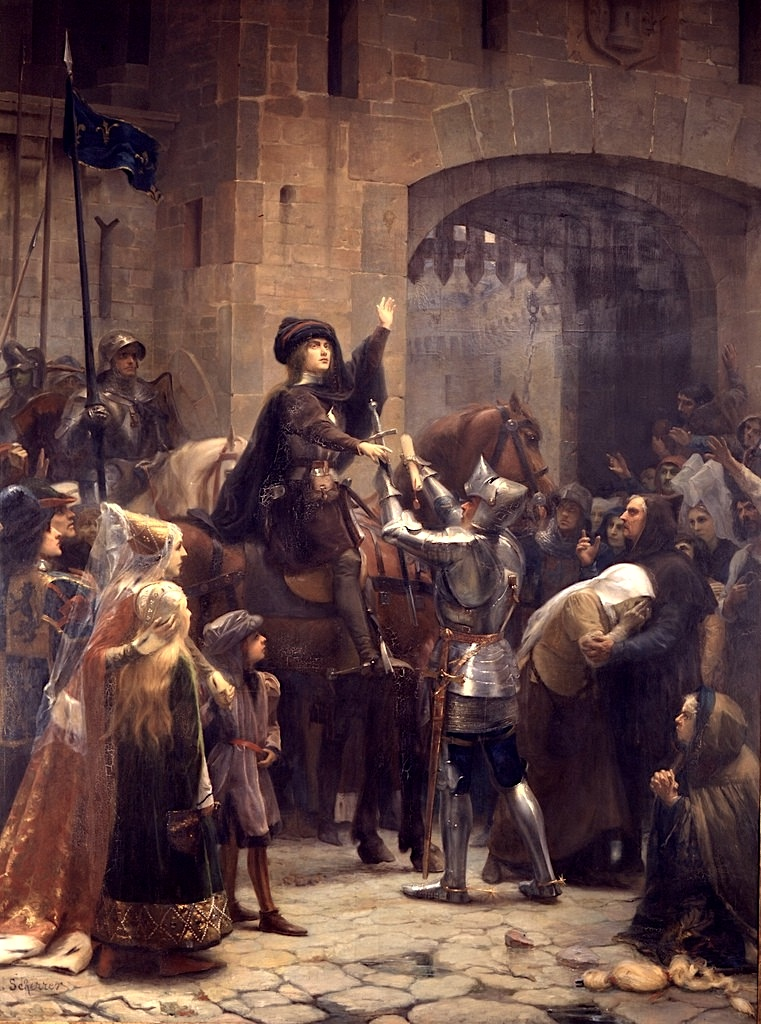
Le Départ de Vaucouleurs, painted between 1886 and 1887

Although Scherrer began to exhibit in 1877, it was his Résurrection du fils de la veuve de Naïm at the Salon de l'Académie de Peinture which established his reputation. In 1881, his painting L'Assassinat du maréchal Brune was received with particular success, earning him a stipendium which allowed him to spend two years in Italy. On his return to Paris in 1883, he painted Beaurepaire, la capitulation de Verdun, le 2 septembre 1792. He went on to receive awards for L'Entrée de Jeanne d'Arc à Orléans, victorieuse des Anglais (1887) and Isabeau de Bavière (1889), exhibited the same year at the Exposition Universelle, and Charlotte Corday à Caen (1892). At the end of the century, after decorating the SEITA pavilion for the Exposition Universelle (1900), he was made a knight of the Legion of Honour.

In addition to his academic works which were painted with almost photographic precision, Scherrer also painted nudes and copied the works of Raphaël in Italy and those of other masters exhibited in the Louvre. He also painted landscapes of northern France, the Netherlands and Italy, and genre paintings including Joueurs de dames. Other important works are Rachel déclamant la tragédie de Phèdre, devant Alfred de Musset and L'Heure du lait en Haute Alsace. He also painted animals (Chevaux à l'abri) and portraits (Gaston Roullet).

For a period of 32 years, Scherrer exhibited his works in Paris, Barcelona, Chicago and Tunis. Today they can be seen in France, Canada and the United States. Following his death in Paris in May 1916, there was an exhibition of his work in 1920. In 2006, a large exhibition of his work was held in his native Lutterbach.

== Reception ==
Although Scherrer is not well known today, eclipsed as he is by contemporary impressionists, he was well received in the early 20th century. A commentator for the Journal d'Alsace wrote: "Scherrer's is characterized by constant attention to form and composition. A powerful colourist, with the gift of a fruitful imagination, our famous countryman is one of the most highly esteemed artists of our times."

== Family ==
In 1880, Scherrer married Mathilde Haquette, a porcelain decorator at the Sèvres factory. They had two children: Jean who died at sea when he was 18, and Lucie-Marthe (1884–1979) who was very close to her father.
