= The Destiny of Nations =

Poem written by Samuel Taylor Coleridge

The Destiny of Nations was composed by Samuel Taylor Coleridge as part of Robert Southey's Joan of Arc epic poem. The lines were later isolated from Southey's and expanded. The new poem includes Coleridge's feelings on politics, religion, and humanity's duty to helping each other.

== Background ==
The idea for Destiny of the Nations originates during mid-1795 while Coleridge gave lectures and was working with Southey on Joan of Arc. While working on the epic, he set many of the lines he wrote aside for his own poem. Charles Lamb's response to Coleridge's reuse of the lines was to say in a letter on 5 February 1797:

You cannot surely mean to degrade the Joan of Arc into a pot girl. You are not going, I hope, to annex to that most splendid ornament of Southey's poem all this cock and a bull story of Joan the publican's daughter of Neufchatel, with the lamentable episode of a waggoner, his wife, and six children; the texture will be most lamentably disproportionate. The first forty or fifty lines of these addenda are, no doubt, in their way, admirable, too; but many would prefer the Joan of Southey.

At the beginning of 1797, Coleridge attempted to complete the poem for a 1797 edition of his poems. However, he was unable to finish and was discouraged by Lamb's words. He soon replaced the poem with Ode to the Departing Year in the collection. The Destiny of Nations was expanded and those lines were published in the 26 December 1797 Morning Post as The Visions of the Maid of Orleans: A Fragment. Coleridge continued trying to finish the poem in 1798, but he abandoned it at the end of 1799 until taking it back up again in mid-1814. The poem was not published in full until 1817.

== Poem ==
The final version of the poem contains 272 lines, the last being incomplete, of which lines 1–120 correspond to lines 1–119 of Joan of Arc Book II. These lines are followed by those published in the Morning Post, which make up lines 121–271a. The poem is concluded with a series of fragments from Joan of Arc Book II that make up the rest of what he wrote for the epic.

The poem begins with the narrator's searching for the divine through use of his senses:

For all that meets the bodily sense I deem
Symbolical, one mighty alphabet
For infant minds; and we in this low world
Placed with our backs to bright Reality,
That we may learn with young unwounded ken
The substance from its shadow.

— lines 18-23

Then, the poem introduces the figure of the Greenland Wizard:

Or if the Greenland Wizard in strange trance
Pierces the untravelled realms of Ocean's bed
Over the abysm, even to that uttermost cave
By mis-shaped prodigies beleaguered, such
As Earth ne'er bred, nor Air, nor the upper Sea:
Where dwells the Fury Form, whose unheard name
With eager eye, pale cheek, suspended breath,
And lips half-opening with the dread of sound,
Unsleeping Silence guards, worn out with fear
Lest haply 'scaping on some treacherous blast
The fateful word let slip the Elements
And frenzy Nature.

— lines 98–109

The actual "maid of Orleans" is described in terms of her knowledge of humanity, her background, and her relationship with nature in the next section:

From her infant days,
With Wisdom, mother of retired thoughts,
Her soul had dwelt; and she was quick to mark
The good and evil thing, in human lore
Undisciplined. For lowly was her birth,
And Heaven had doomed her early years to toil
That pure from Tyranny's least deed, herself
Unfeared by Fellow-natures, she might wait
On the poor labouring man with kindly looks,
And minister refreshment to the tired
Way-wanderer, when along the rough-hewn bench
The sweltry man had stretched him, and aloft
Vacantly watched the rudely-pictured board
Which on the Mulberry-bough with welcome creak
Swung to the pleasant breeze. Here, too, the Maid
Learnt more than Schools could teach: Man's shifting mind,
His vices and his sorrows! And full oft
At tales of cruel wrong and strange distress
Had wept and shivered.

— lines 139–157

The poem continues by explaining how she works to help humanity and society. Afterward, the narrator describes her condition within an imperfect world, how she is one of God's elect, and her destiny to lead people towards a better world:

Ah! suffering to the height of what was suffered,
Stung with too keen a sympathy, the Maid
Brooded with moving lips, mute, startful, dark!
And now her flushed tumultuous features shot
Such strange vivacity, as fires the eye
Of Misery fancy-crazed! and now once more
Naked, and void, and fixed, and all within
The unquiet silence of confuséd thought
And shapeless feelings. For a mighty hand
Was strong upon her, till in the heat of soul
To the high hill-top tracing back her steps,
Aside the beacon, up whose smouldered stones
The tender ivy-trails crept thinly, there,
Unconscious of the driving element,
Yea, swallowed up in the ominous dream, she sate
Ghastly as broad-eyed Slumber! a dim anguish
Breathed from her look! and still with pant and sob,
Inly she toiled to flee, and still subdued,
Felt an inevitable Presence near.

Thus as she toiled in troublous ecstasy,
A horror of great darkness wrapt her round,
And a voice uttered forth unearthly tones,
Calming her soul,— "O Thou of the Most High
Chosen, whom all the perfected in Heaven
Behold expectant—"

— lines 253–277

== Themes ==
The topic of the poem deals with the "maid of Orleans", or Joan of Arc, and how she was able to conquer her enemies. The maid is educated by nature and is said to know more about society and humanity than the educated. Her destiny is to fix society and to lead humanity to a better life. However, she is a character that is also separated from humanity in a way similar to the characters found within many Romantic poems. Philosophically, the poem is rooted in the works of Plato and Plotinus along with St. Paul. There is a connection within the poem to the ideas of Berkley, and the original lines of the poem were influenced by the philosophy of Godwin, Hartley, and Priestley. Coleridge, at the end of his life, wrote: "Within 12 months after the writing of this poem my bold Optimism, and Necessitarianism, together with the Infra, sue plusquam-Socinianism, down to which, step by step, I had unbelieved, gave way to the day-break of a more genial and less shallow System. But I contemplate with pleasure these Phases of my Transition."

One aspect of the poem is the search for the divine within nature. The poet's role is to use what is inside of him to add symbolic meaning to the world. Nature, in such a situation, serves as a sort of text from which to gain knowledge. This idea would be later expanded in his Opus Maximum project and was contained in other poems including "The Eolian Harp". Other connections to his works include the Greenland Wizard, which serves as a legendary precursor to Coleridge's mythical Rime of the Ancient Mariner.

== Sources ==
The poem provides insight into what works Coleridge was relying on and would rely on again when he wrote The Rime of the Ancient Mariner. He makes these works clear in his footnotes, such as one from Crantz's History of Greenland Vol. I. Other footnotes refer to Lemius's De Lapponibus and the Book of Revelation. Other sources are the works of Godwin, Hartley, and Priestley along with Erasmus Darwin's Botanic Garden. More general influences on individual lines include Richard Glover's Leonidas (1737), James Thomsons's Winter, and Bryan Edwards History, Civil and Commercial, of the British Colonies in the West Indies (1793–1794).

== Critical response ==
Virginia Radley claims that the poem "contain faults similar to those manifest in the Chatterton monodies: an abundance of personification, forced diction, contrived rhymes, sentimentality, and lack of unity. within the greater context of the Romantic point of view, however, Coleridge's 'Maid' is important. Isolation, loneliness, a feeling of alienation—all characterize the Harolds, Manfreds, Lucys, Michaels, and Mariners of a later-day Romanticism." Rosemary Ashton believes that "The chief, perhaps only, interest of the poem, or rather set of fragments strung together, is that it display Coleridge's reading at this time of books which yielded much finer fruits in The Ancient Mariner, begun later in the same year."

Coleridge's close friend Charles Lamb with whom he regularly discussed artistic matter in person and in writing, advised Coleridge against pursuing the poem: '“I will enumerate some woeful blemishes, some of ‘em sad deviations from that simplicity which was your aim…”

== Bibliography ==
- Ashton, Rosemary. The Life of Samuel Taylor Coleridge. Oxford: Blackwell, 1997.
- Coleridge, Samuel Taylor (1921). Coleridge, Ernest Hartley (ed.). The Poems of Samuel Taylor Coleridge. Oxford University Press.
- Colmer, John. Coleridge: Critic of Society. Oxford: Clarendon Press, 1959.
- Holmes, Richard. Coleridge: Early Visions, 1772–1804. New York: Pantheon, 1989.
- Jasper, David. Coleridge as Poet & Religious Thinker. Allison Park: Pickwick, 1985.
- Lamb, Charles. The Works of Charles and Mary Lamb. London: Methuen, 1905.
- Mays, J. C. C. (editor). The Collected Works of Samuel Taylor Coleridge: Poetical Works I Vol I.I. Princeton: Princeton University Press, 2001.
- Radley, Virginia. Samuel Taylor Coleridge. New York: Twayne Publishers, 1966.
- Rzepka, Charles. The Self as Mind. Cambridge, Mass.: Harvard University Press, 1986.
