= Philippe-Alexandre Le Brun de Charmettes =

- Born: 7 April 1785
- Died: 13 May 1880; Chartres
- Occupations: Historian, property manager, writer
- Awards: Chevalier of the Legion of Honour (1822)

Philippe-Alexandre Le Brun de Charmettes (1785–1880) was a French historian, poet, translator and official.

De Charmettes was born in Bordeaux (France).

He was appointed to the French Conseil d'État in 1810 and became a préfet (prefect) in the French department of Haute-Saône in 1830.

A contributor to the literary magazine l’Abeille littéraire, created by Victor Hugo in 1821, he is mainly known for his successful efforts to rescue the figure of Jeanne d'Arc from partial oblivion and turn her into a national heroine.

His interest for Joan came at a time when France was still struggling to define its new identity after the French Revolution and the Napoleonic Wars. The national ethos was in search of non controversial heroes. A staunch prop to King and country, Joan of Arc was an acceptable symbol to the monarchists. As a patriot and the daughter of commoners, she was seen as one prototype of the low-born volunteers (the soldats de l'an II) who had victoriously fought for revolutionary France in 1792 and as such could be claimed by the Republicans. As a religious martyr, she was also popular in the powerful Catholic community. De Charmette's Orleanide, today largely forgotten, was another attempt to magnify the national ethos as writers like Virgil (the Aeneid), or Camoens (the Lusiad) had done for Rome and Portugal.

== Significant works ==
- Histoire de Jeanne d'Arc (Histoire de Jeanne d'arc-Tome1 Tome2 Tome3 Tome4), Paris, Ed. Artus Bertrand, 1817, 4 volumes. (The story of Joan of Arc, known as the Maid of Orleans, based on her own statements, 144 depositions from eye-witnesses, and manuscripts in the Royal Library in the Tower of London.)
- L'Orléanide, Poème national en vingt-huit chants (The Orleanid, a national epic in 28 cantos), Paris, Ed. Artus Bertrand, 1821.
- Épitres politiques sur nos Extravagances , Paris, Ed. P. Dentu, 1831.
- 1804:Translation in French – Le château de Néville (Novel)
- 1814:Translation in French – O'Donnel – MORGAN, Lady (Novel)
- 1817:Translation in French – La France (Ré-édition augmentée) – MORGAN, Lady (Novel)

== Further links ==
- About his involvement in literature (Hugo, Jussieu).
- Information about the History of Joan of Arc in the Bibliothèque Nationale de France for 1818
  - Journal général de la littérature de France ou Répertoire méthodique 1818
  - ÉPITRES (Bibliothèque nationale de France)
- For a 19th-century representation of Joan of Arc in the archives of Columbia University: (Engraving, Columbia University)
