= Dry stone =

Construction method

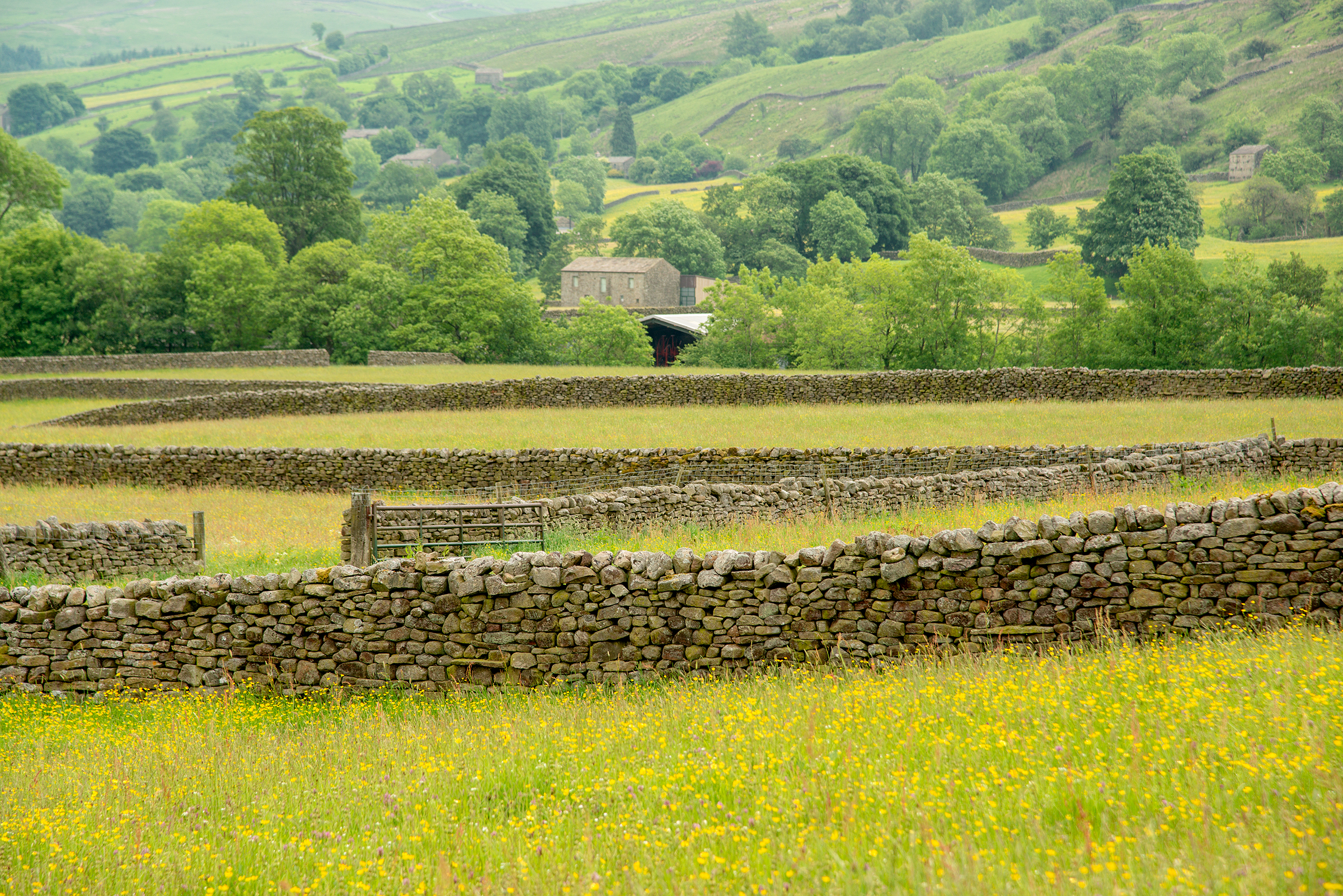
Dry stone walls in the Yorkshire Dales, England

Dry stone, dry laid in the US, or drystack or, in Scotland and Northern England, drystane, is a method of building structures from stones without any mortar to bind them together. A certain amount of binding is obtained through the use of carefully selected interlocking stones.

Dry stone construction is best known in the context of stone walls, traditionally used for the boundaries of fields and churchyards, or as retaining walls for terracing, but dry stone shelters, houses and other structures also exist. The term tends not to be used for the many historic styles which used precisely-shaped stone, but did not use mortar, for example the Greek temple and Inca architecture.

The art of dry stone walling was inscribed in 2018 on the UNESCO representative List of the Intangible Cultural Heritage of Humanity, for dry stone walls in countries such as France, Greece, Italy, Slovenia, Croatia, Switzerland and Spain. In 2024, Ireland was added to the list.

== History ==
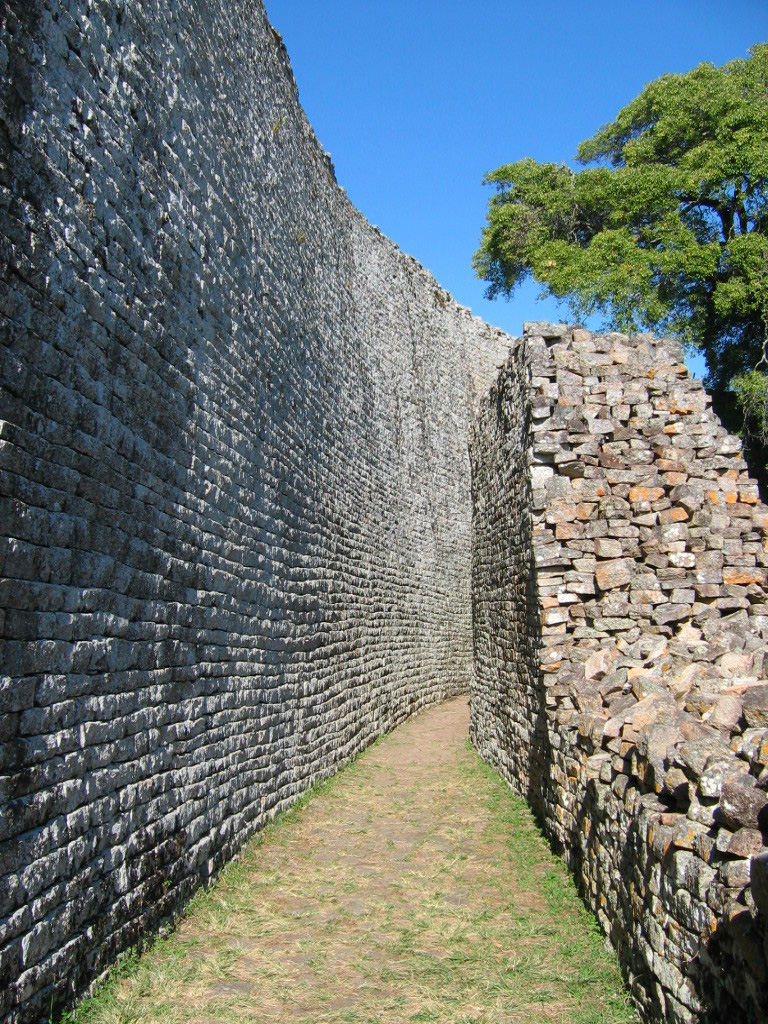
Partially damaged passageway in the Great Enclosure of Great Zimbabwe

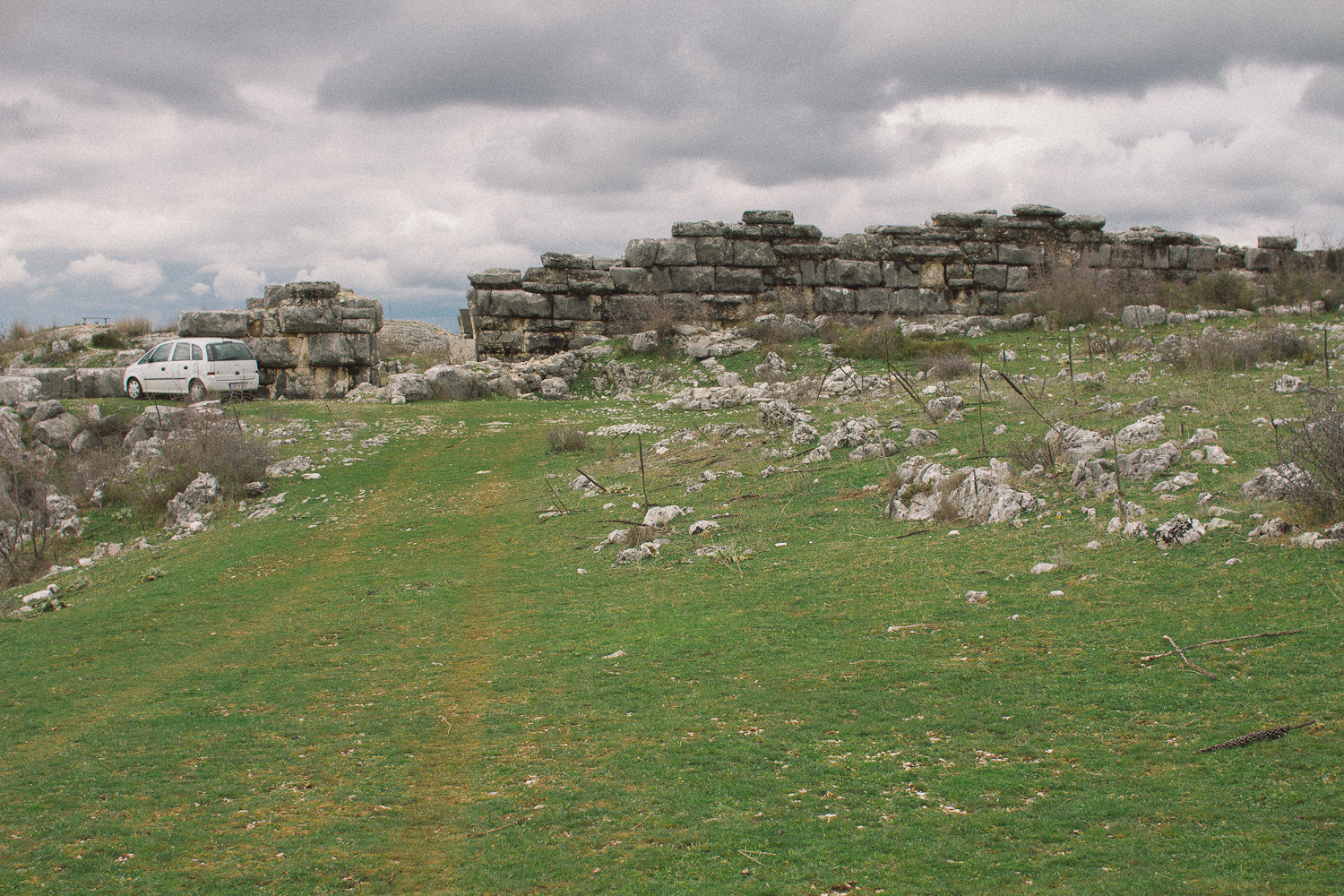
Daorson in Bosnia and Herzegovina

Some dry stone wall constructions in northwest Europe have been dated back to the Neolithic Age. In County Mayo, Ireland, an entire field system made from dry stone walls, since covered in peat, has been carbon-dated to 3800 BC. These are near contemporary with the dry stone constructed Neolithic village of Skara Brae and the chambered cairns of Scotland.

In Belize, the Mayan ruins at Lubaantun illustrate use of dry stone construction in architecture of the 8th and 9th centuries AD.

Great Zimbabwe in modern Zimbabwe is a large city complex constructed in dry stone from the 11th to the 15th centuries AD. It is the largest of the structures of similar construction throughout the area.

== Location and terminology ==
=== Europe ===
Terminology varies regionally. When used as field boundaries, dry stone structures are more commonly known as dykes in Scotland, where professional dry stone wall builders are referred to as 'dykers'. Dry stone walls are characteristic of upland areas of Britain and Ireland where rock forms natural outcrops or large stones exist in quantity in the soil. They are especially abundant in the West of Ireland, particularly Connemara. They may also be found throughout the Mediterranean, including retaining walls used for terracing. Such constructions are common where large stones are plentiful (for example, in The Burren) or conditions are too harsh for hedges capable of retaining livestock to be grown as reliable field boundaries. Many thousands of kilometres of such walls exist, most of them centuries old. Dry stone walls are found in the Swiss–Italian border region, where they are often used to enclose the open space under large natural boulders or outcrops.

The higher-lying rock-rich fields and pastures in Bohemia's southwestern border range of Šumava (e.g. around the mountain river of Vydra) are often lined by dry stone walls built of field-stones removed from the arable or cultural land. They serve both as cattle/sheep fences and the lot's borders. Sometimes also the dry stone terracing is apparent, often combined with parts of stone masonry (house foundations and shed walls) that are held together by a clay and pine needle "composite" mortar.

The dry stone walling tradition of Croatia was added to the UNESCO Representative List of the Intangible Cultural Heritage of Humanity in November 2018, alongside those of Cyprus, France, Greece, Italy, Slovenia, Spain and Switzerland. In Croatia, dry stone walls (suhozidi) were built for a variety of reasons: to clear the earth of stone for crops; to delineate land ownership; or for shelter against the bora wind. Some walls date back to the Liburnian era. Notable examples include the island of Baljenac, which has 23 kilometres (14 mi) of dry stone walls despite being only 14 hectares (35 acres) in area, and the vineyards of Primošten.

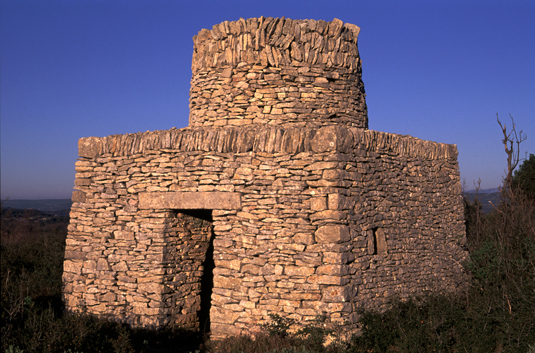
"Cabane de Malais" at Souvignargues, Gard, France

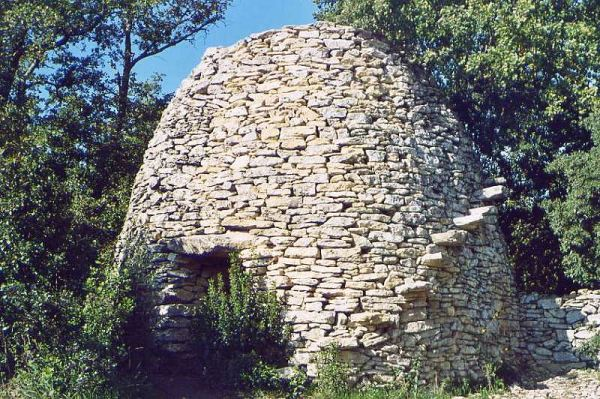
Dry stone hut at Vers-Pont-du-Gard, Gard, France

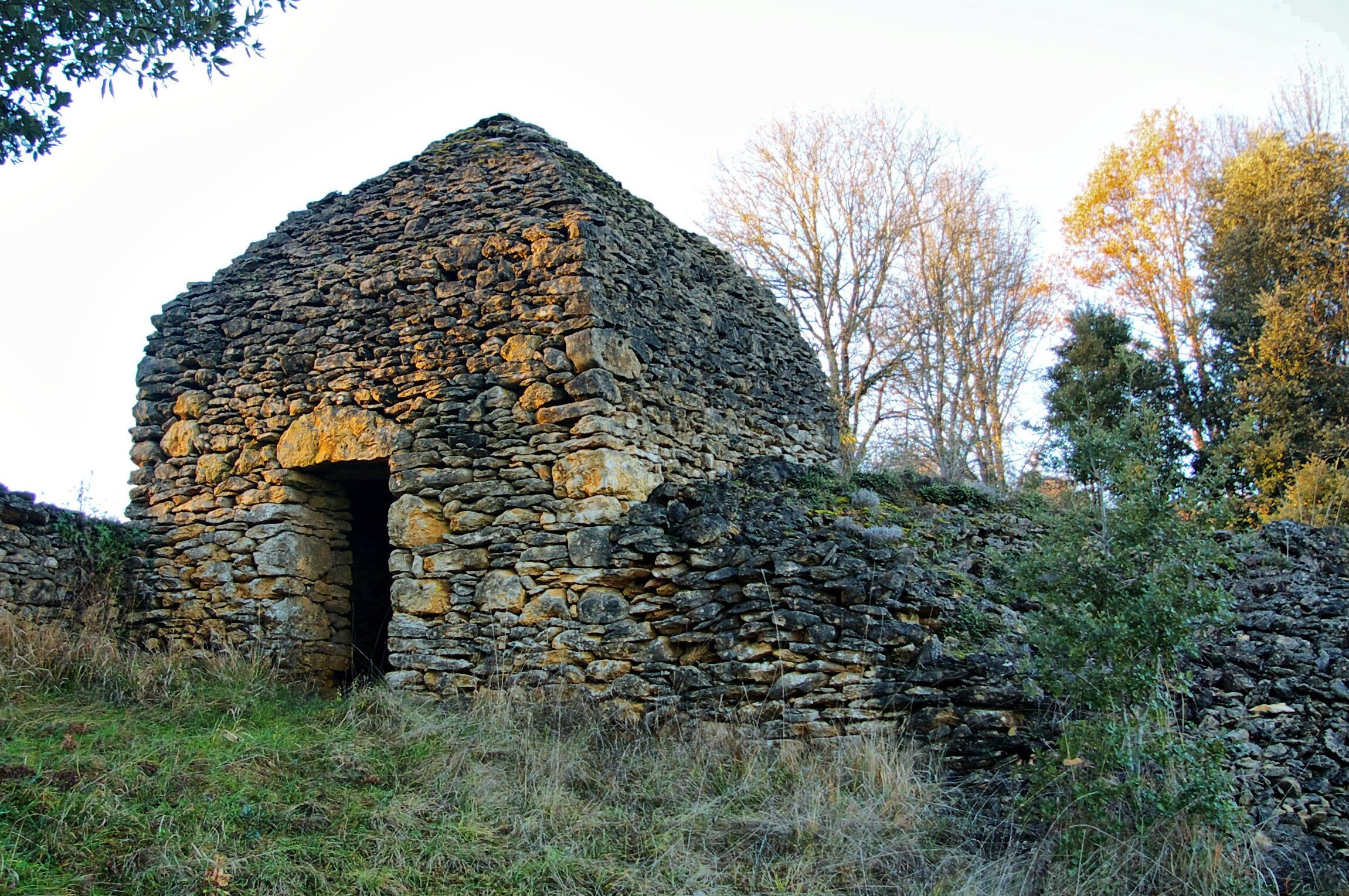
Dry stone hut at Vitrac, Dordogne, France

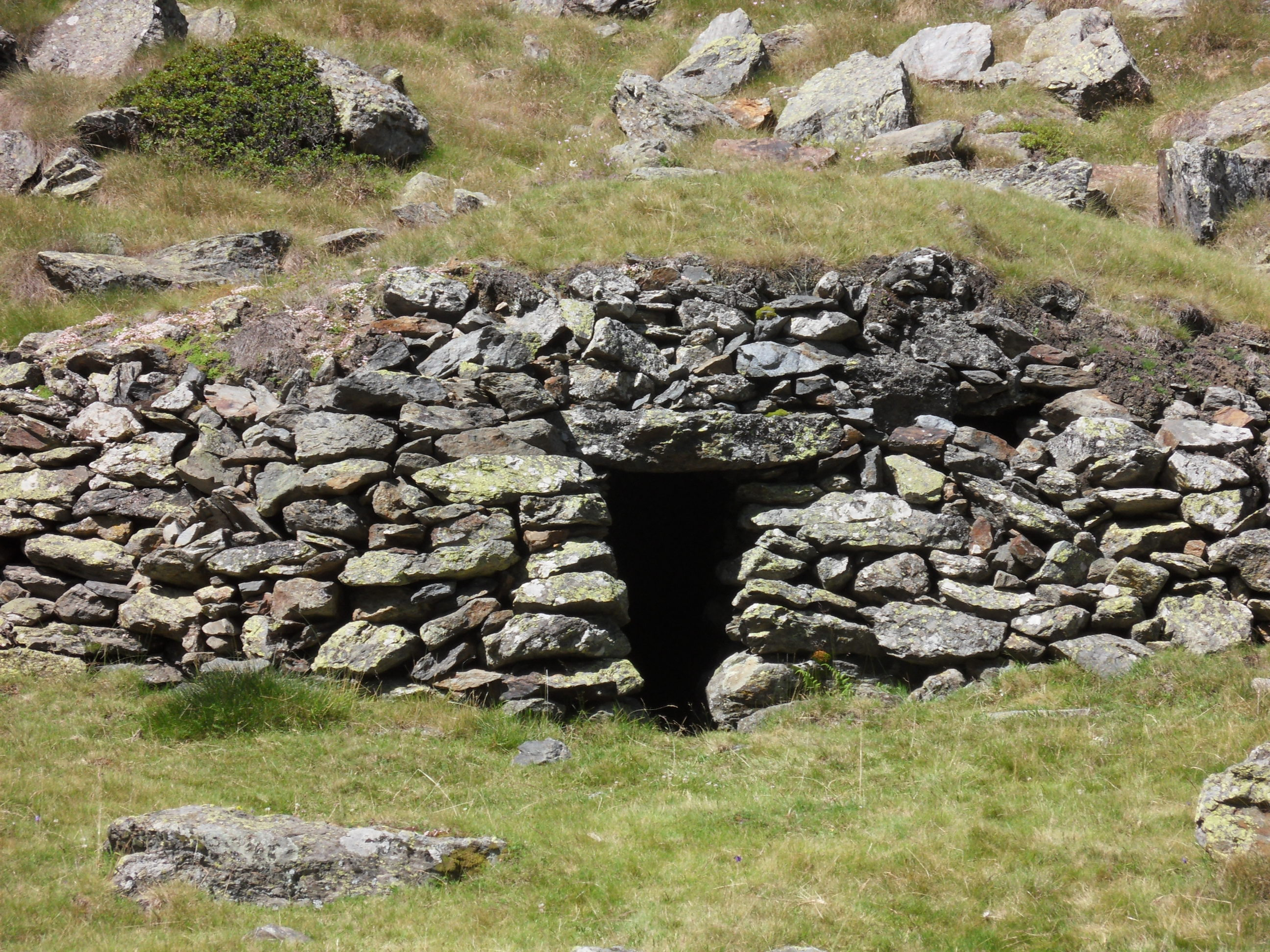
Summer hut in the Vicdessos area, Ariège, French Pyrenees

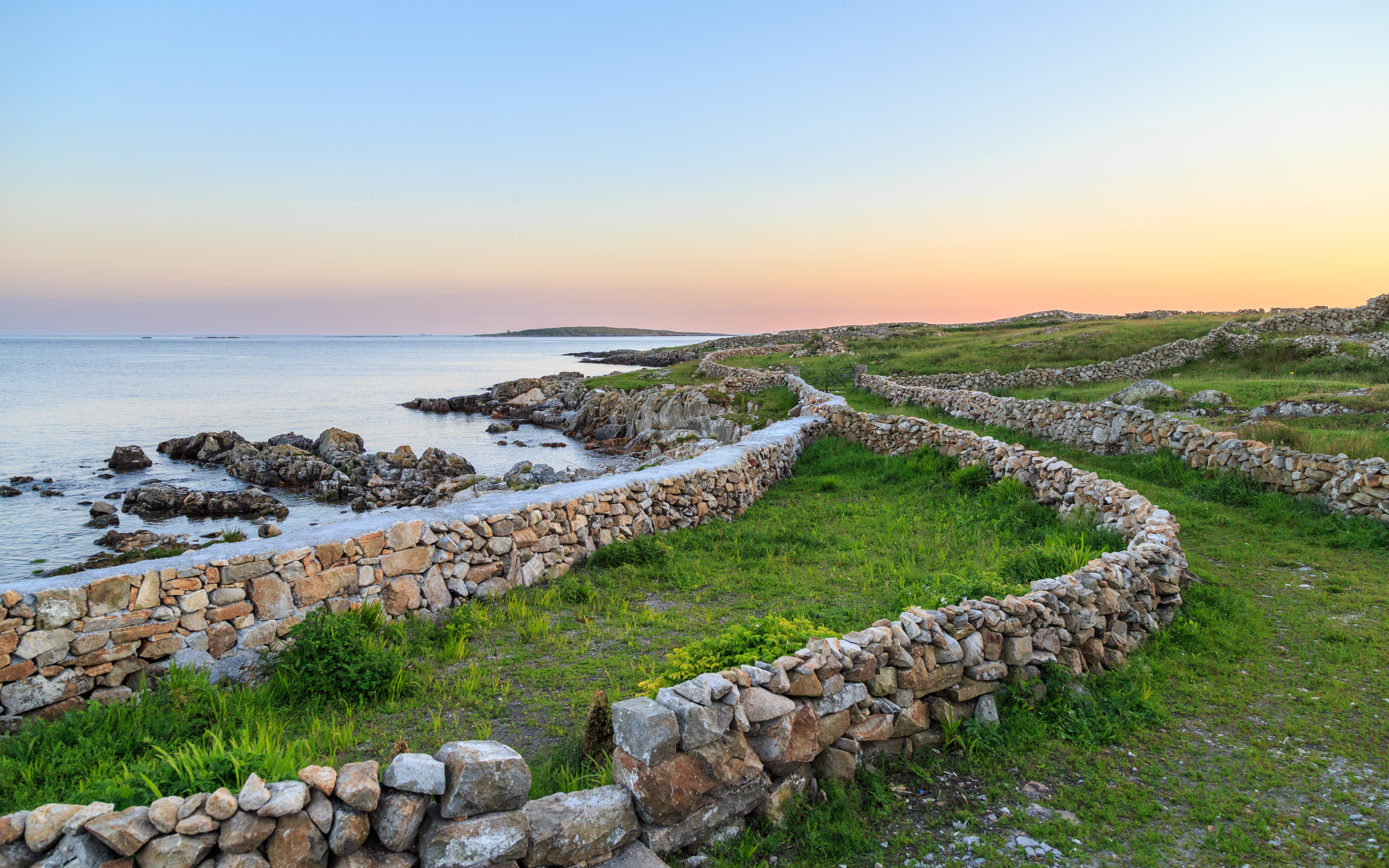
Dry stone walls at the Connemara coast near Carna

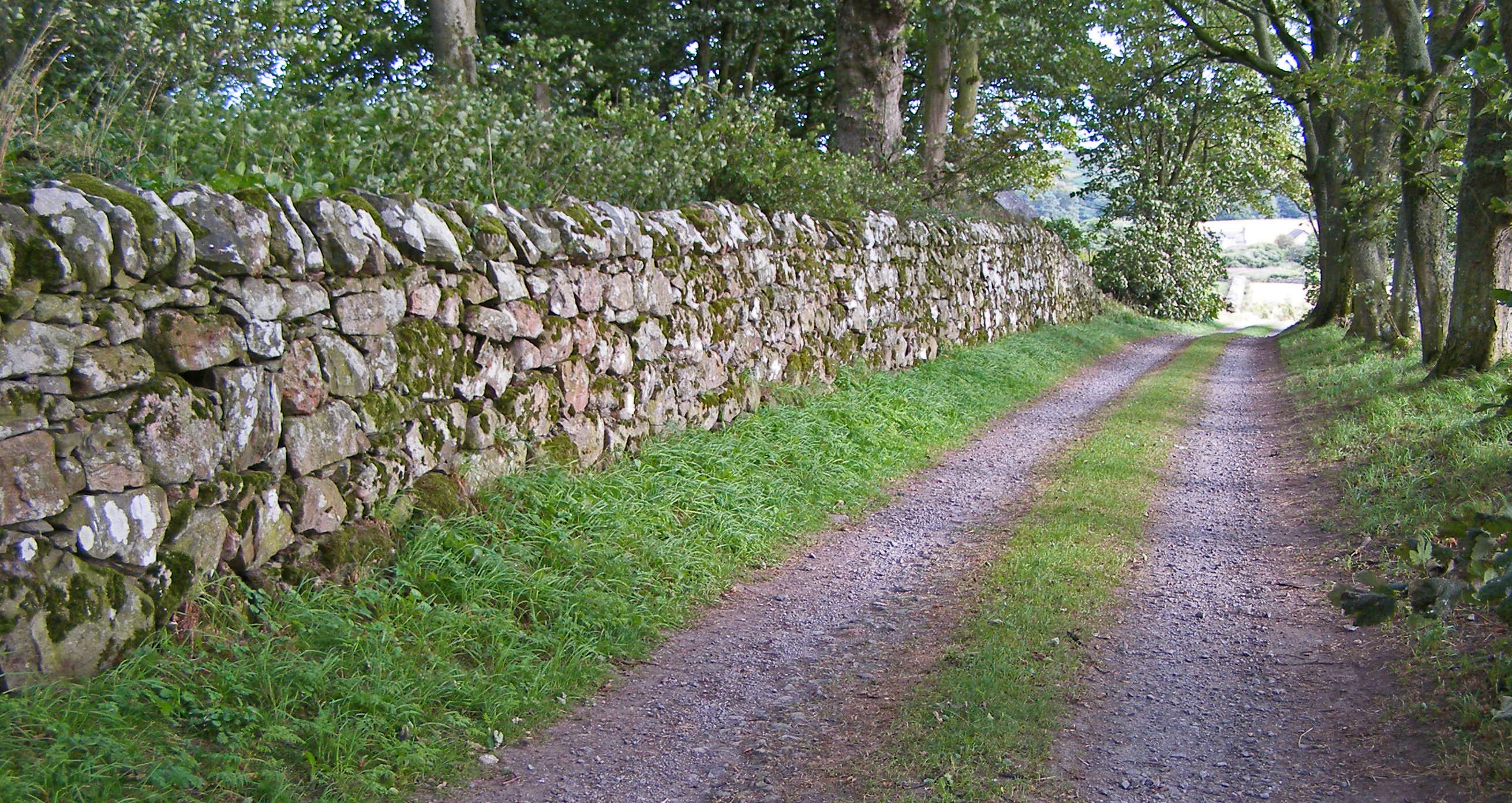
Dry stone fence, or drystane dyke, at Muchalls Castle, Scotland

=== North America ===
In the United States, dry stone structures are common in areas with rocky soils, such as New England, New York, New Jersey, and Pennsylvania. They are a notable characteristic of the bluegrass region of central Kentucky, the Ozarks of Arkansas and Missouri, as well as Virginia, where they are usually referred to as rock fences or stone fences, and the Napa Valley in north central California. The technique of construction was brought to America primarily by English and Scots-Irish immigrants.

=== Oceania ===
Through immigration from European nations, the technique was transported to Australia (principally western Victoria, some parts of Tasmania, and some parts of New South Wales, particularly around Kiama) and New Zealand (especially Otago).

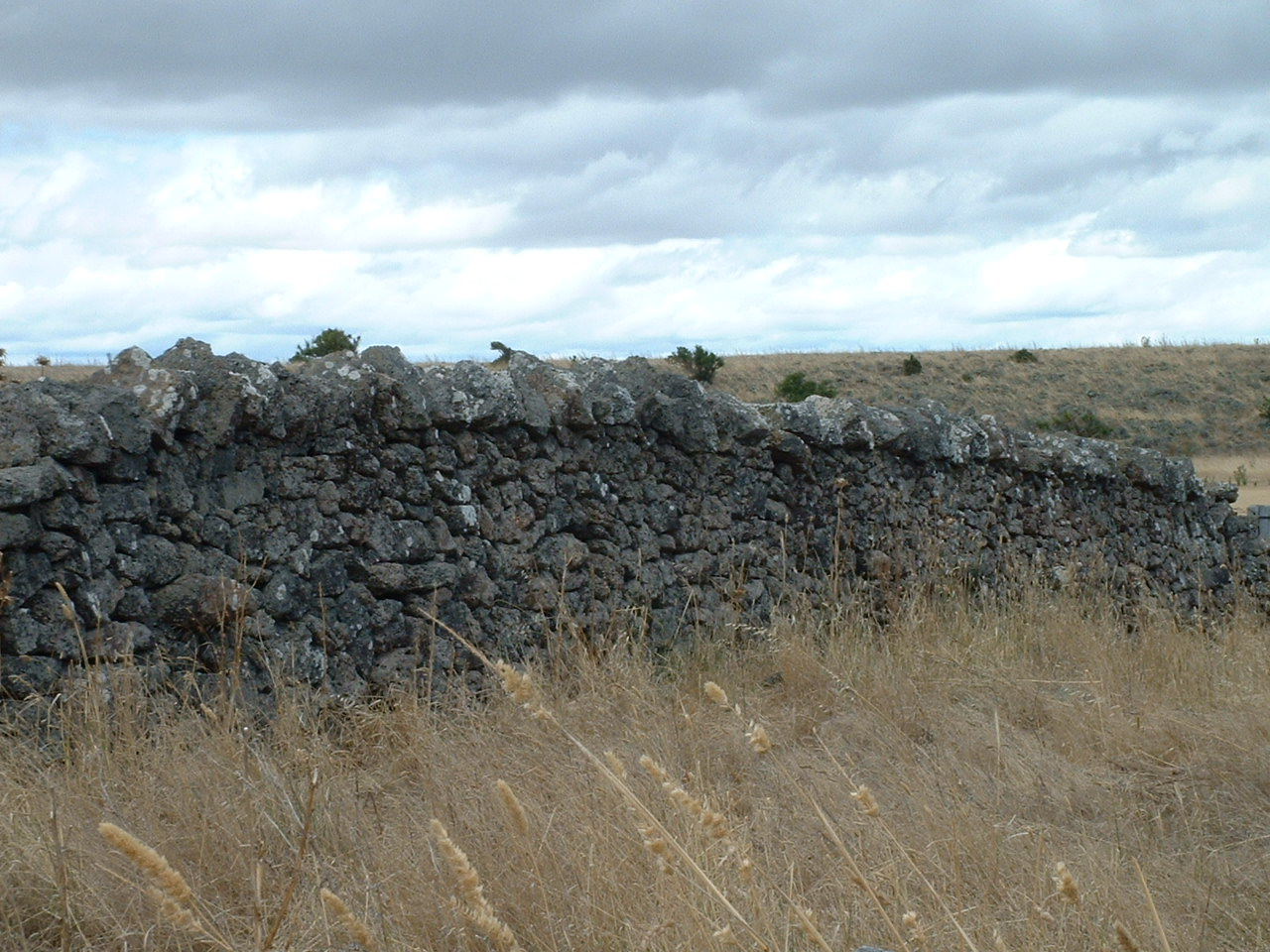
Dry stone wall in Corangamite

=== South America ===
In the Andes in the 15th century AD, the Inca constructed dry stone terraces (andenes) to maximize agricultural production in the mountainous terrain. They also employed this mode of construction for freestanding walls. The ashlar type construction in Machu Picchu uses the classic Inca architectural style, in which blocks of stone are cut to fit together tightly without mortar. Many junctions are so perfect that not even a knife fits between the stones. The structures have persisted in the earthquake-prone region because of the flexibility of the walls, and because in their double wall architecture, the two portions of the walls incline into each other.

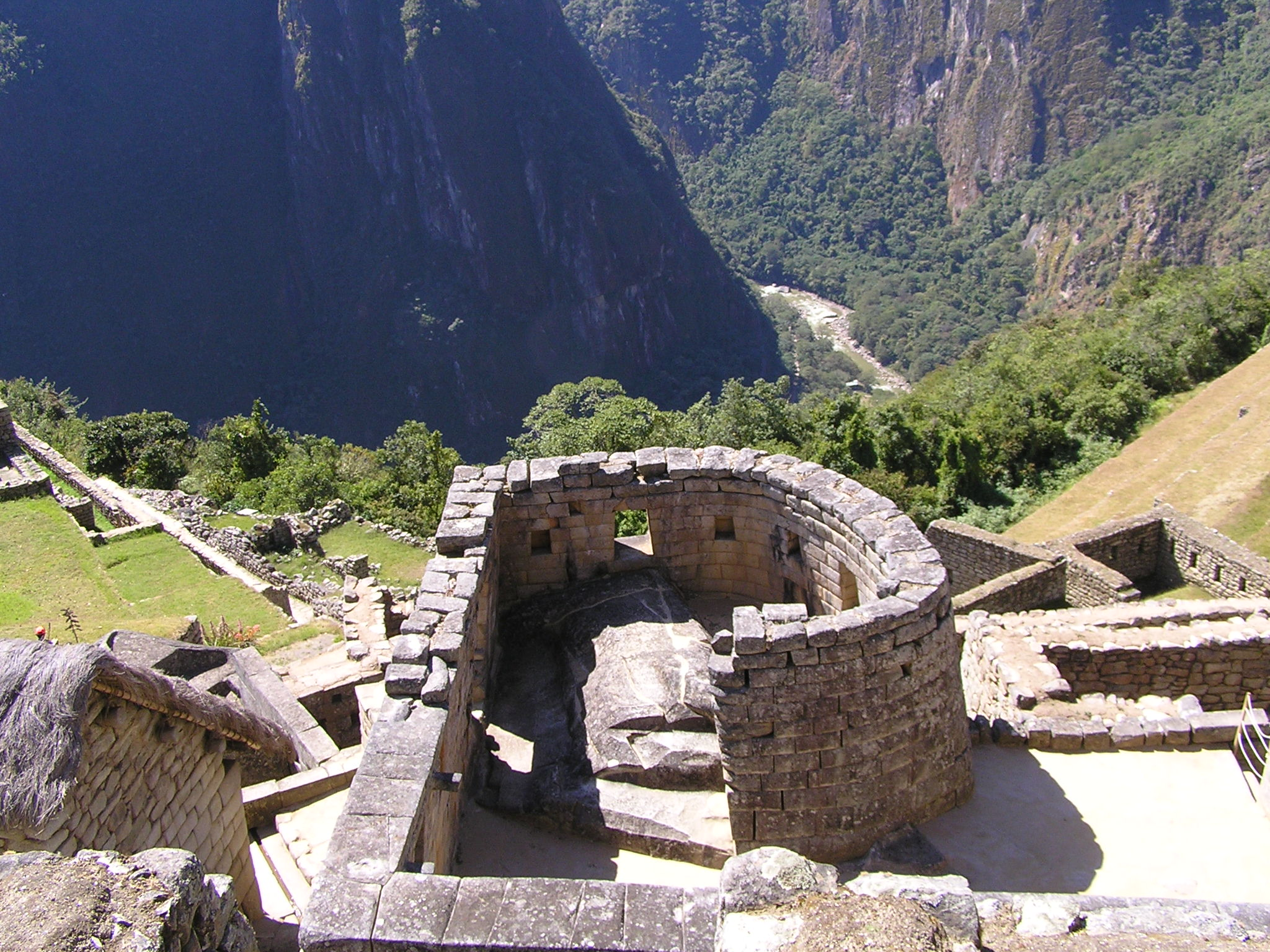
Intihuatana ritual buildings of dry stone at Machu Picchu, Peru

== Construction ==
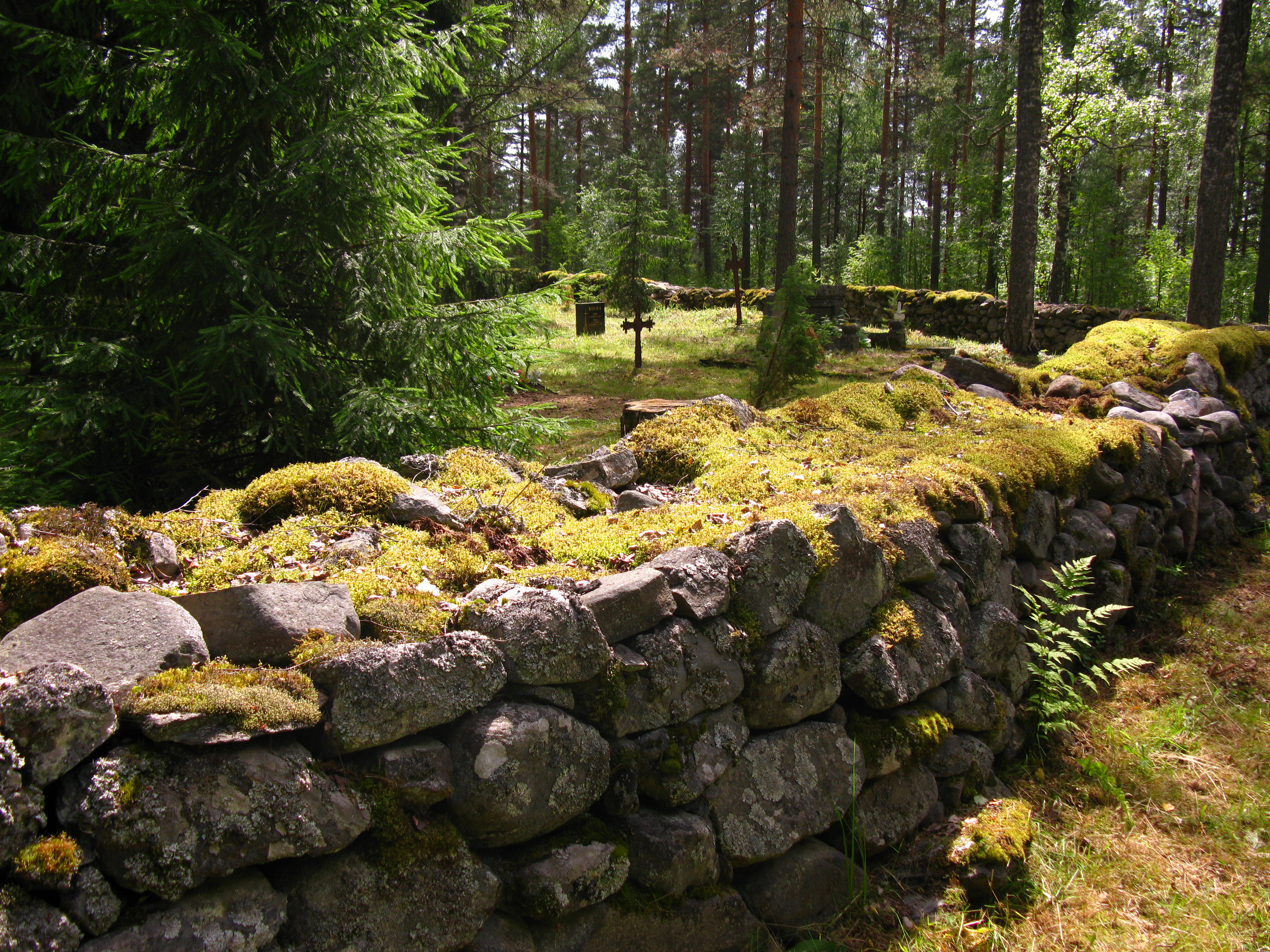
A partly moss-covered dry stone fence of the old Vierevi Cemetery in Parikkala, Finland

The style and method of construction of a wall will vary depending on the type of stone available, its intended use and local tradition. Many older walls were constructed from stones and boulders cleared from fields during preparation for agriculture (field stones) although some used stone quarried nearby. For modern walls, quarried stone is almost always used.

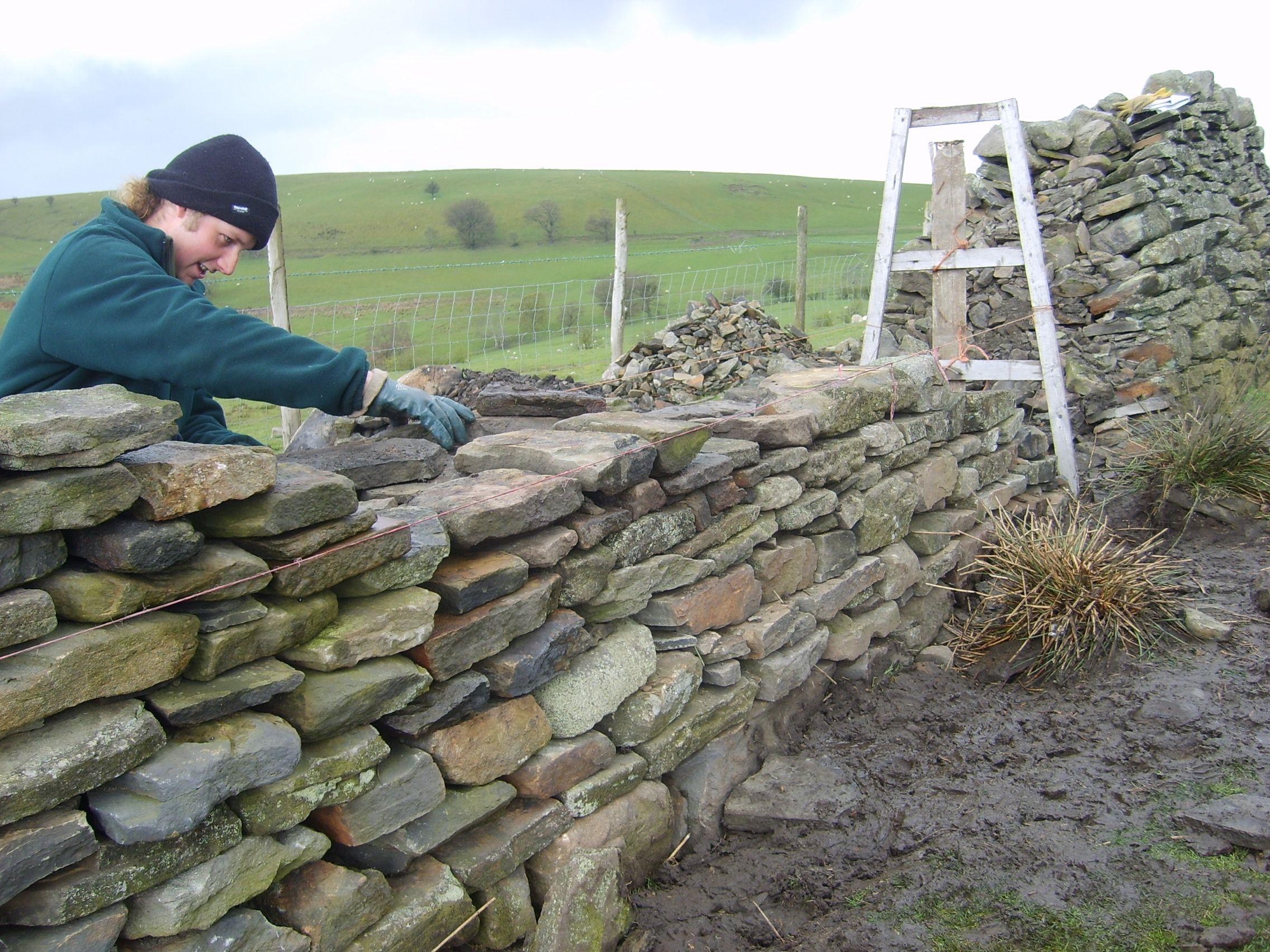
Using a batter-frame and guidelines to rebuild a dry stone wall in South Wales, UK

One type of wall is called a "double" wall and is constructed by placing two vertical layers of stones along the boundary to be walled. The foundation stones are ideally set into the ground so as to rest firmly on the subsoil. The rows are initially composed of large flattish stones, diminishing in size as the wall rises. Diminishing the width of the wall as it gets higher, as traditionally done in Britain, strengthens the wall considerably. Smaller stones may be used as chocks in areas where the natural stone shape is more rounded. The walls are built up to the desired height layer-by-layer (course by course), and large tie-stones or through stones, which span both faces of the wall and sometimes protrude, are placed at intervals. The tie-stones bond what would otherwise be two thin walls leaning against each other, greatly increasing the strength of the wall. The voids between the facing stones are carefully packed with smaller stones (filling, hearting).

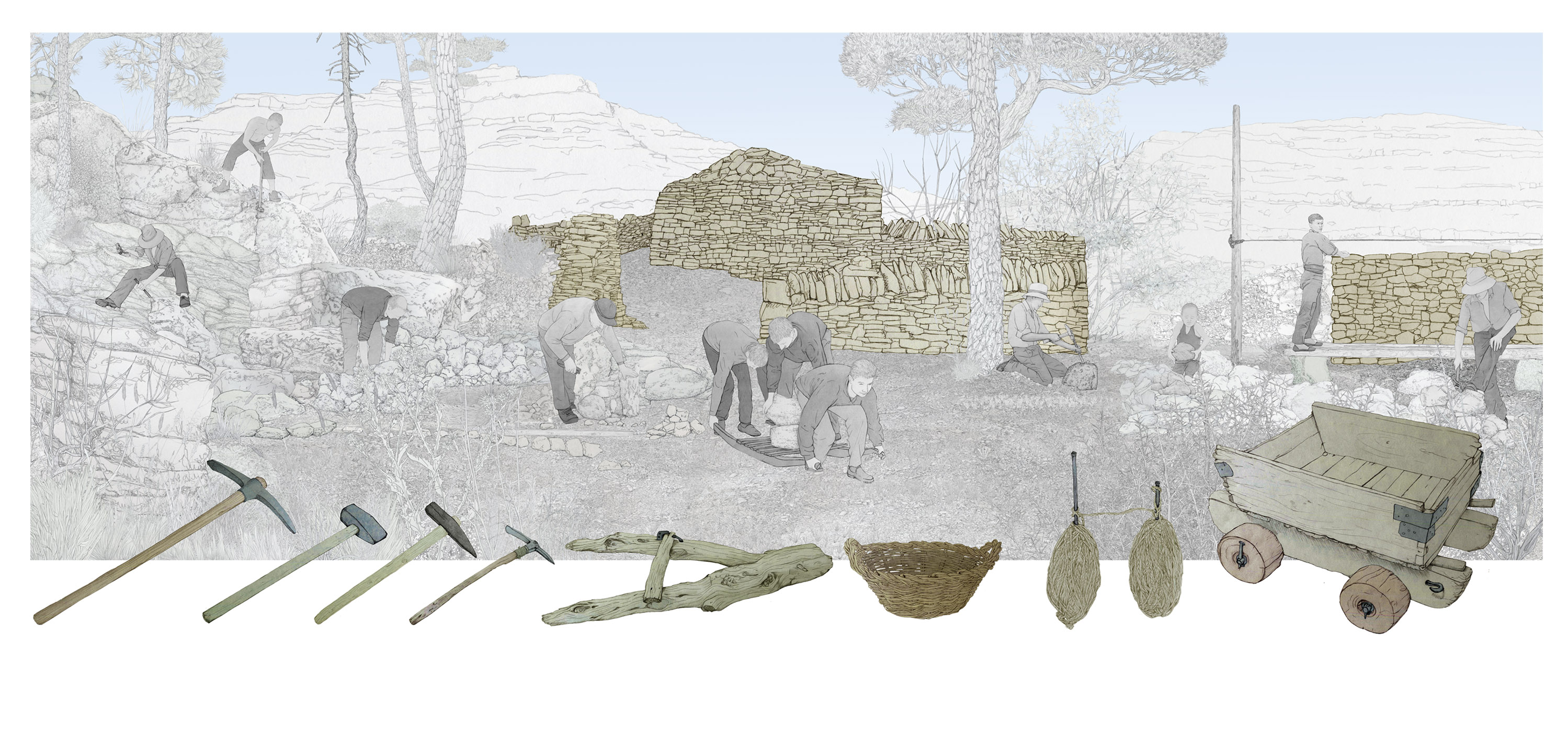
Construction work on dry stone. Illustration of the Valencian Museum of Ethnology.

The topmost layer of the wall consists of large stones, called capstones, coping stones or copes. Like tie stones, the capstones span the entire width of the wall and prevent it breaking apart. In some areas, such as South Wales, there is a tradition of placing the coping stones on a final layer of flat stones slightly wider than the top of the wall proper (coverbands).

In addition to gates, a wall may be built with gaps for the passage or control of wildlife and livestock such as sheep. The smaller holes, usually no more than 200 millimetres (8 in) in height, are called "Bolt Holes" or "Smoots". Larger ones may be between 450 and 600 mm (18 and 24 in) in height, which are called "Cripple Holes".

Boulder walls are a type of single wall consisting primarily of large boulders, around which smaller stones are placed. Single walls work best with large, flatter stones. Ideally, the largest stones are placed at the bottom and the whole wall tapers toward the top. Sometimes a row of capstones completes the top of a wall, with the long rectangular side of each capstone perpendicular to the wall alignment.

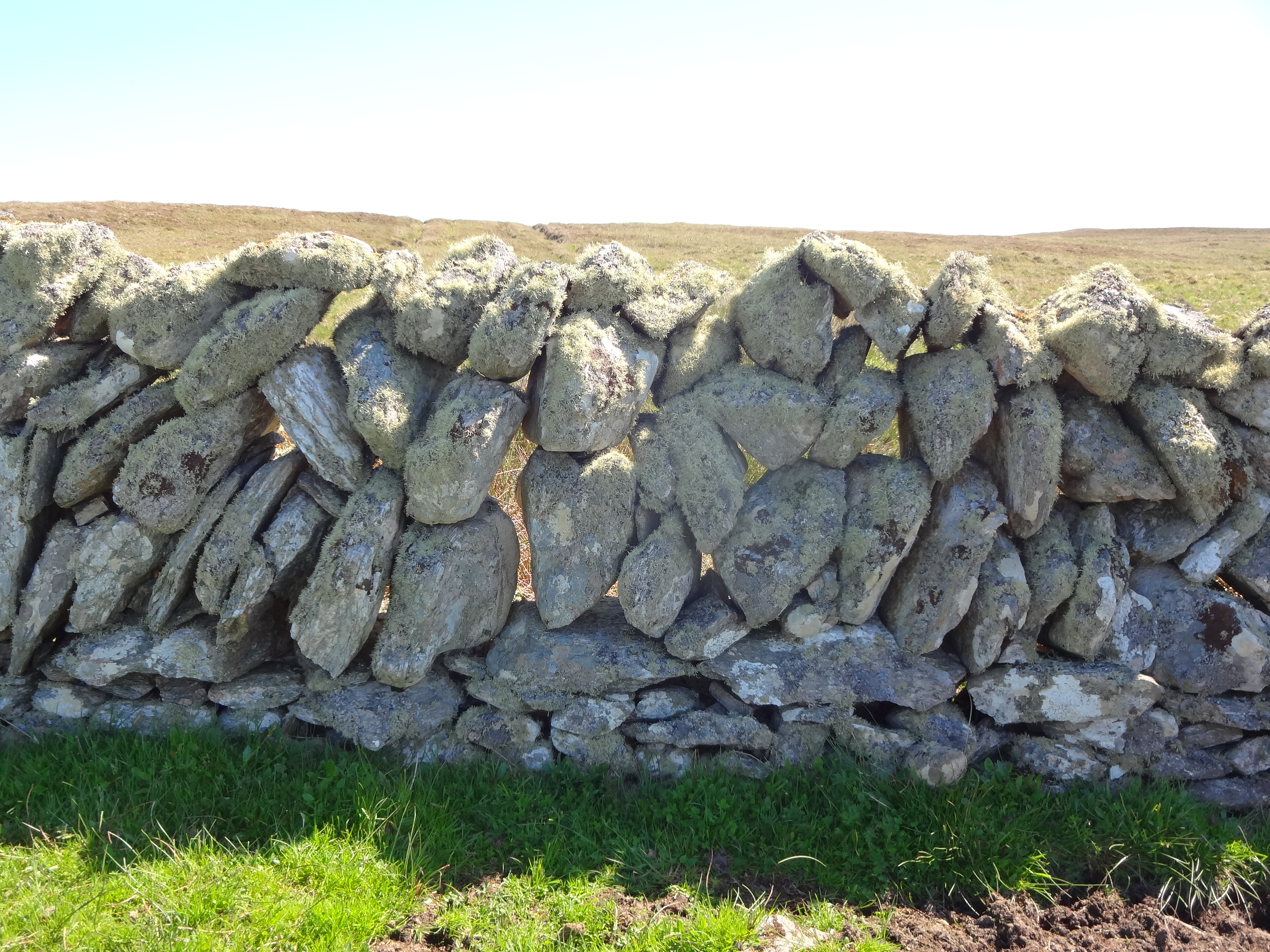
Galloway dyke on Fetlar, Shetland Islands, UK

Galloway dykes consist of a base of double-wall construction or larger boulders, with single-wall construction above. They appear to be rickety, with many holes, which deters livestock (and people) from attempting to cross them. These dykes are principally found in locations with exceptionally high winds, where a solid wall might be unsettled by buffeting. The porous nature of the wall significantly reduces wind force but takes greater skill to construct. They are also found in grazing areas to maximize the utility of the available stones (where ploughing was not turning up ever more stones).

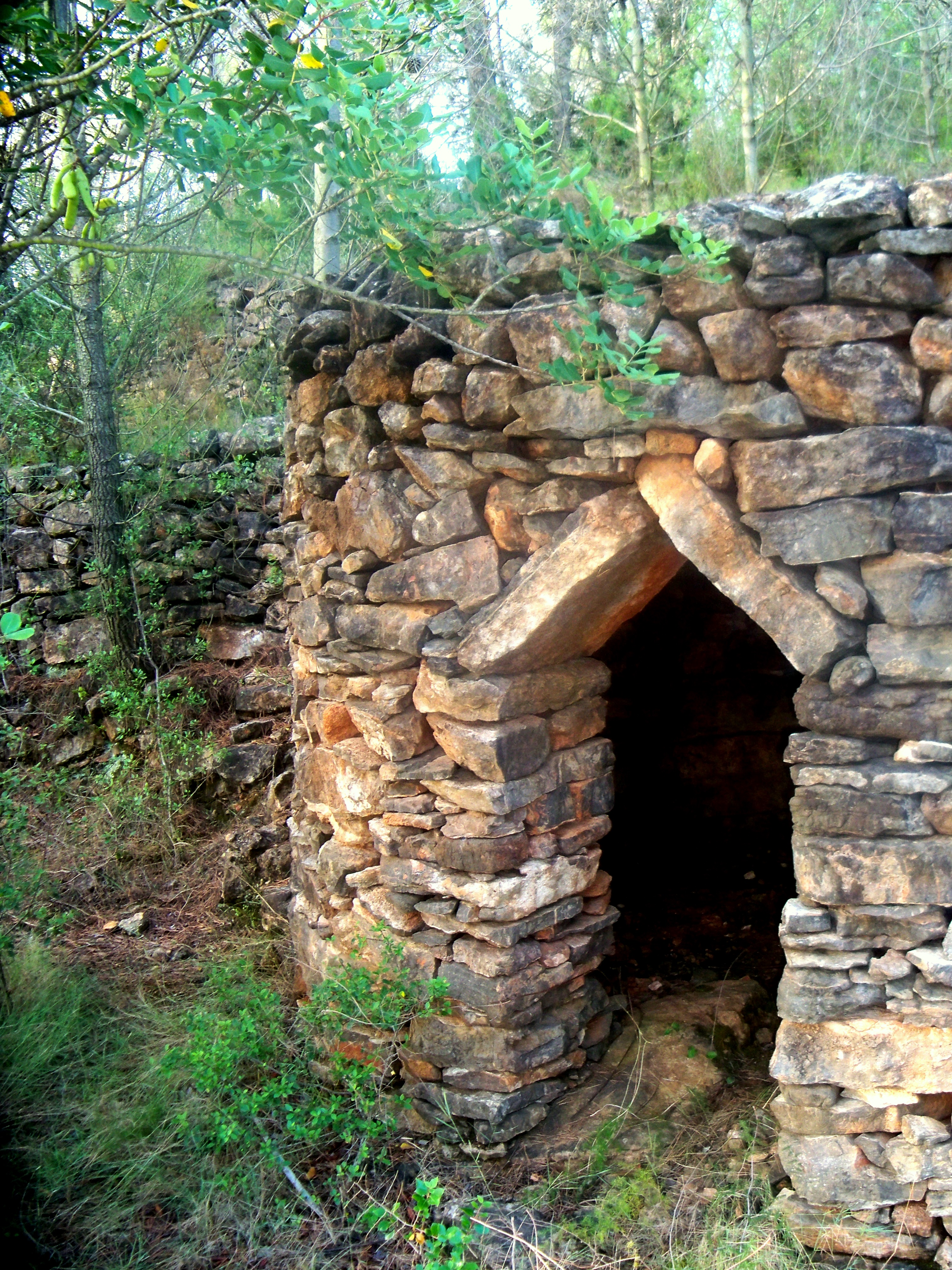
Dry stone shelter at Tales, Plana Baixa, Valencia, Spain, with its entrance topped by two slabs pitted against each other to form a triangular arch

Another variation is the Cornish hedge or Welsh clawdd, which is a stone-clad earth bank topped by turf, scrub, or trees and characterised by a strict inward-curved batter (the slope of the "hedge"). As with many other varieties of wall, the height is the same as the width of the base, and the top is half the base width.

Different regions have made minor modifications to the general method of construction—sometimes because of limitations of building material available, but also to create a look that is distinctive for that area. Whichever method is used to build a dry stone wall, considerable skill is required. Correcting any mistakes invariably means disassembling down to the level of the error. Selection of the correct stone for every position in the wall makes an enormous difference to the lifetime of the finished product, and a skilled waller will take time making the selection.

As with many older crafts, skilled wallers are few in number today. Fields can be fenced with much less time and expense using modern wire fencing compared to stone walls; however, the initial expense of building dykes is offset by their sturdiness and consequent long, low-maintenance lifetimes. As a result of the increasing appreciation of the landscape and heritage value of dry stone walls, wallers remain in demand, as do the walls themselves. A nationally recognised certification scheme is operated in the UK by the Dry Stone Walling Association, with four grades from Initial to Master Craftsman.

Notable examples include the Mourne Wall, a 22-mile (35 km) wall in the Mourne Mountains in County Down, Northern Ireland, and the wall around the Ottenby nature reserve, built by Charles X Gustav in the mid-17th century in Öland, Sweden.

== Other uses ==
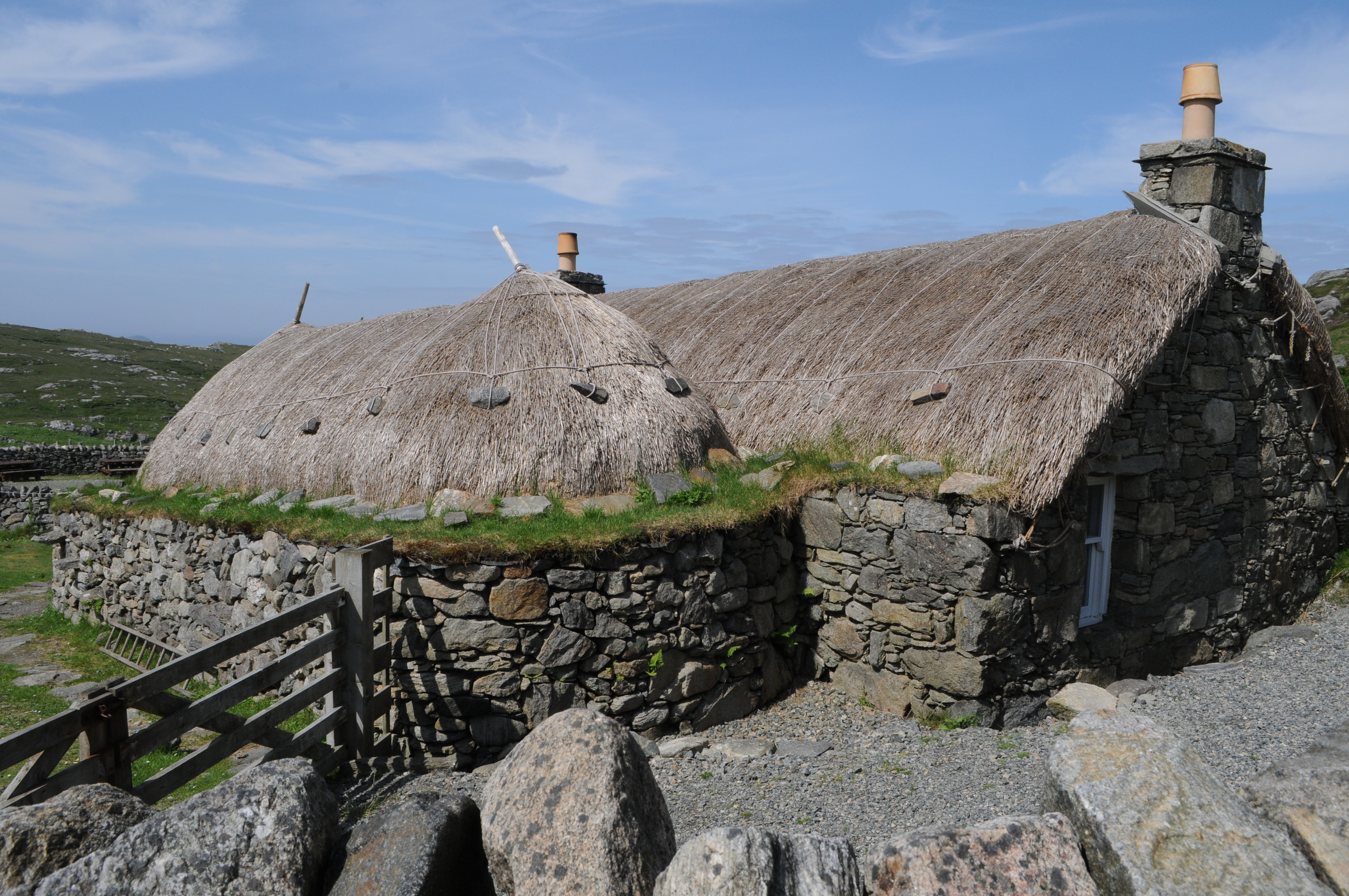
The Gearrannan Blackhouse Village, Garenin, in the Outer Hebrides of Scotland

While the dry stone technique is most commonly used for the construction of double-wall stone walls and single-wall retaining terracing, dry stone sculptures, buildings, fortifications, bridges, and other structures also exist.

Traditional turf-roofed Hebridean blackhouses were constructed using the double-wall dry stone method. The middle of the walls were generally filled with earth or sand in order to eliminate draughts. During the Iron Age, and perhaps earlier, the technique was also used to build fortifications such as the walls of Eketorp Castle (Öland, Sweden), Maiden Castle, North Yorkshire, Reeth, Dunlough Castle in southwest Ireland and the rampart of the Long Scar Dyke. Many of the dry-stone walls that exist today in Scotland can be dated to the 14th century or earlier when they were built to divide fields and retain livestock. Some extremely well built examples are found on the lands of Muchalls Castle.

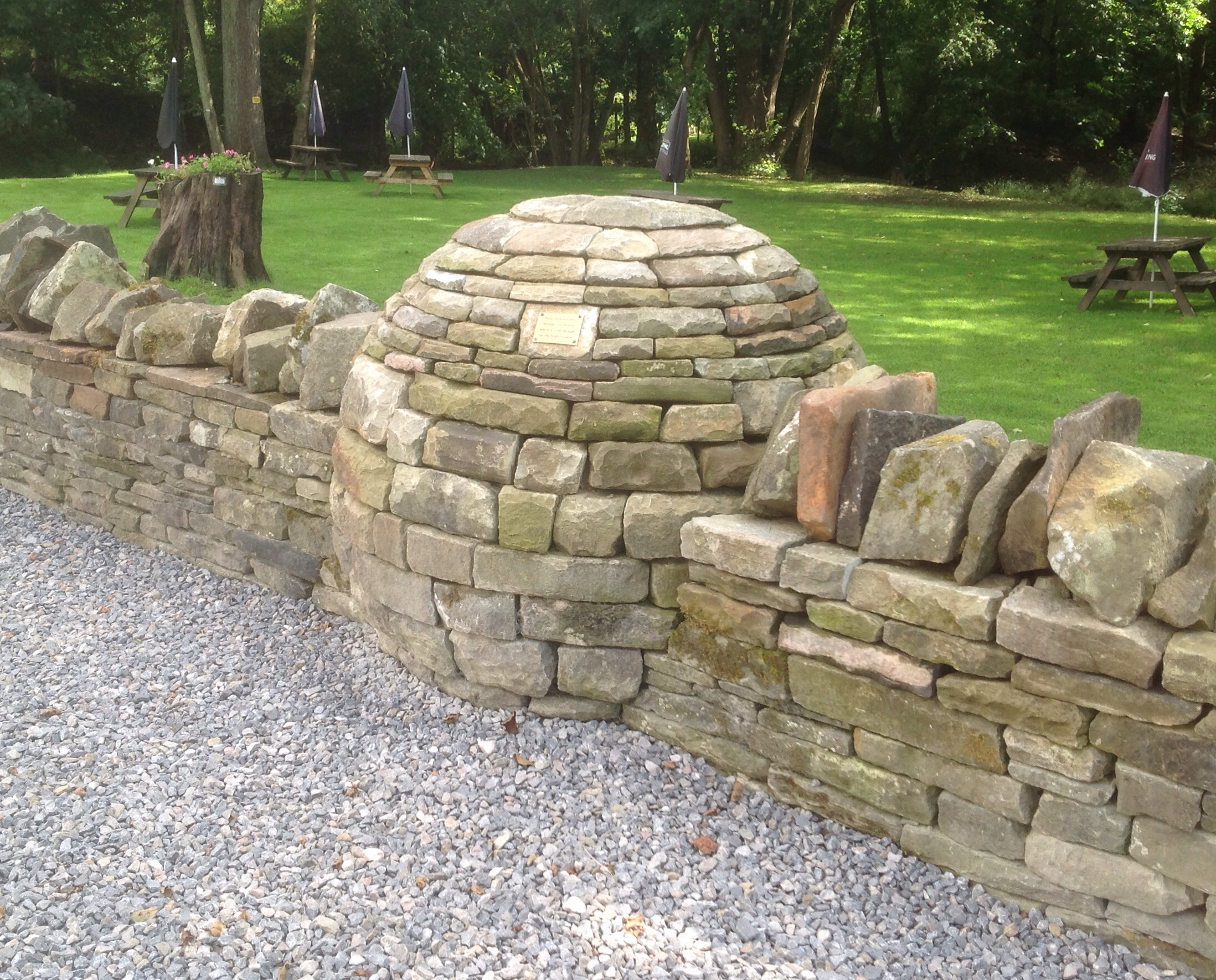
Boundary wall of a pub featuring a dry stone sculpture, in the Forest of Dean, Gloucestershire, UK

Dry stone walls can be built against embankments or even vertical terraces. If they are subjected to lateral earth pressure, they are retaining walls of the type gravity wall. The weight of the stones resists the pressure from the retained soil, including any surcharges, and the friction between the stones causes most of them to act as if they were a monolithic gravity wall of the same weight. Dry stone retaining walls were once built in great numbers for agricultural terracing and also to carry paths, roads and railways. Although dry stone is seldom used for these purposes today, a great many are still in use and maintained. New ones are often built in gardens and nature conservation areas. Dry stone retaining structures continue to be a subject of research.

In northeastern Somalia, on the coastal plain 20 km (12 mi) to Aluula's east are ruins of an ancient monument in a platform style. The structure is formed by a short rectangular dry stone wall; the gaps are filled with rubble and covered with small stones. Relatively large standing stones are also positioned on the edifice's corners. Near the platform are graves outlined in stones. Measuring 24 by 17 m (79 by 56 ft), the structure is the largest of a string of ancient platform and enclosed platform monuments exclusive to far northeastern Somalia.

In Great Britain, Ireland, France and Switzerland, it is possible to find small dry stone structures built as markers for mountain paths or boundaries of owned land. In many countries, cairns, as they are called in Scotland, are used as road and mountaintop markers.

== Gallery ==
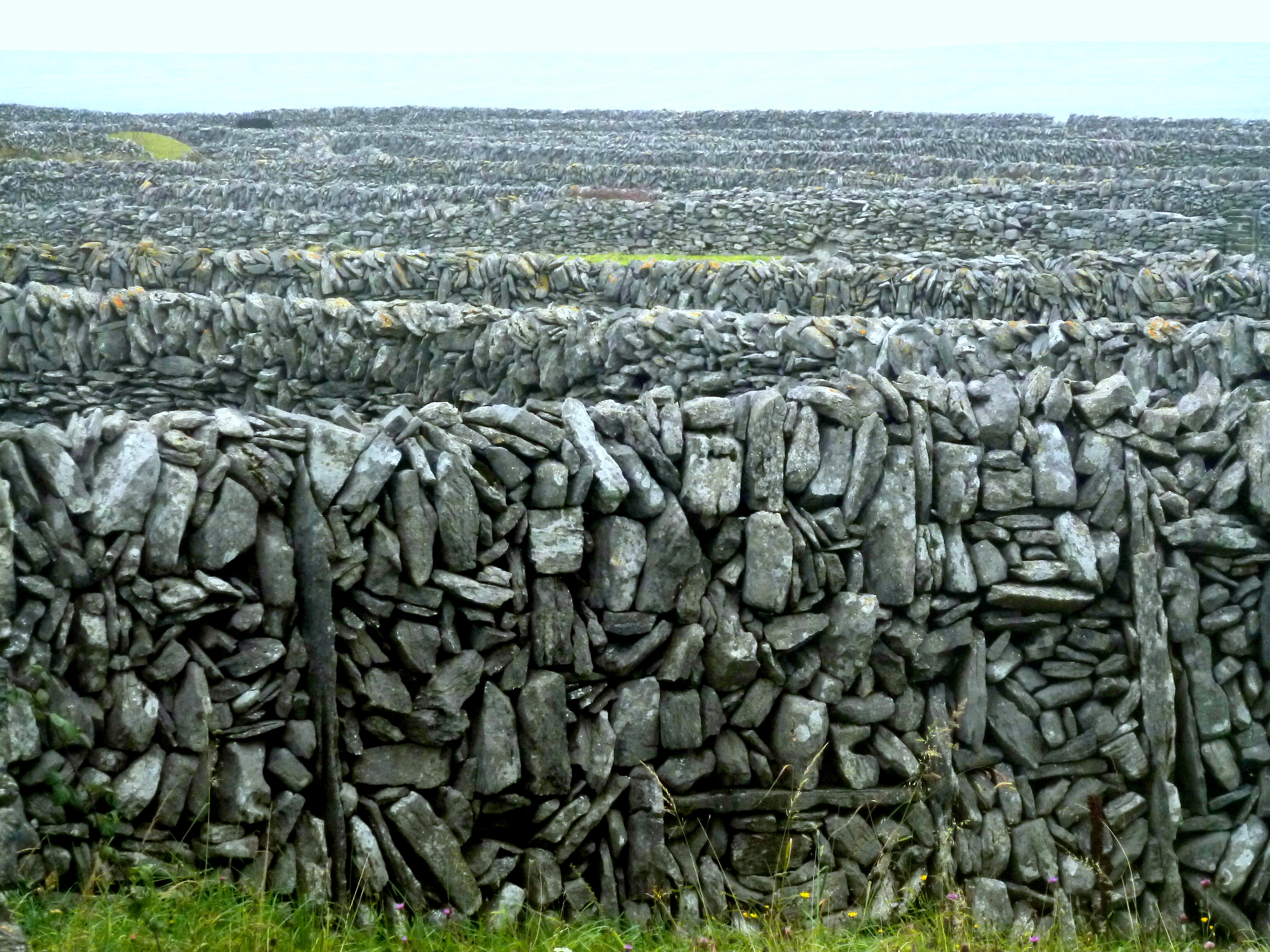
Dry stone, Feidin walls, Inisheer, Ireland

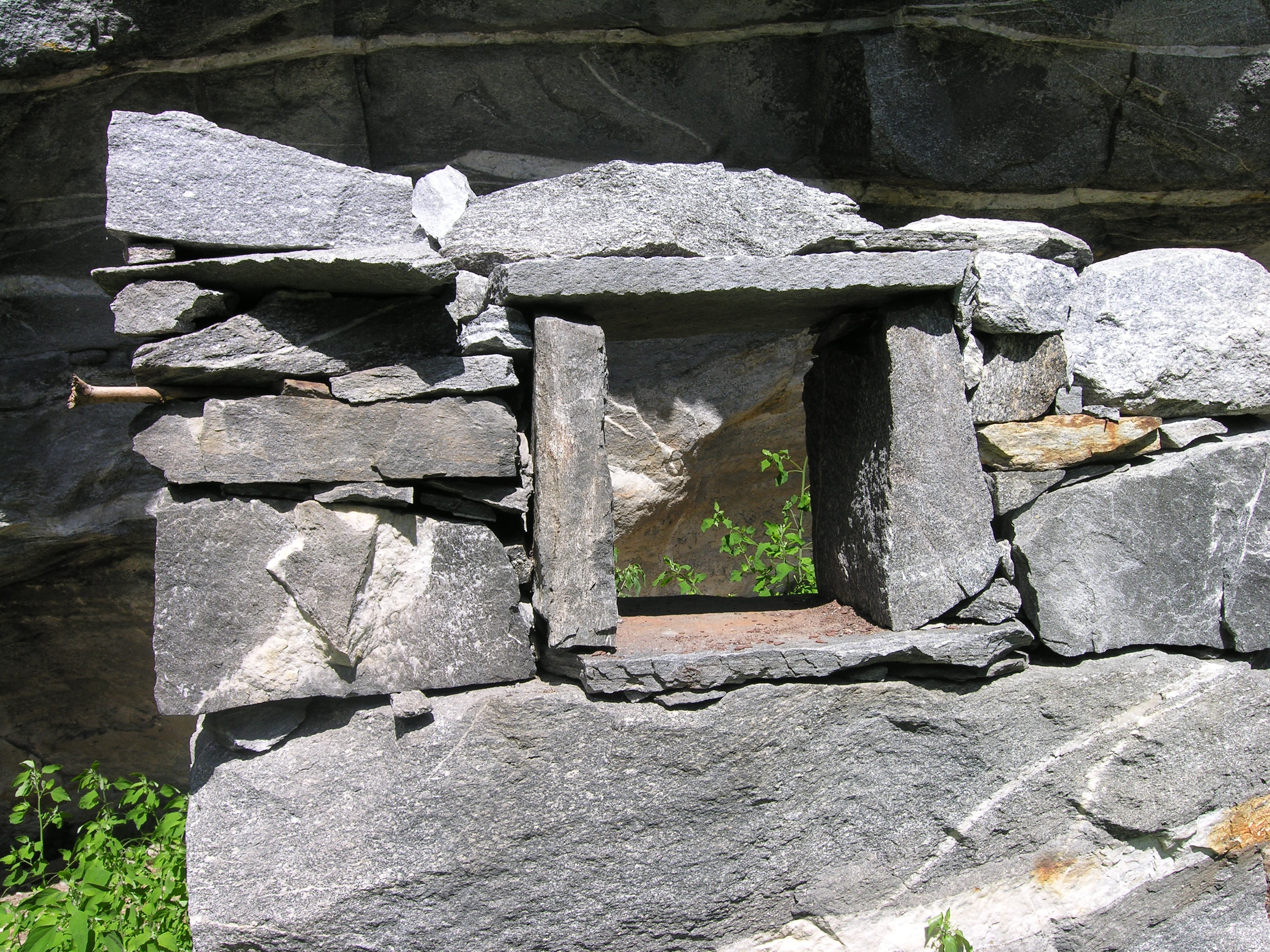
Dry stone wall with window in Bignasco, Switzerland (Swiss-Italian part)

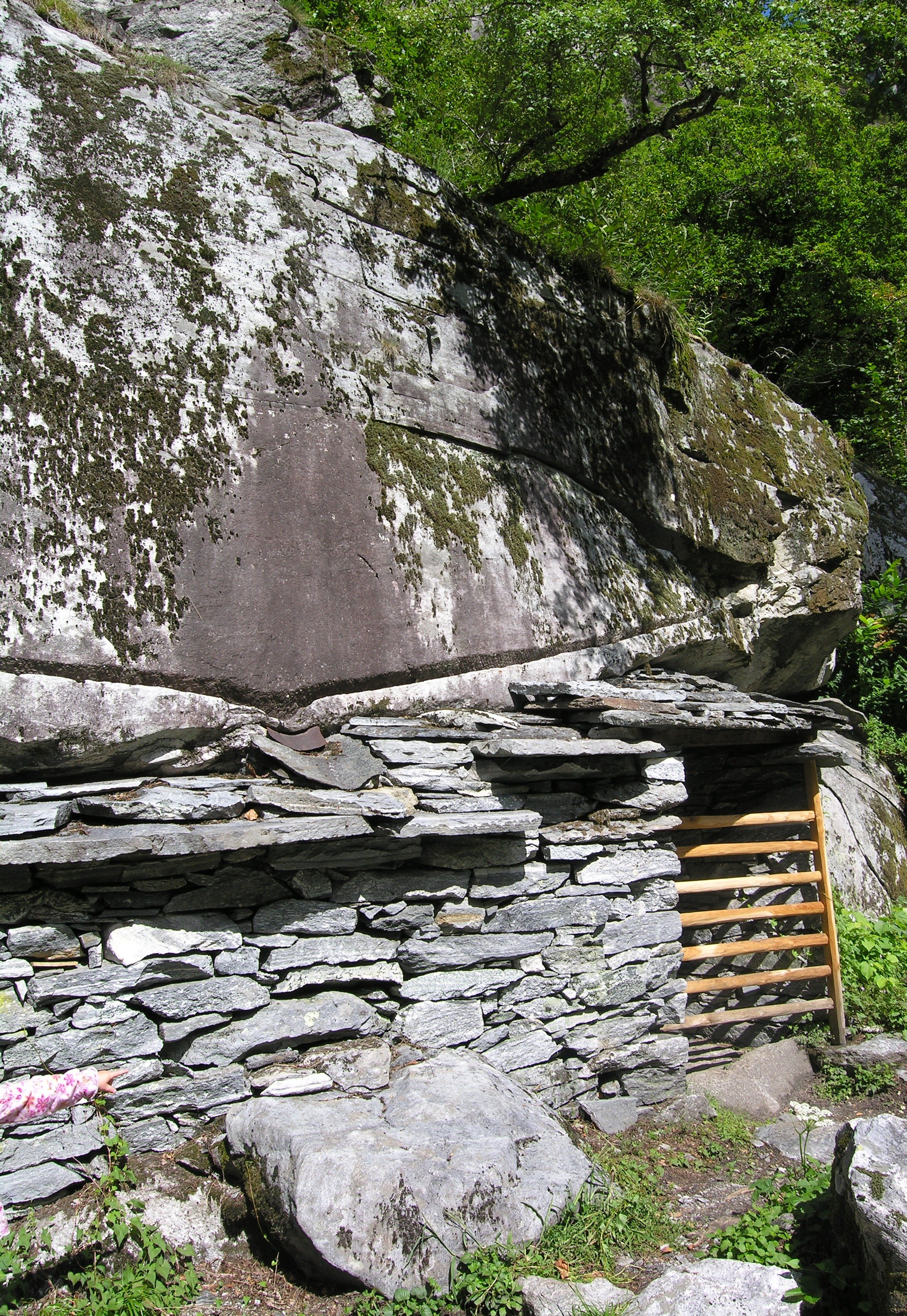
Adding a dry stone wall to convert the space under a large rock into a functional building near Bignasco, Switzerland

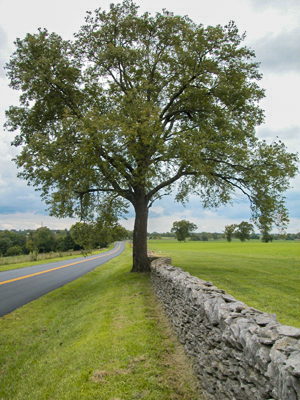
Fence of local limestone in Bluegrass region of central Kentucky

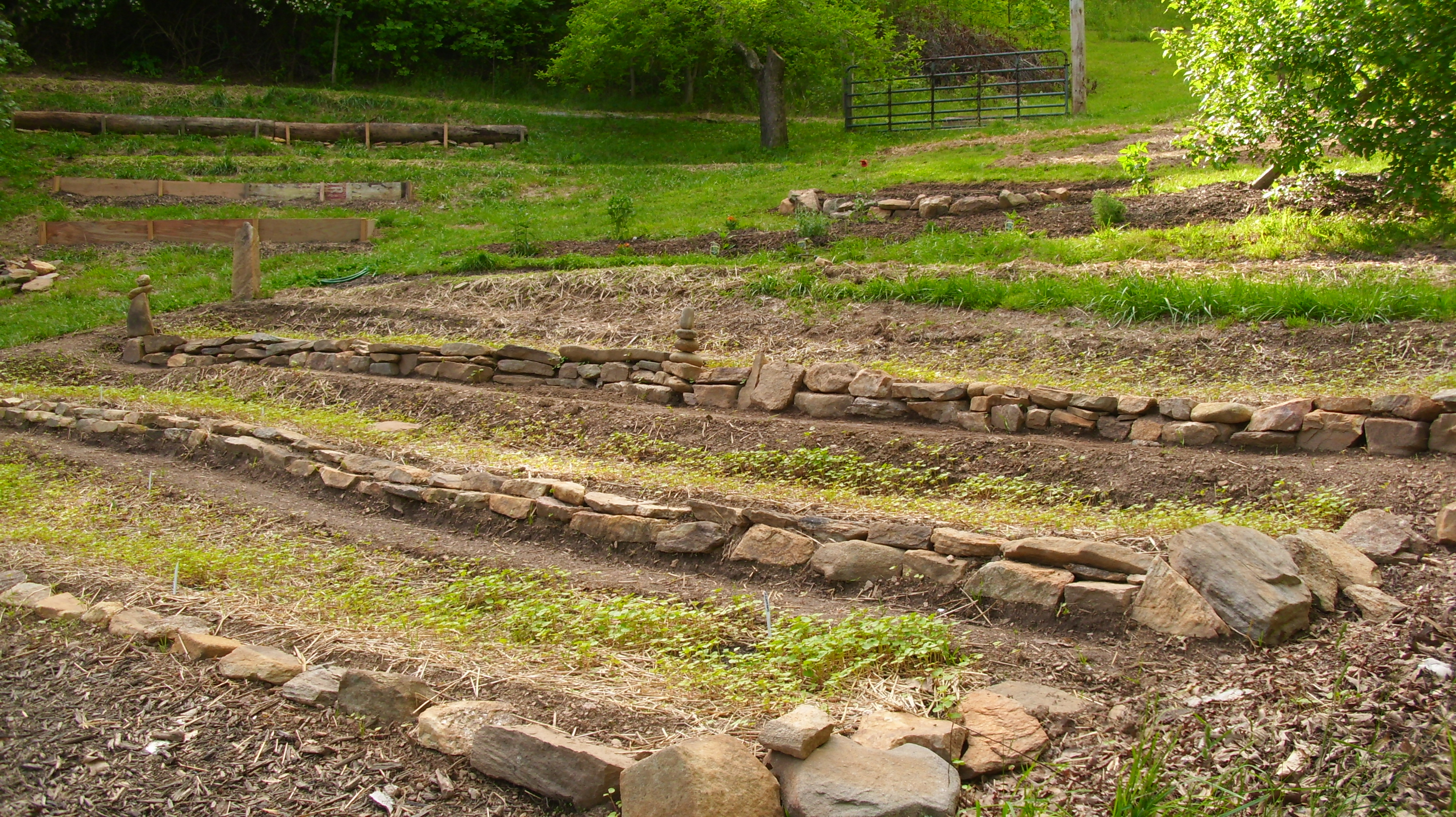
A stone terrace created using dry stack techniques in North Carolina

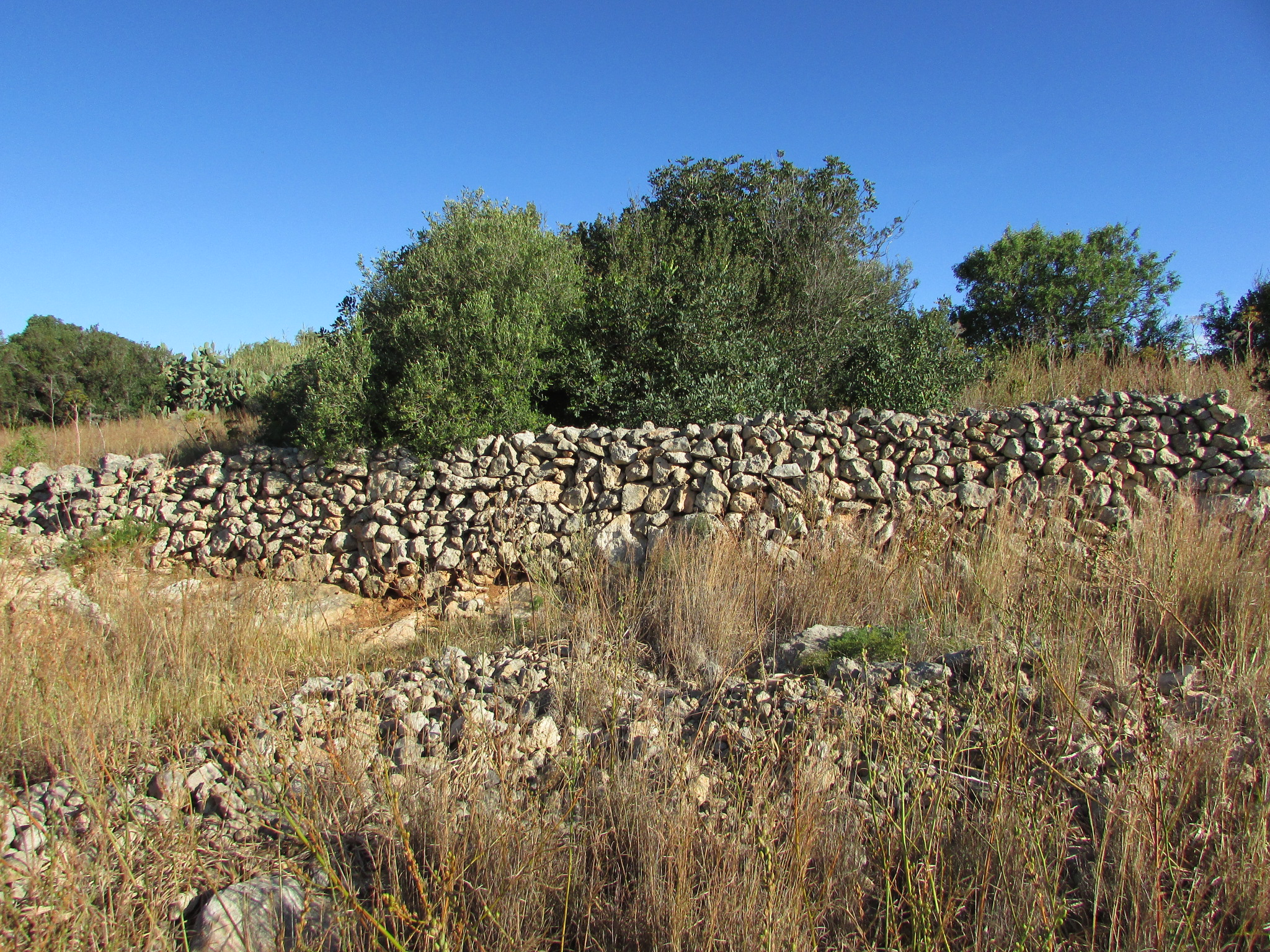
Dry stone wall in Mgarr, Malta

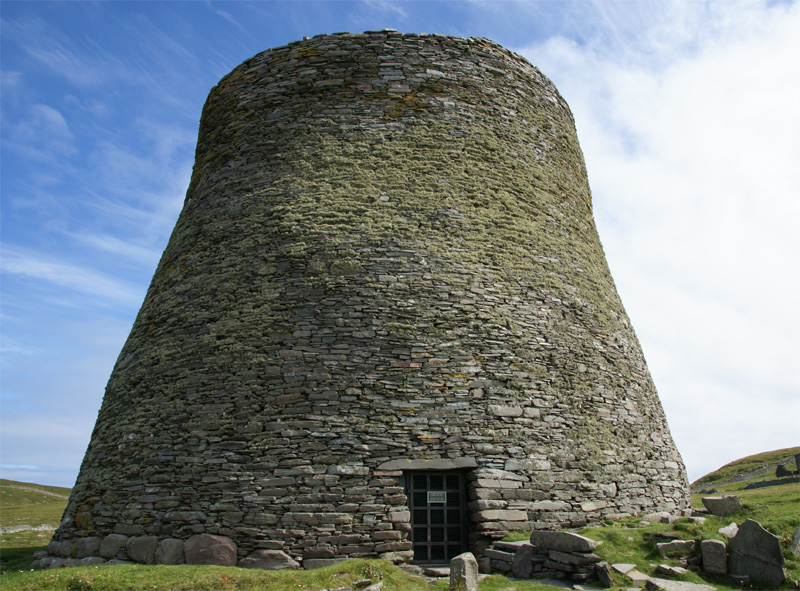
Iron Age Broch, Scotland

== See also ==
- Anathyrosis (Greece)
- Broch (Scotland)
- Building material
- Cabanes du Breuil (France)
- Dry stone hut
- Great Zimbabwe (Zimbabwe)
- Machu Picchu (Peru)
- Mending Wall (US)
- Nuraghe (Sardegna)
- Sacsahuamán
- Stone industry
- Stora Alvaret (Sweden)
- Trullo (Italy)
- Village des Bories (France)
- Stonemasonry
