= Maiden Castle =

Maiden Castle or the Maiden's Castle may refer to:

== Historical fortifications in England ==
Maiden derives from the Celtic Mai Dun which means 'great hill'.

- Maiden Castle, Cheshire, an Iron Age hill fort
- Maiden Castle, Cumbria, a Roman fortlet
- Maiden Castle, Dorset, an Iron Age hill fort
- Maiden Castle, Durham, an Iron Age promontory fort
- Maiden Castle, North Yorkshire, an Iron Age settlement

== Historical fortifications in Scotland ==
- Maiden Castle, Fife, an Iron Age fort

== Other ==
- Maiden Castle (Antarctica), in the Allan Hills
- Maiden Castle (Iran), an alternative name for Ghal'eh Dokhtar in Iran
- Maiden Castle (novel), 1936 novel by English writer John Cowper Powys
- Maiden Castle sports centre, university sports complex in Durham, England

== See also ==
- Maiden (disambiguation)
- Castle of the Maidens (Latin: Castellum Puellarum), an alternative name for Edinburgh Castle in Scotland
- Mai-Dun, a symphonic rhapsody of 1921 by composer John Ireland
