= Maiden Castle, North Yorkshire =

Historic settlement in North Yorkshire, England

Maiden Castle
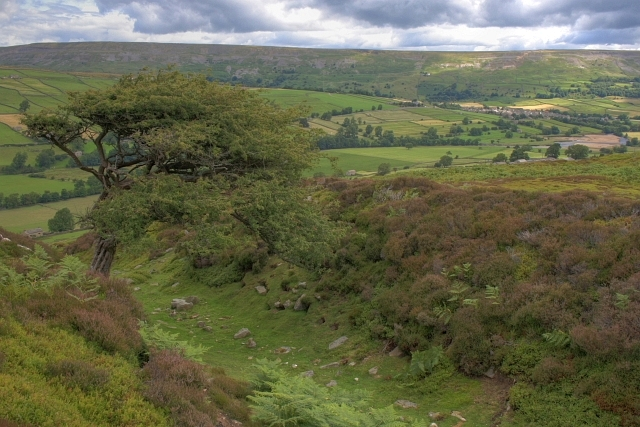
- Earthworks at Maiden Castle

- Location within North Yorkshire

General information
- Location: Grinton, North Yorkshire, England
- Coordinates: 54.37826°N 1.967872°W

Technical details
- Size: 7,000 m^{2} (1.7 acres)

Maiden Castle is a settlement in Grinton, North Yorkshire (grid reference SE02189808) which probably dates from the Iron Age. It is listed as a scheduled monument. The name Maiden Castle is not unique to the site and occurs in several other places in Britain and probably means a "fortification that looks impregnable" or one that has never been taken in battle.

The site measures 108 by 88 m (354 by 289 ft), covering about 7,000 m^{2} (1.7 acres), and is pear-shaped. An avenue leading to the entrance of the settlement is a unique feature. Maiden Castle has been described as a banjo enclosure due to its shape, however this description has been disputed. If it is a banjo enclosure, it would be one of just two in northern England, the other being Fremington Dykes.

The only dating evidence recovered from Maiden Castle is a "post-and-panel building" which is typologically similar to a structure discovered in Healaugh that has been dated to the late Iron Age or Romano-British periods.
