= Losey =

Losey is a surname. Notable people with the surname include:

- Brian L. Losey, Rear Admiral, U.S. Navy; Commander, Combined Joint Task Force - Horn of Africa
- Frank H. Losey (1872–1931), musician, composer, and arranger of band and orchestra music
- Greg Losey (1950–2002), American pentathlete
- Joseph Losey (1909–1984), American theater and film director
  - Gavrik Losey (born 1938), son of Joseph, film producer and production manager
    - Luke Losey (born 1968), son of Gavrik, film director, lighting designer and photographer
    - Marek Losey (born 1971), son of Gavrik, British-American film director and the third generation of film maker in the Losey family
- Robert M. Losey (1908–1940), aeronautical meteorologist, considered first U.S. military casualty in World War II

== See also ==
- Losey Army Airfield, former U.S. Army Air Forces air base, Puerto Rico
- Losee (disambiguation)
