= Reginald Beck =

British film editor (1902–1992)

- Born: 5 February 1902; St. Petersburg, Russia
- Died: 12 July 1992 (aged 90); Cookham, England
- Occupation: film editor
- Spouse: Irene Beck
- Parent(s): Ernest Beck, Helena Beck

Reginald Beck (5 February 1902 – 12 July 1992) was a British film editor with forty-nine credits from 1932 to 1985. He is noted primarily for films done with Laurence Olivier in the 1940s and with Joseph Losey in the 1960s and 1970s.

His sister, Violet Hélène (called "Helen"), was wife of actor Peter Cushing.

== Early life and career ==
Beck was born in Russia to a British father and Finnish mother. His family moved back to Britain when Beck was thirteen. He began working in the film industry in 1927 when he joined Gainsborough Pictures before going on to work on "quota quickies" at Wembley Studios. He later worked with a number of directors including Carol Reed, David Lean, Laurence Olivier and Joseph Losey.

== Collaboration with Joseph Losey ==
Joseph Losey was an American film and theatre director who emigrated to Britain in the 1950s after being blacklisted for work in the entertainment industry in the United States. Beck and Losey collaborated on sixteen films from The Gypsy and the Gentleman (1958) through to Steaming (1985), which was both Beck's and Losey's last film. Until about 1964, Losey actually worked primarily with Reginald Mills, who had edited the very first of Losey's British films in 1954. Mills edited The Servant (1963), which was the first of Losey's films with a screenplay written by Harold Pinter, a playwright who ultimately received the Nobel Prize in Literature in 2005. After a public falling-out between Mills and Pinter, Beck edited essentially all of Losey's subsequent films.

In his comprehensive obituary, Anthony Sloman singles out Accident (1967) as the pinnacle of their filmmaking, writing "There is a sustained exterior hold in Accident that is totally of the cutting room: it is breathtaking in its audacity, and became influential in its style." The film was the second collaboration between Losey and Harold Pinter. Roy Perkins and Martin Stollery single out the editing of The Go-Between (1971), the third and last film of the Losey-Pinter collaboration, writing that "sharply cut, initially cryptic alternations between time-past and time-present are deftly integrated into the narrative.".

One of the last films that Beck edited with Losey was Don Giovanni (1979), which was a French-Italian production based on the opera by Mozart. Nicholas Wapshott wrote recently that "One near perfect amalgamation of opera and the screen is Joseph Losey's Don Giovanni." For this film, Beck received the César Award for Best Editing, which is given mostly to highly regarded French productions; it was the only such distinction in Beck's long career.

Sloman concludes of Beck and Losey's collaboration, "Their professional and personal relationship was regarded as one of the great screen partnerships".

== Collaboration with Laurence Olivier ==
Earlier in his career, Beck worked on two films directed by Laurence Olivier, Henry V (1944) and Hamlet (1948). Both are adaptations of plays by William Shakespeare. Olivier, who is known mostly as a distinguished stage and screen actor, played the title roles in addition to directing the films. They were the first films he had directed, and Beck was Olivier's advisor during filming in addition to his subsequent editing. Sloman wrote of these two "masterpieces' that "Beck's contribution to both Henry V and Hamlet is so immense, so considerable, that film historians today tend to gloss over it, not fully understanding the role of the editor in addition to physically cutting the film." Sloman concludes his obituary of Beck, "above all, it is for his immense contributions to Henry V and Hamlet that the British film industry is forever in his debt."

== Selected filmography ==
Beck was credited as the editor for these films except as noted; the credits are based on the listing at the Internet Movie Database except as indicated by an additional citation. The director for each film is indicated in parentheses.

- The Return of Raffles (Markham-1932).
- Death at Broadcasting House (Denham-1933).
- Late Extra (Parker-1935)
- Blue Smoke (Ince-1935). Quota quickie.
- Wedding Group (Bryce & Gullan-1936). Quota quickie.
- Find the Lady (Grillette-1936). Quota quickie.
- Calling All Ma's (Davis-1937). Quota quickie.
- Variety Hour (1937)
- Father O'Nine (Kellino-1938)
- This Man Is News (MacDonald-1938). Quota quickie, and "Beck's first sizeable success".
- The Stars Look Down (Reed-1940).
- Freedom Radio (Asquith-1941).
- Quiet Wedding (Asquith-1941).
- In Which We Serve (Coward and Lean-1942).
- Henry V (Olivier-1944). The film's credits read "Produced and directed by Laurence Olivier in close collaboration with the editor Reginald Beck."
- Journey Together (Boulting-1945). Supervising editor.
- They Made Me a Fugitive (Cavalcanti-1947). Supervising editor.
- Hamlet (Olivier-1948). Associate producer; Helga Cranston edited. Anthony Bushell was an assistant producer. Soon after, Beck edited Bushell's first film as a director, The Angel with the Trumpet.
- The Angel with the Trumpet (Bushell-1950). Supervising editor.
- The Long Dark Hall (Beck and Bushell-1951). The only film that Beck directed; Penelope Houston wrote "The tandem direction is surprisingly able and occasionally inventive."
- The Wonder Kid (Hartl-1952). Hartl directed the original Austrian film that was adapted by Bushell and Beck for The Angel with the Trumpet.
- The Beggar's Opera (Brook-1953). A musical produced by and starring Laurence Olivier.
- Island in the Sun (Rossen-1957). This was a "prestigious" film, produced by Darryl F. Zanuck as his first film that was independent of the Hollywood studios, with a famed director and a cast of stars of the day.
- Harry Black (Fregonese-1958)
- The Gypsy and the Gentleman (Losey-1958). Beck's first film with Losey.
- Serious Charge (Young-1959)
- Eva (Losey-1962)
- The Leather Boys (Furie-1964)
- Modesty Blaise (Losey-1966)
- Robbery (Yates-1967). This film and its car chase led to Peter Yates' opportunity to direct Bullitt (1968). The car chase in Bullitt is one of the best-known in cinema history, and likely won the Academy Award for Best Film Editing for its editor, Frank P. Keller.
- Accident (Losey-1967)
- Boom! (Losey-1968)
- Secret Ceremony (Losey-1968)
- The Go-Between (Losey-1971)
- The Assassination of Trotsky (Losey-1972)
- Galileo (Losey-1974)
- The Romantic Englishwoman (Losey-1975)
- Mr. Klein (Losey-1976; as "direction consultant")
- Despair (Fassbinder-1978). Unusually for Fassbinder, Despair involved some highly notable collaborators including Tom Stoppard (screenplay) and Dirk Bogarde (starring), as well as Beck. Beck's editing was largely redone by Fassbinder and Juliane Lorenz.
- Roads to the South (Losey-1978)
- Don Giovanni (Losey-1979)
- Steaming (Losey-1985)

== See also ==
- List of film director and editor collaborations
