= Thomas Wiseman =

British writer (1931–2018)

Thomas Wiseman (born Alphons Weissmann, Vienna, 1931 - 29 August 2018) was a British author, playwright and screenwriter.

== Life ==
Thomas Wiseman was born in Vienna in January 1931 of Jewish parentage. He escaped to England with his mother in 1939, shortly before the outbreak of war. His father, an officer in the First World War, had arranged their escape with his contacts in high places, but he remained behind, believing he could rely on these "contacts" to protect him. In this he was ultimately to be proved mistaken, and he died in Buchenwald concentration camp. Elements of this story have featured in three of Wiseman's novels, The Quick and the Dead, Journey of A Man, The Time Before the War, and in his play The Dealer.

After the war Wiseman began his career in journalism, aged 16, on a London local newspaper, the West London Observer, where he worked as a reporter and wrote film, theatre and book reviews. These got him banned from press showings for the critics, but also brought him to the attention of Lord Beaverbrook. As a result, he was hired by the London Evening Standard to write their showbiz column.

Reviewing Wiseman's first novel, Czar, in the Sunday Times Frederic Raphael wrote: "Thomas Wiseman used to be the columnist the film companies wouldn't have on the set, so savage (and so right?) were his judgements. It was said that he was a dagger pointed at the industry." This novel drew on Wiseman's knowledge of Hollywood and the film business, and its commercial success enabled him to work full-time on writing books.

His second novel, Journey of A Man, and his third novel, The Quick and the Dead, focused on his family history, especially his father's activities in Vienna under the Nazis seeking to ransom Jews able to pay for their lives. The Quick and the Dead earned him a Jewish Chronicle Book Award. The TLS wrote of it: "...a harshly funny and effective study of Nazi self-delusion and atrocity...brilliantly achieved."

For his next novel, The Romantic Englishwoman, Wiseman wrote a story of a novelist who describes in fictional form his wife's sexual encounter with a sponging self-styled poet in Baden-Baden, and the novelist's vivid imagination "begets the event". This novel was made into a film by Joseph Losey, with screenplay by Wiseman and Tom Stoppard, starring Glenda Jackson as the wife, Michael Caine as the novelist and Helmut Berger as the poet.

In his later works Wiseman returned again to the war, achieving commercial successes with The Day Before Sunrise and Savage Day.

With his novel, Genius Jack, he returned to the film business for subject matter.

In addition to his novels, Wiseman has written non-fiction works such as Cinema (a history) and The Money Motive, the psychoanalytical study of an obsession. He has also written two produced plays, The Private Prosecutor, put on at the Royal Court Theatre in 1957, and The Dealer.

His journalism included three years writing a weekly column on the arts for The Guardian.

== Family ==
He was married to Malou Pantera, a former actress.

== Works ==
=== Books ===
Fiction

- Czar, 1965
- Journey of A Man, 1967.
- The Quick and the Dead, 1969.
- The Romantic Englishwoman, 1971.
- The Day Before Sunrise, 1976.
- A Game of Secrets, 1979.
- Savage Day, 1981.
- Children of the Ruins, 1986.
- Labyrinth, 1991.
- The Time Before the War, 1993.
- Genius Jack, 1999.

Non-fiction

- The Seven Deadly Sins of Hollywood, 1957.
- Cinema, 1964.
- The Money Motive, 1974.

=== Films ===
- The Romantic Englishwoman
