= Laurent Malet =

French actor

- Born: Laurent Marie Guespin-Malet; September 3, 1955 (age 70); France
- Occupation: Actor
- Known for: Les Possédés
- Relatives: Pierre Malet (brother)

Laurent Marie Guespin-Malet (born 3 September 1955 in Bayonne) is a French actor, and the twin brother of actor Pierre Malet.

== Life and career ==
Malet's stage debut came in La guerre de Troie n'aura pas lieu as Troilus alongside Claude Jade in 1975. In 1978 he was made famous by his role as Andrew alongside Donald Sutherland, Lisa Langlois and Stéphane Audran in Les Liens de Sang by Claude Chabrol. That same year, Gilles Béhat gave him the lead role in Haro. In 1979, he starred alongside Yves Montand in Les Routes du sud by Joseph Losey and played Lino Ventura's son in Jigsaw (L'Homme en colère). He also played Roger Bataille in Rainer Werner Fassbinder's Querelle (after Jean Genet), and starred alongside Sandrine Bonnaire in 1984's Tir à vue, directed by Marc Angelo. In 1995 he played Arthur Rimbaud in Marc Rivière's L'Homme aux semelles de vent.

Highly attached to his brother and mother, he was asked by the latter (in the terminal stages of a brain tumour) to put an end to her sufferings. He writes of this in his 2006 book En attendant la suite, in which he calls on the candidates in the presidential election to bring the state to legislate on euthanasia.

== Filmography ==
- Haro (1978), by Gilles Béhat
- Les Liens de Sang (1978), by Claude Chabrol
- Les Routes du Sud (1978), by Joseph Losey
- Comme un boomerang (1976), by José Giovanni
- Bobo Jacco (1979), by Walter Bal
- Le Cœur à l'envers (1980), by Franck Apprédéris
- La Légion saute sur Kolwezi (1980), by Raoul Coutard
- Querelle (1982), by Rainer Werner Fassbinder
- Invitation au voyage (1982), by Peter Del Monte
- A mort l'arbitre ! (1983), by Jean-Pierre Mocky
- Tir à vue (1984), by Marc Angelo
- Viva la vie (1984), by Claude Lelouch
- Parking (1985), by Jacques Demy
- La Puritaine (1986), by Jacques Doillon
- Charlie Dingo (1987), by Gilles Béhat
- Les Possédés (1988), by Andrzej Wajda
- Arthur Rimbaud, l'homme aux semelles de vent (1995), by Marc Rivière
- Le Plus beau pays du monde (1999), by Marcel Bluwal
- Ce jour-là (2003), by Raoul Ruiz

== Television ==
- 1976: Le siècle des lumières by Claude Brulé
- 1977: La foire by Roland Vincent
- 1981: Les avocats du diable d'André Cayatte
- 1981: Confusion of Feelings
- 1982: Pleine lune by Jean-Pierre Richard
- 1984: Cuore by Luigi Comencini
- 1985: La part de l'autre by Jeanne Labrune
- 1986: Sword of Gideon by Michael Anderson
- 1991: The First Circle by Sheldon Larry
- 1993: Monsieur Ripois by Luc Béraud
- 1994: Le feu follet by Gérard Vergez
- 1995: L'homme aux semelles de vent by Marc Rivière
- 1997: Marion du Faouët by Michel Favart
- 2001: Des croix sur la mer by Luc Béraud
- 2001: Le Prix de la vérité by Joël Santoni
- 2004: Les amants du bagne by Thierry Binisti
- 2005: Galilée ou l'amour de Dieu by Jean-Daniel Verhaeghe

== Réalisateur/Scénariste ==
- 1993 : Au nom d'un chien (short)
