= Janine Reiss =

French vocal coach (1921–2020)

Janine Reiss (23 November 1921 – 2 June 2020) was a French singing teacher and harpsichordist.

== Biography ==
A harpsichordist by training, Reiss specialised in the 1960s in preparing international opera singers for the French repertoire. For ten years, she worked alongside Maria Callas but also with Teresa Berganza, Mady Mesplé, Julia Migenes, Placido Domingo and Luciano Pavarotti. Director of musical studies at the Paris Opera from 1973-80, she then collaborated with opera houses and conductors around the world. Every summer, she directed the musical studies of the Chorégies d'Orange.

In 1978, she participated in the preparation of the film Don Giovanni by Joseph Losey, as musical advisor to the director and onscreen as a harpsichordist, accompanying all the recitatives. She made some incursions in the field of variety by making work, for example Mireille Mathieu, who she met in 1983 on the TV program Le Grand Échiquier, by Jacques Chancel. In 2003, Thierry Thomas and Pierre Bouteiller dedicated to her a documentary: Janine Reiss: L'Esprit de l'Opéra.

In January 2013, Dominique Fournier dedicated a book to her: La passion prédominante de Janine Reiss (preface by Alain Duault).

Reiss died on 2 June 2020, aged 99.
