= Don Giovanni (1979 film) =

1979 film by Joseph Losey

- Theatrical poster
- Directed by: Joseph Losey
- Written by: Rolf Liebermann; Joseph Losey; Patricia Losey; Renzo Rossellini; Frantz Salieri
- Based on: Don Giovanni (1787 opera) by Wolfgang Amadeus Mozart (music) and Lorenzo Da Ponte (libretto)
- Produced by: Joseph Losey; Robert Nador; Michel Seydoux
- Starring: Ruggero Raimondi; John Macurdy; Edda Moser; Kiri Te Kanawa; Kenneth Riegel; José van Dam; Teresa Berganza; Malcolm King; Eric Adjani
- Cinematography: Gerry Fisher
- Edited by: Reginald Beck
- Music by: Wolfgang Amadeus Mozart
- Production company: Gaumont; Caméra One; Opera Film Produzione; France 2; Janus Film; Opéra National de Paris
- Distributed by: Gaumont (France/Italy); Concorde Filmverleih (West Germany)
- Release dates: 6 November 1979 (New York City); 14 November 1979 (France); 16 March 1980 (West Germany)
- Running time: 185 minutes
- Country: France; Italy; West Germany
- Language: Italian
- Budget: US$7 million

Don Giovanni is a 1979 musical film directed and produced by Joseph Losey, based on Mozart's classic 1787 opera Don Giovanni, itself based on the Don Juan legend of a seducer, destroyed by his excesses. The film stars Ruggero Raimondi in the title role, along with John Macurdy, Edda Moser, Kiri Te Kanawa, Kenneth Riegel, José van Dam and Teresa Berganza. Mozart's score was conducted by Lorin Maazel and performed by the Orchestre de l'Opéra national de Paris.

The film was an international co-production between French, Italian, British, and West German companies. It premiered in New York City on 6 November 1971. The film was a critical success, earning César Awards for Best Production Design and Best Editing, as well as two BAFTA Award nominations. Nearly three decades after its release, Nicholas Wapshott called Don Giovanni a "near perfect amalgamation of opera and the screen".

== Plot ==
After an unsuccessful attempt to seduce Donna Anna, Don Giovanni kills her father Il Commendatore. The next morning, Giovanni meets Donna Elvira, a woman he previously seduced and abandoned. Later, Giovanni happens upon the preparations for a peasant wedding and tries to seduce the bride-to-be Zerlina, but his ambition is frustrated by Donna Elvira.

Donna Anna soon realizes that Giovanni killed her father, and she pursues the seducer along with her fiancé Don Ottavio. Ever ready to attempt a seduction, Giovanni woos Elvira's maid. As part of his plans, he switches clothes with his servant Leporello, who rapidly finds himself in trouble with people who mistake him for his master. Leporello flees and eventually meets Giovanni at the cemetery where Il Commendatore is buried. They jokingly invite the statue at his grave to dinner. While they are dining, the supernaturally animated statue arrives, and the horrified Giovanni is drawn into an open-pit fire.

== Cast ==
Role	Voice type	Actor
Don Giovanni	baritone	Ruggero Raimondi
Il Commendatore	bass	John Macurdy
Donna Anna	soprano	Edda Moser
Don Ottavio	tenor	Kenneth Riegel
Donna Elvira	soprano	Kiri Te Kanawa
Leporello	bass	José van Dam
Masetto	bass	Malcolm King
Zerlina	soprano	Teresa Berganza
Valet in Black	—N/a	Eric Adjani

== Production ==
In the opera, the action supposedly takes place in Spain, but Mozart's librettist Lorenzo Da Ponte wrote in Italian, and this film uses locations in Venice and Murano. In particular, the film features buildings by Palladio in and around the city of Vicenza (Basilica Palladiana, Villa Rotonda, Villa Caldogno and Teatro Olimpico).

Typically for a musical film, the singers recorded their aria performances separately, and lip-synched in their film performances. As Noel Megahey notes, "dragging the orchestra of the Opéra de Paris around the locations for the length of the production for a live recording is completely unfeasible." However, the recitatives were recorded live on-set, with the actors accompanied on harpsichord by Janine Reiss.

The total budget for the film was about $7,000,000.

== Style ==
The film is not a recording of a stage performance but "an original interpretation of the opera on film". Using the original libretto and music, it was directed as a musical film with a series of scenes, each using multiple cameras and takes. Four years earlier, Losey had directed a film version of Bertolt Brecht's play Galileo using a similar approach; Reginald Beck had also edited the earlier film, along with many others directed by Losey.

== Reception ==
=== Critical response ===
Following the 1979 theatrical release of the film, Vincent Canby complimented the singing but concluded that the filming "didn't work". He found the filmed closeups of the singers to be mostly jarring and ineffective. On the other hand, Judith Martin considered it successful. In 2007, Nicholas Wapshott wrote that "One near perfect amalgamation of opera and the screen is Joseph Losey's Don Giovanni".

=== Awards and nominations ===
Award	Year	Category	Nominee	Result	Ref.
British Academy Film Awards	1981	Best Costume Design	Frantz Salieri	Nominated	
British Academy Film Awards	1981	Best Sound	Jean-Louis Ducarme, Jacques Maumont	Nominated	
César Awards	1980	Best Film	Joseph Losey	Nominated	
César Awards	1980	Best Director	Joseph Losey	Nominated	
César Awards	1980	Best Editing	Reginald Beck	Won	
César Awards	1980	Best Production Design	Alexandre Trauner	Won	
David di Donatello	1980	Best Producer	Joseph Losey	Won	

== Home media ==
A Blu-ray and a region 1 DVD were released by Olive Films in 2013.
