= Louise Nicholson =

British historian and journalist

- Education: University of Edinburgh (MA Hons)
- Occupations: Journalist, author, lecturer
- Spouse: Nicholas Wapshott (m. 1980)
- Children: 2 sons
- Website: Louise's India & Save a Child

Louise Nicholson (born 1 May 1954) is a British arts journalist, author, and lecturer who focuses on the art and culture of India and London. Her many books are mainly about India and London.

Nicholson is the chair of the charity Save a Child. She and her husband Nicholas Wapshott live in New York City.

== Early life ==
She is the daughter of Royden Joseph Nicholson. She graduated with an MA honours degree from the University of Edinburgh in 1976.

== Career ==
Nicholson wrote for The Scotsman from 1973 to 1976, and for The Times from 1976 to 1983. She started working in 1976 at the Victorian Society. She later co-founded the Twentieth Century Society (at first named The Thirties Society) with Clive Aslet, Gavin Stamp and Bevis Hillier in 1978. She contributed to Aslet's The Best Buildings in Britain project (1980), searching the Church Commissioners' records for Grade A churches in England.

== Save a Child ==
Nicholson is the chair of the US chapter of Save a Child: Save a Child (America) Inc., a non-profit under the legal and regulatory framework of New York State. Save a Child, UK and US, are sponsors of the All Bengal Women's Union.

== Bibliography ==
Nicholson is a prolific travel author. In 1985 her guide to India was published; her guide to London followed in 1988. She has published more than 25 books, and her National Geographic Guides to India and London are in their third and fourth editions, respectively.

- Nicholson, Louise. National Geographic Traveler: London, 5th Edition. National Geographic (2011). ISBN 978-1-4262-0821-8
- Nicholson, Louise. National Geographic Traveler: India, 3rd Edition, National Geographic (2010). ISBN 978-1-4262-0595-8
- Nicholson, Louise. National Geographic Traveler: India, 1st Edition, National Geographic (1999). ISBN 978-1-4262-0023-6
- Nicholson, Louise. Illustrated Guide to Delhi, Agra & Jaipur, Guidebook Inc (1998). ISBN 978-962-217-491-7
- Nicholson, Louise. Illustrated Guide to Goa, Guidebook & Odyssey (1998). ISBN 978-962-217-415-3
- Nicholson, Louise. London Rediscovered, Frances Lincoln Publishers Ltd (1998). ISBN 978-0-7112-1187-2
- Nicholson, Louise. London (AA Citypack), AA Publishers (1996). ISBN 978-0-7495-1175-3
- Nicholson, Louise. Louise Nicholson's India Companion, with a new section on Pakistan, Headline Book Pub. Ltd (1996). ISBN 978-0-7472-7757-6
- Nicholson, Louise. Look Out London! Riverswift (1995). The Bodley Head Ltd. ISBN 978-1-898304-84-5
- Nicholson, Louise. The Festive Food of India and Pakistan, Trafalgar Square (1994). ISBN 978-1-85626-051-0
- Nicholson, Louise. Louise Nicholson's India Companion, with a new section on Pakistan, Vermilion (1994). ISBN 978-0-09-178315-0
- Nicholson, Louise. Fodor's London Companion, Fodor (1993). ISBN 978-0-679-02457-6
- Nicholson, Louise. Illustrated Guide to Delhi, Agra & Jaipur, Guidebook (1993). ISBN 978-962-217-297-5
- Nicholson, Louise. Illustrated Guide to Delhi, Agra & Jaipur, Odyssey Publications (1991). ISBN 978-962-217-179-4
- Nicholson, Louise. Louise Nicholson's India Companion, Century (1991). ISBN 978-0-7126-4794-6
- Nicholson, Louise. Louise Nicholson's India Companion, with a new section on Pakistan (1991). ISBN 978-0-7126-4795-3
- Nicholson, Louise. Babies' Names, Conran Octopus (1990). ISBN 978-1-85029-111-4
- Nicholson, Louise. London: Louise Nicholson's Definitive Guide, The Bodley Head Ltd (1990). ISBN 978-0-370-31453-2
- Nicholson, Louise. Collins Illustrated Guide to Delhi, Agra and Jaipur, Collins (1989). ISBN 978-0-00-215222-8
- Nicholson, Louise. India in Luxury" Century (1989). ISBN 978-0-7126-1643-0
- Nicholson, Louise. The Red Fort, Delhi (Travel to Landmarks Series), I. B. Tauris & Company (1989). ISBN 978-1-85043-173-2
- Nicholson, Louise. London: Louise Nicholson's Definitive Guide, The Bodley Head Ltd (1988). ISBN 978-0-370-31032-9
- Nicholson, Louise. India in Luxury, Century (1987). ISBN 978-0-7126-2099-4
- Nicholson, Louise. India in Luxury: A Practical Guide for the Discerning Traveller, Century (1986). ISBN 978-0-7126-1239-5
- Nicholson, Louise. The Baby Name Book (1985). Thorsons. ISBN 978-0-7225-1193-0
- Nicholson, Louise. India in Luxury: A Practical Guide for the Discerning Traveller, Century (1985). ISBN 978-0-7126-0857-2

== Family ==
In 1980, Nicholson married the journalist, author and broadcaster Nicholas Wapshott. They have two sons: William Henry Joseph Nicholson (born 1988), and Oliver Evelyn Samuel Nicholson (born 1990).
