= Losi =

Losi may refer to:

- Losi (mythology), a Polynesian mythological figure
- Losi Harford (born 1973), New Zealand cricketer
- Team Losi, a manufacturer of radio controlled models
- Giacomo Losi (1935-2024), Italian football defender

== See also ==
- Łosie (disambiguation)
