= Losee =

Losee may refer to:

== People ==
- Stephanie Losee (born 1965), American author, journalist, and cultural critic
- Frank Losee (1856–1937), American stage and screen actor
- William Losee (1757–1832), American minister

== Places ==
- Isaac Losee House, a historic building in Huntington, New York, United States
- John Losee House, a historic building in Watertown, New York, United States
- Losee Center, a building on the Utah Valley University campus

== Other ==
- Losee v. Clute, an American legal case

== See also ==
- Losie (disambiguation)
- Losey, a surname
