= Łosie =

Łosie or Losie may refer to the following places:

- Łosie, Gorlice County, Lesser Poland Voivodeship, south Poland
- Łosie, Nowy Sącz County, Lesser Poland Voivodeship, south Poland
- Łosie, Masovian Voivodeship, east-central Poland
- Łosie-Dołęgi, Podlaskie Voivodeship, north-eastern Poland
- Losie, West Virginia, a ghost town in the United States

== See also ==
- Losi (disambiguation)
- Losee (disambiguation)
