= Aero Club of East Africa =

Aeronautical club founded in Kenya

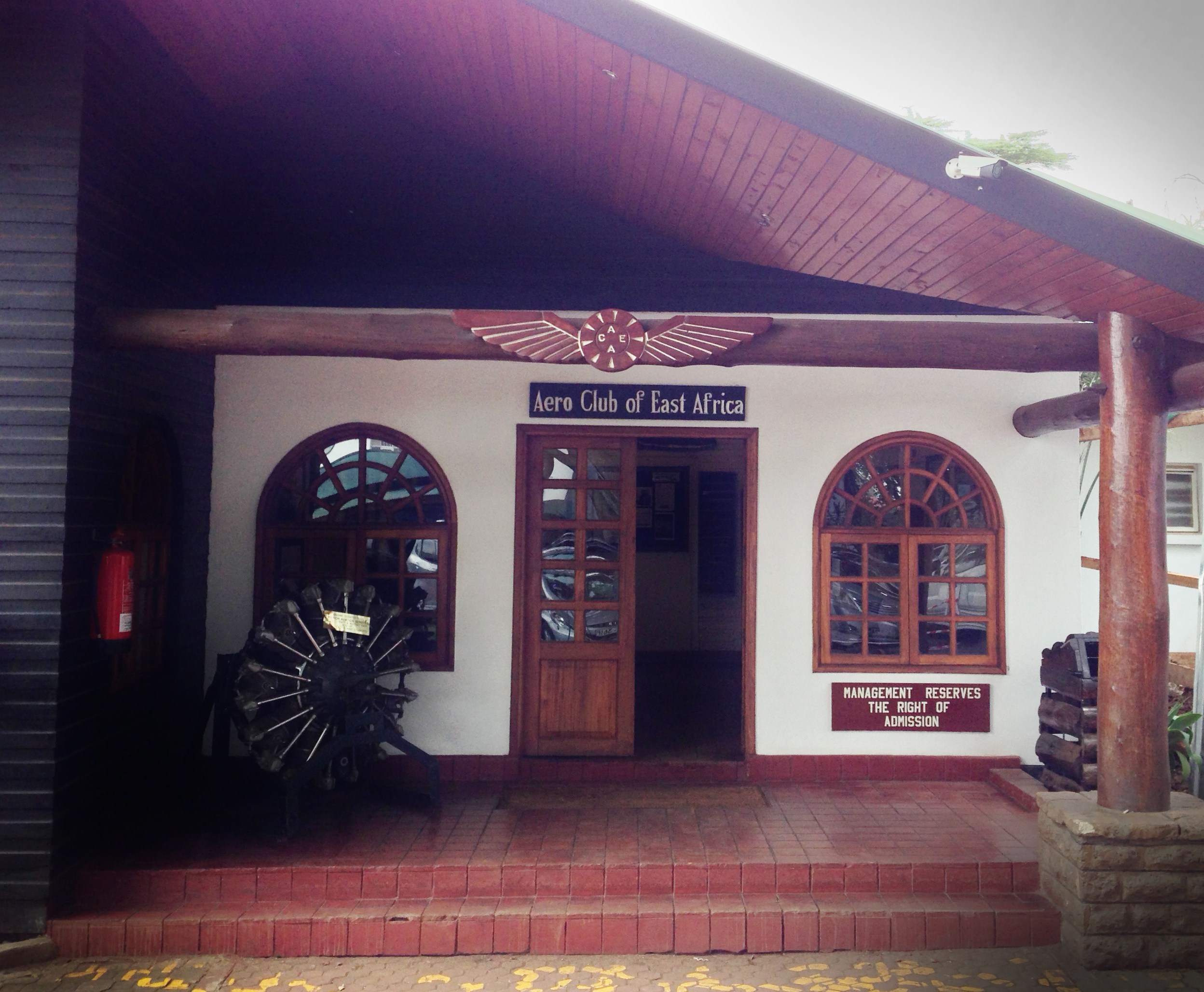
- Entrance to the Aero Club of East Africa at Wilson Airport in Nairobi, 2019
- Formation: 1927; 99 years ago
- Location: Nairobi, Kenya
- Website: www.aeroclubea.com

The Aero Club of East Africa was founded in Kenya in 1927. Built alongside Nairobi's Wilson Airport, the club featured prominently in 20th century African aeronautical history. The club remains active today and hosts facilities and events that are open to the public.

== Founding ==
The Aero Club of Kenya was founded on July 31, 1927. Its founding members included 24 pilots and aviation enthusiasts, who stated that the club's objectives were "To promote, encourage and regulate aeronautics in Kenya, and to provide information and advice about aviation to all authorities and persons as might be required." The club's initial location was the Dagoretti airstrip.

In March 1928 the club's first president Lieutenant Colonel A.C.E. Marsh renamed the club to the Aero Club of East Africa. The club advised the Kenyan government on the appropriate site for a Nairobi airport, and in 1929 the Nairobi Aerodrome airport was built at this location. The club's clubhouse was also placed on this site, overlooking what in 1933 would become the airport's first runways. Wild animals roamed the airstrip in the early years of the airport and Aero Club.

The club had 209 members when its clubhouse was built in 1929 and by 1933, 25 of those members had acquired flying licenses. In 1936 club member Beryl Markham was the first person to fly across the Atlantic Ocean from the east to the west, and in response the Aero Club gifted her lifelong membership. Markham had first learned to fly at the club in 1929.

== Second World War ==
During World War II the Aerodrome was reorganized by British military authorities and the Aero Club moved to a temporary location near the Nairobi Dam. Dozens of club members joined the war and were placed into a Kenya Auxiliary Air Unit, which saw combat in Europe and North Africa. Nineteen members were killed in the war. The clubhouse was returned to its original aerodrome site in 1947.

== Later years ==
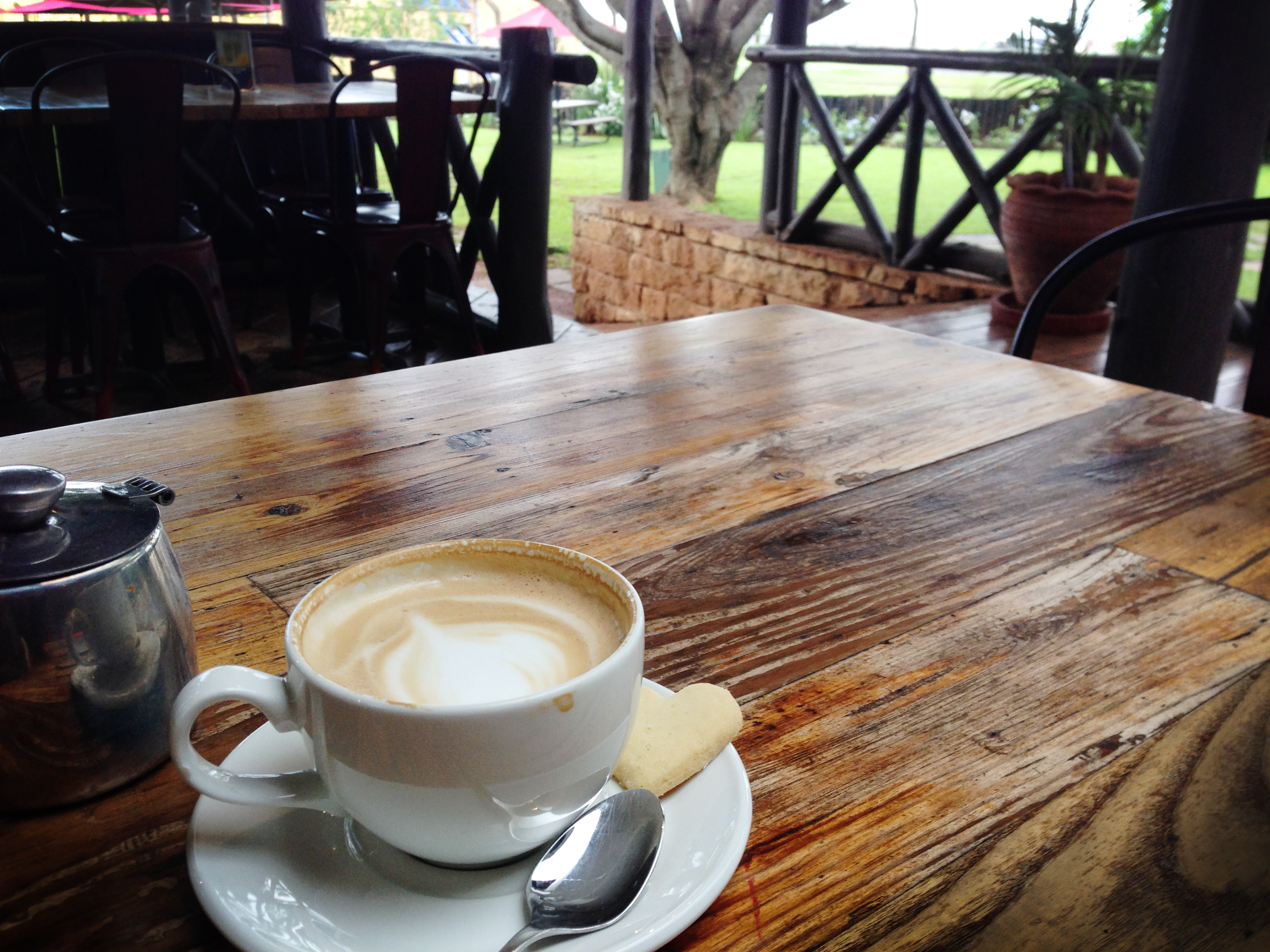
Coffee at the Aero Club of East Africa

Nairobi West Airport was renamed in 1962 to Wilson Airport, after Mrs. Florence Kerr Wilson, whose efforts were instrumental in developing the airport. The site hosted the flight services of the Kenya Wildlife Service, the Kenyan police, the Flying Doctor Service, and the Aero Club of East Africa. Through the 1950s, 60s and 70s the club grew in facilities and services. The club celebrated its 50th anniversary in 1977, hosting Markham as the evening's guest of honor.

Previously available only to club members, in 2013 the club opened its restaurant to the public with renovated cuisine.

The Aero Club organizes air shows that feature entertainment and practical demonstrations. The club's principal objective remains the improvement of aviation in East Africa.

== See also ==
- Royal Aero Club
