= The Return of Raffles =

1932 film

- Directed by: Mansfield Markham
- Written by: W.J. Balef
- Based on: A.J. Raffles stories by EW Hornung
- Produced by: Mansfield Markham
- Starring: George Barraud; Camilla Horn; Claud Allister
- Cinematography: Geoffrey Faithfull; Emil Schünemann
- Edited by: Reginald Beck
- Production company: Markham
- Release date: 27 September 1932
- Running time: 71 mins
- Country: United Kingdom
- Language: English

The Return of Raffles is a 1932 British crime film directed by Mansfield Markham and starring George Barraud, Camilla Horn and Claud Allister. It is based on the A.J. Raffles stories by EW Hornung and inspired by the success of the 1930 American film Raffles, to which it serves as a loose sequel. It was shot at the Walton Studios west of London.

== Cast ==
- George Barraud as A.J. Raffles
- Camilla Horn as Elga
- Claud Allister as Bunny
- A. Bromley Davenport as Sir John Truwode
- Sydney Fairbrother as Lady Truwode
- Harold Saxon-Snell as Von Spechen

== Bibliography ==
- Low, Rachael. Filmmaking in 1930s Britain. George Allen & Unwin, 1985.
- Wood, Linda. British Films, 1927–1939. British Film Institute, 1986.
