= Parking (1985 film) =

- Directed by: Jacques Demy
- Written by: Jacques Demy; Laurent Dussaux
- Produced by: Dominique Vignet
- Starring: Francis Huster; Laurent Malet; Jean Marais
- Cinematography: Jean-François Robin
- Edited by: Marie-Josée Audiard
- Music by: Michel Legrand
- Distributed by: Garance; FR3 Films Production
- Release date: 29 May 1985 (France)
- Running time: 95 minutes
- Country: France
- Language: French
- Box office: 142,035 admissions (France)

Parking is a French fantasy and musical film from 1985. It was directed and written by Jacques Demy, starring Francis Huster, Laurent Malet, and Jean Marais.

== Synopsis ==
The Orpheus myth repeats itself in the 20th century, paying tribute to Jean Cocteau's film classic Orphée (1950) by having the actor who played Orpheus appear as Hades.

Orpheus is a famous pop singer who composes love songs for Eurydice, his wife and sculptor who also designs his album covers; together they live alongside Aristée, his manager, and Calaïs, his sound engineer and lover, in a castle. During one of his concerts, an electrical malfunction briefly kills him and sends him to the Underworld, represented by a metro station and parking garage. Orpheus meets Charon, Hades, and Persephone, who agree to send him back to Earth as long as he doesn't reveal what he sees. Back on Earth, Persephone being sent to spy on Orpheus causes rifts between him and his lovers, as Calaïs admits to being jealous of Eurydice while Eurydice feels threatened by Persephone's attention. Meanwhile, Eurydice trades Orpheus concert tickets in exchange for drugs supplied by Dominique Daniel, leader of the Bacchantes; Eurydice and Orpheus have a violent argument over her drug usage and she refuses to attend his upcoming concert as a result.

As Orpheus wrestles with his lost muse and additional love for Calaïs, he finds that Eurydice has died of a drug overdose during his show. After failed attempts to get to the Underworld on his own, Persephone takes Orpheus to a cemetery to descend to the Underworld and ask for Eurydice back. Hades agrees, but imposes the condition that he not look at Eurydice until they've both reached the exit; to circumvent this, Orpheus ties her tourniquet around his eyes. Eurydice stops for a break and they have sex at one of Hades' motels. As the walk continues, Orpheus removes the tourniquet to avoid falling, but a speeding car makes him turn around and lose Eurydice, sending him back to Earth. At his final showstopping performance, dedicated to Eurydice, he is murdered by Dominique Daniel, who was denied his concert tickets. Orpheus reunites with his wife in death.

== Cast ==
- Francis Huster as Orpheus
- Laurent Malet as Calaïs
- Keiko Itô as Eurydice
- Gérard Klein as Aristée
- Marie-France Pisier as Claude Perséphone
- Jean Marais as Hades
- Hugues Quester as Caron
- Éva Darlan as Dominique Daniel
- Annick Alane as Luciennne
- Marion Game as the costumer
- Jean Amos as Clément

== Production ==
The original title of the film was Monsieur Orphée.

Eurydice is played by a Japanese actress; Jacques Demy conceived of her relationship with Orpheus as a tribute to John Lennon and Yoko Ono. Eurydice is also a sculptor like Yoko Ono. Demy also wanted to highlight the singularity of the romance between Orpheus and Eurydice by choosing someone “rare” and “from elsewhere.”

The film experienced some budget problems, not having obtained the advance on receipts. The fame of Jacques Demy in Japan, and the fact that the main actress is Japanese, however, made it possible to pre-sell the film there.

Parking was an old project of Jacques Demy, who planned to film it with David Bowie. The latter not being available, Demy had vainly requested Johnny Hallyday to play the main role. After considering abandoning the project, Demy finally took it back, encouraged by a producer, who suggested hiring Francis Huster to play the role of Orpheus. Huster nevertheless insisted on performing the songs himself, and the producer included this clause in the actor's contract without conferring with Demy, who according to Michel Legrand accepted the clause under penalty of the film not being made. Legrand had first made recordings with Daniel Lévifor songs.

== Reception ==
The film, shot on short notice to be, according to the producer's wishes, ready for the 1985 Cannes Film Festival, was ultimately not finished on time.

Parking was a commercial failure, with the public particularly having difficulty accepting Francis Huster in the role of a pop singer filling enthusiastic venues.

Jacques Demy disowned the film as “a catastrophe”; depressed by this experience, the director thought at the time of quitting the film industry. Francis Huster said in 2010 about his interpretation of the songs: “That's a blast. […] It’s a job to be a singer and it’s not mine."
