= Breathless (British TV series) =

- Genre: Period drama
- Created by: Paul Unwin; Peter Grimsdale
- Written by: Simon Tywell
- Directed by: Paul Unwin; Marek Losey; Philippa Langdale
- Starring: Jack Davenport; Catherine Steadman; Zoe Boyle; Shaun Dingwall; Oliver Chris; Joanna Page; Natasha Little
- Composer: Anne Dudley
- Country of origin: United Kingdom
- Original language: English
- No. of series: 1
- No. of episodes: 6

Production
- Executive producer: Kate Bartlett
- Producer: Jolyon Symonds
- Cinematography: Tim Palmer
- Running time: 44–50 minutes
- Production companies: ITV Studios; Masterpiece

Original release
- Network: ITV
- Release: 10 October – 14 November 2013

Breathless is a British television period drama originally broadcast on ITV. It was created by Paul Unwin and Peter Grimsdale and directed by Paul Unwin, Marek Losey and Philippa Langdale, it stars Jack Davenport and Catherine Steadman. The setting is early 1960s England. This show was produced by ITV Studios and Masterpiece. On 29 January 2014, it was confirmed that Breathless would not be returning for a second series.

== Summary ==
The plot concerns some of the hospital staff that secretly perform off-site abortions (illegal at the time), their lives, and the complications that ensue. However, various subplots quickly rise to the surface while at a third level, personal relationships explore the roles of each of the characters in the society and social mores within the context of tremendous changes occurring in Britain. The focus remains on London in 1961 and the emerging contrasts within society.
