= The Prude =

- Directed by: Jacques Doillon
- Written by: Jacques Doillon; Jean-Francois Goyet
- Starring: Michel Piccoli; Sabine Azéma; Sandrine Bonnaire; Laurent Malet
- Cinematography: William Lubtchansky
- Edited by: Marie Robert
- Music by: Léo Daniderff; Philippe Sarde
- Distributed by: MK2 Films
- Release date: 1986
- Running time: 86 minutes
- Countries: France; Belgium
- Language: French

The Prude (French: La Puritaine) is a 1986 French-Belgian drama film directed by Jacques Doillon. It was entered into the main competition at the 43rd Venice International Film Festival.

== Cast ==
- Michel Piccoli as Pierre
- Sabine Azéma as Ariane
- Sandrine Bonnaire as Manon
- Laurent Malet as François
- Brigitte Coscas as Waist of Manon
- Anne Coesens as Voice of Manon
- Corinne Dacla as Ear of Manon
- Jessica Forde as Hand of Manon
