= The Romantic Englishwoman =

1975 film directed by Joseph Losey

- Original film poster
- Directed by: Joseph Losey
- Written by: Tom Stoppard; Thomas Wiseman
- Based on: The Romantic Englishwoman (1971 novel) by Thomas Wiseman
- Produced by: Daniel M. Angel
- Starring: Michael Caine; Glenda Jackson; Helmut Berger
- Cinematography: Gerry Fisher
- Edited by: Reginald Beck
- Music by: Richard Hartley
- Production companies: Dial Films; Les Productions Meric-Matalon
- Distributed by: Fox-Rank (UK); Les Films Hermes (France)
- Release dates: 19 May 1975 (Cannes); 11 June 1975 (France); 16 October 1975 (London)
- Running time: 115 minutes
- Country: United Kingdom; France
- Language: English
- Budget: £784,476
- Box office: £844,198

The Romantic Englishwoman (French: Une Anglaise romantique, lit. 'A Romantic Englishwoman') is a 1975 crime drama film directed by Joseph Losey and starring Michael Caine, Glenda Jackson, Helmut Berger, Michael Lonsdale, and Kate Nelligan in her feature-length screen debut. The screenplay was written by Tom Stoppard and Thomas Wiseman, based on the latter's 1971 novel.

Caine plays a successful English novelist whose discontented wife, played by Jackson, decides to take a holiday to Germany in order to "find herself". There she meets a mysterious young man, played by Berger, in an elevator, which initiates an often bizarre, but extremely mature examination of desire, responsibility and the nature of love.

A British and French co-production, the film was shown at the 1975 Cannes Film Festival, but not entered into the main competition. It received generally positive reviews from critics.

== Plot ==
Elizabeth, bored wife of successful English pulp writer Lewis Fielding, leaves husband and child and runs away to the German spa town of Baden-Baden. There she meets a man named Thomas, who claims to be a poet but whom viewers know to be a petty thief, conman, drug courier, and gigolo. Though the two are briefly attracted to each other, she returns home. He, hunted by gangsters for a drug consignment he has lost, follows her to England.

Lewis, highly suspicious of his wife, invites the young man to stay with them and act as his secretary. Initially resenting the presence of the handsome stranger, Elizabeth one night starts an affair and, after being caught together in the conservatory by Lewis, the two run away with no money to the south of France. Lewis follows them, he in turn being followed by the gangsters looking for Thomas.

At the end the gangsters reclaim Thomas, presumably for execution, while Lewis reclaims Elizabeth.

== Cast ==
- Glenda Jackson as Elizabeth Fielding
- Michael Caine as Lewis Fielding
- Helmut Berger as Thomas
- Michael Lonsdale as Swan
- Béatrice Romand as Catherine
- Kate Nelligan as Isabel
- Nathalie Delon as Miranda
- Reinhard Kolldehoff as Herman
- Phil Brown as Mr. Wilson
- Marcella Markham as Mrs. Wilson
- Bill Wallis as Hendrik
- David de Keyser as George
- Anna Steele as Annie
- Marcus Richardson as David
- Julie Peasgood as New nanny
- Tom Chatto as Neighbour
- Frances Tomelty as Airport shop assistant
- Doris Nolan as Mealticket lady

== Production ==
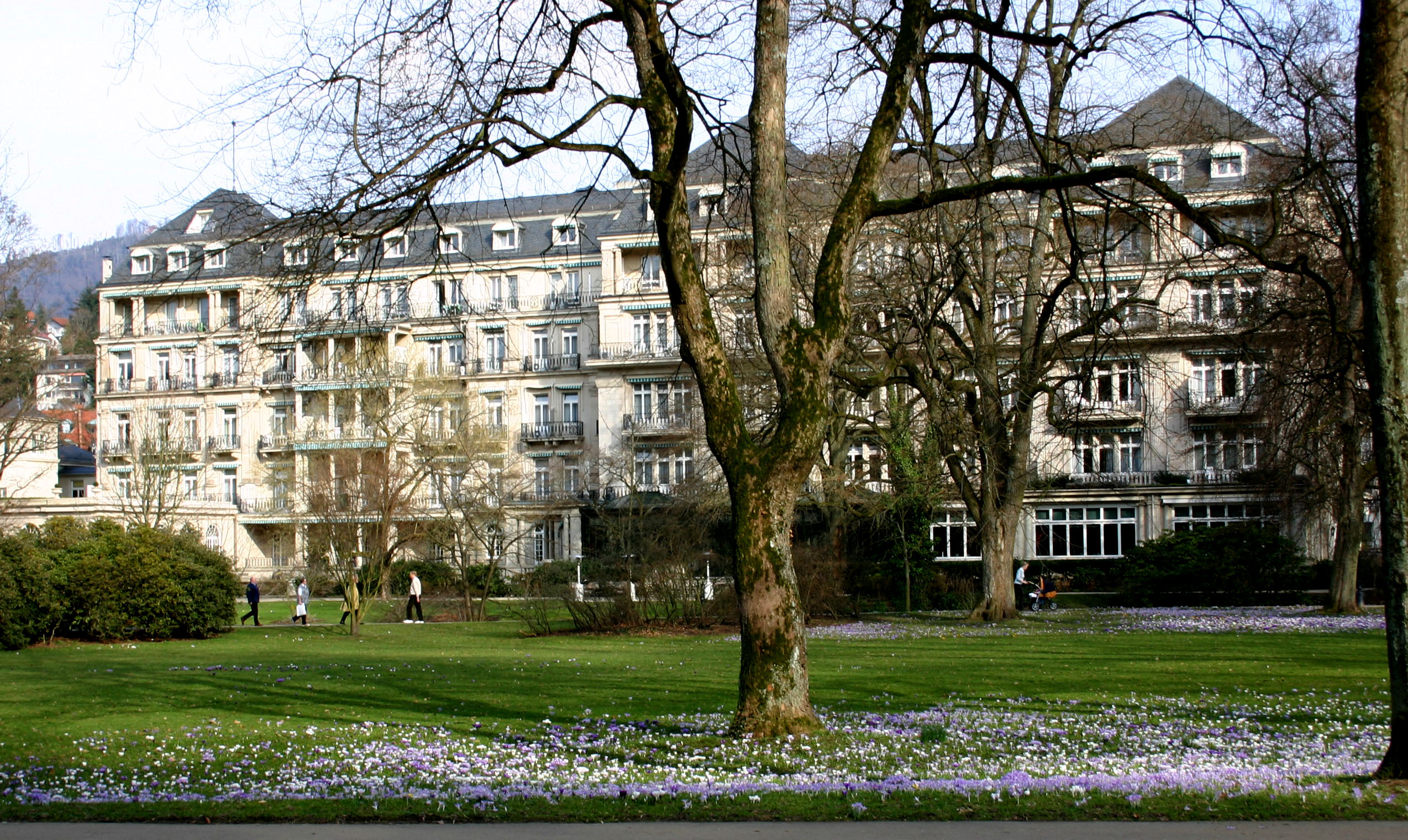
Brenners Park-Hotel in Baden-Baden.

The film was shot in London, Baden-Baden, and on the Côte d'Azur. Production costs were estimated at US$1.2 million. Finance came partly from Rank.

Losey again collaborated with cinematographer Gerry Fisher, with whom he had shot a total of seven films. Reginald Beck had been involved as editor on all of Losey's films since 1966. For Richard Hartley, this was the first film for which he wrote the score.

Losey regular Dirk Bogarde declined the role of Lewis.

Helmut Berger wore suits from Yves Saint-Laurent.

== Release ==
The film premiered out of competition at the Cannes Film Festival on 19 May 1975 and was released in France on 11 June of the same year. It opened at the Plaza 1 in London on 16 October 1975. Its TV premiere in West Germany was on 14 November 1976.

In the United States, the film was distributed by Roger Corman's New World Pictures.

=== Home media ===
The Romantic Englishwoman was released on DVD and Blu-ray in North America by Kino Lorber on June 21, 2011.

In 2021, the Pidax label released a DVD in German and English as part of its Film Classics series. "The Cocaine Trap" was chosen as the alternative title.

== Reception ==
On the review aggregator website Rotten Tomatoes, the film holds an approval rating of 80% based on 5 reviews, with an average rating of 6/10. AllMovie gave the film 3.5 stars out of 5.
