= Steaming (film) =

- US theatrical poster
- Directed by: Joseph Losey
- Screenplay by: Patricia Losey
- Based on: Steaming (1981 play) by Nell Dunn
- Produced by: Paul Mills
- Starring: Vanessa Redgrave; Sarah Miles; Diana Dors
- Cinematography: Christopher Challis
- Edited by: Reginald Beck
- Music by: Richard Harvey
- Production company: World Film Services
- Distributed by: Columbia–EMI–Warner Distributors
- Release date: 31 May 1985
- Running time: 95 minutes
- Country: United Kingdom
- Language: English
- Budget: £1,417,000

Steaming is a 1985 British comedy drama film directed by Joseph Losey, adapted by his wife Patricia from Nell Dunn's 1981 play, and starring Vanessa Redgrave, Sarah Miles and Diana Dors in the principal roles. The film is about a group of women who meet regularly in a Russian-style Steam bath and decide to fight its closure.

The film was Losey's final directorial work, released posthumously 11 months after his death. It was also Diane Dors' last film appearance, likewise posthumous. It was released in the United Kingdom on 31 May 1985.

== Plot summary ==
Three female frequenters of a steam room decide to fight its closure.

The film has no overall plot and is a series of conversations between the women involved. The unifying issue is the announcement that the baths were to be closed to build a leisure centre.

== Cast ==
- Vanessa Redgrave as Nancy
- Sarah Miles as Sarah
- Diana Dors as Violet
- Patti Love as Josie
- Brenda Bruce as Mrs. Meadows
- Felicity Dean as Dawn
- Sally Sagoe as Celia
- Anna Tzelniker as Mrs. Goldstein

== Production ==
The film was shot entirely at Pinewood Studios.

The title song was sung by Stephanie De Sykes, with music by Richard Harvey and lyrics by Robin Bextor.

== Release ==
Steaming premiered out of competition at the 1985 Cannes Film Festival, and was released in the United Kingdom on 31 May 1985. In the United States, the film was distributed by New World Pictures.

=== Home media ===
In 2016, the film was released on Blu-Ray by boutique label Scorpion Releasing.

== Reception ==
On the review aggregator website Rotten Tomatoes, 33% of 12 critics' reviews are positive.

A positive review in Mondo Digital called the film "an actors’ showcase with very little showy direction getting in the way, Steaming sticks closely to its stage origins with Losey largely focusing on creating a palpable atmosphere of damp air and soaked flesh, usually exposed in a refreshingly candid and non-judgmental fashion."
