= Marek Losey =

British film and television director (born 1971)

- Born: Marek Losey; 29 August 1971 (age 54); Paddington, London, England
- Occupations: Director; producer; screenwriter
- Years active: 2007–present
- Spouse: Sophie Losey (m. 1997)
- Children: 2
- Parents: Gavrik Losey; Sally Chesterton Losey

Marek Losey (born 29 August 1971 in St Mary's Hospital, Paddington, London) is a British film and television director; he is the third generation of filmmakers in the Losey family.

== Family history and personal life ==
Marek Losey is the grandson of American film director Joseph Losey and American fashion designer Elizabeth Hawes. He is the son of American film producer Gavrik Losey and the former British ballerina Sally Chesterton Losey, and the nephew of actor Joshua Losey. His older brother, Luke Losey, is also a film director. Marek Losey grew up in London, England, he attended Hallfield School in Bayswater. From the age of 12 he then attended boarding school at Dartington Hall School in Devon. Marek is married to producer Sophie Losey, together they have two children, Joachim and Eve Losey, they live in North London, England. Marek and Sophie's children also work in the film industry.

== Filmography ==
Year	Title	Notes
2006	Killing Me Softly	Short Film. Cinema and TV release 2 December 2006 UK.
2008	The Hide	Feature Film – Cinema release 5 June 2009 UK. Nominations and Awards. British Independent Film Awards: Best Achievement in Production, 2009 (UK). Evening Standard British Film Awards: Best Actor, 2010 (UK). Writers' Guild of Great Britain: Best First Feature-Length Film Screenplay, 2010 (UK). Syracuse Film Festival: Best actor, 2009 (USA). Syracuse Film Festival: Winner – Best cinematography, 2009 (USA). Monaco Film Festival: Best cinematography, 2009 (Monaco). Monaco Film Festival: Creative Achievement Award, 2009 (Monaco). Swale Film Festival: Winner – Best film, 2009 (UK). Marbella International Film Festival: Best actor: 2009 (Spain). Beaufort Film Festival: Winner – Best Film 2010 (USA). Official selection: Dinard Film Festival, 2008 (France). Sao Paulo Film Festival, 2009 (Brazil). International Filmfest Emden, 2009 (Germany). Marfici Film Festival, 2009 (Argentina).

Television

Year	Title	Notes
2011	DCI Banks "Cold Is The Grave"	Broadcast on ITV Network, 14 & 21 October 2011 UK
2012	13 Steps Down	Broadcast on ITV Network, 13 & 20 August 2012 UK
2012	The Poison Tree	Broadcast on ITV Network, 10 & 17 December 2012 UK
2013	Breathless	Episodes 3&4 directed by Losey broadcast on ITV Network, 24 & 31 October 2013 UK
2014	Vera "Changing Tides"	Broadcast on ITV Network, 5 April 2015 UK. Royal Television Award 2016 Winner – Best Drama (UK)
2014	Silent Witness "Squaring The Circle'	Broadcast on BBC1, 26 & 27 January 2015 UK
2015	Vera – "Dark Road"	Broadcast on ITV Network, 31 January 2016 UK. Royal Television Award 2017 Winner – Best Drama (UK)
2015	Beowulf "Return to the Shieldlands"	Episodes 11&12 directed by Losey broadcast on ITV Network, 13 & 20 March 2016 UK
2016	Brief Encounters	Episodes 3&4 directed by Losey broadcast on ITV Network, 18 & 25 July 2016 UK
2016	Stan Lee's Lucky Man	Season 2 – episode 1 "Luck Be a Lady" broadcast on Sky1, 24 February 2017 UK
2016	Stan Lee's Lucky Man	Season 2 – episode 2 "Playing With Fire" broadcast on Sky1, 4 March 2017 UK
2018	The 12 Neighs of Christmas	TV movie special of drama series Free Rein released on Netflix, 7 December 2018 USA
2018	Valentine's Day	TV movie special of drama series Free Rein released on Netflix, 1 February 2019 USA
2021	Silverpoint	Season 1 - episodes 5,6,7,8 Silverpoint release date March 2022, BBC and HULU
2022	A Kind of Spark	Season 1 - episodes 1,2,3,4,5 A Kind of Spark release date March 2023, BBC
2023	A Kind of Spark	Season 1 - episodes 1,2,3,4,5 A Kind of Spark release date 2024 TBC, BBC
