= Edith Reuss =

American clothing designer

Edith Marie Reuss (3 December 1911 – December 1982) was an American clothing designer of the early 20th century. She was among the first Americans to make an impact in international markets, helping to make New York City a center of fashion. She was a contemporary of Adele Simpson and Elizabeth Hawes In the early 1930s, Reuss was known for her prints' designs, which had been launched successfully.
