= Mansfield Markham =

British film producer and director (1905–1971)

- Born: 13 December 1905
- Died: 1971 (aged 65–66)
- Occupation: Film director
- Spouse: Beryl Markham (m. 1927; div. 1942)
- Children: 1
- Parent: Sir Arthur Markham, 1st Baronet

Mansfield Markham (13 December 1905 – 1971) was the second son of Sir Arthur Markham, Bt., and his wife, Lucy, Lady Markham. He became a British film producer and director.

== Early life ==
Markham was born into a wealthy and distinguished family of colliers and industrialists. They are particularly associated with Chesterfield, in Derbyshire.

Markham's grandfather was the eponymous co-owner of the well-known Markham Colliery, in Chesterfield. Markham's father served as the Member of Parliament, as a Liberal, for Mansfield in Nottinghamshire, another well-known mining area. The family also had business interests in the coal-fields of South Yorkshire and Wales. In 1911, the contribution of Markham's father to this key industry was recognised with a baronetcy, or hereditary knighthood. During the First World War, Sir Arthur campaigned vigorously for the welfare of young soldiers. Lady Markham also interested herself in good causes for the war-effort, and became a CBE, the grade below being made a Dame.

Markham's uncle, Charles, was the director of an engineering company, also based in Chesterfield, that made machinery for the mines: Markham & Co., amongst other business interests. Markham's aunt was Violet Markham, who used her privileged position to devote herself to educational causes around Chesterfield. Later, in 1927, she served her year as Mayor of Chesterfield. During the Great War, she turned her abilities to the training of women in war-service and, in 1917, was rewarded with the very high award of Companion of Honour, (CH).

In 1916, Markham's father died, comparatively early, and the title was inherited by Markham's elder brother, who became Sir Charles Markham.

== Marriage and Beryl Markham ==
In 1927, Markham married. His wife was a divorcee, a not-insignificant detail at the time, and was already a very well-known racehorse-trainer, both under her maiden name, as Miss Beryl Clutterbuck, and her previous married name, Mrs. Purves. The engagement had been announced on 27 August 1927, only five months after her engagement had been announced on 19 March 1927 in Kenya to Hon. Robert Fraser Watson, a younger son of the first Lord Manton, which change "produced a great deal of amused speculation within the (Kenya) Colony, whose chief occupation and innocent delight was social gossip. ...A generally held opinion was that Watson had a lucky escape". Mansfield Markham gave his wife the surname by which she is now best known to history, and the financial support to engage in the new occupation for which she is now probably best-known, thus helping to create the persona of the aviator, or aviatrix as was the style of the time: Beryl Markham. The couple had a son, Gervase Markham.

However, in 1928 and after the birth of the child Gervase in 1929, Mrs. Markham shocked her high society contemporaries by embarking on an affair with Prince Henry, Duke of Gloucester, the third son of the reigning King-Emperor, George V. The affair continued, in England, into the following year and Markham decided to bring an action for divorce. He indicated he would name the Prince in the proceedings, at which point Queen Mary intervened to grant Beryl a small annual income, to help her to travel and so enable the affair to cool off. Prince Henry's solicitors paid out an annuity until her death in 1985.

After Beryl's successful Atlantic crossing, she began a new affair with Hubert Broad, and Markham filed for divorce. It was Broad who was named in the divorce proceedings. Beryl eventually returned to Africa and, in 1942, her book West with the Night was published.

The couple's son Gervase was brought up by Markham's mother, Lady Markham.

== Movies ==
Markham went into the movie business, and directed eight films in the early 1930s, including 1933's The Return of Raffles.

== Later life ==
After his mother's death in 1960, Markham took control of Commodore Shipping, a business which began in the late 1940s as an excursion operator in the South East of England, using former Royal Navy vessels.

== Selected filmography ==
- Madame Guillotine (1931)
- Baroud (1932)
- The Return of Raffles (1933)
- Maid Happy (1933)
