= Roads to the South =

- Directed by: Joseph Losey
- Written by: Jorge Semprún
- Starring: Yves Montand; Miou-Miou
- Cinematography: Gerry Fisher
- Edited by: Reginald Beck
- Music by: Michel Legrand
- Release date: 28 April 1978
- Running time: 103 minutes
- Countries: France; Spain
- Language: French

Roads to the South (French: Les Routes du Sud) is a 1978 Franco-Spanish film directed by Joseph Losey. It stars Yves Montand and Miou-Miou. The film is a sequel to The War is Over (1966), which was directed by Alain Resnais.

== Cast ==
- Yves Montand as Jean Larrea
- Miou-Miou as Julia
- Laurent Malet as Laurent Larrea
- France Lambiotte as Eva Larrea
- José Luis Gómez as Miguel
