= The Boy in the Oak =

2010 children's book by Jessica Albarn

- Cover of The Boy in the Oak, showing artwork by Jessica Albarn
- Author: Jessica Albarn
- Illustrator: Jessica Albarn
- Genre: Children's literature
- Publisher: Simply Read Books
- Publication date: 2010
- Publication place: Canada
- Media type: Print
- Pages: 40
- ISBN: 978-1-897476-52-9

The Boy in the Oak is a 2010 Canadian children's book written and illustrated by Jessica Albarn. It is a fantasy about a boy who discovers an oak tree in his family's back garden. The book contains detailed pencil drawings of fairies, insects, and children. It also contains translucent pages with close-up photographs of insects, tree bark, flowers, and other images from nature. Albarn showcased the book as part of the Port Eliot Festival in 2010.

== Plot ==
A boy who lived in a house with a garden did not appreciate nature; he trampled on flowers and carved his initials into trees. The fairies that lived in the forest decided to stop him from destroying everything by trapping him inside the large oak tree in the garden. His parent searched and searched, but eventually gave up on finding him and moved away. After several years, a new family moved into the house. They spoke of cutting down the oak tree, which angered the fairies. They choose to try to steal the little girl, but the boy forces her back through the portal between the fairy and human worlds. This kindness allows the boy to break the spell that trapped him.

== Development history ==
Albarn was inspired to begin this novel when a friend showed her a tree in her garden that appeared to have a face in the bark. The garden reminded Albarn of a cottage in the woods that she and her family would visit as a child.

== Film ==
The book was adapted into a short film, with a release date set to spring 2011 to select theaters in the United Kingdom. It was directed by Luke Losey, written by Glen Laker and produced by Alcove Entertainment. It is narrated by Jude Law. The film's score was composed by Jessica Albarn's brother Damon Albarn, who is known as the singer for Blur and frontman and songwriter for the Gorillaz. The film combines live action, animation, and illustration.
