= The Possessed (1988 film) =

1988 film

- French poster
- Directed by: Andrzej Wajda
- Written by: Jean-Claude Carrière
- Based on: The Possessed; 1871 novel by Fyodor Dostoevsky
- Produced by: Margaret Ménégoz
- Starring: Isabelle Huppert
- Cinematography: Witold Adamek
- Edited by: Halina Prugar-Ketling
- Music by: Zygmunt Konieczny
- Distributed by: Gaumont Distribution
- Release date: 24 February 1988
- Running time: 116 minutes
- Country: France
- Language: French
- Budget: $575.000

The Possessed (French: Les Possédés) is a 1988 French drama film directed by Andrzej Wajda and starring Isabelle Huppert. It was entered into the 38th Berlin International Film Festival.

== Plot ==
Based on the 1872 novel Demons by Fyodor Dostoevsky, the story is set in 19th-century Russia, in a small provincial town plagued by political unrest and social upheaval. The town's inhabitants are divided into various factions, including radical intellectuals, aristocrats, government officials, and peasants, each with their own agendas and ideologies.

The central figure in the story is Nikolai Stavrogin, a mysterious and enigmatic aristocrat who returns to his hometown after an extended absence in Switzerland. Stavrogin's arrival sparks intrigue and controversy among the town's residents, as rumors circulate about his scandalous past and his involvement in a tragic incident years earlier.

Stavrogin's presence disrupts the lives of those around him, including the governor's wife, Varvara Stavrogina, and her stepson, Pyotr Verkhovensky, a charismatic and radical revolutionary. Verkhovensky is a fervent advocate for social change and seeks to incite a revolution against the existing order.

As tensions escalate within the community, fueled by Stavrogin's provocative actions and Verkhovensky's radical ideology, the characters find themselves drawn into a web of intrigue, manipulation, and moral corruption. Verkhovensky forms a secret society of radicals, recruiting disaffected youths and intellectuals to his cause.

Meanwhile, Stavrogin becomes entangled in a series of scandalous affairs and personal conflicts, including a tumultuous relationship with a young woman named Marya Lebyadkina, who becomes infatuated with him. Stavrogin's ambiguous motives and erratic behavior confound those around him, leading to speculation and suspicion about his true intentions.

As the tensions between the various factions reach a boiling point, the town erupts into violence and chaos. Verkhovensky's revolutionary ambitions spiral out of control, leading to betrayal, bloodshed, and ultimately tragedy for many of the characters involved.

== Cast ==
- Isabelle Huppert as Maria Sjatov
- Jutta Lampe as Maria Lebjadkin
- Philippine Leroy-Beaulieu as Lisa
- Bernard Blier as Le Gouverneur
- Jean-Philippe Écoffey as Peter Verchovenskij
- Laurent Malet as Kirillov
- Jerzy Radziwiłowicz as Sjatov
- Omar Sharif as Stepan
- Lambert Wilson as Nikolaj Stavrogin
- Philippe Chambon as Chigalev
- Jean-Quentin Châtelain as Virguinski
- Rémi Martin as Erkel
- Serge Spira as Fedka
- Wladimir Yordanoff as Lebjadkin
- Zbigniew Zamachowski as Liamchine
- Piotr Machalica as Maurice
- Bożena Dykiel as Virginska
- Krzysztof Kumor as Aide de campe
- Witold Skaruch as Secrétaire du Gouverneur
- Tadeusz Łomnicki as Captaine
- Agnieszka Jaworska as Kirillov's child

== See also ==
- Isabelle Huppert on screen and stage
