= Elizabeth Hawes =

American fashion designer (1903–1971)

- Photograph by Ralph Steiner, 1938
- Born: December 16, 1903; Ridgewood, New Jersey, U.S.
- Died: September 6, 1971 (aged 67); New York City, New York, U.S.
- Education: Vassar College, Poughkeepsie, New York (1921–25)
- Labels: Hawes-Harden (1928–30); Hawes Inc. (1930–40); Elizabeth Hawes Inc., New York (1948–49)
- Spouse(s): Ralph Jester (m. 1930; div. 1935) Joseph Losey (m. 1937; div. 1944)
- Children: Gavrik Losey
- Relatives: Luke Losey (grandson); Marek Losey (grandson)

Elizabeth Hawes (December 16, 1903 – September 6, 1971) was an American clothing designer, outspoken critic of the fashion industry, and champion of ready to wear and people's right to have the clothes they desired, rather than the clothes dictated to be fashionable, an idea encapsulated in her book Fashion Is Spinach, published in 1938. She was among the first American apparel designers to establish their reputations outside of Paris haute couture. In addition to her work in the fashion industry as a sketcher, copyist, stylist, and journalist, and designer, she was an author, union organizer, champion of gender equality, and political activist.

== Early life ==
Elizabeth Hawes was born in Ridgewood, New Jersey, the second child of four. Her father was an assistant manager for the Southern Pacific Company, and her mother worked on the Board of Education and was actively involved in local politics, especially the rights of the local African-American community. She had graduated from Vassar in 1925 and headed the Federal Emergency Relief Administration for Bergen County, New Jersey, from 1932 to 1936. The family lived an average middle-class existence in a shingle house in a commuter town about twenty-five miles from New York City.

Hawes' mother was an early advocate of Montessori education, and taught her children various handicrafts, such as raffia basket-weaving and beadwork. At the age of 10, Hawes also made clothes and hats for her dolls, before beginning to sew her own clothes. When she was 12 years old, she began dressmaking professionally by making clothes for the young children of her mother's friends. She also sold a few children's dresses to a shop called The Greenaway Shop in Haverford, Pennsylvania. This brief, precocious career ceased when she went to high school and while she continued making her own clothes, she ceased to make them for others. She attended Ridgewood High School and had originally planned to attend art school.

== Education ==
Like her mother and elder sister Charlotte, she attended Vassar. She was very intelligent and a good student, passing her comprehensives without difficulty. During her freshman year, she assisted the costume designer for the annual outdoor play. She found she was good at the compulsory courses, such as mathematics and chemistry, getting A grades, but was bored by the literature and art courses she chose to take, only earning B's. She chose to focus on economics, eventually working up to advanced Economic Theory. Her thesis, based upon the words of Ramsay MacDonald, gained her an A.

In her free time, Hawes focused on clothing. In 1923, at the end of her sophomore year, she went on a six-week course at Parson's School of Fine and Applied Arts, where she decided no art school could teach her how to design clothes. While the students did life drawing, Hawes was exasperated that nobody mentioned anatomy to her, which she felt was necessary if she wanted to dress "living human beings who had bones and muscles". She decided she needed more useful experience, so, during the 1924 summer break, she secured an unpaid apprenticeship in the Bergdorf Goodman workrooms, to learn how expensive clothes were made to order. Before she left to return to college, the French imports came into the store, and she decided she wanted to travel to France to find out what fashion was all about.

Hawes only had $25 a month for all her expenses, including clothing, so raising the funds for her proposed trip posed a problem. First, she tried to graduate six months early in the year of 1924–25 as she had enough credits. However, as the Dean of the college had decided that no diplomas could be given out before the end of four full years, Hawes was unable to leave early. Eventually, she resumed dressmaking, designing clothes for her classmates, and selling her designs through a dress shop on the edge of the campus. She earned a few hundred dollars through commissions from the shop. She also advertised her services in the Vassar paper.

Despite a brief crisis where Hawes wondered if she should be devoting her life to humanitarian work, she was advised by her economics teacher to take advantage of her clothing-focused gifts and desires. She graduated in the spring of 1925, and prepared to set sail for Paris that July. As her mother was a prominent local citizen, the Newark News decided to interview Elizabeth before she left. This interview, when published, led to a woman from the advertising department for a department store in Wilkes-Barre, Pennsylvania, offering Hawes $15 a month to report back fashion news from Paris for their advertising copy. Inspired by this, Hawes asked her local newspaper if they wanted a regular report from Paris. They accepted this offer, and offered her $10 a month to do so.

She graduated from Vassar in 1925.

On July 8, 1925, Elizabeth Hawes and a friend, Evelyn Johnson (whose mother had married a French perfume importer), sailed for France on the RMS Berengaria, student third-class.

== Fashion career in Paris (1925–1928) ==
Hawes and Johnson arrived at Cherbourg on July 14, 1925, and moved into a pension in Paris. Johnson's mother arranged for Hawes to work at her dressmaker's on the Faubourg St Honoré, a shop where high quality, illegal copies of haute couture dresses by the leading couturiers were manufactured and sold. It boasted that it never copied a couture dress without actually having had the original in hand. There Hawes sold clothing to non-French-speaking Americans and tried to secure new customers. The house closed every July and August to enable legitimate couturiers such as Coco Chanel and Madeleine Vionnet to produce their collections. Hawes sometimes visited a couture salon as a legitimate customer and purchased a dress to be copied. At the Ritz, Hawes saw her employers' counterfeit Chanel worn alongside the genuine ones. (Note: The copy house bought fabrics from the same suppliers as the legitimate couture houses and had contacts in the couture embroidery firms to provide access to embroidery samples. Sometimes legitimate couture clients would bring in new dresses they had just purchased so that they could fill in their wardrobe with accurate copies at a substantially lower price. Sometimes the copy house would intercept parcels of couture dresses being sent to overseas buyers, copy the dresses accurately, and then re-package the parcels to send them on their legitimate route. Patterns would also be stolen by workers in the couture houses, and sold to copy houses. By September 1, the copy house would offer 50 or 60 dresses made in the exact materials, color and style as the originals.)

In January 1926, Hawes became a sketcher for a New York manufacturer of mass-produced clothing. She would memorize the dresses during fashion shows and sketch afterwards. By the summer of 1926, Hawes grew too guilty about stealing designs to continue. She became a full-time fashion correspondent for the Cosmos Newspaper Syndicate, contributing to a regular article that appeared in the New York Post, Detroit Free Press, The Baltimore Sun, and other newspapers. This led to a regular column for the New Yorker under the pen name "Parisite", which ran for three years. She worked as a fashion buyer for Macy's, and then as a stylist in Lord and Taylor's Paris offices. In April 1928, Main Bocher, editor of Paris Vogue, offered her a job, but when she explained her ambition was to design he secured her a job with Nicole Groult, the sister of Paul Poiret. In this position, Hawes was permitted to develop her own designs, as well as work alongside Groult and her assistant designer. Working alongside these experienced designers, Hawes developed her method of designing based upon Vionnet's technique of draping on a wooden mannequin.

== Fashion career in America (1928–1940) ==
Hawes returned to New York in 1928. She hoped to fill a niche in the American market, where only Jessie Franklin Turner designed and made gowns to order, and the other competition was made to order or ready-to-wear copies of French fashion. In October, Hawes joined up with Rosemary Harden, the cousin of a friend, to open Hawes-Harden, a shop on the fourth floor of 8 West 56th Street, New York. The duo presented their first collection on December 16, 1928, Hawes' 25th birthday. Hawes-Harden sold its own designs only and made clothes to order using quality materials, well-sewn and well-fitted. Hawes-Harden gradually attracted a clientele that appreciated "original without being eccentric" designs. One of the first notable clients was Lynn Fontanne, who became a regular customer for Hawes' designs, and who wore the first stage costumes that Hawes made.

In 1930, Harden sold her share of the company to Hawes. Hawes used advertising and publicity and was very cautious with expenses to enable her business to survive the Great Depression. She also sold small decorative works designed for her by Alexander Calder and Isamu Noguchi, friends from her years in Paris. On July 4, 1931, Hawes presented her collection in Paris. It was the first time that a non-French design house had shown its collection during the Paris season, which won Hawes a great deal of media attention.

On April 13, 1932, Hawes, along with Annette Simpson and Edith Reuss, was featured in a show of American fashion designers at Lord & Taylor. The three women were credited with working towards creating an American style. A second show featured Hawes alongside Clare Potter and Muriel King. These innovative promotions led to a flood of newspaper and magazine articles on American fashion designers. Hawes generated publicity with humorous political names for her collections, including "The Five-Year Plan" (a cotton nightgown and bed jacket), "The Yellow Peril" (a silk afternoon dress), and "Disarmament" (an embroidered evening dress). The overall style was bold: "wide stripes and large prints were used in simple, comfortable silhouettes", by one account. She advocated trousers for women and followed her own advice.

In 1933, Hawes hired herself to a dress manufacturer to design ready-made clothes. She aimed to create moderately-priced designs that brought high fashion design to the ready-to-wear customer. The venture was commercially successful, but Hawes discovered that her designs were being made from inferior materials, and she severed the business connection.

One of Hawes' most successful designs was a glove design called "Guardsman". It was a colored suede glove first designed in 1931 that buttoned on the back of the wrist. Hawes sold a handmade pair of the suede "Guardsman" gloves for $12.50. In April 1935, after she had discontinued the couture version, a red suede copy of the glove was featured in a Lucky Strike advertisement. This she manufactured and sold successfully in a ready-to-wear version, the "Lucky Strike glove".

In 1935, she showed her designs in Moscow, the first display of haute couture there since the Russian Revolution of 1917. She said that the interest of large crowds of women showed that the country was becoming stable and that people were free to express counter-revolutionary ideas without punishment. She reported seeing permanent waves and painted nails and hats, mostly berets, and dispensed fashion advice:

I told them that they should not attempt to copy the fashions of any other land. They are big women, strongly built., and they should have their own styles. They are beginning to develop their own mode of dress best suited to themselves. As far as that is concerned, I believe it is a mistake for any country to adopt the styles of another.

In 1936, she designed the costumes for two Broadway plays, Roy Hargrave's A Room in Red and White, and Triple-A Plowed Under, part of the WPA's Federal Theatre Project directed by Joseph Losey.

When Hawes had visited the Soviet Union in 1935, she either accompanied or was accompanied by Losey, who was studying the Russian stage. They married on July 24, 1937. They had a son, Gavrik Losey, in 1938.

In 1937, she presented an all-male fashion show of her own brightly colored designs, followed in 1939 by the publication of another fashion manifesto, Men Can Take It.

In 1938, Hawes published Fashion Is Spinach, an autobiographical critique and exposé of the fashion industry. The title came from a Carl Rose cartoon published in The New Yorker on December 8, 1928. At the same time as she attacked the pretense of fashion, she produced popular designs like a simple dress with a full wide skirt—one of her trademarks—worn by Joan Bennett in a Wrigley's chewing gum advertisement. Life magazine reported the commercial relationship by noting that "Elizabeth Hawes has always had, in addition to her talent for designing clothes, an equal talent for publicizing and promoting Elizabeth Hawes." The designer of the chewing gum dress, Life reported, "now sells her very expensive, made-to-order dresses from a gray stone house on East 67th Street, Manhattan."

== Fashion criticism ==
From a young age, Hawes described herself as having believed in the "French legend" that "All beautiful clothes are designed in the houses of the French couturiers and all women want them."

Her mother's wedding trousseau came from Paris, and her grandmother annually travelled to Paris, bringing dresses back for her grandchildren. When Hawes began designing and making her own clothes, she referred to Vogue and Harper's Bazaar. The prevalence of Paris and French fashion in these magazines reinforced the impression that only French fashion was worthy of attention. Hawes set out to challenge this, and to dispel the concept that American design was only for leisure-wear and sportswear.

In Fashion Is Spinach, according to one summary, she said that "Style ... changes only in accordance with a true change in public taste or need, whereas fashions change because the industry must meet payrolls, magazines must be published, and a myth must be perpetuated." Sometimes it is style's utilitarian nature, its close adaptation to the needs of the user, that she praises: "Style in 1937 may give you a functional house and functional clothes to wear in it. Style doesn't give a whoop whether your comfortable clothes are red or yellow or blue, or whether your bag matches your shoes. Style gives you shorts for tennis because they are practical. Style takes away the wasp-waisted corset when women get free and active." She noted how men by contrast were not subject to fashion:

It is the prerogative of the working man, the lower class guy, to wear no collar and no tie. He may go without a hat if he likes. He can wear loose, unpleated blue jeans. He can show his suspenders if he wants. He can go shirtless in the hot summer, the straps of his overalls barely covering his hairy chest.... He is not admitted to the best clubs, nor even allowed to ride up in the elevator of the Squibb Building without a coat.... But he has nothing to risk by being comfortable.

Hawes urged men and women to speak up for clothing that suited their lifestyles. For example, in 1938 she used men's suspenders to illustrate how the fashion industry forced substandard-quality but "fashionable" merchandise upon consumers. Hawes interviewed normal men and found they universally preferred wide elastic suspenders with button fastenings, but could only buy narrow suspenders that cut into their shoulders, with metal grips that tore their trousers. Hawes used this to illustrate her point that the fashion system worked against the customer, offering poorly made clothing not intended to last beyond a single season.

Hawes was an outspoken champion of dress reform. She encouraged women to wear trousers, and felt that men should feel free to wear robes, coloured clothing, and soft garments if they so wished. She preferred the concept of style to that of fashion, stating that style evolved naturally, whereas fashion was faddish and artificial. Hawes felt everyone had a right to good quality clothing in their personally favoured colours, styles and fabrics, rather than having to choose from the limited range of styles and colours offered by the fashion industry that season. While she made clothes to order, she believed that ready-to-wear was the only way ahead, and thought clothing retailers should each cater to one specific type of customer instead of all stocking the same styles. For her, the only useful purpose of fashion was to entertain, i.e., "to give a little additional gaiety to life".

Life magazine used the publication of Fashion Is Spinach to present its readers with a series of fashions photos so they could determine which deserved which of Hawes' two labels, fashion or style. The magazine quoted her:

Style gives the feeling of a certain period in history. Fashion is a parasite on style. He is the horrid little man who tells you last winter's coat may be in perfect condition but you can't wear it because it has a belt.

According to one fashion historian, Hawes's stylish writing made her "the Dorothy Parker of fashion criticism, with her snappy tone and tell-it-straight attitude", and suggests this was the true cause of her notoriety: "In reality, her clothes did not appear radical for their time; it was her outspoken philosophy that set her apart."

== Wartime ==
After publishing her attack on the fashion industry, Hawes closed her dress business and wrote columns for PM, a populist afternoon newspaper. The staff included Communist sympathizers (such as Leo Huberman, the labor news editor) as well as anti-Communist liberals. She wrote the "News for Living" column, which has been called "a cross between the traditional women's page of newspapers and the consumer activism of the Popular Front." The FBI placed Hawes and other PM contributors under surveillance.

As a leader of the Committee for the Care of Young Children in Wartime she campaigned for child daycare centers.

In 1942, Hawes designed a uniform for American Red Cross volunteers. The same year, she applied for a night job at an airplane factory to personally experience the life of women machine operators. She used her experiences as the basis for a 1943 book exposing the plight of American female laborers called Why Women Cry. She opposed the passage of an Equal Rights Amendment for women, fearing it would remove protective legislation. She called for a restructuring of home life to acknowledge that women were now expected to work outside the home while continuing their traditional roles as housewives. It was the only way the U.S. could avoid "the Hitlerian routine of children-kitchen-church for the next generation of Common American women and do away with economic slavery for their husbands." Still, she tried to keep her feminist rhetoric from being divisive: "Men must work along with us in the solution of our basic home problems, or there will, in the end, be no homes worth mentioning in the U.S.A." Betty Friedan thought that Why Women Cry could launch a revolution from the nation's kitchens.

Hawes and Losey divorced in November 1944.

In 1945, Hawes published an essay in Antioch Review titled "The Woman Problem". She called on American women to become "active citizens". She described how housework was taken for granted and no longer a matter of pride now that so many products once made in the home are bought in the store, to the point that:

It is belief practically everyone is now of the conscious or unconscious opinion that a simple housewife who contributes nothing much but children to the society in which she lives is a social parasite. The housewife wants praise and she can't get it by being a housewife, or a mother. So she has become rather slipshod at both jobs.

She called for an education campaign aimed at men, who needed to face competition from the female workforce she wanted to unleash. She cited group child care during the war as an example of what women could to lighten their own workloads. She challenged those who thought they were leaders on women's issues:

If, in order to get the housewives of this country to take a part in it, a few Do-gooders have to forget Dumbarton Oaks and the Atlantic Charter for a while, nothing will be lost in the long run. And if, in the process of arousing the housewives, a few homes are broken up, one can only say they couldn't have been very well stuck together at the start.

She considered working women as well, and their subsidiary role in unions. These women, she wrote, "aren't fooled by veiled male condescension", but needed to learn their way around the mechanics if union politics and win the respect of their male co-workers by slowly pressing their own issues. Yet she complained as well: "the women of this country with their tendency to keep quiet, to individualistic rather than group behavior on the one hand, and doing what some man says on the other, these women are a fine base for fascism."

When the war ended, Hawes worked for a time as a union organizer for the United Auto Workers focusing on women. In Hurry Up Please Its Time (1946), Hawes described her disillusionment with sexual and racial discrimination in the union movement. Impatient with political squabbling, she chose sides, writing, "If one believed in getting the union work done, one preferred the Communists to the Red-Baiters". But she preferred the practical communists who focused on real workforce problems to those who talked ideology and international issues.

== Later life ==
Hawes spent much of 1947 in Saint Croix, U.S. Virgin Islands and then relaunched her fashion house in New York in 1948, early in the McCarthy era, opening a shop on Madison Avenue. She later said that she responded to former clients who needed to replace items they had purchased from her before the war by retrieving the designs from the fashion collection of the Brooklyn Museum and reproducing them. The FBI contacted all her professional connections and informed them of her radical political activities and associations. As a result, she was shunned by industry professionals and her business venture failed. The business proved unsuccessful and she ended operations on August 1, 1949. In 1950 she moved to the U.S. Virgin Islands once more to escape the conservative political climate on the mainland United States. Hawes turned to work as a freelance designer and continued writing. Despite her harsh words about the fashion industry, she supported herself by working for Priscilla Kidder's fashion house Priscilla of Boston, an American bridal wear designer. For the rest of her life, in addition to her freelance work, she continued designing clothing for herself and her friends, specializing in hand-knitted separates.

In 1948 Hawes published Anything But Love: A Complete Digest of the Rules for Feminine Behavior from Birth to Death; Given out in Print, on Film, and Over the Air; Seen, Listened to Monthly by Some 340,000,000 American Women. This book referenced popular women's magazines such as Good Housekeeping, Glamour, and Ladies' Home Journal to compile a manual of tongue-in-cheek advice on how to be a good woman. Hawes aimed to expose the American media's efforts to brainwash the post-war woman back into her traditional pre-war role. She accused the American government of using undemocratic policies to lull the American people into a passive consumerist world based on the false promise of ever-increasing prosperity and conformity.

For a time in the early 1950s, she rented her home on Jane Street in Greenwich Village to J. Robert Oppenheimer.

She tried to relaunch her design work in California in 1954, again without success, though she found there one new designer whose work she enjoyed, Rudi Gernreich. She continued to live there until she relocated to New York a few years before her death.

When she published an update of her critique of the fashion industry in 1954, It's Still Spinach, The New York Times reviewer gently mocked its overdressed homespun advice in a 70-line poem:

She conjures up her fashion news
To teach, convert, and to amuse,
And this she does, with varied cracks,
Employing rapier and axe.
An Oracle, appointed by
Herself, she tells us how and why
We do, our very souls, lay bare
For all to see, by what we wear.

Her time in the Virgin Islands period provided the basis for another book, But Say It Politely, published in 1954, that discussed racial and cultural issues in the islands.

== Personal life ==
On December 12, 1930, she married a sculptor she first met in Paris, Ralph Jester. They separated in 1933 and divorced in 1935. She married Joseph Losey on July 24, 1937. They had a son, Gavrik Losey, in 1938, and divorced in 1944.

Hawes died on September 6, 1971, of cirrhosis of the liver at her home in the Hotel Chelsea in New York City.

== Exhibitions ==
- Two Modern Artists of Dress: Elizabeth Hawes and Rudi Gernreich, Fashion Institute of Technology, New York, 1967
- Retrospective at Brooklyn Museum, New York, 1985
- Elizabeth Hawes: Along Her Own Lines, The Museum at FIT, New York, 2023

== Writings ==
- Fashion Is Spinach (New York, 1938), German edition Zur Hoelle mit der Mode (Berlin, 2019)
- Men Can Take It (New York, 1939)
- Why Is a Dress? (New York, 1942)
- Good Grooming (Boston, 1942)
- Why Women Cry, or Wenches with Wrenches (New York, 1943)
- Hurry Up Please Its Time (New York, 1946)
- Anything But Love (New York, 1948)
- But Say It Politely (Boston, 1951)
- It's Still Spinach (Boston, 1954)
