= Losi (mythology) =

In the traditions of Samoa, Losi was a giant and a son of Tagaloa, who instructed him to go and catch fish for the gods. Losi obeyed, but played a trick on the gods by laying a fish at the door of each of them, causing them to slip and fall. Losi then stole a slip of taro plant and smuggled it back to earth, where it became a staple of Samoan diet.
