= Stephanie Losee =

Marketing leader and writer

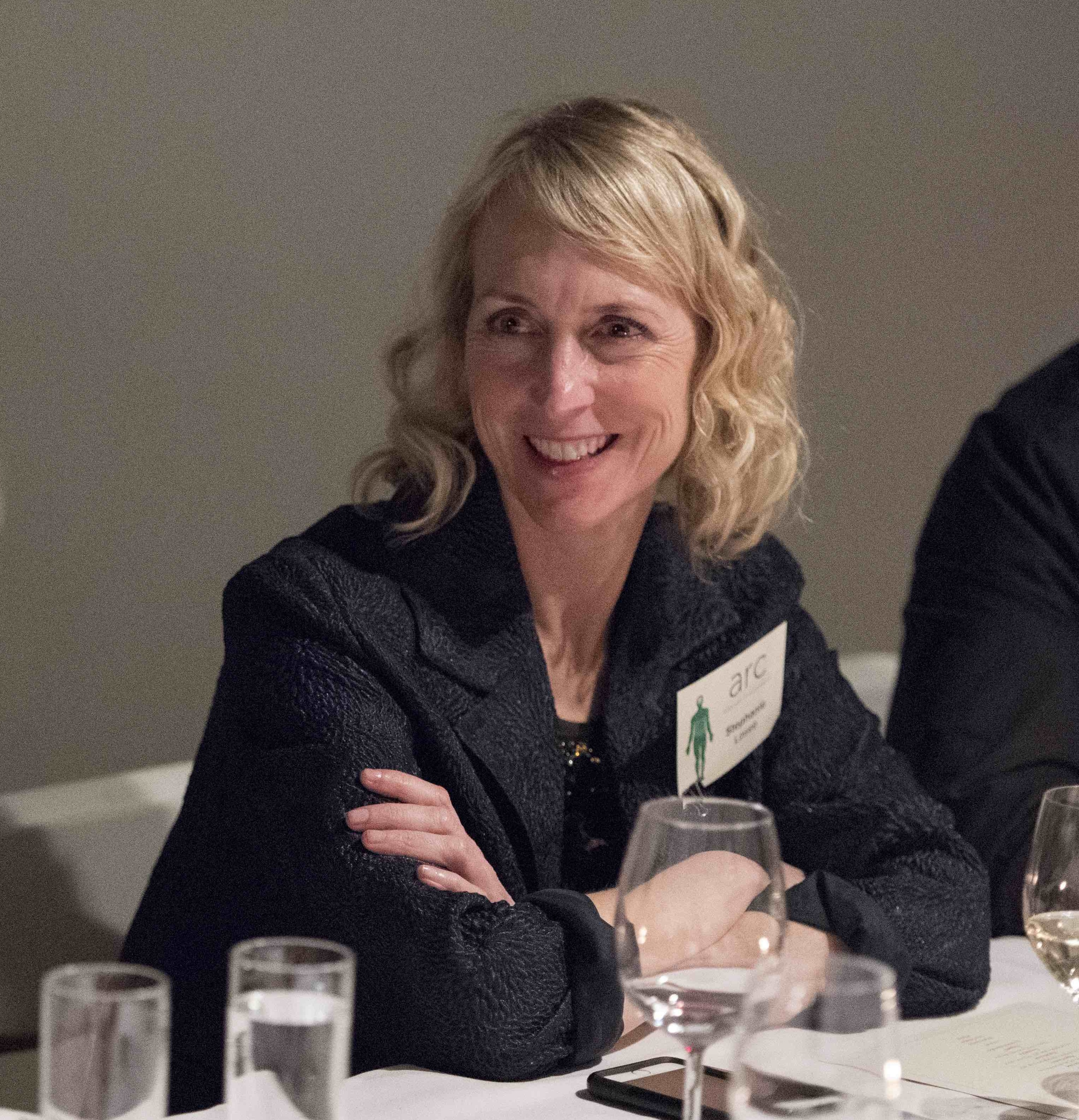
Stephanie Losee

Stephanie Losee (born in Cold Spring Harbor, New York) is one of a small group of former journalists who identified the implications of the disintermediation of media in the early 2000s and helped to create what is now known as content marketing.

Losee was one of the first Managing Editors of a Fortune 500 brand (Dell Technologies), leading the launch of Tech Page One, an early model for brand journalism channels that drove $1 billion annually in influenced pipeline. An early advocate for transparency and best practices in sponsored content (then called advertorial), she was tapped by Meredith Levien to partner with The New York Times on the 2014 launch of its native content platform, Paid Posts. She also consulted on the launch of T Brand Studio. Politico then hired her to launch its own content studio, Politico Focus. She subsequently held roles as Senior Director of Content at Visa, Head of Brand and Communications at Top 50 fintech Nova Credit, and Director of Industry & Portfolio Marketing Content at Autodesk, where she developed new content initiatives including the company's global, annual leader survey, State of Design & Make. She currently serves as Director, Executive Editor of Salesforce.

Her work has won numerous awards, including Content Studio of the Year and Best B2B Branded Content Site at Politico and Content Team of the Year at Autodesk. She was named a Top Marketing Speaker for her speeches at SXSW, Content Marketing World, and various conferences in Europe and Asia.

Losee co-wrote the nonfiction books Office Mate with Helaine Olen (Adams Media: 2007), which covered the rise in workplace relationships, and You've Only Got Three Seconds: How to Make the Right Impression in Your Business and Social Life with Camille Lavington (Doubleday: 1997).

Her works have appeared in five anthologies: The Maternal is Political, Cup of Comfort for Writers, Horse Crazy, Six-Word Memoirs on Love & Heartbreak, and It All Changed in an Instant: More Six-Word Memoirs by Writers Famous & Obscure. Her articles have appeared in O, The Oprah Magazine; Fortune; the Los Angeles Times; the San Francisco Chronicle Magazine; Child; The Huffington Post; San Francisco; and Salon, among others. She was a frequent commentator on KQED (TV), Northern California Public Radio and a "City Brights" columnist for the San Francisco Chronicle.

Stephanie Losee has appeared on CBS' The Early Show, CNN Headline News, Fox Business News, and NPR, as well as other television programs and radio shows across the country and in the UK, Europe and Asia. Her books have been translated into Danish, Korean and Russian. Losee has taught business writing courses to communications professionals in cities around the world and serves as a writing consultant for several Fortune 500 companies and startups.

From 1990 to 1998 she was a reporter and contributing writer at Fortune, where she covered the technology industry. She was a regular anchor for "The Fortune Business Report" on cable station NY1 News. Previously she was an editor at PC Magazine.

She graduated from Dartmouth College with an B.A. in English literature.

She has three daughters and lives in San Francisco.
