= West with the Night =

1942 memoir by Beryl Markham

- North Point Press, 1982
- Author: Beryl Markham
- Language: English
- Genre: Outdoor literature
- Publication date: 1942
- ISBN: 978-0-86547-118-4

West with the Night is a 1942 memoir by Beryl Markham, chronicling her experiences growing up in Kenya (then British East Africa) in the early 1900s, leading to celebrated careers as a racehorse trainer and bush pilot there. It is considered a classic of outdoor literature and was included in the United States' Armed Services Editions shortly after its publication. In 2004, National Geographic Adventure ranked it number 8 in its list of the 100 best adventure books.

Ernest Hemingway was deeply impressed with Markham's writing, saying

"she has written so well, and marvelously well, that I was completely ashamed of myself as a writer. I felt that I was simply a carpenter with words, picking up whatever was furnished on the job and nailing them together and sometimes making an okay pig pen. But [she] can write rings around all of us who consider ourselves as writers ... it really is a bloody wonderful book."

Markham was the first person to fly across the Atlantic Ocean from east to west in a non-stop solo flight (a westbound flight requires more endurance, fuel, and time than the eastward journey, because the craft must travel against the prevailing Atlantic winds). When Markham decided to take on the Atlantic crossing, no pilot had yet flown non-stop from Europe to New York, and no woman had completed the westward flight solo, though several had died trying. Markham hoped to claim both records.

On 4 September 1936, she took off from Abingdon, England. After a 20-hour flight, her Percival Vega Gull, VP-KCC named "The Messenger", suffered fuel starvation due to icing of the fuel tank vents, and she crash-landed at Baleine Cove on Cape Breton Island, Nova Scotia, Canada. She thereby became the first woman to cross the Atlantic east-to-west solo, and the first person to make it from England to North America non-stop from east to west. She was celebrated as an aviation pioneer.
