= Losie, West Virginia =

Extinct town in West Virginia, US

Coordinates: 38°40′41″N 81°02′09″W

Losie is an extinct town in Calhoun County, in the U.S. state of West Virginia.

== History ==
A post office called Losie was established in 1904, and remained in operation until 1951. The community was named after Losie Smith, the wife of an early settler.
