= Beryl Markham =

British writer, aviator, adventurer, racehorse trainer (1902–1986)

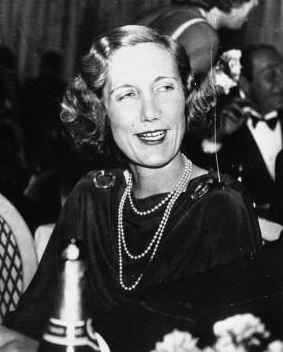
- Markham in 1936
- Born: Beryl Clutterbuck; 26 October 1902; Ashwell, Rutland, England
- Died: 3 August 1986 (aged 83); Nairobi, Kenya
- Occupations: Writer, pilot, horse trainer
- Spouses: Jock Purves (m. 1919, div, allegedly only 6 months) Mansfield Markham (m. 1927; div. 1942) Raoul Schumacher (m. 1942; div. 1960)
- Children: 1
- Writing career
- Notable work: West with the Night

Beryl Markham (born Clutterbuck; 26 October 1902 – 3 August 1986) was an English-born Kenyan aviator, adventurer, racehorse trainer and author. She was one of the first British bush pilots, and the first person to fly solo, non-stop across the Atlantic from Britain to North America. She wrote about her adventures in her memoir, West with the Night. She lived for many years in Kenya, where she died.

== Early years ==
Markham was born in the village of Ashwell, in the county of Rutland, England, the daughter of Charles Baldwin Clutterbuck, a horse trainer, and Clara Agnes (née Alexander) (1878–1952). She had an older brother, Richard Alexander "Dickie" Clutterbuck (1900–1927).

When she was four years old, she moved with her father to then colonial British East Africa, today's Kenya. He built a horse racing farm in Njoro, near the Great Rift Valley between the Mau Escarpment and the Rongai Valley. Markham spent an adventurous childhood learning, playing, and hunting with the local children of all races. On her family's farm, she developed her knowledge of and love for horses, establishing herself as a trainer at the age of 17, after her father left for Peru.

She befriended the Danish writer Karen Blixen during the years that Blixen was managing her family's coffee farm in the Ngong hills outside Nairobi. When Blixen's romantic connection with the hunter and pilot Denys Finch Hatton was winding down, Markham started her own affair with him. He invited her to tour game lands on what turned out to be his fatal flight, but Markham supposedly declined because of a premonition of her flight instructor, British pilot Tom Campbell Black.

Inspired and coached by Tom Campbell Black, Markham learned to fly. She worked for some time as a bush pilot, spotting game animals from the air and signalling their locations to safaris on the ground.

Markham was married three times, taking the name Markham from her second husband, the wealthy Mansfield Markham, with whom she had a son, Gervase.

In 1928, while pregnant with Gervase, she entered into an affair with Prince Henry, Duke of Gloucester – known informally as Harry – the son of George V, who became besotted with her during his trip to Kenya.

Returning to England, Harry installed Beryl as his mistress in the Grosvenor Hotel, a few minutes' walk from Buckingham Palace. George V attempted to end the affair by sending Harry on a royal visit to Japan, but the affair resumed on his return to England. Historian Jane Ridley notes that Beryl "was spotted running barefoot along the corridors of Buckingham Palace". Mansfield later threatened to divorce Beryl and cite Harry as a co-respondent. Though Mansfield and his brother Charles were vociferously warned against "citing a prince of the blood in a divorce petition" by Queen Mary, the Palace agreed to pay up in the face of the brothers’ blackmail attempts. £15,000 was placed in a trust fund, providing Beryl with an annuity of £500 (around £32,000 in 2021).

Beryl also had an affair with Hubert Broad, who was later named by Mansfield Markham as a co-respondent in his 1937 divorce from Markham. After her Atlantic crossing, she returned to be with Broad, who was also an influence in her flying career.

== Record flight ==
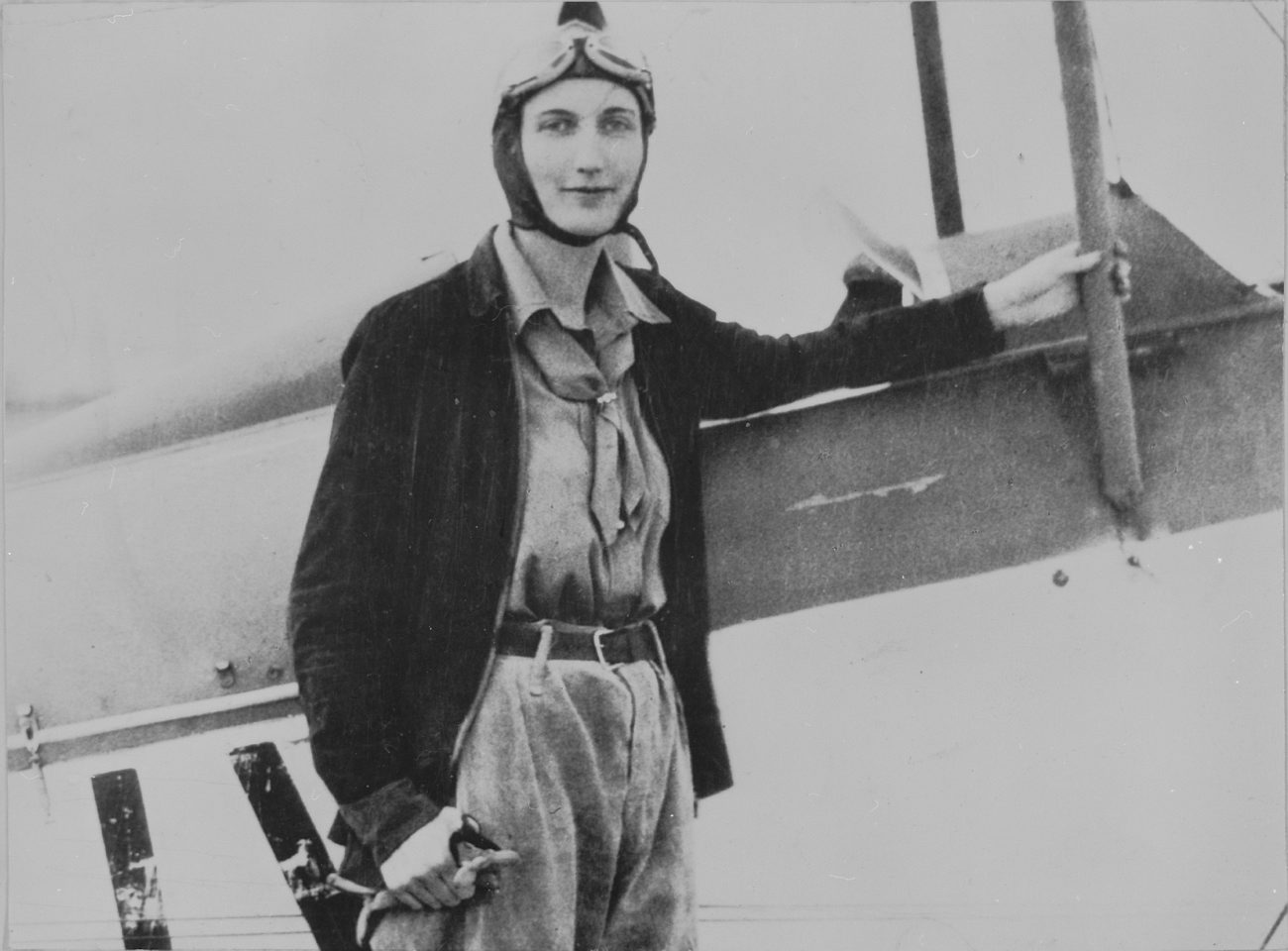
Beryl Markham, c. 1930

In 1936 Markham made a solo flight across the Atlantic from England to North America. On 4 September 1936 she took off from Abingdon in southern England; her intended destination was Floyd Bennett Field in Brooklyn, New York, but after a 20-hour flight her Percival Vega Gull VP-KCC named The Messenger, suffered fuel starvation due to icing of the fuel tank vents, and she made a forced landing at Baleine Cove on Cape Breton Island, Nova Scotia, Canada, making Markham the first woman to fly solo from England to North America from east to west, but she was not the first to cross the Atlantic in that direction, as the Junkers Bremen had been flown by Captain Hermann Köhl with two others in 1928.

Markham chronicled many of her adventures in her memoir West with the Night, published in 1942. Despite strong reviews in the press, the book sold modestly, and then quickly went out of print. After living for many years in the United States, Markham moved back to Kenya in 1952.

== Rediscovery ==
Markham's memoir lingered in obscurity until 1982, when Sonoma, California restaurateur George Gutekunst read a collection of Ernest Hemingway's letters, including one in which Hemingway praised Markham's writing:

Did you read Beryl Markham's book, West with the Night? ... She has written so well, and marvelously well, that I was completely ashamed of myself as a writer. I felt that I was simply a carpenter with words, picking up whatever was furnished on the job and nailing them together and sometimes making an okay pig pen. But this girl, who is to my knowledge very unpleasant and we might even say a high-grade bitch, can write rings around all of us who consider ourselves as writers ... it really is a bloody wonderful book.

Intrigued, Gutekunst read West with the Night and became so enamoured of Markham's prose that he helped persuade a California publisher, North Point Press, to re-issue the book in 1983. The re-release of the book led to praise for the 80-year-old Markham as a great author as well as flyer.

When found in Kenya by Associated Press East Africa correspondent Barry Shlachter, Markham was living in poverty. She had recently been badly beaten during a burglary at her house near the Nairobi racetrack, where she still trained thoroughbreds. The success of the re-issue of West with the Night provided enough income for Markham to finish her life in relative comfort. Earlier, she had been supported by a circle of friends and owners of race horses she trained into her 80s. The book became a best-seller, spurred by the 1986 broadcast of a public television documentary about Markham's life, World Without Walls: Beryl Markham's African Memoir, produced by George Gutekunst, Barry Shlachter, Joan Saffa, Stephen Talbot and Judy Flannery in collaboration with KQED-TV in San Francisco. Gutekunst and Shlachter had approached the station to co-operate on the documentary, directed by Andrew Maxwell-Hyslop. Actor Lyle Talbot narrated the film, British actress Diana Quick was the voice of Markham in readings from her memoir, and Shlachter conducted most of the interviews. CNN Africa correspondent Gary Streiker did the filming for the well-reviewed, award-winning PBS program.

Markham died in Nairobi in 1986. Her short stories were posthumously collected in The Splendid Outcast, with an introduction by Mary S. Lovell. A tale from West with the Night was excerpted and illustrated by Don Brown as a children's book, The Good Lion. In 1988, CBS aired the biographical miniseries, Beryl Markham: A Shadow on the Sun, with Stefanie Powers in the title role.

Both West with the Night and Splendid Outcast appeared on the New York Times best-seller list of hardcover fiction.

== Authorship controversy ==
Critics raised questions as to whether Markham was the true, or sole author of West with the Night, when her third husband Raoul C. Schumacher made claims to the book. Evidence abounds that she was indeed the sole author; copies of the manuscripts sent to her editor prior to Markham meeting her ex-husband quickly silenced the critics and his claims. Schumacher was lodging with Hollywood writer Allen Vincent in California according to the 1940 census and Markham re-entered the United States via Florida in 1941. It is unlikely that Schumacher would have had time to process such a detailed biography in such a short time, but may have suggested it might make a Hollywood film to encourage Markham to marry him.

Author Mary S. Lovell visited Markham in Nairobi shortly before Markham's death and interviewed her extensively in preparation for her biography Straight on Till Morning (1987). From her research, Lovell concluded that Markham was the sole author, although Schumacher made some basic edits to the manuscript. Instead, Lovell suggests Antoine de Saint-Exupéry, another of Markham's lovers, may have served as inspiration for Markham's clear, elegant language and storytelling style.

== In popular culture ==
- In the film adaptation of Blixen's memoir, Out of Africa (1985), Markham is represented as an outspoken, horse-riding tomboy named Felicity (played by Suzanna Hamilton).
- In 1986, a United States public television documentary about Markham's life, World Without Walls: Beryl Markham's African Memoir, was produced by Gutekunst, Shlachter, Joan Saffa, Stephen Talbot and Judy Flannery in collaboration with KQED-TV.
- Stefanie Powers portrayed her in a made-for-TV film called Beryl Markham: A Shadow on the Sun in 1988.
- In the ITV TV series, Heat of the Sun (1998), set in 1930s Kenya, the character of Emma Fitzgerald, an independent aviator played by Susannah Harker, appears to be modelled after Markham.
- A novel written by Paula McLain about Markham's life, Circling the Sun, was released in 2015.
- Markham was represented as an aviation pioneer in the TV episode "Written Like a Merriwick" from the Hallmark Channel TV series Good Witch (2015).

== Legacy and honours ==
The International Astronomical Union has named the impact crater Markham, on the planet Venus, after her.

== See also ==
- Bror von Blixen-Finecke
- Denys Finch Hatton

== Bibliography ==
- Markham, Beryl. West with the Night. San Francisco: North Point Press, 1983 [1942]. ISBN 0-86547-118-5.
- Lovell, Mary S. Straight on Till Morning: The Biography of Beryl Markham New York: St Martins Press, 1987. ISBN 0-312-01096-6
- Shlachter, Barry, "A Life of Adventure Rediscovered: Beryl Markham's 1942 Book, Lauded by Hemingway, Reprinted," The Associated Press, carried by "International Herald Tribune," Paris, 16 June 1983.
- Trzebinski, Errol. The Lives of Beryl Markham. New York: W.W. Norton. 1993. ISBN 0-393-03556-5.
- Wheeler, Sara. Too Close to the Sun: The Audacious Life and Times of Denys Finch Hatton. New York: Random House. 2006. ISBN 978-1-4000-6069-6.
