= Gavrik Losey =

American film producer

Gavrik Losey (born 1938) is an American-born participant in various aspects of filmmaking including producer and production manager. Gavrik was born in New York, the son of film director Joseph Losey and fashion designer Elizabeth Hawes. He attended the Little Red School House in Manhattan, Poughkeepsie Day School in Poughkeepsie, and high school in New Jersey. After graduating, he travelled with his blacklisted father to England where he attended University College London.

== Career ==
In 1966, he served as first assistant director on his father's film Modesty Blaise, which starred Monica Vitti, Terence Stamp and Dirk Bogarde. A year later he was an assistant to producer Denis O'Dell on the Beatles' television film Magical Mystery Tour. In 1968, he worked as production manager on Lindsay Anderson's If.....

In the 1970 film Ned Kelly, starring Mick Jagger, he was production supervisor, a task he revisited the following year in Melody, featuring former Oliver! child actors Mark Lester and Jack Wild, and Villain starring Richard Burton, Ian McShane and Donald Sinden. His associate producer work includes 1973's That'll Be The Day, directed by Claude Whatham, its 1974 sequel Stardust, directed by Michael Apted, and 1972's Fear Is the Key which featured a young Ben Kingsley. In 1975, he produced Slade in Flame. In 1977, he went uncredited as production consultant on The Disappearance starring Donald Sutherland. Shortly after, he was production associate on The Greek Tycoon starring Anthony Quinn and Jacqueline Bisset. Then, in 1979, he produced Agatha starring Vanessa Redgrave, again directed by Michael Apted.

In 1981, he produced the American documentary film Dance Craze and in 1988, served as executive producer on Taffin.

Since 1999, Losey has been involved in teaching at Bristol University as a part-time lecturer on film production and theory and is an honorary fellow of Exeter University.

== Private life ==
Losey lives in Somerset, England with his wife Titania Hardie, a writer. They have two daughters; Samantha and Zephyrine. He has two sons, Marek and Luke, from a previous marriage, both of whom are film-makers.
