= Luke Losey =

English film director & lighting designer

- Born: London, England, United Kingdom
- Occupations: Film director, lighting designer
- Parent(s): Gavrik Losey (father); Sally Chesterton (mother)
- Relatives: Joseph Losey (grandfather); Elizabeth Hawes (grandmother); Marek Losey (brother)

Luke Losey is a film director and lighting designer, based in London.

== Early life and education ==
Luke Losey was born to film producer Gavrik Losey and the former British ballet dancer Sally Chesterton. He is also the grandson of film director Joseph Losey and fashion designer Elizabeth Hawes. Losey grew up in Paddington, London, where he attended Hallfield Infants and Junior School in Royal Oak. He then attended Hampstead Comprehensive School in Camden, North London. He left school without qualifications due to his dyslexia.

Losey was interested in science fiction as a child. In 1975, he watched Stanley Kubrick's 2001: A Space Odyssey (1968) and received a Brownie camera, which sparked his interest in capturing images.

== Career ==
After leaving school in 1984, Losey worked as a runner on film sets and for production companies. He worked as a floor runner on Derek Jarman's film, Caravaggio (1986). He spent much of the late 1980s working as an art department runner/assistant on films, music videos, and ads. He worked on lighting and film projection in the early rave and squatting scene in north London.

In the early 1990s, he met the electronic band Orbital. With video artist Giles Thacker, he created the visual elements of Orbital's live show, containing imagery of clocks, danger signs, insects, and other types of content.

In 1998, Losey co-directed a music video for Orbital's single The Box, which starred Tilda Swinton and was inspired by time-lapse animation. The promo won a silver spire for the Best Short Film at the San Francisco Film Festival and was nominated for the best video award at the 1998 MTV Awards. It also closed the Edinburgh Film Festival, opened the London Film Festival, and was screened at Sundance. In 1999, Losey created a second music video for Orbital called Style, with Jonathan Charles as director of animation. Style used stop-motion animation and is a surreal take on Kafka's The Metamorphosis, influenced by the work of Jan Švankmajer.

== Later work ==
Losey directed music videos in the late 1990s and 2000s, including work for William Orbit (directing the video for his 1999 version of Adagio for Strings) and Mercury Rev. After a period directing TV adverts, Losey moved with his young family to Australia, where he continued to direct and pursue photography. He periodically returned to the UK to design live shows for bands, including The Libertines, Turin Brakes, The Verve, Magazine and Mott the Hoople. In 2009, he shot the video for the cover of Gang of Four's Damaged Goods by Gaz Coombes and Danny Goffey's side project The Hotrats.

His commercial work has included several internet campaigns, a return to photography and advertising work and several short films, most notably i in 2010, a two-minute short of an eyeball. i won the Best Sound Design award at the Hamburg Film Festival and was shown at the Rushes Short Film Festival as well as the Ann Arbor Film Festival. Losey also directed The Promise in 2011, which was likewise shown at the Ann Arbor Film festival. The Promise garnered critical acclaim but its dark subject matter – a slow-motion depiction of a woman being executed – limited its distribution. Losey, then UK-based, exhibited work at the Latitude Contemporary Art Exhibition in 2010.

Losey directed a major 3D experiential advertisement for Ralph Lauren and viral/cinema ads for Mulberry and Nokia.

In late 2013, he directed a short teaser film of Jessica Albarn's fairy tale book The Boy in the Oak. The film was narrated by Jude Law with music by Damon Albarn.

In 2015, Losey directed a Kickstarter financed dramatic short film shot on 35mm film by Serge Teulon starring Jonathan Pryce and Sara Kestelman entitled One Last Dance.

In 2018, Losey directed The Clock, a music film for electronic band 08:58 featuring Cillian Murphy.

In 2022, Losey directed the UKMVA nominated animation Smiley promo for Orbital's 30th anniversary, with Tim Varlow acting as animation director. The video is set in an alternative 1989, during a period in British subculture that bridged the gap between free festivals and big raves. The music samples the ‘A Trip Round Acid House’ edition of World In Action – the ITV documentary about the Acid House scene, with a 20-year-old Paul Hartnoll recalling being beaten up by police at a house party in Sevenoaks, Kent. The events portrayed in the film reflect Losey's experiences of the period, with the animation style deliberately reflecting the DIY ethos of the time. The narrative is a dystopian comedy featuring sock puppets, high-end CGI, background stock footage, specially filmed elements, stop-motion and stills photography. That same year, Losey directed the promo for the Orbital Sleaford Mods collaboration Dirty Rat. Losey started collaborating with Orbital on their live show as content and lighting director after an absence of over a decade.

== Filmography ==
Director

- The Box (1998)
- I (2007)
- The Boy in the Oak (2012)
- The Clock (2015)
- One Last Dance (2016)

Writer

- The Box (1998)
- I (2007)

Production Assistant

- Caprice (1986)
