= Nicholas Wapshott =

British journalist, broadcaster and author

- Born: 13 January 1952 (age 74); Dursley, Gloucestershire
- Education: B.A. in Politics
- Alma mater: University of York
- Occupations: Journalist, Author, Broadcaster
- Agent: Raphael Sagalyn
- Spouse: Louise Nicholson
- Children: William, Oliver

Nicholas Henry Wapshott (born 13 January 1952) is a British journalist, broadcaster and author. He was most recently the opinion editor at Newsweek, and a Reuters contributing columnist on the political economy. He has been an online content consultant to a number of media and private clients. He was the editor of The Times Saturday edition as well as the founding editor of The Times Magazine. He has written a number of biographies including those of Margaret Thatcher and Carol Reed. His Keynes Hayek: The Clash That Defined Modern Economics has become the standard text. His most recent book, The Sphinx: Franklin Roosevelt, the Isolationists, and the Road to World War II, was published by W. W. Norton & Company in November 2014. He is currently writing a sequel to Keynes Hayek.

== Early life ==
Nicholas Wapshott was born in Dursley, Gloucestershire, the second of four sons of Raymond and (Olivia) Beryl Wapshott. After attending Dursley County Primary School he won a Gloucester Foundation scholarship to Rendcomb College, Cirencester. He graduated in politics from the University of York in 1973. He is married to the author Louise Nicholson (born 1954); they have two sons.

== Career ==
After joining the Scotsman as a graduate trainee in 1973, based in Edinburgh, in 1976 Wapshott moved to London to join the staff of The Times, working first in editor William Rees-Mogg's department as a letters page editor, then became a features editor during which time he wrote a series of long form profiles of politicians and artistic figures, among them the Labour leader Michael Foot, the heir apparent to the Labour leadership, Peter Shore, the leader of the Liberal Democrats, Paddy Ashdown, playwrights Alan Bennett and Dennis Potter, and actors Dirk Bogarde and Alec Guinness. When Kenneth Thomson sold the paper to Rupert Murdoch, who installed Harold Evans as editor, Wapshott set up a weekly listings section, Preview.

In 1983 he moved to The Observer as features editor and founded a new weekly color magazine, Section 5. In 1987 he succeeded Robert Harris as political editor and reported the final days of Margaret Thatcher as Conservative leader. He was the first to report on the early life of John Major, the surprise successor to Thatcher, and correctly predicted his unlikely rise with a timely profile that revealed that the family of the new prime minister had shared a landing with prostitutes, that his father had been a tight rope walker and latterly a maker of concrete garden gnomes, and that, during an extended period of unemployment, he had been beaten to a job as a bus conductor by a West Indian woman.

In 1992, Wapshott returned to The Times to transform the lacklustre Saturday Review section into The Times Magazine, published each Saturday. On the strength of its success and a sharp improvement in Saturday sales he was made Saturday editor of the paper and added a number of separate sections that rivalled the heavyweight Sunday newspapers. As other papers were quick to follow suit, Wapshott is credited with transforming the Saturday newspaper market.

In 2001, he was appointed North America Correspondent of The Times, based in New York. He arrived three weeks before the September 11 attacks, but had returned briefly to London and was aboard the QE2 en route to New York when the Twin Towers fell. In 2005 he began writing business features and news stories for The Sunday Telegraph and the following year joined The New York Sun as national and foreign editor, writing a well regarded weekly political column.

=== Current work ===
He was most recently the opinion editor at Newsweek and one of the quartet of senior editors who revived the title in 2014 after a year of non-publication. He has been a regular guest on CNN, MSNBC, Fox News, ABC and the Charlie Rose Show and contributed on American matters to The New Statesman. In 2008, he was invited by Tina Brown to help launch The Daily Beast and was appointed Senior Editor. In 2009 he became an adjunct professor at The New School, New York, teaching short biographies and profiles. The same year he became a consultant to Oprah Winfrey's website Oprah.com. For a number of years he wrote a two columns a week for Thomson Reuters.

== Bibliography ==
- Wapshott, Nicholas. The Sphinx: Franklin Roosevelt, The Isolationists, and the Road to World War II. W. W. Norton & Company (2014). ISBN 978-0-393-08888-5.
- Wapshott, Nicholas. Keynes Hayek: The Clash That Defined Modern Economics]. W. W. Norton & Company (2011). ISBN 978-0-393-07748-3
- Wapshott, Nicholas. Ronald Reagan and Margaret Thatcher: A Political Marriage. Sentinel (2007). ISBN 1-59523-047-5.
- Wapshott, Nicholas and Timothy. Older: the biography of George Michael. Sidgwick & Jackson (1998). ISBN 0-283-06317-3.
- Wapshott, Nicholas. Carol Reed: A Biography. Alfred A. Knopf, Inc. (1994). ISBN 0-679-40288-8
- Wapshott, Nicholas. Rex Harrison. Chatto & Windus (1991). ISBN 0-670-83947-7.
- Wapshott, Nicholas. The Man Between: A biography of Carol Reed. Chatto & Windus (1990). ISBN 0-7011-3353-8. (published in US as Carol Reed: A Biography. Knopf (1994))
- Wapshott, Nicholas and Brock, George. Thatcher. MacDonald/Futura (1983). ISBN 0-356-09503-7.
- Wapshott, Nicholas. Peter O'Toole. Hodder & Stoughton (1981). ISBN 0-8253-0196-3. (Beaufort USA, (1983))
