= Joseph Losey =

American theatre and film director (1909–1984)

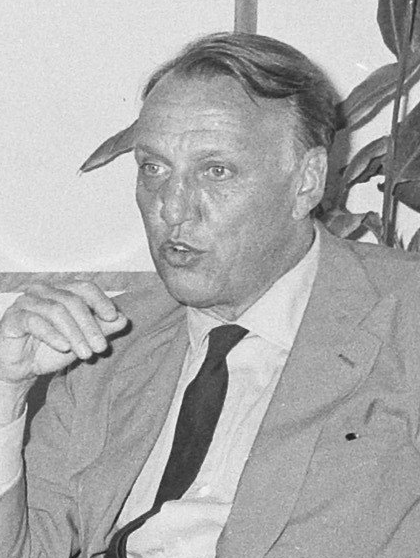
- Losey in 1965
- Born: Joseph Walton Losey III; January 14, 1909; La Crosse, Wisconsin, U.S.
- Died: June 22, 1984 (aged 75); London, England
- Education: Dartmouth College; Harvard University
- Occupations: Director; producer; screenwriter
- Years active: 1933–1984
- Spouses: Elizabeth Hawes (m. 1937; div. 1944) Louise Stuart (m. 1944; div. 1953) Dorothy Bromiley (m. 1956; div. 1963) Patricia Mohan (m. 1970)
- Children: 2, including Gavrik
- Awards: See below

Joseph Walton Losey III (/ˈloʊsi/; January 14, 1909 – June 22, 1984) was an American film and theatre director, producer, and screenwriter. Born in Wisconsin, he studied in Germany with Bertolt Brecht and then returned to the United States. Blacklisted by Hollywood in the 1950s, he moved to Europe where he made the remainder of his films, mostly in the United Kingdom.

Among the most critically and commercially successful were his three films with screenplays by Harold Pinter: The Servant (1963), Accident (1967), and The Go-Between (1971). His 1976 film Monsieur Klein won the César Awards for Best Film and Best Director. Other notable films included The Boy with Green Hair (1948), Eva (1962), King & Country (1964), Modesty Blaise (1966), Figures in a Landscape (1970), A Doll's House (1973), Galileo (1975), and Don Giovanni (1979). Though drubbed by critics and a box-office failure, Boom! (1968) was sometimes cited by Losey as his personal favorite, and Tennessee Williams considered it the best movie adaptation of one of his plays. The film starred Elizabeth Taylor and Richard Burton, both of whom worked with Losey again: Taylor in Secret Ceremony (1968) and Burton in The Assassination of Trotsky (1972).

Losey was also a four-time nominee for both the Palme d'Or (which he won once) and the Golden Lion, and a two-time BAFTA Award nominee.

== Early life and career ==
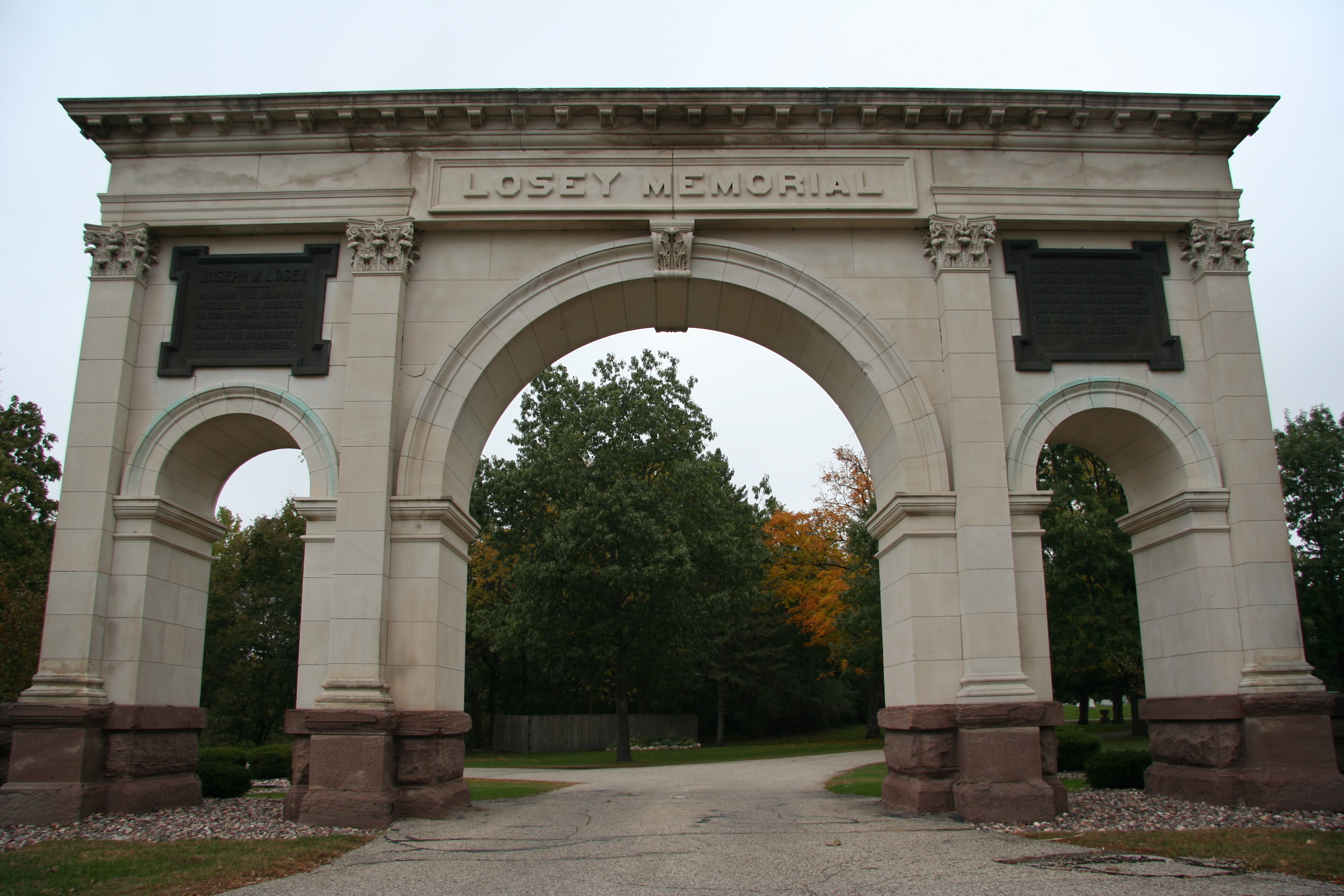
Losey Memorial Arch (1901) was erected by the city of La Crosse, Wisconsin, in tribute to Losey's grandfather, a prominent attorney and civic leader.

Joseph Walton Losey III was born on January 14, 1909, in La Crosse, Wisconsin, where he and Nicholas Ray were high-school classmates at La Crosse Central High School. He attended Dartmouth College and Harvard University, beginning as a student of medicine and ending in drama.

Losey became a major figure in New York City political theatre, first directing the controversial failure Little Old Boy in 1933. He declined to direct a staged version of Dodsworth by Sinclair Lewis, which led Lewis to offer him his first work written for the stage, Jayhawker. Losey directed the show, which had a brief run. Bosley Crowther in The New York Times noted that "The play, being increasingly wordy, presents staging problems that Joe Losey's direction does not always solve. It is hard to tell who is responsible for the obscure parts in the story."

He visited the Soviet Union for several months in 1935, to study the Russian stage. In Moscow he participated in a seminar on film taught by Sergei Eisenstein. He also met Bertolt Brecht and the composer Hanns Eisler, who were visiting Moscow at the time.

In 1936, he directed Triple-A Plowed Under on Broadway, a production of the Works Progress Administration's Federal Theatre Project. He then directed the second Living Newspaper presentation, Injunction Granted.

Losey served in the U.S. military during World War II and was discharged in 1945. From 1946 to 1947, Losey worked with Bertolt Brecht—who was living in exile in Los Angeles—and Charles Laughton on the preparations for the staging of Brecht's play Galileo (Life of Galileo) which he and Brecht eventually co-directed with Laughton in the title role, and with music by Eisler. The play premiered on July 30, 1947, at the Coronet Theatre in Beverly Hills. On October 30, 1947, Losey accompanied Brecht to Washington D.C. for Brecht's appearance before the House Un-American Activities Committee (HUAC). Brecht left the US the following day. Losey went on to stage Galileo, again with Laughton in the title role, in New York City where it opened on December 7, 1947, at the Maxine Elliott Theatre. More than 25 years later Losey, in exile in England, directed a film version of Brecht's play Galileo (1975).

Losey's first feature film was a political allegory titled The Boy with Green Hair (1947), starring Dean Stockwell as Peter, a war orphan who is subject to ridicule after he awakens one morning to find his hair mysteriously turned green.

Seymour Nebenzal, the producer of Fritz Lang's classic M (1931), hired Losey to direct a remake set in Los Angeles rather than Berlin. In the new version, released in 1951, the killer's name was changed from Hans Beckert to Martin W. Harrow. Nebenzal's son Harold was associate producer of this version.

== Politics and exile ==
During the 1930s and 1940s, Losey maintained extensive contacts with people on the political left, including radicals and communists or those who would eventually become such. He had collaborated with Bertolt Brecht and had a long association with Hanns Eisler, both targets of HUAC's interest. Losey had written to the Immigration and Naturalization Service in support of a resident visa for Eisler, who had many radical associations. They had collaborated on a "political cabaret" from 1937 to 1939, and Losey had invited Eisler to compose music for a short public-relations film that he had been commissioned to produce for presentation at the 1939 New York World's Fair, Pete Roleum and His Cousins.

Losey had also worked on the Federal Theatre Project, long a target of HUAC. Losey directed the play Triple-A Plowed Under, which been denounced by HUAC's antecedent, the Dies Committee, as communist propaganda. His Hollywood collaborators included a long list of other HUAC targets, including Dalton Trumbo and Ring Lardner Jr.

Losey's first wife Elizabeth Hawes worked with a wide range of communists and anticommunist liberals at the radical newspaper PM. After their divorce in 1944, she wrote about working as a union organizer just after World War II, where "one preferred the Communists to the Red-Baiters." At some point, probably early in the 1940s, the FBI maintained dossiers on both Losey and Hawes, and that of Losey charged that he was a Stalinist agent as of 1945.

In 1946, Losey joined the Communist Party USA. He later explained to a French interviewer:

I had a feeling that I was being useless in Hollywood, that I'd been cut off from New York activity and I felt that my existence was unjustified. It was a kind of Hollywood guilt that led me into that kind of commitment. And I think that the work that I did on a much freer, more personal and independent basis for the political left in New York, before going to Hollywood, was much more valuable socially.

Losey was under a long-term contract with Dore Schary at RKO when Howard Hughes purchased the company in 1948 and began purging it of leftists. Losey later explained how Hughes tested employees to determine whether they had communist sympathies:

I was offered a film called I Married a Communist, which I turned down categorically. I later learned that it was a touchstone for establishing who was a "red": you offered I Married a Communist to anybody you thought was a Communist, and if they turned it down, they were.

Hughes responded by holding Losey to his contract without assigning him any work. In mid-1949, Schary persuaded Hughes to release Losey, who soon began working as an independent on The Lawless for Paramount Pictures. Soon he was working on a three-picture contract with Stanley Kramer. His name was mentioned by two witnesses before HUAC in the spring of 1951. Losey's attorney suggested arranging a deal with the committee for testimony in secret. Instead, Losey abandoned his work editing The Big Night and left for Europe while his ex-wife Louise departed for Mexico a few days later. HUAC took weeks to try unsuccessfully to serve them with a subpoena compelling their testimony.

After more than a year working on Stranger on the Prowl in Italy, Losey returned to the U.S. on October 12, 1952. He found himself unemployable:

I was [in the United States] for about a month and there was no work in theatre, no work in radio, no work in education or advertising, and none in films, in anything. For one brief moment, I was going to do the Arthur Miller play The Crucible. Then they got scared because I had been named. So after a month of finding that there was no possible way in which I could make a living in this country, I left. I didn't come back for twelve years.... I didn't stay away for reasons of fear, it was just that I didn't have any money. I didn't have any work.

He returned briefly to Rome, and settled in London on January 4, 1953.

== Career in Europe ==
"As his many interviews reveal, Losey was an artist who thought long and hard about his work, a man of exceptional candor, as ready to judge some of his films harshly as to express his pleasure in others." – Critics James Palmer and Michael Riley in The Films of Joseph Losey (1993).

Losey settled in Britain and worked as a director of genre films. His first British film The Sleeping Tiger (1954), a noir crime thriller, was made under the pseudonym of Victor Hanbury, because the stars of the film, Alexis Smith and Alexander Knox, feared being blacklisted by Hollywood in turn if it became known they had worked with him. It was financed by Nat Cohen at Anglo-Amalgamated who also financed The Intimate Stranger (1956), where Losey carried a pseudonym as well.

His films covered a wide range from the Regency melodrama The Gypsy and the Gentleman (1958) to the gangster film for Cohen, The Criminal (1960).

Losey was also originally slated to direct the Hammer Films production X the Unknown (1956), but after a few days' work the star Dean Jagger refused to work with a supposed Communist sympathiser and Losey was removed from the project. An alternative version is that Losey was replaced due to illness. Losey was later hired by Hammer Films to direct The Damned, a 1962 British science fiction film based on H.L. Lawrence's novel The Children of Light.

=== Collaborations with Harold Pinter ===
In the 1960s, Losey began working with playwright Harold Pinter, in what became a long friendship and initiated a successful screenwriting career for Pinter. Losey directed three enduring classics based on Pinter's screenplays: The Servant (1963), Accident (1967) and The Go-Between (1971). The Servant won three British Academy Film Awards. Accident won the Grand Prix Spécial du Jury award at the 1967 Cannes Film Festival. The Go-Between won the Golden Palm Award at the 1971 Cannes Film Festival, four prizes at the 1972 BAFTA awards, and Best British Screenplay at the 1972 Writers' Guild of Great Britain awards. Each of the three films examines the politics of class and sexuality in England at the end of the 19th century (The Go-Between) and in the 1960s. In The Servant, a manservant facilitates the moral and psychological degradation of his privileged and rich employer. Accident explores male lust, hypocrisy and ennui among the educated middle class as two Oxford University tutors competitively objectify a student against the backdrop of their seemingly idyllic lives. In The Go-Between, a young middle-class boy, the summer guest of an upper-class family, becomes the messenger for an affair between a working-class farmer and the daughter of his hosts.

Although Losey's films are generally naturalistic, The Servant's hybridisation of Losey's signature Baroque style, film noir, naturalism and expressionism, and both Accident's and The Go-Between's radical cinematography, use of montage, voice over and musical score, amount to a sophisticated construction of cinematic time and narrative perspective that edges this work in the direction of neorealist cinema. All three films are marked by Pinter's sparse, elliptical and enigmatically subtextual dialogue, something Losey often develops a visual correlate for (and occasionally even works against) by means of dense and cluttered mise-en-scène and peripatetic camera work.

In 1966, Losey directed Modesty Blaise, a comedy spy-fi film produced in the United Kingdom and released worldwide in 1966. Pinter made uncredited contributions to the script. Sometimes considered a James Bond parody, it was based on the popular comic strip of the same name by Peter O'Donnell and Jim Holdaway.

Losey also worked with Pinter on The Proust Screenplay (1972), an adaptation of A la recherche du temps perdu by Marcel Proust. Losey died before the project's financing could be assembled.

=== Other productions ===
Losey directed Robert Shaw and Malcolm McDowell in the action-thriller film Figures in a Landscape (1970), adapted by Shaw from the novel by Barry England. The film was shot in various locations in Spain.

Losey was President of the Jury of the 1972 Cannes Film Festival.

In 1975, Losey realized a long-planned film adaptation of Brecht's Galileo released as Life of Galileo starring Chaim Topol. Galileo was produced as part of the subscription film series of the American Film Theatre, but shot in the UK.

Losey's Monsieur Klein (1976) examined the day in Occupied France when Jews in and around Paris were arrested for deportation. He said he so completely rejected naturalism in film that in this case he divided his shooting schedule into three "visual categories": Unreality, Reality and Abstract. He demonstrated a facility for working in the French language and Monsieur Klein gave Alain Delon as star and producer one of French cinema's earliest chances to highlight the background to the infamous Vel' d'Hiv Roundup of French Jews in July 1942. Losey won a César Award for Best Director.

In 1979, Losey filmed Mozart's opera Don Giovanni, shot in Villa La Rotonda and the Veneto region of Italy; this film was nominated for several César Awards in 1980, including Best Director.

In 1982, Losey directed The Trout in France, a Roger Vailland adaptation starring Isabelle Huppert and Jeanne Moreau. His final film was 1985's Steaming, an adaptation of Nell Dunn's 1981 play. It was released posthumously, nearly one year after Losey's death from cancer.

== Personal life ==
"David Caute's careful biography showed Losey’s creativity growing out of a cheerless vanity that kept few friends. He seemed determined to give others no chance of liking him."

—Film historian David Thomson in The New Biographical Dictionary of Film (2002).

In 1964, Losey told The New York Times: "I'd love to work in America again, but it would have to be just the right thing." He told an interviewer the year before he died that he was not bitter about being blacklisted: "Without it I would have three Cadillacs, two swimming pools and millions of dollars, and I'd be dead. It was terrifying, it was disgusting, but you can get trapped by money and complacency. A good shaking up never did anyone any harm."

Dartmouth College, his alma mater, awarded Losey an honorary degree in 1973. In 1983, the University of Wisconsin–Madison did the same.

Losey married four times and divorced thrice. He married Elizabeth Hawes on July 24, 1937. They had a son, Gavrik Losey, in 1938, but divorced in 1944. Gavrik helped with the production on some of his father's films. Gavrik's two sons are film directors Marek Losey and Luke Losey.

Later in 1944, Losey married Louise Stuart; they divorced in 1953. From 1956 to 1963, Losey was married to British actress Dorothy Bromiley. They had a son, Joshua Losey, born on July 16, 1957, who became an actor. On September 29, 1970, Losey married Patricia Mohan in King's Lynn, Norfolk, shortly after finishing shooting The Go-Between. Patricia Losey went on to adapt Lorenzo Da Ponte's opera libretto for Losey's Don Giovanni and Nell Dunn's play for Steaming.

=== Death ===
He died from cancer at his home in Chelsea, London, on June 22, 1984, aged 75, four weeks after completing his last film Steaming.

== Media portrayals ==
In Guilty by Suspicion, Irwin Winkler's 1991 film about the Hollywood blacklist, McCarthyism, and the activities of the House Un-American Activities Committee, Martin Scorsese plays an American filmmaker named "Joe Lesser" who leaves Hollywood for England rather than face HUAC investigations. The fictional director played by Scorsese is based on Joseph Losey.

== Filmography ==
=== Feature films ===
Year	Title	Functioned as			Notes
Year	Title	Director	Writer	Producer	Notes
1948	The Boy with Green Hair	Yes	No	No	Feature directorial debut
1950	The Lawless	Yes	No	No	
1951	M	Yes	No	No	
1951	The Prowler	Yes	No	No	
1951	The Big Night	Yes	Yes	No	
1952	Stranger on the Prowl	Yes	No	No	First non-American film
1954	The Sleeping Tiger	Yes	No	Yes	
1956	The Intimate Stranger	Yes	No	No	U.S. title: Finger of Guilt
1957	Time Without Pity	Yes	No	No	
1958	The Gypsy and the Gentleman	Yes	No	No	
1959	Blind Date	Yes	No	No	U.S. title: Chance Meeting
1960	The Criminal	Yes	No	No	U.S. title: The Concrete Jungle
1962	Eva	Yes	No	No	U.S. title: The Devil's Woman
1962	The Damned	Yes	No	No	U.S. title: These Are The Damned
1963	The Servant	Yes	No	Yes	
1964	King & Country	Yes	No	Yes	
1966	Modesty Blaise	Yes	No	No	
1967	Accident	Yes	No	No	
1968	Boom	Yes	No	No	
1968	Secret Ceremony	Yes	No	No	
1970	Figures in a Landscape	Yes	No	No	
1971	The Go-Between	Yes	No	No	
1972	The Assassination of Trotsky	Yes	No	Yes	
1973	A Doll's House	Yes	No	Yes	
1975	The Romantic Englishwoman	Yes	No	No	
1975	Galileo	Yes	No	No	
1976	Monsieur Klein	Yes	No	No	
1978	Roads to the South	Yes	No	No	
1979	Don Giovanni	Yes	Yes	No	
1982	The Trout	Yes	Yes	No	
1985	Steaming	Yes	No	No	

=== Short films ===
Year	Title	Functioned as			Notes
Year	Title	Director	Writer	Producer	Notes
1939	Pete Roleum and His Cousins	Yes	Yes	Yes	
1941	Youth Gets a Break	Yes	Yes	No	
1941	A Child Went Forth	Yes	Yes	Yes	
1945	A Gun in His Hand	Yes	No	No	
1947	Leben des Galilei	Yes	No	No	
1955	A Man on the Beach	Yes	Yes	No	
1959	First on the Road	Yes	No	No	Promotional short for the launch of the Ford Anglia 105E

== Theatre credits ==
Year	Title	Venue	Notes	Ref.
1933	Little Ol' Boy	Playhouse Theatre, New York		
1934	A Bride for the Unicorn	Brattleboro Theater, Cambridge		
1934	Jayhawker	National Theatre, Washington, D.C.		
1934	Jayhawker	Garrick Theatre, Philadelphia		
1934	Jayhawker	Cort Theatre		
1934	Gods of the Lightning	Peabody Theater, Boston		
1935	Waiting for Lefty	Moscow		
1936	Hymn to the Rising Sun	Fourteenth Street Theatre, New York		
1936	Conjur Man Dies	Lafayette Theatre, New York		
1936	Triple-A Plowed Under	Biltmore Theatre, New York	Federal Theatre Project production	
1936	Who Fights This Battle?	Delaney Hotel, Hoosick		
1938	Sunup to Sundown	Hudson Theatre, New York		
1947	The Great Campaign	Princess Theatre, New York		
1947–48	Life of Galileo	Maxine Elliott's Theatre, New York		
1954	The Wooden Dish	Phoenix Theatre, London		
1955	The Night of the Ball	Noël Coward Theatre, London		
1975	Waiting for Lefty	Hopkins Center for the Arts, Hanover		
1980	Boris Godunov	Paris Opera, Pasris		

=== Other productions ===
- Political Cabaret (1937)
- Russian War Relief (1940–43), shows in New York, Washington, Boston, Philadelphia, Chicago, Detroit
- Franklin D. Roosevelt Memorial Show (1945), Hollywood Bowl
- 18th Academy Awards (1946), Grauman's Chinese Theatre
- 19th Academy Awards (1947), Grauman's Chinese Theatre

== Recurring collaborators ==
=== Actors ===
Work Actor	1950	1951	1952	1954	1957	1959	1960	1962		1963	1964	1966	1967	1968		1971	1972	1973	1975	1975	1976	1979	1982	1985
Work Actor	The Lawless	The Big Night	Stranger on the Prowl	The Sleeping Tiger	Time Without Pity	Blind Date	The Criminal	The Damned	Eva	The Servant	King and Country	Modesty Blaise	Accident	Boom!	Secret Ceremony	The Go-Between	The Assassination of Trotsky	A Doll's House	The Romantic Englishwoman	Galileo	Monsieur Klein	Don Giovanni	The Trout	Steaming
Giorgio Albertazzi									X mark								X mark							
Stanley Baker						X mark	X mark		X mark				X mark											
Dirk Bogarde				X mark						X mark	X mark	X mark	X mark											
Richard Burton														X mark			X mark							
Macdonald Carey	X mark							X mark																
Alain Delon																	X mark				X mark			
Edward Fox																X mark		X mark		X mark				
Alexander Knox				X mark				X mark				X mark	X mark											
Michael Lonsdale																			X mark	X mark	X mark			
Joan Lorring		X mark	X mark																					
Patrick Magee							X mark			X mark										X mark				
Sarah Miles										X mark														X mark
Leo McKern					X mark						X mark													
Jeanne Moreau									X mark												X mark		X mark	
Ruggero Raimondi																						X mark	X mark	
Michael Redgrave					X mark											X mark								
Delphine Seyrig													X mark					X mark						
Alexis Smith				X mark																			X mark	
Elizabeth Taylor														X mark	X mark									
John Van Eyssen						X mark	X mark																	
James Villiers								X mark	X mark		X mark													

=== Crew ===
Work Personnel	1948	1951	1952	1954	1957	1958	1959	1960	1962		1963	1964	1966	1967	1968		1970	1971	1972	1973	1975	1975	1976	1978	1979	1982	1985
Work Personnel	The Boy with Green Hair	The Big Night	Stranger on the Prowl	The Sleeping Tiger	Time Without Pity	The Gypsy and the Gentleman	Blind Date	The Criminal	The Damned	Eva	The Servant	King and Country	Modesty Blaise	Accident	Boom!	Secret Ceremony	Figures in a Landscape	The Go-Between	The Assassination of Trotsky	A Doll's House	The Romantic Englishwoman	Galileo	Monsieur Klein	Roads to the South	Don Giovanni	The Trout	Steaming
Henri Alekan			X mark														X mark									X mark	
Ben Barzman	X mark		X mark		X mark		X mark																				
Reginald Beck						X mark				X mark			X mark	X mark	X mark	X mark	X mark	X mark	X mark		X mark	X mark	X mark	X mark	X mark		X mark
Hugo Butler		X mark								X mark																	
John Dankworth								X mark			X mark		X mark	X mark													
Gerry Fisher														X mark		X mark		X mark		X mark	X mark		X mark	X mark	X mark		
Richard Hartley																					X mark	X mark				X mark	
John Heyman															X mark	X mark		X mark		X mark							
Jack Hildyard						X mark							X mark														
Evan Jones									X mark	X mark		X mark	X mark														
Michel Legrand										X mark								X mark		X mark							
Patricia Losey											X mark													X mark	X mark	X mark	X mark
Richard Macdonald					X mark	X mark	X mark	X mark	X mark	X mark	X mark	X mark	X mark		X mark	X mark			X mark	X mark	X mark	X mark					
Reginald Mills				X mark			X mark	X mark	X mark		X mark	X mark															
Harold Pinter											X mark			X mark				X mark									
Norman Priggen											X mark	X mark	X mark	X mark	X mark	X mark		X mark	X mark								
Richard Rodney Bennett							X mark									X mark	X mark										
Douglas Slocombe											X mark				X mark												
Franco Solinas																			X mark				X mark				

== Awards and nominations ==
Institution	Year	Category	Title	Result	Ref.
British Academy Film Award	1968	Outstanding British Film	Accident	Nominated	
British Academy Film Award	1972	Best Direction	The Go-Between	Nominated	
Cahiers du Cinéma	1964	Top 10 Films of the Year	The Servant	10th place	
Cannes Film Festival	1962	Palme d'Or	Eva	Nominated	
Cannes Film Festival	1966	Palme d'Or	Modesty Blaise	Nominated	
Cannes Film Festival	1967	Palme d'Or	Accident	Nominated	
Cannes Film Festival	1971	Palme d'Or	The Go-Between	Won	
Cannes Film Festival	1976	Palme d'Or	Monsieur Klein	Nominated	
César Awards	1977	Best Film	Monsieur Klein	Won	
César Awards	1977	Best Director	Monsieur Klein	Won	
César Awards	1980	Best Film	Don Giovanni	Nominated	
César Awards	1980	Best Director	Don Giovanni	Nominated	
Nastro d'Argento	1966	Best Foreign Director	King and Country	Nominated	
Nastro d'Argento	1966	Best Foreign Director	The Servant	Won	
Nastro d'Argento	1972	Best Foreign Director	The Go-Between	Nominated	
New York Film Critics Circle	1964	Best Director	The Servant	Nominated	
San Sebastián International Film Festival	1954	Golden Shell	The Sleeping Tiger	Nominated	
Sant Jordi Awards	1972	Best Foreign Film	The Go-Between	Won	
Taormina Film Fest	1978	Golden Charybdis	Roads to the South	Nominated	
Venice Film Festival	1962	Golden Lion	Eva	Nominated	
Venice Film Festival	1963	Golden Lion	The Servant	Nominated	
Venice Film Festival	1964	Golden Lion	King & Country	Nominated	
Venice Film Festival	1982	Golden Lion	The Trout	Nominated	

== Sources ==
- Hirsch, Foster. 1980. Joseph Losey. Twayne Publishers, Boston, Massachusetts. ISBN 0-8057-9257-0
- Maras, Robert. 2012. Dissecting class relations: The film collaborations of Joseph Losey and Harold Pinter. World Socialist Web Site, May 28, 2012. https://www.wsws.org/en/articles/2012/05/lose-m28.html Accessed 12 October 2024.
- Palmer, James and Riley, Michael. 1993. The Films of Joseph Losey. Cambridge University Press, Cambridge, England. ISBN 0-521-38386-2
- Sanjek, David. 2002. Cold, Cold Heart: Joseph Losey’s The Damned and the Compensations of Genre. Senses of Cinema, July 2002. Director: Joseph Losey Issue 21.https://www.sensesofcinema.com/2002/director-joseph-losey/losey_damned/ Accessed 10 October 2024.
- Thomson, David. 2002. The New Biographical Dictionary of Film. Alfred A. Knopf, New York. ISBN 0-375-41128-3
