= Conduct Unbecoming (play) =

Play by Barry England

- Written by: Barry England
- Subject: political scandal
- Setting: India, 1880s.

Premiere
- Date: 1969
- Place: Theatre Royal

Conduct Unbecoming is a play by Barry England. The plot concerns a scandal in a British regiment stationed in India in the 1880s.

== Plot ==
The widow of a heroic officer is assaulted by an unrevealed comrade in arms and an investigation takes place to determine his identity. A kangaroo court is convened, as the regiment doesn't wish to have itself dishonored in public. A second lieutenant by the name of Edward Millington is accused of the assault by Mrs Hasseltine, the victim and, at first, everyone is prejudiced against him. Millington himself has no interest in remaining in the army, even though his father was a decorated official. Millington's friend and comrade Arthur Drake is given the duty of defending Millington, much to his initial displeasure. But as events begin to unfold, Drake realizes that Millington is in fact not guilty, and slowly manages to convince everyone else as well. But the question remains... who is guilty?

== Theatre ==
It was first staged in May 1969 at the Theatre Royal in Bristol, then transferred to the Queen's Theatre in the West End in July.

The Broadway production was directed by Val May. After 16 previews, it opened on 12 October 1970 at the Ethel Barrymore Theatre and ran for 144 performances. The cast included Michael Barrington, Michael Bradshaw, Jeremy Clyde, Paul Jones, Donald Pickering, Nicholas Hammond and Elizabeth Shepherd. Pickering was nominated for the Tony Award for Best Featured Actor in a Play.

In 1975, Robert Enders adapted the play for Conduct Unbecoming, a British Lion Film Corporation feature film directed by Michael Anderson and starring Michael York, Stacy Keach, Susannah York, Christopher Plummer, Richard Attenborough and Trevor Howard. In the same year a novelisation was created by the writer Rupert Croft-Cooke.
