= Peggy Maley =

American actress (1923–2007)

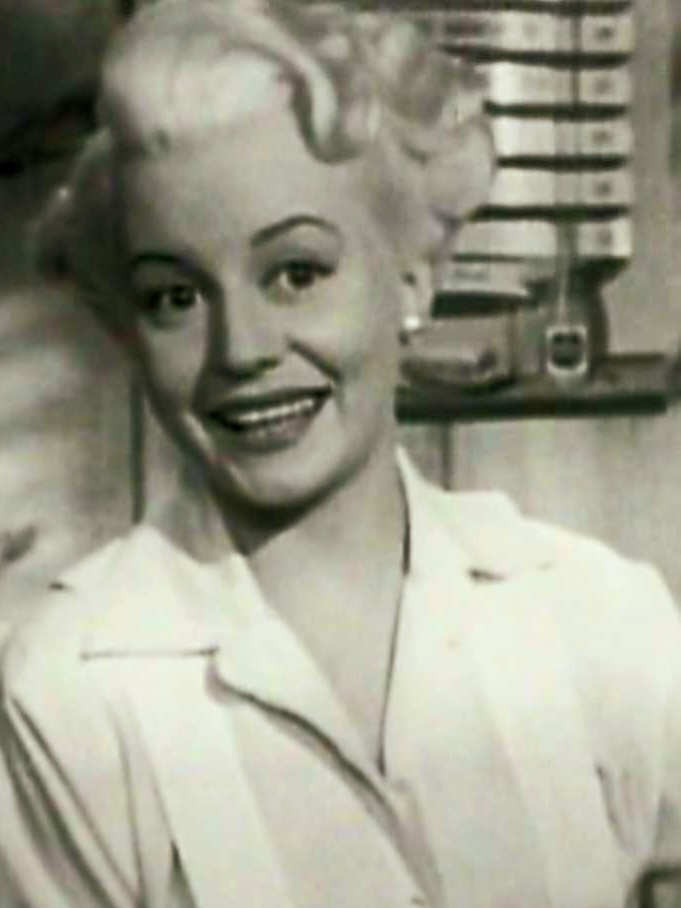
- Maley in The Lady Says No (1952)
- Born: Margaret June Maley; June 8, 1923; Pottsville, Pennsylvania, U.S.
- Died: October 1, 2007 (aged 84); Hatfield, Pennsylvania,U.S.
- Occupation: Actress
- Years active: 1943–1961
- Spouses: Ricky Rafield (m. 1952; div. 1952) Donald Schonbrunn (m. 1972; div. 1994)

Margaret June "Peggy" Maley (June 8, 1923 – October 1, 2007) was an American actress who appeared in film and television. In 1942, aged 18 or 19, she was crowned Miss Atlantic City.

== Career ==
=== Film ===
Maley delivered the feeder line to Marlon Brando in the film The Wild One: "Hey, Johnny, what are you rebelling against?"

=== Stage ===
Maley was in the Broadway productions of I Gotta Get Out (1947) and Joy to the World (1948).

=== Television ===
Maley had a brief seven-year acting career on television from 1953 to 1960. Her first appearance was as Diane Chandler in Ramar of the Jungle. She made three appearances in The Star and the Story, three on Dragnet, starring Jack Webb, three on Richard Diamond, Private Detective, and three on Perry Mason, starring Raymond Burr.

In 1957 she played Lola Florey in the Perry Mason episode, "The Case of the Silent Partner", and played "The Blonde Woman" in the 1958 episode of The Walter Winchell File "The Reporter". She made her final television appearance in 1960 as Verna in Lock-Up starring MacDonald Carey.

She appeared in Private Secretary January 10, 1954. She appeared in the Wanted Dead or Alive episode "Double Fee" with Steve McQueen (original air date March 21, 1959).

== Personal life ==
Maley was the daughter of James and Grace (née Williams) Maley. She wed garment manufacturer Ricky Rafield in 1952, a marriage that lasted only 12 weeks before it was annulled. Her second marriage was in 1972 to policeman Donald Schonbrunn from New York; that marriage also was eventually dissolved.

== Filmography ==
Year	Title	Role	Notes
1943	A Guy Named Joe	Woman	Uncredited
1944	Broadway Rhythm	Autograph Seeker	Uncredited
1944	Two Girls and a Sailor	Dream Girl	Uncredited
1944	Meet the People	Show Girl	Uncredited
1944	Bathing Beauty	Co-Ed	Uncredited
1944	Since You Went Away	Marine's Second Girl Friend	Uncredited
1944	Thirty Seconds Over Tokyo	Girl in Officers' Club	Uncredited
1945	Between Two Women	Showgirl	Uncredited
1945	Anchors Aweigh	Lana Turner Impersonator	Uncredited
1946	The Harvey Girls	Dance-Hall Girl	Uncredited
1946	The Thrill of Brazil	Show Girl	Uncredited
1947	Down to Earth	Muse	Uncredited
1951	The Lady Says No	Midge	
1951	I Want You	Gladys	
1953	The Bigamist	Phone Operator	
1953	The Wild One	Mildred	
1954	Gypsy Colt	Pat	
1954	Drive a Crooked Road	Marge	Uncredited
1954	Siege at Red River	Sally - Showgirl	Uncredited
1954	Human Desire	Jean	
1955	Moonfleet	Tavern Maid	Uncredited
1955	I Died a Thousand Times	Kranmer's Girl	Uncredited
1956	Meet Me in Las Vegas	Minor Role	Uncredited
1956	Indestructible Man	Francine	
1957	The Guns of Fort Petticoat	Lucy Conover	
1957	The Midnight Story	Veda Pinelli	
1957	The Brothers Rico	Jean	Uncredited
1957	Escape from San Quentin	Georgie Gilbert	Uncredited
1957	Man on the Prowl	Alma Doran	
1958	Live Fast, Die Young	Sue Hawkins	
1958	The Gun Runners	Blonde Barfly	Uncredited
1958	Tarawa Beachhead	Blonde at Bar	Uncredited
1958	Tombstone Territory s1 ep33	Belle Winters	
1959	Okefenokee	Ricki Hart	
1959	The Rookie	Aunt Myrtle - Radio Character	Uncredited
