= Michael Anderson Jr. =

English actor (born 1943)

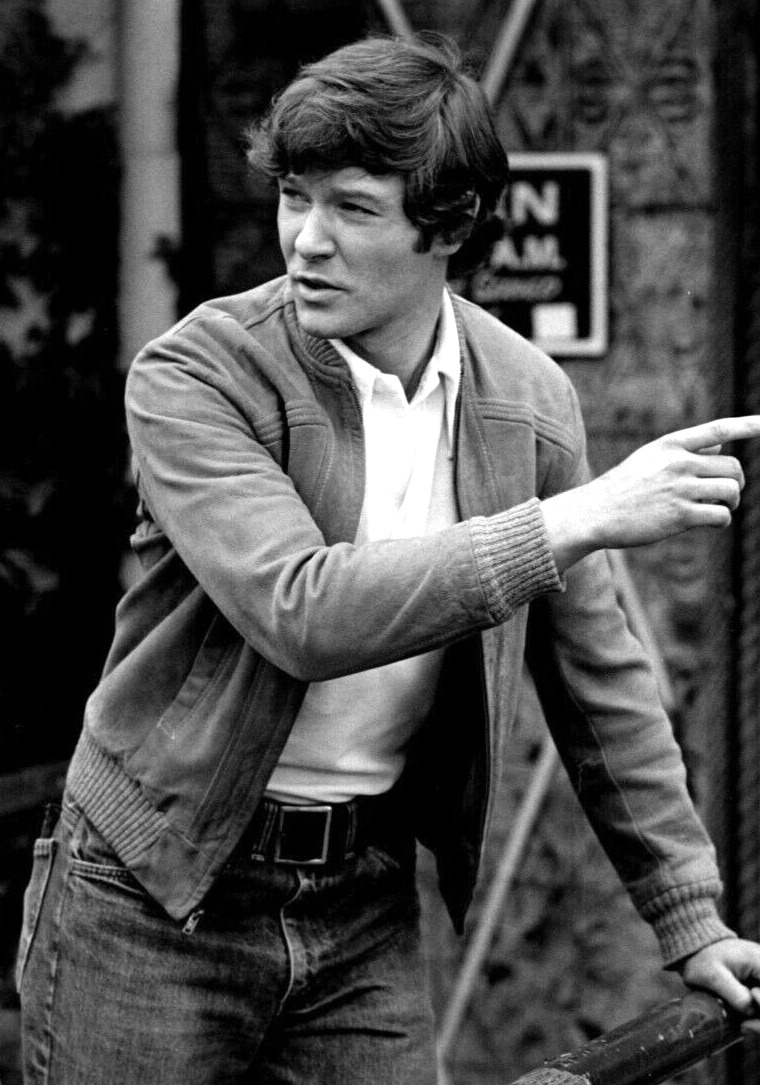
- Anderson in 1974
- Born: Michael Joseph Anderson Jr. 6 August 1943 (age 83); Hillingdon, Middlesex, England
- Occupation: Actor
- Years active: 1956–1998
- Spouses: Vikki Harrington (m. 1966; div. 1973) Maria O'Brien (m. 1976; div. 1984) Marina Anderson (m. 1986; div. 1990)
- Children: 4
- Father: Michael Anderson
- Relatives: Adrienne Ellis (stepmother); Laurie Holden (stepsister)

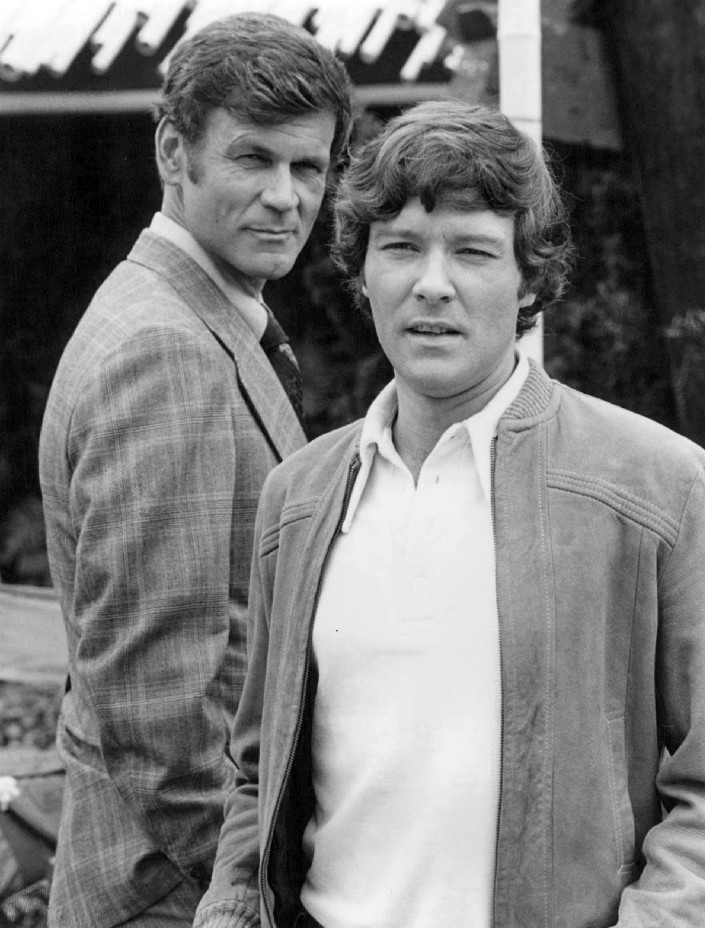
Don Murray and Michael Anderson Jr. in an episode of Police Story (1975)

Michael Joseph Anderson Jr. (born 6 August 1943) is a British-American retired actor whose 40-year career includes roles in The Sundowners, In Search of the Castaways, The Sons of Katie Elder, and Logan's Run. During the 1966 television season he starred as Clayt Monroe in The Monroes.

== Early life ==
Anderson was born in Hillingdon, England on 6 August 1943, the son of Betty Jordan and film director Michael Anderson. He grew up wanting to act in his father's films. He studied drama and ballet at Arts Educational Schools, London, and by the age of 8 began performing on live radio and television shows. He also danced with the London Festival Ballet, now the English National Ballet.

== American acting career ==
Anderson's first major American film was The Sundowners (1960). In 1962 he was cast as John Glenarvan in the Walt Disney film In Search of the Castaways.

From 7 September 1966, to 30 August 1967, Anderson played 18-year-old Clayt Monroe, one of five orphaned siblings, in the ABC Western series The Monroes. Before the series filming began it was reported that Anderson "spent five months getting rid of his English accent."

In 1976, Anderson finally had a chance to act in one of his father's films, playing Doc in Logan's Run.

== Personal life ==
Anderson dated actress Cheryl Holdridge in 1964 and had previously proposed to Hayley Mills.

Anderson married three times. From 1966 to 1973, he was married to Victoria Harrington. They had three children. From 1976 to 1984, he was married Maria O’Brien. They had one child. From 1986 to 1990, he was married to Marina Anderson.

On 12 December 1988, Anderson became a naturalized United States citizen. He retired from acting in 1998.

== Filmography ==
- The Moonraker (1958) – Martin Strangeways
- Tiger Bay (1959) – Youth (uncredited)
- The Sundowners (1960) – Sean Carmody
- Play It Cool (1962) – Alvin
- Reach for Glory (1962) – Lewis Craig
- In Search of the Castaways (1962) – John Glenarvan
- Dear Heart (1964) – Patrick
- The Greatest Story Ever Told (1965) – James the Younger
- Major Dundee (1965) – Tim Ryan
- The Sons of Katie Elder (1965) – Bud Elder
- The Glory Guys (1965) – Pvt. Martin Hale
- The Monroes (1966) – Clayt Monroe
- WUSA (1970) – Marvin
- The House That Would Not Die (1970) – Stan Whitman
- Hawaii Five-O Season 3 Episode "To Kill or Be Killed" (1971) – Michael Rigney
- The Last Movie (1971) – Mayor's Son
- In Search of America (TV Movie – 1971) – J.J.
- The Family Rico (TV Movie – 1972) – Georgie
- The Daughters of Joshua Cabe (TV Movie – 1972) – Cole Wetherall
- Coffee, Tea or Me? (TV Movie 1973) – Tommy Byrnes
- Hawaii Five-O Episode "Sunday Torch" (1973) – Ray Stokely; Episode "Nine Dragons" (1976) - Anthony Waring
- Evel Knievel (TV Movie – 1974) – Darrell Pettet
- Shootout in a One-Dog Town (1974) – Billy Boy
- Logan's Run (1976) – Doc
- Fantasy Island – TV serial, ep. "The Over-the-Hill Caper/Poof!You're a Movie Star" (1978)
- Nightkill (1980) – Lt. Donner
- The Martian Chronicles (TV Miniseries – 1980) – David Lustig
- The Million Dollar Face (TV Movie 1981)
- CHiPs (TV Series – 1981, Season 5 Episode 25) – Lucas
- Making of a Male Model (1983) – Sven
- Love Leads the Way: A True Story (TV Movie – 1984) – Hank
- Highway to Heaven (TV Series – 1986, Season 2 Episode 19) – Tom Ward
- Sunset Grill (1993) – Lt. Jeff Carruthers
- Dieppe (TV Movie – 1993) – David Lean
- Rent-a-Kid (1995) – Mr. Nicely
- Terminal Rush (1996) – Harrison Dekker
- Undue Influence (TV Movie – 1996) – Funeral Priest
- Elvis Meets Nixon (TV Movie – 1997) – Secret Service Agent #2
- Rescuers: Stories of Courage: Two Families (TV movie – 1998) – Lieutenant Von Meyer
