= The Wacky World of Dr. Morgus =

1962 American black and white horror film

- Poster
- Directed by: Roul Haig
- Release date: 1962
- Language: English

The Wacky World of Dr. Morgus is a 1962 American black and white horror film directed by Roul Haig. The cast includes Sid Noel (who created the title character for television), Dan Barton and David Kleinberger.

== Plot ==
Dr. Alexander Morgus, a New Orleans mad scientist, has created an instant people machine, capable of turning people into sand before restoring them to life. The ruler of an imaginary foreign country takes advantage of the device to elaborate a plan in order to spy on the United States.

== Title character ==
The 'real' Morgus was a local New Orleans horror host, presenting House of Shock on WWL-TV from 1959 to 1967 (and then sporadically until his death).

== Production ==
The Wacky World of Dr. Morgus was filmed on location in New Orleans, with additional shooting in Kiln, Mississippi, and Kenner, Louisiana.

The film was Haig's second and last film as a director, his first being Okefenokee in 1959. It was his third (and also last) contribution to cinema as a writer, this time with Noel Haig.

== Release ==
The film premiered in New Orleans on November 1, 1962. It was screened in the same city around Halloween 2010 as a sort of homage to its main protagonist.

== Reception ==
Retrospective commentators find that, more than a horror film, The Wacky World of Dr. Morgus is more accurately described as a "tongue-in-cheek Cold War spy thriller." The film has remained a cult classic, particularly in New Orleans.

Bill Warren reviewed the film in Keep Watching the Skies! American Science Fiction Movies of the Fifties, saying that the film "doesn't have a story so much as a parade of slightly linked incidents," and that the film's approach is "We'll do this for a while, then we'll do that." He sums up his assessment, "The Wacky World of Dr. Morgus is not influenced by other films, nor has it had any discernible effect on moviemaking. It's one of a kind, for which we should perhaps be grateful."
