= The Jeweller's Shop (film) =

- Italian: La bottega dell'orefice
- Directed by: Michael Anderson
- Written by: Jeff Andrus; Karol Wojtyla (play)
- Produced by: Mario Bregni; Pietro Bregni
- Starring: Burt Lancaster; Ben Cross; Olivia Hussey
- Cinematography: Franco Di Giacomo
- Edited by: Ron Wisman
- Music by: Michel Legrand
- Distributed by: Alliance Entertainment
- Release date: 19 December 1988 (Vatican City)
- Running time: 88 minutes
- Countries: Italy; Austria; Canada; Germany
- Language: English

The Jeweller's Shop (Italian: La bottega dell'orefice) is a 1988 Italian-Austrian-Canadian-German drama film based on The Jeweler's Shop, a play written by Karol Józef Wojtyła (Pope John Paul II) and scripted by Jeff Andrus, starring Burt Lancaster and Olivia Hussey, directed by Michael Anderson.

== Plot ==
In this romantic story The Jeweler (Burt Lancaster) sells wedding rings to a young couple and teaches them some precious truths about the meaning of love and marriage. The jeweller also helps another couple to fight for their troubled marriage, rebuilding their relationship. The reborn love between this second couple teaches their daughter that a loving marriage is possible, and she eventually accepts the marriage proposal from the first couple's son.

=== Act 1 - Signals ===
Andrew and Teresa are a young couple that have been friends for many years. A terrifying sound on a hike into the mountains with their priest, Fr. Adam, helps them to realize how much they mean to each other. The origin of the "signal" is never explained. Stefan meets Anna on that same hike and falls in love with her at first sight. Andrew later proposes to Teresa near to the town jeweler's shop, where they buy the wedding rings which symbolize their desire to be permanently united. Andrew and Teresa remain in Poland, where they are swept up in the tragedies of World War II; Stefan and Anna escape the war by emigrating to Canada.

=== Act 2 - The Bridegroom ===
Stefan and Anna are a couple in a troubled marriage where love does not seem to exist. Their lives are filled with emptiness and disillusionment. Anna goes to a jeweler's shop to sell her wedding ring, but the jeweler tells her it has no monetary value because her husband is still alive. She then meets the priest who had organized the trip to the mountains in Act 1 and opens her heart to him. The priest reminds her of the Parable of the Ten Virgins, and tells her to keep her lamp burning for the bridegroom.

=== Act 3 - The Children ===
Christopher (son of Andrew and Teresa) and Monica (daughter of Stefan and Anna) fall deeply in love and both reflect on the lives of their parents and how this has skewed their personal views of love and marriage.

Andrew has died in the war, when Christopher was two, leaving Christopher to fear the pain of losing love. Monica is afraid that marriage will not last because of her parents' troubled marriage.

== Cast ==
Actor	Role
Burt Lancaster	The Jeweler
Olivia Hussey	Thérèse
Ben Cross	Stephane
Jo Champa	Anna
Andrea Occhipinti	André
Daniel Olbrychski	Father Adam
Jonathan Crombie	Christophe
Melora Hardin	Monica
Paul Muller	Driver
Francesca Bregni	Liliana
