= Dan Raven =

Television series

- Genre: Police drama
- Starring: Skip Homeier; Dan Barton; Quinn Redeker
- Country of origin: United States
- Original language: English
- No. of seasons: 1
- No. of episodes: 13

Production
- Running time: 60 minutes
- Production company: Screen Gems

Original release
- Network: NBC
- Release: September 23, 1960 – January 6, 1961

Dan Raven is an American police drama that aired on NBC during the 1960–61 television season. It stars Skip Homeier and Dan Barton as Los Angeles County Sheriff's Department detectives whose beat is the Sunset Strip.

== Plot ==
Lieutenant Dan Raven is a Los Angeles County Sheriff's Department detective. He and his partner, Detective Sergeant Burke, work the night shift in the West Hollywood Division, where their beat is the Sunset Strip. The work brings them into frequent contact with celebrities such as singers, actors, and comedians. Perry Levitt is a magazine photographer working the Hollywood beat who frequently appears on the scene as Raven and Burke investigate crime in and around the many entertainment venues along the Strip.

== Cast ==
- Skip Homeier as Lieutenant Dan Raven
- Dan Barton as Detective Sergeant Burke
- Quinn Redeker as Perry Levitt

== Production ==
Screen Gems produced Dan Raven. It was the first starring role for Skip Homeier, a former child film star. The show′s setting along the Sunset Strip created an opportunity for the characters to engage with famous performers as guest stars each week. Some of the guest stars played themselves on the show, while others portrayed fictional characters. Mel Tormé, who appeared in episode 8 ("The Junket"), co-composed (with Stanley Styne and George Duning) and recorded for the show a song titled "(These) Desperate Hours".

== Broadcast history ==
Alex McNeill′s Total Television claims that the show premiered in a 30-minute format on January 23, 1960, airing on Saturdays, then expanded to a 60-minute format beginning with the broadcast of September 23, 1960, and numerous other sources repeat this claim. According to Brooks and Marsh′s Complete Directory to Prime Time Network and Cable TV Shows, however, the show premiered on September 23, 1960 and consisted only of 60-minute episodes. The 60-minute episodes on and after September 23, 1960, are well documented, but no source provides any information on any 30-minute episodes or any episodes broadcast prior to September 23, 1960.

The following list of episodes reflects the 60-minute episodes of Dan Raven. A total of 13 of these episodes ran from September 23, 1960, to January 6, 1961, broadcast on Fridays at 7:30 p.m. Eastern Time.

== Episodes ==
No.	Title	Original release date
1	"The High Cost of Fame"	September 23, 1960
While in Los Angeles for a singing engagement, singer and actor Bobby Darin is approached by an old friend who has fallen on hard times and tries to help him. But when a young woman is murdered, she dies screaming "Bobby!" — and her body is found next to an autographed picture of Darin. Bobby Darin plays himself in the episode. Other guest stars include Corey Allen, Richard Carlyle, Sue Ane Langdon, and Elaine Martone.
2	"The Mechanic"	September 30, 1960
A nightclub entertainer is in danger after he eavesdrops on the conversations of organized crime figures patronizing the club. Guest stars: Buddy Hackett and Eddie Ryder
3	"L.A. 46"	October 14, 1960
Alternative title "The Trade." Singer Paul Anka becomes the victim of an extortion scheme in which he is told that if does not pay up, someone will be killed. Paul Anka plays himself. Other guest stars include Bernard Fein, Joe di Reda, William Shaw and Mark Bailey.
4	"Penny"	October 28, 1960
Penny Murrow's husband blames her for his failure as a songwriter. Guest stars: Gogi Grant, Paul Richards, John Marley, and Diana Darrin.
5	"The Empty Frame"	November 4, 1960
After a woman's body is found in Hollywood Hills, the investigation into her death at first yields evidence that she had dated Raven and had committed suicide after he broke her heart. Evidence even begins to suggest that Raven may have killed her — but until her body was found, he had never even heard of her. Guest stars: William Leslie, Suzanne Storrs, Marian Collier, and Stanley Adams.
6	"The Night is Numbered"	November 11, 1960
The detectives suspect that a numerologist is committing murder to reaffirm his reputation as a seer. Singer and dancer Bob Crewe plays himself. Other guest stars include Kent Smith, Henry Corden, and Jon Lormer.
7	"Japanese Sandbag"	November 18, 1960
Mobsters kidnap Burke and use him as a hostage to protect a visiting organized crime leader from the police. Guest stars: Leo Gordon, Regis Theodore Marcuse, Valerie Starrett, and Steve Gravers.
8	"The Junket"	November 25, 1960
A hit singer′s brother is jealous of his success — and comes under suspicion in the murder of a disc jockey after he expresses an unusual amount of sorrow over the disc jockey's death. Actor Dick Whittinghill plays himself, and other guest stars include Mel Torme, Don Dubbins, and Ed Prentiss.
9	"Man on the Ledge"	December 2, 1960
A comedian is murdered at the same time that the detectives receive word that big-time organized crime figures are in town. Guest stars: Paul Winchell, Marty Ingles, Allen Pinson, Rita Lynn, and Frank Gerstle.
10	"Amateur Night"	December 9, 1960
Confusing phone calls cover a plan by four war veterans to rob a night club. Guest stars: Claude Akins, Marty Ingels, Jan Arvan, Sid Tomack, and Asa Maynor.
11	"Tinge of Red"	December 16, 1960
A scandal-bent editor blackmails glamorous nightclub singer June Carey over her politics. Guest stars: Julie London, John Craven, Gavin MacLeod, and Judson Pratt.
12	"The Satchel Man"	December 30, 1960
After stealing $250,000, a mobster tries to get out of town. Singer Paul Anka plays himself. Other guest stars include Parley Baer, Jocelyn Somers, Richard Bakalyan, and Marjorie Stapp.
13	"Buy a Nightmare"	January 6, 1961
Two drug addicts see a young girl as an easy target and rob her to get money for drugs. Guest stars: Harvey Lembeck, Tony Call, Adrienne Ellis, Claude Johnson, Paul Genge, and Don Haggerty.
