= Dan Barton =

American actor (1921–2009)

- Barton in Dan Raven, 1960
- Born: Daniel George Berman; September 20, 1921; Chicago, Illinois, U.S.
- Died: December 13, 2009 (aged 88); Sherman Oaks, California, U.S.
- Occupation: Actor
- Years active: 1940s–1983
- Spouses: Anne Barton (m. 1949; died 2000) Gyl Roland (m. 2005)
- Children: 2

Dan Barton (born Daniel George Berman; September 20, 1921 – December 13, 2009) was an American actor.

== Personal life ==
Barton was the son of Matthew and Sonia (née Koenigsberg) Berman. He was the cousin of Star Trek actor Walter Koenig. He graduated from Lake View High School and the school of speech at Northwestern University. At age 12, he began his lifelong acting career starting out in radio, averaging 15 shows a week as a child actor.

He served in the Army Special Services Entertainment Unit during World War II acting with Alex Nicol and Mickey Rooney. While stationed in Paris he edited a humor magazine. After returning to the States he was cast as Stefanowski in the stage play Mr. Roberts where he met actor Cliff Robertson who became his lifelong friend.

While on tour, Barton met actress Anne Barton (née Henderson), whom he later wed. They married between a matinee and evening performance. They had two children, musician Steve Barton from the band Translator and actress Susan Berman. In 2005, he married Gyl Roland, the daughter of actors Gilbert Roland and Constance Bennett.

== Career ==
In the late 1940s, Barton appeared on stage in a production of Mister Roberts alongside Cliff Robertson, Lee Van Cleef, John Forsythe and Brian Keith.

He had a long career in television from the 1950s through the 1980s, playing in a variety of different shows including Playhouse 90. He was cast as Jim Ellis, a schoolmaster in the episode "Incident at Indian Springs", of Cheyenne.

Barton portrayed Sergeant Burke in the NBC crime drama Dan Raven (1960-1961). Among other series in which he appeared were The Lone Ranger, Dick Powell's Zane Grey Theatre, Tales of Wells Fargo, 1957 Episode "Apache Gold" with Myron Healey and John Litel, Death Valley Days, Colgate Theatre, Bonanza, Barnaby Jones, The F.B.I., Ironside, The Bionic Woman, The Streets of San Francisco, The Rockford Files, Battlestar Galactica and Quincy, M.E. Barton also portrayed Earl Carnes, the character you loved to hate on NBC's Days of Our Lives.

In his later years, Barton was highly in demand as a voice-over talent. He narrated documentaries, worked in commercials and provided the voices for many characters in video games. He also spent several years recording books for the blind for The Braille Institute. He was the spokesman for Northrup Aviation for twelve years and did voice-over work for companies such as Coca-Cola, Kelloggs, Microsoft and Nike. Barton also was the voice in many political campaign commercials, including prominent Republicans Arnold Schwarzenegger and Elizabeth Dole, despite his own position as a lifelong Democrat.

== Death ==
On December 13, 2009, Barton died in Sherman Oaks, California, at the age of 88 from heart failure and kidney disease.

== Partial filmography ==
- Up Front (1951) - Doctor (uncredited)
- I'll See You in My Dreams (1951) - Hollywood Producer (uncredited)
- Sailor Beware (1952) - 'Bama
- The Jazz Singer (1952) - Ray Mullins
- Dream Wife (1953) - Sailor (uncredited)
- Playgirl (1954) - Man at Airport (uncredited)
- Return from the Sea (1954) - Sailor (uncredited)
- Francis Joins the WACS (1954) - Corporal MacDonald (uncredited)
- Conquest of Space (1955) - Crewman (uncredited)
- Away All Boats (1956) - Lt. Chesney (uncredited)
- No Time for Sergeants (1958) - Tiger (uncredited)
- Onionhead (1958) - Ens. Fineberg
- Perry Mason (1958) - Richard Wade - Episode "The Case of the Perjured Parrot"
- Colgate Theatre (1958) - Episode "If You Knew Tomorrow"
- The Wacky World of Dr. Morgus (1962) - Pencils McCane
- Captain America (1979) - Jeff Haden
