= Dominique (1979 film) =

1979 British film by Michael Anderson

- Original film poster
- Directed by: Michael Anderson
- Written by: Edward Abraham; Valerie Abraham
- Based on: "What Beckoning Ghost" by Harold Lawlor
- Produced by: Andrew Donally; Milton Subotsky
- Starring: Cliff Robertson; Jean Simmons; Jenny Agutter; Simon Ward; Ron Moody
- Cinematography: Ted Moore
- Edited by: Richard Best
- Music by: David Whitaker
- Production companies: Sword and Scorcery Productions; Barber Dann Films; Grand Prize Productions
- Distributed by: Scotia-Barber Distributors
- Release dates: 20 April 1979 (United States); 6 June 1979 (United Kingdom)
- Running time: 95 minutes
- Country: United Kingdom
- Language: English
- Budget: $1.2 million

Dominique, also released as Dominique Is Dead, is a 1979 British psychological horror film directed by Michael Anderson, and featuring Cliff Robertson, Jean Simmons, Simon Ward, Jenny Agutter, Judy Geeson, and Ron Moody. The film concerns a wealthy American businessman (Robertson) who is seemingly haunted by the ghost of his wife (Simmons), whom he apparently caused to commit suicide at their British estate. Author Ronald Chetwynd-Hayes wrote a novelization of the film, which is based on the 1948 short story "What Beckoning Ghost", written by American author Harold Lawlor.

This is the final movie of actors Jack Warner and Leslie Dwyer.

== Plot ==
David Ballard, a struggling American businessman in desperate need of money, devises a plan: using psychological manipulation, he can compel his rich English wife, Dominique, to commit suicide, thus enabling him to inherit her family's estate and assets. His plan seemingly works when Dominique's body is found hanging in her greenhouse, but David soon finds himself being haunted by what he believes is Dominique's vengeful ghost. His sanity weakens gradually as he finds himself unable to rid himself of his wife's spirit, until he finally falls to his death while trying to escape from her.

As a twist ending, the "ghost" is revealed to have been his half-sister, Ann, who had enlisted the help of the man she loves, Tony Calvert, who had come to work as the Ballards' chauffeur and ingratiated himself with Dominique before her death. Using her experience from a past career as an actress, Ann had employed elaborate special effects and makeup to fake Dominique's ghost, get rid of David and claim David's share of the family fortune for herself, while Tony, being the only person Dominique trusted, agreed to help her in return for his own sizable cut.

However, Tony then rejects Ann and plays her an audio recording that reveals that the real Dominique had actually been alive, and part of the plan, until they had killed her to avoid detection; the recording made it seem that Ann had concocted the entire plan without Tony's knowledge. Tony admits that he intends to keep the recording to enforce Ann's silence, and that he had always intended to take his share and leave her. Ann murders him with a revolver the couple had previously used as part of their deception, with the movie ending as Ann stands over Tony's corpse.

== Cast ==
- Cliff Robertson as David Ballard
- Jean Simmons as Dominique Ballard
- Simon Ward as Tony Calvert
- Jenny Agutter as Ann Ballard
- Ron Moody as Dr. Rogers
- Judy Geeson as Marjorie Craven
- Michael Jayston as Arnold Craven
- Flora Robson as Mrs. Davis
- David Tomlinson as Lawyer
- Jack Warner as George
- Leslie Dwyer as Cemetery Supervisor
- Jan Holden as Ballard's Secretary
- Jack McKenzie as John, 1st Chauffeur
- Michael Nightingale as Vicar at Funeral

== Production ==
Producer Milton Subotsky originally offered the title role to Lee Remick, but Jean Simmons was cast after Remick declined.

Filming started in England during September 1977 and lasted six weeks. The film was initially intended to be shot in Canada, but this was changed after an offer was made for filming in England with a greater budget at Shepperton Studios.

== Release ==
Dominique was released in the United States in the spring of 1979, opening regionally in Fresno and Merced, California on 20 April 1979. It premiered in London on 6 June 1979 with subsequent screenings in England.

After a very brief theatrical playing, it was distributed more widely by cable broadcastings.

=== Home media ===
Vinegar Syndrome released the film on DVD and Blu-ray in 2019. As of 2025, this release is out of print.

== Reception ==
Martyn Auty criticized the movie in the Monthly Film Bulletin as "heavy handed". Pop Matters reviewed the movie in 2019, writing that it "won’t raise the hackles of anyone looking for deep scares, but it is an absorbing suspense-drama that will at least keep you in your seat, if not the edge of it". Variety deemed the film an "unsatisfying British mystery thriller."

In a retrospective assessment, writer John Kenneth Muir described the film as "low-key, methodical, ambiguous, and only mildly jolting."

Despite its mixed critical reception, actress Jean Simmons cited Dominique as one of her best films.

== Sources ==
- Bawden, James; Miller, Ron (2023). They Made the Movies: Conversations with Great Filmmakers. Lexington, Kentucky: University Press of Kentucky. ISBN 978-0-813-19754-8.
- Bryce, Allan (2000). Amicus: The Studio That Dripped Blood. Liskeard, Cornwall: Stray Cat Publishing. ISBN 978-0-953-32613-6.
- Capua, Michelangelo (2022). Jean Simmons: Her Life and Career. Jefferson, North Carolina: McFarland. ISBN 978-1-476-64535-3.
- Muir, John Kenneth (2007). Horror Films of the 1970s. Jefferson, North Carolina: McFarland. ISBN 978-0-786-49156-8.
- Smith, Gary A. (2018) [2000]. Uneasy Dreams: The Golden Age of British Horror Films, 1956-1976. Jefferson, North Carolina: McFarland. ISBN 978-0-7864-0604-3.
