= Destination 60,000 =

1957 film

- Theatrical poster
- Directed by: George Waggner
- Written by: George Waggner
- Produced by: Jack J. Gross; Philip N. Krasne
- Starring: Preston Foster; Coleen Gray; Pat Conway; Jeff Donnell
- Cinematography: Hal McAlpin
- Edited by: Kenneth G. Crane
- Music by: Albert Glasser
- Production company: Allied Artists Pictures
- Distributed by: Allied Artists Pictures
- Release date: May 12, 1957
- Running time: 65 minutes
- Country: United States
- Language: English

Destination 60,000 (aka Jet) is a 65-minute 1957 drama film, directed by George Waggner and produced by the Allied Artists Pictures . The film stars Preston Foster, Pat Conway and Jeff Donnell. Destination 60,000 depicts the life of test pilots flying the fastest experimental supersonic fighter designs from Edwards Air Force Base. (Note: Edwards Air Force Base is the premier flight test center for experimental aircraft in the United States.)

== Plot ==
A new experimental aircraft, "The Dream" is the pride of the Buckley Aircraft Corporation. Owner Colonel Ed Buckley (Preston Foster), has designed and built a prototype that his former wartime flying buddy, Jeff Connors (Pat Conway), wants to fly. Buckley's wife Ruth likes Jeff, who is godfather to their son "Skip" (Bobby Clark). Test flying is dangerous work, and Jeff has to learn how to fly to supersonic speeds, coached by Mickey Hill (Denver Pyle). Ed's secretary, Mary Ellen (Coleen Gray), is another reason for Jeff to want to join the company.

Although Mickey is scheduled to do the first test, his wife Grace (Anne Barton) is expecting, so Ed assigns Jeff. "The Dream" is carried to altitude by a Boeing B-29/P2B mothership before being released to fly on its own power. When Jeff tries to ignite the rocket motors, the aircraft explodes. but he ejects using an escape pod, landing safely. Suspected of somehow being responsible for the explosion, he is placed on a 30-day suspension, but Jeff protests and quits. With his partner Dan Maddox (Russell Thorson), Ed constructs a second prototype, with Mickey as the test pilot.

A repeat of the same explosion lands Mickey in the hospital. He had blacked out, but the automatic escape pod had deployed, saving his life. In a visit to the hospital where he sees Ed, Jeff asks to come back, claiming he will serve his suspension while a new aircraft is being built. With his company's fortunes at a low ebb, Ed believes he has the answer to the violent explosions and elects to fly the next test himself. Jeff accompanies him. "The Dream" climbs to 60,000 feet, then Ed cuts the motors and reignites them successfully, but blacks out. Jeff sends out a Mayday, shouting, "Bandits at two o'clock." Like he had in wartime, Ed instinctively reacts and pulls out of the dive. With the test a success and the company again in good shape, Ed and Jeff land safely and return to Ruth and Mary, who are waiting for them.

== Cast ==
- Preston Foster as Col. Ed Buckley
- Pat Conway as Pat Connors
- Jeff Donnell as Ruth Buckley
- Coleen Gray as Mary Ellen
- Bobby Clark as "Skip" Buckley
- Denver Pyle as Mickey Hill
- Russell Thorson as Dan Maddox
- Anne Barton as Grace Hill

== Production ==
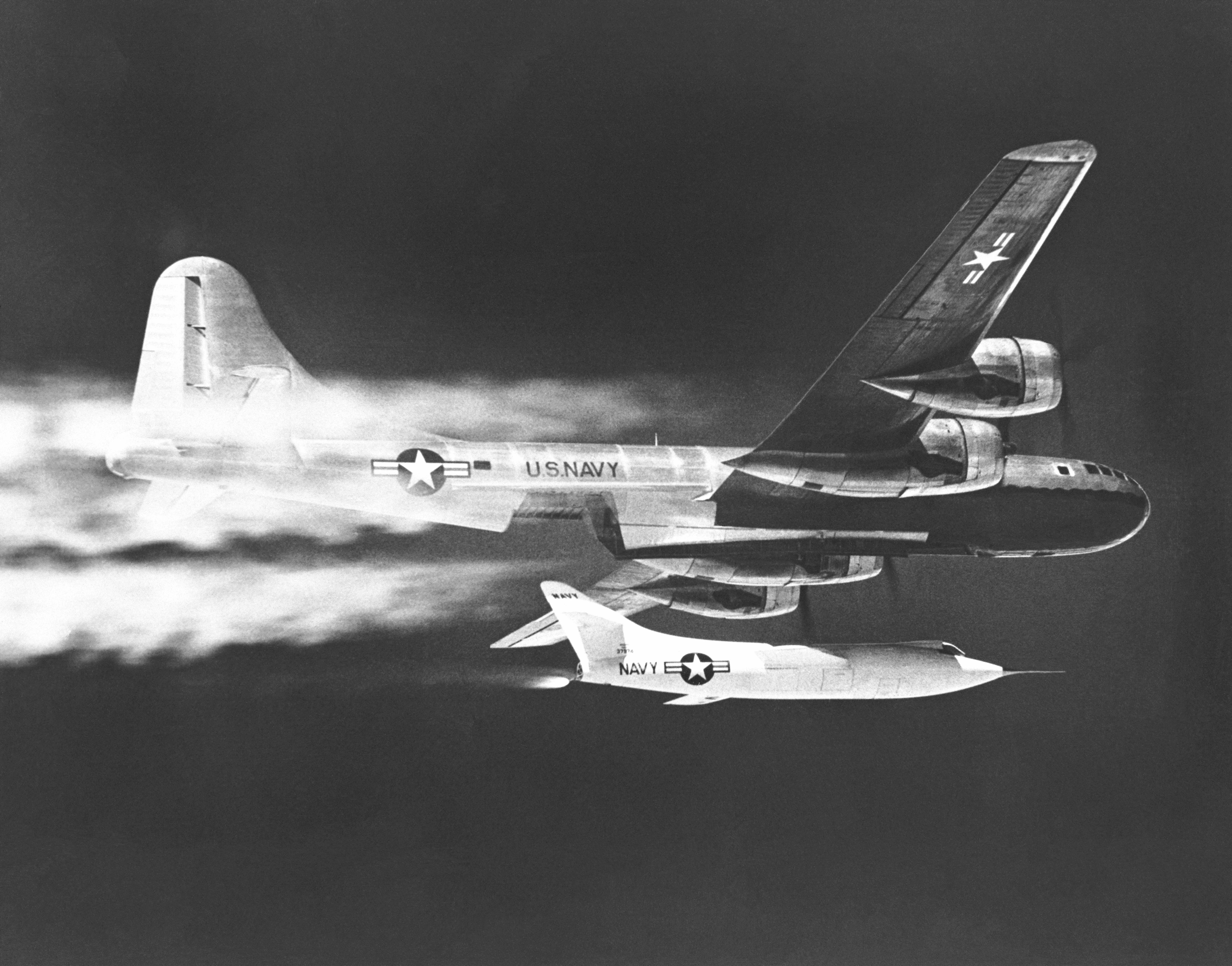
The Douglas Skyrocket dropped from a US Navy P2B mothership was featured prominently in Destination 60,000.

Destination 60,000 has the feel of a docudrama, weaving a fictional story into a depiction of the brave test pilots flying the Douglas D-558-2 Skyrocket. Principal photography began in mid-August 1956 at California Studios. Full cooperation from the Douglas Aircraft Company was acknowledged. The ability to film at Edwards Air Force Base also enhanced the "first-hand" descriptions.

== Reception ==
Destination 60,000 was primarily a B film, "one of a cycle of late-1950s films dealing with the exploits of supersonic-jet test pilots. ... Destination 60,000 was put together by Gross-Krasne Productions, a firm more closely associated with weekly TV series (Big Town, Dr. Hudson's Secret Journal, Mayor of the Town, etc.)."

== See also ==
- List of American films of 1957
