= Figures in a Landscape (film) =

1970 film directed by Joseph Losey

- Directed by: Joseph Losey
- Screenplay by: Robert Shaw
- Based on: Figures in a Landscape (1968 novel) by Barry England
- Produced by: John Kohn
- Starring: Robert Shaw; Malcolm McDowell
- Cinematography: Henri Alekan; Guy Tabary; Peter Suschitzky
- Edited by: Reginald Beck
- Music by: Richard Rodney Bennett
- Production companies: Cinecrest Films Ltd. Cinema Center Films
- Distributed by: 20th Century Fox (UK); National General Pictures (US)
- Release dates: 14 July 1970 (San Sebastián); 19 November 1970 (UK); 18 July 1971 (US)
- Running time: 110 minutes
- Country: United Kingdom; United States
- Language: English

Figures in a Landscape is a 1970 action thriller film directed by Joseph Losey, based on the 1968 novel by Barry England. It stars Robert Shaw (who also wrote the screenplay) and Malcolm McDowell. The minimalist narrative follows two fugitives in an unspecified locale, who are relentlessly pursued by a black helicopter.

A British and American co-production, the film premiered at the 1970 San Sebastián International Film Festival, and was released theatrically on 19 November. It was nominated for Best Original Music at the 24th British Academy Film Awards.

== Plot ==
Two men run across a beach at dawn with their hands tied behind their backs. After several shots of a helicopter frantically searching the landscape, it becomes apparent that the two men are escapees of some kind. It is later revealed that their names are MacConnachie and Ansell. The two continue running across barren land, trying to escape the sight of the helicopter. MacConnachie continuously berates Ansell as they run, showing that he is the leader, more or less.

The duo eventually get away from the helicopter and find a goat herder. MacConnachie sneaks up and kills him hoping to find any useful supplies, but does not find anything. The action, however, greatly upsets Ansell. They continue on through harsh terrain, sometimes being found by the helicopter, but they manage to escape again.

One night, they come across a small town. They sneak through, and get into a house, where the only inhabitant is a lonely widow sitting in a chair next to the bed of her presumably deceased husband. She doesn't seem to notice they are there, but she does however seem to be guarding a basket of bread. The two ignore her and loot the house, finding many supplies and even a rifle. While Ansell prepares to leave, MacConnachie takes a piece of bread from the woman's basket, causing her to drop out of her trance and scream, causing them to flee as the townspeople are alarmed. At the town limits, Ansell tells MacConnachie that he wants to continue travelling with him, which is against MacConnachie's idea of splitting up. He eventually consents and the two continue on. Ansell reveals that he formerly worked at Fortnum & Mason, in London.

They come across the helicopter again in the mountains. They make a plan for Ansell to lure the helicopter close while MacConnachie shoots its gas tank in order to destroy it. Ansell exposes himself to distract it, but instead of shooting the gas tank, MacConnachie shoots the observer in the helicopter's passenger seat, who falls out. Ansell protests, but MacConnachie tells him that he did it to show power over the helicopter and to avoid injuring Ansell in a possible explosion. They also find a sub machine gun with the observer's dead body.

After being pursued by ground troops through a field, they then come across a military compound where the helicopter goes to refuel. They try to sneak through in the dark, but are spotted and forced to fight and escape, in the process shooting up the parked helicopter. They continue travelling across a mountain range afterwards where the ice is melting.

Eventually, they arrive at a snow peaked mountain, which seems to be what they were searching for the entire trip. At the top there is a military post, presumably at the border, and several soldiers who come out to greet them. Ansell is overjoyed and runs out to them, though MacConnachie hears a kind of noise from behind him, which is the helicopter. Before joining Ansell, he decides to stage a last stand battle between himself and the helicopter. Despite shooting it many times, the helicopter fires at MacConnachie, killing him. Ansell feels remorse, but eventually returns with the soldiers to the compound.

== Cast ==
- Robert Shaw as MacConnachie
- Malcolm McDowell as Ansell
- Pamela Brown as the Widow
- Henry Woolf as Helicopter pilot
- Christopher Malcolm as Helicopter observer
- Andrew Bradford, Warwick Sims, Roger Lloyd-Pack, Robert East, and Tariq Yunus as Soldiers

Shaw and McDowell are the only credited members of the cast.

== Production ==
During pre-production, many of the film's crew were replaced, such as Peter Medak as director and Stanley Mann as screenwriter, with Peter O'Toole attached to star. According to Joseph Losey, he was hired because the producers wanted a more experienced director.

At the time of filming, Robert Shaw was a quite well known star, whereas Malcolm McDowell was still relatively unknown as it was made in the period after If.... but before A Clockwork Orange. Shaw says he was paid $500,000 to do the film.

The film was shot in the Sierra Nevada mountains of Granada, Spain. Filming took place four months, between June and October 1969.

The helicopter featured, an Aérospatiale Alouette II, XZ-2B2, based at Armilla, Granada, was flown by Gilbert Chomat.

== Release ==
The film premiered at the 1970 San Sebastián International Film Festival. It was released in the United Kingdom by 20th Century Fox on 19 November 1970, and in the United States by National General Pictures on 18 July 1971.

== Reception ==
=== Critical response ===
The New York Times critic Vincent Canby confers more accolades on Losey's "magnificently photogenic, unidentified landscape" than on its allegorical elements- evidenced by his effort to "upgrade a genre movie by giving it an intellect". Indeed, in this "stunningly realized adventure", where the protagonists appear as metaphoric "Everyman" figures, the landscape itself provides as much drama as the interpersonal struggles of the two fugitives.

Critic Roger Greenspun at the New York Times dismisses Figures in a Landscape as a "failed allegory".

=== Awards and nominations ===
Ceremony	Category	Nominee	Result	Ref.
24th British Academy Film Awards	Best Original Music	Richard Rodney Bennett	Nominated	

== Style ==
Critic Foster Hirsch considers Figures in a Landscape a "visual tour-de-force" in which Losey employs tracking shots, aerial long shots, and circular pans to convey the sense of impending doom of the two men trapped in a vast natural landscape.

Losey makes use of striking visual contrasts between long-shot and closeup; between movement and stasis; between long takes and Eisensteinian fragmentation. Sound is also used to deepen the dramatic tension—"as varied and as kinetic as the camera movement".

Hirsch adds: "Sometimes sounds are used for shock effect...there are startling contrasts between sound and an utter, piercing silence. The dissonant, sparingly used score by Richard Rodney Bennett further underlines the film's fatalistic worldview."

== Theme ==
Losey's films are void of "old fashioned" heroes, and anti-heroes. All the protagonists are subject to "menacing social realities" that threaten to crush any act of rebellion. The image of the helicopter appears in Losey's films as an oppressive instrument of the political establishment. Biographer Hirsch writes:

[T]he image of the political world that appears in many of his films is evocatively symbolized in the hovering, omnipresent helicopter that relentlessly pursues and finally overtakes the escaped prisoners in Figures in the Landscape.

Hirsch adds: "Political society in Losey always contains potential violence and the threat of annihilation."

== Footnotes ==
=== Sources ===
- Canby, Vincent (19 July 1971). "Screen: Figures in a Landscape Bows: Losey Work Appears at Festival Theater Robert Shaw, Malcolm McDowell Are Stars"". The New York Times.
- Greenspun, Roger (14 October 1972). "Film Fete: Assassination of Trotsky". The New York Times.
- Hirsch, Foster (1980). Joseph Losey. Boston, Massachusetts: Twayne Publishers. ISBN 0-8057-9257-0.
- Palmer, James; Riley, Michael (1993). The Films of Joseph Losey. Cambridge, England: Cambridge University Press. ISBN 0-521-38386-2.
