= The Martian Chronicles (miniseries) =

Scifi mini-series

- Based on: The Martian Chronicles by Ray Bradbury
- Screenplay by: Richard Matheson
- Directed by: Michael Anderson
- Starring: Rock Hudson; Roddy McDowall; Maria Schell
- Composer: Stanley Myers
- Countries of origin: United States; United Kingdom
- No. of episodes: 3 (list of episodes)

Production
- Producers: Milton Subotsky; Andrew Donally
- Running time: 98 min each episode (without commercials)

Original release
- Release: 27 January – 29 January 1980

The Martian Chronicles is a 1980 television three-episode miniseries based on Ray Bradbury's 1950 book The Martian Chronicles and dealing with the exploration of Mars and the inhabitants there. The series starred Rock Hudson, Darren McGavin, Bernadette Peters, Roddy McDowall, Fritz Weaver, Barry Morse, and Maria Schell. It was aired on NBC in January 1980 in three episodes with a total running time of just over four hours (nearly five hours on the DVD version). The series depicts Mars as having a "thin atmosphere" which humans can breathe, with water-filled canals and desert-like vegetation. The miniseries was directed by Michael Anderson and written by Richard Matheson.

== Episodes ==
=== The Expeditions ===
Episode 1, 27 January 1980

The first episode starts at the scene of Viking 1 uncrewed probe landing on the surface of the planet Mars in July 1976. A narrator explains that the purpose of the probe is to determine whether Mars is inhabited. As the narrator is speaking, the viewer becomes aware that there are two viewpoints at NASA amongst the scientists who launched the probe: One group obviously believes Mars is uninhabited, the other is open to the possibility of indigenous life on the planet. Each has its convincing arguments, but ultimately the probe indicates that Mars does not harbor life. At the close of the scene the camera pans back to show a larger view of the probe's landing area, with what appears to be indigenous Martian settlements in the surrounding terrain, with the narrator noting that, "If the probe had landed just a few miles further on, things might have been different." Afterwards the opening credits roll.

The next scene places the viewer at the Kennedy Space Center in January 1999 when the first "Zeus I" crewed spacecraft to Mars is carried into orbit by a Saturn V rocket. The Zeus project represents the beginning of a major effort by NASA and NATO to explore and eventually colonize the outer planets.

On Mars, Ylla (a Martian woman trapped in a loveless marriage) dreams of the coming astronauts through telepathy. Her husband, though he pretends to deny the reality of the dreams, becomes bitterly jealous, sensing his wife's confused romantic feelings for one of the astronauts. He kills the two-man expedition, astronauts Nathaniel York and Bert Conover, as soon as they arrive. Mission control on Earth does not know the fate of the crew, and one of the senior astronauts Jeff Spender urges the project director Col. John Wilder to abandon the Zeus project because of concerns that Mars may already harbor life. Wilder (who has shepherded the project for ten years) refuses, among other things because he believes mankind might escape environmental pollution and war on Earth by colonizing Mars instead.

A second mission is launched and the "Zeus II" crew lands on Mars in April 2000. To their amazement the crew (astronauts Arthur Black, Sam Hinkston, and David Lustig) discover that they have landed in a town that looks exactly like Green Bluff, Illinois, circa 1979. They are warmly greeted by close relatives and loved ones who all died years ago. In fact, the Martians use the memories of the astronauts to lure them into their old homes, where they are killed in the middle of the night.

A third mission, "Zeus III", lands on Mars in June 2001. It is commanded by Col. Wilder himself with five other astronauts (Spender, Parkhill, Briggs, Cook, McClure) as subordinates. The crew discovers five ancient cities in the vicinity of the spacecraft, one of which apparently was inhabited only a few weeks ago. The scientists find that all of the Martians have died of chicken pox accidentally brought from Earth by the first two Zeus crews. The men, except for the archaeologist Spender and Colonel Wilder, break out the alcohol rations and begin to celebrate their successful landing, becoming more boisterous. When Briggs starts dropping empty wine bottles into a clear blue canal, Spender loses his temper and punches him into the canal. He leaves the rest of the landing party to explore Martian ruins; when he returns, he is in possession of a Martian weapon and acting strangely. He kills the other astronauts except for Parkhill and Wilder, who shoots Spender in the chest before he has the opportunity to kill them as well.

=== The Settlers ===
Episode 2, 28 January 1980

In the second episode, Wilder returns to the Red Planet in February 2004 with an entire fleet of spaceships, having been appointed director of the American colonization of Mars. In six months, a dozen communities are laid down. These sites, named after the Zeus mission astronauts, include: "York Plain," "Blackville," "Wilder Mountain," "Spender Hill," "Briggs Canal," and "Lustig Creek." The colonies grow rapidly over the next two years with varying amounts of success, as the colonists bring the vices of Earth (greed, corruption, bureaucracy) with them.

In September 2006, the Martian colonists start to encounter strange phenomena. A pair of newly-arrived missionaries, Father Peregrine and Father Stone, are rescued from a landslide by a group of mysterious blue lights. Father Stone wants to return to First Town, but Father Peregrine insists on seeking out the blue lights; when he leaves his sleeping companion and climbs to the top of a cliff and steps off, one of them appears and saves him again. They reveal themselves to be incorporeal Martians from over 250 million years ago who live in the hills, supposedly at one with God. They tell Father Peregrine, who has vowed to build a church in the hills with a blue sphere in place of a cross, to return to his own people and minister to them.

David Lustig, presumed dead six years ago with the rest of Earth's Second Expedition to Mars, returns to his colonist parents in Lustig Creek. He expresses an intense aversion to visiting First Town, the chief colony on Mars; when his parents insist on going there anyway, he suddenly goes missing.

Father Peregrine later sees a vision of Jesus Christ in his church in First Town, but the vision begs for release: "I am not what I seem! I am not that vision!" Peregrine realizes that his visitor is actually a Martian who is forced to appear as anyone that others have strong thoughts of: David Lustig, Jesus, Lavinia Spaulding (the lost daughter of another settler couple), etc. The Martian is discovered, pursued and eventually surrounded by the residents of First Town, each of whom sees and wants him to be someone different. Under telepathic pressure to be everyone to everyone simultaneously, he dies and his body disappears. Meanwhile, nuclear war is imminent on Earth. Congress cuts the budget for space exploration, all flights to Mars are cancelled, and the colony is evacuated.

The final segment of the episode focuses on Sam Parkhill, the only survivor (aside from Wilder) of the third Zeus mission. He has opened a diner on Mars with his wife, intending to serve future truckers and mine workers. When a lone Martian suddenly appears in the diner, Parkhill panics and shoots him. Numerous Martians appear in sand ships, and Parkhill takes his wife to his very own sand ship and flees. Parkhill manages to shoot several more of them, but the Martians eventually catch up and surround the couple's ship. To Parkhill's great surprise, they bear him no ill will; in fact, they give him a land grant to half of Mars and a message: "The night is tonight. Prepare." Unfortunately, the expected fleet of ten thousand rockets filled with one hundred thousand "hungry customers" will not be coming; instead, as Parkhill views Earth through a telescope, he sees it destroyed in nuclear fire.

=== The Martians ===
Episode 3, 29 January 1980

As established at the end of the second episode, Mars was evacuated shortly before a worldwide nuclear war terminated all life on Earth. Wilder travels back to Earth in November 2006 in the hope he can rescue his brother and his family. He returns to the Zeus project mission control facility but discovers a video recording the deaths of everyone, including his brother, when enemy neutron bombs detonated nearby.

Meanwhile, Peter Hathaway has retired on Mars with his wife, Alice, and daughter, Margarite. A mechanical tinkerer, Hathaway has wired an abandoned town below his house to sound alive at night with noise and phone calls. One night, Hathaway sights a rocket in orbit and puts on a laser light show to signal the rocket.

Only a few scattered humans remain on Mars. One of them is Benjamin Driscoll, the lone inhabitant of First Town. One day, as he wanders around the abandoned settlement, he hears a telephone ringing. Initially confused, he soon realizes it is an opportunity for companionship. After breaking into a home just in time to miss another call, Driscoll sits down with a phone book of Mars and starts dialing at A. After days of no answers, he changes his strategy and starts calling hotels; then, guessing where he thinks a woman would most likely spend her time, he calls the biggest beauty salon on Mars, in New Texas City. When a woman answers, he flies 1,500 miles to New Texas City to meet her.

Genevieve Selsor turns out to be thoroughly narcissistic and entirely obsessed with her own good looks. Driscoll asks her out on a date, during which she reveals that she decided to stay behind simply because "they wouldn't let me take all my clothes with me back to Earth." She enjoys having access to all the clothes, makeup, footwear, and so forth in New Texas City without having to pay for anything. At the same time, she laments that she has to do all the cooking and technical maintenance herself. She rejects Driscoll's advances but still expects him to make a nice breakfast while repairing her sauna. This is a significant departure from the original 1950 short story, "Silent Towns", in which Selsor is not self-absorbed and expectant of Driscoll's labor; instead, she is overweight, sticky with chocolate and desires to watch movies. The male character (named Walter Gripp in the original) finds her too expectant and clingy, as she shows Gripp her ideal wedding dress. In both versions of the story, Gripp/Driscoll decides that solitude is preferable to her continued company and abandons her.

Hathaway at first he thinks his attempt has failed, but the rocket returns to land. It carries Father Stone and Colonel Wilder, who have returned from Earth. They reunite with Hathaway, who is troubled by his heart when they break the news of Earth's nuclear destruction, but brings the crew to his house for breakfast. Wilder remarks that Alice looks just as she was as when he last saw her, at their wedding. After breakfast, Wilder explores the surrounding area, particularly some headstones he saw earlier. He returns, pale, having learned that Hathaway's wife and daughter died in July 2000 from an unknown virus.

As the Hathaways toast their guests, Peter Hathaway's heart finally fails. As he dies, he begs Wilder not to call his family because they "would not understand." Wilder then confirms that Alice and Margarite are robots built by Hathaway to replace the dead originals. Wilder and Stone depart, and the robots continue with their meaningless daily rituals until the chance arrival of Ben Driscoll. The Hathaway robots appear relieved when Driscoll decides to stay with them.

In March 2007, Wilder visits Sam Parkhill again to inform him that the Earth has been destroyed and Mars is all they have left. Parkhill tells him about the "land grant" that he received from the Martians. Wilder suspects that the Martians were somehow aware of the coming war. He comes to the conclusion that the Martians desired to give the other half of their own desolate planet away to the survivors of the Earth colony, such that each surviving civilization could develop once more.

Traveling the wastes alone by night, Wilder has a long-wished-for encounter with a Martian. Each sees the Mars he is accustomed to: Wilder sees ruins, while the Martian sees a living city with a festival in progress. Each seems to be an immaterial phantom to the other. Neither knows if he precedes the other in time, as they each argue that the other resides in the distant past. Despite this, they manage to come to an accord, with the Martian explaining what he can of their way of life before he and Wilder part as friends. Wilder then takes his family into the ruins of a Martian city, saying that they will live there and learn the Martian way. The first night, he burns copies of "Capital" and "The Wealth of Nations." After promising his family that they will get to see real Martians, he points at their reflection in a pool of water and declares, "Those are the Martians". Finally, he pushes a button on his remote control to blow up the last remaining rocketship which could return them to Earth.

== Cast ==
=== Main ===
- Rock Hudson as Colonel John Wilder
- Gayle Hunnicutt as Ruth Wilder
- Bernie Casey as Major Jeff Spender
- Christopher Connelly as Ben Driscoll
- Nicholas Hammond as Captain Arthur Black
- Roddy McDowall as Father Stone
- Darren McGavin as Sam Parkhill
- Bernadette Peters as Genevieve Selsor
- Maria Schell as Anna Lustig
- Joyce Van Patten as Elma Parkhill
- Fritz Weaver as Father Peregrine

=== Recurring ===
- Linda Lou Allen as Marilyn
- Michael Anderson Jr. as David Lustig
- Robert Beatty as General Halstead
- James Faulkner as Mr K
- Jon Finch as Jesus Christ
- Terence Longdon as Martian
- Barry Morse as Peter Hathaway
- Nyree Dawn Porter as Alice Hathaway
- Wolfgang Reichmann as Leif Lustig
- Maggie Wright as Ylla
- John Cassady as Briggs
- Alison Elliott as Lavinia Spalding
- Vadim Glowna as Sam Hinkston
- Richard Heffer as Conover
- Derek Lamden as Martian
- Peter Marinker as McClure
- Richard Oldfield as Captain Nathaniel York
- Anthony Pullen Shaw as Edward Black
- Burnell Tucker as Bill Wilder
- Laurie Holden as Marie Wilder (uncredited)
- Estelle Brody as Mrs Black (uncredited)
- Phil Brown as Mr Black (uncredited)

== Production ==
=== Filming ===
The series was filmed at Shepperton Studios in England and on both the Mediterranean island of Malta and Lanzarote in the Canary Islands.

== Soundtrack ==
In 2002, the Airstrip One Company in association with MGM Music, released a 3000 copy, limited edition 36 track soundtrack CD of the original Stanley Myers score recorded in 1979. This release, still available from rare Film & TV soundtrack specialists, includes a comprehensive 18-page full color and fully illustrated booklet which details various aspects of the making of this mini-series. The catalogue number of this CD is AOD 003. The CD comprises the full miniseries soundtrack, with a notable exception: the track the Silver Locusts recorded is a shorter, completely different piece than the version that was aired. Also, the soundtrack is missing a few incidental electronic music passages. This omission is acknowledged in the CD liner notes which indicate that additional electronic music by Richard Harvey has not been included in the soundtrack.

== Reception ==
Ray Bradbury described the miniseries as "just boring."

== References in other works ==
Electronic musician Biosphere sampled the conversation between Martian woman Ylla (Maggie Wright) and her husband, Mr. K (James Faulkner), from episode 1, The Expeditions, in his song "The Third Planet."

== See also ==
- List of films set on Mars
