= Andrew Donally =

British film producer

Andrew Donally (1924–1991) was a British film producer. He worked for a number of years with Irving Allen.

== Filmography ==
- A Matter of Life and Death (1946) - support team
- High Treason (1951) - assistant
- Curtain Up (1952) -assistant
- Hammerhead (1968) - associate producer
- The Desperados (1969) - associate producer
- Run Wild, Run Free (1969) - executive producer
- Cromwell (1970) - associate producer
- Nicholas and Alexandra (1971) - associate producer
- Psychomania (1973) - producer
- The Golden Voyage of Sinbad (1973) - production executive
- Summer Wishes, Winter Dreams (1973) - unit manager
- The Internecine Project (1974) - producer
- Conduct Unbecoming (1975) - producer
- Sinbad and the Eye of the Tiger (1977) - associate producer
- Dominique (1979) - producer
- The Martian Chronicles (1980) (miniseries) - producer
- Priest of Love (1981) - producer
- Gossip (1982) - producer
- The Zany Adventures of Robin Hood (1984) (TV film) - producer
