= Morgus the Magnificent =

Fictional character

Morgus the Magnificent, also known as Momus Alexander Morgus, is a fictional character created and portrayed by actor Sidney Noel Rideau (aka Sid Noel). From the late 1950s into the 1980s, Morgus was a "horror host" of late-night science fiction and horror movies and television shows that originated in the New Orleans, Louisiana market. Morgus is a quintessential mad scientist, assisted by executioner-styled sidekick, Chopsley (Tommy George). Morgus' well-intentioned experiments often served as book-end pieces to the late-night films being shown, and typically went awry at the last minute.

== Sidney Noel Rideau ==
A native of New Orleans, Sidney Noel Rideau (aka Sid Noel; December 25, 1929 - August 27, 2020) attended broadcasting school and worked for radio station WWEZ-AM before joining WSMB-AM in 1956. While at WSMB, Rideau led a vocal group that recorded a novelty song called “Humpty Dump” with Atlantic Records. While Rideau was working as a disc jockey at WWL (AM) radio in 1958, he auditioned for a job hosting the new WWL-TV show, House of Shock. Rideau was awarded the job, and agreed to do it "only if he could make the show funny". He created and performed as the host character "Doctor Morgus", however Rideau did not want to reveal his real-life identity. According to Rideau, "being Morgus brought with it some challenges to say the least". For approximately 50 years, Rideau tried to keep his identity private, and reportedly didn't even tell his children he was Morgus.

== Show history ==
Morgus first appeared on late night television on January 3, 1959, in the House of Shock that aired on WWL-TV in New Orleans, hosting science fiction and horror movies "in between experiments". The set was styled to look like an upstairs garret supposedly located over the old city ice house, with a fire escape exit into Pirate's Alley in the old French Quarter.

=== Move to Detroit ===
In 1963, Rideau moved to Detroit, Michigan, joining WJBK-TV. Starting that November, Morgus was seen six times a week, showing horror movies on Morgus Presents Sunday nights, as well as hosting a five-minute-long weathercast at 5:55pm each weekday. (The actual weather report, shown on a screen that resembled a slot machine, took up only 30 seconds of Morgus' show, with a one-minute commercial and the rest of the program featuring the host's mad scientist antics.) The show was initially popular enough to also be seen in Atlanta (with other cities like Milwaukee, Cleveland and Toledo, Ohio also mentioned as possible outlets), but declining ratings caused WJBK to let Morgus go by the end of 1964. Rideau moved across the street to WXYZ-TV in January 1965, hosting "Shock Theatre" on Sunday and Friday nights, but by April he was on his way back down south.

=== Return to New Orleans ===
In mid-1965, Rideau and Morgus Presents (aka ‘’Morgus The Magnificent’’) returned to New Orleans on WWL-TV and remained on the air for two years. Morgus Presents reappeared as an afternoon show in 1970 on WDSU-TV, but was discontinued in 1971. After another long hiatus, Morgus Presents returned in January 1987, on WGNO-TV. Long-time New Orleans television director and Morgus collaborator, Paul Yacich, directed all fifty-two episodes. By 2005, Morgus Presents had gone into syndication and aired on various stations, such as Cox Cable channel 10, and WVUE Fox 8 in New Orleans.

When Hurricane Katrina hit New Orleans in 2005, fans feared Morgus may have been a victim of the storm, but within weeks, his survival was announced on his official website.

== Cast of characters ==
=== Dr. Morgus ===
Morgus was said to have descended from a long line of scientists dating back to Morgus the First, who was the architect of the first pyramid in Egypt. He mastered calculus at 5 years of age, and his mother and father (both scientists) sent him to the Vasco da Gama Medical school (the finest in the Caribbean) where he graduated with honors. He is reported to have an I.Q. "in the 300s". Morgus claims to have published several scientific books, including his blockbuster "New Hope for the Dead", and the earth-shaking "Molecules I Have Known". He has discovered the speed of dark, and truly invented the Internet. He rails against "those idiots at the station" and "the idiots of the scientific community". Morgus says he is Earth's main member of the "Higher Order", a super-scientific secret society dedicated to helping the development of intelligence throughout the universe. His Momus Alexander Morgus Institute (M.A.M.I., pronounced "mammy") is (unintentionally) a non-profit organization of science.

=== Chopsley ===
Morgus' assistant Chopsley, played by actor Tommy George (after his death, played by James Guillot from 1987 on), was a former medical school classmate, and the subject of an early experiment in "face transplant" surgery. Unfortunately this left him without a face when he laughed before the procedure could heal. As a result, he wears a full head mask at all times (with a zippered mouth through which to eat). As the experiment of each episode would go disastrously wrong at the end, Morgus would always yell, "Chopsley, you idiot!", blaming him for the mishap. Actually, the disaster was Chopsley's fault about half the time. The other half, it was entirely due to Morgus' oversight of some critical detail, but Chopsley always got the blame.

=== Eric ===
Morgus assistant Eric was a talking human skull in early episodes of the show. When the show returned in the 1980s, Eric had become part of the computer known as E.R.I.C. (The Eon Research Infinity Computer). Eric's skull connected to a molecular integrated circuit which holds all the knowledge of the universe in his memory banks (thanks to the oversight of the Higher Order), and whose sepulchral voice introduced the segments and frequently agreed with Morgus with a deep, resonant "Yes, Master". E.R.I.C. is also known for his sharp wit, and sometimes cutting remarks at Morgus. On the set, E.R.I.C. was portrayed by an Apple II with a skull as the speaker.

=== Mrs. Alma Fetish ===
Mrs. Alma Fetish is Morgus' long-time (and long-suffering) landlady, who often forgets that scientific endeavors do not provide rent money on a regular basis. Veteran New Orleans stage actress Janet Shea portrayed Mrs. Fetish in the 1986-1989 "Morgus Presents" version of the show.

=== Wiley Faye ===
Morgus' manager Wiley Faye tried to bring the good doctor increased exposure and better business opportunities, but they never seemed to work out in the end. Wiley was portrayed in the 1986-1989 version of the program by actor Matt Borel, a familiar face from New Orleans area theater and television commercials. Although he gave up acting in the late '90s, Borel went on to become a highly successful stage producer in New Orleans.

== Novelty records ==
In 1959, Mississippi-based Vin Records released a 7-inch single entitled "Morgus The Magnificent" by Frankie Ford and Mac Rebennack performing as "Morgus and The Ghouls" (aka "Morgus & The 3 Ghouls"). The record made the local New Orleans radio top ten record chart. In 1964, the Detroit-based Fulton record label released another single, "Werewolf", featuring Morgus and The Daringers, with an instrumental track ("The Morgus Creep") on its B side.

== Film ==
Morgus' first and only appearance in film was in The Wacky World of Dr. Morgus (1962), which introduced his "Instant People Machine" that could transform people into sand and back to their original form. In the film, Morgus was investigated by a stereotypical reporter known as "Pencils" and foreign agents from Microvania who sought to enter the United States by using the device. Instead of an invasion, its contents ended up as concrete, which was poured at a dedication ceremony for the fittingly-named "People's Highway."

== Appearances ==
Morgus and Chopsley appeared at Pontchartrain Beach amusement park and local events in the early 1960s, and hosted a weather report in later years. Dr. Morgus, Chopsley and E.R.I.C. attempted to branch out across the country in syndicated appearances in Detroit in 1964, New York in the 1980s, and several other cities.

Morgus has appeared on Coast to Coast AM several times as a guest. According to host George Noory, Morgus was an influence on him as a boy and inspired his broadcasting career.

== Death of Sidney Noel Rideau ==
Sidney Noel Rideau, born December 25, 1929 (his name, Noel was inspired by his being born on Christmas Day), died on August 27, 2020.
