= Anne Barton (actress) =

American film and television actor (1924–2000)

- Barton in a 1958 episode of Perry Mason
- Born: Mary Ann Henderson; March 20, 1924; Evansville, Indiana, U.S.
- Died: November 27, 2000 (aged 76); Los Angeles, California, U.S.
- Occupation: Actress
- Years active: 1954–1974
- Spouse: Dan Barton (m. 1949)
- Children: 3

Anne Barton (born Mary Ann Henderson; March 20, 1924 – November 27, 2000) was an American stage, film and television actress.

== Early life ==
Anne Barton was born in Evansville, Indiana at Deaconess Hospital.

== Career ==
She performed in the films Destination 60,000 (1957), Pawnee (1957), The Green-Eyed Blonde (1957), The Left Handed Gun (1958), The Comancheros (1961), What Ever Happened to Baby Jane? (1962), The Way West (1967) and The Great Northfield Minnesota Raid (1972), among others.

Her television appearances include the sitcom Leave It to Beaver (playing Eddie Haskell's mother), The Twilight Zone, Thriller, Perry Mason, Death Valley Days, Gunsmoke, Have Gun-Will Travel, and “Hawaii Five-0”.

== Personal life and death ==
Barton was married to actor Dan Barton. In 2000, at age 76, she died in Los Angeles, California.

== Filmography ==
Year	Title	Role	Notes
1955	The Private War of Major Benson	Miss Carter	Uncredited
1957	Destination 60,000	Grace Hill	
1957	Pawnee	Martha Brewster	
1957	The Green-Eyed Blonde	Sally Abel	Uncredited
1958	The Left Handed Gun	Mrs. Hill	
1961	The Comancheros	Martha Schofield	Uncredited
1962	Pressure Point	Mother	
1962	What Ever Happened to Baby Jane?	Cora Hudson	
1967	The Way West	Mrs. Moynihan	
1972	The Great Northfield Minnesota Raid	Clell's Wife	
1974	Gone with the West	Smithy's Wife	(final film role)

== Partial television ==
Year	Title	Role	Notes
1958	Perry Mason	Carolyn Ellis	Episode: "The Case of the Fancy Figures" (S2E10)
1959	Have Gun - Will Travel	Mrs Ordey	
1960-1961	Twilight Zone	Carol Ritchie / Myra Brand	2 episodes: "The Monsters are Due on Maple Street" and "Shadow Play"
1963	Leave it to Beaver	Agnes Haskell	Two Episodes, Eddie Haskell's Mom
1958-1964	Gunsmoke	Liza Peavy / Millie / Mrs. Boake / Beth Miller	“Gypsum Hills Feud” (S4E16) / “Scott Free” (S9E32) / “Doctor’s Wife” (S10E5) / “Run Sheep, Run” (S10E16)
1968	Green Acres	Mrs. Mullen	“Instant Family” (S3E28)
