= Conduct Unbecoming (1975 film) =

1975 film directed by Michael Anderson

- DVD Cover
- Directed by: Michael Anderson
- Written by: Robert Enders
- Based on: Conduct Unbecoming by Barry England
- Produced by: Michael Deeley; Andrew Donally; Barry Spikings
- Starring: Michael York; Richard Attenborough; Trevor Howard; Stacy Keach; Christopher Plummer; Susannah York
- Cinematography: Robert Huke
- Edited by: John Glen
- Music by: Stanley Myers
- Production company: Lion International
- Distributed by: British Lion Film Corporation
- Release date: 5 October 1975
- Running time: 108 minutes
- Country: United Kingdom
- Language: English

Conduct Unbecoming is a 1975 British period legal drama film directed by Michael Anderson and adapted by Robert Enders from Barry England's play of the same name. It features an ensemble cast, starring Michael York, Richard Attenborough, Trevor Howard, Stacy Keach, Christopher Plummer and Susannah York. Set in a British Indian Army barracks in the late 19th-century, the film centers on an impromptu court-martial following the assault of Captain John Scarlett's widow Marjorie.

Conduct Unbecoming was released by British Lion Films on 5 October 1975, to generally positive reviews. The American National Board of Review ranked the film in its Top Ten Films of 1975.

== Plot ==
In 1878, two young British officers arrive to join a regiment in India. Middle-class Second Lieutenant Arthur Drake, whose father previously served in the regiment, is eager to fit in. Second Lieutenant Edward Millington, son of a general, confides to Drake that he intends to fail his 3-month probationary period; he deliberately antagonizes his fellow officers.

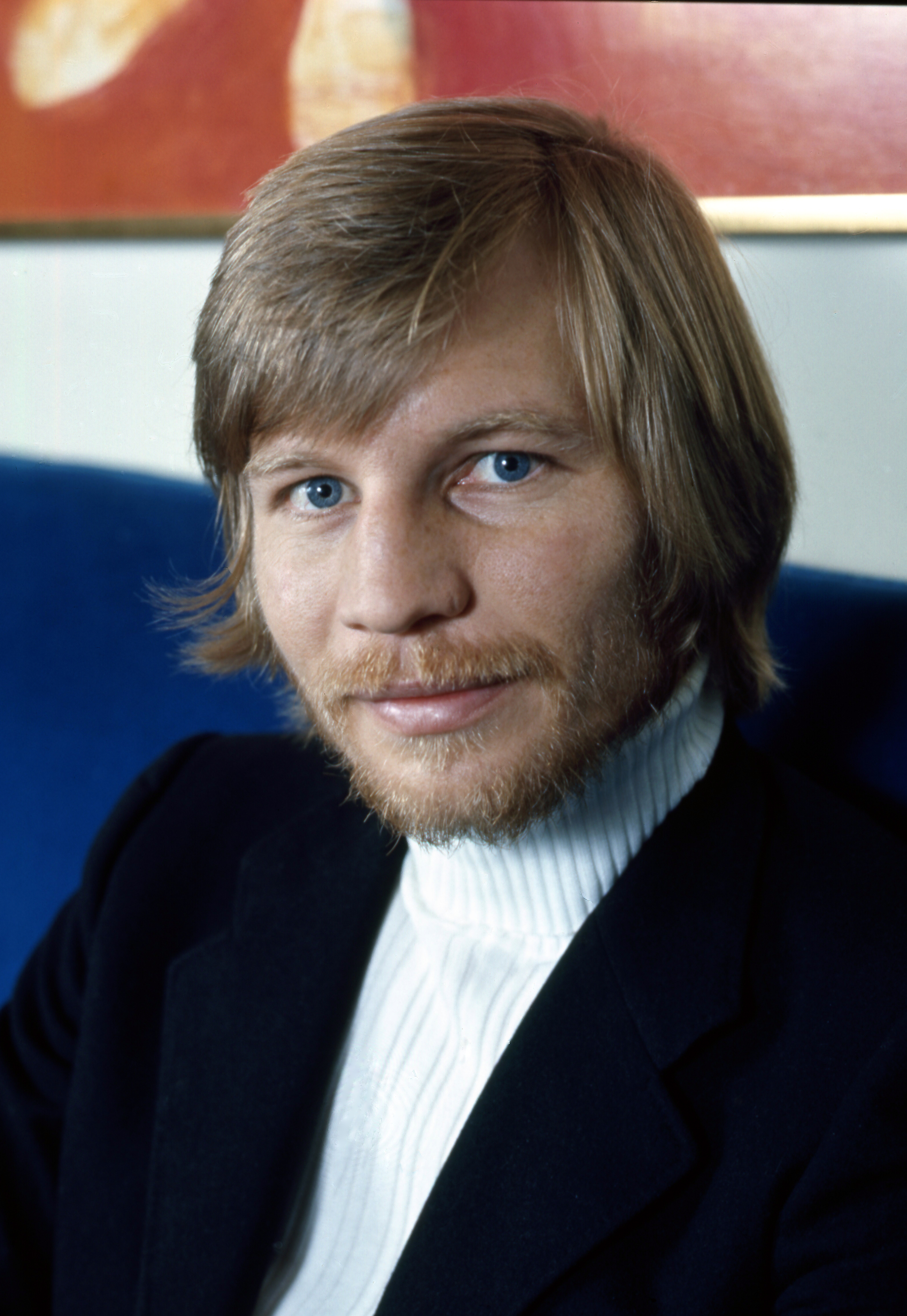
Michael York plays Second Lt. Lieutenant Arthur E. Drake, who has been asked by Millington to defend him at his court martial.

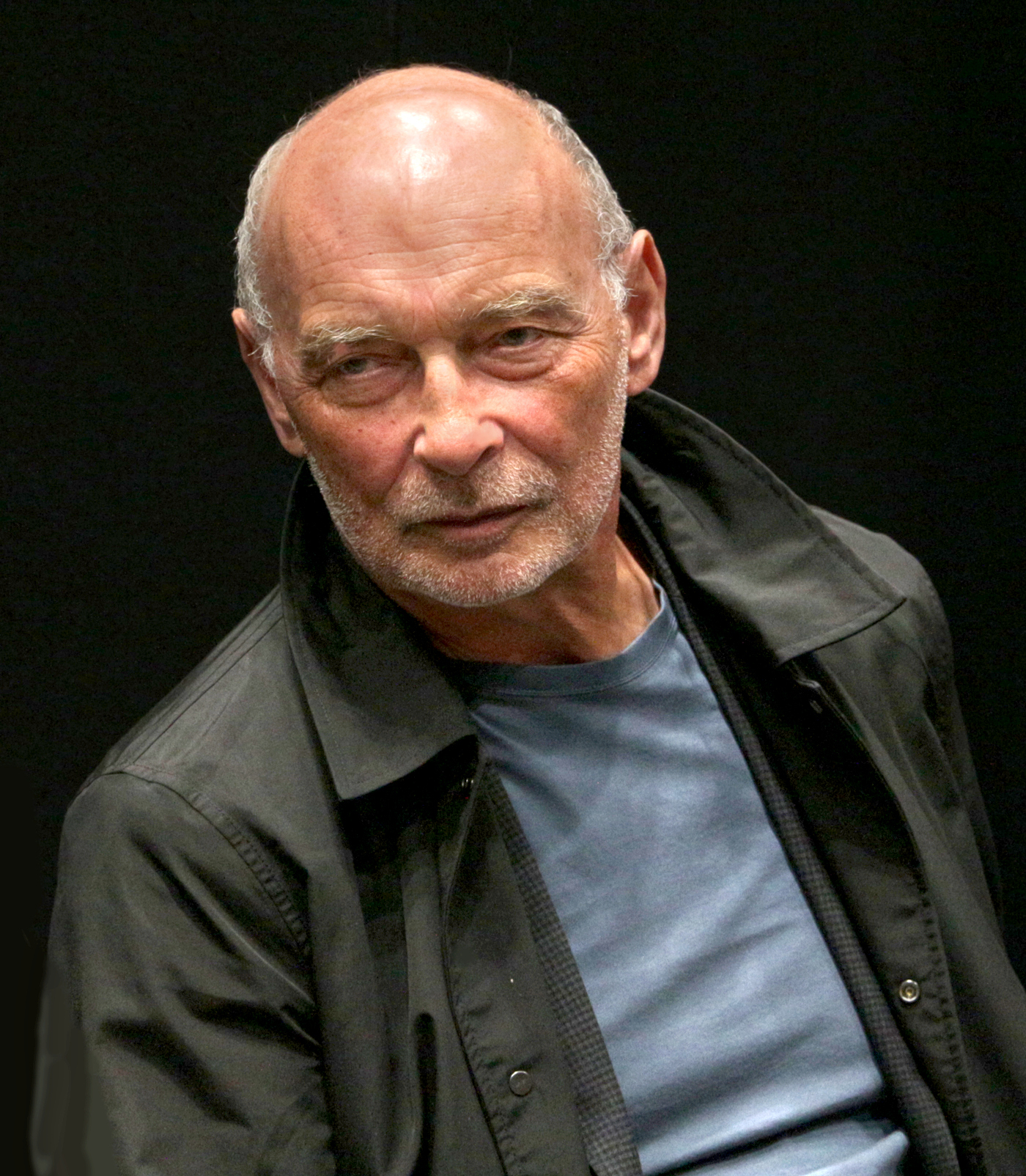
James Faulkner plays Second Lieutenant Edward Millington, who intended to fail his probationary period and is charged with the assault of Mrs. Marjorie Scarlett.

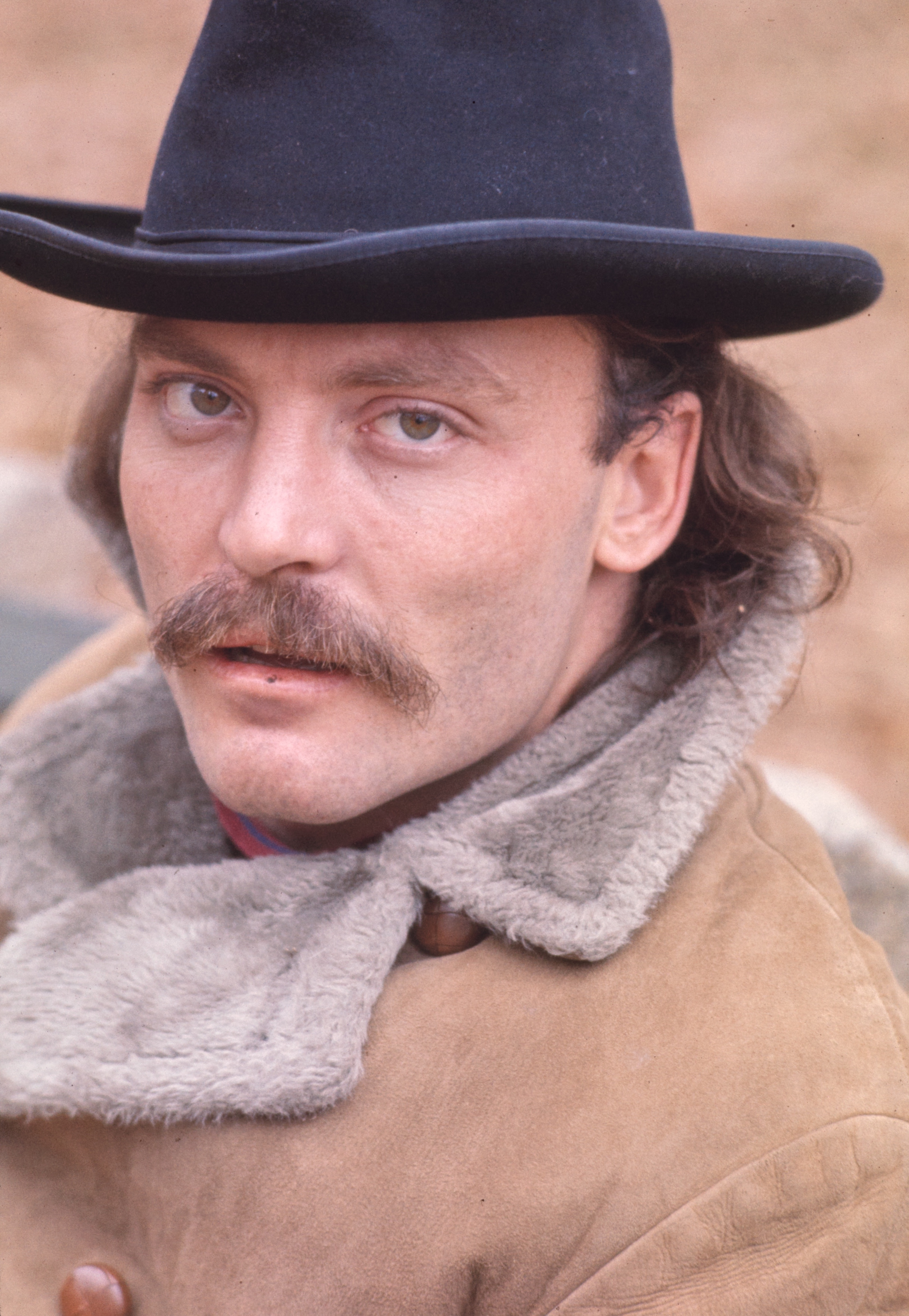
Stacy Keach plays Capt. Stuart Harper, who presides over an informal court martial to avoid public scandal for the regiment.

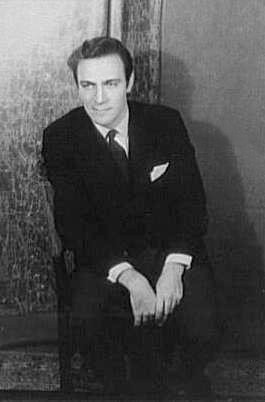
Christopher Plummer plays Maj. Alastair Wimbourne, who knows who the real culprit is but refuses to identify him.

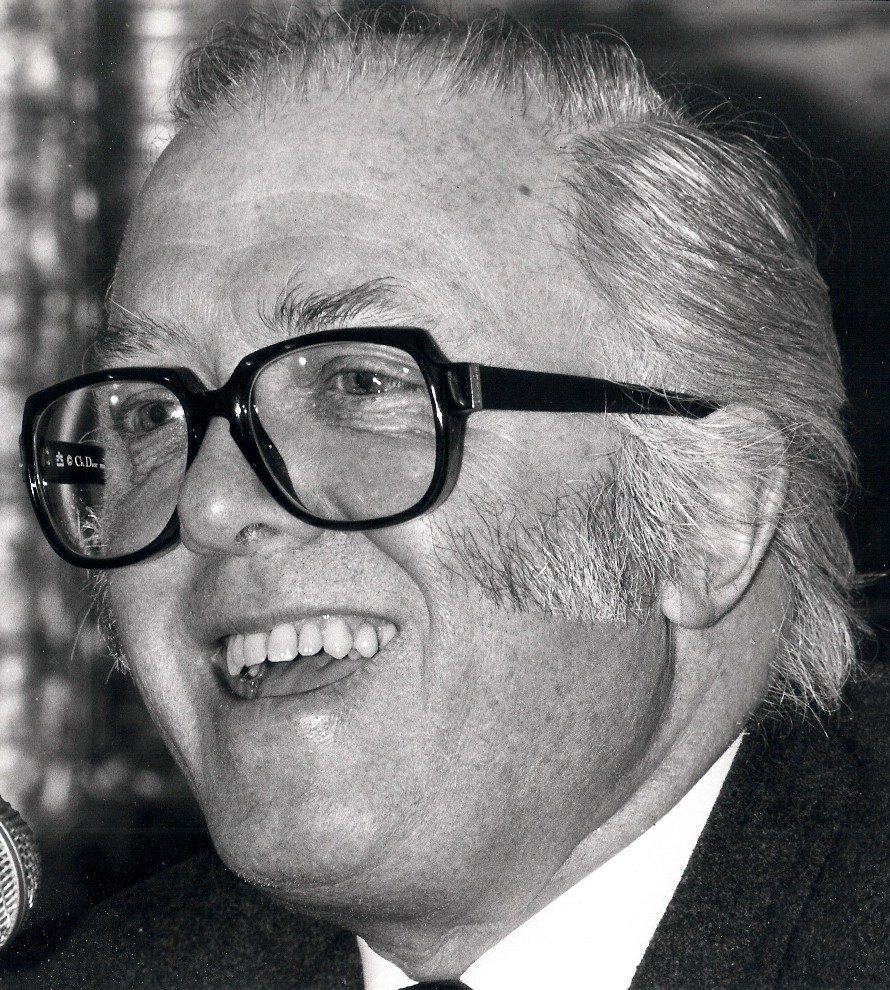
Richard Attenborough plays Maj. Lionel E. Roach, who viewed Captain Scarlett's savaged body at the Battle of Rajapur.

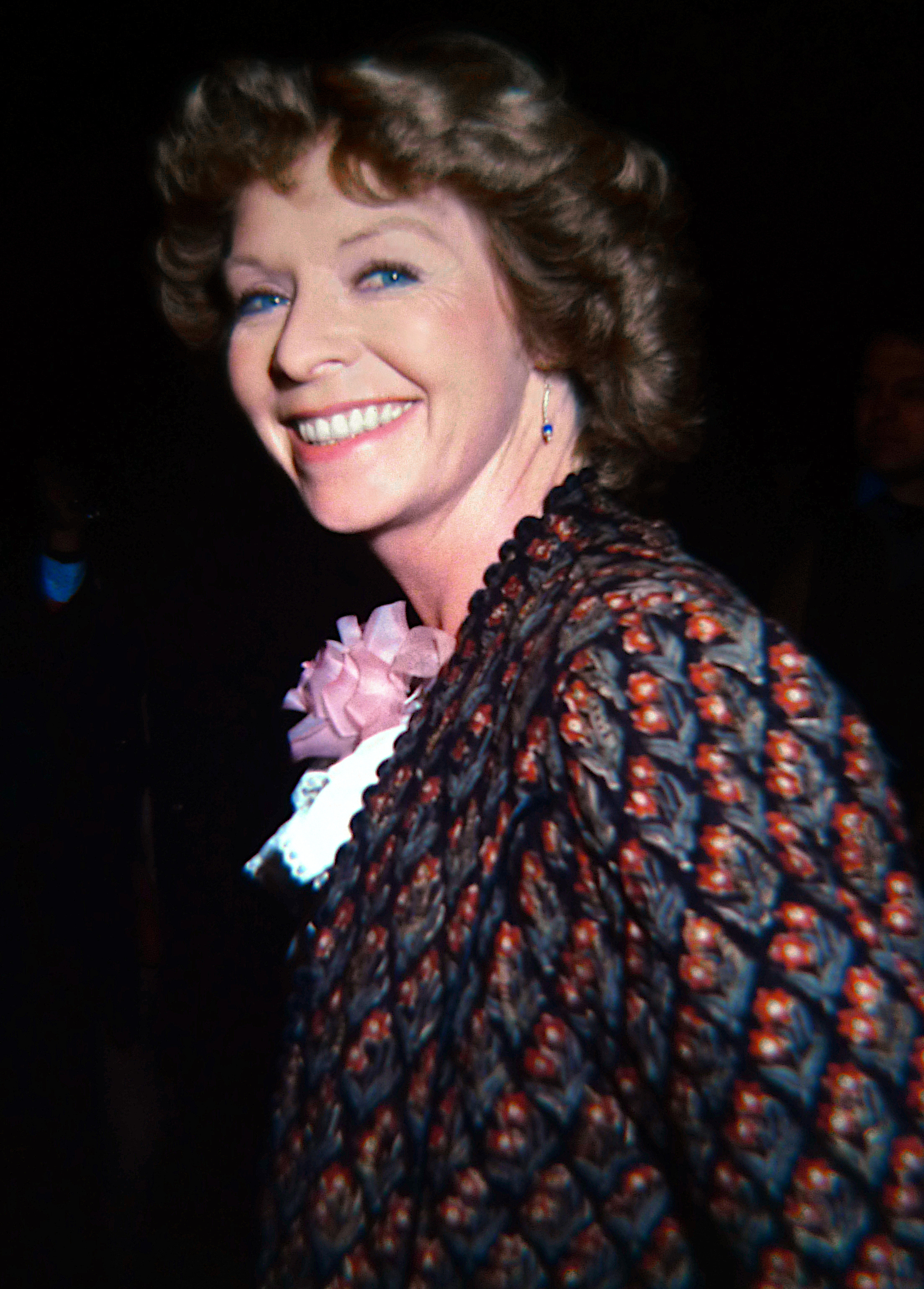
Susannah York plays Mrs. Marjorie Scarlett, widow of fallen hero Captain John Scarlett, who accuses Millington of assault.

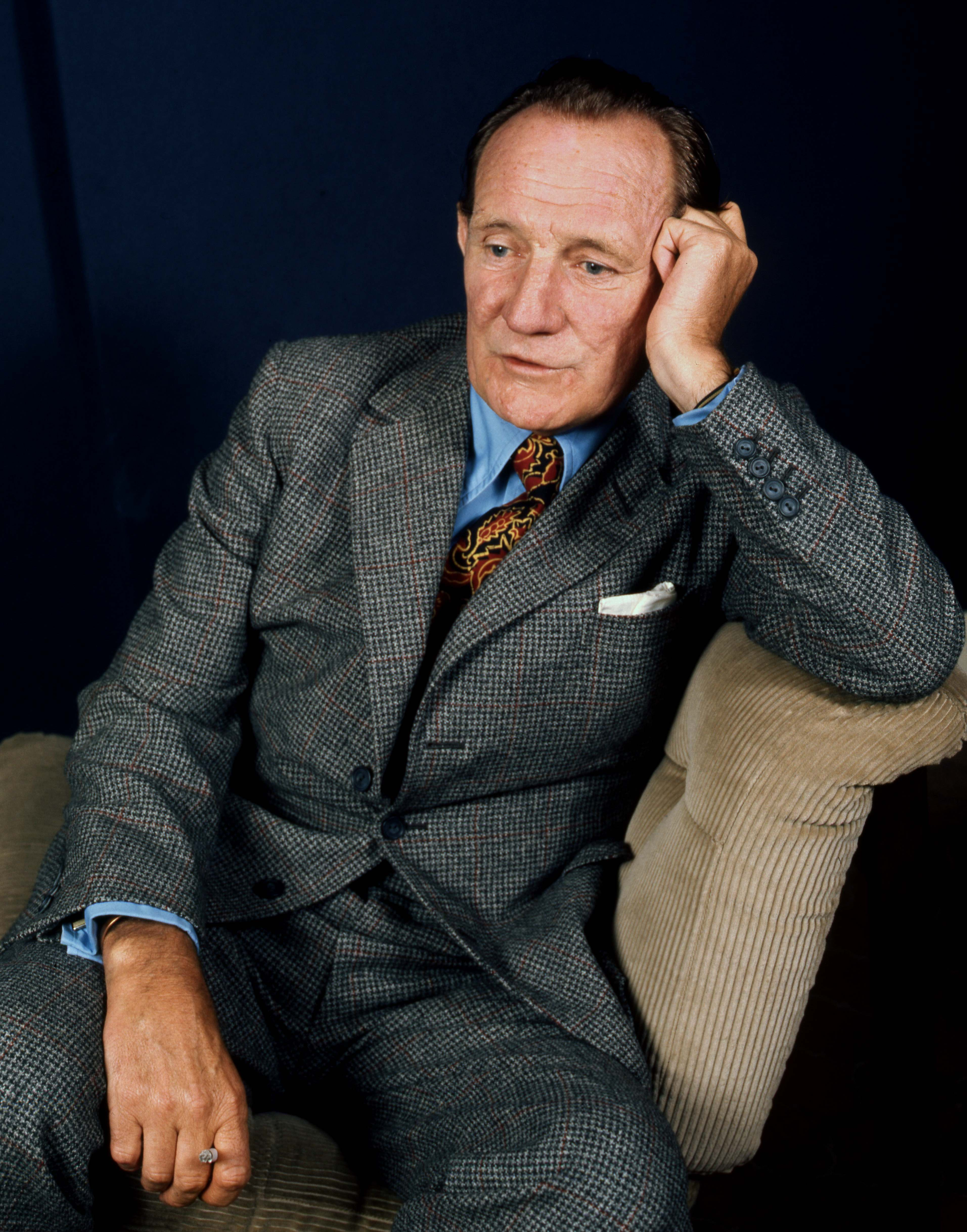
Trevor Howard plays Col. Benjamin Strang, who thanks Captain Harper for administering inconclusive proceedings to protect the honor of the regiment.

Drake and Millington arrive during the third commemoration ceremony of the Battle of Rajapur, where fallen hero Captain John Scarlett is honored annually. His widow, Marjorie Scarlett, again is presented with the Victoria Cross, awarded posthumously for his valor, that she always returns to the regiment. Captain Scarlett's medal, along with his bloody and tattered uniform, hang prominently in a glass case as a testament to his brutal death at the hands of tribesmen. Majors Alastair Wimbourne and Lionel Roach viewed Scarlett's savaged and brutally emasculated body.

Lieutenant Richard Fothergill instructs the two newcomers on the regiment's rigid rules and traditions. He warns the young officers that they should not take advantage of the favors offered by the attractive and respected widow, Mrs. Scarlett. Millington immediately breaks the rules by addressing Mrs. Scarlett and Fothergill warns him that another such infraction will get him kicked out of the regiment.

While Millington remains aloof, Drake participates in a regimental mess game where officers chase a wooden pig on wheels, pulled by Drake. Catching it, they fiercely pierce the wooden pig's anus with their swords while yelling “pig!”

At a dance, Millington gets drunk and tries to seduce Mrs. Scarlett in the garden. She repels him but moments later runs back into the mess wounded and bloodied in her hindquarters, claiming the culprit was Millington. An informal court martial—a private hearing designed to avoid public scandal for the regiment—is presided over by Captain Stuart Harper. Millington chooses Drake to be his defending advocate and Drake is obliged to undertake the role.

Though pressured by his superior officer to plead Millington guilty and close the case quickly, Drake insists on giving the defendant a fair trial. Drake learns from Mrs. Scarlett's Indian servant Pradah Singh that Mrs. Bandanai, widow of an Indian soldier who died with Scarlett, suffered a similar attack with a sword six months prior, long before Millington joined the regiment. When pressed, Mrs. Bandanai says Captain Scarlett assaulted her.

Warning Mrs. Scarlett to keep silent, Wimbourne threatens, “They’ll take India away from you.” At the hearing, when shown her dress from the night of the assault, with blood and a cut likely made with a sword point, Mrs. Scarlett acts out the attack, which mimics the regimental game of officers chasing then stabbing a wooden pig on wheels. She admits it was not Millington who attacked her but will not say who did, saying the regiment are all “cruel men who treat women and pigs alike.”

Wimbourne knows who the culprit is but refuses to identify him. Millington, now proved innocent, is embraced by his brother officers and now willingly fits in; Drake, disgusted by the truth he's uncovered, resigns. Colonel Benjamin Strang thanks Captain Harper for his conduct in administering the inconclusive proceedings. When asked whether he wishes his resignation accepted, Drake responds that he puts his personal honor above that of the regiment. Colonel Strang responds that Drake's honor and the regiment's should be one, accepting the resignation with regret.

Colonel Strang confronts Wimbourne about shielding the attacker; Wimbourne replies that identifying the culprit would oblige Colonel Strang to take official action: “The regiment would never have survived the scandal.” Wimbourne assures Colonel Strang the matter will be handled in the “traditional way, as a matter of honor.”

Wimbourne returns to the drawing-room and speaks to Drake, telling him that protecting the culprit was about “comradeship,” not “honor.” Wimbourne tells Drake that the culprit had become possessed after witnessing Captain Scarlett's mutilated and emasculated corpse and when the culprit considers the wives of dead regimental heroes to be "unfaithful", the culprit donned Captain Scarlett's bloody and torn coat and attacked those wives in his possessed persona of Captain Scarlett. Wimbourne then tells Drake to sit in the shadows and witness what happens next, then turns down the remaining light in the room to wait for the real culprit to enter.

Steps are heard and the real culprit enters the room: Major Lionel Roach. Roach and Winbourne speak occasionally to help Roach cope with what he has done and allow Winbourne to keep Roach's attacks secret, preserving the honor of the regiment and the traumatised Roach. But this time Wimbourne confronts Roach, saying he can protect him no longer and the matter must end and Roach finally comes to terms with what he has done. Wimbourne and Drake leave Roach with a loaded pistol, which Roach puts to his head and fires. Roach is “honorably” recorded in the regimental archives as “killed in action" at Rajapur.

== Cast ==
- Michael York as 2nd Lt. Lieutenant Arthur E. Drake
- Richard Attenborough as Maj. Lionel E. Roach
- Trevor Howard as Col. Benjamin Strang
- Stacy Keach as Capt. Stuart Harper
- Christopher Plummer as Maj. Alastair Wimbourne
- Susannah York as Mrs. Marjorie Scarlett
- James Faulkner as 2nd Lt. Edward Millington
- James Donald as Doctor
- Rafiq Anwar as Pradah Singh
- Helen Cherry as Mrs. Strang
- Michael Culver as Lt. Richard Fothergill
- Persis Khambatta as Mrs. Bandanai
- Michael Byrne as 2nd Lt. Toby Strang
- Michael Fleming as Lt. Frank Hart
- David Robb as 2nd Lt. Winters
- David Purcell as 2nd Lt. Boulton
- Andrew Lodge as 2nd Lt. Hutton
- David Neville as 2nd Lt. Truly
- Jamila Massey as Servant

== Production ==
Barry England's play premiered in 1969 and had a short run on Broadway the following year. The film was greenlit by Michael Deeley and Barry Spikings who had recently become managing directors of British Lion Films and was part financed through a US tax deal. Deeley said there had been a number of screenplays written, including one by Terence Rattigan which Deeley says cost £250,000. He said all of them "failed to crack the adaptation" but there was "a very simple solution, which was to go back to the stage play and strip out as much extraneous dialogue as possible. Robert Enders delivered a perfect screenplay by these means."

Deeley hired Michael Anderson to direct, in part because he was efficient, and the film was shot at Shepperton Studios over four weeks starting mid November 1974. This meant the filmmakers had five weeks before the studio shut down over Christmas. Deeley says "the picture ran like clockwork". The veteran Elizabeth Haffenden designed the costumes in her final film production.

A novelisation of the film was produced by the writer Rupert Croft-Cooke and published by W. H. Allen.

== Reception ==
Deeley says the film was "well made, at the right price and completely fulfilling British Lion's objective – to make money".

Film critic John Simon wrote – "Conduct Unbecoming can be viewed with modest pleasure if only for its performances and the cinematography of Bob Huke".

The American National Board of Review ranked the film in its Top Ten Films of 1975.

== Notes ==
- Deeley, Michael (2009). Blade runners, deer hunters and blowing the bloody doors off : my life in cult movies. Pegasus Books. ISBN 9781605980386.
