= Gloria Dawn =

Canadian model

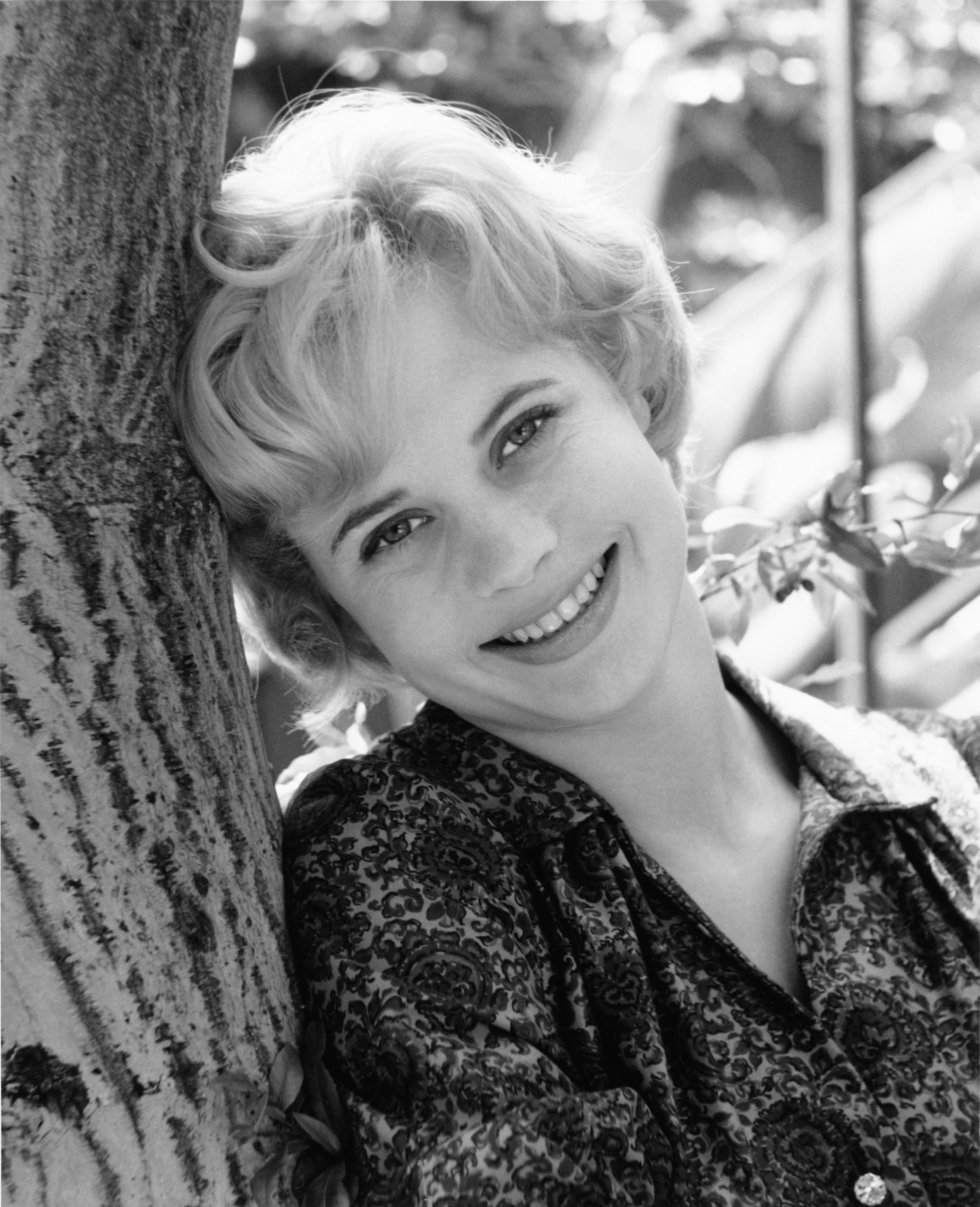
- Dawn in 1962
- Born: Gloria Moeser; July 27, 1940 (age 86); Saskatoon, Saskatchewan, Canada
- Other names: Shannon Dawn Moeser; Gloria Dawn
- Education: Simon Fraser University; McGill University
- Occupation: Model

Gloria Moeser(born July 27, 1940) also known as Shannon Dawn Moeser and Gloria Dawn was a Canadian model who appeared in numerous softcore men's magazines in the early 1960s.

== Biography ==
Dawn's real name was Gloria Moeser. She was born in Saskatoon, Canada in 1940, but in 1965 she changed her first name to "Shannon", thereafter known as Shannon Dawn Moeser and professionally also, as Gloria Dawn.

In September she enrolled at Simon Fraser University to complete a BA, and obtained a Phd at McGill University in 1971.

Dawn began her career in January 1962, and modeled for photographers Peter Gowland, Ron Vogel, Donald G. Klumpp, Sam Wu, Elmer Batters, and Keith Bernard among others.

She left the industry in August 1963 but her pictures continued to appear in publications until 1968. In recent years, her photos have appeared in art books and in one volume of a series on the history of men's magazines.

Ms. Dawn worked for eight months as a blond and usually “Gloria Dawn” was the name accompanying pictures taken of her as a blond. She worked for three months as a brunette and one month as a strawberry blond. In her brunette and her strawberry blond pictures, the name “Gloria Dawn” was never used. Keith Bernard identified her as “Susan Norman”, and in publications using photos by Elmer Batters, she was given a different name whenever she appeared.

While a model she lived at the Hollywood Studio Club where her roommate was actress Adrienne Ellis.
