= Figures in a Landscape =

1968 novel by Barry England

- 2013 edition cover (publ.Valancourt Books)
- Author: Barry England
- Publisher: Jonathan Cape
- Publication date: January 1, 1968
- ISBN: 978-0-224-61303-3

Figures in a Landscape was Barry England's first novel. Published by Jonathan Cape in the summer of 1968, it was hailed by critics as an exemplary addition to the literature of escape. Two professional soldiers, Ansell and MacConnachie, have escaped from a column of POWs in an unnamed country in the tropics. Safety across the border lies 400 miles away; in the meantime, they must make their way through alien territory, battling the climate and the terrain as well as the enemy's soldiers and helicopters. The Times called the book "a fiercely masochistic accomplishment" and concluded another review as follows:

"Barry England's prose has the tough, spare elegance of steel scaffolding. His vocabulary is wide, and used with arresting precision. The speed of the narrative is impeccably controlled - long slogs over country, moments of blind panic, passages of demoralizing inactivity, hair-raising evasions, all building up to a central set-piece in a burning field. On all levels, Figures in a Landscape is a brilliant achievement."

Figures in a Landscape was nominated for the inaugural Booker Prize (losing to P. H. Newby's Something to Answer For) but won the Authors' Club Best First Novel Award. The novel was made into a film by famed director Joseph Losey in 1970, and featured Robert Shaw and Malcolm McDowell in the two main roles.
