= Barry England =

English playwright and novelist

Barry England (16 March 1932 – 21 May 2009) was an English novelist and playwright. He is chiefly known for his 1968 thriller Figures in a Landscape, which was nominated for the inaugural Booker Prize.

== Life and work ==
England was raised in a Roman Catholic household and studied at Downside School. He joined the British Army and served in the Far Eastern theatre, where he did his share of arduous marches "over two or three mountains in a day". His stint in the army would serve England well later in his literary career. He studied at RADA as a playwright, and around this time began writing pieces for magazines. The first of England's plays to be produced was End of Conflict, which was staged at the Belgrade Theatre in Coventry in November 1961. The young Ian McKellen played one of the principal roles in this story of British soldiers serving in the Far East. The success of End of Conflict led to the Arts Council awarding a playwriting bursary to England.

In 1963, the Belgrade staged England's next play The Big Contract, a story of industrial dispute in a large firm. England also wrote plays for television throughout the 1960s, for example, The Move After Checkmate, a crime thriller that was broadcast in 1966 as part of Anglia Television's "Play of the Week" series.

=== Figures in a Landscape ===
Figures in a Landscape was England's first novel. Published by Jonathan Cape in the summer of 1968, it was hailed by critics as an exemplary addition to the literature of escape. Two professional soldiers, Ansell and MacConnachie, have escaped from a column of POWs in an unnamed country in the tropics. Safety across the border lies 400 miles away; in the meantime, they must make their way through alien territory, battling the climate and the terrain as well as the enemy's soldiers and helicopters. The Times called the book "a fiercely masochistic accomplishment" and concluded another review as follows:

Barry England's prose has the tough, spare elegance of steel scaffolding. His vocabulary is wide, and used with arresting precision. The speed of the narrative is impeccably controlled – long slogs over country, moments of blind panic, passages of demoralizing inactivity, hair-raising evasions, all building up to a central set-piece in a burning field. On all levels, Figures in a Landscape is a brilliant achievement.

— Roger Baker in the Times, 8 June 1968

In 1970 the novel was made into a film directed by Joseph Losey with Robert Shaw and Malcolm McDowell in the two main roles. According to The Times, England had been working on a second novel provisionally entitled The Other Woman, but it is unclear whether this book ever saw the light of day.

=== Conduct Unbecoming ===
England's other significant work was the play Conduct Unbecoming. First staged in May 1969 at the Theatre Royal in Bristol, the story concerns a scandal in a regiment of the Indian cavalry in the 1880s. Conduct Unbecoming transferred to the West End in July 1969, playing at the Queen's Theatre. Michael Billington wrote of the play:

... with a structural skill that Rattigan would not disown, Mr. England has created a genuinely suspenseful thriller in which characterization is almost never subordinated to the demands of the story line.

This play too was translated into a film, Conduct Unbecoming, with Michael York, Stacy Keach, Richard Attenborough and Trevor Howard in starring roles. England's second novel, No Man's Land, was published by Jonathan Cape in 1997.

== Personal life ==
He married actress Diane Clare (1938–2013) in 1967, with whom he had two children; Kate and Christopher. They remained married until his death in 2009.
