= Rupert Croft-Cooke =

English writer (1903–1979)

Rupert Croft-Cooke (20 June 1903 – 10 June 1979) was an English writer. He was a prolific creator of fiction and non-fiction, including screenplays and biographies under his own name and detective stories under the pseudonym of Leo Bruce.

== Life ==
Rupert Croft-Cooke was born on 20 June 1903, in Edenbridge, Kent, the son of Hubert Bruce Cooke, who worked in the London Stock Exchange, and his wife Lucy, a daughter of Dr. Alfred Taylor, and was educated at Tonbridge School and Wellington College. At the age of seventeen, he was working as a private tutor in Paris. He spent 1923 and 1924 in Buenos Aires, where he founded the journal La Estrella. In 1925 he returned to London and began a career as a freelance journalist and writer, at about this time combining his middle name into his surname. His work appeared in several magazines, including New Writing, Adelphi, and the English Review. In the late 1920s the American magazine Poetry published several of his plays. He was also a radio broadcaster on psychology. In 1929 he became a dealer in antiquarian books, continuing this business until 1931. From 1930 he spent a year in Germany, and in 1931 lectured in English at the Institut Montana Zugerberg in Switzerland. In 1940 he joined the British Army and served in Africa and India until 1946. He later wrote several books about his military experiences. From 1947 to 1953 he was a book reviewer for The Sketch.

Croft-Cooke was homosexual, which brought him into conflict with the laws of his time. In 1953, at a time when the Home Office was seeking to clamp down on homosexuality, he was sent to prison for six months on conviction for acts of indecency. Croft-Cooke and his secretary and companion, Joseph Alexander, had met two Navy cooks, Harold Altoft and Ronald Charles Dennis, in the Fitzroy Tavern near Tottenham Court Road in London, and invited them to spend the weekend at Croft-Cooke's house in Ticehurst, East Sussex. During the weekend it was alleged that they conducted acts of indecency with Croft-Cooke and his secretary. On their way home from the weekend, and in a drunken state, they assaulted a road worker, and a police officer who had come to the scene. They were arrested and agreed to testify against Croft-Cooke in order to be granted immunity from prosecution for the assault charges.

The case of Croft-Cooke was discussed by the Committee that produced the Wolfenden report into changing the law on prostitution and homosexuality, specifically by Philip Allen, a civil servant testifying on behalf of the Home Office. Allen described Croft-Cooke and Alexander as attempting to "interfere" with the sailors, who resisted their advances. Michael Graham-Harrison, a junior Home Office civil servant, attempted to correct Allen's rhetorical overreaching, noting that the sailors were "picked up in a place frequented by homosexuals" and arguing that he did "not think anybody could believe for a moment that they did not know what they were going for".

After being convicted, Croft-Cooke was sent to Wormwood Scrubs, and then to Brixton Prison. He later wrote about the entire experience of his arrest and imprisonment along with his views of the British penal system in The Verdict of You All (1955).

A novel by Croft-Cooke's from 1956 formed the basis for the 1957 war film of the same name Seven Thunders. He also wrote for television, including two episodes of Alfred Hitchcock Presents in 1959. He is best known today for the detective stories he wrote under the name of Leo Bruce. His detectives were named Carolus Deene and Sergeant Beef.

After his release from prison in 1954 Croft-Cooke lived until 1968 in Morocco, fearing continued persecution in Britain for homosexuality, before moving on to live in Tunisia, Cyprus, West Germany, and Ireland.

Croft-Cooke returned to England in the 1970s and died in 1979, when he was living at 4, Amira Court, Bourne Avenue, Bournemouth. He left an estate valued at £9,297.

== Selected works as Rupert Croft-Cooke ==
=== Non-fiction ===
- God in Ruins (1936)
- Darts (1938)
- How to Get More Out of Life (1938)
- Major Road Ahead (ed. 1939)
- The Circus Book (ed. 1947)
- Rudyard Kipling (1948)
- How to Enjoy Travel Abroad (1948)
- The Sawdust Ring with W.S. Meadmore (1951)
- Cities with Noel Barber (1952)
- Buffalo Bill with W.S. Meadmore (1952)
- Sherry (1955)
- Port (1957)
- Smiling Damned Villain: The True Story of Paul Axel Lund (1959)
- English Cooking, a New Approach (1960)
- Madeira (1961)
- Cooking for Pleasure (1962)
- Wine and Other Drinks (1962; reprinted 1966)
- Bosie: The Story of Lord Alfred Douglas (1963)
- Tales of a Wicked Uncle (1963)
- Feasting With Panthers: A New Consideration of Some Late Victorian Writers (1967)
- Exotic Food (1969)
- The Unrecorded Life of Oscar Wilde (1972)
- Circus: A World History with Peter Cotes (1976)

=== 'The Sensual World' series of autobiography ===
- The Moon in My Pocket (1948)
- The Life for Me (1952)
- The Blood-Red Island (1953)
- The Verdict of You All (1955)
- The Tangerine House (1956)
- The Gardens of Camelot (1958)
- The Quest for Quixote (1959)
- The Altar in the Loft (1960)
- The Drums of Morning (1961)
- The Glittering Pastures (1962)
- The Numbers Came (1963)
- The Last of Spring (1964)
- The Wintry Sea (1964)
- The Gorgeous East (1965)
- The Purple Streak (1966)
- The Wild Hills (1966)
- The Happy Highways (1967)
- The Ghost of June (1968)
- The Sound of Revelry (1969)
- The Licentious Soldiery (1971)
- The Dogs of Peace (1973)
- The Caves of Hercules (1974)
- The Long Way Home (1974)
- The Green, Green Grass (1977)

=== Supplementary ===
- The World is Young (1937)
- The Man in Europe Street (1938)
- The Circus Has No Home (1941)

=== Novels, short story collections, poetry and plays ===
- Clouds of Gold [Poetry] (1920)
- Songs of a Sussex Tramp [Poetry] (1922)
- Tonbridge School [Poetry] (1922). Published in aid of the school's War Memorial Fund
- Songs South of the Line [Poetry] (1925)
- The Telegram [Radio play] (1926)
- She that is Heaven's Queen Blackfriars, [Poetry] (October 1926)
- In Snow Blackfriars, [Poetry] (October 1927)
- Twenty Poems from the Spanish of Becquer [Poetry] (1927)
- Downstairs [Poetry] (July 1928)
- That Pueblo [Poetry] (July 1928)
- Three Miles from Tilbury [Poetry] (July 1928)
- Some Poems [Poetry] (1929)
- Banquo's Chair [Stage play] (1930)
- Troubador (1930)
- Give Him the Earth (1930)
- Tap Three Times [Stage play] (1931)
- Night Out (1932)
- Cosmopolis (1932)
- Release the Lions (1933)
- Deliberate Accident [Stage play] (1934)
- Picaro (1934)
- Shoulder the Sky (1934)
- Blind Gunner (1935)
- Crusade (1936)
- Kingdom Come (1936)
- Rule Britannia (1938)
- Pharaoh With His Wagons [Short story collection] (1938)
- Same Way Home (1940)
- Glorious (1940)
- Octopus (1946)
- Ladies Gay (1946)
- Miss Allick (1947)
- Wilkie (1948)
- Brass Farthing (1950)
- Three Names for Nicholas (1951)
- Nine Days with Edward (1952)
- Harvest Moon (1953)
- Fall of Man (1955)
- Seven Thunders (1956)
- Barbary Night (1958)
- Thief (1961)
- Clash by Night (1962)
- Paper Albatross (1965)
- St George for England [Poetry] (1966)
- Three in a Cell (1968)
- Wolf From the Door (1969)
- Exiles (1970)
- While the Iron's Hot (1971)
- Under the Rose Garden (1971)
- Nasty Piece of Work (1973)
- Conduct Unbecoming (1975). Novelisation of the film Conduct Unbecoming

=== Short stories ===
- 'The Appointed Key'. The Graphic, 21 May 1927
- 'A Ship on the Horizon'. The Graphic, 20 February 1932
- 'The Legacy'. Pearson's Weekly, 2 April 1932
- 'An Eye for an Eye'. Everybody's Weekly, 25 June 1932
- 'Politeness Pays'. Everybody's Weekly, 10 December 1932
- 'Mr Smith's Hallucinations'. Daily Herald, 25 December 1933
- 'Seat 116'. Pearson's Weekly, 5 May 1934
- 'Termination 2'. (London) Evening Standard, 1 August 1934
- 'Publicity'. Daily Herald, 8 November 1934
- 'Headlines'. Everybody's Weekly, 11 August 1936
- 'Brain Wave'. The Australasian, 17 and 18 October 1936
- 'One Frosty Night'. Everybody's Weekly, 29 March 1938
- 'The Uninvited Guest'. Everybody's Weekly, 10 May 1938
- 'The Late Mr Trilbert'. The Sketch, 5 July 1939
- 'Combat'. Falkirk Herald, 3 January 1940, Reprinted in Linlithgowshire Gazette, 5 January 1940
- 'A Football for the Brigadier and other Stories' (1950)
- 'Grandmother Smith'. John Bull, 27 January 1951
- 'A Few Gypsies' (1955)
- 'The Line Went Dead'. The Tatler, 21 December 1960

=== Short non-fiction ===
- 'What the Prince Will See in Chile'. Yorkshire Post, 7 September 1925
- 'South America'. Yorkshire Post, 15 October 1930
- 'The Criminal Mind'. Reynolds’ Illustrated News, 3 September 1933
- 'Freedom for Sale'. Kensington News & West London Times, 23 November 1934
- 'Talking about Freedom'. Northern Daily Mail, 27 April 1935
- 'Perils of Philanthropy'. Northern Daily Mail, 25 January 1936. Reprinted, Montrose Review, 7 February 1936
- 'A Protest against Placards'. Northern Daily Mail, 26 September 1936
- 'The Tyranny of Uniforms'. (Portsmouth) Evening News, 17 September 1937. Reprinted: Motherwell Times, 22 October 1937
- 'Freedom on the Continent'. Linlithgowshire Gazette, 15 April 1938
- 'Is He Trying to Make You Furious? Daily Mirror, 21 May 1938
- 'If the League of Nations Met in a Public Bar'. Kensington News & West London Times, 22 July 1938
- 'The Man in Europe Street'. Midland Daily Telegraph, 11 October 1938
- 'I’m Tired of Being Treated Like a Child'. Illustrated Leicester Chronicle, 17 June 1939
- 'Freedom is in Danger'. Falkirk Herald, 28 February 1940. Reprinted: Northern Daily Mail, 25 March 1940
- 'Paradise for Busybodies'. Falkirk Herald, 18 June 1941
- 'Freedom of the Seas'. Dumfries and Galloway Standard & Advertiser, 17 December 1941. Also published: Falkirk Herald, (17 December 1941)
- 'Living in a Tent'. Dumfries and Galloway Standard & Advertiser, 1 July 1944
- 'The Lesser Freedom'. Dumfries and Galloway Standard & Advertiser, 12 May 1945
- 'The Tyranny of Time'. Northern Daily Mail, 20 December 1945
- 'H E Bates'. The Sketch, 21 May 1952
- 'Tom Thumb: The Midget Who Made a Fortune'. The World's News, 17 October 1953

== Selected works as Leo Bruce ==
Under the name of Leo Bruce, one series of novels featured Sergeant Beef, a British police officer; a second featured Carolus Deene, senior history master at the fictional Queen's School, Newminster, as an amateur detective.

=== Novels ===
==== Sergeant Beef series ====
- Case for Three Detectives (1936) ISBN 0-89733-033-1: An example of the locked room type of murder mystery, this book spoofs three famous fictional detectives, Lord Peter Wimsey, as Lord Simon Plimsoll, Hercule Poirot as Monsieur Amer Picon, and Father Brown, under the name of Monsignor Smith. Repr Academy Chicago Publishers, 1980; Chicago Review Press, 2005.
- Case Without a Corpse (1937)
- Case With No Conclusion (1939)
- Case With Four Clowns (1939). Repr Academy Chicago Publishers, 2010.
- Case With Ropes and Rings (1940). Repr Chicago Review Press, 2019.
- Case For Sergeant Beef (1947)
- Neck and Neck (1951). Repr Academy Chicago Publishers, 2019.
- Cold Blood (1952). Repr Academy Chicago Publishers, 2019.
- Murder in Miniature: The Short Stories of Leo Bruce (Ed. B.A. Pike). Academy Chicago Publishers, 1992.

===== Short stories as 'Leo Bruce' =====
- 'Clue in the Mustard'. (London) Evening Standard, 24 March 1950. Collected in Murder in Miniature
- 'Holiday Task'. (London) Evening Standard, 13 May 1950. Collected in Murder in Miniature
- 'Murder in Miniature'. (London) Evening Standard, 6 September 1950. Collected in Murder in Miniature
- 'The Doctor's Wife'. (London) Evening Standard, 10 October 1950. Collected in Murder in Miniature
- 'Beef and the Spider'. (London) Evening Standard, 22 November 1950. Collected in Murder in Miniature
- 'Summons to Death'. (London) Evening Standard, 1 March 1951. Collected in Murder in Miniature
- 'The Chicken and the Egg'. (London) Evening Standard, 29 May 1951. Collected in Murder in Miniature
- 'On the Spot'. (Inspector Simler story). Collected in Murder in Miniature
- 'Blunt Instrument'. To be confirmed, (London) Evening Standard, 20 August 1951. Collected in Murder in Miniature
- 'I, Said the Sparrow'. (London) Evening Standard, 6 October 1951. Collected in Murder in Miniature
- 'A Piece of Paper' (London) Evening Standard, 30 January 1952. Collected in Murder in Miniature
- 'The Inverness Cape'. The Sketch, 16 July 1952. Reprinted in Bodies from the Library Volume 1 (Ed. Tony Medawar)
- 'Letter of the Law'. (Abel Ziccary story) (London) Evening Standard, 30 September 1952. Collected in Murder in Miniature
- 'A Glass of Sherry'. (London) Evening Standard, 7 October 1952. Collected in Murder in Miniature
- 'The Scene of the Crime'. (London) Evening Standard, 10 October 1952. Collected in Murder in Miniature
- 'Murder in Reverse'. (London) Evening Standard, 27 December 1952. Collected in Murder in Miniature
- 'Woman in the Taxi'. (London) Evening Standard, 15 January 1953. Collected in Murder in Miniature
- 'The Nine-Fifty-Five'. (London) Evening Standard, 17 February 1953. Collected in Murder in Miniature
- 'Person or Persons'. (London) Evening Standard, 4 March 1953. Collected in Murder in Miniature
- 'The Wrong Moment'. (London) Evening Standard, 18 March 1953. Collected in Murder in Miniature
- 'A Box of Capsules'. (London) Evening Standard, 29 April 1953. Collected in Murder in Miniature
- 'Blind Witness'. (London) Evening Standard, 22 May 1953. Collected in Murder in Miniature
- 'Deceased Wife's Sister'. (London) Evening Standard, 10 June 1953. Collected in Murder in Miniature
- 'Riverside Night'. (London) Evening Standard, 22 July 1953. Collected in Murder in Miniature
- 'Rufus - and the Murderer'. (London) Evening Standard, 24 August 1955. Collected in Murder in Miniature
- 'The Marsh Light'. (London) Evening Standard, 2 June 1956. Collected in Murder in Miniature
- 'A Stiff Drink'. (London) Evening Standard, 16 July 1956. Collected in Murder in Miniature
- 'Into Thin Air'. (London) Evening Standard, 29 August 1956. Collected in Murder in Miniature
- 'A Case for the Files'. (London) Evening Standard, 9 November 1956. Collected in Murder in Miniature
- 'Beef for Christmas'. The Tatler, 8 November 1957. Reprinted in Silent Nights - Christmas Mysteries (Ed. Martin Edwards)
- 'Rigor Mortis'. First published in Bodies from the Library. Volume 4 (Ed. Tony Medawar)

=== Carolus Deene series ===
- At Death’s Door (1955)
- Death of Cold (1956)
- Dead for a Ducat (1956)
- Dead Man’s Shoes (1958). Repr Academy Chicago Publishers, 1987.
- A Louse for the Hangman (1958)
- Our Jubilee Is Death (1959). Repr Academy Chicago Publishers, 1986.
- Furious Old Women (1960). Repr Academy Chicago Publishers, 1983.
- Jack on the Gallows Tree (1960)
- Die All, Die Merrily (1961). Repr Academy Chicago Publishers, 1987.
- A Bone and a Hank of Hair (1961) Repr Academy Chicago Publishers, 1985.
- Nothing Like Blood (1962)
- Crack of Doom (1963), a.k.a. Such Is Death. Repr Academy Chicago Publishers, 1986.
- Death in Albert Park (1964)
- Death at Hallows End (1965) (reprinted in paperback by Academy Chicago Publishers, May 2008)
- Death on the Black Sands (1966)
- Death of a Commuter (1967). Repr Academy Chicago Publishers, 1988.
- Death at St. Asprey’s School (1967). Repr Academy Chicago Publishers, 1984.
- Death on Romney Marsh (1968)
- Death with Blue Ribbon (1969). Repr Academy Chicago Publishers, 1994.
- Death on Allhallowe’en (1970). Repr Academy Chicago Publishers, 1988.
- Death by the Lake (1971)
- Death in the Middle Watch (1974). Repr Academy Chicago Publishers, 2004.
- Death of a Bovver Boy (1974). Repr Academy Chicago Publishers, 2014.

== Bibliography ==
- Murder Will Out: The Detective in Fiction, T. J. Binyon (Oxford, 1989) ISBN 0-19-219223-X pp. 54,123
