= Adrienne Ellis =

Canadian-born American-actress

- Born: 1941; Canada
- Died: December 6, 2019 (aged 77–78)
- Other name: Adrianne Ellis
- Occupation: Actress
- Years active: 1960–2013
- Spouses: Glen Corbett (m. 1966; div. 1975) Michael Anderson (m. 1977; died 2018)
- Children: 2, including Laurie Holden

Adrienne Ellis (died December 6, 2019), also known as Adrianne Ellis, was a Canadian actress.

== Early life ==
Ellis was born in Canada and raised in California. She attended Van Nuys High School, where she was president of the honors drama society. She went on to study at UCLA, where she distinguished herself in the theater and acted in the first student film directed by then fellow student Francis Ford Coppola.

== Career ==
Ellis began her career in 1960 when she played Shirley on the TV series Dan Raven. In 1965, she played Myra Finlay in the Perry Mason episode "The Case of the Cheating Chancellor". Other credits include the TV shows Suspicion, The Virginian, Morning Star (1965-1966), and the movie The New Interns.

During the 1960s, she lived at the Hollywood Studio Club. Her roommate was model Gloria Dawn. Her other stage roles include Nora in The Doll's House and Desdemona, opposite William Marshall's Othello. She produced a theatrical version of The Servant starring Keir Dullea at the former Bayview Playhouse in Toronto and co-produced Rugged Gold, a family movie directed by Michael Anderson.

== Personal life ==
Ellis was the wife of actor Glen Corbett. After her divorce from him, she married, in 1977, British film director Michael Anderson (Around the World in 80 Days, Logan's Run).

Ellis is the mother of actress Laurie Holden (The X-Files, Silent Hill, The Mist, The Walking Dead) and actor/assistant director Christopher Holden.

== Select filmography ==
- The Tom Ewell Show (1960) .... Mrs. Sidney
- Dan Raven (episode Buy a Nightmare) (1960) .... Shirley
- The Detectives Starring Robert Taylor (episode Quiet Night) (1961) .... Ruth
- The Donna Reed Show (episode Military School) (1961) .... Claudette
- The Gertrude Berg Show (2 episodes) (1961) .... Laurie
- Straightaway (episode A Moment in the Sun) (1962) .... Jennifer
- The Dick Powell Show (episode 330 Independence S.W.) (1962) .... Connie
- The New Interns (1964) .... Nurse
- Billie (1965)
- The Alfred Hitchcock Hour (episode Thanatos Palace Hotel) (1965) .... The Young Woman
- The Virginian (episode Legend for a Lawman) (1965) .... Nora Buckman
- Perry Mason (episode The Case of Cheating Chancellor) (1965) .... Myra Finlay
- Morning Star (12 episodes) (1965–1966) .... Jan Elliott
- Major Crimes (2013) (episode Pick your Poison) .... Irina Pushkin
