= Okefenokee (film) =

1959 American black and white drama film

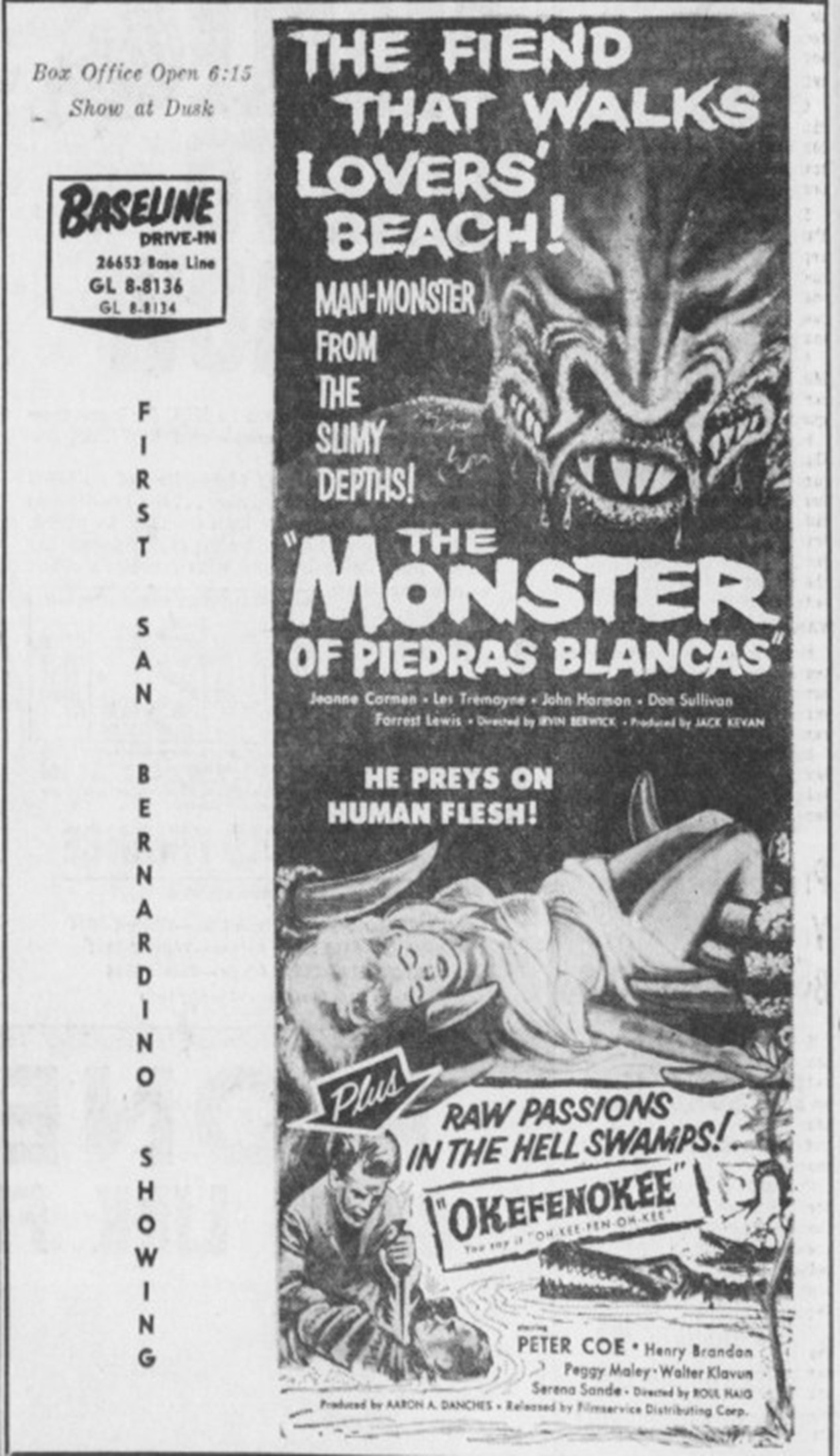
Poster of the double feature release

Okefenokee is a 1959 American black and white drama film directed by Roul Haig. The cast includes Peter Coe (born in Yugoslavia) in the main role (a Seminole G.I.), Henry Brandon and Serena Sande.

Okefenokee was released as a double feature with The Monster of Piedras Blancas. The latter, a horror film, and Okefenokee, whose genre contains elements of both melodrama and crime film, have however little in common.

== Plot ==
Chekika, a Seminole, returns to his home in the Everglades after serving in the U.S. Army. While he was away, smuggling and violence have increased in the Okefenokee Swamp. Chekika and his fiancée and family face the gang who is responsible for the new situation and crimes.

=== Voice over ===
Elements of the Seminole culture are explained throughout the film by a voice over when the plot demands it.

== Production ==
=== Roul Haig ===
The film was Haig's directorial debut. His second and only other film as director would be The Wacky World of Dr. Morgus (1962), his only other contribution to the film industry being the story for Windjammer in 1937 (under the name of Major Raoul Haig).

=== Working/alternative titles ===
The script mentions Mangrove as working title. The British Film Institute mentions Indian Killer as alternative title.

== Filming ==
According to Filmfacts, the film was filmed in Florida and Georgia.

== Film release ==
The film was theatrically released in November 1959.

== See also ==
- Swamp Water, a 1941 film also set in the Okefenokee swamp, but focusing more on White poors of Georgia

== Bibliography ==
- The Motion Picture Guide (1985), p. 2230.
