= Michael Anderson (director) =

English film director (1920–2018)

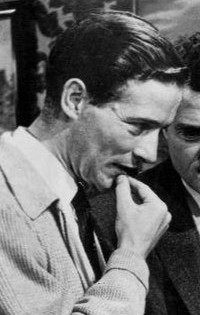
- Anderson in 1956
- Born: Michael Joseph Anderson; 30 January 1920; London, United Kingdom
- Died: 25 April 2018 (aged 98); Vancouver, Canada
- Citizenship: United Kingdom; Canada (after 1981)
- Occupation: Director
- Years active: 1949–1999
- Notable work: The Dam Busters; Around the World in 80 Days; Logan's Run
- Spouses: Betty Jordan (m. 1939) Vera Carlisle (m. 1969, divorced) Adrienne Ellis (m. 1977; died 2018)
- Children: 2, including Michael Anderson Jr.
- Relatives: Laurie Holden (stepdaughter); Christopher Holden (stepson)

Michael Joseph Anderson Sr (30 January 1920 – 25 April 2018) was an English film and television director. His career spanned nearly 50 years across three countries, working at various times in the United Kingdom, the United States, and Canada. His most critically and commercially successful works include the World War II film The Dam Busters (1955), the dystopian sci-fi film Logan's Run (1976), and the comedy adventure epic Around the World in 80 Days (1956), which won the 1957 Academy Award for Best Picture.

Anderson received nominations for the Best Director Oscar and the Golden Globe for Best Director for Around the World in 80 Days. He was twice nominated for the Hugo Award for Best Dramatic Presentation (for Logan's Run and for the Ray Bradbury miniseries The Martian Chronicles), and for a Directors Guild of America Award and the Palme d'Or. In 2012, he received the Directors Guild of Canada's Lifetime Achievement Award.

Anderson was the father of actor Michael Anderson Jr., and the stepfather of actress Laurie Holden.

== Early life and education ==
Anderson was born in London, United Kingdom, to a theatrical family. His parents were the actors Lawrence (1893–1939) and Beatrice Anderson (1893–1977). His great-aunt was Mary Anderson of Louisville, Kentucky, who became one of the first US Shakespearean actresses; the Mary Anderson Theatre in Louisville was dedicated to her.

He began working in the industry as an actor during the 1930s. By 1938, he had graduated to working behind the camera as an assistant director. During World War II, while serving in the British Army's Royal Signals Corps, he met Peter Ustinov and subsequently assisted him on two films.

== Actor and assistant director ==
Anderson appeared in two films as an actor: as Oily Boyd in Housemaster (1938); and as Marine Albert Fosdick in Noël Coward's In Which We Serve (1942). He joined Elstree Studios as a production runner in 1936 and became an assistant director by 1938.

His credits as assistant director include Spy for a Day (1940), Freedom Radio (1940), Quiet Wedding (1941), Cottage to Let (1941) and Jeannie (1941). He was unit manager as well as actor on In Which We Serve (1942) and was assistant director on Unpublished Story (1942).

Anderson served with the Royal Corps of Signals during the Second World War, during which time he met Peter Ustinov. On demobilisation, Anderson returned to the film industry working as an assistant director on Ustinov's films School for Secrets (1946) and Vice Versa (1947). He was also an assistant director on Fame is the Spur (1947), One Night with You (1947) and Mr. Perrin and Mr. Traill (1948).

== Director ==
Anderson and Ustinov then wrote and directed a feature together, Private Angelo (1949). "He's an old friend of mine and we've always got each other out of difficulties," said Ustinov.

Anderson made his solo directorial debut with a B film, Waterfront (1950) with Robert Newton and Richard Burton. The Telegraph critic announced, "I can only burn my boats and prophesy that young Michael Anderson is possibly the most promising discovery since Carol Reed and David Lean."

Anderson followed his first at bat with some more B movies: Hell Is Sold Out (1951) for producer Raymond Stross; Night Was Our Friend (1952) and Dial 17 (1952). In early 1952 he co directed a stage revue in London, The Irving Revue.

=== Associated British Picture Corporation ===
In April 1952 Anderson signed a contract with Associated British Picture Corporation (ABPC) for whom he wound up making five films. The first was a comedy, Will Any Gentleman...? (1953), based on a stage success. It was followed by The House of the Arrow (1953).

The third was the war film The Dam Busters (1955), starring Richard Todd. Todd recalled when first told Anderson was to direct "I thought this was typical ABPC cheese-paring, instead of getting an expensive well-known director. Michael had made only small films before that, having previously been the best first assistant director in the business. But I had dinner with him one night and was totally won over by him. He knew what he was doing and was a delight to work with." The Dam Busters was the most popular movie at the British box office in 1955.

Todd worked twice more with Anderson, calling him "a supremely authoritative, quiet, collected director who knew exactly what he wanted and what he could get out of his actors. He only had to give me a little quiet guidance, and we worked together very well."

Anderson followed this with the first cinema adaptation of George Orwell's 1984 (1956), co-financed by American interests. It was a commercial failure, despite shooting a "happier" ending for the United States release.

== International director ==
=== Around the World in 80 Days ===
Anderson was then called in to direct Around the World in 80 Days (1956), after original director John Farrow had a falling out with producer Mike Todd. Todd reportedly hired him on the strength of The Dam Busters and the recommendation of Noël Coward. The film was a huge hit and Anderson was nominated for an Academy Award (the film won Best Picture) and a Golden Globe for his direction. Todd signed Anderson to a two-picture contract but Todd died in a plane crash in 1958.

Anderson was reunited with Richard Todd for another war film Yangtse Incident: The Story of H.M.S. Amethyst (1957) for producer Herbert Wilcox but it was not as popular as The Dam Busters.

He made a third film with Richard Todd, a thriller, Chase a Crooked Shadow (1958); this was his fifth and last movie for Associated British.

In Ireland Anderson made a thriller about the IRA with James Cagney, Shake Hands with the Devil (1959). It was made for Pennebaker, the company of Marlon Brando and provided an early role to Richard Harris.

=== Hollywood ===
Anderson then took over a project at MGM originally planned as an Alfred Hitchcock project, The Wreck of the Mary Deare (1959), with Gary Cooper and Charlton Heston. Anderson later recalled in 1986, "The magic I remember most is walking on to stage 30 in Culver City at Metro-Goldwyn-Mayer. It was the biggest stage in the world and I remember looking at it and thinking I'll be here in a couple of weeks and they'll have built a ship and I'll be directing Gary Cooper and Charlton Heston – it's all going to be mine. It gave me such a feeling of astonishment and it's never quite left me."

MGM also financed Anderson's next film, the melodrama All the Fine Young Cannibals (1960) with Natalie Wood and Robert Wagner. Anderson was reunited with Cooper in The Naked Edge (1961) which turned out to be Cooper's last film.

Harold Pinter wrote The Servant for Anderson but the director was unable to secure finance so he sold the script to Joseph Losey, who filmed it with great success in 1963.

Anderson made some films for Harold Hecht: Flight from Ashiya (1964), an adventure tale, and Wild and Wonderful (1964), a comedy with Tony Curtis. For MGM and Carlo Ponti he directed the war time thriller Operation Crossbow (1965).

Anderson made a spy thriller The Quiller Memorandum (1966), starring George Segal and Alec Guinness. He was meant to direct Eye of the Devil but fell ill. For MGM he directed the film The Shoes of the Fisherman (1968), stepping in for Anthony Asquith at the last moment; the film was a flop.

He was meant to direct the big screen adaptation of James Clavell's Tai Pan starring Patrick McGoohan but the film was not made due to high costs.

=== 1970s ===
Anderson went for a few years without making a film before returning with Pope Joan (1972) and The Devil's Impostor (1972). For George Pal he made Doc Savage: The Man of Bronze (1975) then did Conduct Unbecoming (1975).

Logan's Run (1976), about a futuristic society where humanity is imprisoned in a death trap sealed dome controlled by a computer, was an expensive box-office success, earning $50 million worldwide and boosting sales for its distributor, Metro Goldwyn Mayer. Anderon's old friend Peter Ustinov played a small role. Anderson then directed Orca (1977) and Dominique (1978).

== Later work ==
In 1981, Anderson moved to Canada, where his then-wife was from, and became a Canadian citizen. "It's the best move I ever made", he said in 1986. "There's so much talent, it's exciting, clean, young, fresh and it's been very good to me."

His later work was mostly made-for-television miniseries, including The Martian Chronicles (1980), Sword of Gideon (1986), Young Catherine (1991), The Sea Wolf (1993), Rugged Gold (1994), Captain's Courageous (1996) and 20,000 Leagues Under the Sea (1997).

His feature work in Canada included, Murder by Phone (1982), the New Zealand film, Second Time Lucky (1984), Separate Vacations (1986), Summer of the Monkeys (1998), Millennium (1989) and The Grand Defiance (1993), as well as episodes of the television anthology series Scales of Justice. He directed Bottega dell'orefice (The Jeweler's Shop, 1988), based on the 1960 play written by Karol Wojtyła, who, by the time the film was made, had become Pope John Paul II. In 1998, he said "I honestly feel like a teenager", and had no intention of retiring. Despite this statement, his last film credit would end up being The New Adventures of Pinocchio (1999).

In 2012, Michael Anderson received the Lifetime Achievement Award from the Directors Guild of Canada. At the time of his death, Anderson was the oldest living nominee for an Academy Award for Best Director, and the only surviving director whose film won a Best Picture award in the 1950s.

== Personal life ==
Anderson was married three times:

1. Betty Jordan (1923–2008) married in 1939; five children
2. Vera Carlisle (born 1935) married in 1969; one child
3. Actress Adrienne Ellis (1944-2019); two stepchildren; stepfather of actress Laurie Holden (The X-Files, Silent Hill, The Mist, The Walking Dead) and Christopher Holden.

His son Michael Anderson Jr., is an actor who appeared in Logan's Run and The Martian Chronicles; another son, David Anderson, is a film producer.

Anderson died on 25 April 2018 at the age of 98, from heart disease.

== Filmography ==
- Private Angelo (1949)
- Waterfront Women (1950)
- Hell Is Sold Out (1951)
- Night Was Our Friend (1951)
- Will Any Gentleman...? (1953)
- The House of the Arrow (1953)
- The Dam Busters (1955)
- 1984 (1956)
- Around the World in 80 Days (1956)
- Yangtse Incident: The Story of H.M.S. Amethyst (1957)
- Chase a Crooked Shadow (1958)
- Shake Hands with the Devil (1959)
- The Wreck of the Mary Deare (1959)
- All the Fine Young Cannibals (1960)
- The Naked Edge (1961)
- Flight from Ashiya (1964)
- Wild and Wonderful (1964)
- Operation Crossbow (1965)
- The Quiller Memorandum (1966)
- The Shoes of the Fisherman (1968)
- Pope Joan (1972)
- Doc Savage: The Man of Bronze (1975)
- Conduct Unbecoming (1975)
- Logan's Run (1976)
- Orca (1977)
- Dominique (1979)
- The Martian Chronicles (1980) (TV)
- Murder by Phone (1982)
- Second Time Lucky (1984)
- Separate Vacations (1986)
- Sword of Gideon (1986) (TV)
- The Jeweller's Shop (1989)
- Millennium (1989)
- Young Catherine (1991) (TV)
- The Sea Wolf (1993) (TV)
- Rugged Gold (1994) (TV)
- Captains Courageous (1996) (TV)
- 20,000 Leagues Under the Sea (1997) (TV)
- Summer of the Monkeys (1998)
- The New Adventures of Pinocchio (1999)
