= Edie Landau =

American film producer (1927–2022)

Edythe Landau (née Rudolph; July 15, 1927 – December 24, 2022) was an American film and television producer and executive, known for such films as Long Day's Journey Into Night, The Pawnbroker, King: A Filmed Record...Montgomery to Memphis, The Chosen and the fourteen movies of the American Film Theatre which she produced with her husband Ely Landau.

== Early life and career ==
Landau was born to a Jewish family and raised in Wilkes-Barre, Pennsylvania, the daughter of Rose and Harry Rudolph (former president of the Eastern Basketball League) and sister to Mendy Rudolph (2007 inductee to the Basketball Hall of Fame). She received her B.A. in Education from Wilkes University. In 1948, Landau moved to New York City, where she served as production coordinator for Phillips H. Lord, on such popular radio shows as Gangbusters and Mr. District Attorney, among others.

In 1953, Landau joined (and later married) Ely Landau in his start-up company National Telefilm Associates which owned television station WNTA Channel 13 in NYC, considered the "fourth TV network" in the early days of television. Until 1961, Edie Landau served as the company's Executive Vice President, overseeing the station's original programming including the anthology drama series The Play of the Week, The Mike Wallace Show, The David Susskind Show, Open End, The Bishop Sheen Show, and One Night Stand, among others.

In 1962, the Landaus produced Long Day's Journey Into Night, an adaptation of the Eugene O'Neill play directed by Sidney Lumet, which won Best Actor awards for all its leading actors at the 1962 Cannes Film Festival, as well as an Academy Award nomination for Katharine Hepburn as Best Actress. This was followed in 1964 by The Pawnbroker (Golden Globe Award winner and Academy Award nomination for Rod Steiger as Best Actor), The Madwoman of Chaillot (1969) also with Hepburn, and the documentary King: a Filmed Record...Montgomery to Memphis (1970). The film about the Rev. Martin Luther King Jr. played in 663 theaters as a one-night benefit for King's charities, was nominated for an Academy Award for Best Documentary Feature, and in 1999 was added to the National Film Registry.

In 1973, the Landaus launched the American Film Theatre, bringing two seasons of outstanding stage plays to the motion picture screen as part of a subscription series. The fourteen movies of the American Film Theatre included Edward Albee's A Delicate Balance (the Landaus' third collaboration with Katharine Hepburn), O'Neill's The Iceman Cometh, Pinter's The Homecoming, and Robert Shaw's The Man in the Glass Booth (with a Best Actor Academy Award nomination for Maximilian Schell).

== Later career ==
From the late 1970s through the 1980s, Landau produced such films as Hopscotch (with Walter Matthau and Glenda Jackson), Beatlemania, Chaim Potok's The Chosen, Robert Ludlum’s The Holcroft Covenant (with Michael Caine), in addition to a number of award-winning productions for HBO, including The Deadly Game (with George Segal and Robert Morley), Separate Tables (with Alan Bates and Julie Christie), Mr. Halpern and Mr. Johnson (with Laurence Olivier and Jackie Gleason) and The Christmas Wife (with Jason Robards and Julie Harris).

In 1982, while continuing her producing career, Landau graduated from the University of West Los Angeles School of Law, and became a member of the State Bar of California.

In 1989, Landau also began operating Nannies Unlimited Agency, an exclusive Beverly Hills placement service with clientele including numerous celebrities of the entertainment world. In 2014, she published an original volume of poems, Smiles for Seniors: And Anyone Else Who Can Poke Fun at Themselves.

== Personal life and death ==
In addition to the two young sons her husband Ely A. Landau brought to the marriage (Neil and Les Landau), the Landaus had three children together: Jon Landau (producer of such films as Titanic and Avatar), Tina Landau (renowned theater writer and director), and Kathy Landau (Executive Director of Symphony Space in New York City).

Landau died from natural causes on December 24, 2022, at the age of 95.
