= Galileo (1975 film) =

1975 film by Joseph Losey

- Theatrical release poster (1974)
- Directed by: Joseph Losey
- Written by: Joseph Losey; Barbara Bray
- Based on: Galileo (1943 play) by Bertolt Brecht with Charles Laughton (trans.)
- Produced by: Ely Landau
- Starring: Topol; Georgia Brown; Edward Fox; John Gielgud; Margaret Leighton
- Cinematography: Michael Reed
- Edited by: Reginald Beck
- Music by: Hanns Eisler; Richard Hartley
- Production company: Ely Landau Organization; American Express Films; Cinevision
- Distributed by: American Film Theatre
- Release dates: 27 January 1975 (New York City, premiere); 27 May 1976 (UK)
- Running time: 144 minutes
- Country: United States; United Kingdom; Canada
- Language: English
- Box office: $1.2 million

Galileo (also known as Bertolt Brecht's Galileo) is a 1975 historical biographical drama film directed and co-written by Joseph Losey, about the 16th- and 17th-century scientist Galileo Galilei, whose astronomical observations with the newly invented telescope led to a profound conflict with the Roman Catholic Church. The film stars an ensemble cast, led by Topol in the titular role, along with Georgia Brown, Edward Fox, John Gielgud, Margaret Leighton, Colin Blakely, Clive Revill, Michael Lonsdale, Patrick Magee and Tom Conti.

Adapted from Bertolt Brecht's 1943 play, the film was produced by Ely Landau for the American Film Theatre, which presented 13 adaptations of plays in the United States from 1973 to 1975. Brecht's play was then-recently called a "masterpiece" by veteran theater critic Michael Billington, as Martin Esslin had in 1960. Losey had also directed the first performances of the play in 1947 in the US — with Brecht's active participation. The film is fairly true to those first performances, and is thus of historical significance as well.

== Plot ==
The film closely follows the "American" version of Brecht's play Galileo. In 1609 Galileo is a mathematics professor in Padua, Italy. While his salary is inadequate, he possesses the freedom to pursue controversial scientific studies under the protection of the Venetian Republic. Part of his work involves the use of a telescope, a relatively new scientific instrument brought from the Netherlands. Using the telescope, Galileo seeks to test the theories put forth by Nicolaus Copernicus that place the Sun – and not the Earth – at the centre of universe. As his research progresses, Galileo accepts a more prestigious academic position in Florence. But his new position does not come with the government protection he enjoyed in Venice, and his friends in the higher echelons of the Roman Catholic Church refuse to come to his aid when he is summoned before the Inquisition.

== Cast ==
Credits from AFI Catalog of Feature Films:

- Topol as Galileo Galilei
- Colin Blakely as Priuli
- Clive Revill as the Ballad Singer
- Georgia Brown as the Ballad Singer's Wife
- Edward Fox as the Cardinal Inquisitor
- John Gielgud as the Old Inquisitor
- Margaret Leighton as the Elderly Court Lady
- Michael Lonsdale as Cardinal Maffeo Barberini, the future Pope Urban VIII
- Patrick Magee as Cardinal Robert Bellarmine
- John McEnery as Federzoni
- Tom Conti as Andrea Sarti
  - Iain Travers as Andrea as a boy
- Michael Gough as Giovanni Francesco Sagredo
- Mary Larkin as Virginia
- Richard O'Callaghan as Fulganzio
- Judy Parfitt as Angelica Sarti
- Tim Woodward as Ludovico Marsili
- Ian Hoare as Cosimo II de' Medici
- Ronald Radd as Vanni
- Henry Woolf as Clavius
- Madeline Smith as a Young Court Lady
- Vernon Dobtcheff as First Secretary
- James Aubrey and Job Stewart as Monk-Scholars

== Production ==
=== Development and screenplay ===
Losey had a long relationship with Brecht that commenced in the 1930s and culminated with the 1947 stage performances of Galileo. After these, Losey mainly worked as a film director. Losey was blacklisted in the US in the early 1950s due to his political activities, which effectively ended his career in the US film industry. He emigrated to England, where he was able to re-establish his career. Over the years he made several efforts to produce a film based on Brecht's play. These were finally realized when Losey was engaged to direct a film of Galileo for the 1974–1975 season of the American Film Theatre. In its two seasons, American Film Theater presented thirteen film adaptations based on well-known plays. By design, these were not films of stage productions — they were plays "translated to the film medium, but with complete faithfulness to the original play script." While the films were intended for US movie theaters, Galileo was produced in England.

The screenplay for Galileo was written by Barbara Bray and Losey. Bray had a long career as an editor, translator, and critic. She is also noted as the longtime companion and mistress of Samuel Beckett, who won the Nobel Prize in Literature in 1969. Besides Galileo, she wrote two other screenplays with Losey. Their screenplay for Galileo relies primarily on the "American" version of Brecht's play that was first performed in 1947. This English language version was written between 1944 and 1947 by Brecht with Charles Laughton, his collaborator and translator. The play was produced in Los Angeles, California and then in New York City, with Laughton (a famed film actor) starring as Galileo. The play was first published in 1952. Bray and Losey's screenplay made changes in this version that reflect the ultimate 1956 "Berlin version" (in German), as well as the English translation of the Berlin version and additional materials published by Ralph Manheim and John Willett in 1972. Scene 14 from the 1947 play was dropped from the film version.

For the film, Losey maintained several theatrical concepts that had been part of the 1947 theatrical production. These included the use of a trio of young boys whose songs preview parts of the plot, and also the staging of Galileo's recantation against a shadow-filled white screen (cyclorama). Losey's opening shot, an overhead view of the film sound stage, also calls attention to the theatricality of the production. At times, the film's characters speak directly at the camera to address the audience.

=== Casting ===
Casting for the AFT films was unusual. As described by Raymond Benson, "The talent (directors, actors, designers, technicians) was asked to work at a reduced rate or at scale. No one refused. It was for a cause they all thought was worthwhile. Lee Marvin, for example, joked that he 'lost $225,000' by starring in The Iceman Cometh (which meant his salary was $25,000—his going rate at the time was $250,000)."

Prior to casting Topol, Losey had lobbied for Rod Steiger to play the title role.

=== Music ===
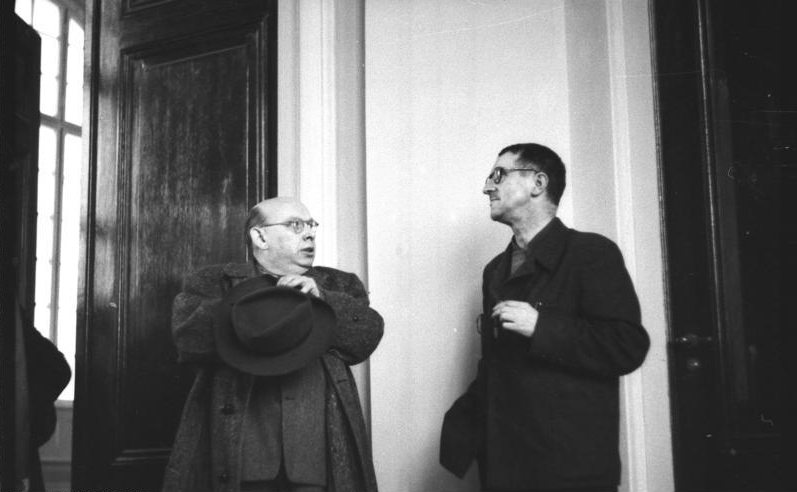
Hanns Eisler (left) and Bertolt Brecht, his close friend and collaborator, East Berlin, 1950.

For the 1947 stage production, Hanns Eisler composed music for a series of songs that were sung by a trio of boys at the beginning of each of the fourteen different scenes of the play. In addition, the ninth scene is a musical entertainment occurring on April Fool's Day, 1632. Historically, 1632 was one year before Galileo was convicted of heresy by the Roman Inquisition. The Ballad Singer and his wife sing about Galileo's effect on civil order to a rowdy crowd. Eisler composed the music for the ballad, which included orchestration for seventeen instruments. A recording of Eisler himself singing this ballad has been released, together with many other recordings related to the collaboration of Laughton, Brecht, and Eisler. Since 1930, Eisler had been Brecht's close friend and collaborator, and their collaboration continued after they had both decamped from Hollywood to East Berlin.

The film retains both the songs for boys' voices and the ballad. During production, it was discovered that the scores for most of the instruments in Eisler's orchestration of the ballad were lost. Losey had Richard Hartley finish the orchestration anew. The Ballad Singer was played by Clive Revill, and his wife by Georgia Brown. The orchestra is apparently uncredited.

=== Filming and post-production ===
Losey had overseen the 1947 theatrical productions, and was selected by Brecht himself. He gained an intimate knowledge of Brecht's intentions. Referring to the first production in Los Angeles, John Houseman said later, "Joe was to be the director of this, which really meant ... that actually Brecht would produce and direct himself with aid from Charles Laughton." James Lyon comments that "Because he was willing to learn, Losey qualified as Brecht's kind of director. He seems to have been one of the rare theater and film people in America who recognized Brecht's genius at once and at least partially understood him." Losey produced and directed the subsequent New York production after Brecht had left the US. He wrote at the time, "It is such a great play, so clean and clear and architectural ... what I have worked for and prepared for my entire life."

On April Fool's Day, thirty two,
of science there was much ado.
People had learned from Galilei:
They used his teaching in their way.

— lyric sung by the trio of boys

Losey originally planned to shoot on-location in Italy, but budgetary constraints led filming to take place at EMI-Elstree Studios instead.

=== Post-production ===
Losey's long-time collaborator Reginald Beck served as editor. Critic Tom Milne remarked that the "smooth theatrical continuity tends to blunt the raw edges of Brecht's distancing effects".

== Release ==
Galileo was the initial offering of the American Film Theatre's second season that commenced in January 1975. The film was shown at the 1975 Cannes Film Festival, but was not entered into the main competition.

=== Home media ===
DVD cover art (2003). Galileo, as played by Topol, learns to make a telescope using two lenses.

The first physical release didn't occur until 2003, when Kino International produced region 1 DVDs of all fourteen films from American Film Theatre. The Galileo DVD includes interviews with Topol and producer Otto Plaschke. The DVD box art lists different actors than were highlighted in the original 1975 theatrical release poster. The DVD transfer was reviewed by Noel Megahey in 2004.

In 2019, Kino released the film on Blu-Ray.

== Critical reception ==
Several critics have admired the film's success in adapting Brecht's important play for the cinema. Roger Ebert wrote in 1975, "Brecht's Galileo bears only a sporadic resemblance to the facts of the great man's life. But no matter: What Brecht was after, and what the new American Film Theater version of his play does a pretty good job of delivering, was a drama of ideas, not biography." Vincent Canby noted particularly the "hugely theatrical scene in which the Pope (Michael Lonsdale) is being robed for an audience and trying not to give in to the Inquisitor's arguments to do something about Galileo." Writing in 2012, Alex von Tunzelmann commented: "Adapted from Bertolt Brecht's intelligent, gutsy play, this film is a smart take on Galileo's life."

On the other hand, many critics have reacted negatively to the performance by Topol as Galileo. Jay Cocks, reviewing the film for Time in 1975, wrote: "Topol misses the role's strength, both in character and intellect. Most of the actors around him, however, are superb: John Gielgud, Margaret Leighton, Edward Fox, Patrick Magee, John McEnery." Canby, writing in The New York Times in 1975, complained: "There is one problem with the film, and it is a major one; the casting of Topol in the title role ... although he's a big man he imparts no sense of intellectual heft. ... but the rest of the production has exceptional style and intelligence, the sort of things one should be able to expect from the American Film Theater."

The original 1947 theatrical performance received a similar criticism, only then it was Charles Laughton who played Galileo. Tom Milne makes this a criticism of Losey's directing, writing that "Topol is allowed to get away with presenting Galileo as a hero, which makes nonsense of Brecht's condemnation of him as a coward for his betrayal of science". Some recent reviewers have been much more positive about Topol's performance, including von Tunzelmann and Robert Benson.

Martin Walsh added a different perspective, writing in 1975 that "Losey may not be the radical director Brecht deserves. But his production is consistently restrained and allows the incomparable intelligence of Brecht's text to thrust through to us."

The DVD release gave rise to a new round of reviews of the film, both negative and positive.

== See also ==
- Galileo (1968) is an Italian film about the Galileo affair directed by Liliana Cavani. See the article by Cristina Olivotto and Antonella Testa for a comparison of the 1968 and 1975 films.
