= In Celebration =

- DVD Cover
- Directed by: Lindsay Anderson
- Written by: David Storey
- Based on: In Celebration by David Storey
- Produced by: Ely A. Landau
- Starring: Alan Bates; Bill Owen; Brian Cox; James Bolam; Constance Chapman; Gabrielle Daye
- Cinematography: Dick Bush
- Edited by: Michael Ellis
- Music by: Christopher Gunning
- Distributed by: American Film Theatre
- Release date: March 17, 1975 (US)
- Running time: 131 minutes
- Countries: United Kingdom, United States
- Language: English

In Celebration is a 1975 British drama film directed by Lindsay Anderson and starring Alan Bates, Brian Cox, James Bolam, Bill Owen, Gabrielle Daye and Constance Chapman. It is based on the 1969 stage production of the same name by David Storey which was also directed by Anderson and starred all of the same cast members.

The movie was produced and released as part of the American Film Theatre, which adapted theatrical works for a subscription-driven cinema series. It was meant to be shown theatrically with tickets sold in advance.

== Plot ==
The film takes place in the Derbyshire mining town of Langwith. The Shaws' three sons have returned home to celebrate their 40th wedding anniversary. Mr. Shaw has been a coal miner for 49 years, and has only one year left until retirement. Mrs Shaw is the daughter of a pig breeder, meaning she came from a higher social class.

The parents urged their sons to abandon their father's trade in pursuit of professional careers, but the results have not been entirely positive. Andrew, the eldest, became a solicitor but has abandoned it to pursue painting. Colin, who was a Communist party member for a year, is now a prosperous but unfulfilled industrial relations manager for a car manufacturer, dealing with negotiations with the unions, whose only honest concession to the hollowness of his existence is his unmarried state and repressed homosexuality. The youngest brother, Steven, is a teacher, married with four children, and has abandoned a book he had been writing for several years.

The family go to an expensive restaurant, although the action is almost entirely in the couple's living room. A friendly neighbour is present for some of the scenes.

The film examines the tensions which develop over the course of one evening as the family reunite. The family recall unpleasant incidents, including a premarital pregnancy, physical abuse, child neglect, the death of the couple's first son, the mother's suicide attempt and the "turning out" (sending him to live with another family for a period of time when another sibling was born) of another son.

== Cast ==
- Brian Cox as Steven Shaw
- Gabrielle Daye as Mrs Burnett
- Bill Owen as Mr. Shaw
- James Bolam as Colin Shaw
- Alan Bates as Andrew Shaw
- Constance Chapman as Mrs. Shaw

== Reception ==
The Monthly Film Bulletin wrote: "The film version of In Celebration reunites the original cast with the original director, and their familiarity with the material shines through ... the drama is played out much as it was on the stage, and Anderson trains his camera on the actors with a theatre director's concern for the overall balance of a scene and the careful interaction of its motley participants. ... But despite the material's familiarity, the play has much cumulative power, with skeletons viciously dragged out of cupboards to the accompaniment of tersely poetic dialogue. Alan Bates has the hog-sized part as Andrew, the incessantly mocking and childish brother, but everyone has their moment of glory."

Vincent Canby, writing in The New York Times, praised Anderson for having "succeeded in making a very complete, full-bodied film of Mr. Storey's play without being tricky or intrusive...Mr. Anderson has also gotten terrific performances from everyone, especially Mr. Bates, Miss Chapman and Mr. Cox, as the most troubled of the Shaw sons."

American film critic Jay Cocks commented that "under Anderson's direction, the movie gathers enormous force, partly from the raw skill of its actors, partly from the accumulating tension of frustration; the movie has power from energy that is never released; Anderson's skill cannot make it any more complete or successful, but it does make it happen superbly well."

The Daily Hampshire Gazette wrote "it's a sharply etched deeply compassionate portrait of a family reunion fatally flawed by the specters of past guilt and present hypocrisy; Storey powerfully delves beneath the surface appearance of love and unity to reveal the diverse forces that have alienated the sons from the parents." Stanley Eichelbaum of The San Francisco Examiner stated "Anderson's astute but unobtrusive direction of the uniformly fine cast is matched by Storey's intelligent adaptation of his play, which only missed greatness by being too concerned with socio-psychoanalysis of self evident issues that don't need long speeches to explain them."

== Release ==
The film was released on DVD in 2004, as part of a five-disc collection. Sound & Vision said the "five-disc collection looks only adequate; picture quality runs the gamut from acceptable to murky; darkly lit interiors don't have much detail in the shadows; the mono sound serves up the often thrilling dialogue well enough, but without ambient effects." Edie Landau, who was the executive in charge of the American Film Theatre, recalls on a supplementary interview on the DVDs, that no actor was paid more than $25,000 and no director more than $30,000.
