= Richard Kaplan =

Richard Kaplan may refer to:

- Richard Kaplan (golfer), South African golfer
- Richard Kaplan (film producer), American documentary film and television writer, director, and producer
- Rick Kaplan, American television producer
