= Mr. Halpern and Mr. Johnson =

1983 American made-for-television drama film

- Genre: Comedy; Drama
- Written by: Lionel Goldstein
- Directed by: Alvin Rakoff
- Starring: Laurence Olivier; Jackie Gleason
- Countries of origin: United Kingdom; United States
- Original language: English

Production
- Executive producers: Mort Abrahams; Colin Callender; Patrick Dromgoole
- Producers: Edie Landau; Ely Landau
- Production location: Bristol, England
- Cinematography: Gary Penny
- Editor: Peter Buchanan
- Running time: 60 minutes
- Production companies: Ely & Edie Productions

Original release
- Network: HBO
- Release: August 28, 1983

Mr. Halpern and Mr. Johnson is a 1983 American made-for-television drama film produced for HBO starring Laurence Olivier and Jackie Gleason and was directed by Alvin Rakoff.

== Plot ==
The film is a two-person drama featuring Olivier as Mr. Joseph Halpern, an elderly working class British Jewish widower and Gleason as Mr. Ernest Johnson, a dapper American retired accountant. At the funeral of his wife, Florence, Mr. Halpern meets Mr. Johnson, who surprises him with the disclosure that he and Florence had maintained a close friendship for the last 40 years. Six weeks later, Mr. Halpern and Mr. Johnson meet for a drink at a hotel. A long conversation ensues that reveals aspects of himself and one has been in love with the other's wife for 30 years. At the end, Mr. Halpern and Mr. Johnson agree to meet again.

There are two locations in the movie: a New York hotel and a New Jersey cemetery. The hotel scene was filmed at the HTV West Studio on Bath Road in Bristol, England and the cemetery scenes were filmed outside Bristol.

== Cast ==
- Laurence Olivier as Joseph "Joe" Halpern
- Jackie Gleason as Ernest Johnson
