= Gabrielle Daye =

English actress (1911–2005)

- Born: 2 October 1911; Manchester, Lancashire, England
- Died: 5 January 2005 (aged 93); Essex, England
- Occupation: Actress
- Years active: 1945-1989

Gabrielle Daye (2 October 1911 – 5 January 2005) was an English theatre, television and ilm actress, notable for her TV role as Mrs. Pring on Bless Me, Father.

== Early life ==
Daye was born in Manchester, England and attended Notre Dame High School for Girls, and trained at the Mordern Gray Academy, Manchester.

== Career ==
=== Television and film ===
Daye's notable television appearances include Coronation Street (as Beattie Pearson in 1961, 1969, 1971, 1975, 1981, 1983–1984), The War of Darkie Pilbeam (1968), Persuasion (1971), Survivors (Long Live The King, 1977), Dear Enemy (1981), Juliet Bravo (John the Lad, 1983), Ever Decreasing Circles (The Tea Party and The New Neighbour, 1984), Bleak House (1985) and A Very British Coup (1988).

She also appeared in the feature films 10 Rillington Place (1971), Sunday Bloody Sunday (1971), Don't Just Lie There, Say Something! (1974), Cry Wolf (1980) and No Surrender (1985).

=== Theatre ===
Daye started her early career in theatre at The Manchester Reportory Company with productions of When We Are Married and Love on the Dole.

She appeared in The Glass Slipper as well as Eden End directed by Laurence Olivier

On stage, she was in the original Royal Court production of David Storey's In Celebration in 1969 for director Lindsay Anderson; and she reprised her role in his film version in 1975. She worked again for Anderson in the long running Ben Travers farce The Bed Before Yesterday at London's Lyric Theatre in 1975.

== Filmography ==
| Year | Title | Role | Notes |
|---|---|---|---|
| 1945 | Twilight Hour | Housemaid | Uncredited |
| 1949 | Saints and Sinners | Maeve's Mother | Uncredited |
| 1952 | Little Big Shot | | Uncredited |
| 1961-1984 | Coronation Street | Beattie Pearson (née Tatlock) | 26 episodes |
| 1968 | Chitty Chitty Bang Bang | Lady-in-Waiting | Uncredited |
| 1971 | 10 Rillington Place | Mrs. Lynch | |
| 1971 | Sunday Bloody Sunday | Wife at Hospital | |
| 1972 | The Frighteners | Daisy Cartwright | 'Bed and Breakfast', episode |
| 1974 | Don't Just Lie There, Say Something! | Elderly lady | |
| 1975 | In Celebration | Mrs. Burnett | |
| 1975 | Sunset over the Bay | Mam | |
| 1975 | I Didn't Know You Cared | Great Aunt Mona | |
| 1985 | No Surrender | Winnie | |
