= Butley (film) =

1974 American-British film by Harold Pinter

- Theatrical release poster
- Directed by: Harold Pinter
- Written by: Simon Gray
- Produced by: Ely Landau
- Starring: Alan Bates; Jessica Tandy; Richard O'Callaghan
- Cinematography: Gerry Fisher
- Edited by: Malcolm Cooke
- Distributed by: American Film Theatre
- Release dates: January 21, 1974 (US); April 1976 (UK)
- Running time: 129 minutes
- Countries: United States; United Kingdom
- Language: English

Butley is a 1974 American-British drama film directed by Harold Pinter and starring Alan Bates, Jessica Tandy, Richard O'Callaghan, Susan Engel, and Michael Byrne. It was adapted by Simon Gray from his 1971 play of same name. It was produced by Ely Landau and released through Landau's American Film Theatre.

== Plot ==
The title character, a literature professor and longtime T. S. Eliot scholar with a recently developed interest in Beatrix Potter, is a suicidal alcoholic, who loses his wife and his male lover on the same day. The dark comedy encompasses several hours in which he bullies students, friends, and colleagues, while falling apart at the seams. Apart from an opening sequence of Butley waking in the flat he shares with Joey, with a hangover and taking the Underground and occasional shots in the corridor and the pub at lunchtime, the entire film takes place in Butley's office also shared with Joey who is unable to do any work while Butley shouts and cajoles in turn. We discover progressively, scene after scene, mostly in the presence of Joey, that he lives with Joey, a past student now his assistant whom he had 'groomed' as he perversely put it himself ("I watched your neck while you were shaving"), fresh from high school, to be his long-suffering companion. We learn that Joey's tenure hangs on Butley's will. On that day, as another character, Reg, puts it, he undergoes two, even three divorces: with his ephemeral wife, with Joey, who reveals he has met someone else (Reg, whose name Butley pretends to ignore), and with a new undergraduate Butley has managed to lure away from his tutor, Edna. This pattern culminates in some of the most homophobic language ever heard on film, with a long, loud, unremitting deluge of expletives and vulgarities — until he is punched by Reg. Joey, who expresses compassion and is about to fall into the trap, then collects himself, and, literally, collects his belongings and moves to a new, tiny office vacated by Edna. The break-up is final, at home and at work. The film ends with Butley starting a tutorial with the new student, then turning against him, and hurling abuse at him. The student, first leaves with a look of clear despise. The homosexual abuse was first hinted at when Butley called the chair "a fairy queen".

In his introduction to the trade edition of the play, the film's director Harold Pinter wrote:

Simon Gray asked me to direct Butley in 1970. I found its savage, lacerating wit hard to beat and accepted the invitation. . . . The extraordinary thing about Butley, it still seems to me, is that the play gives us a character who hurls himself towards the destruction while living, in the fever of his intellectual hell, with a vitality and brilliance known to few of us. He courts death by remaining ruthlessly – even dementedly – alive. It's a remarkable creation and Alan Bates as Butley gave the performance of a lifetime.

== Cast ==
- Alan Bates as Ben Butley
- Jessica Tandy as Edna Shaft
- Richard O'Callaghan as Joey Keyston
- Susan Engel as Anne Butley
- Michael Byrne as Reg Nuttall
- Georgina Hale as Miss Heasman
- Simon Rouse as Mr. Gardner
- John Savident as James
- Oliver Maguire as train passenger
- Colin Haigh as male student
- Darien Angadi as male student

== Production ==
The film was shot at Shepperton Studios. The Executive Producer was Otto Plaschkes and the cinematographer was Gerry Fisher.

== Reception ==
The Monthly Film Bulletin wrote: "Generically speaking, Ben Butley is an all-too-familiar breed: by Lucky Jim out of Jimmy Porter, he stands, like the hero of Osborne's Inadmissible Evidence, poised with inbred pugnacity on the brink of total disintegration. His tirade of invective, delivered with lacerating relish by Alan Bates, beautifully modulated by Pinter's sense of timing, and cunningly backlighted by the now obligatory touch of cosy professional outrage ... is often very funny and always easy on the ear. One is left, however, with the uncomfortable feeling that it is all much ado about the same old thing: the articulate attack on Establishment attitudes in favour of unspecified values, the plea for human relationships rather than social conveniences, even the sense that there are no good brave causes left, literary or otherwise.... Arguably, in a play about an English lecturer, literary allusions are justified as more than mere cultural name-dropping. ... It may well be that the very discreet 'opening out' of both Simon Gray's play (mainly in the opening sequence) and Harold Pinter's stage production (mostly in the somewhat arbitrary use of cuts and close-ups) ... gnaws destructive little holes in the theatrical conventions. At any rate, one becomes increasingly aware of the artifice which keeps Ben Butley tied to his office while assorted messengers arrive with the news, in confirmation of his self-diagnosis that "One likes people to be consistent, otherwise one will start coming adrift", that the world is moving on through the changing circumstances of everyone close to him."

== See also ==
- List of American films of 1974
