= Lost in the Stars (1974 film) =

1974 film by Daniel Mann

- Theatrical poster
- Directed by: Daniel Mann
- Written by: Alfred Hayes; Maxwell Anderson (play); Alan Paton (novel)
- Produced by: Ely A. Landau
- Starring: Brock Peters; Melba Moore; Raymond St. Jacques; Paula Kelly
- Cinematography: Robert B. Hauser
- Edited by: Walter Hannemann
- Music by: Kurt Weill
- Distributed by: American Film Theatre
- Release date: April 8, 1974 (US)
- Running time: 107 minutes
- Country: United States
- Language: English

Lost in the Stars is a 1974 American film version of the Kurt Weill-Maxwell Anderson musical adaptation of the Alan Paton novel Cry, the Beloved Country. The film was produced and released as part of the American Film Theatre, which adapted theatrical works for a subscription-driven cinema series.

== Plot ==
Directed by Daniel Mann, the film follows a Zulu preacher, Reverend Stephen Kumalo (Brock Peters), in his journey to Johannesburg, Union of South Africa to search for his long-missing son, Absalom (Clifton Davis). He discovers his son is a paroled felon living in a township with his pregnant girlfriend (Melba Moore). Absolom becomes involved in a robbery plan that results in the death of a white civil and Indigenous rights advocate. Absolom is jailed, tried and sentenced to death, leaving his father unable to continue his ministerial work.

== Cast ==
- Brock Peters as Reverend Stephen Kumalo
- Melba Moore as Irina
- Raymond St. Jacques as John Kumalo
- Clifton Davis as Absalom
- Paul Rogers as James Jarvis
- Paula Kelly as Rose
- Paulene Myers as Grace Kumalo
- John Williams as Judge
- Alan Weeks as Matthew

== Production ==
Due to the film's criticism of the apartheid system, it could not be shot on location in South Africa, requiring exterior footage to be shot in Cottage Grove, Oregon.

== Critical response ==
Lost in the Stars has been poorly received by critics. At the time of its release, Vincent Canby of The New York Times called it "a very bad movie" and questioned why the film version dropped the reconciliation between Reverend Kumalo and the murdered man's father, which was integral to the Paton novel and the original stage version.

When the film was released on DVD in 2003, its received more unfavorable reviews. Time Out New York called it "a series of well-intentioned clichés" while Film Threat stated it was "not the missing classic that one hopes it could be."

== See also ==
- List of American films of 1974
