= The Holcroft Covenant (film) =

1985 American film by John Frankenheimer

- Theatrical release poster
- Directed by: John Frankenheimer
- Screenplay by: Edward Anhalt; George Axelrod; John Hopkins
- Based on: The Holcroft Covenant by Robert Ludlum
- Produced by: Mort Abrahams; Edie Landau; Ely Landau
- Starring: Michael Caine; Anthony Andrews; Victoria Tennant; Lilli Palmer; Mario Adorf
- Cinematography: Gerry Fisher
- Music by: Stanislas
- Production company: Thorn EMI Screen Entertainment
- Distributed by: Thorn EMI Screen Entertainment
- Release date: October 18, 1985
- Running time: 112 minutes
- Countries: United Kingdom; Germany
- Budget: £8,000,000 or $13 million
- Box office: $393,825

The Holcroft Covenant is a 1985 thriller film based on the 1978 Robert Ludlum novel of the same name. The film stars Michael Caine and was directed by John Frankenheimer. The script was written by Edward Anhalt, George Axelrod, and John Hopkins.

== Plot ==
Noel Holcroft's late father — who was a general in the Wehrmacht and once close to Adolf Hitler — left behind a fortune supposedly to make amends for his wrongdoings. More than forty years later, Noel finds himself embroiled in a web of conspiracies involving the children of two of his father's Nazi colleagues, a mysterious organisation supposedly devoted to ensuring the Nazis never again come to power, and a woman who may be Noel's downfall or his only hope.

== Cast ==
- Michael Caine as Noel Holcroft
- Anthony Andrews as Johann von Tiebolt/Jonathan Tennyson
- Victoria Tennant as Helden von Tiebolt/Helden Tennyson
- Lilli Palmer as Althene Holcroft
- Mario Adorf as Erich Kessler/Jürgen Maas
- Michael Lonsdale as Manfredi
- Bernard Hepton as Leighton
- Shane Rimmer as Lieutenant Miles
- Alexander Kerst as General Heinrich Clausen
- Michael Wolf as General Erich Kessler
- Richard Münch as Oberst

== Production ==
=== Development ===
The film was part of a five picture slate from Thorn EMI in 1985, others including A Passage to India, Wild Geese II, Morons from Outer Space and Dreamchild.

Edy and Ely Landau bought the film rights to the novel along with The Chancellor Manuscript. They worked with John Frankenheimer on The Iceman Cometh and asked him to direct.

=== Writing ===
The first draft of the script was done by Edward Anhalt. However, when John Frankenheimer became attached as director, he got John Hopkins to do rewrites. The director was unhappy with these then arranged for George Axelrod to rework most of the screenplay. Frankenheimer called the film "a conspiracy movie" about "a man's search for his father". The director added, "I love Ludlum. I'm a great fan of Ludlum. I buy Ludlum's books. I mean, I pay bookstore prices for Ludlum".

"The script I worked from was relatively humorless," says Axelrod. "When John and I suggested adding much more humor, the producers said they didn't want a Walter Matthau romp. But John told them he could take the script of Some Like It Hot and turn it into a social documentary on the effects of gang warfare on the music business in Chicago during Prohibition and how that affected women's liberation - and that they needn't worry about him being too funny." Axelrod admitted he did not read the novel because he didn't have time. He later called it a "terrible picture" which he worked on because he "needed the money".

Planning was complicated when Ely Landau had a stroke so his wife had to take over the bulk of producing with Mort Abrahams. Frankenheimer said "They were no help and were in the wrong profession. It was actually the completion bond company — Gertrude Soames, the film financer, and David Korda, who worked for them — who came to our rescue."

=== Casting ===
James Caan was attached to the project when John Frankenheimer joined the film. The director recalled, "We had a long meeting, and Caan was talking about a movie that I didn't really see in the material. He said he was doing the movie because it was a love story. But a love story it's not; it's a thriller. Yes, he falls in love but it's not much of a love story. I didn't understand Caan that day and I'm sure he didn't understand me. But you tend to tell yourself that those meetings go better than they actually do, because you want the thing to succeed."

Renee Soutendijk was meant to have a role in the film, but it was removed shortly before filming and she was told she was not required for filming. "In my opinion, it was central to the story, but ... such things have happened before," she said. "It's the American way of dealing with people. In the U.S. you become aware of just being a product. You're either money to them or you're not."

Shortly after filming began, Caan walked off the set due to disagreements with the producers. Frankenheimer said that Caan was unhappy the script was not finished and did not turn up for the first day of filming. The director added, "It was a tricky situation because it wasn't clear whether Caan had just walked off the movie or had walked off the movie for cause, complaining that there hadn't been a finished script. If it went to arbitration and we lost, there'd be no money left to hire another non-English person."

Caan was replaced by Michael Caine. Director John Frankenheimer later said "I will be forever grateful to James Caan. Forever. Because he gave me the best gift that's ever happened to me in my career, which is Michael Caine."

Caine wrote in his memoirs that he accepted the job because Frankenheimer had directed one of his favourite films The Manchurian Candidate and "The book was by a great thriller writer, Robert Ludlum, so it sounded like a winner. Wrong again."

Caine made the film only a few days after finishing Water. He added, "It all happened so quickly that I didn’t even have time for a wardrobe fitting and wore my own clothes in the movie. Even more to the point, I didn’t have time to read the script properly, and only too late did I realize that I couldn’t understand the plot, so God help the poor audience who would eventually see it. However, my fee came in handy for my plans for the new house."

"As far as I'm concerned, he is probably the best actor I've ever worked with," added Frankenheimer. "Certainly the best actor I've ever worked with who gets the girl."

=== Filming ===
Filming started in West Berlin on 2 July 1984. After Caan left the film, filming resumed on 11 July. Scenes were also shot in Munich, Lindau and London. Filming took over ten weeks. Caine called the shoot "really fun... it’s amazing how much fun you can have making a bad movie — part of the charm of this business."

Frankenhimer said “Otto Plaschkes was indispensable as our line producer. The two producers were neutralized, which is the best way you can describe it because it was chaos before." He said the shoot "was a very pleasant experience. I loved London." He wound up staying in London for a year and a half after the film.

== Release ==
The film was released on October 18, 1985. Against a $13 million budget, the film made only $393,825 in the United States during its initial release.

Frankenheimer said "Ludlum thought it was really by far and away the best film made from any of his books. But difficulties over distribution rights arose." He said that EMI were not willing to invest money to publicize the film.

== Reception ==
The film has mostly negative reviews. Variety said its troubled production had resulted in a film that has "a muddled narrative deficient in thrills or plausibility". Time Out London says all Caine does is spend the film "jetting to international tourist locations so that he can be filled in on the next plot twist by an obliging minor character". The reviewer at Cinema Retro blamed "questionable" directorial decisions by John Frankenheimer, combined with "Ludlum’s lame storytelling" and "trying to turn the rambling, 528-page potboiler into a leaner 100-minute-long movie", for the film's failings.

On Rotten Tomatoes, the film holds a rating of 27% from 11 reviews.

== Home media ==
The film has been released on DVD and Blu-ray.

== Notes ==
- Caine, Michael (1993). What's it all about?.
- Champlin, Charles (1995). John Frankenheimer : a conversation with Charles Champlin. Riverwood Press.
