= Rhinoceros (film) =

1974 film by Tom O'Horgan

- VHS cover art
- Directed by: Tom O'Horgan
- Written by: Julian Barry
- Based on: Rhinocéros by Eugène Ionesco
- Produced by: Ely Landau
- Starring: Gene Wilder; Zero Mostel; Karen Black
- Cinematography: Jim Crabe
- Edited by: Bud Smith
- Music by: Galt MacDermot
- Distributed by: American Film Theatre
- Release date: January 21, 1974
- Running time: 101 minutes
- Country: United States
- Language: English

Rhinoceros is a 1974 American comedy film based on the play Rhinocéros by Eugène Ionesco. Produced by Ely Landau, it was part of the American Film Theatre series, which presented thirteen film adaptations of plays in the United States from 1973 to 1975.

== Plot ==
In a large town, residents are inexplicably transforming into rhinoceroses. Stanley (Gene Wilder), a mild-mannered office clerk, observes these bizarre transformations from a distance. However, the strange occurrences soon affect him personally, as his neighbor and best friend John (Zero Mostel) and his girlfriend Daisy (Karen Black) undergo the metamorphosis. Eventually, Stanley realizes he may be the only human left. Refusing to transform, he climbs atop his apartment building and shouts in defiance.

== Cast ==
- Zero Mostel as John
- Gene Wilder as Stanley
- Karen Black as Daisy
- Joe Silver as Norman
- Robert Weil as Carl
- Marilyn Chris as Mrs. Bingham
- Percy Rodrigues as Mr. Nicholson
- Robert Fields as Young Man
- Melody Santangello as Young Woman
- Don Calfa as Waiter
- Lou Cutell as Cashier
- Howard Morton as Doctor
- Manuel Aviles as Busboy
- Anne Ramsey as Lady with Cat
- Lorna Thayer as Restaurant Owner

== Production ==
The film adaptation of Ionesco’s play includes several changes to the original text. The setting was changed from France to a contemporary United States, incorporating a comically venerated photograph of President Richard Nixon; the lead characters Bérenger and Jean were renamed Stanley and John. A new music score by Galt MacDermot was created for the film, and a dream sequence was added to the story. Tom O'Horgan, a theater director known for staging the original Broadway production of the musical Hair, directed Rhinoceros. Zero Mostel, who starred in the 1961 Broadway production of the play, reprised his role as the man who transforms into a rhinoceros. During production, Mostel reportedly refused to smash any props during the rehearsal of his transformation scene, claiming an aversion to destroying property. Although O'Horgan considered using a live animal to depict the transformation, no rhinoceros is seen on camera; shadows, POV camera angles, and stampede rumbles suggest the animals' presence.

== Reception ==
Rhinoceros was poorly received upon its theatrical release as part of the American Film Theatre series. Jay Cocks, in his review for Time magazine, criticized the film's "upbeat, frantic vulgarization" of Ionesco's text, arguing that O’Horgan "removed not only the politics but the resonance as well, leaving only a squeaky sermon on the virtues of nonconformity." Vincent Canby of The New York Times dismissed the film as "an unreliable mouthpiece in an unreliable metaphor, so grossly overdirected by Tom O'Horgan that one might think he was making a movie for an audience of rhinoceroses instead of people."

== See also ==
- List of American films of 1974
