= Hopscotch (Garfield novel) =

1975 novel by Brian Garfield

- First edition (publ. M. Evans)
- Author: Brian Garfield
- Publisher: M. Evans
- Publication date: 1975
- Award: Edgar Award for Best Novel (1976)

Hopscotch is a 1975 novel by American writer Brian Garfield, in which a CIA field officer walks away from the Agency in order to keep from being retired and placed behind a desk, and invites the Agency to pursue him by writing an exposé and mailing chapters of it piecemeal to all the major intelligence agencies around the world, including the CIA. Hopscotch won the 1976 Edgar Award for Best Novel.

In 1980, the novel was made into a film with the same name, for which Garfield also cowrote the screenplay. The film starred Walter Matthau. Although the novel has a dark, cynical tone, the film is a comedy, but the plot follows that of the novel fairly closely.

== Historical context ==
The book came out during the period of the Church Committee Congressional investigations of the Intelligence community in the mid-1970s. The popular image of the CIA had been under attack before the committee was convened, and the Agency's image was not helped by the spate of spy novels like Hopscotch, in which the CIA was depicted as a paranoid bureaucracy out to kill any Agency insiders who dared to expose its blunders. In addition to Hopscotch, the same story was told by novels like Six Days of the Condor (1974) by James Grady (adapted for the 1975 film Three Days of the Condor), Dragons at the Gate (1975) by Robert Duncan and The Star-Spangled Contract (1976) by Jim Garrison.

The new batch of insider spy fiction that emerged 30 years after the publication of Hopscotch, has a certain resonance with the spy novels that appeared around the time of the Church Committee investigations. In Hopscotch, the Agency tries to retire Kendig—their most successful field agent—'in place', by relegating him to a desk job. Kendig decides not to take this lying down, destroys his Agency file, and walks away from the 'punishment' that his despotic bureaucrat of an office chief has ordained for him. The same scenario is repeated in The Dream Merchant of Lisbon by Gene Coyle (2004), and there are variants of this theme in Edge of Allegiance by Thomas F. Murphy (2005) and in Voices Under Berlin: The Tale of a Monterey Mary by T. H. E. Hill (2008).
