= Life of Galileo =

1943 play by Bertolt Brecht

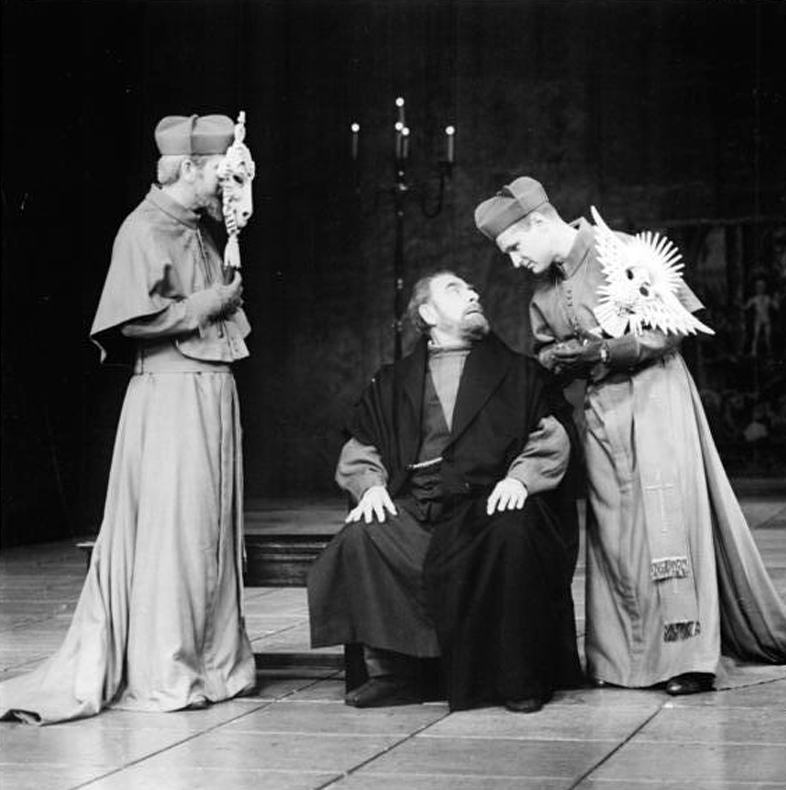
- 1971 Berliner Ensemble production
- Original language: German
- Written by: Bertolt Brecht
- Characters: Galileo; Andrea Sarti; Mrs Sarti; Ludovico Marsili; Virginia; Sagredo; Federzoni; Mr Priuli; Cosimo de Medici; Father Christopher Clavius; Cardinal Barberini; Fillipo Mucius; Mr Gaffone; Vanni; Senator; 1st Monk; Puppeteer; Rector
- Subject: Social responsibility of scientists
- Genre: Epic theatre
- Setting: Renaissance Italy

Premiere
- Date: 1943

Life of Galileo (German: Leben des Galilei), also known as Galileo, is a play by the 20th century German dramatist Bertolt Brecht and collaborator Margarete Steffin, with incidental music by Hanns Eisler. The play follows the career of the great Italian natural philosopher Galileo Galilei during the Galileo affair, in which he was prosecuted for heresy by the Roman Catholic Church for the promulgation of heliocentrism.

The play embraces themes such as the conflict between dogmatism and scientific evidence, as well as interrogating the values of constancy in the face of oppression. Further themes include the relationship between science and authority, the responsibility of a scientist to the general public, the submissiveness of scientists and common people to authority, and the subversive effect of new scientific ideas on the religious and social order.

The play was written in 1938 and received its first theatrical production (in German) at the Zurich Schauspielhaus, opening on the 9th of September 1943. This production was directed by Leonard Steckel, with set-design by Teo Otto. The cast included Steckel himself (as Galileo), Karl Paryla and Wolfgang Langhoff. The second (or "American") version was written in English between 1945–1947 in collaboration with Charles Laughton, and opened at the Coronet Theatre in Los Angeles on 30 July 1947. It was directed by Joseph Losey and Brecht, with musical direction by Serge Hovey and set-design by Robert Davison. Laughton played Galileo, with Rusty Lane as Barberini and Joan McCracken as Virginia. This production opened at the Maxine Elliott's Theatre in New York on 7 December of the same year. In 1955 Brecht prepared a third version. A production, by the Berliner Ensemble with Ernst Busch in the title role, opened in January 1957 at the Theater am Schiffbauerdamm and was directed by Erich Engel, with set-design by Caspar Neher. The play was first published in 1940.

A 1975 film adaptation starring Chaim Topol was directed by Joseph Losey, the director of the first American production of the original play.

== Versions of the play ==
After immigrating to the United States from Hitler's Germany (with stopovers in various other countries in between, among them the USSR), Brecht translated and re-worked the first version of his play in collaboration with the actor Charles Laughton. The result of their efforts was the second, "American version" of the play, entitled simply Galileo, which to this day remains the most widely staged version in the English-speaking world. This version differed in tone from the original, as Brecht felt that the optimistic portrait of the scientific project present in the first version required revision in a post-Hiroshima world, where science's harmful potential had become more apparent. This second version formed the basis for Losey's 1975 film adaptation for American Film Theatre under the title Galileo with Topol in the title role.

In September 1947, Brecht was subpoenaed in the US by the House Un-American Activities Committee for alleged communist connections. He testified before HUAC on 30 October 1947, and flew to Europe on 31 October. He chose to return to East Germany and continued to work on the play, now once again in the German language. The final German version premiered at Cologne in April 1955.

Matej Danter offers a readily-accessible and detailed comparison of the early, the American, and the final German versions.

A Scottish Theatre Company production of the Laughton translation, directed by Peter Dews, toured Scottish theatres in the autumn of 1985, with Tom Fleming in the title role.

In 2013 the Royal Shakespeare Company performed a new version of the play based on a "pared down" translation by Mark Ravenhill; the Swan Theatre production received a favorable review from the veteran theater critic Michael Billington.

== Synopsis ==
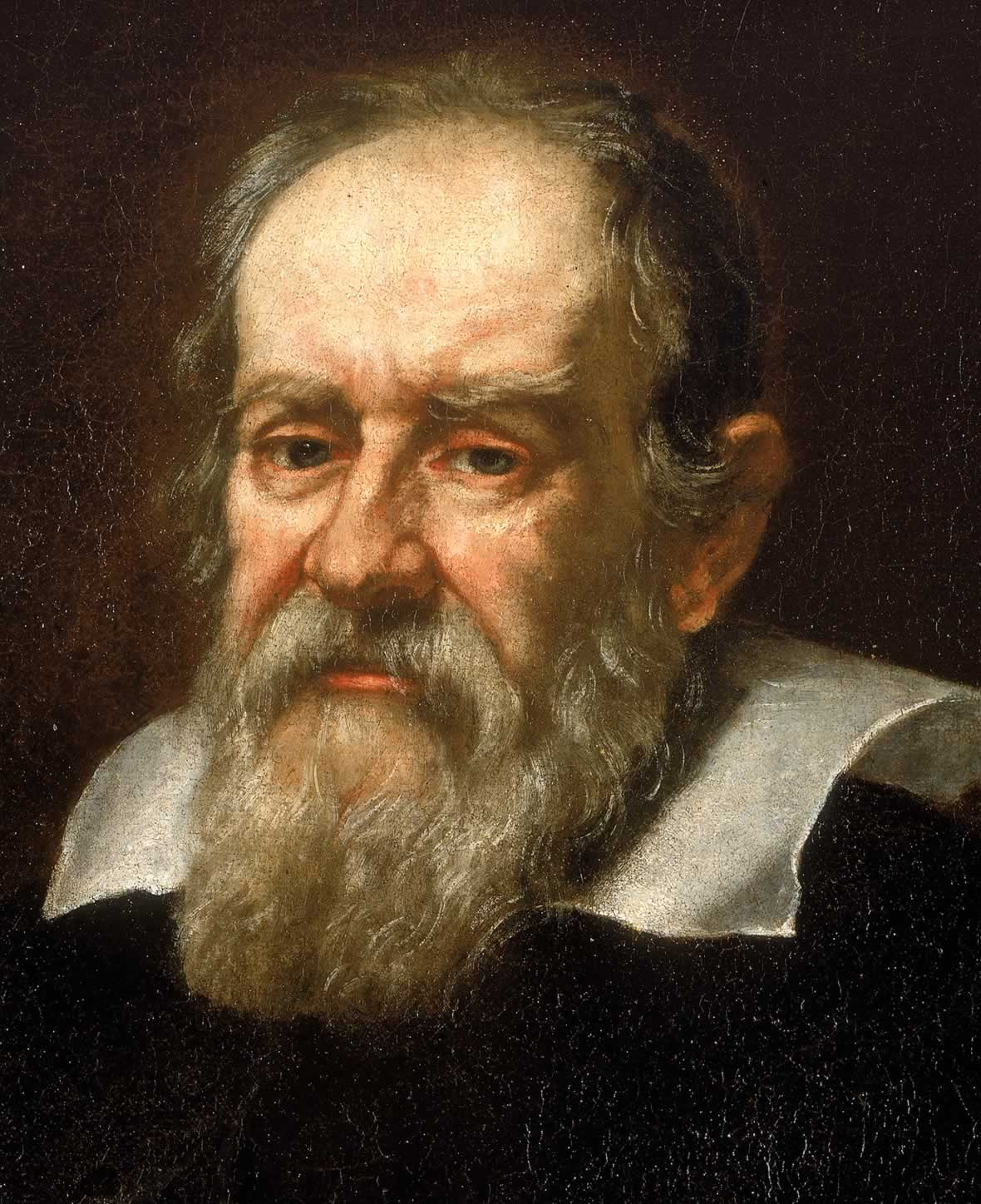
Portrait of Galileo Galilei by Giusto Sustermans, c. 1640

Galileo, an eminent professor and scientist in Padua, a city in the 17th century Venetian Republic, is short of money. A prospective student, named Ludovico Marsali, tells him about a novel invention, the telescope ("a queer tube thing"), that is being sold in Amsterdam. Afterwards, the procurator of Padua University enters and informs Galileo that he cannot approve his application for a raise unless Galileo can produce inventions with practical applications. When Galileo protests that he will be unable to pursue his theoretical research into astronomy if he focuses on business pursuits, the procurator points out that his research into astronomy would be deemed heretical in other parts of Italy and that Venice provides greater academic freedom to scientists because Venetian merchants and industrialists seek to profit from the scientific advances.

Galileo realizes that he must appease his sponsors, replicates the Dutch telescope invention, and presents it to the leaders of Venice as his own creation. Galileo's daughter, Virginia, and Ludovico congratulate Galileo on his "invention" which Galileo claims is much improved from the Dutch version and Ludovico wryly responds that Galileo's is red rather than green. After presenting the telescope, Galileo receives an increase in his salary from the University and the procurator tells Galileo that the financial incentive was necessary to elicit inventions, but within a short time, the procurator discovers Galileo's ruse and is upset to have been publicly made a fool.

Galileo then uses the telescope for careful observations of the Moon and the planets, and he discovers the moons orbiting Jupiter. He makes plans to seek the sponsorship of the Medici Court in Florence where he hopes to be able to focus more on his writing and research, but his close friend and colleague, Sagredo, pleads with him not to leave Venice since the rest of Italy is dominated by clerics. His astronomical observations strongly support Nicolaus Copernicus' heliocentric model of the Solar System, which is counter to popular belief, Aristotelian physics and the established doctrine of the Roman Catholic Church. When doubters quote scripture and Aristotle to him, Galileo pleads with them to look in his telescope and trust the observations of their eyes; they refuse.

Virginia's years long engagement to Ludovico Marsali, a wealthy young man whom she genuinely loves, is broken because of Galileo's reluctance to distance himself from his unorthodox teachings. He furthermore publishes his views in vernacular Italian, rather than traditional scientific Latin, thus making his work and conclusions more accessible to the common people, enraging the Church. Galileo is brought to the Vatican in Rome for interrogation by the Inquisition. Upon being threatened with torture, he recants his teachings. His students are shocked by his surrender in the face of pressure from the church authorities.

Galileo, old and broken, now living under house arrest with a priest monitoring his activities, is visited by one of his former pupils, Andrea. Galileo gives him a book (Two New Sciences) containing all his scientific discoveries, asking him to smuggle it out of Italy for dissemination abroad. Andrea now believes Galileo's actions were heroic and that he just recanted to fool the ecclesiastical authorities. However, Galileo insists his actions had nothing to do with heroism but were merely the result of self-interest.

== Historical background ==
The play stays generally faithful to Galileo's science and timeline thereof, but takes significant liberties with his personal life. Galileo did in fact use a telescope, observe the moons of Jupiter, advocate for the heliocentric model, observe sunspots, investigate buoyancy, and write on physics, and did visit the Vatican twice to defend his work, the second time being made to recant his views, and being confined to house arrest thereafter.

One significant liberty that is taken is the treatment of Galileo's daughter Virginia Gamba (Sister Maria Celeste), who, rather than becoming engaged, was considered unmarriageable by her father and confined to a convent from the age of thirteen (the bulk of the play), and, further, died of dysentery shortly after her father's recantation. However, Galileo was close with Virginia, and they corresponded extensively.

The play, written in 1938, also took place in the aftermath of some of the most sensational of the Moscow Trials, where many Old Bolsheviks, considered heroes of the Russian Revolution by many left-wing activists and Communist sympathisers, were suddenly accused, and then themselves confessed, to acts of sabotage, espionage, terrorism, and collaboration with Nazi Germany and other Western capitalist governments. These allegations often took forms most fantastical and outlandish, making comparisons with the Catholic Inquisition obvious. Some consider "The Life of Galileo" to be inspired by these events which had captured the world's attention for nearly 2 years.

== Allusions ==
There are a number of allusions to Galileo's science and to Marxism which are not further elaborated in the play; some of these are noted below.

The discussion of price versus value was a major point of debate in 19th century economics, under the terms exchange value versus use value. Within Marxian economics this is discussed under the labor theory of value.

More subtly, Marx is sometimes interpreted as advocating technological determinism (technological progress determines social change), which is reflected in the telescope (a technological change) being the root of the scientific progress and hence social unrest.

Questions about motivations for academic pursuits are often raised, with Galileo seeking knowledge for knowledge's sake and his supporters focused on monetizing his discoveries through star charts and industry applications. There is a tension between Galileo's pure love of science and his sponsors who only fund and protect his research because they wish to profit from it.

The mention of tides refers to Galileo's theory that the motion of the Earth caused the tides, which would give the desired physical proof of the Earth's movement, and which is discussed in his Dialogue Concerning the Two Chief World Systems, whose working title was Dialogue on the Tides. In actuality Galileo was wrong. Kepler correctly believed that the Moon's gravity caused the tides.

The bent wooden rail in scene 13 and the discussion that the quickest distance between two points need not be a straight line (though a straight line offers the shortest path, the fastest descent of a rolling ball in fact follows a curve) alludes to Galileo's investigation of the brachistochrone (in the context of the quickest descent from a point to a wall), which he incorrectly believed to be given by a quarter circle. Instead, the brachistochrone is a half cycloid, which was only proven much later with the development of calculus.

== In performance ==
- Life of Galileo at the Internet Broadway Database
