= The Sniper (1952 film) =

1952 film by Edward Dmytryk

- Theatrical release poster
- Directed by: Edward Dmytryk
- Screenplay by: Harry Brown
- Story by: Edna Anhalt; Edward Anhalt
- Produced by: Stanley Kramer
- Starring: Adolphe Menjou; Arthur Franz; Gerald Mohr; Marie Windsor; Richard Kiley
- Cinematography: Burnett Guffey
- Edited by: Aaron Stell
- Music by: George Antheil
- Production company: Stanley Kramer Productions
- Distributed by: Columbia Pictures
- Release date: May 9, 1952 (New York City)
- Running time: 88 minutes
- Country: United States
- Language: English

The Sniper is a 1952 American film noir, directed by Edward Dmytryk, written by Harry Brown and based on a story by Edna and Edward Anhalt. The film features Arthur Franz as the sniper, Adolphe Menjou, Gerald Mohr, Marie Windsor, and Richard Kiley.

The film marks Dmytryk's return to directing after he had first been named to the Hollywood blacklist and had a jail term for contempt of Congress. He chose to testify in April 1951, and named fellow members of leftist organizations from his brief time with the Communist Party. Afterward he went into political exile in England for a time. Producer Stanley Kramer was the first to hire him again as a director. The film was shot on location in San Francisco, though the city is not named in the film.

== Plot ==
Eddie Miller, a delivery man, struggles with his hatred of women. This hatred is exacerbated if he feels drawn to a woman who turns out to be unattainable; he tends to see this as a personal affront. Also, he is especially bothered when he sees women with their significant others. Miller knows he is disturbed and, out of despair, burns himself by pressing his right hand to an electric stove. The doctor treating him in an emergency room suspects he might need psychological help, but gets too busy to follow through.

Miller begins a killing spree as a sniper by shooting women from far distances with an M1A1 carbine. Trying to be caught, he writes an anonymous letter to the police begging them to stop him. As the killings continue, a psychologist has the keys (early criminal profiling techniques) to finding the killer. The film is unusual in that its ending is non-violent, despite its genre and expectations raised throughout.

== Cast ==
- Adolphe Menjou as Police Lt. Frank Kafka
- Arthur Franz as Edward "Eddie" Miller
- Gerald Mohr as Police Sgt. Joe Ferris
- Marie Windsor as Jean Darr
- Frank Faylen as Police Insp. Anderson
- Richard Kiley as Dr. James G. Kent
- Lilian Bond as Mrs. Fitzpatrick
- Mabel Paige as Landlady
- Marlo Dwyer as May Nelson
- Geraldine Carr as Checker
- Wally Cox as Laundry Worker
- Charles Lane as drunk in a bar
- Jean Willes as passerby on sidewalk
- Karen Sharpe as unnamed teenager on drugstore stool

== Production background ==
Producer Stanley Kramer was the first to hire Dmytryk as a director after his encounters with the House Un-American Activities Committee (HUAC) and testifying in 1951. For first refusing to testify, Dmytryk was named as one of the "Hollywood Ten", barred from work in the film industry and jailed for contempt of Congress. In April 1951 he changed his mind and testified, both about his brief time with the Communist Party and naming fellow members of leftist organizations. Afterward he went into a short political exile in England.

The film's comparatively comprehensive outdoor footage of 1952 San Francisco remains unsurpassed in variety for a narrative film. Many of the film's outdoor scenes were shot in the Telegraph Hill area, and at the Paper Doll Club. One scene not shot in San Francisco, although it purports to be Playland at the Beach, was actually filmed at The Pike amusement park in Long Beach.

== Reception ==
=== Critical response ===
Critic Bosley Crowther of The New York Times gave the drama a mixed review when it opened, writing:

"Therefore, The Sniper develops, as it casually gets along, into nothing more forceful or impressive than a moderately fascinating "chase." The kick-off murder of a sultry saloon singer, whom Marie Windsor plays, is ticklishly enacted, and the dragnet thrown out by the police, headed by a clean-shaved Adolphe Menjou, is interesting to observe. Frank Faylen, Gerald Mohr and Richard Kiley also contribute to the pace as assorted police factotums and the real San Francisco building and streets used for locales of the picture give it authority. But the menace and understanding of the sex fiend hopefully implied in the foreword to the picture are never clearly revealed."

Britain's Channel 4's wrote in its 2008 review,

"A little dated now, especially the nervous documentary-style camera work which soon outstays its welcome, The Sniper's thriller mechanics nevertheless work efficiently, while Franz's psycho is uncannily convincing."

=== Awards and nominations ===
Award	Category	Nominee(s)	Result	Ref.
Academy Awards	Best Motion Picture Story	Edna Anhalt and Edward Anhalt	Nominated	
