= American Film Theatre =

Former United States film production company

Poster for the American Film Theatre release of Galileo (1974–75)

From 1973 to 1975, using approximately 500 movie theaters across the US, The American Film Theatre presented two seasons of film adaptations of well-known plays. Each film was shown only four times at each theatre. By design, these were not films of stage productions — they were plays "translated to the film medium, but with complete faithfulness to the original play script." Filmgoers generally subscribed to an entire season of films, as they might if they purchased a season's tickets for a conventional stage theater. About 500,000 subscriptions were sold for the first season of eight plays using direct mail and newspaper advertising. Ely Landau was the producer for the series.

Eight films were shown in the first season. Five were shown in the second season, after which the American Film Theatre project ended. Raymond Benson summarized, "The American Film Theatre could probably never be repeated, especially within the economic structure that exists in the motion picture industry today. It’s a shame, for even though the AFT was not a perfect product, it was a bold and fascinating experiment that attempted to blend the stage with cinema. It’s the kind of project that reminds us how recklessly courageous—and often artistically brilliant—filmmakers could be in the 1970s."

The films were released on DVD in 2003 by Kino International and again in 2008 as a boxed set. They were again re-released on Blu-Ray in 2018.

== Production ==
Twelve of the thirteen films were specifically produced by Landau for the series. The budgets were low: $750,000 for each film. Landau was able to convince leading playwrights, actors, and directors to offer their work at minimal rates. The largest fee paid was $25,000; Lee Marvin remarked that he lost $225,000 by acting in The Iceman Cometh, since his usual fee for a film was $250,000.

== Marketing and distribution ==
The American Film Theatre's marketing was based on selling season subscriptions. For the 1973–74 season there were eight films exhibited. Each film was shown only four times at a specific theatre. The American Express company developed a direct mail and newspaper sales campaign that cost $2.5 million, and yielded about 500,000 subscriptions for the first season. The posters and other advertising emphasized that the films were being shown in "limited engagements", and it was rumored that the films would not be released again for years.

Most theaters that participated in the American Film Theatre showed the films on Mondays and Tuesdays, which were days on which ticket sales for the films from the major studios were relatively small. For the second season, the major studios apparently began to exert pressure on these theaters to withdraw from American Film Theatre.

== Lawsuit ==
In January 1975, the month the second season began, American Film Theatre filed an antitrust lawsuit against six of the major studios alleging that they were "coercing exhibitors into canceling scheduled AFT playdates or transferring them to theatres different from those designated to subscribers when they signed up for the AFT series". The outcome of the lawsuit isn't clear, but the second season was the last for the American Film Theatre.

== Film exhibitions ==
The months indicated for each film are for the American Film Theatre release. Excepting Three Sisters and Philadelphia, Here I Come, all of the films listed below were produced by Ely Landau and were first shown as part of the American Film Theatre.

=== 1973–74 season ===
- The Iceman Cometh (November, 1973). Eugene O'Neill's 1939 play was directed by John Frankenheimer.
- The Homecoming (November, 1973). Harold Pinter's 1964 play was directed by Peter Hall.
- A Delicate Balance (December, 1973). Edward Albee's 1966 play was directed by Tony Richardson.
- Rhinoceros (January, 1974). Eugene Ionesco's 1959 play was directed by Tom O'Horgan.
- Luther (February, 1974). John Osborne's 1961 play was directed by Guy Green.
- Three Sisters (March, 1974). US release by AFT in February, 1974. Anton Chekhov's 1900 play was directed by Laurence Olivier and John Sichel. The film was produced by John Goldstone, and had been released to theaters in the United Kingdom in 1970.
- Butley (April, 1974). Simon Gray's 1971 play was directed by Harold Pinter.
- Lost in the Stars (May, 1974). Kurt Weill-Maxwell Anderson's 1949 musical was directed by Daniel Mann.

=== 1974–75 season ===
These films were shown by American Film Theatre in the first five months of 1975.

- Galileo (January, 1975). Bertolt Brecht's play was directed by Joseph Losey, who also directed the first production of the play's English language version in 1947.
- Jacques Brel Is Alive and Well and Living in Paris (February, 1975). Eric Blau's 1968 musical was directed by Denis Héroux.
- In Celebration (March, 1975). David Storey's 1969 play was directed by Lindsay Anderson.
- The Maids (April, 1975). Jean Genet's 1947 play was directed by Christopher Miles.
- The Man in the Glass Booth (May, 1975). Robert Shaw's 1968 play was directed by Arthur Hiller. The play is based on Shaw's 1967 novel.

=== DVD release ===
- Philadelphia, Here I Come! (1970). This film adaptation of Brian Friel's 1964 play was directed by John Quested. Quested also produced the film. It was not released during the 1974–75 season, and was not specifically produced for the American Film Theatre. It had been produced in Ireland in 1971, but only premiered at the 1974 Cork Film Festival. It was included in the DVD releases of 2003 and 2008.

=== Awards ===
Despite the very limited release of the films, several performers and one writer were nominated for national film awards, with one winning.

Awards and Nominations
Artist	Film	Award	Category	Result
Kate Reid	A Delicate Balance	Golden Globe Awards	Best Supporting Actress - Motion Picture	Nominated
Robert Ryan	The Iceman Cometh	National Board of Review	Best Actor	Won
Maximilian Schell	The Man in the Glass Booth	48th Academy Awards	Best Actor	Nominated
Maximilian Schell	The Man in the Glass Booth	Golden Globe Awards	Best Actor - Motion Picture Drama	Nominated
Edward Anhalt	The Man in the Glass Booth	Writers Guild of America	Best Drama Adapted from Another Medium	Nominated

== See also ==
- American Playhouse
- Masterpiece Theatre
