= Geraldine Carr =

American film and television actress

- Born: January 10, 1914; San Francisco, California, U.S.
- Died: September 2, 1954 (aged 40); Hollywood, California, U.S.
- Occupations: Film and television actress
- Spouse: Jess Carneol

Geraldine Carr (January 10, 1914 – September 2, 1954) was an American film and television actress. She was best known for portraying Mabel in 30 episodes of the American situation comedy I Married Joan.

== Career ==
Carr began her career in the 1949 film A Kiss in the Dark. She played Mabel, the title character's best friend, in the situation comedy I Married Joan from 1953 to 1954. Carr later appeared in television programmes including three episodes of The Loretta Young Show, and in the films The Long, Long Trailer, and The Sniper.

On stage, Carr appeared in Red, Hot and Blue and Voice of the Turtle.

== Personal life and death ==
Carr was married to musician Jess Carneol.

Carr died on September 2, 1954, at the age of 40, in an automobile crash in Hollywood, California.

== Filmography ==
=== Film ===
Year	Title	Role	Notes
1949	A Kiss in the Dark	Tenant	uncredited
1950	The Great Jewel Robber	Mrs. Creel	uncredited
1951	The Company She Keeps	Rita	uncredited
1952	The Sniper	Checker	
1954	The Long, Long Trailer	Tacy's Girlfriend	uncredited

=== Television ===
Year	Title	Role	Notes
1951	Gruen Guild Theater		1 episode
1953–1954	I Married Joan	Mabel/Mrs. Gilmore	30 episodes
1952–1953	Chevron Theatre		3 episodes
1952	Mr. & Mrs. North	Edna Slawson	1 episode
1953–1954	The Pepsi-Cola Playhouse	Nella	2 episodes
1953	Hollywood Opening Night		1 episode
1953	My Hero	Marsha Pierce	1 episode
1953–1954	The Loretta Young Show	Madeline/Sheila/Mrs. Henry	3 episodes
1953	The Revlon Mirror Theater		1 episode
1953	General Electric Theater		1 episode
1958	Colgate Theatre	Aunt Sarah	1 episode
