= Luther (1974 film) =

1974 film directed by Guy Green

- DVD release cover
- Directed by: Guy Green
- Screenplay by: Edward Anhalt
- Based on: Luther; 1961 play by John Osborne
- Produced by: Ely Landau
- Starring: Stacy Keach; Julian Glover; Maurice Denham; Judi Dench; Patrick Magee; Hugh Griffith; Robert Stephens
- Cinematography: Freddie Young
- Edited by: Malcolm Cooke
- Music by: John Addison
- Distributed by: American Film Theatre
- Release dates: January 21, 1974 (US); April 1976 (UK)
- Running time: 111 minutes
- Country: United States
- Language: English

Luther is the 1974 American biographical drama film of John Osborne's biographical play, presenting the life of Martin Luther. It was one of eight in the first season of the American Film Theatre's series of plays made into films. It was produced by Ely Landau, directed by British director Guy Green, and filmed at Shepperton Studios, England. The film presents Martin Luther and his legacy for the world to evaluate. The young knight narrator (Julian Glover) is an "everyman" character who confronts Luther for advocating the suppression of the Peasants' Revolt of 1524–1526.

== Synopsis ==
The time span covered by the film is 1506–1526: from Luther's completion of his novitiate in the Augustinian monastery in Erfurt to a time just after the birth of his first son Hans (b. June 7, 1526). It is narrated by Julian Glover, who portrays a young knight in the tradition of Ulrich von Hutten and Franz von Sickingen. He takes Luther to task for failing to complete his "revolution" by supporting the peasants in their uprising: "You could have done it, Martin." Luther is confronted in the course of the film six other times, giving him the opportunity to defend himself in his own words. The metaphor of constipation and flatulence is employed to indicate Luther's progression from insecurity to confidence in life.

== Plot ==
Luther ascends his pulpit, hindered by cramps, in 1525, during the Peasants' Revolt. A wounded knight wheels in a fallen comrade, celebrates Luther's accomplishments but accuses him of abandoning his supporters. Luther denies this, and the knight wipes blood across Luther's white surplice.

The film recaps to the Augustinian monastery in Erfurt in 1506, when Luther becomes a monk. The knight explains Luther sought to protect himself from demons and excelled in the "counsels of perfection" to suppress internal doubt. Luther serves food, cleans latrines, washes dishes, shivers in bed, and paces in prayer, saying, "I am afraid of the darkness and the hole in it ... and there's no bottom to it!" Overwhelmed by his sinfulness, he leaves the stalls of chanting monks and collapses. The knight reports he dealt with doubts by "dropping them" into his bowels, i.e., becoming constipated.

Before the first Mass in which he officiates, Brother Weinand tells him his father will attend and, in vesting Luther, has him confess the Apostles' Creed, repeating "the forgiveness of sins", to tell him that "God isn't angry with you. It is you that are angry with him."

Luther imagines Jesus as a fearsome judge on a rainbow with an admonitory sword. In the Mass, he appears forgetful. Hans Luther scolds him for failing to honor father and mother when he left law for the monastery and says he believes Luther is murdering himself. Luther says a vision moved him to promise St. Anne to become a monk and felt closest to his father.

The knight comments: "So the praising ended, and the blasphemy began." Johann Tetzel preaches indulgences with pomp, claiming they would provide forgiveness even if one offered violence to the Virgin Mary. Luther meets his mentor Vicar General Johann von Staupitz who accuses him of resenting authority and making it ridiculous by meticulous observance of monastic rule. Staupitz urges him to critique the church in Latin rather than German to avoid encouraging revolt.

Luther preaches on the eve of All Saints' Day, 1517, recalling he discovered the gospel of justification by faith alone while on the latrine. He declares someone has to "bell the cat," and posts his Ninety-five Theses. Confronted by Tetzel and Thomas Cardinal Cajetan de Vio at Augsburg in 1518, Cajetan warns that, if Luther does not retract his "errors and sermons", Christian unity would fall. Luther refuses, and Cajetan concludes, "That man hates himself, and if he goes to the stake, Tetzel, you can inscribe it: 'he could only love others.'"

Luther burns the pope's bull Exsurge Domine and has a fit. Praying, he reminds God he is fighting his cause and wonders if God is dead, but concludes God cannot die but only hide.

In the Diet of Worms, Inquisitor Johann von Eck confronts Luther, interrupting his "Here I Stand" speech to warn greedy commoners would be incited to revolt if Luther does not recant. Luther refuses, and the knight exults that Luther could have led a successful revolt but disgustedly recounts Luther advocated the rebels' extermination in his Against the Murderous, Thieving Hordes of Peasants. As Luther declaims this, the emperor and princes leave to repress the revolt.

Luther wanders through a devastated marketplace of slaughtered peasants, responding: "God is the butcher. Address your abuse to him." and references the Sacrifice of Isaac by Abraham, concluding God gives life in the face of death.

Confronted by Staupitz, visiting Martin and his wife Katie, Luther admits the peasants had cause but that mobs are irreligious. Staupitz is relieved to hear Luther was unsure at Worms. Luther prays, "Help my unbelief." Luther asserts that passing air in the devil's face wards him off: going from being anal retentive to being anal expulsive shows one has overcome one's doubts and fears. Luther takes Katie's baby into his pulpit and assures him that "the dark isn't quite as thick as all that," that they should hope that Christ will be true to his word, "A little while and you'll not see me, and then again a little and you shall see me" (John 16:16).

== Cast ==
(in order of appearance)
- Peter Cellier as Prior
- Leonard Rossiter as Brother Weinand
- Stacy Keach as Martin Luther
- Patrick Magee as Luther's father
- Thomas Heathcote as Lucas, a friend of Luther's father
- Julian Glover as Knight
- Matthew Guinness as reading monk
- Hugh Griffith as John Tetzel
- Maurice Denham as Johann von Staupitz, Vicar General
- Alan Badel as Cardinal Cajetan de Vio
- Robert Stephens as Johann von Eck
- Bruce Carstairs as Duke Frederick, Elector of Saxony
- Malcolm Stoddard as Emperor Charles the Fifth
- Judi Dench as Luther's wife

== Historical inconsistencies ==
- Johann Tetzel represented as being present at Luther's meeting in 1518 with Cardinal Cajetan (de Vio) at Augsburg though he was not present.
- Johann von Staupitz is represented as alive in 1526 though he had died in 1524.

== Reception ==
Nora Sayre, writing in The New York Times, had kind words for Keach's, Magee's, Badel's, and Griffith's performances, but was troubled by changes made in the transition from stage to screen:

The Brechtian aspects of the play have been muted, and we're left with a conventional religious drama — hardly what the playwright wrought. Also, various key lines have vanished from certain scenes, only to pop up in others, and a minor character has been converted into a ponderous narrator. No doubt, clarity was intended. Cliché is the result.

== See also ==
- List of American films of 1974
