= Gerry Fisher =

English cinematographer (1926–2014)

- Born: Gerald Fisher; 23 June 1926; London, England
- Died: 2 December 2014 (aged 88); Reading, Berkshire, England
- Years active: 1947–1999
- Spouse: Jean Hawkins (m. 1951; died 2014)
- Military career
- Allegiance: United Kingdom
- Branch: Royal Navy
- Conflicts: World War II

Gerald Fisher, BSC (23 June 1926 – 2 December 2014) was an English cinematographer.

He was twice nominated for the BAFTA Award for Best Cinematography, for The Go-Between (1971) and Aces High (1976).

== Early life ==
Fisher was born in London in 1926. Early employment by Kodak and De Havilland Aircraft was followed by service in the Royal Navy during WWII.

== Career ==
Fisher then worked as a clapper boy at Alliance Riverside Studios, Twickenham, and as assistant cameraman on documentaries for Wessex Films, before becoming a Focus puller at Shepperton Studios.

After years in this capacity on films like An Inspector Calls (1954), he was promoted to camera operator on Bridge on the River Kwai (1957), before finally becoming director of photography on Joseph Losey's Accident (1967).

Fisher collaborated with Losey on a further seven films, including The Go-Between (1971).

In 1976, Fisher was nominated for the Best Cinematography award by the British Society of Cinematographers, for Aces High, and was nominated for a BAFTA Award for the same film. In 1977 he was nominated in the César Awards for Best Cinematography for Monsieur Klein.

== Later life and death ==
Fisher and his wife retired to The Film and Television Charity's Glebelands Care Home at Wokingham in Berkshire.

He died on 2 December 2014, at the Royal Berkshire Hospital in nearby Reading, at the age of 88.

== Filmography ==
=== Film ===
Year	Title	Director
1963	The V.I.P.s	Anthony Asquith
1967	Accident	Joseph Losey
1967	The Mikado	Stuart Burge
1968	Sebastian (Note: Also credited as producer)	David Greene
1968	Interlude	Kevin Billington
1968	Amsterdam Affair	Gerry O'Hara
1968	Secret Ceremony	Joseph Losey
1968	The Sea Gull	Sidney Lumet
1969	Hamlet	Tony Richardson
1970	Ned Kelly	Tony Richardson
1970	Macho Callahan	Bernard L. Kowalski
1970	All the Right Noises	Gerry O'Hara
1971	The Go-Between	Joseph Losey
1971	See No Evil	Richard Fleischer
1971	Man in the Wilderness	Richard C. Sarafian
1971	Malpertuis	Harry Kümel
1972	The Amazing Mr. Blunden	Lionel Jeffries
1973	The Offence	Sidney Lumet
1973	Bequest to the Nation	James Cellan Jones
1973	A Doll's House	Joseph Losey
1974	Butley	Harold Pinter
1974	S*P*Y*S	Irvin Kershner
1974	Juggernaut	Richard Lester
1975	Brannigan	Douglas Hickox
1975	Dogpound Shuffle	Jeffrey Bloom
1975	The Romantic Englishwoman	Joseph Losey
1975	The Adventure of Sherlock Holmes' Smarter Brother	Gene Wilder
1976	Aces High	Jack Gold
1976	Monsieur Klein	Joseph Losey
1977	The Island of Dr. Moreau	Don Taylor
1977	The Last Remake of Beau Geste	Marty Feldman
1978	Roads to the South	Joseph Losey
1978	Fedora	Billy Wilder
1979	Wise Blood	John Huston
1979	Don Giovanni	Joseph Losey
1980	The Ninth Configuration	William Peter Blatty
1981	Rends-moi la clé	Gérard Pirès
1981	Escape to Victory	John Huston
1981	Wolfen	Michael Wadleigh
1982	Un matin rouge	Jean-Jacques Aublanc
1983	Lovesick	Marshall Brickman
1983	Yellowbeard	Mel Damski
1983	Les mots pour le dire	José Pinheiro
1985	The Holcroft Covenant	John Frankenheimer
1986	Highlander	Russell Mulcahy
1987	Man on Fire	Élie Chouraqui
1987	Orn	Fred de Fooko
1988	Running on Empty	Sidney Lumet
1989	Dead Bang	John Frankenheimer
1989	Black Rainbow	Mike Hodges
1990	The Fourth War	John Frankenheimer
1990	The Exorcist III	William Peter Blatty
1991	Company Business	Nicholas Meyer
1992	Diggstown	Michael Ritchie
1994	Cops and Robbersons	Michael Ritchie
1996	When Saturday Comes	Maria Giese
1997	K	Alexandre Arcady
1999	Furia	Alexandre Aja

Short film

Year	Title	Director
1972	The Man and the Snake	Sture Rydman
1981	Le Physique et le Figuré	Serge Gainsbourg

=== Television ===
Year	Title	Director	Notes
1973	ITV Saturday Night Theatre	Jack Gold	Episode "Conflict" (aka "Catholics")
1994	Dandelion Dead	Mike Hodges	Miniseries

TV movies

Year	Title	Director
1984	Samson and Delilah	Lee Philips
1993	The Positively True Adventures of the Alleged Texas Cheerleader-Murdering Mom	Michael Ritchie

== Awards and nominations ==
Year	Award	Category	Title	Result
1971	BAFTA Awards	Best Cinematography	The Go-Between	Nominated
1976	BAFTA Awards	Best Cinematography	Aces High	Nominated
1976	British Society of Cinematographers	Best Cinematography	Aces High	Nominated
2008	British Society of Cinematographers	Lifetime Achievement Award		Won
1976	César Awards	Best Cinematography	Monsieur Klein	Nominated
