= Return of the Frontiersman =

1950 film by Richard L. Bare

- Theatrical release poster
- Directed by: Richard L. Bare
- Screenplay by: Edna Anhalt
- Story by: Edna Anhalt
- Produced by: Saul Elkins
- Starring: Gordon MacRae; Julie London; Rory Calhoun; Jack Holt; Fred Clark; Edwin Rand
- Cinematography: J. Peverell Marley
- Edited by: Frank Magee
- Music by: David Buttolph
- Production company: Warner Bros. Pictures
- Distributed by: Warner Bros. Pictures
- Release date: June 24, 1950
- Running time: 77 minutes
- Country: United States
- Language: English

Return of the Frontiersman is a 1950 American Western film directed by Richard L. Bare, written by Edna Anhalt and starring Gordon MacRae, Julie London, Rory Calhoun and Jack Holt. It was released by Warner Bros. Pictures on June 24, 1950.

== Plot ==
After Wyoming's territorial law and order is restored by men known collectively as "The Frontiersman," Sheriff Sam Barrett oversees the peaceful town of Laramie. One day, however, a gambling quarrel in the saloon turns violent. The fight involves his grown son, Logan, and a hot-tempered rancher, Kearney, who has been wounded by one of Logan's bullets. Newspaper editor Larrabee explains to the sheriff that he was accused of cheating by Kearney, who drew a gun on him. But because the editor was unarmed, Logan stepped in and shot the gun from Kearney's hand. Sheriff Barrett decides to detain both Logan and Kearney for 10 days. Kearney is livid, accusing the sheriff of bias toward his son.

Later, after both prisoners are freed, Logan rides past Kearney's ranch as gunfire breaks out. A mysterious rider shoots Kearney and heads out. Logan dismounts to lend assistance but discovers Kearney is dead. Ryan, one of Kearney's ranch hands, arrives in time to spot Logan standing over Kearney's corpse. He thus assumes it was Logan who fired the fatal shot. This is what he reports to Sheriff Barrett, who immediately forms a posse. As Barrett and his men close in on Logan, he encounters a doctor's daughter, Janie Martin, and explains his innocence. Reluctantly, she abets Logan's attempt to escape capture. Shortly, however, she fires her rifle in an attempt to signal the posse. As a result, Logan is caught and jailed a second time.

Larabee later visits the jail and sneaks a weapon into Logan's hand. Logan uses it to break out. Meanwhile, the Laramie bank is robbed and the banker shot by a man dressed like Logan who rides off on a pinto—the same breed owned by Logan. Janie subsequently spots a man in similar garb on a pinto and realizes Logan's been telling the truth about his innocence. Sheriff Barrett goes to help his son and discovers it is actually the editor Larrabee who is behind the killings and the bank robbery. In the end, Logan and his father, fighting side by side, save the day.

== Cast ==
- Gordon MacRae as Logan Barrett
- Julie London as Janie Martin
- Rory Calhoun as Larrabee
- Jack Holt as Sheriff Sam Barrett
- Fred Clark as Ryan
- Edwin Rand as Kearney
- Raymond Bond as Dr. J. A. Martin
- John Doucette as Evans
- Matt McHugh as Harvey
- Britt Wood as Barney
- Dan White as Nicol

== Production ==
The film was meant to star Alexis Smith but she refused to appear.
