= Hopscotch (film) =

1980 American comedy spy film

- Theatrical release poster
- Directed by: Ronald Neame
- Written by: Bryan Forbes; Brian Garfield
- Based on: Hopscotch by Brian Garfield
- Produced by: Edie Landau; Ely A. Landau
- Starring: Walter Matthau; Glenda Jackson; Sam Waterston; Herbert Lom; Ned Beatty
- Cinematography: Arthur Ibbetson; Brian W. Roy
- Music by: Ian Fraser
- Distributed by: AVCO Embassy Pictures
- Release date: September 26, 1980
- Running time: 104 minutes
- Country: United States
- Language: English
- Budget: $9.5 million
- Box office: $13 million or $7.5 million

Hopscotch is a 1980 American comedy spy film directed by Ronald Neame and starring Walter Matthau, Glenda Jackson, Sam Waterston, Ned Beatty and Herbert Lom. The screenplay was written by Bryan Forbes and Brian Garfield, based on Garfield's 1975 novel.

Garfield took the title of his book from the children's playground game, "wherein a player has to retrieve 'an elusive object' while hopping on a sidewalk from space to space. One false step or clumsy move could mean falling and landing on one's backside."

Matthau's performance received a Golden Globe nomination for Best Actor – Motion Picture Musical or Comedy at the 38th Golden Globe Awards. In 2002, the Criterion Collection released the film on DVD, followed by a 2K restoration on Blu-ray in 2017.

== Plot ==
At Munich's Oktoberfest, veteran CIA field agent Miles Kendig and his team foil a microfilm transfer. When Kendig returns to Washington, his boss, Myerson, reassigns him to a desk job because Kendig did not arrest Yaskov, the head of the KGB in Europe. Kendig explains to Myerson that he knows how Yaskov thinks, and it would take time and resources to identify and learn about a new replacement. Kendig's good friend and protégé Joe Cutter is nevertheless assigned to take over his mentor's old job.

Instead of accepting this situation, Kendig takes action. He shreds his personnel file and flies to Salzburg to visit his former lover Isobel von Schönenberg, whom he has not seen in a while. Yaskov, guessing what has happened, meets Kendig and invites him to defect to the KGB; when Kendig refuses, Yaskov sarcastically asks if Kendig will be retiring and writing his memoirs.

On the spot, Kendig decides to do exactly that; write and publish a memoir exposing the dirty tricks and general incompetence of Myerson's CIA. Isobel is horrified, saying that Myerson will send agents to kill him. She nevertheless helps by mailing copies of Kendig's first chapter to spy chiefs in the U.S., Soviet Union, China, France, Italy and Great Britain. Myerson assigns Cutter to stop Kendig. Yaskov, not wanting his own agency's follies exposed, also pursues his old adversary.

Kendig baits his pursuers by sending them explosive chapters and by periodically informing them of his location. Leaving Europe, he returns to the U.S., cheerfully renting Myerson's unoccupied Georgia family home, where he writes more chapters. After purposely leaking his address, Kendig convinces the FBI (which has jurisdiction) to barrage Myerson's home with both bullets and tear gas, to Myerson's great dismay.

Kendig flies to Bermuda by chartered seaplane, then to London to present his publisher with the final chapter. Yaskov informs Cutter that one of his agents has spotted Kendig in London by chance. Kendig purchases a vintage biplane—a Stampe version of the Tiger Moth—and hires an engineer to custom-modify it for a specific task. Myerson meets Kendig's publisher, who rebuffs his threatening bluster and then tells them where Kendig's hotel room is. At the vacated room, all the pursuers read copies of the final chapter he has left for them.

Kendig ambushes Cutter in his hotel room, ties him up, gags him, and informs Cutter that he will be flying across the English Channel from a small airfield near Beachy Head. Meanwhile, Isobel gives her CIA minders the slip, and crosses the Channel by hovercraft to rendezvous early the next morning with Kendig. While everyone converges on the airfield, Kendig suffers a flat tire on his way and is taken by the local police to their station. When a policeman recognizes him from a posted fugitive bulletin, Kendig escapes by short-circuiting an electrical socket and stealing a police car.

Kendig reaches the airfield, and the Americans and Yaskov arrive by helicopter soon afterward. Kendig's biplane takes off and is pursued by Myerson in the helicopter. Kendig's biplane evades Myerson's gunfire for a while, but the plane finally appears to be hit and suddenly explodes over the Channel. In fact, it was deliberately destroyed by Kendig, who has been operating it from the ground by remote control. Myerson and his CIA team assume that Kendig is finally dead; however, Cutter wryly remarks that he "better stay dead". Meanwhile, Kendig sneaks away from a deteriorating building on the edge of the airfield and disposes of the remote control that he used to fly and destroy the biplane. He and Isobel set out for a few weeks' stay in the south of France.

Months later, Kendig's explosive memoir entitled Hopscotch has become an international bestseller. Disguised as a Sikh, Kendig begins to chat in a British accent with a local bookstore clerk as he purchases a copy of his own book, much to Isobel's complete exasperation with his antics and "ridiculous disguises".

== Cast ==
- Walter Matthau as Miles Kendig
- Glenda Jackson as Isobel von Schönenberg
- Sam Waterston as Joe Cutter
- Ned Beatty as G.P. Myerson
- Herbert Lom as Mikhail Yaskov
- David Matthau as Leonard Ross
- George Baker as Parker Westlake
- Ivor Roberts as Ludlum
- Lucy Saroyan as Carla Fleming
- Severn Darden as Leroy Maddox
- George Pravda as Saint Breheret
- Jacquelyn Hyde as Rental Agent
- Mike Gwilym as Alfie Booker
- Terry Beaver as Tobin
- Ray Charleson as Clausen
- Anne Haney as Mrs. Myerson
- Douglas Dirkson as Follett
- Jeremy Young as Immigration Officer
- Joe Dorsey as Security Guard
- Allan Cuthbertson as Sir Giles Chartermain

== Production ==
=== Film score ===
The film features many pieces by Wolfgang Amadeus Mozart. Notable examples include the aria "Non più andrai" from the opera The Marriage of Figaro, the andante movement from Eine kleine Nachtmusik, the first movement of Mozart's Piano Sonata No.11, K331 (best known for the third movement, the Rondo alla turca), the Posthorn Serenade, K320 and a Rondo for piano and orchestra in D, K382.

In the Hopscotch - Criterion Collection DVD special feature "Introduction by Neame & Garfield", director Neame stated that Matthau's agent made the suggestion that they put in some Mozart because this would greatly please Matthau. As they looked into this, they realized that it would enhance the movie if Kendig loved Mozart. Ian Fraser was the arranger and found many sections of Mozart that fit the movie, but they could not find anything to go with Kendig typing. They asked Matthau; he brought in some Mozart that went perfectly with it.

Hermann Prey's singing of "Non più andrai" highlights the antics of the old biplane as Myerson is shooting at it. The song tells how the young Cherubino, going into the army, will no longer be a dainty favorite, just as 5-foot-7 Myerson is going to lose his power at the CIA. Also, the song describes bullets flying and even bombs exploding.

The aria "Largo al Factotum" from the opera The Barber of Seville by Gioachino Rossini is also featured. Matthau sings this as he passes a border checkpoint. The words to the aria explain how everyone is looking for the barber, and he moves fast like lightning.

Kendig has the aria "Un bel dì, vedremo" ("One fine day we'll see") from Madame Butterfly by Giacomo Puccini playing loudly on the stereo as the FBI and CIA shoot up Myerson's wife's house. The operatic contrapunto adds a surreal air of ironic justice to the events as Madame Butterfly sings how she will hide from her husband.

The credits also list "Once a Night" written by Jackie English and Beverly Bremers. This is the song blaring playing at the bar "The Other End", when Matthau arranges his flight from Georgia. "Once a Night" peaked at number 94 on the Billboard Hot 100 and No. 43 on the Adult Contemporary chart.

=== Casting ===
According to Neame in the DVD special feature "Introduction by Neame & Garfield", the Jewish Matthau refused to film on location in Germany, as he had lost many relatives in the Holocaust. However, he wanted to have Neame cast his son David and later his stepdaughter Lucy Saroyan, so Matthau gave in. David Matthau played Ross, the CIA agent Kendig takes prisoner after leaving Myerson's house, and Saroyan the pilot who takes Kendig to Bermuda.

According to Neame, he did not think that they could get Glenda Jackson, but she and Matthau had previously worked together in the 1978 film House Calls, and she was delighted with the prospect of working with him again.

=== Filming ===
Hopscotch was filmed in many locations in Europe and the United States, including London, United Kingdom; Marseilles, France; Bermuda; Washington, D.C.; Savannah, Georgia; Atlanta, Georgia; and Munich, in then-West Germany.

Locations in Salzburg, Austria, included The Mirabell Platz. The scenes set during Munich's Oktoberfest were filmed using eight cameras concealed in strategic locations at the Munich Fairgrounds.

=== Financing ===
IFI and the Landaus raised money from cinema chains, which later caused problems with distribution for the film. IFI wanted Goldcrest Films to invest, as they had on The Howling and Escape from New York but David Puttnam persuaded the Goldcrest board otherwise. The film earned $20 million, including $9 million in rentals. Avco-Embassy executive Jake Eberts claimed that IFI did not make money on the film.

== Differences between novel and film ==
Garfield's original script reflected the dark tone of the novel. At one point, Warren Beatty and Jane Fonda were in line for the leads.

Matthau agreed to appear with the condition that Garfield rework the script to play to his own gifts as an actor. Matthau and Neame participated in the rewrites, which continued throughout the film. The AFI catalog refers to a Hollywood Reporter article describing two of Matthau's significant contributions: the ending, in which Kendig disguises himself as a Sikh in order to visit a bookshop, and the scene in a Salzburg restaurant where Kendig and Isobel, apparently strangers, strike up a conversation about wine that reveals more and more about them and ends in a passionate kiss. The original scene relied on a great deal of exposition to bring the audience up to date. Neame said that Matthau contributed so much to the final film that he could have asked for credit, but that was never pursued.

The endings are very different. In the novel, Kendig fakes his own death using a body recovered from a Paris street and includes all copies of his manuscript, ensuring it will never be published. In the film, his escape airplane explodes in mid-air just as it heads over the English Channel and no body is recovered. His exposé is published and is a great success. Both works include a knowing nod from Cutter indicating that he is sure that Kendig is alive but hopes that he will stay dead. The character of Isobel, Kendig's old flame, provides a romantic interest in the film. In the novel, his feelings for a hired pilot prove to him that he will find a new life outside the world of spycraft.

== Reception ==
The New York Times critic Vincent Canby gave the film a rave review. "A lark, a comic cloak-and-dagger adventure ... a stylish, lighter-than-air vehicle that moves from Munich to Salzburg to Washington to the Deep South to Europe and back without once losing its breath. It is beautifully played by Mr. Matthau and Miss Jackson and by a supporting cast ... directed by Ronald Neame and scored largely by Mozart. My only reservation is that Miss Jackson isn't on the screen enough."

At the time of its release, film critic Roger Ebert of the Chicago Sun-Times described the film as "a picaresque comedy disguised as a thriller". "A shaggy-dog thriller that never really thrills us very much, but leaves a nice feeling when it's over ... partly because of the way Walter Matthau fools around with dialogue ... and partly because the movie's shot at a measured, civilized, whimsical pace. It's a strange thing to say about a thriller, but Hopscotch is ... pleasant."

TCM's Susan Doll observed: "For the most part, critical reaction to Hopscotch is dependent on the age of the reviewer", contrasting the reactions of "critics (who) understand ... its value as a vehicle for Matthau, the appeal of a literate script, and the craftsmanship behind Neame's measured style", and the responses of "contemporary reviewers, accustomed to the violence of spy dramas and the fast pace of action films, (who) tend to be critical of its fluffy plot, dry humor, and lack of action scenes".

Rotten Tomatoes gives the film a rating of 81% based on 31 reviews The consensus reads: "Boosted by a deftly underplayed performance from Walter Matthau, Hopscotch is a Cold War spy caper with comic bounce."

The film opened on 465 screens and grossed $2,552,864 in its opening weekend, debuting at number one at the US box office.

Matthau was nominated for the Golden Globe Award for Best Actor in a Motion Picture Musical or Comedy for his performance as Miles Kendig.
