= Richard Kaplan (film producer) =

American film director and producer (1925–2018)

Richard James Kaplan (January 3, 1925 – September 29, 2018) was an American documentary film and television writer, director, and producer.

== Early life ==
He was born in Manhattan to Benjamin Kaplan and Natalie (née Blaustein) Kaplan, and was raised in the Rockaways in Queens. Kaplan enrolled at Antioch College at the age of 16. He was drafted into the United States Army during World War II, interrupting his studies for three years. He graduated from Antioch after his discharge and studied filmmaking at the University of Southern California.

== Career ==
The producer worked with nonfiction film-making for around 60 years. He began making films in the 1950s, commissioned by clients such as the United States Air Force and the Indian Handicrafts Commission. Kaplan directed the 1965 biographical documentary The Eleanor Roosevelt Story, produced by Sidney Glazier, which won the Academy Award for Best Documentary Feature. He produced the 1970 Oscar-nominated documentary King: A Filmed Record... Montgomery to Memphis in collaboration with Ely Landau two years after the assassination of Martin Luther King Jr. Kaplan also worked as a college professor and media consultant.

Kaplan died on September 29, 2018, in Manhattan, aged 93.
