= Thomas Quinn Curtiss =

American historian

- Born: Thomas Quinn Curtiss; June 22, 1915; New York City, U.S.
- Died: July 17, 2000 (aged 85); Poissy, France
- Education: Browning School
- Occupations: Journalist, writer

Thomas Quinn Curtiss (June 22, 1915 – July 17, 2000) was an American writer, and film and theater critic. He is also known for his relationship with author Klaus Mann.

== Early life ==
Curtiss was born on June 22, 1915, in New York City, the son of Roy A. Curtiss and Ethel Quinn. He attended the Bovee School for Boys, a private day school on New York's Upper East Side, where he was friends with Louis Auchincloss. He graduated from the Browning School in New York in 1933. He studied film and theater in Vienna and Moscow, where he was a student of the film director Sergei Eisenstein.

Curtiss had three brothers, the eldest Roy Abijah Curtiss Jr, better known as Anthony Curtiss, was a self taught zoologist, while his other two brothers, Sidney Curtiss and Franklin Curtiss, were politicians in Massachusetts.

== Relationship with Klaus Mann ==
In Budapest during the summer of 1937, he met writer Klaus Mann, nine years his senior, a meeting Mann recorded in his diary as "In the evening, picked up the little Curtiss (cute, a little blase and arrogant kid)". Mann later wrote of Curtiss: "The luck and mystery of a first meeting. His hysteria, sadness, intelligence, gentleness, sensuality, his smile, his eyes, moans, lips, expression, voice". In his diaries, Mann refers to him as "Curtiss-darling" and "Curtiss-dear" or by a nickname he invented: "Tomski". Mann's suicidal novel Vergittertes Fenster (Barred Window), loosely based on the life and death of King Ludwig II of Bavaria and first published in the Netherlands in 1937, is dedicated to Curtiss. Their romantic relationship lasted through the end of the year, but was never untroubled as Mann fought addiction and Curtiss socialized without him. Despite the brevity of their romantic relationship, for years they saw each other or spoke at great intervals, and Curtiss remained "the great love" of Mann's life.

Curtiss was interviewed by the Federal Bureau of Investigation about Mann's sexual behavior as part of their surveillance of German émigrées during World War II.

In the 2001 Emmy-winning docudrama TV-miniseries Die Manns – Ein Jahrhundertroman, Quinn Curtis is portrayed by Torsten Liebrecht. The aged Curtiss himself is also shown in interviews.

== Enlistment ==
Curtiss enlisted in the New York 7th Regiment before World War II. He was stationed with the Supreme Headquarters Allied Expeditionary Force in Europe in 1944 and later with the US 8th Air Force, where he secured the Luftwaffe's hidden film library for the Allies. He was awarded the Legion of Honor in 1968.

== Life in Paris ==
Curtiss settled in Paris after the war. He dined so regularly at La Tour d'Argent, one of the finest restaurants in Paris, that it added a dish named for him to its menu, "oeufs à la Tom Curtiss", a variation on oeufs à la Chimay.

Curtiss became a film and theater critic for many newspapers and magazines, including the New York Herald Tribune, The New York Times, and Variety, before he joined the International Herald Tribune for which he continued to write until long after his retirement.

He also wrote several books, including a biography of Erich von Stroheim, whom he had admired in his youth. The New York Times faulted it as "handicapped by lengthy and often fictitious reported conversations", too ready to believe von Stroheim's version of events, and burdened with trivia. It said that Curtiss "has been devoted, and probably no other account will bring us so close to the proud, wounded, stubborn temper of [von Stroheim]. As a major biography, setting the director against a period, the book has serious shortcomings." He also appeared in the documentary on Stroheim's life, The Man You Loved To Hate. He wrote the script for the 1973 screen adaptation of Eugene O'Neill's The Iceman Cometh.

== Death ==
He died on July 17, 2000, in Poissy, France, at the age of 85.

== Select works ==
Author

- Von Stroheim, New York: Vintage Books, 1973, ISBN 0-394-71898-4
- The Smart Set: George Jean Nathan and H.L. Mencken, New York: Applause, 1998, ISBN 1-55783-312-5

Editor

- George Jean Nathan, The Magic Mirror. Selected Writings on the Theatre, New York: Knopf, 1960
