= Jon Landau (film producer) =

American film producer (1960–2024)

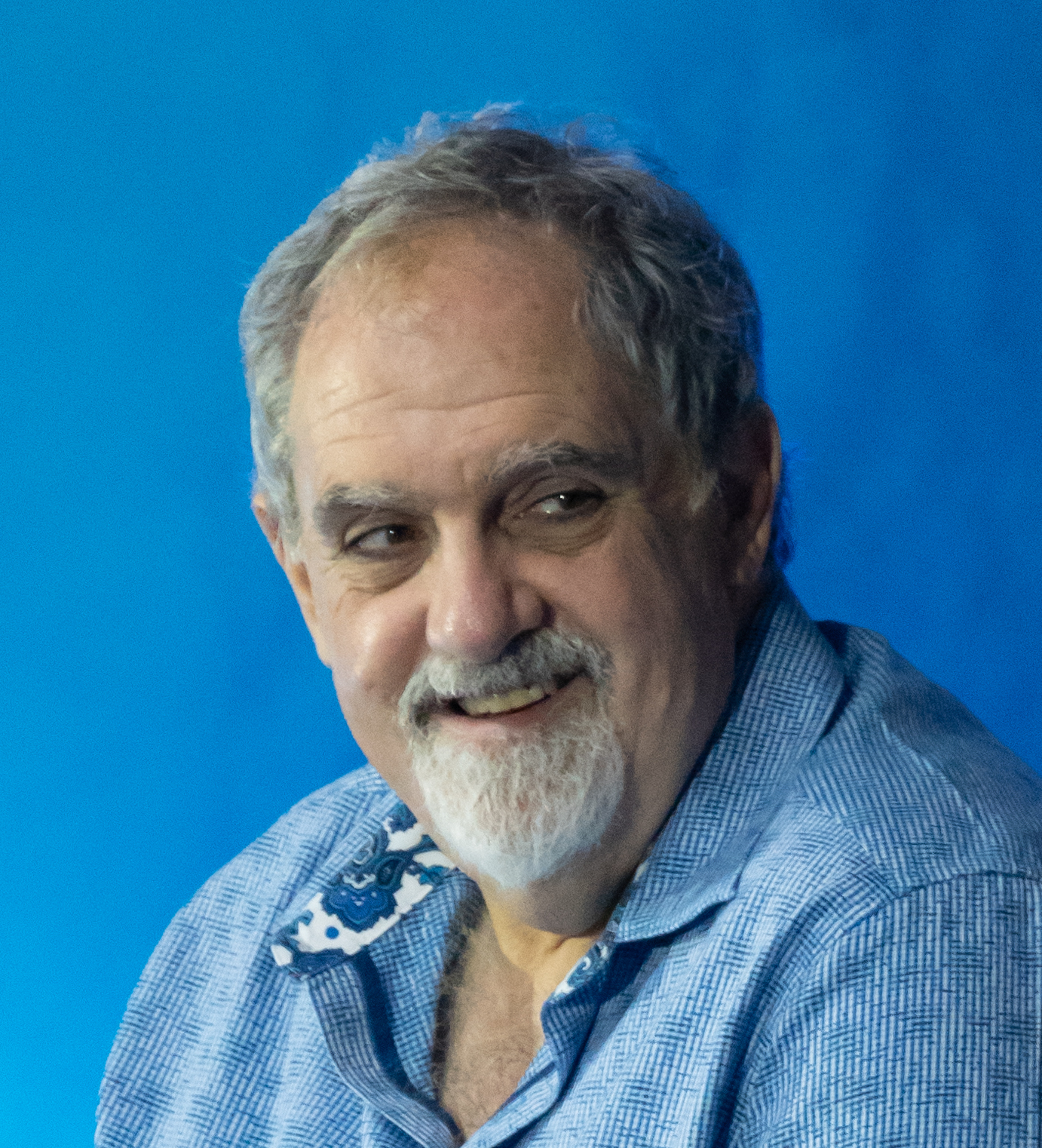
- Landau in 2022
- Born: July 23, 1960; New York City, NY, U.S.
- Died: July 5, 2024 (aged 63); Los Angeles, California, U.S.
- Resting place: Hillside Memorial Park Cemetery, Culver City, California, U.S.
- Education: University of Southern California
- Occupation: Film producer
- Years active: 1987–2024
- Spouse: Julie Lamm (m. 1987)
- Children: 2
- Parents: Ely Landau (father); Edie Landau (mother)
- Relatives: Les Landau (half-brother); Tina Landau (sister)

Jon Landau (/ˈlændaʊ/; July 23, 1960 – July 5, 2024) was an American film producer. Best known for his collaborations with filmmaker James Cameron, he co-produced Cameron's Titanic (1997)—for which he won the Academy Award for Best Picture—as well as Cameron's Avatar film series (2009–2025). Titanic, Avatar (2009) and Avatar: The Way of Water (2022) are three of the four highest-grossing films of all time, with Avatar in the top spot. (Note: Not adjusted for inflation) Landau's other notable credits include Solaris (2002) and Alita: Battle Angel (2019), both of which he produced alongside Cameron, as well as Honey, I Shrunk the Kids (1989) and Dick Tracy (1990). His final film, Avatar: Fire and Ash (2025) is dedicated to his memory.

== Early life ==
Landau was born in New York City on July 23, 1960, as the son of Edie, a producer, and Ely A. Landau, a studio executive and producer. He had two half-brothers, Neil Landau and Les Landau, and two sisters, Tina Landau and Kathy Landau. His family moved to Brentwood during his junior year of high school, where he attended Brentwood School, graduating in 1978. He later returned to Brentwood School to coach Varsity Football before embarking on his movie career. He attended the USC School of Cinematic Arts, graduating in 1983. Landau was Jewish.

== Career ==
Throughout the early 1990s, Landau was executive vice president of feature film production at Twentieth Century Fox. In 1993, he would meet James Cameron while he was, as Cameron put it, "serving as the studio 'suit' assigned to oversee True Lies." According to Cameron, he "lured" Landau "away from Fox to join Cameron's production company, Lightstorm."

He was best known for producing Titanic (1997), a film which won him an Academy Award and became the highest-grossing film of all time, the first ever to reach $1 billion in gross revenues. The film reached $1.84 billion, more than double the $914 million of then-record-holder Jurassic Park (1993). Titanic later went on to gross another $300 million in 2012, pushing the film's worldwide total to $2.18 billion, becoming the second film to ever hit $2 billion, as a result. In addition to producing Titanic, Landau also was responsible for building Baja Studios where the movie was filmed, in a record five months.

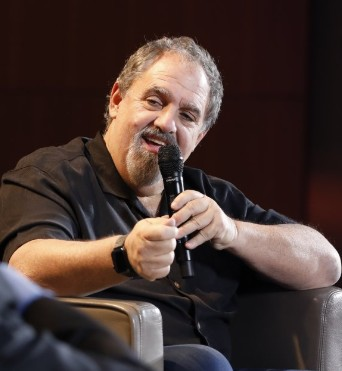
Landau in 2019

In 2009, Landau and Cameron produced the science fiction film Avatar, which has since surpassed their earlier collaboration, Titanic, to become the highest-grossing film of all time. Avatar earned Landau his second Academy Award nomination. Shortly after his death in July 2024, Cameron stated that it was Landau who was in fact "the heart of the Avatar family” and "the center of gravity of our bubble universe."

== Personal life and death ==
Landau was married to Julie Lamm in 1987. They had two sons, Jamie and Jodie.

Landau died in Los Angeles on July 5, 2024, at the age of 63, after a 16-month battle with esophageal cancer. He had been diagnosed over a year prior to his death and chose to write a memoir as a result.

== Accolades ==
- Florida Film Critics Circle Award Winner – Titanic – (1997)
- Golden Globe Award Winner – Titanic – (1998)
- Producers Guild of America Darryl F Zanuck Theatrical Motion Picture Producer of the Year Award Winner – Titanic – (1998)
- Academy Award Winner – Titanic – (1998)
- Nickelodeon Kid's Choice Award Winner – Titanic – (1998)
- MTV Movie Award Winner – Titanic – 1997
- People Choice Award Winner – Titanic – (1999)
- Golden Globe Award Winner – Avatar – (2010)
- Producers Guild of America Darryl F Zanuck Theatrical Motion Picture Producer of the Year Award Nomination – Avatar – (2010)
- Academy Award Nomination – Avatar – (2010)
- Golden Globe Award Nomination – Avatar: The Way of Water – (2023)
- Producers Guild of America Darryl F Zanuck Theatrical Motion Picture Producer of the Year Award Nomination – Avatar: The Way of Water – (2023)
- Academy Award Nomination – Avatar: The Way of Water – (2023)

== Filmography ==
Year	Film	Director	Notes
1987	Campus Man	Ron Casden	Co-produced with Peggy Fowler
1989	Honey, I Shrunk the Kids	Joe Johnston	Also co-producer
1990	Dick Tracy	Warren Beatty	Also co-producer
1997	Titanic	James Cameron	Co-produced with James Cameron
2002	Solaris	Steven Soderbergh	Co-produced with James Cameron & Rae Sanchini
2009	Avatar	James Cameron	Co-produced with James Cameron
2019	Alita: Battle Angel	Robert Rodriguez	Co-produced with James Cameron
2022	Avatar: The Way of Water	James Cameron	Co-produced with James Cameron
2025	Avatar: Fire and Ash	James Cameron	Posthumous release; Co-produced with James Cameron; Dedicated to his memory
