= Edna Anhalt =

American screenwriter

- Born: Edna Thompson; April 10, 1914; New York City, New York, USA
- Died: 1987 (aged 72–73)
- Occupation: Screenwriter
- Spouse: Edward Anhalt (div.)

Edna Anhalt (born Edna Thompson) was an American screenwriter, television writer, and film producer.

== Biography ==
Together with then-husband Edward Anhalt, she enjoyed some considerable success in a 10-year stretch from 1947 to her retirement in 1957. This stretch was capped with an Academy Award for Best Story win for Elia Kazan's 1950 film Panic in the Streets, and another nomination two years later for The Sniper. She also wrote the screenplays to The Member of the Wedding (1952), Not as a Stranger (1955) and The Pride and the Passion (1957), which was her last film credit.

Following her divorce from Edward, she later moved into television script-writing and wrote episodes for anthologies The Schlitz Playhouse (1957), General Electric Theatre (1958), and The Virginian (1965).

== Filmography ==
Year	Film	Role
1947	Bulldog Drummond Strikes Back	Script
1948	The Younger Brothers	Script
1948	Embraceable You	Script
1950	Panic in the Streets	From a Story By
1950	Sierra	Screenplay
1950	Return of the Frontiersman	Screenplay
1952	My Six Convicts	Associate Producer
1952	Eight Iron Men	Associate Producer
1952	The Sniper	Associate Producer. Original Story
1953	The Member of the Wedding	Associate Producer, Script
1955	Not as a Stranger	Script
1957	The Hole Card	Teleplay
1957	The Pride and the Passion	Screen Story and Screenplay by
