= In Celebration (play) =

1969 play by David Storey

- First edition (Jonathan Cape, 1969)
- Written by: David Storey
- Setting: The Derbyshire mining town of Langwith

Premiere
- Date premiered: 22 April 1969
- Place premiered: Royal Court Theatre, London

In Celebration is a 1969 play by the English writer David Storey. It is set in a Nottinghamshire mining town and tells the story of three brothers who visit their parents for their 40th wedding anniversary.

According to Storey, the three brothers are based on aspects of himself: "One was a very passive nature, the second was a kind of conformist nature, and the third was a kind of bolshie nature that didn't want to have anything to do with the other two." The play took three days to write. It premiered in April 1969 at the Royal Court Theatre, where it was directed by Lindsay Anderson and ran for twelve weeks. Anderson also directed a 1975 film adaptation with the same title and the same cast (with the exclusion of the Reardon character).

== Original cast ==
- Andrew Shaw – Alan Bates
- Mr Shaw – Bill Owen
- Mrs Shaw – Constance Chapman
- Colin Shaw – James Bolam
- Steven Shaw – Brian Cox
- Mrs Burnett – Gabrielle Daye
- Reardon – Fulton Mackay
