= Glass slipper =

Glass slipper may refer to:

- "Cinderella", the traditional fairy tale also known as "The Little Glass Slipper"
- The Glass Slipper (film), a 1955 musical film starring Leslie Caron
- The Glass Slipper (novel), a 1938 mystery novel
- Glass Slipper (dragster), a 1957 drag racing automobile
- Glass Slipper Project, a US charitable prom organization
- Glass Slippers, a 2002 South Korean TV drama series
- Glass Slippers (horse), a racehorse foaled in 2016
