= King: A Filmed Record... Montgomery to Memphis =

1970 American documentary

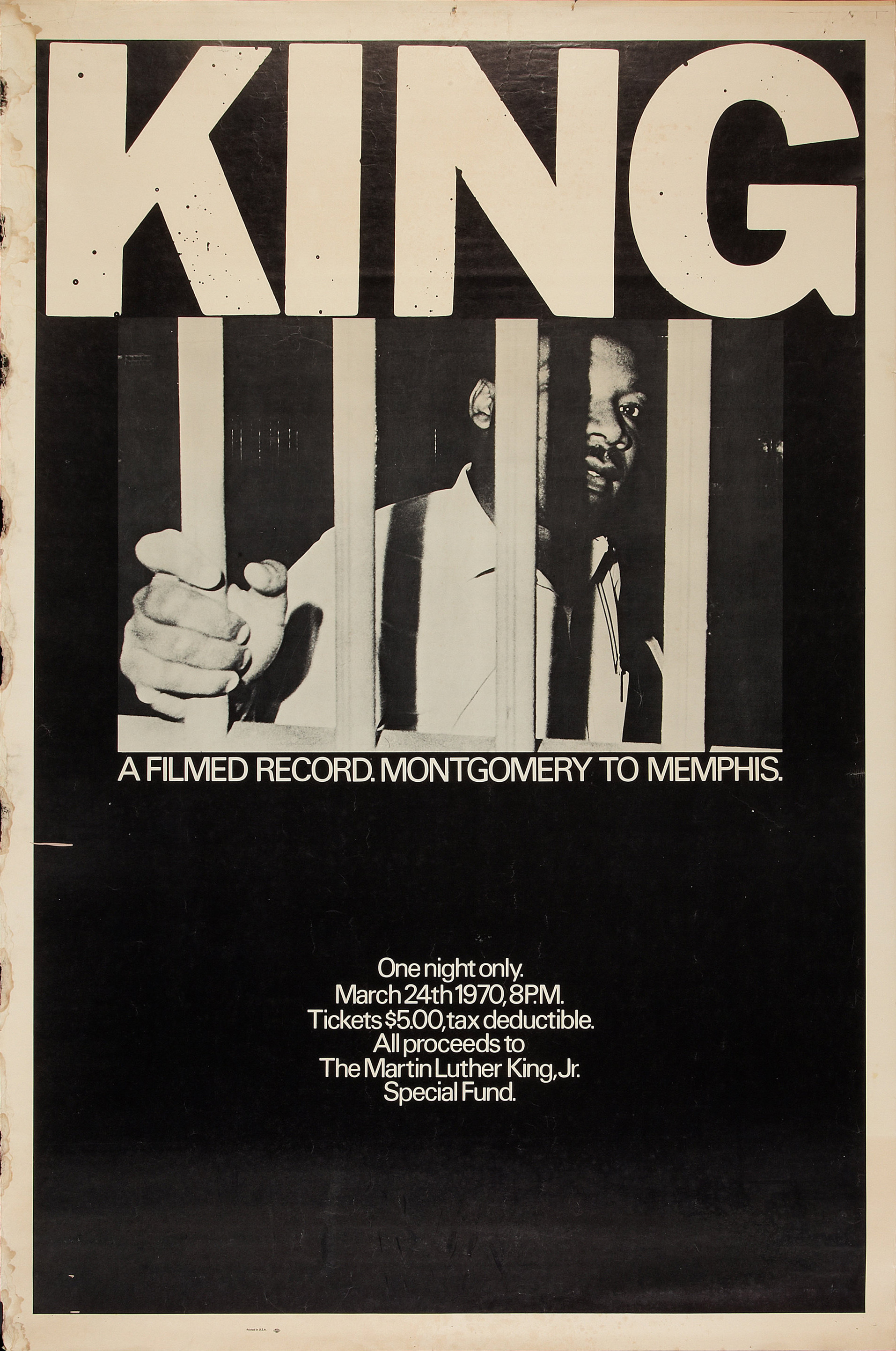
- Theatrical release poster
- Directed by: Sidney Lumet; Joseph L. Mankiewicz
- Produced by: Ely Landau
- Narrated by: Harry Belafonte; Ruby Dee; Ben Gazzara; Charlton Heston; James Earl Jones; Burt Lancaster; Paul Newman; Anthony Quinn; Clarence Williams III; Joanne Woodward
- Edited by: Lora Hayes; John N. Carter
- Music by: Coleridge-Taylor Perkinson
- Color process: Black and white
- Production company: Commonwealth United Entertainment
- Distributed by: Martin Luther King Film Project
- Release date: March 24, 1970
- Running time: 185 minutes
- Country: United States
- Language: English

King: A Filmed Record... Montgomery to Memphis is a 1970 American documentary film biography of Martin Luther King Jr. Directed by Sidney Lumet and Joseph L. Mankiewicz, the film chronicles King's creation and leadership of the nonviolent campaign for civil rights and social and economic justice in the Civil Rights Movement.

== Summary ==
It uses only original newsreel and other primary material, unvarnished and unretouched, and covers the period from the Montgomery bus boycott of 1955 and 1956 through his assassination in 1968. The original newsreel segments are framed by celebrity narrators Harry Belafonte, Ruby Dee, Ben Gazzara, Charlton Heston, James Earl Jones, Burt Lancaster, Paul Newman, Anthony Quinn, Clarence Williams III, and Joanne Woodward. The movie was produced by Ely Landau and directed by Sidney Lumet (the only documentary he directed) and Joseph L. Mankiewicz. Richard J. Kaplan was the associate producer in charge of production.

== Released ==
When first released, it was shown in over 500 theaters as a "one-time-only" event on March 24, 1970, for one night only. After the screening, the prints of the film were to be given to the Martin Luther King Jr. Special Fund for distribution in schools and for civic groups. Tickets were priced at $5 and the event was estimated to have generated $2 million which went to the Fund.

== Reception and legacy ==
The film has received 100% on Rotten Tomatoes.

It was nominated for the Academy Award for Best Documentary Feature. In 1999, this film was deemed "culturally, historically, or aesthetically significant" by the United States Library of Congress and selected for preservation in its National Film Registry.

=== Rediscovery ===
After its "one-time-only" showing it was occasionally seen on commercial television (unedited and with limited interruption) and for a short period released for home video on the Pacific Arts label and distributed to the educational market by Richard Kaplan Productions. Then for many years it was no longer available and rarely seen. Finally, in 2010 Richard Kaplan, who had long felt that King should be seen by a new generation who knew of it only by reputation, set up a not-for-profit company, A Filmed Record Inc., and produced a DVD using master elements he had stored over the years. A Filmed Record, Inc. released the DVD and King was once again available after 40 years of being a "lost" film.

In 2012 A Filmed Record, Inc. (with the cooperation of the estate of Ely Landau producer of the original film) entered into an agreement with Kino Lorber giving them worldwide exclusive rights to distribute King and to make possible its being seen by the largest possible audience. Kino Lorber, Inc., in partnership with The Library of Congress and with the cooperation of the Museum of Modern Art, restored and remastered the original enabling 35 mm prints and made the film available on DVD and Blu-ray.

Kino Lorber and Kaplan prepared a nationwide commemoration of the 50th Anniversary of the March on Washington and King's "I Have a Dream" speech, which was screened at the Brooklyn Academy of Music's BAMcinématek on August 13, 2013, followed by a screening at Film Forum on August 28, 2013. Kino Lorber was also launching an educational outreach campaign to provide a 24-minute abridged version of the film, titled Legacy of a Dream, to every high school in America.

== See also ==
- Civil rights movement in popular culture
- List of American films of 1970
- Malcolm X, 1972 documentary also nominated for Best Documentary Feature Oscar
