= A Delicate Balance (film) =

1973 film directed by Tony Richardson

- Theatrical release poster
- Directed by: Tony Richardson
- Written by: Edward Albee
- Produced by: Ely Landau
- Starring: Katharine Hepburn; Paul Scofield; Lee Remick; Kate Reid; Joseph Cotten; Betsy Blair
- Cinematography: David Watkin
- Edited by: John Victor Smith
- Distributed by: American Film Theatre
- Release date: November 12, 1973
- Running time: 133 minutes
- Countries: United States; Canada; United Kingdom
- Language: English

A Delicate Balance is a 1973 American-Canadian-British drama film directed by Tony Richardson and starring Katharine Hepburn, Paul Scofield, Lee Remick, Kate Reid, Joseph Cotten, and Betsy Blair. The screenplay by Edward Albee is based on his 1966 Pulitzer Prize–winning play of the same name.

The film was the second in a series produced by Ely Landau for his American Film Theatre, a subscription-based program of screen adaptations of notable stage plays shown in five hundred theaters in four hundred cities.

== Plot ==
The film spans three days in the life of Agnes and Tobias, an upper middle class couple who share their comfortable suburban Connecticut home with Agnes' acerbic alcoholic sister Claire. It is matriarch Agnes who helps the trio maintain a delicate balance in their lives, held together by habit, shared memories, and considerable consumption of dry martinis.

The seemingly peaceful facade of their existence is shattered with the arrival of longtime friends Harry and Edna who, suddenly overcome by a nameless terror, fled their home in search of a safe haven. The couple is followed by Agnes and Tobias' bitter, 36-year-old daughter Julia, who has returned to the family nest following the collapse of her fourth marriage. Their presence leads to a period of self-examination, during which all six are forced to explore their psyches and confront the demons hidden there.

== Cast ==
- Katharine Hepburn as Agnes
- Paul Scofield as Tobias
- Lee Remick as Julia
- Kate Reid as Claire
- Joseph Cotten as Harry
- Betsy Blair as Edna

== Critical reception ==
Roger Ebert called the film "a fine, tough, lacerating production", and added, "Richardson's cast could hardly be better".

TV Guide rated the film two out of four stars, calling it "unfortunately stiff, dull, and extremely stagy".

== Awards and nominations ==
Kate Reid was nominated for the Golden Globe Award for Best Supporting Actress – Motion Picture.

== See also ==
- List of American films of 1973
