= Constance Chapman =

British actress

- Chapman in In Celebration (1975) with Bill Owen
- Born: 29 March 1912; Weston-super-Mare, England
- Died: 10 August 2003 (aged 91); Bristol, England
- Occupation: Actor
- Spouse: Travers Cousins
- Children: 2

Constance Chapman (29 March 1912 – 10 August 2003) was an English character actor working in theatre and television. She also made occasional film appearances.

She made her stage debut in 1938 in Hay Fever at the Knightstone Theatre, Weston-super-Mare. Repertory work followed until her London debut in 1969 at the Royal Court Theatre for director Lindsay Anderson. In Celebration proved to be her big break, and opened the floodgates for further acting work.

Her roles include Mrs. Brown in the 1982 Granada Television adaptation of A Kind of Loving and Anne in the Children's science fiction series, The Georgian House (1976). Her many comedy roles included appearances in the John Cleese film Clockwise (1986), Victoria Wood As Seen On TV, and playing Uncle Albert's girlfriend, Elsie Partridge, in an episode of Only Fools and Horses. She repeated her leading role in the Lindsay Anderson film of In Celebration (1975), having previously appeared in Anderson's film O Lucky Man! (1973), and her other film credits included The Raging Moon (1971), Doomwatch (1972), Hedda (1975), The Three Hostages (1977) and Lady Oscar (1979).

== Partial filmography ==
- Say Hello to Yesterday (1971) – Boy's mother (uncredited)
- The Raging Moon (1971) – Mrs. Mathews
- Doomwatch (1972) – Miss Johnson
- A Day in the Death of Joe Egg (1972) – Moonrocket Lady
- O Lucky Man! (1973) – Lady Burgess
- In Celebration (1975) – Mrs. Shaw
- Hedda (1975) – Juliane Tesman (Aunt Julie)
- The Three Hostages (1977) – Madame Breda
- Lady Oscar (1979) – La nourrice
- Clockwise (1986) – Mrs. Wheel
- The Bill (1989) Series 5 Episode 75, "Exit Lines" – Agnes Prendergast
- Only Fools and Horses (1989) Series 6 Episode 5, "Sickness and Wealth" – Elsie Partridge
