= The Eleanor Roosevelt Story =

- Directed by: Richard Kaplan
- Written by: Archibald Macleish
- Produced by: Sidney Glazier
- Narrated by: Eric Sevareid; Archibald Macleish; Corinne Alsop Cole (as Mrs. Francis Cole)
- Edited by: Miriam Arsham
- Production company: Sidney Glazier Productions
- Distributed by: Allied Artists
- Release date: November 8, 1965
- Running time: 90 minutes
- Country: United States
- Language: English

The Eleanor Roosevelt Story is a 1965 American biographical documentary film directed by Richard Kaplan.

== Reception and legacy ==
Stanley Kauffmann of The New Republic described The Eleanor Roosevelt Story as 'an outstandingly tasteful and skilled piece of documentary film-making, particularly deft in its use of still photos, where necessary'. Bosley Crowther of The New York Times said the film conveyed a great deal of humanity and devotion and claimed it to be one of the most moving and encouraging films.

=== Accolades ===
It won the Academy Award for Best Documentary Feature at the 38th Academy Awards in 1966.

The Academy Film Archive preserved The Eleanor Roosevelt Story in 2006.

== See also ==
- List of American films of 1965
