= The Iceman Cometh (1973 film) =

1973 film by John Frankenheimer

- Theatrical release poster
- Directed by: John Frankenheimer
- Screenplay by: Eugene O'Neill; Thomas Quinn Curtiss (Note: Credited as 'Text editor'.)
- Based on: The Iceman Cometh (1946 play) by Eugene O'Neill
- Produced by: Ely Landau
- Starring: Lee Marvin; Fredric March; Robert Ryan; Jeff Bridges; Bradford Dillman
- Cinematography: Ralph Woolsey
- Edited by: Harold F. Kress
- Production company: Ely Landau Organization; American Express Films; Cinevision
- Distributed by: American Film Theatre
- Release date: October 29, 1973
- Running time: 178 minutes (theatrical); 239 minutes (director's cut)
- Country: United States
- Language: English
- Budget: $800,000

The Iceman Cometh is a 1973 American drama film directed by John Frankenheimer, based on the 1946 play by Eugene O'Neill. The film was produced by Ely Landau for the American Film Theatre, which from 1973 to 1975 presented 13 film adaptations of noted plays. The principal cast stars Lee Marvin, Fredric March, Robert Ryan, Jeff Bridges, and Bradford Dillman, with supporting roles played by Sorrell Booke, Martyn Green, Moses Gunn, Clifton James, Tom Pedi, and George Voskovec.

The film was screened at the 1976 Cannes Film Festival, but it wasn't entered into the main competition. It received positive reviews from critics, who praised both the performances and the film's faithfulness to its source material. Frankenheimer considered it his best work as a director.

This was the last film for both Ryan and March. March developed prostate cancer in 1970, causing him to retire from acting. Ryan died before the film's release. Ryan posthumously won the National Board of Review Award for Best Actor for his performance.

== Plot ==
The film follows a group of regulars at Harry Hope's bar and boarding house. All are satisfied with their present drunken state. Each are anticipating the arrival of a salesman named Hickey who has subsidized their pipe dreams, and each year celebrated owner Harry Hope's birthday. But when Hickey arrives, he proclaims their dreams the enemy and begins to preach a better, sober life in the name of friendship. At first the regulars reject their delusions, but in the end reject Hickey, who eventually admits he murdered his wife. After Hickey is taken away by the authorities, the regulars label him insane rather than deal with their own weaknesses and return to their previous lives.

== Cast ==
- Lee Marvin as Theodore "Hickey" Hickman
- Fredric March as Harry Hope
- Robert Ryan as Larry Slade
- Jeff Bridges as Don Parritt
- Bradford Dillman as Willie Oban
- Sorrell Booke as Hugo Kalmar
- Hildy Brooks as Margie
- Nancy Juno Dawson as Pearl
- Evans Evans as Cora
- Martyn Green as Cecil Lewis
- Moses Gunn as Joe Mott
- Clifton James as Pat McGloin
- John McLiam as Jimmy Tomorrow
- Stephen Pearlman as Chuck Morelo
- Tom Pedi as Rocky Pioggi
- George Voskovec as Piet Wetjoen
- Don McGovern as Moran
- Bart Burns as Lieb

=== Casting notes ===
Several of the cast had previous experience with O'Neill. Tom Pedi (Rocky) originated the role 1946 New York stage production and reprised it in the 1960 television version. Sorrell Booke (Hugo) played the same role in the 1960 version.

Bradford Dillman and Robert Ryan had both starred in productions of Long Day's Journey into Night, Dillman in the 1956 Broadway premiere and Ryan in a 1971 Off-Broadway revival.

== Production ==
=== Development ===
Ely Landau had begun developing adaptation of Eugene O'Neill's play had been in development since the early 1960s. After the success of 1962's Long Day's Journey into Night, directed by Sidney Lumet, Landau announced a film directed by Lumet and starring Rod Steiger. However, both dropped out before production began.

John Frankenheimer came aboard in 1972. Much like Lumet, Frankenheimer called upon his experience directing live television broadcasts when conducting rehearsals, and shot the entire film in-sequence.

=== Writing ===
Rather than write a new screenplay for the film, Frankenheimer intended to do a direct adaptation of the stage text, without major revisions or alterations. O'Neill historian and theatre critic Thomas Quinn Curtiss was hired as a "text editor" (rather than a screenwriter), with Edward Anhalt as a "story consultant." Nonetheless, in order to fit the typically four-hour-play into a cinematic runtime, dialogue was trimmed for time, and the character of Ed Mosher was excised entirely, with his lines given to other characters.

According to Frankenheimer, he and Curtiss initially trimmed 75 minutes from the text, but these were re-incorporated into the script during rehearsals.

=== Casting ===
Both Marlon Brando and Gene Hackman were approached to play Hickey.

Fredric March came out of retirement to play Harry Hope. He initially declined, since the shooting schedule overlapped with prostate surgery, but Frankenheimer convinced the producers to delay filming by several months until after March recovered.

Ryan was terminally ill with lung cancer while shooting, this would prove his final film role, as well as March's

=== Filming ===
Filming took place at the 20th Century Fox studio lot in Century City.

Frankenheimer later said:

It was a marvelous movie – up til now (1974) my best experience. We were like a repertory company; we never wanted it to end. I tried to show Hickey as sane and not the way I've seen him interpreted, as insane. I think you have to live your life without illusions, not with them. Pauline Kael said in her review that you only have to look at photos of O'Neill to see this was a face with no illusions.

=== Editing ===
The final theatrical runtime ended up being 2 hours and 58 minutes. The director's cut of the film, running 3 hours and 59 minutes, has two intermissions. Frankenheimer said:

We found the most difficult thing was to cut it. We cut 1 hour and 20 minutes out of the original, but by the time we'd finished it we'd put back in an hour.

== Release ==
=== Home media ===
Both the 178 minute theatrical cut and the 239 minute director's cut were released on Blu-ray in 2019 by Kino Lorber as a 2K restoration. However, the director's cut reportedly had to be cobbled together from another print, as the extra scenes are of much worse quality than the theatrical footage.

== Reception ==
=== Critical response ===
Roger Ebert gave the film his highest possible grade of four stars and wrote: "The play was clearly too difficult to be done as an ordinary commercial movie, but now it has been preserved, with a series of brilliant performances and a virtuoso directing achievement, in what has to be a definitive film version." Ebert ranked The Iceman Cometh fifth on his year-end list of the best films of 1973.

Vincent Canby of The New York Times wrote in a less enthusiastic review that while watching the film "you get the feeling that you're being taken on a guided tour of one of the greatest American plays ever written, instead of seeing a screen adaptation with a life of its own."

Variety declared: "The excellence of the cast alone, and the fame of the work and its author make this filmed stage play worth the ticket ... It requires stamina, of course, to sit through four hours, but the experience is very special."

Gene Siskel of the Chicago Tribune awarded three-and-a-half stars out of four and stated: "The pleasures of this great play are so many and so strong that this frequently ordinary rendering of it on film leaves its power virtually undiminished."

Charles Champlin of the Los Angeles Times wrote: "'No play is too long that holds the interest of its audience,' Eugene O'Neill once told an interviewer ... Even with editing, John Frankenheimer's filmed version of the play runs four hours plus two intermissions. But O'Neill was right and the film, like the play, holds its commanding grip on the viewer over the whole distance."

Pauline Kael of The New Yorker wrote that the play "has been given a straightforward, faithful production in handsome dark-toned color" that "Frankenheimer directed fluently and unobtrusively, without destroying the conventions of the play."

The film holds a score of 91% on Rotten Tomatoes based on nine reviews.

=== Awards and nominations ===
Institution	Year	Category	Nominee	Result
Kansas City Film Critics Circle	1973	Best Supporting Actor	Robert Ryan	Won (posthumously)
National Board of Review	1973	Best Actor	Robert Ryan	Won (Note: Tied with Al Pacino for Serpico.) (posthumously)
National Society of Film Critics	1974	Best Actor	Robert Ryan	2nd place (posthumously)
National Society of Film Critics	1974	Special Award	Robert Ryan	Won (posthumously)

== See also ==
- List of American films of 1973

== Bibliography ==
- "The Iceman Cometh". American Film Institute (AFI). 2003. Extensive unsigned notes discuss the long history of this production.
