= The Madwoman of Chaillot (film) =

1969 film by Bryan Forbes, John Huston

- Film poster
- Directed by: Bryan Forbes
- Written by: Edward Anhalt
- Based on: La Folle de Chaillot; 1945 play by Jean Giraudoux, in 1947 adapted by Maurice Valency
- Produced by: Ely Landau; Anthony B. Unger
- Starring: Katharine Hepburn; Charles Boyer; Claude Dauphin; Edith Evans; John Gavin; Paul Henreid; Oskar Homolka; Margaret Leighton; Giulietta Masina; Nanette Newman; Richard Chamberlain; Yul Brynner; Donald Pleasence; Danny Kaye
- Cinematography: Burnett Guffey; Claude Renoir
- Edited by: Roger Dwyre
- Music by: Michael J. Lewis
- Production company: Commonwealth United Entertainment
- Distributed by: Warner Bros.-Seven Arts
- Release date: October 12, 1969
- Running time: 132 minutes
- Country: United States
- Language: English

The Madwoman of Chaillot is a 1969 American satirical film made by Commonwealth United Entertainment and distributed by Warner Bros.-Seven Arts. It was directed by Bryan Forbes and produced by Ely A. Landau with Anthony B. Unger as associate producer. The screenplay was by Edward Anhalt, based on The Madwoman of Chaillot, Maurice Valency's adaption of La Folle de Chaillot by Jean Giraudoux. The music score was by Michael J. Lewis and the cinematography by Burnett Guffey and Claude Renoir. It was shot at the Victorine Studios in Nice and on location in Paris. The film's sets were designed by the art director Ray Simm.

The film stars Katharine Hepburn with Paul Henreid, Oskar Homolka, Yul Brynner, Richard Chamberlain, Edith Evans and Donald Pleasence.

A musical version of the play titled Dear World with music and lyrics by Jerry Herman, and starring Angela Lansbury, opened with little success on Broadway in 1969.

== Plot ==
The story is set in a 20th-century society endangered by power and greed and imagines the rebellion of the "little people" against corrupt and soulless authority.

A group of prominent men—The Reverend, The General, The Commissar, The Chairman and The Broker—meet at a café to discuss how they can increase their already massive fortunes. The Prospector eventually approaches them with his offer. He says that there is oil in Paris, but requires that each of them share a terrible secret before he tells all. They do, and he reveals that the earth of Chaillot is “soggy with oil.”

They resolve to acquire the mineral rights, with or without the consent of the people of Paris. Countess Aurelia, the "madwoman" of the title, learns of this plan to drill for oil under the very streets of her district from Roderick – an activist and nephew-by-marriage to the Prospector – and The Ragpicker. Among her many eccentricities is starting her day with a paper dated March 22, 1919. She enlists the help of her friends, a motley crew of "little people" who include Constance, who has an invisible dog, and Gabrielle, who has an invisible beau.

The Countess plans to “exterminate” the conspirators, and tries them in her cellar, in absentia. Aurelia's friend Josephine is presiding judge. The Ragpicker serves as counsel for the defense, then asks to speak directly as defendant. Although he swears to lie, steal and distort everything, he tells the truth. His testimony is damning, he is found guilty, and Aurelia is given permission to exterminate the men he represents. Everyone applauds, but Aurelia and the Ragpicker look at each other gravely, with tears in their eyes.

Left alone, Aurelia unlocks the ironbound door to the unknown space below the basement. There is a sound of rushing air. She lies down to take a nap, and when Roderick drapes a boa over her, she dreams that he is her lost love, Alphonse Berteau. Irma listens as Roderick plays along until Aurelia awakes to the real world.

The conspirators arrive on time. Aurelia conducts them to the basement and directs them through the open door: “Straight down, there are no turns.” They disappear into the darkness.

Irma and Roderick come down the stairs. Aurelia asks him to close and lock the heavy door, leaving the key with her. While he is doing so, Aurelia whispers in Irma's ear, “Say that you love him before it's too late,” before time comes between them. Roderick hands Aurelia the key, and the lovers kiss as she leaves them.

In the morning, Aurelia gives the Ragpicker her precious newspaper, saying it's time she moved on to another year.

== Cast ==
- Katharine Hepburn – Countess Aurelia, the Madwoman of Chaillot
- Charles Boyer – The Broker
- Claude Dauphin – Dr. Jadin
- Margaret Leighton – Constance
- Edith Evans – Josephine
- John Gavin – The Reverend
- Giulietta Masina – Gabrielle
- Paul Henreid – The General
- Oskar Homolka – The Commissar
- Nanette Newman – Irma
- Richard Chamberlain – Roderick
- Yul Brynner – The Chairman
- Donald Pleasence – The Prospector
- Danny Kaye – The Ragpicker
- Fernand Gravey – Police sergeant
- Gordon Heath – The Folksinger
- Gerald Sim – Julius
- Gilles Ségal – Deaf Mute

== Release ==
The film had its premiere at The Plaza in New York City on Sunday, October 12, 1969.

== Critical reception ==
In The New York Times, Vincent Canby wrote "Forbes, who persists in making conventional films of unconventional properties ("Whistle Down The Wind", "The Wrong Box") moves his cameras around quite a lot, but there is really little he can do to hide the fact that "The Madwoman of Chaillot" is—as it was 20 years ago—an incredibly precious theatrical conceit, just the sort of thing somebody might think would make a great Broadway musical comedy. As we all know, it didn't."

== See also ==
- List of American films of 1969
