= Ely Landau =

American film producer (1920–1993)

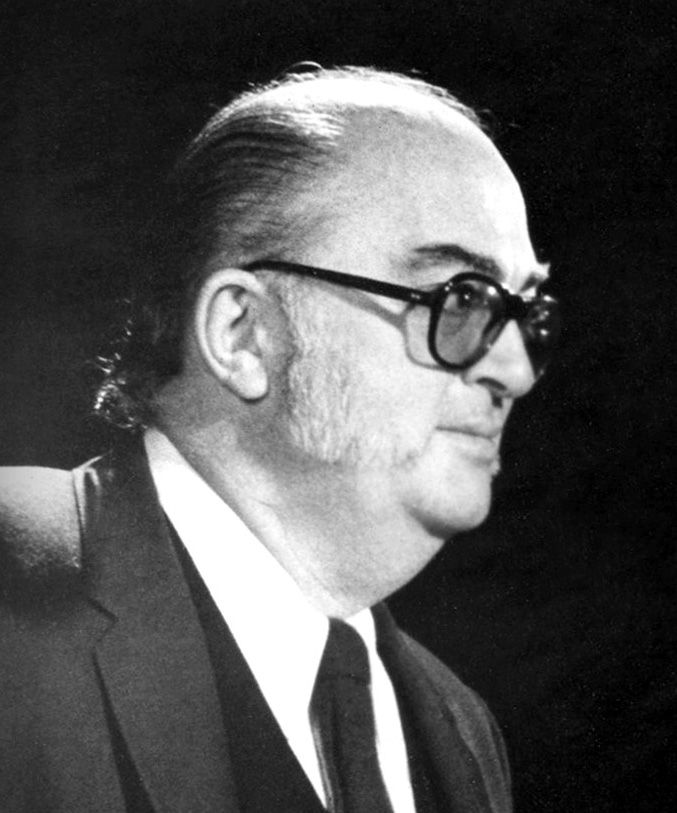
- Landau on the set of King: A Filmed Record... Montgomery to Memphis, c. 1970
- Born: January 20, 1920; New York City, New York, U.S.
- Died: November 4, 1993 (aged 73); Los Angeles, California, U.S.
- Spouse: Edythe Rein
- Children: 5, including Les, Jon, and Tina

Ely Abraham Landau (January 20, 1920 – November 4, 1993) was an American film producer and production executive best remembered for films of plays in the American Film Theatre series.

Landau began working in television as a director and producer in the late 1940s following World War II military service. Landau co-founded National Telefilm Associates, a New York–based television distribution company, with Oliver A. Unger and Harold Goldman in 1954 and subsequently became the president and chairman of the board of the company. Among NTA's assets were television stations including WNTA-TV in Newark, N.J. (now WNET), whose pioneering programming included award-winning shows such as Play of the Week, Open End (hosted by David Susskind), and The Mike Wallace Interviews. Landau won a Peabody Award for The Play of the Week, a series of stage plays mounted for television from 1959 to 1961. NTA, which won praise for being innovative, distributed the series, for which Landau was primarily responsible. In a 1959 interview, he said: "With this I'm bucking the trend. But I don't think any independent station is going to succeed if it just does the Westerns and crime and situation comedy shows that we find everywhere else."

In 1961, Landau and Unger turned to feature-film production, forming the Landau-Unger Company, which produced films such as Long Day's Journey into Night (1962) and The Pawnbroker (1964). The earlier film, a screen rendering of the play by Eugene O'Neill, was shown at the 1962 Cannes Film Festival, where its stars (Katharine Hepburn, Ralph Richardson, Jason Robards and Dean Stockwell) won the Best Actress and Actor awards collectively. The Landau-Unger Company also distributed The Eleanor Roosevelt Story (1965), which won the Academy Award for Best Documentary.

The Landau-Unger Company was sold to Commonwealth United Corporation in 1967, at which time he was named president and CEO. In 1970, he compiled and produced the 185-minute television documentary King: A Filmed Record... Montgomery to Memphis, an account of the public career of the Rev. Dr. Martin Luther King Jr. The documentary was praised as achieving a density and shapeliness that would be rare in any movie, let alone a documentary committed to the sequence of actual events.

Always interested in adapting theatrical productions to film, he founded the American Film Theatre in 1972 to make movie adaptations of stage plays.

== Select producing credits ==
- The Pawnbroker (1965)
- Three Sisters (1966)
- The Madwoman of Chaillot (1969)
- A Delicate Balance (1973)
- The Homecoming (1973)
- Butley (1974)
- The Iceman Cometh (1974)
- Lost in the Stars (1974)
- Luther (1974)
- Rhinoceros (1974)
- Galileo (1975)
- In Celebration (1975)
- The Maids (1975)
- The Man in the Glass Booth (1975)
- The Greek Tycoon (1978)
- Hopscotch (1980)
- Beatlemania: The Movie (1981)
- The Chosen (1981)
- The Holcroft Covenant (1985)
