= Luther (play) =

1961 play

- First edition (Faber & Faber)
- Original language: English
- Written by: John Osborne
- Characters: Martin; Tetzel; Cajetan; Knight; Staupitz
- Genre: Drama
- Setting: Erfurt; Jüterbog; Wittenberg; Worms

Premiere
- Date: 26 June 1961
- Place: Theatre Royal, Nottingham

Luther is a 1961 play by John Osborne depicting the life of Martin Luther, one of the foremost instigators of the Protestant Reformation. Albert Finney created the role of Luther, which he performed with the English Stage Company at the Theatre Royal, Nottingham, the Théâtre Sarah Bernhardt, Paris, the Holland Festival, the Royal Court Theatre, London, the Phoenix Theatre, London, and the St. James Theatre, New York.

The original West End run at the Phoenix ended in March 1962, after 239 performances there, when Finney had to leave the cast to fulfill a contractual obligation with a film company.

Luther won the Tony Award for Best Play in 1964.

== Original London cast ==
The English Stage Company cast for the production at the Royal Court was:

- Knight – Julian Glover
- Prior – James Cairncross
- Martin – Albert Finney
- Hans – Bill Owen
- Lucas – Peter Duguid
- Weinand – Dan Meaden
- Tetzel – Peter Bull
- Staupitz – George Devine
- Cajetan – John Moffatt
- Miltitz – Robert Robinson
- Leo – Charles Kay
- Eck – James Cairncross
- Katherine – Meryl Gourley

The BBC adapted the play for television in 1965 as a Play of the Month.

Robert Shaw portrayed the title role in a 1968 film of the play, which was made for television and shown in the United Kingdom and the United States.

The play was made into a film in 1973, directed by Guy Green, starring Stacy Keach as Martin, with Judi Dench as Luther's wife Katherine, Hugh Griffith as Tetzel, Alan Badel as Cajetan and Maurice Denham as Staupitz.

A 2001 revival at the National Theatre, London, directed by Peter Gill, featured Rufus Sewell in the title role, with Richard Griffiths as Tetzel, Malcolm Sinclair as Cajetan and Timothy West as Staupitz.

== Synopsis ==
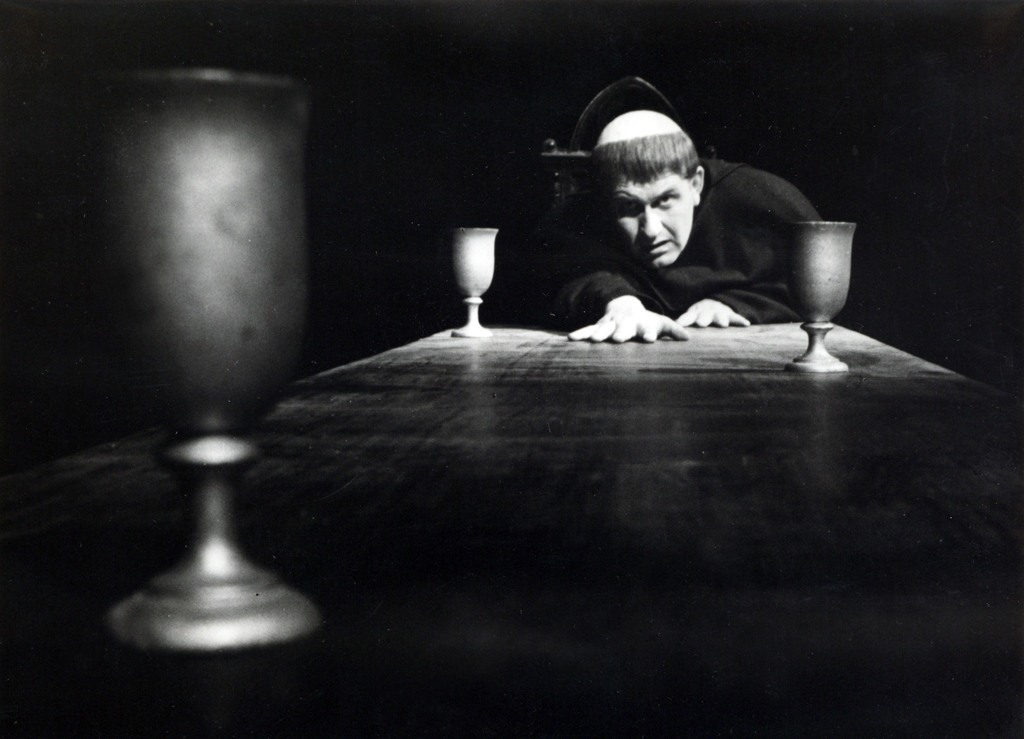
The play by the Ljubljana Drama Theatre in 1962

Act 1
Scene 1 – The Convent of the Augustinian Order of Eremites at Erfurt, 1505

Luther is accepted into St. Augustine's Monastery in Erfurt. His father, Hans, expresses scepticism and scorn for excessive religion. Luther displays anguished guilt at what he believes to be his own imperfections and sins.

Scene 2 – The same. A year later

Luther is preparing to conduct his first Mass as a priest. Another friar, Brother Weinand, tries to persuade him not to exaggerate his own wickedness, and gently dismisses Luther's anxiety as "a few imaginary sins". Luther, is tormented mentally by guilt and physically by constipation.

Scene 3 – Two hours later

In the refectory of the monastery after the celebration of Mass, Luther's father is a guest. He has most reluctantly accepted his son's monastic vocation but has nevertheless made a generous donation to the monastery's funds. He drinks too much at luncheon and his comments make clear his disappointment that his intellectually brilliant son has confined himself to a religious order.

Act 2

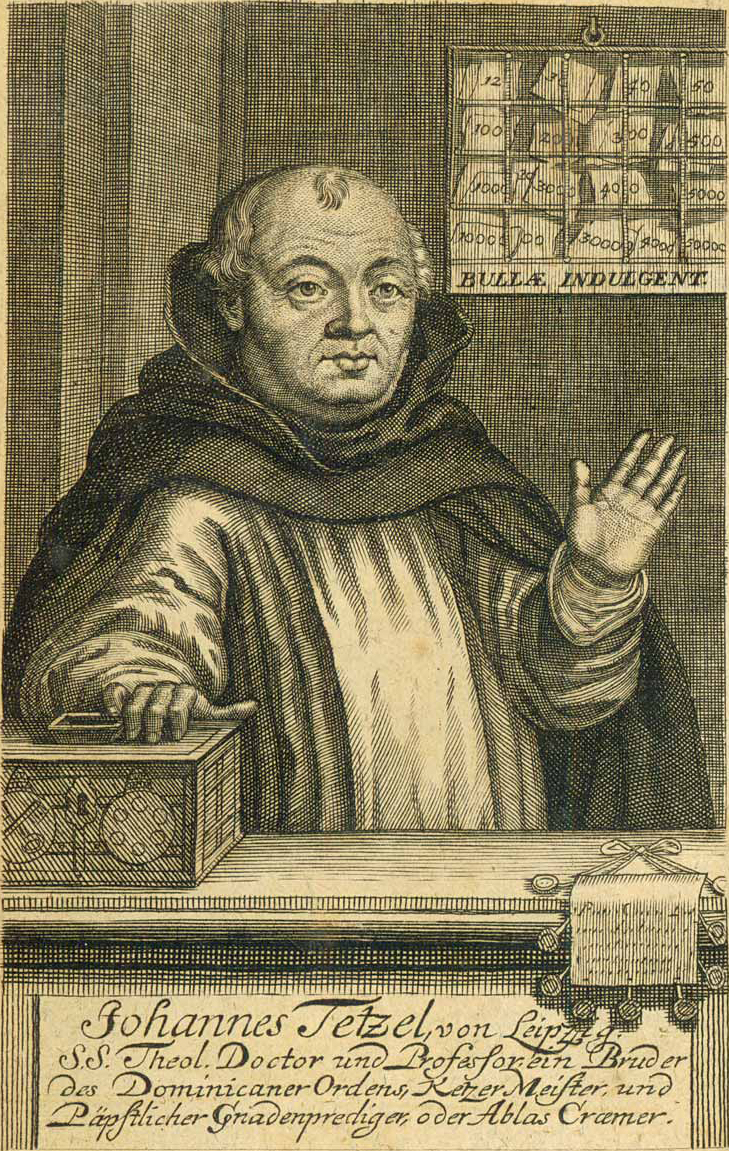
Johann Tetzel

Scene 1 – The Market Place, Jüterbog. 1517

Johann Tetzel, described by Osborne as "an ecclesiastical huckster", addresses a crowd of local people, persuading them to part with their money in exchange for papal indulgences (originally a remission of penance in exchange for a pious donation, but by 1517 represented by such as Tetzel as complete absolution for all sins) .

Scene 2 – The Eremite Cloister, Wittenberg. 1517

The Vicar General of the Augustinian Order, Johann von Staupitz, has sent for Luther. Staupitz respects and admires the young friar, and has much sympathy for Luther's scorn of relics and outrage at indulgences. He counsels Luther to be moderate in his public criticisms.

Scene 3 – The steps of the Castle Church, Wittenberg. Eve of All Saints. 1517

Luther preaches a sermon scorning scholarly sophistication and insisting that faith alone is the key to salvation. He then nails to the church door his 95 theses against indulgences, issued as a challenge to Tetzel or anyone else to engage him in theological debate.

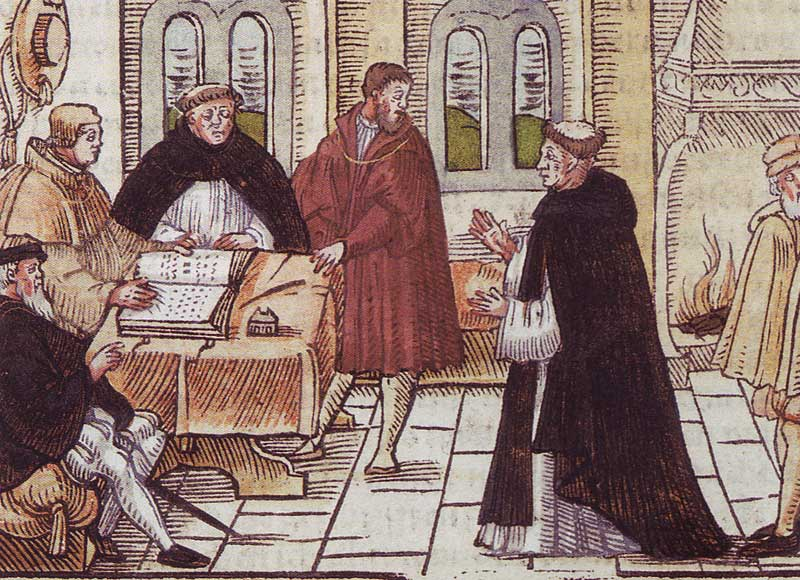
Luther (r.) before Cajetan

Scene 4 – The Fugger Palace, Augsburg. October 1518

Cardinal Cajetan, the Papal Legate to Germany, has sent for Luther. The latter's views are by now seen by the Church as verging on heresy, and Cajetan tries, in vain, to persuade Luther to retract. Cajetan warns that Luther's views, if pursued, will cause the break-up of Christendom.

Scene 5 – A hunting lodge, Magliana, Italy. 1519

Pope Leo X dictates a decree ordaining that unless Luther recants his views, he will be a heretic and will be excommunicated.

Scene 6 – The Elster Gate, Wittenberg. 1520

Luther has by now broken completely from the Roman Catholic Church. He preaches a sermon denouncing the Pope. He burns the papal decree of excommunication and prays for God's support.

Act 3
Scene 1 – The Diet of Worms. 1521

Luther engages in theological debate with Johann von Eck, who represents orthodoxy against Luther's revolutionary preachings. Luther demands that his opponents should refute his arguments by showing that the Bible contradicts them. He rejects the authority of the Pope and of church councils.

Scene 2 – Wittenberg. 1525

A knight, who has until this point merely announced to the audience the time and place of each scene, now has a long speech commenting on the civil disorder that has erupted in the wake of Luther's religious revolution. He engages Luther in conversation, and it emerges that Luther is hostile to the peasant uprising. The knight is deeply disillusioned. Luther prepares to marry an ex-nun.

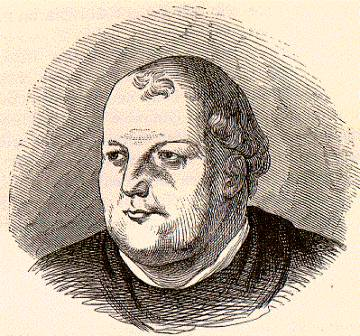
Staupitz

Scene 3 – The Eremite Cloister, Wittenberg. 1530.

Luther and his wife are living in the former monastery. Staupitz, now an old man, visits them, and looks round the building nostalgically. Luther expresses regret at turning Staupitz's world upside down. He is stung when he believes Staupitz disapproves of his siding with the princes against the peasants during the uprisings. Staupitz counsels moderation, as he had done in 1517. He leaves, and Luther muses aloud while cradling his baby son in his arms.

== Critical reception ==
The Times thought the play only a partial success, giving a vivid portrait of Luther the man but not illuminating "the inner compulsions or the external events that turned him into a historical personage." The paper also criticised the proportions of the play: "Time spent on the makings of the monk is rather badly needed when the chronicle comes to the momentous events of his life." The Guardian's critic, W J Weatherby, objected to the play's harping on Luther's constipation at the expense of his spiritual battles: "We get precious little hint of Luther's real struggle".

Kenneth Tynan in The Observer pointed out, in Osborne's defence, that Luther's obsession with his bowels was not the invention of the playwright, but was documented in Erik H Erikson's psychiatric study, Young Man Luther. Of the play as a whole, Tynan wrote:

"We are left with a powerful impression of a man who invented the idea of the individual conscience, responsible to no earthly authority, and was racked by his own invention. … The language is urgent and sinewy, packed with images that derive from bone, blood and marrow; the prose, especially in Luther's sermons, throbs with a rhetorical zeal not often heard in English historical drama since the seventeenth century, mingling gutter candour with cadences that might have come from the pulpit oratory of Donne.

Tynan also noted that reviewing the Paris production, L'Express had lamented Osborne's failure to rival "the dialectic vigour of Sartre, or the poetic vigour of Eliot", a judgment that Tynan considered missed "the quick, stark, lively, lyrical, button-holing virtuosity of Mr. Osborne's language."

Writing of the New York production Howard Taubman said in the New York Times that the play had "size and distinction". The New York Herald Tribune described the play as "an anguished, vigorous and stammering study … not a masterpiece, not even fully coherent, it is an exploration and it wants looking at and thinking about." The New York Daily News called it "a work of power and integrity".

Susan Sontag in the Partisan Review called it "unremittingly vulgar and slapdash in its ideas and its writing" and "phony to the core." She conceded Tony Richardson's "staging, excellent lighting, and bare effective sets" were as "handsome as a picture-book," but argued that this alone, along with the "gimmick of Luther's constipation," drew audiences. "Not one of a hundred of the people who attend this play could possibly have the slightest interest in Luther and his real problems" save for "a quick educational TV-type briefing on A Great Moment in Western History: the Reformation." She contrasted it unfavorably with the films The Flowers of St. Francis and Diary of a Country Priest, describing them as "genuine and psychologically sophisticated."

== Awards and nominations ==
=== Original Broadway production ===
Year	Award	Category	Nominee	Result
1964	Tony Awards	Best Play		Won
1964	Tony Awards	Best Actor in a Play	Albert Finney	Nominated

== Gallery ==
Programme from the 1961 production at the Phoenix Theatre in London
