= Luther (2003 film) =

2003 American-German historical drama film

- Theatrical release poster
- Directed by: Eric Till
- Written by: Camille Thomasson; Bart Gavigan
- Produced by: Brigitte Rochow; Christian P. Stehr; Alexander Thies
- Starring: Joseph Fiennes; Alfred Molina; Jonathan Firth; Claire Cox; Peter Ustinov
- Cinematography: Robert Fraisse
- Music by: Richard Harvey
- Production companies: Eikon Film; NFP Teleart Berlin
- Distributed by: R.S. Entertainment (U.S.); United International Pictures (Germany); Overseas Filmgroup (international)
- Release dates: 26 September 2003 (U.S.); 30 October 2003 (Germany)
- Running time: 124 minutes
- Countries: United States; Germany
- Language: English
- Budget: $31 million
- Box office: $29,413,900

Luther is a 2003 historical drama film dramatizing the life of Protestant Christian reformer Martin Luther. It is directed by Eric Till and stars Joseph Fiennes in the title role. Alfred Molina, Jonathan Firth, Claire Cox, Bruno Ganz, and Sir Peter Ustinov (in his final film before his death the following year) co-star. The film covers Luther's life from his becoming a friar in 1505, to his trial before the Diet of Augsburg in 1530. The American-German co-production was partially funded by Thrivent Financial for Lutherans, a Christian financial services company.

== Plot ==
The film begins during a thunderstorm in 1505, as Luther is returning to his home. For fear of losing his life in the storm, Luther commits his life to God and becomes an Augustinian friar.

Two years later, Luther is a friar at St. Augustine's Monastery in Erfurt. During his time at the monastery, he is constantly troubled by viewing God as a God of hate and vengeance. Martin is encouraged by Johann von Staupitz, an elder friar who is his supervisor and mentor. Staupitz tells Luther to look to Christ instead of himself.

Later, Luther delivers a letter for Staupitz to Rome, where he becomes troubled by the wicked lifestyles of those in the city. He also views the skull believed to be that of John the Baptist and purchases an indulgence. It is during this time that Luther begins to question the veracity of indulgences. Returning to Germany, Luther is sent to Wittenberg, where he begins to teach his congregation that God is not a God of hate, but a God of love. Luther begins to emphasize the love of God instead of his judgment.

In 1513, Pope Leo X becomes the new Pope of the Church, and commissions Johann Tetzel to go throughout several communities, including Luther's town, where he scares people into buying indulgences, which would be used to rebuild and renovate St. Peter's Basilica in Rome, and to recover the Hohenzollern bribes to the Holy See, advanced by Fugger, for the investiture of Archbishop Albert of Mainz and Magdeburg. In his church, Luther denounces the indulgences, calling them "just a piece of paper". He then posts his 95 theses on the door of the church, calling for an open debate regarding the indulgences. For this act, Luther is called in 1518 to Augsburg, where he is questioned by Cardinal Cajetan among other church officials.

After his excommunication, Pope Leo X orders Luther to be delivered to Rome, but Prince-elector Frederick the Wise of Saxony becomes his protector. Frederick and Charles V decide that Luther will be tried at the Diet of Worms.

At Worms, Luther is brought before Charles V and the Cardinals for trial. The Cardinals demand for him to recant of his teachings, and Luther requests more time to give a decent answer, which is granted. The next day, Luther comes before Charles V and the Cardinals, who demand him to recant, and Luther refuses. After his trial at Worms, Luther is forced into hiding by Frederick the Wise who protects him by moving him into Wartburg Castle, while his former professor, Andreas Karlstadt, encourages the Great Peasants' Revolt against the oppressive nobles. Luther, shocked by the revolts, encourages the princes to put them down. Meanwhile, Luther translates the Bible into German.

After Luther marries Katharina von Bora, a former nun, Charles V summons the evangelical Princes of the Holy Roman Empire to the Diet of Augsburg, so he can force them to outlaw Protestantism and the German Bible. The nobles refuse, and Charles is forced to allow the nobles to read their Augsburg Confession.

The film ends with the following words:

What happened at Augsburg pushed open the door of religious freedom. Martin Luther lived for another 16 years, preaching and teaching the Word. He and Katharina von Bora enjoyed a happy marriage and six children. Luther's influence extended into economics, politics, education and music, and his translation of the Bible became a foundation stone of the German language. Today over 540 million people worship in churches inspired by his Reformation.

== Cast ==
- Joseph Fiennes as Martin Luther
- Alfred Molina as Johann Tetzel
- Jonathan Firth as Girolamo Aleander
- Claire Cox as Katharina von Bora
- Peter Ustinov as Frederick the Wise
- Bruno Ganz as Johann von Staupitz
- Uwe Ochsenknecht as Pope Leo X
- Mathieu Carrière as Cardinal Cajetan
- Benjamin Sadler as Spalatin
- Jochen Horst as Professor Karlstadt
- Torben Liebrecht as Charles V
- Maria Simon as Hanna
- Lars Rudolph as Melanchthon
- Marco Hofschneider as Ulrick
- Christopher Buchholz as Johann von der Eck
- Timothy Peach as Karl von Miltitz
- Michael Traynor as Hans Luther
- Tom Strauss as George of Brandenburg
- Gene Reed as John of Saxony
- Anian Zollner as Philip of Hesse
- Johannes Lang as Archbishop of Mainz
- Jeff Boyd as Prior
- Jeff Caster as Matthew
- Anatole Taubman as Otto

== Historical inaccuracies ==
- In the film, Luther refers to Bible passages by the book, chapter, and verse. However, the Bible was not divided into verses until 1551, and even then, the divisions were not ubiquitous until the Geneva Bible. (It can be assumed that this was done so that discerning viewers might easily locate the text to which Luther refers.)
- Albert of Mainz is described as being archbishop of two German territories before acquiring Mainz. In reality, he was Prince-Archbishop of Magdeburg and Prince-Bishop of Halberstadt, prior to gaining Mainz.
- During the Augsburg Confession scene, all of the nobles, including the prince-electors, stood up to Charles V. In real life, most of the princes were still Catholic. Only one (or maybe two) of the seven electors would have made a stand, Duke of Saxony and the somewhat conciliant Louis V, Elector Palatine. Three other electors were Catholic archbishops, such as Albert of Mainz, and two more secular electors sided with the Catholics, the King of Bohemia, Charles's brother Ferdinand, and Joachim Nestor of Brandenburg, Albert's brother. After the Elector of Saxony and Philip of Hesse, the staunchest opposition came from Georg [the Pious], Prince-Margrave of Brandenburg-Ansbach.
- The film stated that Luther and Spalatin went to law school together. In reality, they did not meet until much later.
- The film implies that Frederick of Saxony was given the Golden Rose as a bribe to deliver Luther to Rome. In real life, he had already been awarded the rose, most likely to make him run for emperorship against Charles.
- Aleander addresses Cajetan as cardinal in his first appearance, which apparently takes place shortly after the papal conclave that elected Leo X in 1513. In reality, Cajetan did not become a cardinal until four years later.
- The film regularly portrays congregants seated in pews. In reality, pews were not a common church fixture until after the Reformation.
- Leo X is veiled by the cardinals in black mourning garments, when the popes are buried in red liturgical color.
- Andreas Karlstadt is depicted as radically distorting Luther's views while Luther is in seclusion at Wartburg, insisting on being addressed as "Brother Andreas." Though the reforms actually orchestrated by Karlstadt were more peaceful, they were too radical for Luther (including vernacularization of the Mass), and Luther began to undo or slow them. Karlstadt also did not renounce his title of professor until after Luther's return.
- Shortly before Prince Frederick convinces Charles to give Luther a hearing at the Diet of Worms, the Emperor introduces Aleander to him as a "new cardinal", and Aleander's dress supports that. Aleander would in fact not become a cardinal for another 15 years.
- It is implied in the film that Luther and Katharina married shortly after the death of Pope Leo X. In reality, Leo died over a year before Luther and Katharina had even met.
- At the end of the movie, Luther goes to the study of Duke Frederick with a "birthday gift." He hands the duke a copy of the New Testament in German. There is no historical evidence that Duke Frederick and Martin Luther ever met or spoke face to face.

== Reception ==
The review aggregator Rotten Tomatoes reported an approval rating of 45%, with an average score of 5.2/10, based on 62 reviews. The website's consensus reads, "This cinematic treatment of Martin Luther's life is more dull than inspiring." Metacritic gave the film a weighted average score of 47 out of 100, based on 23 critics, indicating "mixed or average" reviews.

Roger Ebert gave the film two stars of four, and wrote:

I don't know what kind of movie I was expecting Luther to be, or what I wanted from it, but I suppose I anticipated that Luther himself would be an inspiring figure, filled with the power of his convictions. What we get is an apologetic outsider with low self-esteem, who reasons himself into a role he has little taste for.
