= Martin Luther, Heretic =

- Directed by: Norman Stone
- Written by: William Nicholson
- Produced by: David M. Thompson
- Starring: Jonathan Pryce; Maurice Denham; Hugh Dickson; John Nettleton; Clive Swift; Hugh Laurie
- Cinematography: Keith Hopper
- Edited by: Pauline Dykes
- Music by: Roger Limb
- Distributed by: British Broadcasting Corporation (BBC); Family Films; Concordia Films
- Release dates: 8 November 1983 (U.K.); 10 November 1983 (U.S.)
- Running time: 70 minutes
- Countries: United Kingdom; United States
- Language: English

Martin Luther, Heretic is a 1983 film made for television, to commemorate the 500th anniversary of the birth of Martin Luther. It was released on 8 November 1983 in the United Kingdom, two days before the 500th jubilee on 10 November. It starred Jonathan Pryce as Martin Luther. Maurice Denham reprised his role of Johann von Staupitz that he played in the 1973 American Film Theater film Luther. The time frame of the film is 1506-1522: the beginning of Luther's monastic vocation to his return from exile at the Wartburg in 1522. A medieval dramatic troupe's performances of mystery plays provide the unifying motif for a parallel telling of the story of the film. When Luther's carriage en route from the Wartburg to Wittenberg it is shown passing an actor wearing a devil's mask. When this scene is revisited at the end of the film, the actor slips this mask off his face.

== Historical inconsistencies ==
Some could interpret the portrayal of Martin Luther returning to Wittenberg, which occurred in early 1522, as his approving of the radical changes instigated by Andreas Karlstadt the year before. However, historically, Luther opposed some of the changes as well as the rashness of the changes he did approve of. The movie makes the out-break of the radical changes the instigation of his return thus implying, probably rightly, the need he felt to moderate them. He preached his "Invocavit Sermons" against this radical reform in Wittenberg, and he had some of the changes rolled back.

== Cast ==
- Jonathan Pryce - Martin Luther
- Maurice Denham - Father Staupitz
- John Nettleton - Andreas Karlstadt
- Clive Swift - Johann Tetzel
- Philip Stone - Johann Eck
- David de Keyser - Duke Frederick
- Hugh Dickson - Georg Spalatin
- Jon Croft - Berlepsch
- Valentine Dyall - Chancellor
- Pip Miller - Captain
- John Byron - Papal Nuncio
- Eric Francis - Keeper of Relics
- Timothy Ackroyd - Student
- Neal Swettenham - Student
- James Kirby - Emperor
