= Ernst Otto Schlick =

German naval engineer

Ernst Otto Schlick (16 June 1840, Grimma – 10 April 1913, Hamburg) was a German naval engineer. He tried to solve the problem of rolling of ships at sea by installing large gyroscopes. The gyroscopic "stabilizers" gave disappointing or dangerous results in practice. An Englishman before him in 1868, Henry Bessemer had tried to use hydraulics and a spirit level watched by the steersman to stabilize ship rolls, also with dangerous results.

The gyroscopic stabilizer idea was later developed further by the US American inventor Elmer Ambrose Sperry but this system could hold the ship at an extreme angle for prolonged periods. By the time these stabilizers were abandoned, gyroscopes had already found their place in ship navigation as gyrocompasses and in control systems.

== Life and career ==
Schlick studied at the Dresden Technical University from 1858. In 1863 in Dresden he founded a dockyard and engineering workshop which was later bought by Austrians. From 1869 to 1875 he worked as a naval engineer, firstly in Pest and then in Fiume, both in the Austro-Hungarian Empire. In 1875, he became managing director of the Norddeutsche Schiffbau-Gesellschaft in Kiel, where he oversaw the building of many freight steamers and also some warships, including the German Royal Yacht Hohenzollern. From 1882 to 1895 he was director of the German office of the international ship registration institute, Bureau Veritas, in Hamburg. From 1896 until his retirement in 1908 he was director of Germanischer Lloyd, another ship registration institute in Hamburg, where he encouraged better design for fast steam ships.

== Contributions to engineering ==
Together with A. van Hüllen, he translated Sir William H White's "A manual of naval architecture" into German (English original published in 1877, German version published in Leipzig in 1879). He wrote a handbook for iron ship construction ("Handbuch für den Eisenschisfbau") which was published in Leipzig in 1890.

In addition to his work on the rolling movement of ships, he investigated how to reduce vibrations in steam-engine driven ships, inventing an instrument to measure those vibrations.

== Books ==
- "Handbuch für den Schiffbau" White W H (Leipzig, 1879)
- "Handbuch für den Eisenschiffbau" Schlick E O (Leipzig, 1890)

== Sources ==
- Online biography (in German)
- Brockhaus Encyclopedia 1894-6
