= Grimma =

Town in Saxony, Germany

- Town
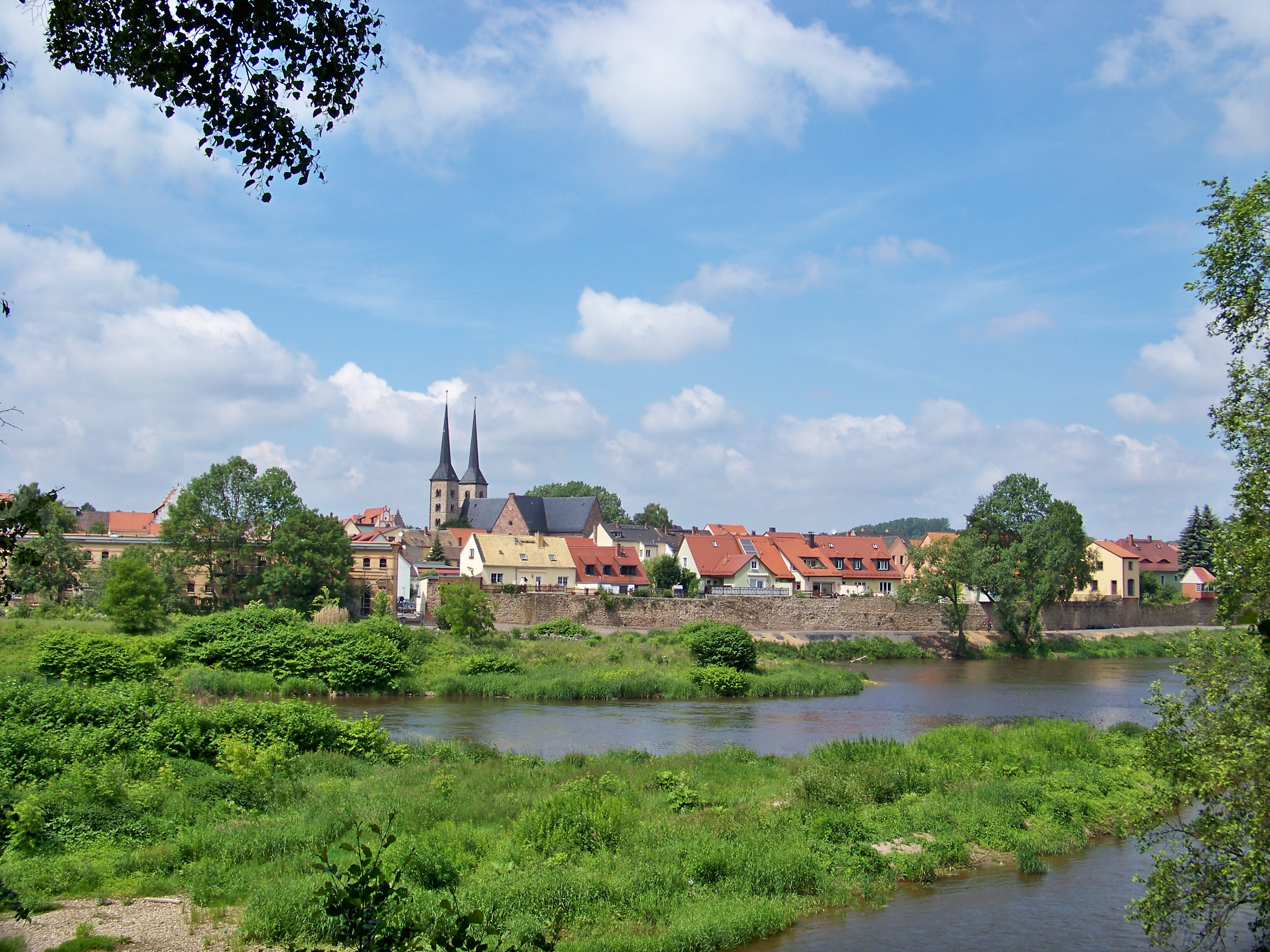

- Coat of arms

- Location of Grimma within Leipzig district
- Interactive map of Grimma
- Location within Germany Location within Saxony
- Coordinates: 51°14′19″N 12°43′31″E
- Country: Germany
- State: Saxony
- District: Leipzig

Government
  - Mayor (2022–29): Matthias Berger

Area
  - Total: 218.25 km^{2} (84.27 sq mi)
- Elevation: 128 m (420 ft)

Population (2025-12-31)
  - Total: 27,554
  - Density: 126.25/km^{2} (326.99/sq mi)
- Time zone: UTC+01:00 (CET)
  - Summer (DST): UTC+02:00 (CEST)
- Postal codes: 04668
- Dialling codes: 03437
- Vehicle registration: L, BNA, GHA, GRM, MTL, WUR
- Website: www.grimma.de

Grimma (German pronunciation: [ˈɡʁɪma]; Upper Sorbian: Grima, pronounced [ˈɡʁʲima]) is a town in Saxony, Central Germany, on the left bank of the Mulde, 25 kilometres (16 mi) southeast of Leipzig. Founded in c. 1170, it is part of the Leipzig district.

== Location ==
The town is in northern Saxony, 25 kilometres (16 miles) southeast of Leipzig and 16 kilometres (9.9 mi) south of Wurzen.

=== Flooding ===
The river Mulde flows through the town, a significant section of which is situated in a floodplain. Massive floods in 2002 washed away the old Pöppelmannbrücke bridge and caused significant damage to buildings in the town. In the summer of 2013 there was further flood damage.

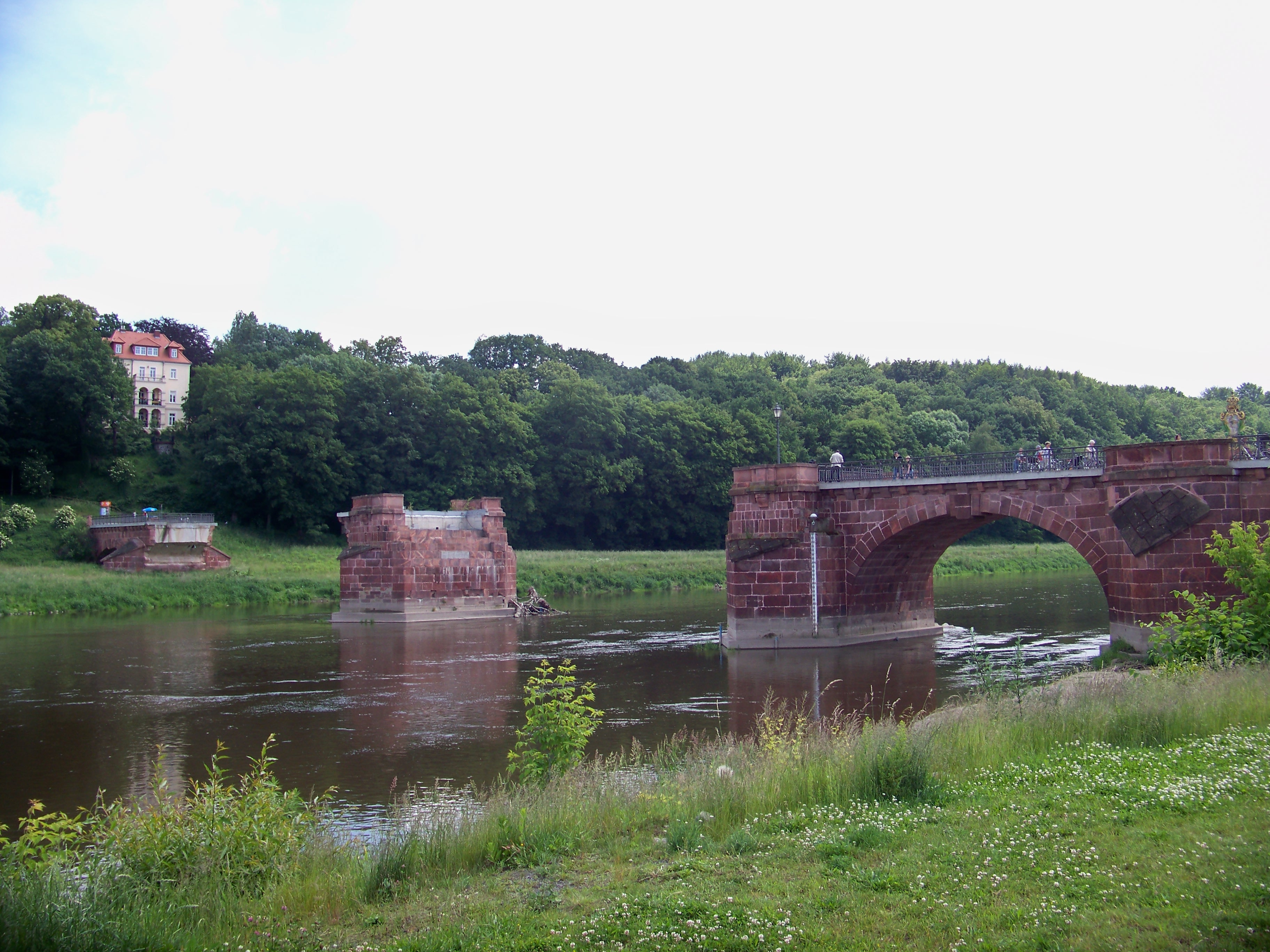
Destroyed Pöppelmannbrücke

=== Suburbs ===
- Großbardau (merged with Grimma January 2006)
- Döben
- Hohnstädt
- Höfgen
- Beiersdorf
- Kaditzsch
- Schkortitz
- Naundorf
- Neunitz
- Grechwitz
- Dorna
- Kleinbardau (merged with Grimma January 2006)
- Bernbruch (merged with Grimma 2006)
- Waldbardau (merged with Grimma 2006)
- Nerchau (merged with Grimma 2011)
- Thümmlitzwalde (merged with Grimma 2011)
- Großbothen (merged with Grimma 2011)
- Mutzschen (merged with Grimma 1 January 2012)

== History ==
Map of Grimma (1763)

Grimma is of Sorbian origin and was first documented in 1065. The Margraves of Meissen and the Electors of Saxony often resided at the castle in the town.

The town was chosen as one of three government elite boarding schools, the 'Princely Schools of Saxony', in 1550. The purpose of these schools was to educate future civil servants and to prepare them for further studies at universities which is why a number of historical personalities are biographically related to this rather small town. The Gymnasium St. Augustine still exists today as one of only a few public boarding schools in Saxony.

Grimma was the scene of witch trials between 1494 and 1701. At least two women were executed as witches.

Due to the town being located at the second main railway line between Leipzig and Dresden (via Meissen), the town developed well in the 19th century.

By 1890 the population had reached 8,957.

The town was affected by heavy flooding in 2013. Work had by this time started on the construction of flood barriers, but their completion had been delayed by local opposition.

In 2017, the Confessional Evangelical Lutheran Conference held their international, triennial convention in Grimma.

== Culture ==
Grimma has been the site of many historic structures, including a town hall dating from 1442, a famous school (the Fürstenschule) erected on the site of a former Augustinian monastery in 1550, and a school of brewing.

== Twin towns – sister cities ==
The city is twinned with:

- Bron, France
- Gezer, Israel
- Leduc, Canada
- Rüdesheim, Germany
- Weingarten, Germany

== Notable people ==
- Albert III, Duke of Saxony (1443–1500)
- Catherine of Saxony, Archduchess of Austria (1468–1524)
- Ernst Otto Schlick (1840–1913), engineer
- Georg Elias Müller (1850–1934), psychologist
- Erich Waschneck (1887–1970), playwright
- Diethard Hellmann (1928–1999), musician
- Verena Reichel (born 1945), translator
- Ulrich Mühe (1953–2007), actor
- Carmen Nebel (born 1956), TV moderator
- Olaf Beyer (born 1957), athlete
- Matthias Lindner (born 1965), footballer
- Torsten Kracht (born 1967), footballer
- Jochen Kupfer (born 1969), operatic baritone
- Marina Schuck (born 1981), sprint canoer
- Ronny Garbuschewski (born 1986), footballer

== Gallery ==
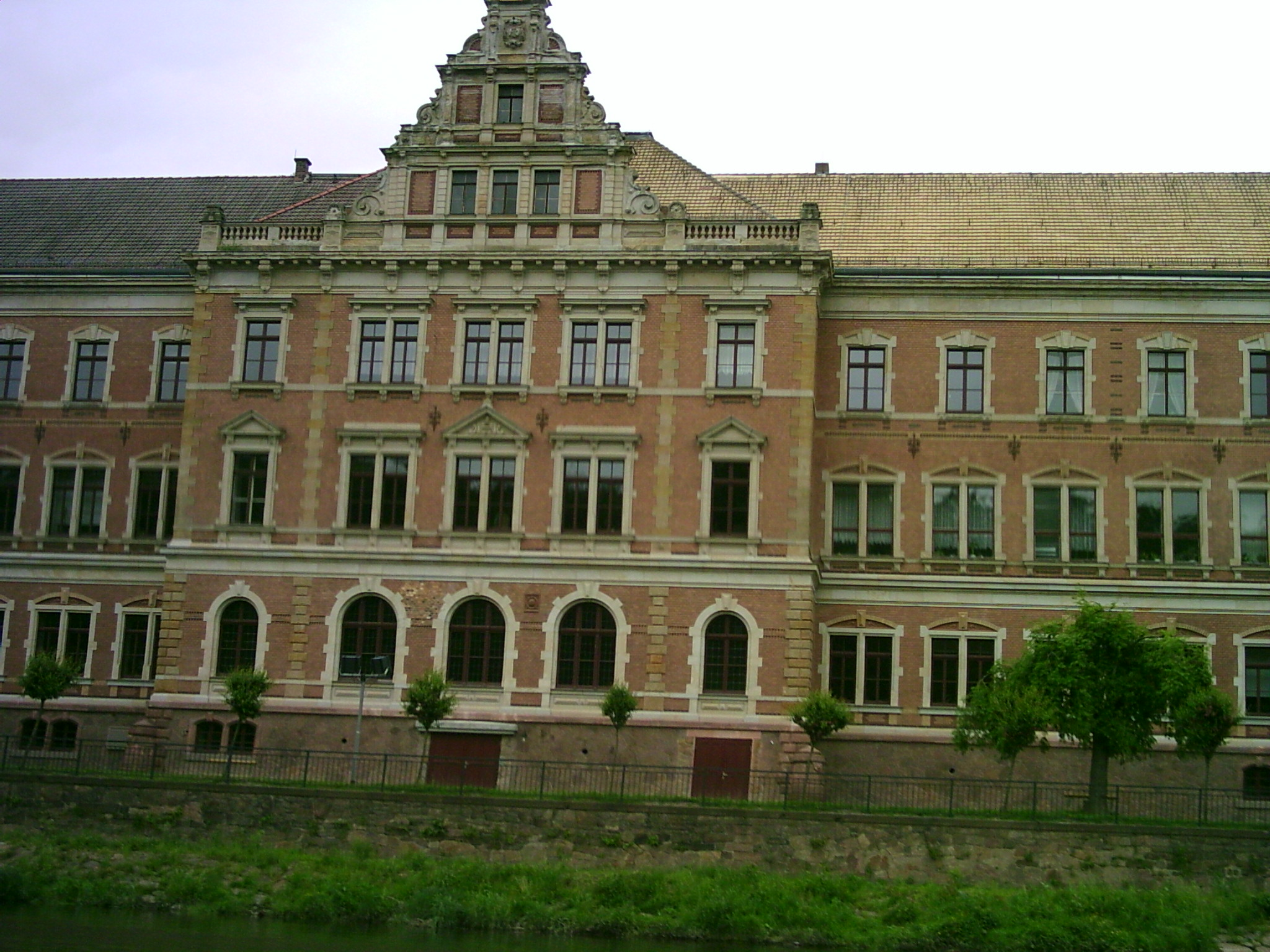
The High School St. Augustine of Grimma

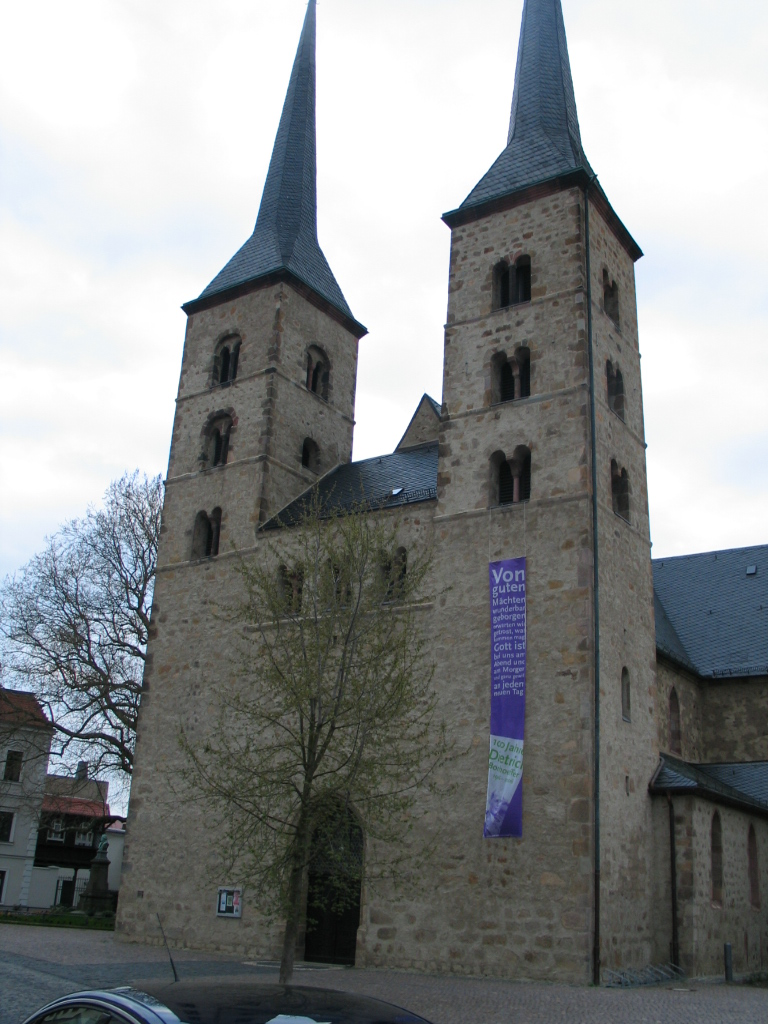
Frauenkirche

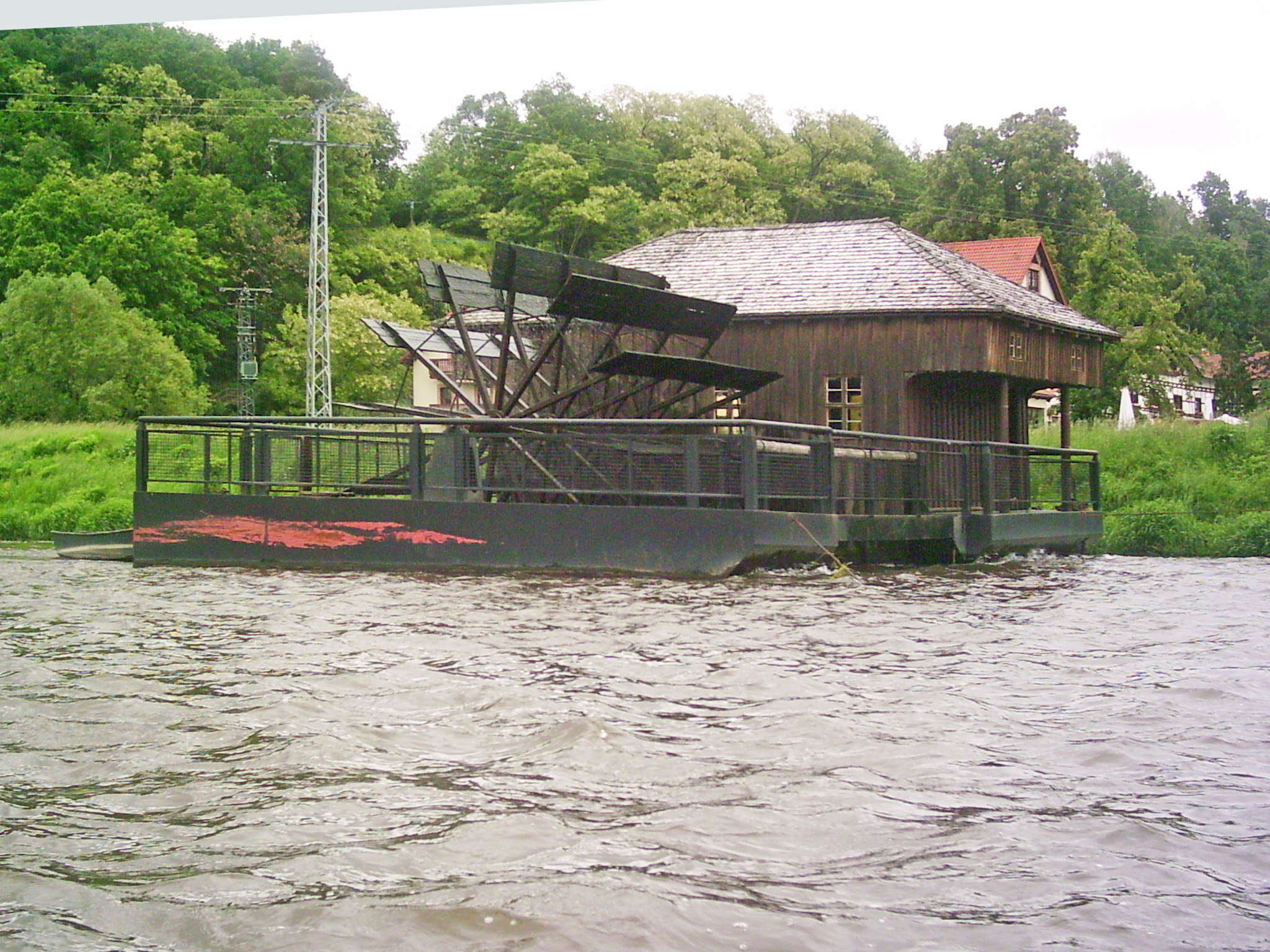
Sawmill Höfgen

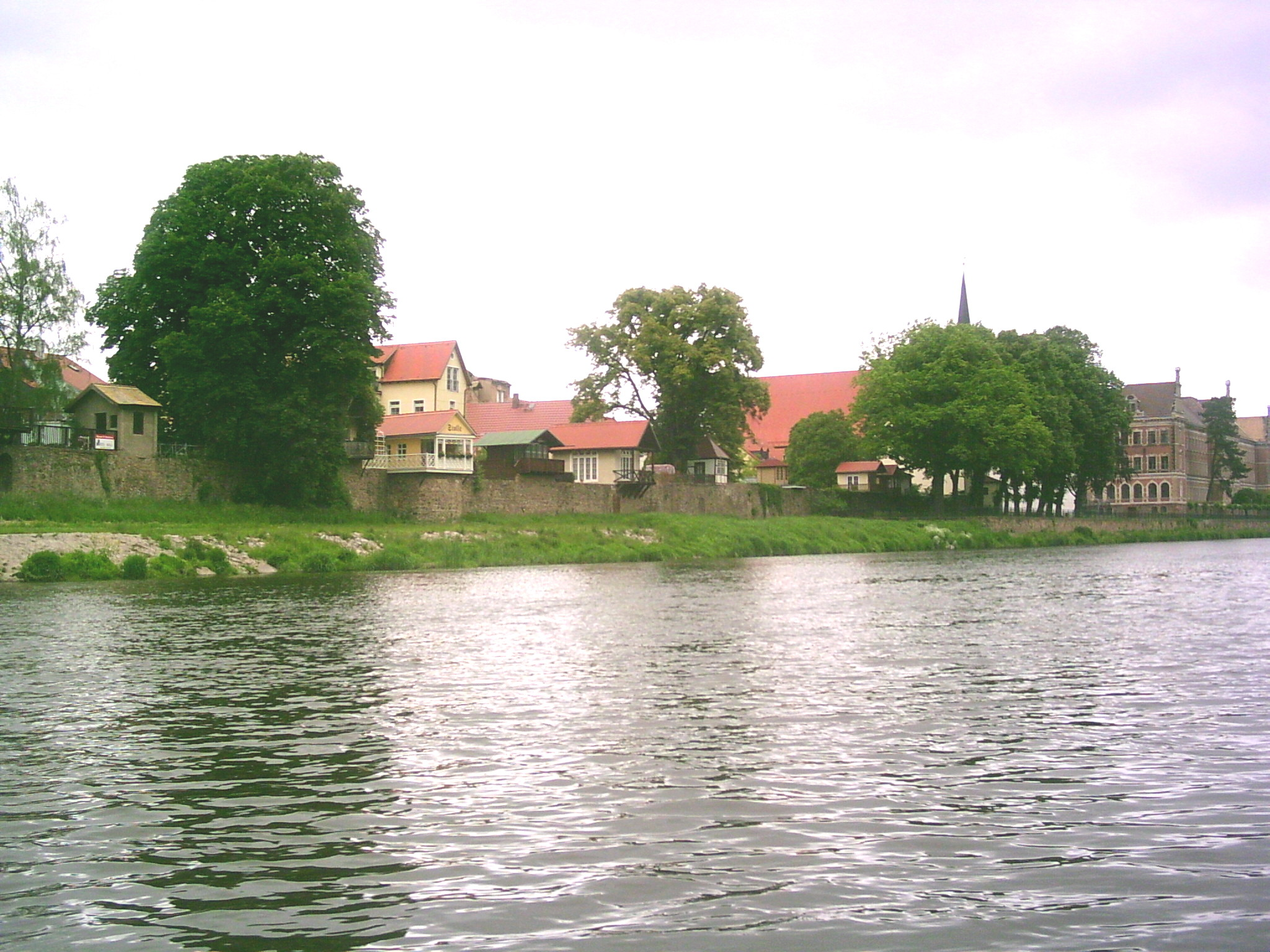
Old town as seen from the Mulde river

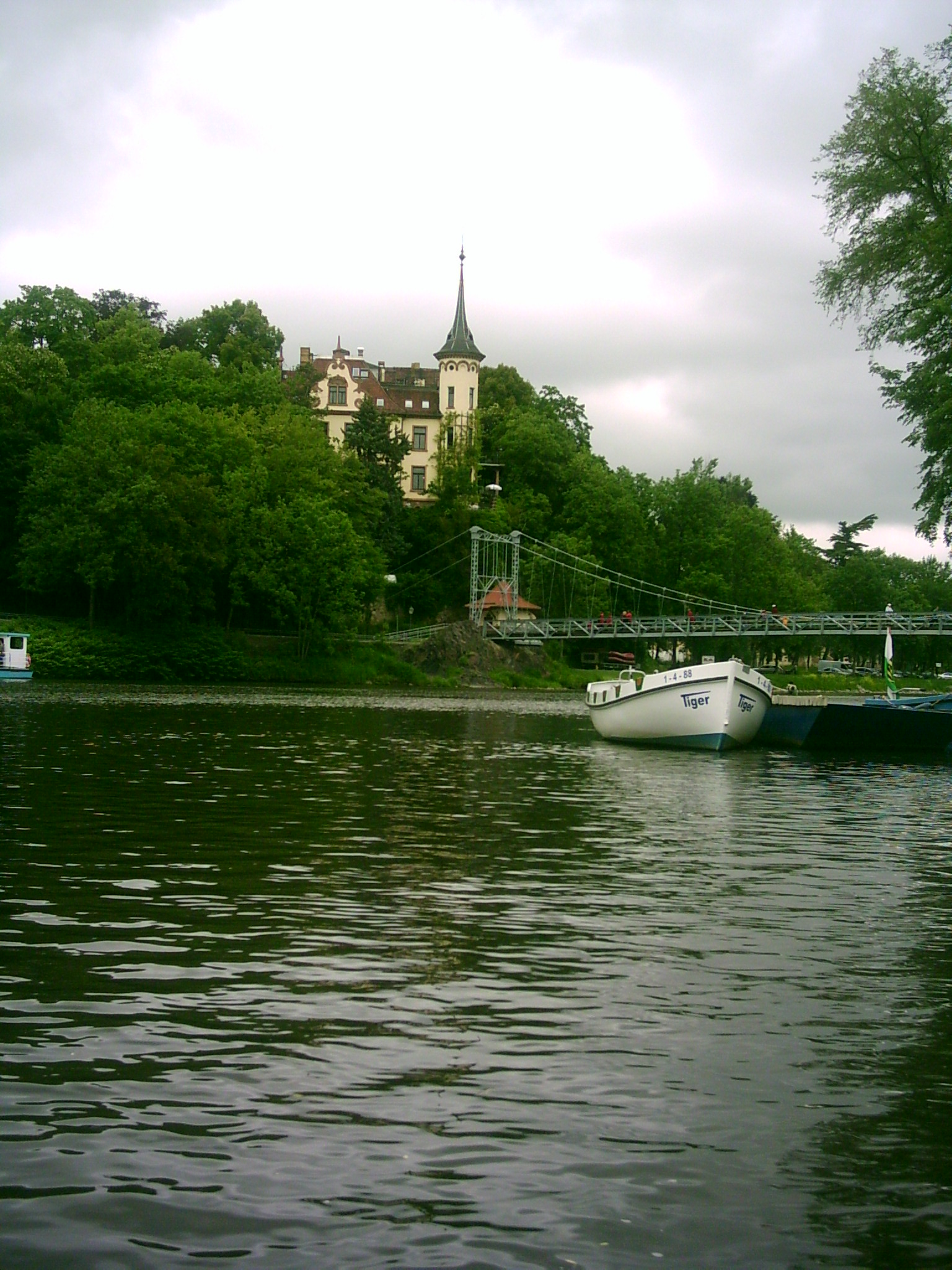
The bank of the Mulde

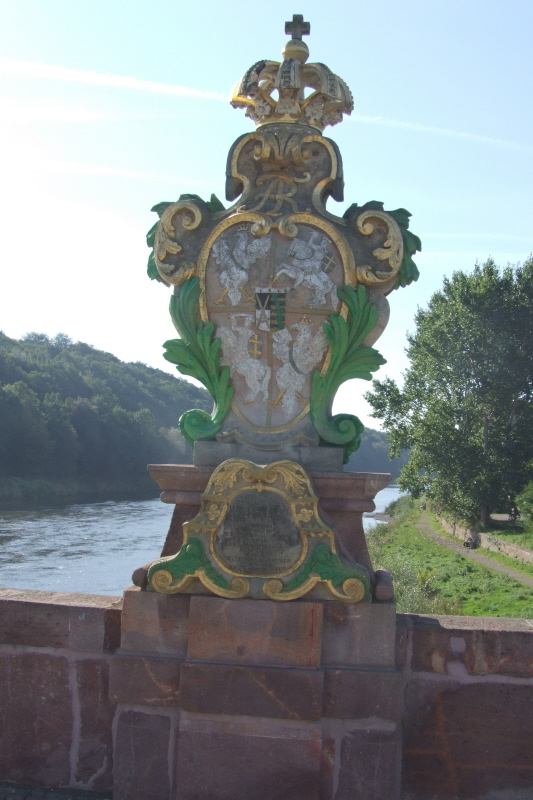
Armorial bearings on a bridge over Mulde in Grimma

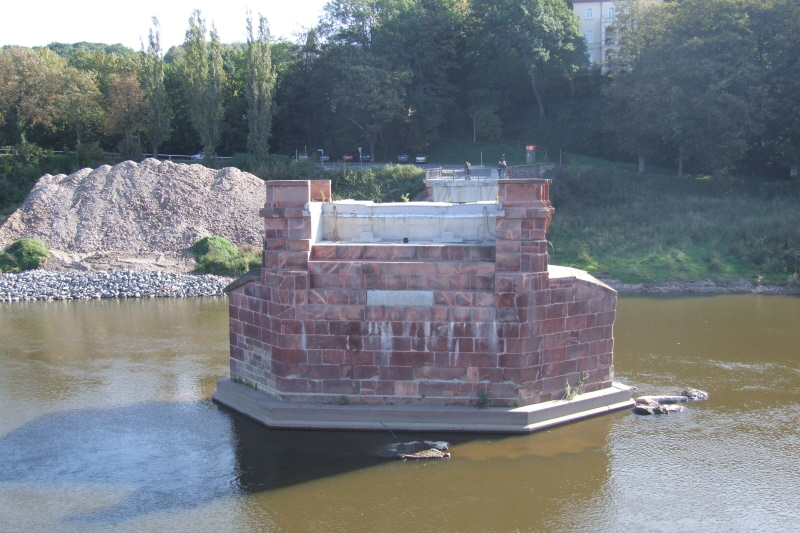
Destroyed bridge over Mulde in Grimma

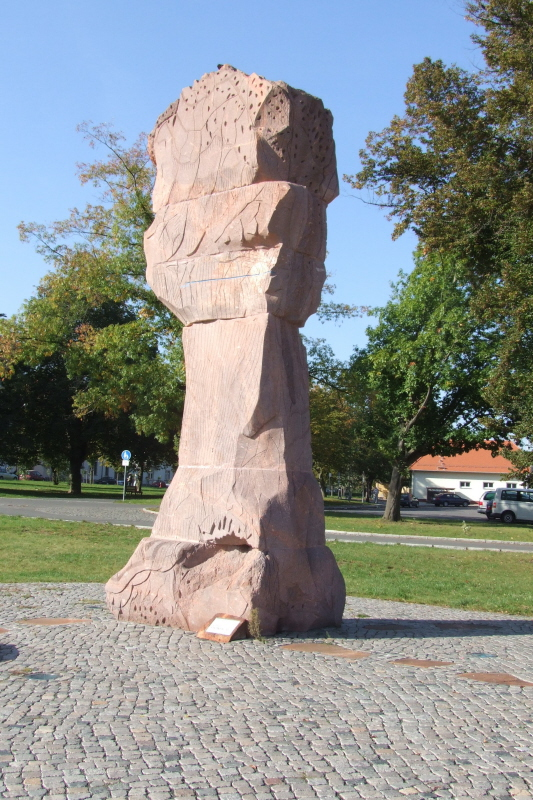
Memorial to the flood disaster 2002 in Grimma
