= The Last Salute =

British comedy television series (1998-1999)

- Genre: Comedy
- Written by: Tim Binding; Simon Nye
- Directed by: Graeme Harper; Keith Washington
- Starring: Paul Bown; Philip Jackson; Claire Cox
- Composer: Ray Russell
- Country of origin: United Kingdom
- Original language: English
- No. of series: 2
- No. of episodes: 12

Production
- Producers: Mike Stephens; Garrie Mallen
- Running time: 30 minutes
- Production company: BBC

Original release
- Network: BBC One
- Release: 15 March 1998 – 29 August 1999

The Last Salute is a British comedy television series that first aired on BBC One 15 March 1998 to 29 August 1999. The series follows the misadventures of an AA patrolman in Hampshire in the early 1960s.

Actors who appeared in various episodes include Christopher Villiers, Hilary Mason, John Junkin, Eva Gray, Lill Roughley, Paul Brooke, Christopher Benjamin, Frances White, and Geoffrey Beevers.

== Plot summary ==
Set in 1961, during the days of happy motoring and when AA patrolmen were duty-bound to salute to every passing passenger that bore an AA badge on their vehicle. The story focuses on a hapless AA patrolman Harry Thorpe (Paul Bown), who has troubles with his job and frequently has problems with his superior AA Inspector Leonard Spanwick (Philip Jackson), whom also happens to lives in a caravan in Harry's back garden and is romantically involved with his blowsy sister Joyce (Jo Unwin). Leonard often makes Harry's life difficult, and he struggles to keep his local branch (of the AA) afloat and recruit new members, which is compounded by the intense competition from the rival RAC organisation, who are keen to drain away their trade. Although he is dedicated to his job, Harry often has difficulty trying to keep up to date with some of the organisation's advancements over recent years.

== Main cast ==
- Paul Bown as Harry Thorpe
- Philip Jackson as Leonard Spanwick
- Jo Unwin as Joyce Thorpe
- Claire Cox as Catherine Heaseman
- Ben Pullen as Robin Pettifer
- David Shane as Roy Munce
- Paul Young as Mr. Bannerman
- Brett Fancy as Johnny Lupus

== Episodes ==
=== Series 1 (1998) ===
No. overall	No. in series	Title	Original release date
1	1	"Happy Motoring"	15 March 1998
2	2	"Come Dancing"	22 March 1998
3	3	"Bono Mateno"	29 March 1998
4	4	"The Youngish Ones"	5 April 1998
5	5	"One for the Road"	12 April 1998
6	6	"French Leave"	19 April 1998

=== Series 2 (1999) ===
No. overall	No. in series	Title	Original release date
7	1	"Laundry"	25 July 1999
8	2	"Bank Holiday"	1 August 1999
9	3	"War"	8 August 1999
10	4	"Twins"	15 August 1999
11	5	"Moonlighting"	22 August 1999
12	6	"Eve of Destruction"	29 August 1999
