= Claire Cox =

British actress

Claire Cox is a British actress. Her television appearances include acclaimed series The Last Salute, Fresh Meat, Spooks, Wallander and Jamestown for Sky.

== Career ==
Cox graduated from the Central School of Speech and Drama with a B.A. degree in acting. One of her first jobs after graduating was playing Fredrika Armfeldt in Stephen Sondheim's A Little Night Music at the National Theatre with Judi Dench.

She then joined the Royal Shakespeare Company for the first of three seasons with the company. She played Portia in Edward Hall's production of Julius Caesar, in which she was awarded an Ian Charleson commendation. She returned to the company in the critically-acclaimed Spanish Golden age season. Other theatre work includes A Servant To Two Masters (RSC), The Voysey Inheritance (National Theatre), Henry V at the Manchester Royal Exchange, The White Devil at the Chocolate Factory theatre, The Winslow Boy (The Rose Theatre Kingston), and Macbeth at The Globe Theatre), as well as The Tricycle Theatre's "Women, Power and Politics" season.

Her film credits include The Leading Man, Shooting Fish and Luther (2003 film). Selected TV credits include The Last Salute series, Every Woman knows a Secret, The Choir (1995), A Touch of Frost, Your Mother Should Know, Spooks, Wallander, Poirot, Fresh Meat and Jamestown. In 2023, she appeared in the BBC soap opera Doctors as Simone Rigby.

== Personal life ==
She is married to actor Tom Vaughan-Lawlor. They have one son.
