= Johann Tetzel =

German Dominican friar and seller of indulgences (c. 1465–1519)

Johann Tetzel OP
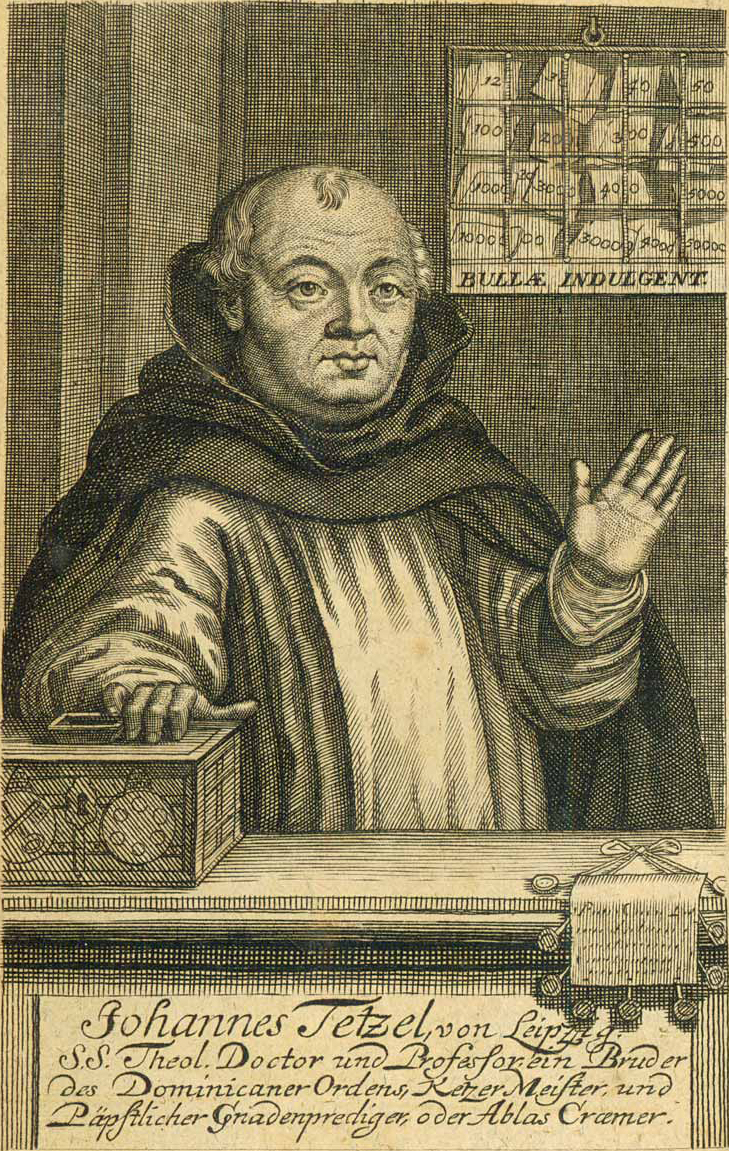
- Born: c. 1465; Pirna, Electorate of Saxony
- Died: 11 August 1519 (aged 53–54); Leipzig, Electorate of Saxony
- Occupation: Dominican preacher
- Known for: Selling indulgences

Johann Tetzel (c. 1465 – 11 August 1519) was a German Dominican friar and preacher. He was appointed Inquisitor for Poland and Saxony, later becoming the Grand Commissioner for indulgences in Germany. Tetzel was known for granting indulgences on behalf of the Catholic Church in exchange for tithes to the Church. Indulgences grant a degree of expiation of the punishments of purgatory due to sin. However, the misuse of indulgences within the Church largely contributed to Martin Luther writing his Ninety-five Theses, which would lead to the formation of the Lutheran branch of Protestantism. The main usage of the indulgences by Tetzel was to help fund and build the new St. Peter's Basilica in Rome.

== Life ==
Tetzel was born in Pirna, Saxony, and studied theology and philosophy at Leipzig University. He entered the Dominican order in 1489, became a famous preacher, and was in 1502 commissioned by Cardinal Giovanni de' Medici, later Pope Leo X, to preach the Jubilee indulgence, which he did throughout his life. In 1509 he was made an inquisitor of Poland and in January 1517 was made commissioner of indulgences for Archbishop Albrecht von Brandenburg in the dioceses of Magdeburg and Halberstadt.

He acquired the degree of Licentiate of Sacred Theology in the University of Frankfurt an der Oder in 1517, and then of Doctor of Sacred Theology in 1518, by defending in two disputations the doctrine of indulgences against Martin Luther. The accusation that he had sold full forgiveness for sins not yet committed caused a great scandal. It was believed that all of the money that Tetzel raised was for the ongoing reconstruction of St. Peter's Basilica, although half the money went to the Archbishop of Mainz, Cardinal Albert of Brandenburg (under whose authority Tetzel was operating), to pay off the debts incurred in securing Albert's appointment to the archbishopric. Tetzel made much of his money by selling his indulgences throughout Leipzig. The way that he persuaded many people to buy his indulgences was offering access directly to heaven even for people who were already dead and in purgatory. He was highly effective at this persuasion, and as such was able to sell many indulgences. In some cases, his planned arrival in a town would be announced weeks in advance. Luther did not agree with Tetzel's practices and began to preach openly against him. He was inspired to write his famous Ninety-five Theses in part due to Tetzel's actions. In the theses, he states,

27. They preach only human doctrines who say that as soon as the money clinks into the money chest, the soul flies out of purgatory.
28. It is certain that when money clinks in the money chest, greed and avarice can be increased; but when the church intercedes, the result is in the hands of God alone.

Tetzel was also accused, but exonerated, of immorality. When Karl von Miltitz accused him of perpetrating frauds and embezzlements, he withdrew to the Dominican monastery in Leipzig where, worn out by the controversies surrounding him, he died in 1519. Miltitz was later discredited to the point that his claims carry no historical weight.

When Luther heard that Tetzel was mortally ill and on his deathbed, he wrote to comfort him and bade him "not to be troubled, for the matter did not begin on his account, but the child had quite a different father." After his death, Tetzel was given an honorable burial and interred before the high altar of the Dominican Church in Leipzig.

== Doctrinal positions ==
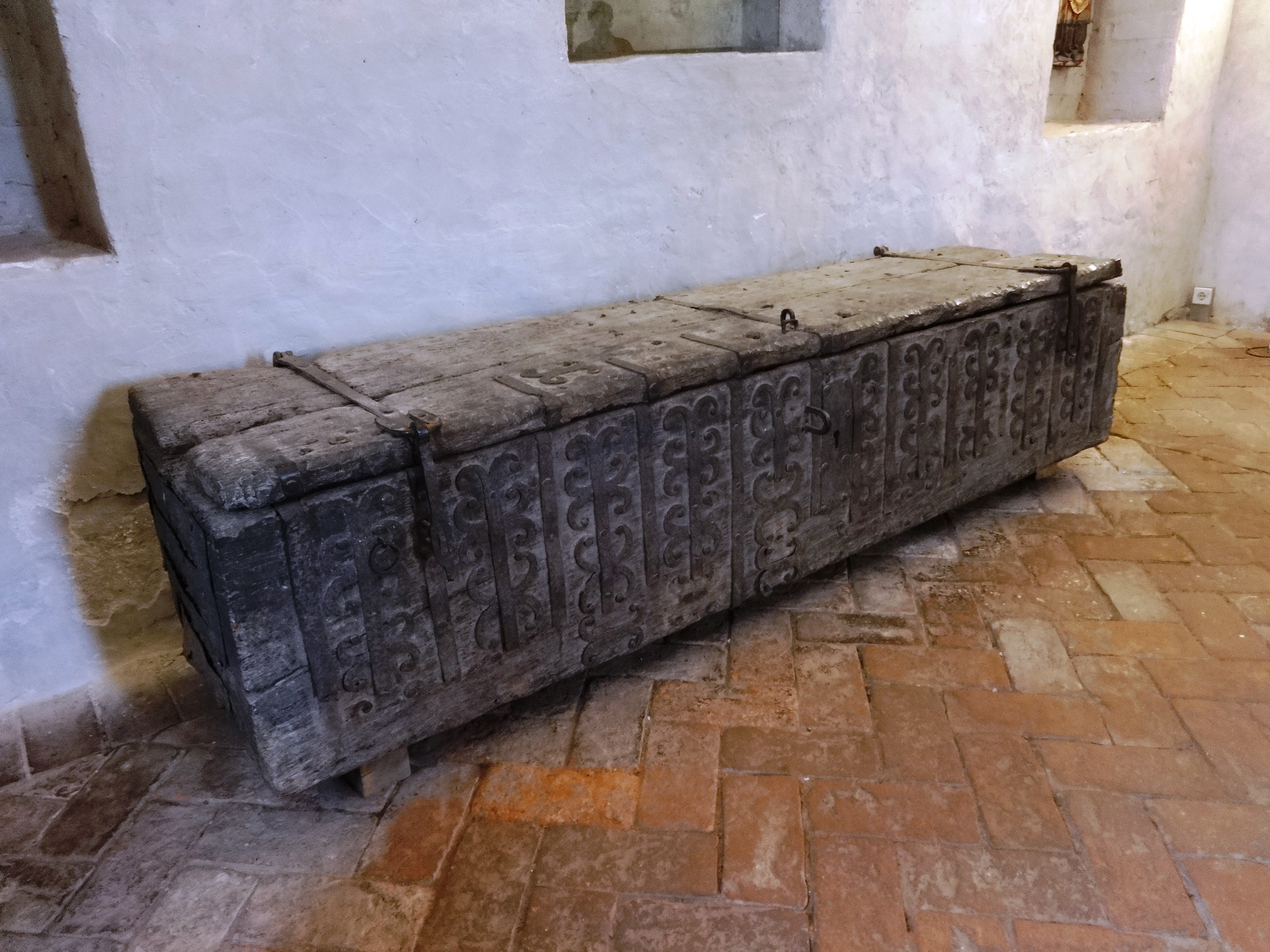
Tetzel's coffer, on display at the St. Nikolai church in Jüterbog

Tetzel incorrectly stated Catholic doctrine in regard to indulgences for the dead. He became known for a couplet attributed to him (although almost certainly not a literal quotation):

As soon as the gold in the casket rings
The rescued soul to heaven springs (Note: Another version of this quote is "as soon as the coin in the coffer rings, a soul from purgatory to heaven springs")

This oft-quoted saying was by no means representative of the official Catholic teaching on indulgences, but rather, more a reflection of Tetzel's capacity to exaggerate. Yet if Tetzel overstated the matter in regard to indulgences for the dead, his teaching on indulgences for the living was pure Catholic teaching. The German Catholic historian Ludwig von Pastor explains:

Above all, a most clear distinction must be made between indulgences for the living and those for the dead.
As regards indulgences for the living, Tetzel always taught pure (Catholic) doctrine. The assertion that he put forward indulgences as being not only a remission of the temporal punishment of sin but as a remission of its guilt, is as unfounded as is that other accusation against him, that he sold the forgiveness of sin for money, without even any mention of contrition and confession, or that, for payment, he absolved from sins which might be committed in the future. His teaching was, in fact, very definite, and quite in harmony with the theology of the (Catholic) Church, as it was then and as it is now, i.e., that indulgences "apply only to the temporal punishment due to sins which have been already repented of and confessed"...

The case was very different from indulgences for the dead. As regards these there is no doubt that Tetzel did, according to what he considered his authoritative instructions, proclaim as Christian doctrine that nothing but an offering of money was required to gain the indulgence for the dead, without there being any question of contrition or confession. He also taught, in accordance with the opinion then held, that an indulgence could be applied to any given soul with unfailing effect. Starting from this assumption, there is no doubt that his doctrine was virtually that of the well known drastic proverb.

The Papal Bull of indulgence gave no sanction whatever to this proposition. It was a vague scholastic opinion, rejected by the Sorbonne in 1482, and again in 1518, and certainly not a doctrine of the Church, which was thus improperly put forward as dogmatic truth. The first among the theologians of the Roman court, Cardinal Cajetan, was the enemy of all such extravagances and declared emphatically that, even if theologians and preachers taught such opinions, no faith need be given them. "Preachers", he said, "speak in the name of the Church only so long as they proclaim the doctrine of Christ and His Church; but if, for purposes of their own, they teach that about which they know nothing, and which is only their own imagination, they must not be accepted as mouthpieces of the Church. No one must be surprised if such as these fall into error."

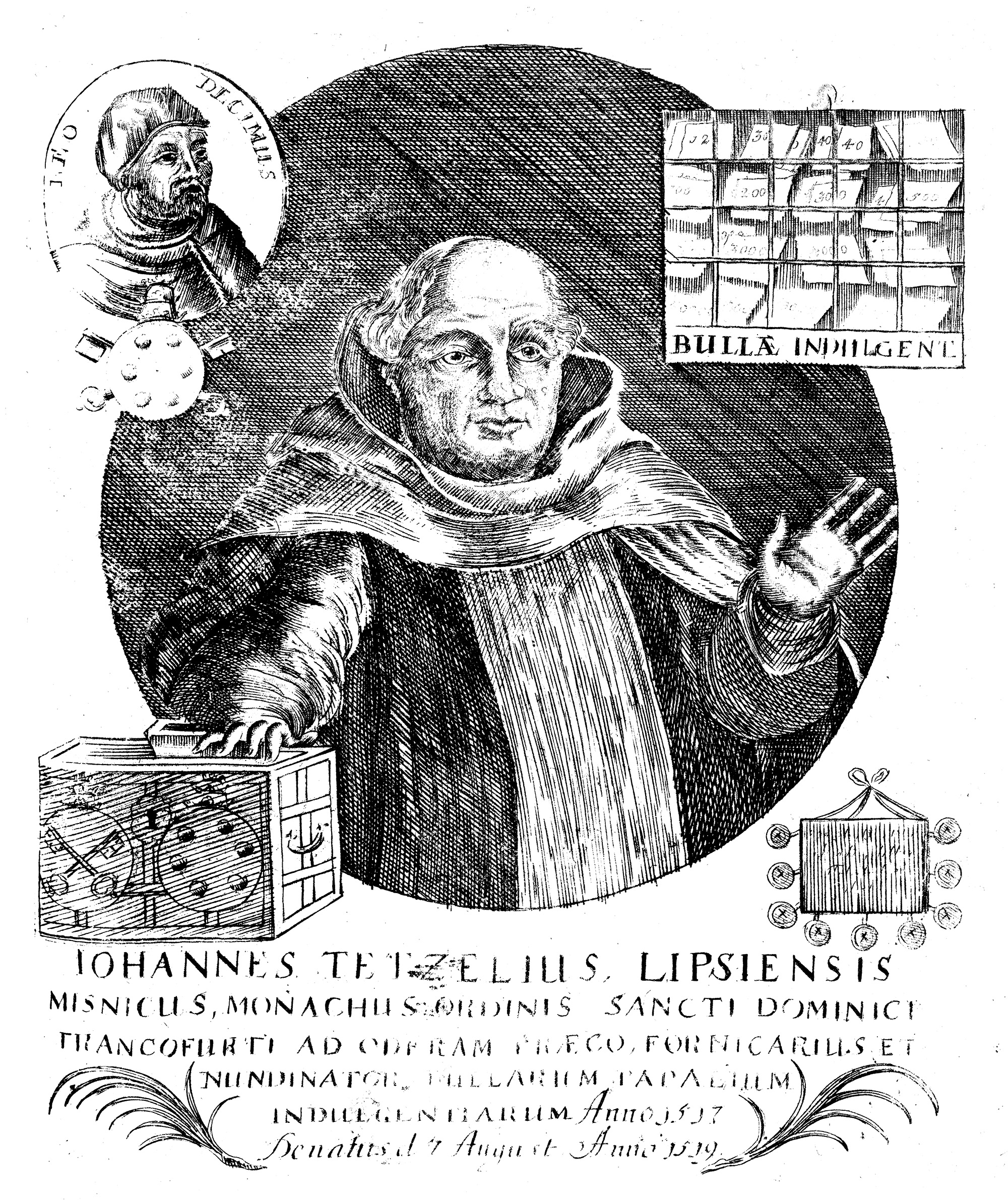
Johann Tetzel Taking an Oath (1717)

== Alleged beating by nobleman ==
Luther claimed Tetzel had received a substantial amount of money at Leipzig from a nobleman, who asked him for a letter of indulgence for a future sin he would commit. Supposedly Tetzel answered in the affirmative, insisting that the payment had to be made at once. The nobleman did so and received a letter and seal from Tetzel. However, when Tetzel left Leipzig, the nobleman attacked him along the way and gave him a thorough beating, sending him back empty-handed to Leipzig, saying that was the future sin which he had in mind. George, Duke of Saxony at first was quite furious about the incident, but when he heard the whole story, he let it go without punishing the nobleman.

== In popular culture ==
Tetzel has been portrayed on stage and screen by the following:

- Jakob Tiedtke in the 1928 German film Luther.
- Alexander Gauge in the 1953 film Martin Luther.
- In John Osborne's 1961 play Luther, Tetzel was played by Peter Bull in the original London and Broadway productions, Hugh Griffith in the 1973 film of the play, and Richard Griffiths in a 2001 National Theatre revival.
- Clive Swift in the 1983 film Martin Luther, Heretic.
- Alfred Molina in the 2003 film Luther.
