= St. Nikolai church (Jüterbog) =

Church in Jüterbog, Germany

Coordinates: 51°59′28″N 13°05′05″E

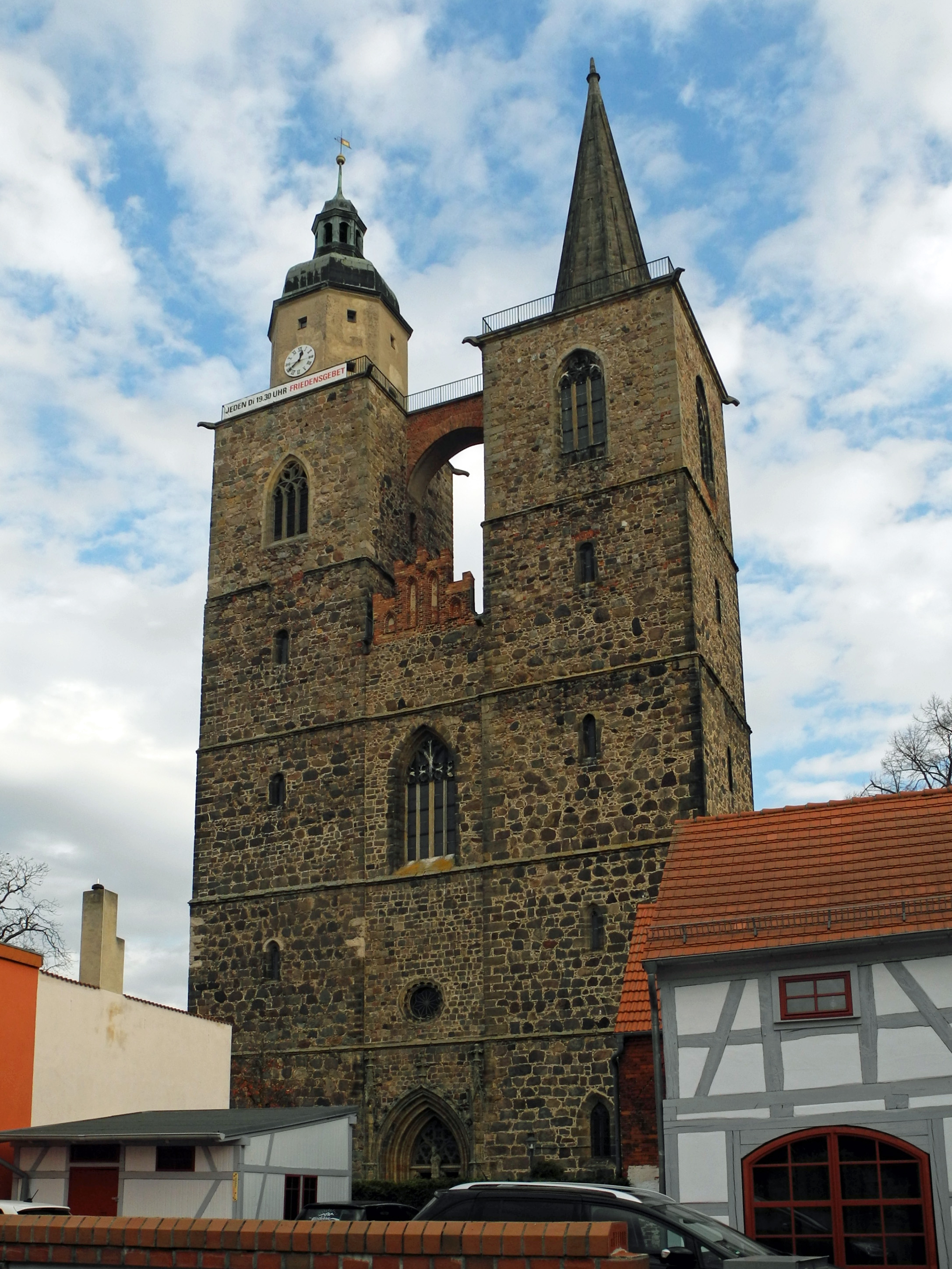
Front view with dual towers

The St. Nikolai church is the largest medieval church in Jüterbog, Brandenburg, Germany. The nave is a Brick Gothic hall church construction with field stone dual towers that dominate the cityscape. The church was first mentioned in 1307 and likely consecrated in 1488. The Patron saint is St. Nicholas of Myra.

The church contains a rare surviving indulgences coffer by Dominican friar Johann Tetzel, which were used to finance the construction of St. Peter's Basilica in Rome. These practices were observed by Martin Luther in nearby Wittenberg, as his parishioners went to Jüterbog to buy the latest indulgence letters. In response, Luther published his famous 95 Theses in 1517, which began the Protestant Reformation.

== Building ==
St. Nikolai church was first mentioned in 1307. The Brick Gothic hall church was constructed in three phases beginning with the nave. The northern and southern extensions were added to the nave in the early 15th century. The consecration of the church is believed to be in 1488 based on an inscription in the nave. Work on the towers was not completed until after 1500 and the final northern metal canopy was completed in 1617.

The church is 71 meters long and 23 meters wide making it the largest in the region around Jüterbog. The nave is three-aisled with five bays and a choir. The building is made of three different materials. The nave is predominantly made of red brick with some field stone patches. The vault ribs inside are made of sandstone. The nave is supported by attached buttresses on the outside and has a southern and a northern extension construction. St. Nikolai's overall construction resembles the Church of St. Mary in nearby Wittenberg.

The two towers have five floors and are made of field stone with some more refined elements of sandstone. The upper floor is taller has larger windows. A platform connects both towers over an arched bridge. The northern tower spire is an octagon with a canopy and lantern in a Renaissance style and the southern tower spire has the shape of a pointed helmet. The main Gothic portal between the towers is carved from sandstone and holds a near life size statue of Saint Nicholas, the patron saint of the church. Above the portal is a small Gothic rose window.

The interior is characterized by lively decorations with a pulpit and arches that are both colorfully patterned. The church contains several stone epitaphs for local clergymen and dukes. The elevated high altar contains elaborate carvings with floral motifs and several colored putti. A central painting of Christ in the Jerusalem temple is flanked by two columns on each side. The top contains a triangle with the Hebrew spelling of the Tetragrammaton inside symbolizing the Christian trinity. The main church organ was built in 1909. The smaller positive organ from 1657 with five voices is the oldest surviving organ in the state of Brandenburg. The retable in the chapel contains a central panel painting showing the lamentation of Christ from about 1515-1520 that is attributed to the workshop of the German Renaissance painter Lucas Cranach the Elder.

A soldier memorial is situated south of the main church building. It contains an elevated stone sarcophagus surrounded by a circle of columns with brick arches.

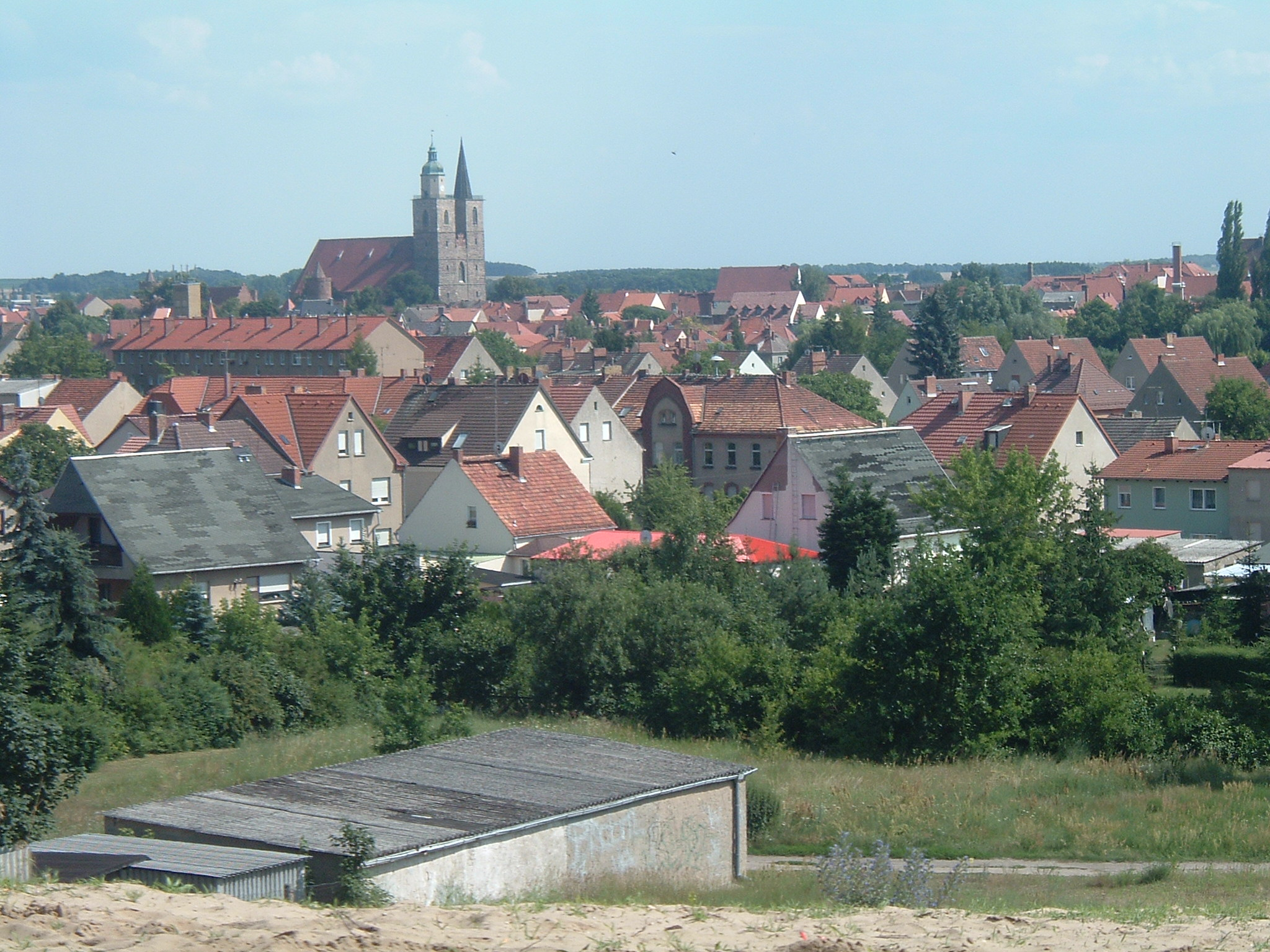
St. Nikolai in Jüterbog

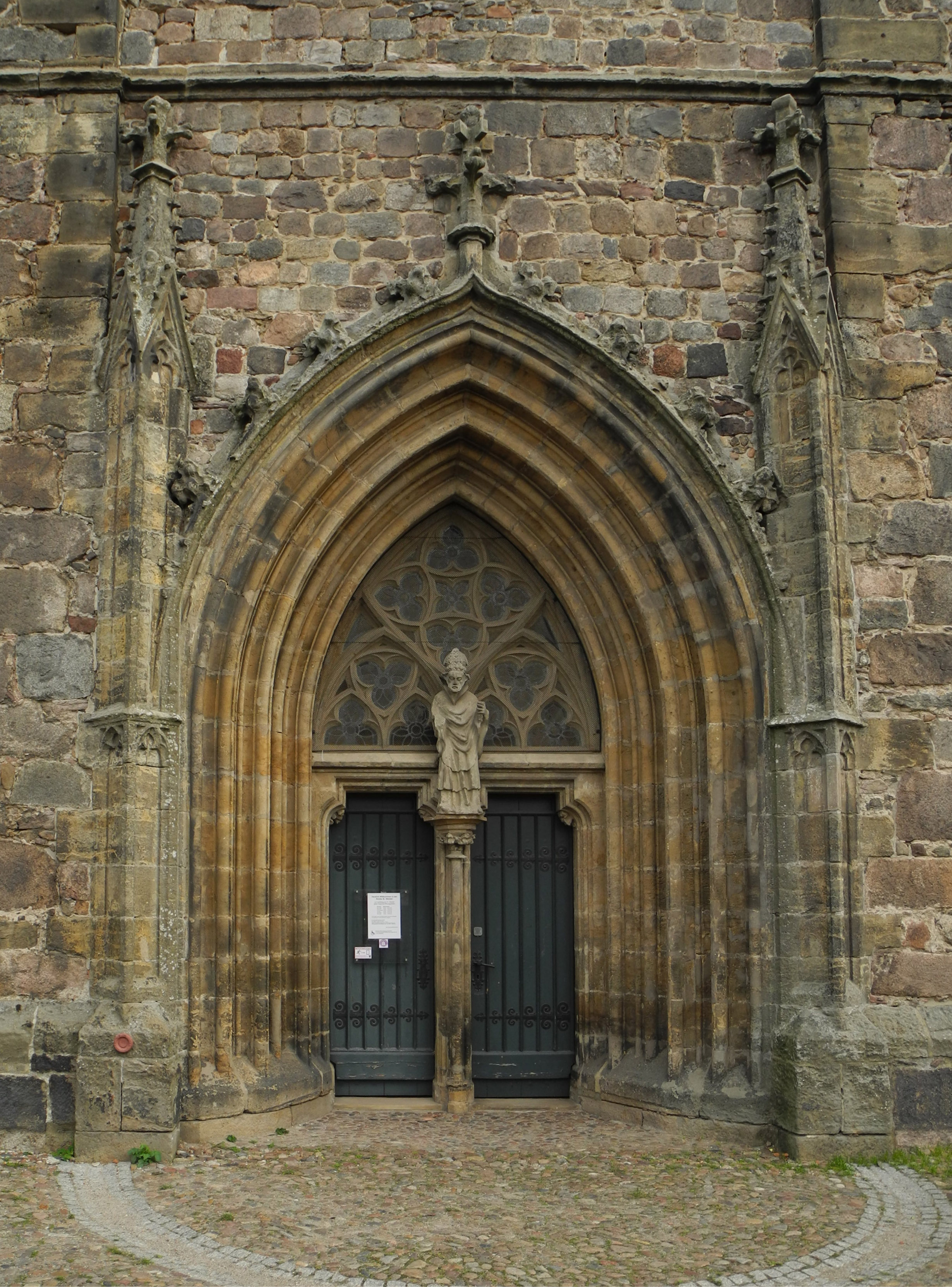
Gothic portal with St. Nikolai statue

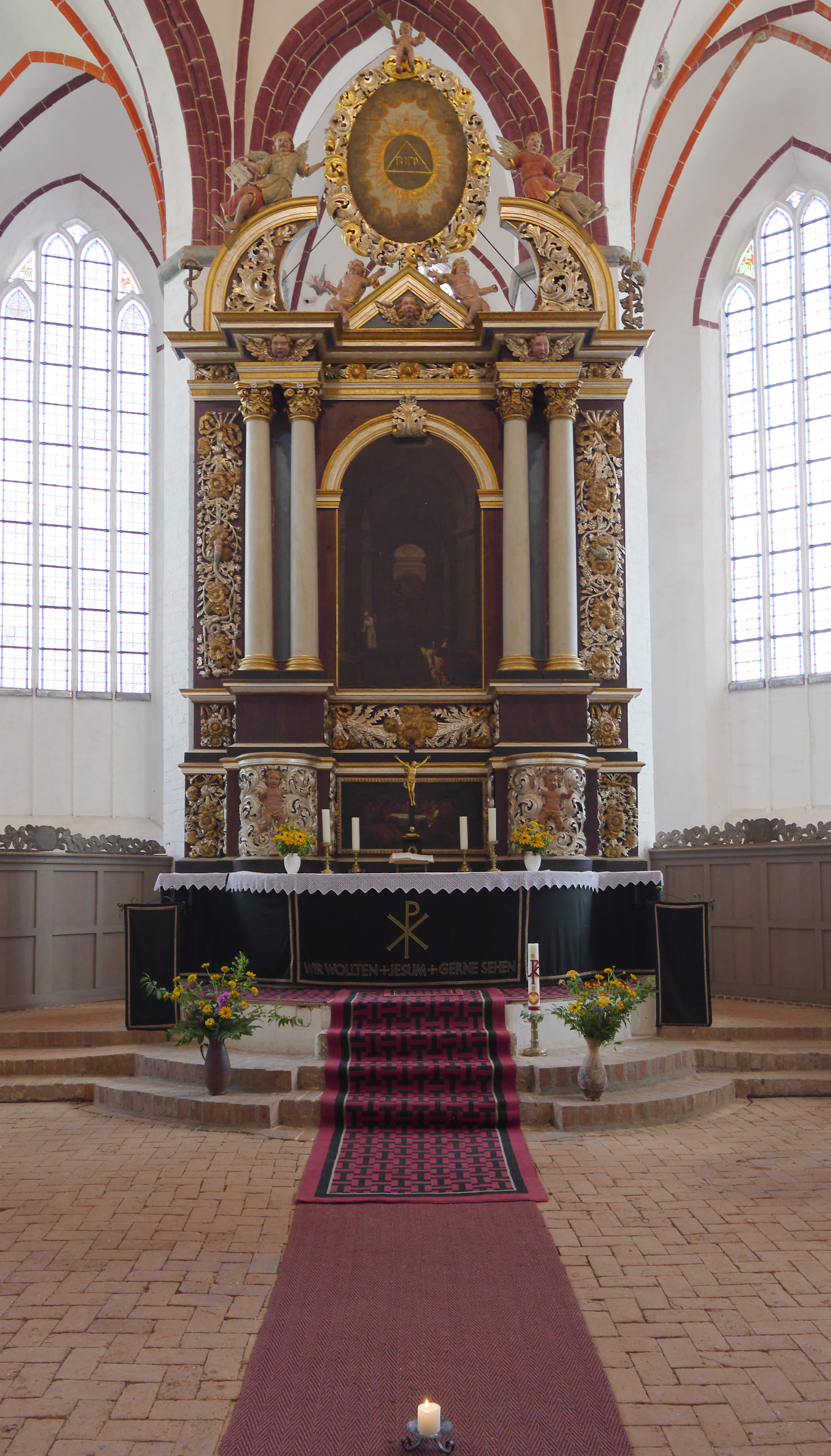
High altar

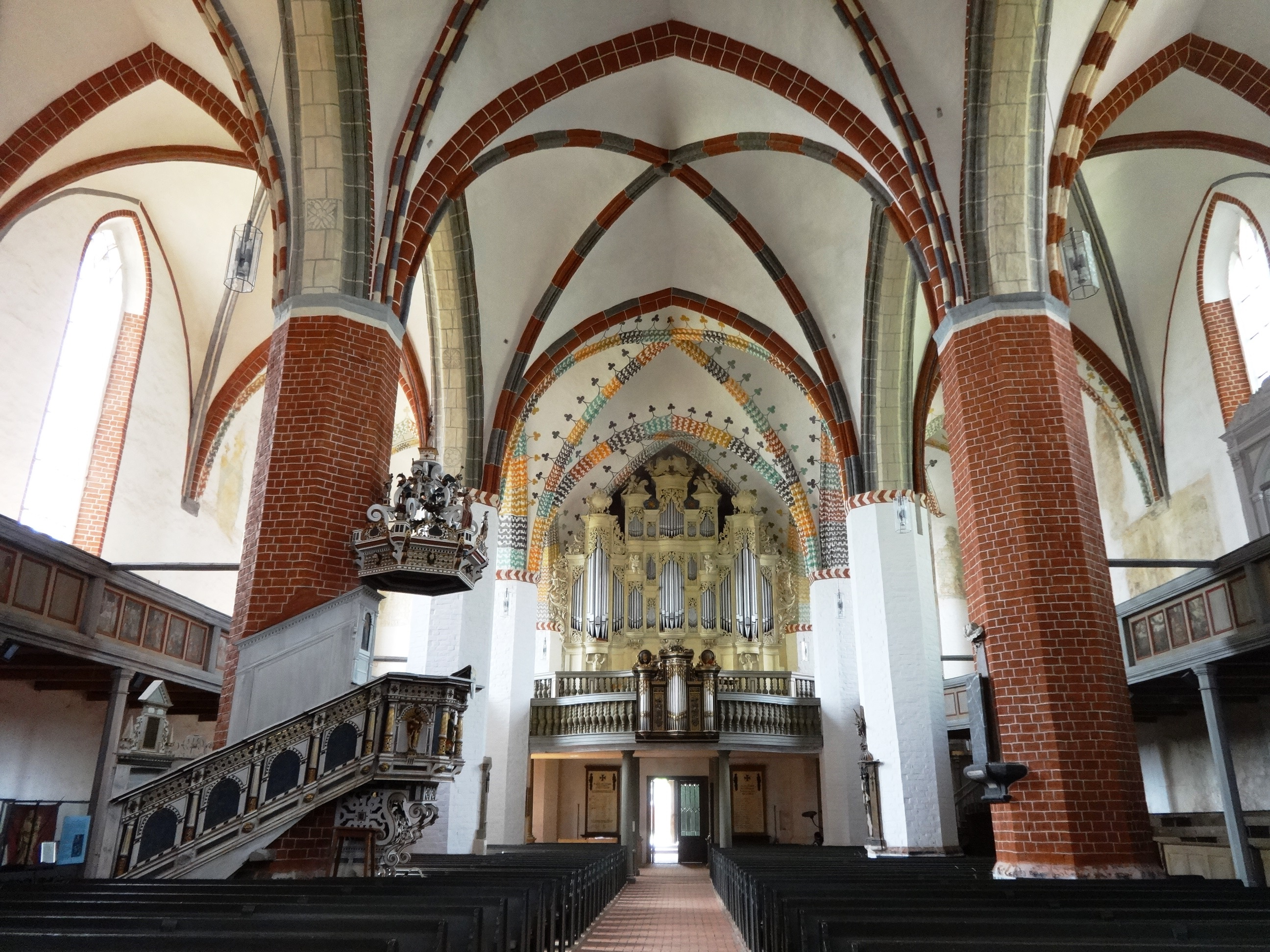
Hall church with pulpit and main organ

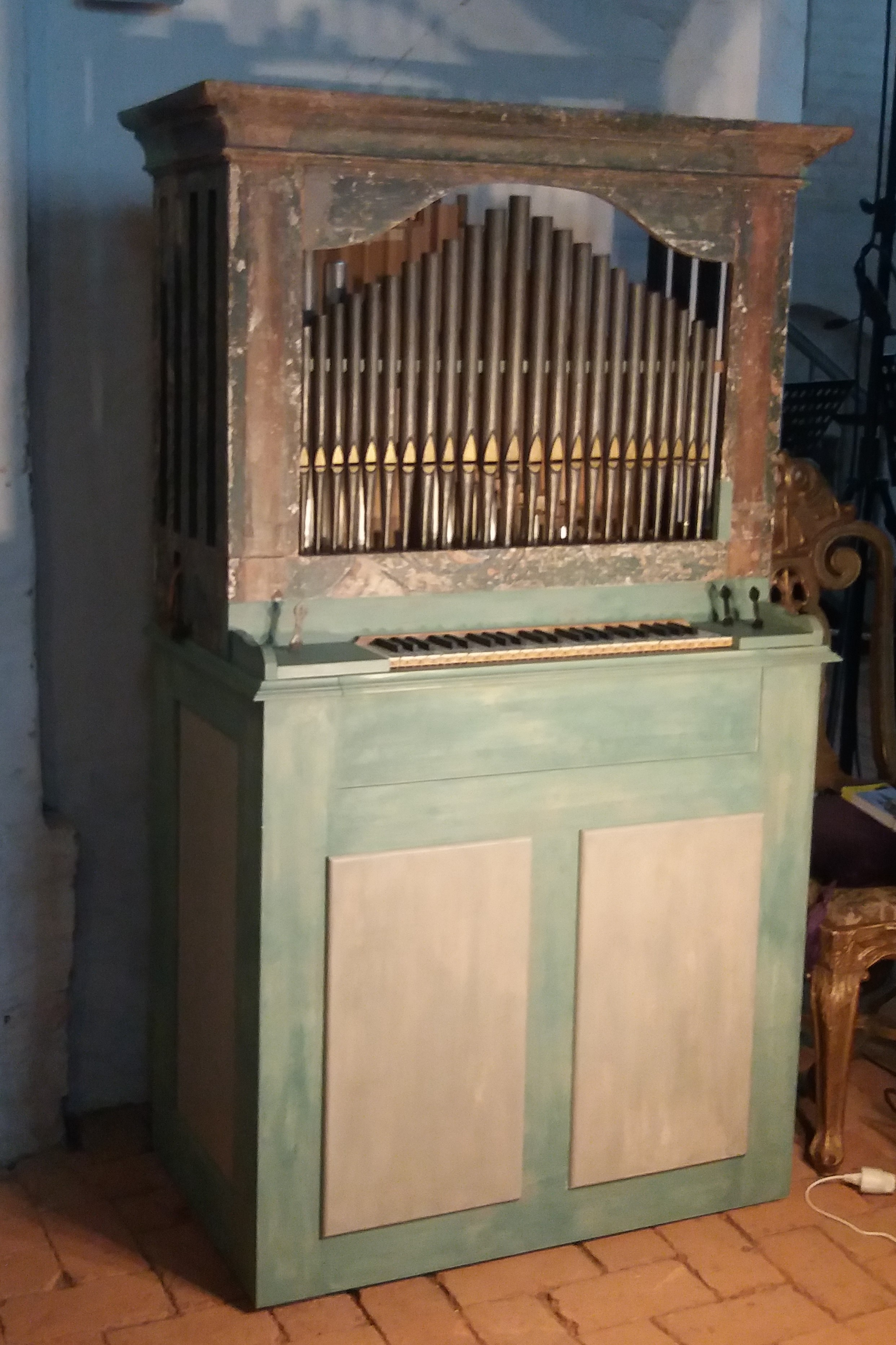
Positive organ from 1657

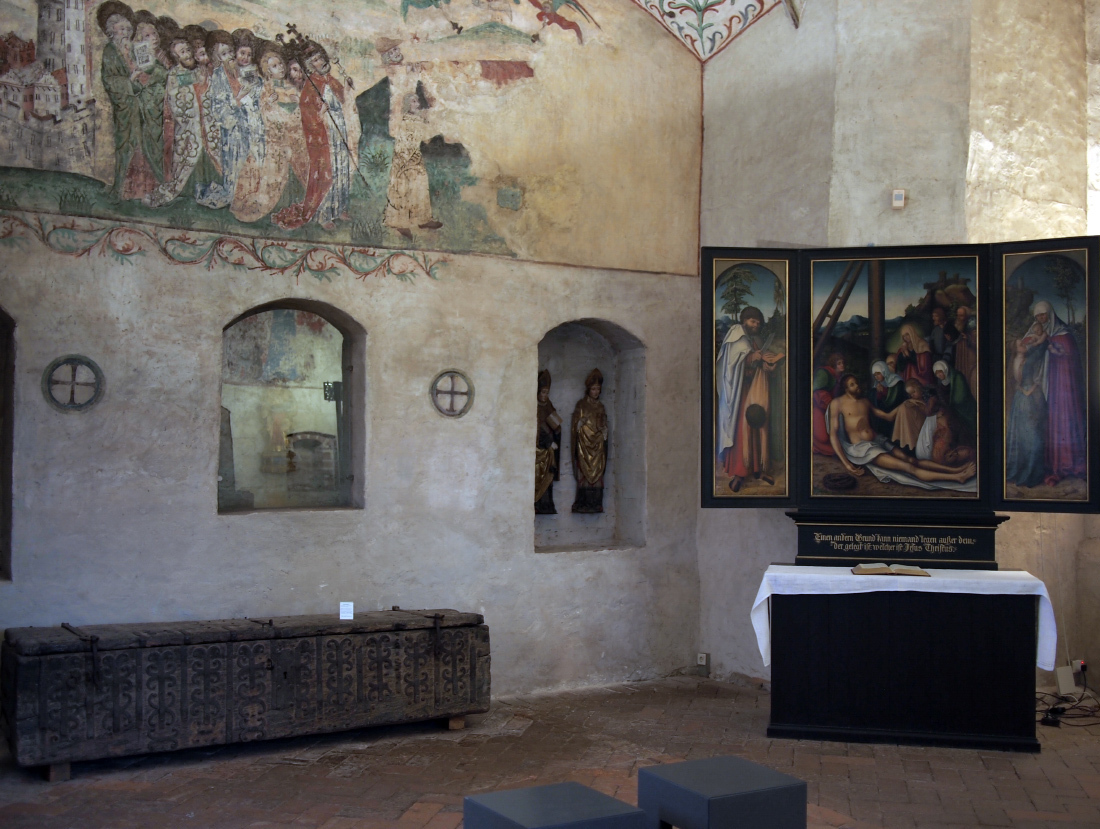
Chapel with indulgences coffer and retable

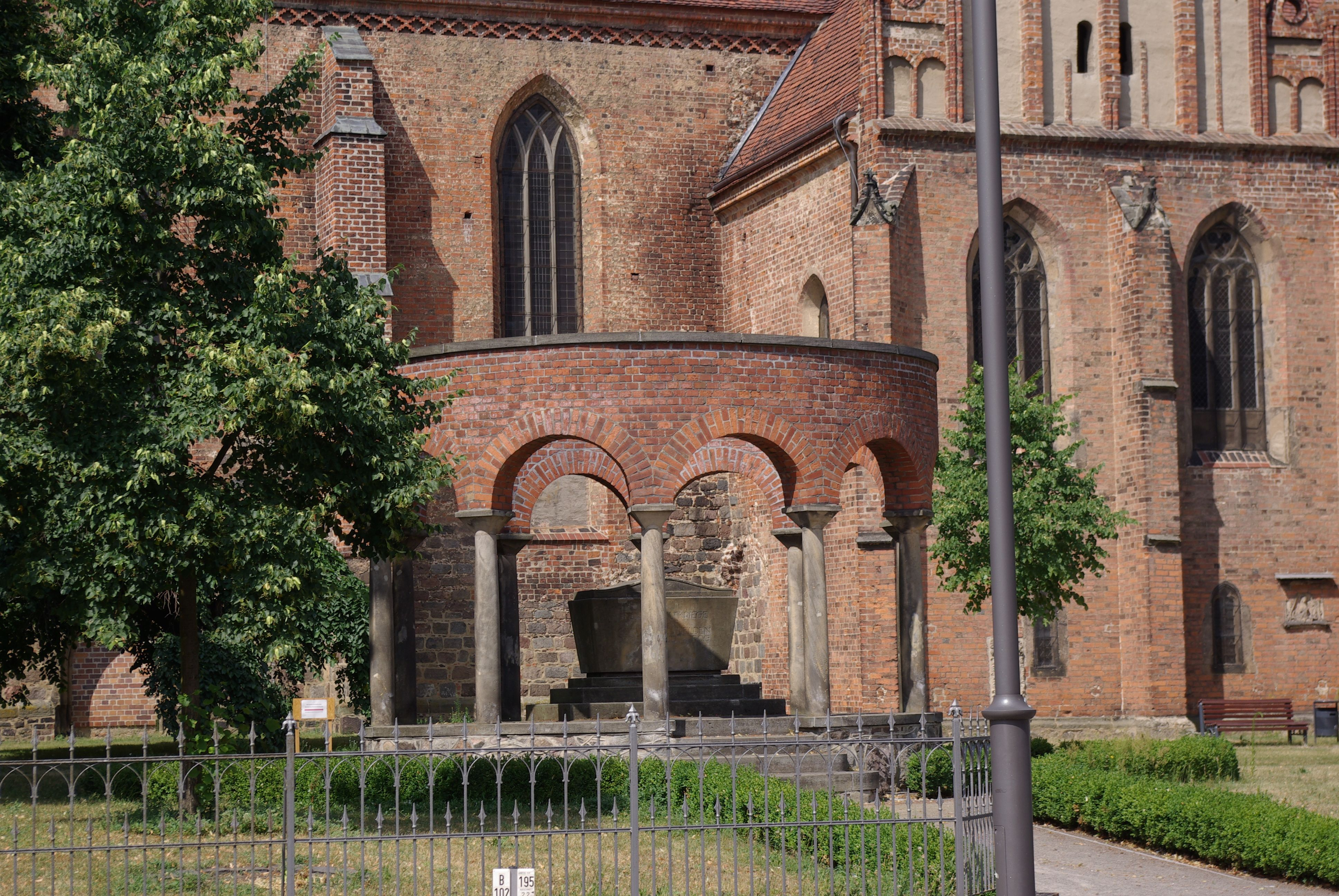
Soldier memorial to the south

== Indulgences in Jüterbog ==
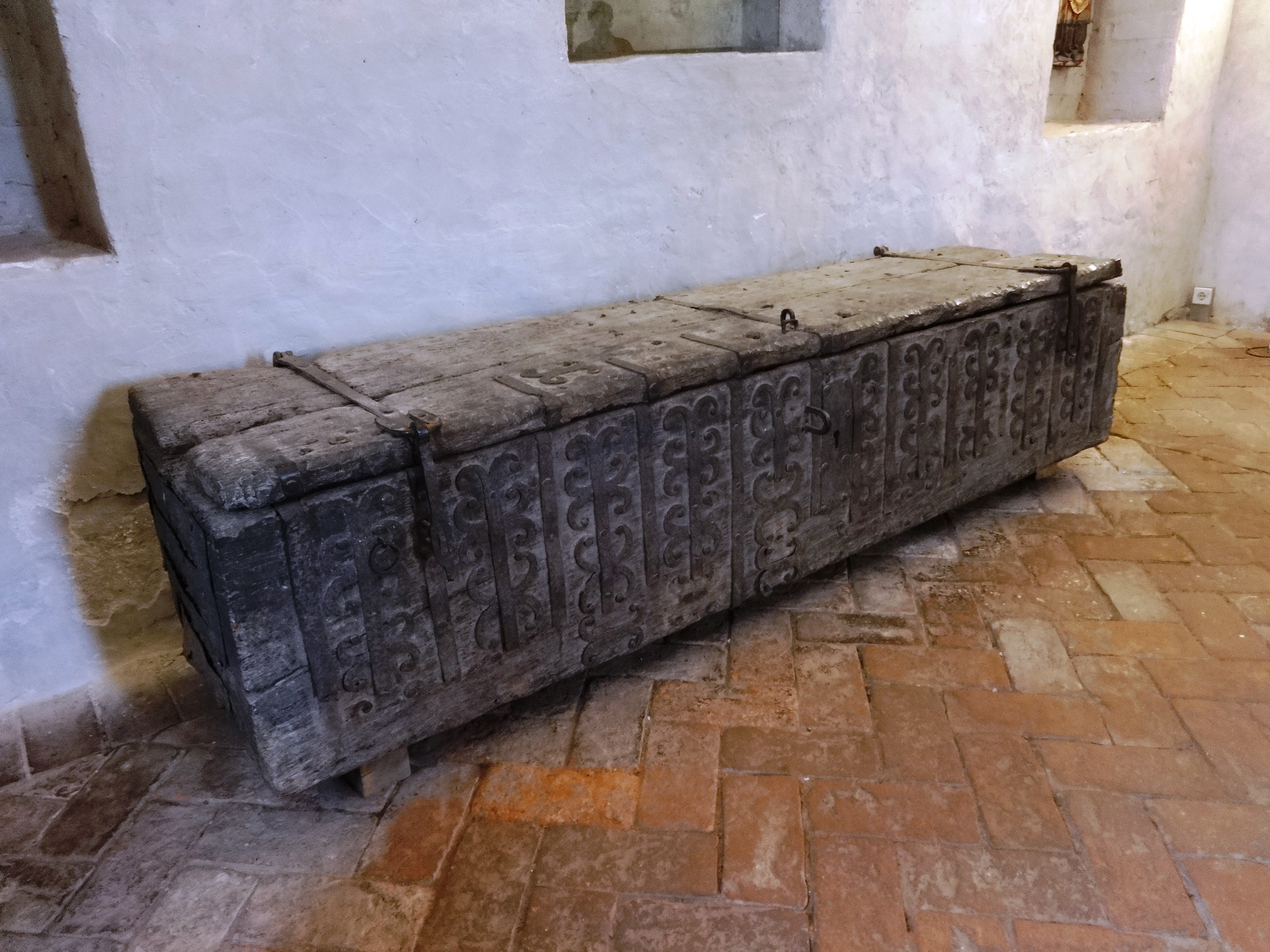
Johann Tetzel's indulgences coffer

A small chapel contains a rare surviving indulgences coffer by Dominican friar Johann Tetzel. Archbishop Albert of Brandenburg had appointed Tetzel to collect indulgences which were used to finance the construction of St. Peter's Basilica in Rome. Martin Luther said in his table talks that Tetzel offered his letters of indulgence in Jüterbog because he was not allowed to cross the border to nearby Wittenberg. When more and more of Luther's parishioners went to Jüterbog to buy the latest indulgence letters, he published his famous 95 Theses in 1517, which began the Protestant Reformation.

A local folklore story told by German writer Theodor Fontane in his five-volume travelogue Wanderungen durch die Mark Brandenburg (1862–1889) reported that the coffer was robbed from Tetzel by the local knight Hans von Hake, who had previously bought an indulgence letter for his future sins.

German preacher and radical Protestant theologian Thomas Müntzer was a visiting preacher in St. Nikolai during Easter (1519). His radical ideas conflicted with both the Catholic church and Martin Luther. Müntzer participated in the German Peasants' War from 1524 and was executed after being captured. A memorial stone plaque commemorates his preaching in St. Nikolai.

== Literature ==
- Georg Dehio (2012): Handbuch der deutschen Kunstdenkmäler, Brandenburg. 2. edition. pp. 507. Deutscher Kunstverlag, München. ISBN 978-3-422-03123-4
- Marie-Luise Buchinger, Marcus Cante (2000): Denkmale in Brandenburg. Band 17.1. Landkreis Teltow-Fläming. Stadt Jüterbog mit Kloster Zinna und Gemeinde Niedergörsdorf. pp. 65–86. Wernersche Verlagsgesellschaft, Worms. ISBN 3-88462-154-8. Chapter text online (shortened)
- Landesregierung Brandenburg (publisher) (1992): Baukunst in Brandenburg. DuMont Buchverlag, Köln. ISBN 3-7701-3021-9
