= John Nettleton (actor) =

British actor (1929–2023)

- Born: 5 February 1929; Sydenham, London, England
- Died: 12 July 2023 (aged 94)
- Occupation: Actor
- Years active: 1956–2010
- Spouse: Deirdre Doone (m. 1954)
- Children: 3

John Slade Nettleton (5 February 1929 – 12 July 2023) was an English actor. He played Sir Arnold Robinson, Cabinet Secretary in Yes Minister (1980–1984) and President of the Campaign for Freedom of Information in the follow-up Yes, Prime Minister (1985–1988). Another political role for Nettleton was as Conservative Party MP Sir Stephen Baxter in the sitcom The New Statesman.

== Early life ==
Nettleton was born in Sydenham, London, and graduated from RADA in 1951.

== Career ==
Nettleton played Sir Arnold Robinson, Cabinet Secretary in Yes Minister (1980–1984) and President of the Campaign for Freedom of Information in the follow-up Yes, Prime Minister (1985–1988). He also played a Conservative Party Member of Parliament (Sir Stephen Baxter) in the sitcom The New Statesman.

Nettleton's other television roles included a Ministry of Defence department chief in The Avengers (episode "The See-Through Man", 1967), a police sergeant in Please Sir! (1969), Alfred Booker in The Champions (episode "Full Circle", 1969), Froggett in the office comedy series If It Moves File It (1970), Francis Bacon in Elizabeth R (1971), a Detective Superintendent in Doctor at Large in 1971, George Pattinson in a now lost episode ("The Uninvited") of Out of the Unknown (also in 1971), as Arthur Bellamy, brother to Viscount Bellamy, in Upstairs, Downstairs (1972), The Country Wife (1977), Brideshead Revisited (1981), The Flame Trees of Thika (1981), The Citadel (1983), Martin Luther, Heretic (1983), Brass (1983), East of Ipswich (1987), Major Membury in A Perfect Spy (1987), Reverend Ernest Matthews in the Doctor Who serial Ghost Light (1989), Longitude (2000), Midsomer Murders (2005) and Kingdom (2008). In the 1960s and 1970s, Nettleton was the reader of various illustrated stories on children's television programme Blue Peter. Often these were about historical figures, such as Florence Nightingale.

On stage, Nettleton appeared in the Lyttelton Theatre at the Royal National Theatre in the 2006 productions of Harley Granville-Barker's The Voysey Inheritance, directed by Peter Gill. He also appeared at the Olivier Theatre in the 1990 production of Alan Bennett's Wind in the Willows, directed by Nicholas Hytner. He also voiced Grandpa in the PC video game The Scruffs.

== Personal life and death ==
Nettleton married actress Deirdre Doone in 1954. They had three daughters. Nettleton and Doone were members of the Campaign for Nuclear Disarmament. He died on 12 July 2023, aged 94.

== Filmography ==
Year	Title	Role	Notes
1966	A Man for All Seasons	Jailer	
1969	The Last Shot You Hear	Det. Inspector Nash	
1970	Some Will, Some Won't	Wagstaff	
1970	And Soon the Darkness	Gendarme	
1971	Black Beauty	Sir William	
1975	All Creatures Great and Small	Head Waiter	
1982	Anyone for Denis?	Jenkins	
1983	Martin Luther, Heretic	Andreas Karlstadt	Television film
1988	Burning Secret	Doctor Weiss	
1991	American Friends	Rev. Groves	
1998	Jinnah	General Gracie	
2005	Oliver Twist	1st Magistrate	
2007	Fishtales	Professor Coulter	
