= Thümmlitzwalde =

- Stadtteil of Grimma
- Coat of arms
- Interactive map of Thümmlitzwalde
- Location within Germany Location within Saxony
- Coordinates: 51°10′N 12°55′E
- Country: Germany
- State: Saxony
- District: Leipzig
- Town: Grimma

Area
  - Total: 55.88 km^{2} (21.58 sq mi)
- Elevation: 173 m (568 ft)

Population (2009-12-31)
  - Total: 3,216
  - Density: 57.55/km^{2} (149.1/sq mi)
- Time zone: UTC+01:00 (CET)
  - Summer (DST): UTC+02:00 (CEST)
- Postal codes: 04668
- Dialling codes: 034386
- Vehicle registration: L
- Website: www.gemeinde-thuemmlitzwal.de

Thümmlitzwalde is a village and a former municipality in the Leipzig district in Saxony, Germany. Since 1 January 2011, it is part of the town Grimma.
