= Karl von Miltitz =

Papal nuncio (c.1490–1529)

Karl von Miltitz (c. 1490 – 20 November 1529) was a papal nuncio and a Mainz Cathedral canon.

== Biography ==
He was born in Rabenau near Meißen and Dresden, his family stemming from the lesser Saxon nobility. He studied at Mainz, Trier, Cologne (1508–1510), and Bologna (1510–?), but his deficient Latin reveals that he was not especially learned. He went to the Roman curia in 1513 or 1514. In his career at the papal court he was unable to rise further than papal chamberlain and secretary.

His Saxon heritage, however, made him a natural liaison between the papal court and Elector Frederick the Wise. On 3 September 1518 Pope Leo X decided to bestow on Frederick the papal Golden Rose of Virtue — an award with attendant religious privileges to deserving princes, with the aim of securing the support of Frederick the Wise in suppressing the attacks of Martin Luther on indulgences in the Church.

On 15 October 1518 Miltitz was appointed nuncio to deliver the rose to the elector. He met with Luther in Altenburg on 5–6 January 1519, and negotiated a tentative settlement to the controversy: Luther would remain silent on the indulgence issue, write a conciliatory letter to the Pope and write and publish a tract supporting papal authority. Luther's silence was contingent on the silence of his opponents; Johann Tetzel and Albert of Mainz would be disciplined, and Luther was allowed by Miltitz to make it plain that he would not recant his position.

Miltitz's later meetings with Luther in Liebenwerda (October 1519) and in Lichtenburg, near Wittenberg (October 1520) were fruitless. With his statements at the Leipzig Debate in 1519 and the three treatises To the Christian Nobility of the German Nation, On the Babylonian Captivity of the Church and On the Freedom of a Christian, all published in 1520, Luther destroyed all hope of reconciliation.

Miltitz investigated the conduct of Tetzel and accused him of perpetrating numerous frauds and embezzlements. Miltitz was later discredited to the point where his claims carry no historical weight.

From 1523 until his death in 1529 Miltitz lived in Mainz and Meißen as a canon of the Mainz Cathedral. He accidentally drowned in the Main River near Groß-Steinheim on 20 November 1529 and was buried in Mainz Cathedral.

== Bibliography ==
- Creutzberg, (Freiburg, 1907)
- Herbermann, Charles, ed. (1913). "Karl von Miltiz" . Catholic Encyclopedia. New York: Robert Appleton Company.
- Gilman, D. C.; Peck, H. T.; Colby, F. M., eds. (1905). "Miltitz, Karl von" . New International Encyclopedia (1st ed.). New York: Dodd, Mead.
