= Johann von Staupitz =

Catholic theologian (1460–1524)

The Reverend Johann von Staupitz OSA
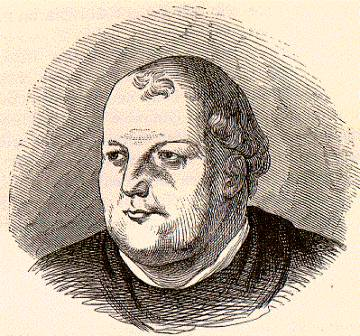
- Engraving of Johann von Staupitz, 1889
- Born: c. 1460; Motterwitz, Electorate of Saxony
- Died: December 28, 1524 (aged 63–64); St Peter's Archabbey, Salzburg, Archbishopric of Salzburg

Ecclesiastical career
- Religion: Roman Catholic

Johann von Staupitz OSA (c. 1460 – 28 December 1524) was a German Catholic priest and theologian, university preacher, and Vicar General of the Augustinian friars in Germany, who supervised Martin Luther during a critical period in his spiritual life. Martin Luther himself remarked, "If it had not been for Dr. Staupitz, I should have sunk in hell." Although he remained Catholic, died as a Benedictine monk and had repudiated the Reformation, he is commemorated on 8 November as a priest in the Calendar of Saints of the Lutheran Church–Missouri Synod.

== Biography ==
Johann von Staupitz was born in Motterwitz around 1460. Descended from an old Saxon family of Czech origin (ze Stupic), he matriculated in the year 1485 and was accepted into the Augustinian order of friars in Munich before being posted to Tübingen, where he was eventually promoted to the rank of prior. In 1500, Staupitz was made a Doctor of Theology and in 1503 he was elected to the post of Vicar General of the "Saxon Reformed Congregation" of the Augustinian friars, which took in greater Germany. He was also made dean of the theology faculty at the new University of Wittenberg when it was founded in 1502. In 1512, while in his fifties, Staupitz resigned his professorship and relocated to the southern part of Germany, resigning his vicar-generalship officially in 1520. In 1522 he accepted an offer from the Benedictines inviting him to join their order, becoming Abbot of St Peter's in Salzburg.

As Augustinian Superior, Staupitz first met Martin Luther at Erfurt in April 1506. A young friar plagued by persistent thoughts of spiritual inadequacy, Luther felt compelled to confess to Staupitz everything sinful he had ever done. At least once, Luther spent six hours confessing to Staupitz, who responded to the young man's doubts by counselling him on the Means of Grace and on salvation through the blood of Christ. He also commanded Luther to pursue a more academic career, hoping it would provide a distraction from his recurrent theological brooding.

In 1518, after Luther was declared a heretic, Staupitz was appointed promagister of the Augustinian order to plead in protest with Luther, discussing the issue of indulgences in great detail. Staupitz perceived Luther's complaints as questions against clerical abuses, rather than as fundamental disputes of dogma. Ultimately, Staupitz released Martin Luther from the Augustinian order, preserving the good name of the order while simultaneously giving Luther freedom to act. His connection with Luther's views was now sealed, and in 1520 Pope Leo X demanded an abjuration and revocation of heresy from Staupitz. He refused to revoke, on the grounds that he had never asserted Luther's heresies himself, but he did abjure and recognize the Pontiff as his judge. Staupitz was no Lutheran, and was thoroughly Catholic in matters of faith, especially as regards the freedom of the will, the meritoriousness of good works, and justification, which has been established by Paulus from the writings of Staupitz. However, Luther perceived his abjuration as a betrayal. In his last letter to Luther in 1524, Staupitz made it clear he was bitter about the direction of the Reformation and its seemingly willful destruction of the unity of the Christian Church.

Staupitz also wrote theological works on the topics of predestination, faith, and love. In 1559, Pope Paul IV added these texts to the Index of Prohibited Books, seeing them as perhaps compromised by the friendly relations between Staupitz and Luther during Luther's earlier years.

Staupitz died in 1524 at St Peter's Archabbey, Salzburg, where he had become a monk in 1522, rising quickly to the post of abbot. He is now celebrated in the Lutheran liturgical calendar.

== See also ==
- Augustinian soteriology
