= Ethnonymic surname =

Surname origination from an ethnonym

Ethnonymic surnames are surnames or bynames that originate from ethnonyms. They may originate from nicknames based on the descent of a person from a given ethnic group. Other reasons could be that a person came to a particular place from the area with different ethnic prevalence, from owing a property in such area, or had a considerable contact with persons or area of other ethnicity. Also, they may reflect the fact that a given person matched a particular ethnic stereotype.

In some research ethnonymic surnames are grouped together with toponymic surnames into "surname by origin", because many ethnonyms may be viewed as demonyms as well; e.g., Litwin is either a person of Lithuanian ethnicity or one from Grand Duchy of Lithuania.

Etnnonymic surnames/nicknames may give rise to patronymic surnames: Arnaudov (from Arnaut, i. e. Albanian), Crnogorčević (from Crnogorac, Montenegrin), Horvatović (from Croat), Grković (from Greek).

== Latvia ==
A number of bynames were derived from the ethnonyms, usually from ethnic minorities, e.g., from "Liv"/"Livonian": Lībietis, Libete, Libes, Lybete, Libeth.... Kursis Curonians, Leitis (Leičiai), Prūsis (Prussians).

Laimute Balode and Laura Grīviņa noted that during the process of Latvianization many surnames relating to ethnonyms were replaced, despite their Lithuanian etymology, due to their perceived negative connotations. These include Krievs ‘Russian’, Žīdiņš < žīds ‘Jew’, Čigāns ‘Roma person’, Svede ‘Swede’. Pusvācietis ‘Half-German’ has the pejorative meaning of ‘a Latvian pretending to be German’.

Balode and Irvina remarked that the 1929 book by Latvian linguist Ernests Blese about the ancient surnames of the 16th century notes that the Latvian word vācietis ("German") was not recorded as a surname, because Germans did not mix with Latvians. However in modern times the Latvian surname Vācietis does exist.

== Lithuania ==
Ethnonymic surnames constitute about 1.2% in Lithuania. Čigonas (Gypsy), Žydas, Vokietis/Vokietys (German), Turkas, Gudas (Belarusian), Lenkas (Pole), Latvis, Maskolius (Muscovite), Rusas, Paliokas (Pole)

Names of ancient Baltic tribes also used as surnames: Aistis (lt:Aisčiai Aesti), Jotvingas (Yatvingians), Notangas (Natangians).

Yulia Gurskaya recorded a considerable number of ethnonymic surnames in historical documents of the Grand Duchy of Lithuania (areas of modern Latgalia/Lithuania/Belarus/Ukraine).

A significant number of ethnonymic surnames originated from the ethnonym "Lithuanian" in various languages.

== Great Britain ==
English surnames, such as Scot/Scott, Welsh/Wallis, Dane, Dutch, or Irish most probably mean that the ancestors of the surname moved to England at some time, and they have these nicknames accordingly.

Brannick is anglicized of Gaelic Breathnach (Breithneach, "Briton Also Fleming, Galbraith, Cornish.

== Hungary ==
There are several dozen names of ethnonymic origin among Hungarian surnames. the constitute about 0.5% of all different Hungarian surnames, however people with these surnames are about 7-8% of the whole population. Three of them, Tóth (Slavic, Slovak, 2.19% of population), Horváth (Croat, 2.01%) and Németh (German, 0.96%) are among the 10 most frequent surnames in 2007. Compared to other European countries, ethnonymic surnames in Hungary constitute a relagively significant category.

Other most frequent ethnonymic surnames are Oláh (Romanian), Rácz (Serb), Török (Turkish), Magyar (Hungarian), Orosz (Russian), Lengyel (Polish), Székely (Sekler), Kun (Cuman), Cseh (Czech), Szász (Saxon), Polák (Polish), Bajor (Bavarian), Olasz (Italian), Tatár (Tatar), Görög (Greek), Rusznyák (Rusyn),Unger (Hungarian), Böhm (Czech), Czigány (Romani), Szlávik (Slavic), Móré (Romanian), Uhrin (Hungarian).

Some Hungarian ethnonymic names may have originated from nicknames associated with the secondary meaning of the term: görög (= Greek, but also merchant), oláh (Romanian, Vlach, also shepherd), orosz (Russian, but also belonging to Eastern Orthodox Church), tatár also used to mean "pagan", bat later acquired the meaning of a violent person.

The ethnicity gave rise to surnames in various European cultures: Mađar/Maďar/Madžar Magyar Ungar Ungaro Ungaretti Unger Ungerman, Ungermann Ungur Ungureanu Vengerov

== Romania ==
Romanian philologist Ioan Bilețchi-Albescu specifically dealt with this subject. He classified the origins of Romanian ethnonymic surnames in four categories: (1) ethnic affiliation, either immediate or distant; (2) place of origin; (3) ethnic stereotypes; (4) sympathies towards a particular ethnicity. He gave an example of the last category: the nickname/surname Cazacul/Cazacu, "Cossack" (7,543 persons with the surname in 2013), may refer to the ethnicity of the person, but may also be given to a Romanian who admired the bravery of Cossacks.

=== South Slavic provenance ===
There was an unusually high number of people with surnames/nicknames Sârbul/Sârbu (Serb) or Sârbescu (descendant of Sârb). It was explained that South Slavs fleeing the Ottoman Empire were indiscriminately called "Serbs" regardless their actual ethnicity. Another surname related to Serbs is Rațiu, which derives from the Hungarian-language term rác ("Rascian", a historical term for Serbs).

In 2013, 14,719 persons had the surname Sârbu, and 1,333 had the surname Bulgaru.

=== Nomadic/itinerant peoples ===
Coman (from Cumans): 579 persons; Tătaru: 3,350; Calmâș (Kalmyk): 664, Calmăș: 1. Nogai (from Nogais): 455; Nohaiu: 1,774.

Also Țiganu (Gypsy), Comănescu (descendant of a person named Cuman).

=== Other ===
Armenians functioned as a "middleman minority" and tradespeople in many places of Europe, as well as in the Ottoman Empire. In particular, in Romanian records of the 18th century there were many Armenians without surname and identified by the ethnicity, e.g., "David, arman, cafegiu (David, Armenian, coffee shop owner)". Eventually there references turned into the Romanian surname Arman/Armanu. In 2013 Romania the surnames Arman had 442 persons, Armanu 367 persons, and more contemporary form Armeanu from armean, Armenian, had 36 persons.

Russians/Rusyns/Ruthenians: Rusu: 23,589; Russu: 7,250; Rus: 86, Russo: 50; Ruso: 3. Other older and rarer surnames include Rusan, Rusoi, Rusuleț. Maria Cosniceanu notes that in documents of 14th-16th centuries the appellation "Rus" sometimes was not an ethnonym but from an archaic adjective meaning a darker shade of blond hair (cf. Russian русый).

The nickname Turcul meant not only a person of Turkish ethnicity, but also to a person who had traits stereotypically attributed to Turks: stubborn, arrogant, disregardful, etc. Also 'turcul' was synonymous to "pagan". Turcu: 1,023; Turculeț: 1,156.

Cerchez (Circassian) appeared in Romania as a nickname because Circassians were common in the cavalry of the Ottoman Empire. In 2013 there were 877 persons with the surname.

Other common Romanian ethnonymic surnames include Arnăut (Albanians), Ceh (Czech), Frâncu/Frîncu, Grecu (Greek), Leahu (Pole), Neamțu (German), Muscalu (Russian, Muscovite), Ungur, and Maghiar (Hungarian).

== China ==
Historically, Han Chinese people used surnames, while ethnic groups living in North and Central Asia did not. As people from these groups socially interacted with Han Chinese, they were given surnames based on their tribe of origin (more common with North Asian groups) or country of origin (more common with Central Asian groups).

Examples:

- Zhu (Chinese: 竺) from Tianzhu (the Chinese word for India).
- Zhi (Chinese: 支) from Yuezhi or its successor state, the Kushan Empire.
- An (Chinese: 安) from Anxi (the Chinese word for Arsacid)
- Yu (Chinese: 于) from Yutian (the Chinese word for Khotan).
- Kang (Chinese: 康) from Kangju, which was a designation for Sogdiana.
- Ju (Chinese: 車) from the Jushi Kingdom.
- Qin (Chinese: 秦) from Daqin (the Roman Empire).

== Other languages ==
In many languages there are surnames derived from the ethnicity "German":

Finnish language: Suomalainen or Suominen (Finn) Ruotsalainen (Swede) Venäläinen (Russian) Virolainen (Estonian), Karjalainen (Karelian). In Finland, there are also the Finland Swedish surnames Finne (Finn) and Estlander (old name for Estonian)

French language: Lallemand/Lallemant (< "l'Allemand", "the German"), Langlois (< "l'Anglois", old form of modern "l'Anglais", "the English"), Breton, Lenormand/Lenormant (< "le Normand").

Greek surnames: Albanian: Alvanos/Albanos, Arnaoutis, Arvanitis; Bulgarian: Voulgaris, Vlachs (Aromanians and Megleno-Romanians): Vlachos; Serb: Servos; Montenegro: Mavrovouniotis; Armenis (Armenian), Livanos (Lebanese), Frangos (Frank; basically a catch-all term for any Catholic in Greece), Maltezos (Maltese), Roussos (Russian)

In Russia, 2% of Don Cossack surnames are ethnonymic, most common being Gruzinov (Грузинов, from "Georgian"), Nemchinov (Немчинов, from "German"), Tatarinov (Татаринов) Grekov (Греков), Kalmykov (Калмыков), Litvinov (Литвинов), Lyakhov (Ляхов). Also Mordvinov (Mordovian), Polyakov

Turkish language: Türkmen Türkmenoğlu (surname)

=== South Slavic-language surnames ===
Crnogorac (Montenegrin).

Croatian language: Srb (Serb), Tot (Slovak, from Hungarian Tóth), Čeh (Czech), Mađar (Hungarian), Bošnjak (Bosniak)

Slovak language: Slovák, Nemec, Polák, Rusnák, Chorvát
