= Tătaru (disambiguation) =

Tătaru may refer to:

== Places in Romania ==
- Tătaru, a village in Dudeşti Commune, Brăila County
- Tătaru, a village in Comana Commune, Constanţa County
- Tătaru, a village in Poiana Stampei Commune, Suceava County
- Tătaru, a village in Măicănești Commune, Vrancea County
- Tătaru, a commune in Prahova County.

== Other uses ==
- Tătaru (surname)
- Tătaru Mare Island
- Tătaru River (disambiguation)

== See also ==
- Tătărăni, Vaslui County, Western Moldavia, Romania
- Tătărani, Dâmbovița County, Muntenia, Romania
- Tătărășeni (disambiguation)
- Tătărăști, Bacău County, Western Moldavia, Romania
- Tătărăștii (disambiguation)
- Tătărești (disambiguation)
