= Lytwyn =

Lytwyn is a surname. A spelling variant of the surname Lytvyn, it denoted residents of the Grand Duchy of Lithuania, a multi-ethnic historical state in northeastern Europe.

Other forms include Litvin and Litwin. Lytwyn may refer to:

- Charlie Lytwyn (born 1964), Scottish footballer
- Kevin Lytwyn (born 1991), Canadian gymnast
- Ken Lytwyn (born 1965), Marine mammalogist
