= Sârbu =

- Language: Romanian

Origin
- Meaning: Serb
- Region of origin: Romania, Moldova, Serbia, Hungary

Other names
- Variant forms: Sârbul; Sîrbu; Sărbu

Sârbu (Romanian pronunciation: [sɨrbu]; also Sârbul, Sîrbu, and Sărbu) is a Romanian-language ethnonymic surname, used in both Romania and Moldova, as well as throughout the Balkans. Meaning "Serb", it is one of the most common surnames denoting ethnic origin; according to folklorist Pericle Papahagi, it has a very early presence among the Aromanians, evidencing their direct contacts with the White Serbs. "Unusually popular among the Daco-Romanians", it makes its first recorded appearance among the boyardom of 1430s Moldavia, distinguishing "Bodea Sârbul" from another Bodea, nicknamed Rumârul [sic], "the Romanian". Philologist Ioan Bilețchi-Albescu argues that "Sârbu" and other related surnames indicate voluntary Romanianization, or "merging into the Romanian mass", on the part of Romanian Serbs.

== History ==
Like a number of related surnames and place names, "Sârbu" failed to distinguish between Serbs and other South Slavs, being equally used for Serbs and Bulgarians, and peaking in usage as both communities migrated to Moldavia and Wallachia during the Russo-Turkish Wars (1711–1878). Building on observations made by scholars such as Valentin Moshkov and Ivan Grec, historian Ivan Duminică argues that local bureaucrats intentionally mislabeled Bulgarians as "Serbs": as tributary states of the Ottoman Empire, Wallachia and Moldavia risked penalties for their contribution to the exodus from Turkish Bulgaria. Bulgarian Romanian linguist Iorgu Iordan suggests that Bulgarians voluntarily mislabeled themselves as "Serbs" to obtain fiscal privileges that Wallachia only guaranteed for that community. Iordan notes that, before being "Serbs", Bulgarians were primarily known as Șchei, from the Latin Sclaveni, which was a record of their inferior social status.

In 1994, the University of Craiova database counted 33,958 citizens of Romania with the surname "Sârbu", well ahead of some derivatives—including "Sârbulescu" (467 namesakes) and "Sârbescu" (401). "Sârbu" has had some attested usage as a first name, in contexts where it evidenced national origin or expressed Serbophilia; it has alternatively been used as an occupational surname, originally as a nickname for gardeners, some of whom were Romanian locals. It is also one of several Romanian anthroponyms calqued into Ukrainian by the Hutsuls of Bukovina, where its only current use is as a dog's name.

"Sârbu" is conceptually related to the name "Rațiu", which is much more widespread in Transylvania and ultimately derives from the Hungarian-language rác ("Rascian"). In the Banat region, which was for long part of the Habsburg monarchy, there was a coexistence of Serbs and Romanians, which also contributed to the name's geographical spread. The presence of a "Romanianized Serb population" outside Șiria contributed to a (factually disputed) legend that the 19th and early-20th-century novelist Ioan Slavici was born "Ioan Sârbu". Alongside "Sârbin", "Sârbu" has been perpetuated as a surname among the Romanians of Serbia (more specifically, those of Vojvodina). Its immediate origin here is unclear—possibly derived from the ethnonym, it may also indicate that the bearers originated in Transylvania or Wallachia, in any of the places that were already known as "Sârbi". Slightly to the north of this area, the Romanians of Hungary also preserve variants of the name. Scholars such as Mihai Cozma of Szeged University propose that this and other evidence may prove that the Romanians of Méhkerék were originally Serbs.

The name enjoyed popularity in Moldavia's eastern region of "Bessarabia", most of which is currently folded into the Republic of Moldova. In 1774, immigrants who populated the villages around Orhei were designated with their first name and the lowercase sârbul, indicative of their status. Following the 1812 Treaty of Bucharest, Russian Empire annexed those areas, ruling them as the "Bessarabia Governorate", which was home to a distinct Bulgarian community, as well as being an area of Serb emigration. As noted by historian Iurie Colesnic, the Sârbus of Bessarabia evoked that region's status as a "bridgehead for Serbs to prepare their liberation from the Ottoman yoke". There were also documented arrivals of Bulgarians with the surname Sârbu—from as early as 1815, when Bratan Sârbul and his family settled in Izmail. Late-19th-century arrivals include Ion Sîrbu, né Zaharović, who participated in the Russian Revolution of 1905; his daughter, Victoria, was noted as the lover and secretary of Ștefan Foriș, General Secretary of the Romanian Communist Party in 1940–1944. In 2013, Moldova was home to 14,719 people named "Sârbu".

== People with the surname ==
- Andrei Sârbu (1950–2000), Moldovan painter
- Cristian Sârbu (1897–1961), Romanian poet
- Daciana Sârbu (born 1977), Romanian politician
- Eugene Sârbu (1950–2024), Romanian violinist
- Filimon Sârbu (1916–1941), Romanian communist and anti-fascist
- Ilie Sârbu (born 1950), Romanian politician and theologian
- Ion Dezideriu Sîrbu (1919–1989), Romanian philosopher and diarist
- Iosif Sîrbu (1925–1964), Romanian athlete
- Isidor Sârbu (1887–1980), Moldovan Romanian anti-communist
- Marian Sârbu (born 1958), Romanian politician
- Mariana Sîrbu (1948/9–2023), Romanian classical violinist
- Radu Sîrbu (born 1978), Moldovan-born Romanian singer and producer
- Sergiu Sîrbu (footballer, born 1960) (born 1960), Moldovan football manager and former player

== See also ==
- Sârbi (disambiguation)
- Sârbu River
