= Csáki =

Csáki or Csáky is a Hungarian family name. It may refer to:

- Viktória Csáki, Hungarian handballer
- András Csáki, Hungarian musician
- Csaba Csáki, Hungarian theoretical physicist
- György Csáki, a Count of the Székelys (1402–1403)
- Marianne Csaky, Hungarian writer
- Mihály Csáky (1492–1572), Hungarian noble and statesman
- Josef Csàky, Hungarian artist and sculptor
- István Csáky (1894–1941), Hungarian politician
- Pál Csáky, Slovak politician, of Hungarian minority
- Imre Csáky (cardinal)
- Imre Csáky (Minister of Foreign Affairs)
- Albin Csáky (1841–1912), Hungarian politician
- Károly Csáky (1873–1945), Hungarian military officer and politician

== See also ==
- Csák (disambiguation)
