= Arnaudov =

Arnaudov (Bulgarian: Арнаудов) is a Bulgarian masculine surname, its feminine counterpart is Arnaudova. It may refer to

- Georgi Arnaudov (footballer, born 1929) (1929–2001), Bulgarian football forward
- Georgi Arnaudov (footballer, born 1974) (born 1974), Bulgarian football goalkeeper
- Kristina Arnaudova (born 1979), pop singer from Republic of Macedonia
- Petia Arnaudova, Bulgarian physician
- Tsanko Arnaudov (born 1992), Bulgarian-born Portuguese shot putter
