= Andrei Mudrea =

Moldovan painter (1954–2022)

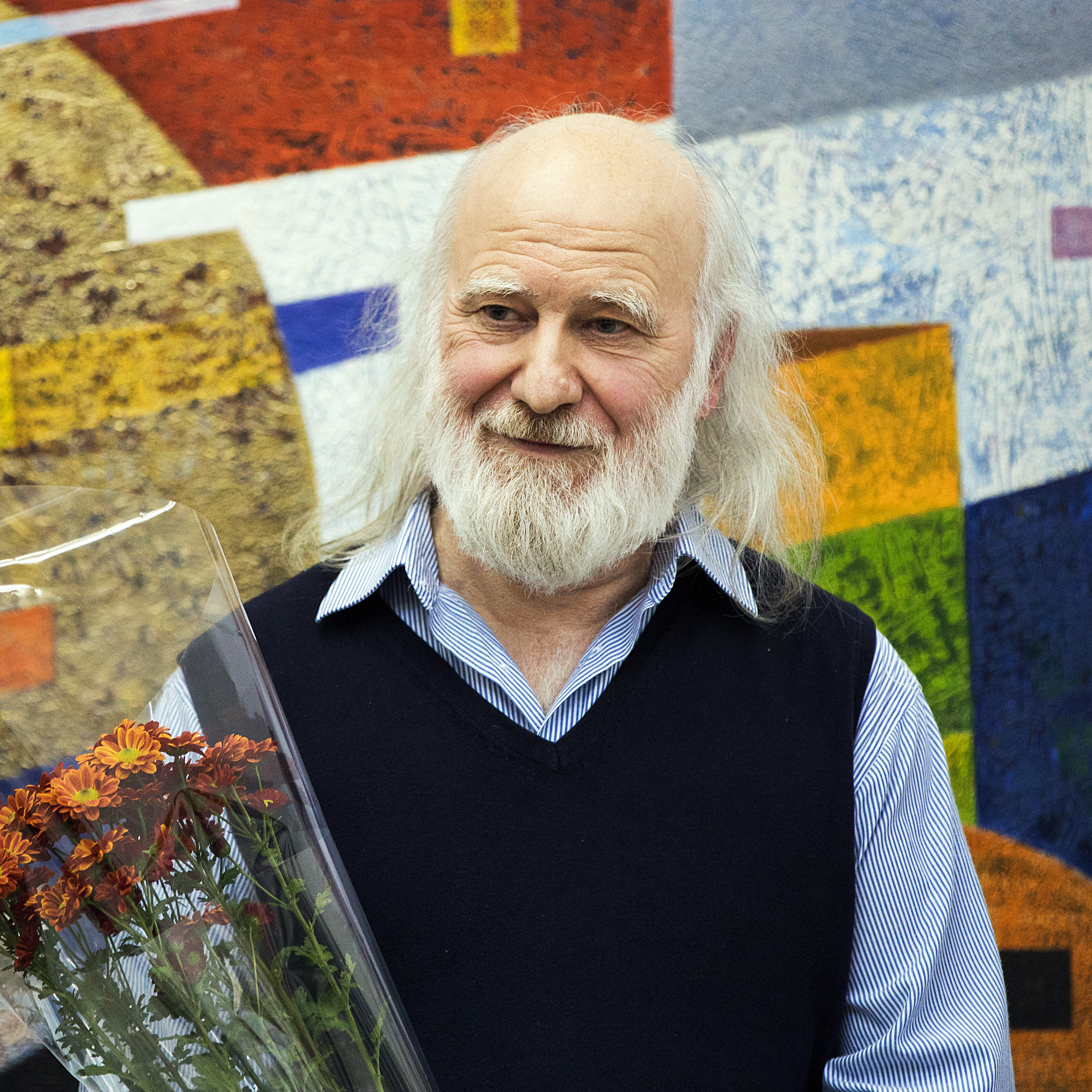
- Mudrea in 2019
- Born: 29 April 1954; Mitocul Vechi, Orhei District, Moldavian SSR, USSR
- Died: 15 January 2022 (aged 67)
- Known for: Painting, sculpture

Andrei Mudrea (29 April 1954 – 15 January 2022) was a Moldovan painter and fine artist. He was one of Mihai Grecu's disciples. He was the creator of paintings, graphics, sculpture, and art-object works. He was the founder and member of "The group of ten". Mudrea's body of work occupies a leading position among the works of Moldovan contemporary and avant-garde art. He was the chairman and a member of various competition panels in the field of fine arts held in Chișinău.

Mudrea's works, created over four decades, record an evolution that marks several stages of ascension. They carry an individual message, of deep philosophical character and those correspond to artistic aspirations and are related to the changes that occur in the national cultural environment.

Mudrea is considered one of the most significant Bessarabian painters. The artist's messages are full of alarming drama, that is usually an encrypted one, hidden in a metaphor, whether it be landscapes, famous Mudri houses or paintings painted in a postmodern manner.

== Biography ==
From 1969 to 1973, Mudrea studied at the School of Fine Arts "I. Repin", currently the Republican College of Fine Arts "Alexandru Plămădeală" in Chișinău, MSSR. From 1975 forward he worked and studied painting in Mihai Grecu's studio. From 1975 until 1985, he was a teacher at the School of Fine Arts for children in Orhei city. In 1978 he debuted with the paintings "Mother" and "The parents' house" (mixed technique, white on white paintings), and from 1978 until his death he participated in all the exhibitions organized by the Union of Plastic Artists of the Republic of Moldova.

Mudrea's works published from 1975 to 1985 bear M. Grecu's influence. The painting of these years attests to the existence of several tangents related to the progressive use of dyes, to obtaining clear-dark effects, texture and volume. The works published in 1985-1995 reveal a new stage in the artist's creation, another way of the master's.

Later, in 1989 he became a member of the Union of Artists of Moldova. In 1990 he participated in the developing of the State Coat of Arms of the Republic of Moldova and is the author and promoter of the "8-ray Star". In 1991-1994 he was a member of the Steering Committee of the Union of Artists of the Republic of Moldova. In 1992 he became the Director of the "Constantin Brâncuși" Exhibition Center of the Union of Artists of the Republic of Moldova. In 1996, he became a Member of the International Association Art (IAA) within UNESCO. Between 1997 and 2003, he became again a member of the Steering Committee of the Union of Artists of the Republic of Moldova. Since 1985 he has been in creative work and was a freelancer. In 2001 he was awarded the honorary title "Honored Master of Arts". He died on 16 January 2022, at the age of 67.

== Personal exhibit ==
In 1983, the first personal exhibition of Andrei Mudrea took place in Chișinău (R. Moldova). In 1988 he went with the first personal exhibition to Moscow (Russia). In 1989 he opened a new personal exhibition in Chișinău, and in 1990 he went with his first personal exhibition to Paris (France). In 1994 he has a new personal exhibition in Chișinău, after which, in 1995, he carried out two personal exhibits in France, one in Paris and another in Saint-Malo. In 1999, he became popular with another personal exhibition "And the God Created the Woman ...", which was organized at the National Museum of Fine Arts in Chișinău. In 2000, the personal exhibition "Separation of the Light from the Darkness" was held at the National Museum of Arts in Chișinău. In 2001 and 2002 he also organized personal exhibitions in Chișinău, and then, only in 2004 he returned with another exhibition "The Universe of Light", opened at the "Constantin Brâncuși" Exhibition Center of the Union of Artists of the Republic of Moldova. Then, he returned every five years with personal exhibitions in which he presented only new works and cycles. Thus, in 2009 it was a personal exhibition "Moments of Light" at the "Constantin Brâncuși" Exhibition Center of the Union of Artists of the Republic of Moldova. In 2011 he opened the personal exhibition "Enigme" at the "Artium" gallery in the Shopping MallDova Center in Chișinău, and in 2014 the personal exhibition "Metamorphoses of Light" that took place at the "Constantin Brâncuși" Exhibition Center of the Union of Artists of the Republic of Moldova. In 2018, he placed his works the "Metamorphoses of Light" at the Council of Europe "Agora" building in Strasbourg (France), and in 2019 he returned with the personal exhibition "Rays of Light" at the Exhibition Center "Constantin Brâncuși" of the Union of Artists of the Republic of Moldova.

== Group representative exhibitions ==
From 1978 until his death, Andrei Mudrea participated in all exhibitions organized by the Union of Artists of the Republic of Moldova. Thus, his works have been exhibited in the youth exhibitions (1986), but also in the exhibitions of graphics (1979), painting (1978 - 2015) and decorative art (2009 - 2015). In 1992, he organized the creative group "Ten" and opened the exhibition "The Group of Ten" with colleagues Andrei Sârbu, Anatol Rurac, Dumitru Bolboceanu, Vasile Moșanu, Ilie Cojocaru, Tudor Zbârnea, Dumitru Peicev, Victor Hristov and Iurie Platon. Together with them, he participated in several exhibitions promoting the group both at home and abroad. A decade later, in 2002 he inaugurated the 10th anniversary exhibition of the group "Ten". At the same time, he also participated with his works at the Autumn Salons (1978), the Falls (1980 - 2015), Spring Salons (1980 - 2015) and at the Moldovan Salons Chișinău - Bacău (1991 - 2015, R. Moldova - Romania). He also participated in all the fine arts competitions organized by the Union of Artists of the Republic of Moldova, as well as at the thematic exhibitions such as "Homage to Mihai Eminescu" (1989 - 2014) and "Homage to Grigore Vieru" (2010).

== International representative exhibitions ==
He participated for the first time in an international group exhibition that took place in 1985 in Moscow (Russia). In 1987 he went to Warsaw (Poland), and in 1988 he took part in the international exhibition entitled "Days of Soviet Culture" held in Paris (France). Between 1988 and 2012, he participated in several more international exhibitions in Portugal, Ukraine, Russia, Italy, France, Germany and Romania. In 2009 he exhibited for the first time at the International Painting Biennale organized in Chișinău (Moldova) and since then, he participated every time when it was organized. In 2011 he participated in the International Biennial of painting, graphics and sculpture "Meeting point 2011", the third edition, held in Arad (Romania). In 2012 and 2014 he participated in the International Biennial of Decorative Art in Chișinău, and in 2016 he participated in the group exhibition "Eternal Colors" organized by the "Europe's Art" Gallery in Chișinău. In 2018 he participated for the first time at the interior design exhibitions: "Moldavian Design Week 2018" and "Das Design Day 2018" with the art objects made for the last five years.

== Awards ==
Andrei Mudrea is a winner of several awards, prizes, medals and trophies at the different national and international art competitions and salons, among which:

- 1988, the silver medal for the "Silence" painting, Moscow (Russia);
- 1989, the winner of the Boris Glavan Prize awarded by the Central Committee of the Leninist Comsomol of the Moldovan SSR;
- 1990, the Prize of the Supreme Council for the development of the State Coat of Arms of the Republic of Moldova;
- 1991, the special Prize for the "Barbed Wire" painting, Bacău (Romania);
- 1994, the Prize of the newspaper "Literature and Art" for the cycle of works "History of Moldova", Chișinău (R. Moldova);
- 1994, Diploma of Honor, Saint Elpidio (Italy);
- 1995, the winner at the National Exhibition of Fine Arts, Veigné (France);
- 1995, United Nations (UN) Prize for the "Dialog" painting;
- 1996, Special Prize for Painting, Chișinau (R. Moldova);
- 1996, Metropolitan Varlaam Society Award for the painting "Biblical stories", Chișinău (R. Moldova);
- 1998, Special Prize for Painting, Chișinău (R. Moldova);
- 2001, honorary title "Honored Master of Arts", Chișinău (R. Moldova);
- 2002, the Prize of the Union of Artists of the Republic of Moldova for Painting, Chișinău (R. Moldova);
- 2004, the Republic of Moldova Ministry of Culture Award for the painting "Stephen the Great and Holy", Chișinău (R. Moldova);
- 2004, the exhibition "The Universe of Light" the "Exhibition of the Year" Prize awarded by the Union of Artists of the Republic of Moldova for Chișinău (R. Moldova);
- 2006, the Prize of the Union of Artists of the Republic of Moldova for the sculpture "The Last Supper", Chișinău (R. Moldova);
- 2014, the first prize for the painting "Time passes, time comes ..." within the tenth edition of the exhibition "Eminesciana", Chișinău(R. Moldova);
- 2015, "VIP magazine" handed him the trophy "Man of the Year." Top 100 "and called him the «Painter of the Year 2014 ", Chișinău (R. Moldova);
- 2015, the Ministry of Culture of the Republic of Moldova and the Union of Artists of the Republic of Moldova awarded him the Diploma of Merit for participation at the exhibition-contest of contemporary art "Autumn - 2015", Chișinău (R. Moldova);
- 2015, the Bacău County Council and the "Iulian Antonescu" Museum Complex of Bacău awarded him the Anniversary Diploma and the anniversary plaque "Saloons of Moldova - 25 years of existence" for the consistency and generosity of serving the idea of two Moldovan cities - Bacău and Chișinău – the bridge of faith in keeping the identity of the Romanian language, history, culture and spiritual community, Bacău (Romania);
- 2016, won the 1st Prize of the Union of Artists of the Republic of Moldova for the painting "White Church" at the exhibition-contest of Contemporary Fine Arts "Recviem-2016 ";
- 2018, the 1st Prize for the "Silence" painting at the exhibition-contest of Contemporary Fine Arts "Recviem-2018", Chișinău (R. Moldova).

== Collectibles ==
The artist's paintings and art objects are in several public collections, such as: Ministry of Culture, Chișinău (R. Moldova); Ministry of Culture, Moscow (Russia); The Fund of the Union of Artists, Chișinău (R. Moldova); The Fund of the Artists, Moscow (Russia); National Museum of Art, Chișinău (R. Moldova); The Museum of Romanian Literature "Mihail Cogălniceanu", Chișinău (R. Moldova); Alexei Mateevici Museum, Chișinău (R. Moldova), but also in private collections in Africa, Austria, Canada, France, Germany, Italy, Great Britain, Netherlands, Poland, Portugal, Republic of Moldova, Romania, Russia, United States and Ukraine.

== Documentaries and reportages ==
Several documentaries were filmed about the artist's creation and life:

- 1985, "The tribute to the Old Orhei", directed by L. Stankevici, Republic of Moldova TV;
- 1989, "Andrei Mudrea. The winner of the Moldova Youth Prize", directed by Nelly Canțer, Republic of Moldova TV;
- 1994, "In the world of the Arts. The painter Andrei Mudrea", directed by Nelly Canțer, The "Olimp" Art Studio. Republic of Moldova;
- 1999, "And God created the Woman ...", directed by L. Stankevici, Republic of Moldova TV;
- 2000, "Breaking the Light of Darkness", directed by Nelly Canțer, Republic of Moldova TV;
- 2009, "Moments of Light with Andrei Mudrea" by Irina Nechit, Jurnal TV, Republic of Moldova;

"Interviews for Sunday evenings. Protagonist - Andrei Mudrea ", by Maria Bulat-Saharneanu, Voice of Basarabia Radio, Republic of Moldova;

- 2013, "For a Coffee – the invitee Andrei Mudrea" by Doina Popa at Prime TV, Republic of Moldova;
- 2014, "It's like an exam for me". Acasă TV, Republic of Moldova;

"Andrei Mudrea: Metamorphoses of Light, exhibition at Brâncuși Hall" by Vasile Botnaru, at Radio Free Europe, Republic of Moldova;
"Cultural Dialogues" by Veaceslav Gheorghishenco, Teleradio-Moldova, Republic of Moldova;

- 2017, "Andrei Mudrea. Fresh look at routine" Morning on the STS, Republic of Moldova;

"Andrei Mudrea transformed his courtyard into a true art museum! A fairytale location that must be seen even by you". "The perfect evening" TV Show, Republic of Moldova;
"Andrei Mudrea: I need to see that the world can enjoy my life's work. The story told by the artist about his new outcome." "The perfect evening" TV Show, Republic of Moldova;
"He makes real masterpieces from old objects. Andrei Mudrea, a modern artist, who wants to teach people to discover art even in the seemingly useless things", Canal 2, "Good Talks with Lilu", Republic of Moldova;

- 2018, "Andrei Mudrea's works seem to challenge the conceptions of the modern art", TVR Moldova, Republic of Moldova;
- 2019, "Visiting the Master Andrei Mudrea! Exhibition of Modern Art!" by Amira Apian, Republic of Moldova;

"Andrei Mudrea: I always dreamed of being part of the beautiful world of modern art", Positive News, Republic of Moldova;
"Unique exhibition of painting and object art, signed by Andrei Mudrea", Sputnik Moldova, Republic of Moldova.

== Movies ==
During his artistic career, Andrei Mudrea has also starred in several movies:

- 1988, the movie "Iona", directed by Valeriu Jereghi, Moldova-Film Production;
- 1989, the movie "The Dissident", directed by Valeriu Jereghi, Moldova-Film Production;
- 2008, the movie "Arrivederci", directed by Valeriu Jereghi, Prim-Plan Studio Production.

== Creation camps, symposiums ==
In 1988 he went to Senej (Russian Federation), in 1991 he participated in a creative camp in Câmpina (Romania), and in 1994 he came to Tescani (Romania). In 2003 he organized the first edition of the painting camp "The Old Orhei" held in the Old Orhei and continued the tradition by 2005. In 2006 there is the creation camp "Euro-integration through Art" in the Old Orhei and the Modern Art Camp in Chișinău.

== Books, catalogues, leaflets ==
- 1993, The catalogue "Andrei Mudrea. Painting", Publishing House "Universitas", Chișinău, Moldova;
- 1998, The catalogue "Andrei Mudrea. Painting”, Publishing House "PRAG-3”, Chișinău, Moldova;
- 1998, The encyclopedia of the modern artists, Publishing House "Arc-2000”, Chișinău, Moldova;
- 2002, The leaflet "The group of ten", Publishing House "Atelier", Chișinău, Moldova;
- 2004, The catalogue "Andrei Mudrea. Paintings", Publishing House "Atelier", Chișinău, Moldova;
- 2009, The brochure "Andrei Mudrea. Paintings. Art object. Moments of Light", Chișinău, Moldova;
- 2012, The poems "Dream", Publishing House "Prut Internațional", Chișinău, Moldova;
- 2014, The brochure "Andrei Mudrea. The metamorphoses of Light. Paintings and art object", Chișinău, Moldova;
- 2019, The album of picture and art object "Andrei Mudrea", Publishing House "Arc", Chișinău, Moldova;
- 2019, The brochure "Andrei Mudrea. Rays of Lights. Picture and art object", Chișinău, Moldova.

== Critics ==
"When the thirst draws us near a well, we drink the refreshing water, we thank in our mind the ones who came down to the depths of the earth to call it under the sun for all. The same impulse to thank, but, this time, for the quench of thirst for light, I had when admiring the paintings of the painter Andrei Mudrea. In the pictures, all of them - people, objects and the atmosphere - everything is enveloped, exalted, penetrated by the light. Even the stones ... If I would try to find in my memory a replica of this original and of the talent full of dignity, I would imagine it like a solar river, dripping stormily between old and new walls, through the stony fluorescence of the relief, crossing with haste the green of the saddles and approaching more and more softly to our souls, illuminating and ennobling them and calls them gently to the Universe of Light. "

Leonida Lari, poet, journalist, writer, 2004.

***

"(...) Remaining lyrical and poetic at the beginning of his creation, A. Mudrea evolves, making the pictures of a profound dramatic character, specific to the times and, at the same time, remaining permanently as an author of spiritual messages, encrypted in the context of images embodied in the vestments of the parable and metaphor. The Andrei Mudrea’s works, undoubtedly, represent a true page of the modern art, valid both in the country and abroad."

Tudor Stăvilă, PhD in arts study, 2013.
