= Suomalainen =

Suomalainen is a Finnish word, meaning "Finn." It may refer to:

- Suomalainen (surname)
- Suomalainen (newspaper), a short-lived weekly published by the Socialist Party of America
- Suomalainen Kirjakauppa, a bookstore chain
