= Sergiu Sîrbu =

Sergiu Sîrbu may refer to:

- Sergiu Sîrbu (footballer, born 1960), Moldovan football manager; ex-footballer
- Sergiu Sîrbu (footballer, born 1986), Moldovan footballer
- Sergiu Sîrbu (politician) (born 1980), Moldovan politician, deputy in Moldovan Parliament between 2010 and 2014

== See also ==
- Sârbu or Sîrbu, a Romanian-language ethnonymic surname
