= Mordvins (disambiguation) =

Mordvins is an official term for the Erzyas and Mokshas as a single ethnic group in Russian Federation since 1928.

Mordvins, Mordvin, Mordovian, or Mordva may also refer to:

== People ==
- Mordvin Tatars, historical Russian term used to refer to nobility of Volga Tatar, Volga Finnic and Burtas descent

== Languages ==
- Mordvinic languages, a subgroup of the Uralic languages comprising the Erzya and Moksha languages

== Places ==
- Mordovia, a republic of Russia established in 1928

== Arts and entertainment ==
- Mordovian cuisine, traditional cuisine of Erzyas and Mokshas
- Mordovian national costume, folk costume of Erzyas and Mokshas
- 2015 CS Mordovian Ornament, a senior international figure skating competition in the 2015–16 season
- Mordvin native religion, another name of Erzyan native religion and its modern revival

== See also ==
- Mordvinov, a surname
- Mordovka, a historical Russian currency
