= Magyar (surname) =

Magyar (Hungarian: [ˈmɒɟɒr]) is a Hungarian-language ethnonymic surname meaning "Hungarian" in Hungarian. Notable people with the surname include:

- Adam Magyar (born 1972), Hungarian photographer and video artist
- Anna Magyar, Hungarian politician and former MP
- Armand Magyar (1898–1961), Hungarian wrestler
- Bálint Magyar (born 1952), Hungarian politician and former Minister of Education
- Benigna Magyar, Hungarian medieval noblewoman
- Blaise Magyar, Hungarian military leader under John Hunyadi
- Derek Magyar, American actor
- Ede Magyar (1877–1912), Hungarian architect
- Eugene Magyar (1909–1968), first and only bishop of the Slovak National Catholic Church
- György Magyar (born 1949), Hungarian lawyer and politician
- Imre Magyar, Hungarian rower
- István Magyar (1864–1954), Hungarian jurist
- Janos Magyar (born 1927), former Hungarian footballer
- Lajos Magyar (1891–1940), Hungarian Communist journalist and sinologist
- László Magyar (1818–1864), Hungarian cartographer and explorer
- Mark Magyar (born 1990), former Hungarian pair skater
- Péter Magyar (born 1981), Hungarian politician
- Richard Magyar (born 1991), Swedish footballer
- Tibor Magyar, Hungarian cyclist
- Zoltán Magyar (born 1953), Hungarian gymnast
