= Monique F. Leroux =

Canadian businessperson

Monique F. Leroux CC OQ
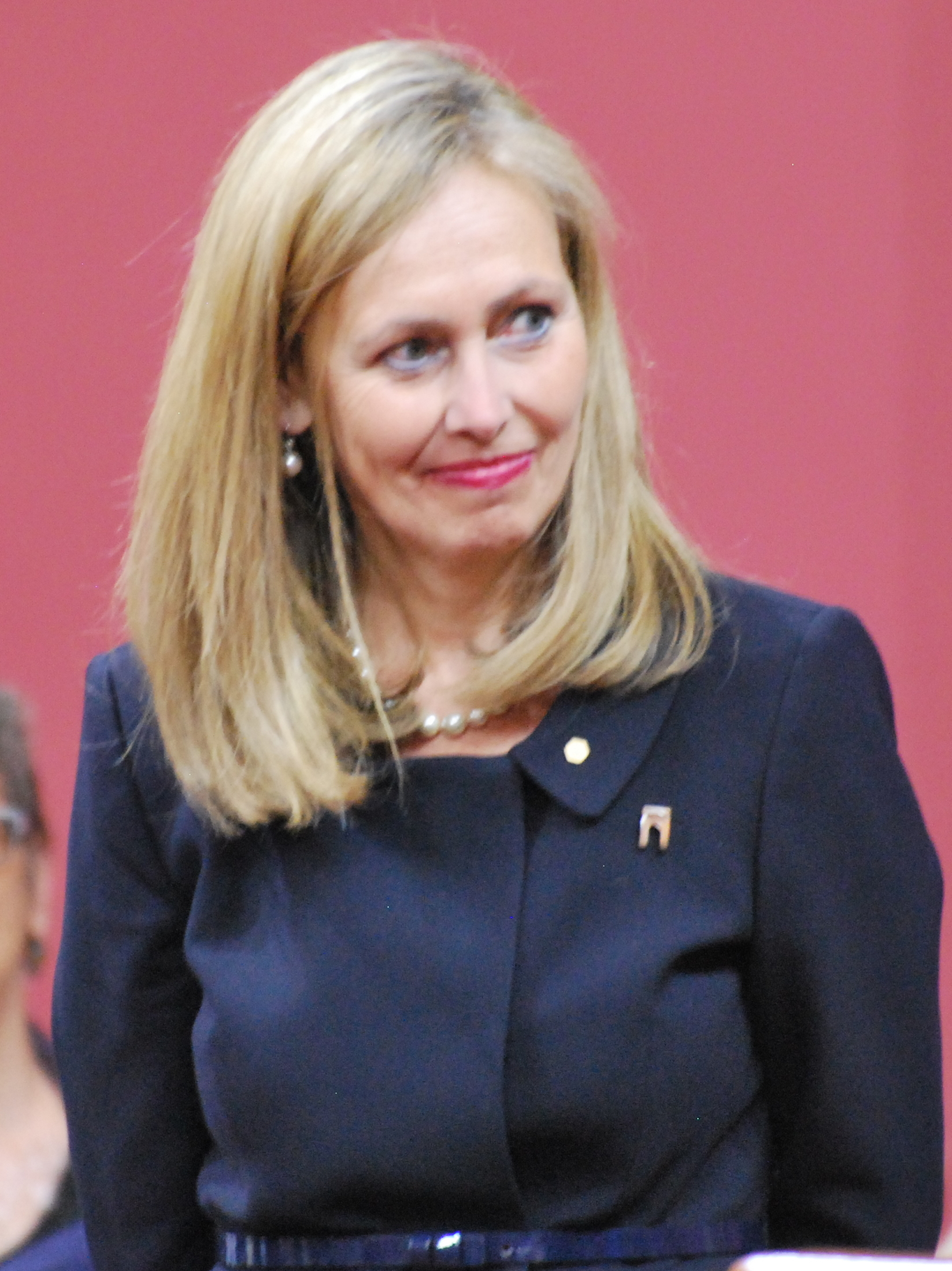
- Leroux in 2013
- Born: August 11, 1954 (age 72); Montreal, Quebec, Canada
- Education: Université du Québec à Chicoutimi
- Occupations: Corporate Director, Michelin (2015–Present), Corporate Director, S&P Global (2016 – Present), Corporate Director, Couche-Tard (2015 – Present), Corporate Director, Bell Canada (2016 – Present), Senior Advisor, Fiera Capital (2016 – Present), Corporate Director Lallemand (2017 – Present)
- Known for: President of Desjardins from 2008-2016
- Board member of: Chairwoman of the Strategy Council - Gouvernement of Canada - (2020 - Present); Vice-Chairwoman of the Board - Montreal Symphony Orchestra - (2019- Present); Member of the board - Université de Sherbrooke - (2020 - Present)

Monique Forget Leroux CC OQ (born August 11, 1954, in Montreal, Quebec) is a Canadian businesswoman. From 2008 to 2016, she was chair of the board and chief executive officer of Desjardins Group.

A Companion of the Canadian Business Hall of Fame and the Securities Industry Hall of Fame, Leroux is now a company director.

Leroux is a Companion of the Order of Canada, an Officer of the Order of Quebec, a Knight of the National Order of the Legion of Honour (France), and a recipient of the Woodrow Wilson Award (USA). She has received the titles of Fellow from the Order of CPAs, the Institute of Corporate Directors of Canada, and honorary doctorates from eight Canadian universities to recognize her contribution to the business sector and the community.

She has also published three books.

== Background ==
Monique F. Leroux was originally destined for music and attended the Conservatory before switching to accounting. She enrolled in accounting in Chicoutimi. She also holds a bachelor's degree in administration from the Université du Québec. Monique F. Leroux is married to a physicist and has one adopted daughter.

== Career ==
Before joining Desjardins Group in 2001, Leroux was chief operating officer of Québecor Inc., senior vice-president, finance (head office) and senior vice-president, Quebec operations of RBC (Royal Bank of Canada), and managing partner for the financial services sector at Ernst & Young in Canada. She was also president of the Ordre des CPA du Québec and governor of the Canadian Institute of Chartered Accountants.

From March 2008 to April 2016, Leroux was chair of the board and chief executive officer of Desjardins Group, Canada's largest cooperative financial group, as well as its executive committee and its governance and human resources committees. She chaired the board of directors of Caisse centrale Desjardins and Desjardins Financial Corporation, and also was chief executive officer of Desjardins General Insurance Group and Desjardins Financial Security.

During her mandate, which ended in April 2016, Desjardins Group experienced remarkable growth and overall performance. Under her leadership, Desjardins completed major transactions and entered into strategic partnerships, thereby contributing to the positioning of Desjardins at the Canadian and international levels. Desjardins Group, the largest private employer in Québec and among the top twenty in Canada, was also recognized as an employer of choice in Canada and as the strongest financial institution in North America and fifth in the world according to Bloomberg, based on the quality of its balance sheet and capital.

From 2013 to 2017, Leroux also was a board member and then President of the International Co-operative Alliance (ICA) a global organization representing more than 2.5 million businesses, generating more than $3 trillion in sales, in more than 100 countries, and was the first Canadian and North American woman to hold this prestigious position. She was also the founder and president of the International Co-operative Summit, a biennial world-class economic and cooperative event.

In 2018, Leroux was co-chair of the B7 Summit in Canada. She chaired the High Level Contact Group of the European Cooperative Banking Group. She was a member of the B20 Working Group on Financing for Growth and co-chair of the B20 Working Group on Small and Medium Enterprises (Germany 2017). Ms. Leroux represented the Canadian business group at the B7 Summit in Berlin in 2015. She also participated in the G7 Forum for Dialogue with Women and the G20 Leaders' Summit.

Leroux is a Fellow of the Institute of Corporate Directors of Canada (ICD) and an independent member of the boards of Michelin (ML) and chair of its CSR Committee, Bell/BCE and chair of its corporate governance committee, Couche-Tard (ATD) and Lallemand, LHOIST and LG2 global private companies. Mrs. Leroux was a member of the board of (SPGI), S&P Global from 2016 to 2022.

She was chair of the Industrial Strategy Council (Canada) and vice-chair of Fiera Management Inc. She is a Senior Advisor for TENEO and she acted as a strategic advisor to Fiera Capital from 2017 to 2023 and was appointed Canadian vice-chair of the Trilateral Commission. She has also chaired the Government of Quebec's Advisory Council on the Economy and Innovation, the board of directors of Investissement Québec, the working committee on the status of Montreal as a metropolis and was a member of the Canadian-American Council for the Advancement of Women Entrepreneurs.

She devotes her time to several non-profit organizations and has a particular interest in education and youth. She is vice-chair of the board of the Montreal Symphony Orchestra and chair of the board of the Université de Sherbrooke, the Conservatoire de musique et d'art dramatique du Québec and chair of the Advisory Committee of The Neuro (Montreal Neurological Institute-Hospital). She has was chair of the board of governors of the Société des célébrations du 375e anniversaire de Montréal. She has been a member of the board and executive committee of the Rideau Hall Foundation since 2015, as well as a member of the advisory committee of the Order of Canada for the Governor-General of Canada. She also co-chaired the annual campaign of Centraide of Greater Montreal in 2014 and chaired the Canada Summer Games in Sherbrooke in 2013.

She resides in Outremont, Quebec.

== Works ==
- Ma vie en mouvement : l'histoire de la première femme à la tête du Mouvement Desjardins, Les Éditions Transcontinental : Les Affaires, 2016.
- Carnet de rencontres Lévis, Québec, Les Éditions Dorimène, Fédération des caisses Desjardins, 2014.
  - Conversations on cooperation, Les Éditions Dorimène, Fédération des caisses Desjardins du Québec, 2014.
- Alphonse Desjardins : le pouvoir d'agir : citations sur la pertinence du modèle coopératif, Les Éditions Dorimène, Fédération des caisses Desjardins, 2012
  - Alphonse Desjardins : a vision for today's world, Fédération des caisses Desjardins du Québec, 2012

== Honours and awards ==
- 2010: Recipient of an honorary doctorate from the Université du Québec à Chicoutimi
- 2011: Recipient of the Woodrow Wilson Award
- 2011: Recipient of an honorary doctorate from Concordia University
- 2011: Recipient of an honorary doctorate from Bishop's University
- 2012: Member of the Order of Canada
- 2012: Knight of the National Order of the Legion of Honour
- 2012: Recipient of an honorary doctorate from the University of Sherbrooke
- 2012: Recipient of an honorary doctorate from the University of Ottawa
- 2013: Officer of the National Order of Quebec
- 2013 : Recipient of the Prix Hommage and Fellow of the Ordre des CPA
- 2013: Recipient of an honorary doctorate from the University of Montreal
- 2014-2020 : Honorary Lieutenant-Colonel of the Régiment de la Chaudière and member of the advisory board of the 22nd Regiment of Canada
- 2015: Honoured with the title of Fellow of the Institute of Corporate Directors (ICD)
- 2015: Inducted into the Entrepreneurs Club of the Conseil du patronat du Québec
- 2015: Inducted into the Canadian Business Hall of Fame
- 2015: Recipient of the Fellows Award from the Institute of Corporate Directors of Canada
- 2015: Awarded an honorary doctorate by the Royal Military College of Canada
- 2015: Recipient of an honorary doctorate from Saint Mary's University
- 2016: Honorary citizen of the city of Lévis in recognition of her exceptional economic and societal contribution
- 2018: Inducted into the Securities Industry Hall of Fame
- 2019 : Recipient of the Cooperative Excellence Award from Cooperatives and Mutuals Canada for its contribution to the development of the cooperative movement
- 2021: Awarded an honorary doctorate from Carleton University
- 2024: Companion of the Order of Canada
- 2024: Awarded an honorary doctorate from McGill University
- 2024: Awarded an honorary doctorate from Université Laval
