= Sarbi (disambiguation) =

Sarbi may refer to:

- Sarbi, the Australian explosives detection dog
- Sarbi, a village in Iran
- Särbi, contemporary reconstruction of the authentic name for Xianbei
- Sârbi (disambiguation), a number of places in Romania

== See also ==
- Sarby
