= Rusznyák =

Rusznyak is a Hungarian-language ethnonymic surname literally meaning "person of Ruthenian/Rusyn ethnicity".

- István Rusznyák
- István Rusznyák
- Karol Rusznyák

== See also ==
- Rusnak (surname)
