= Tătărăștii =

Tătărăștii may refer to several places in Romania:

- Tătărăștii de Jos, a commune in Teleorman County
- Tătărăștii de Sus, a commune in Teleorman County
- Tătărăștii de Criș, a village in Vața de Jos Commune, Alba County

== See also ==
- Tătaru (disambiguation)
- Tătărești (disambiguation)
- Tătărășeni (disambiguation)
- Tătărăști
