= Fire Zuave =

American indie rock band

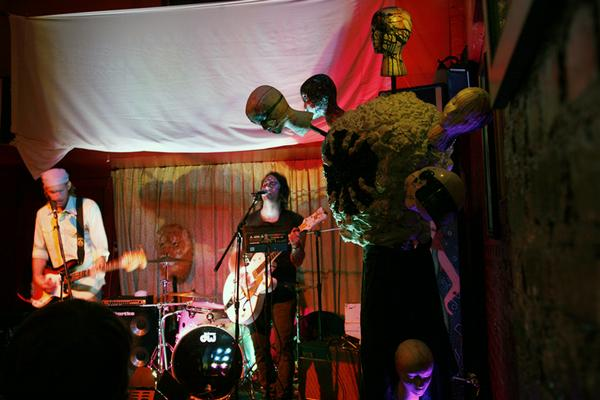
- Fire Zuave performing in Athens, Georgia, in 2008.

Background information
- Origin: West Palm Beach, Florida, United States
- Genres: alternative country, indie rock
- Years active: 2007–present
- Label: unsigned
- Members: Chuck Andrews, Jason Fusco, Fabulous Bird, Fletcher Sheehan
- Past members: Jason Hermes, Chris Cartrett
- Website: www.firezuave.com

Fire Zuave is an American indie rock band formed in 2007 in West Palm Beach, Florida.

== History ==
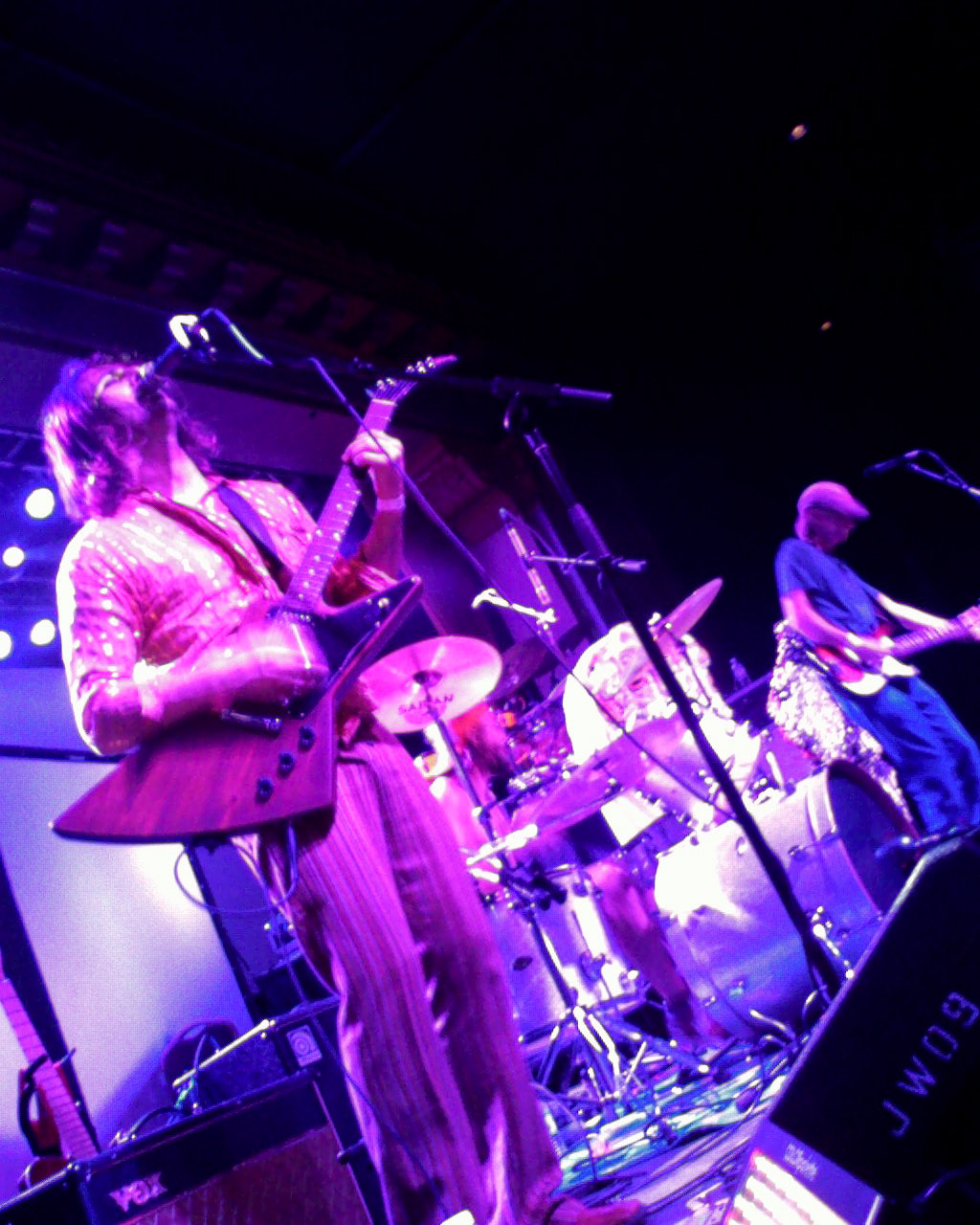
fire Zuave performing at the Ritz Ybor in Tampa, FL on December 8th, 2008.

Chuck Andrews, formerly of Cleveland-based Americana band Qwasi Qwa, relocated to South Florida in 2004. There, he began performing as a solo artist. Soon thereafter, Chuck met Chris Cartrett, formerly of Doorway27, and both decided to join forces as The Guns. By late 2007, the band was already opening for international acts such as the Black Crowes, and recording their first album Sand Fastened. Around the same time, they changed their name to fire Zuave. In mid-2008, drummer Jason Hermes left the band and was replaced by drummer Jason Fusco.

In support of their first album, fire Zuave began touring in 2008. Their Athens, Georgia, performance included Disney Herpes, a one-off skit show created by David Barnes and Kevin Barnes, with the help of Josh Skinner. In December 2008, the band opened for of Montreal and the Fiery Furnaces during a handful of dates across Florida. The band has subsequently opened for of Montreal in 2009 and 2010.

Sand Fastened was released in May 2008 to generally favorable reviews. It also granted the band the Artist of the Week spot on the Indie Face Of Music blog. On April 7, 2009, the band's second album, Oscillation Isolator was released independently. David Barnes is credited with Sand Fastened and also contributes, along with Nina Barnes, to the Oscillation Isolator artwork.

In 2009, Chuck Andrews and Jason Fusco relocated to Athens, Georgia, and Chris Cartrett departed from the band. In July 2009, Pete Alvanos, aka Fabulous Bird, joined the band and they began work on their third album. The band's first music video, "Colors of the Sun", was voted into the semi-finals for the 2009 Babelgum Music Video Awards. Fire Zuave was featured by Polyvinyl Records at the 2010 SXSW music festival.

== Style ==
The band's first album, Sand Fastened, shows a mix of alternative country, acoustic and indie rock, ranging from fast-paced power pop numbers, such as opening track "Starving Like A Pack Of Wolves" or "Translated Dragon" to mellower, acoustic-tinged ballads, such as "Colors Of The Sun" or "Emily." Oscillation Isolator has a more psychedelic folk rock influence, though the alternative country influence is still apparent.

Despite the involvement of Of Montreal's Kevin Barnes in band recordings, Fire Zuave's music bears little resemblance to Of Montreal's, yet like Of Montreal, the band continues to evolve in style. During their stage show masked actors climb around the stage, and avant garde sculptures create a more theatrical and psychedelic atmosphere, similar to Of Montreal. Their use of ping pong balls in the band's promotion is widely documented.

== Discography ==
=== Studio albums ===
Year	Album details
2008	Sand Fastened: Release date: May 2008; Label: self-released
2009	Oscillation Isolator: Release date: April 2009; Label: self-released
2011	Demon Baby: Release date: Label: self-released

=== Music videos ===
Year	Video	Director
2008	"Colors of the Sun"	Diana Lang
