= Yuriy Lytvyn =

Yuriy Lytvyn may refer:

- Yuriy Lytvyn (dissident), Ukrainian lyrical and prose writer, journalist, Soviet dissident
- Yuriy Lytvyn (politician), Ukrainian politician, formerly member of Lytvyn Bloc

== See also ==
- Lytvyn
