= Rusnak (surname) =

Rusnak is a surname. Notable people with the surname include:

- Albert Rusnák (disambiguation), several people
- Albert Rusnak (footballer, born 1994), Slovak footballer
- Darius Rusnak, Slovak ice hockey player
- Don Rusnak, Canadian politician
- John Rusnak, former currency trader
- Josef Rusnak, German screenwriter and director
- Michael Rusnak, member of the Redemptorist Fathers
- Nikolay Stepanovich Rusnak, better known as Metropolitan Nicodemus, former Ukrainian Orthodox metropolitan bishop of Kharkiv and Bohodukhiv
- Ondrej Rusnak, Slovak professional ice hockey player
- Peter Rusnak, bishop of the Eparchy of Bratislava
- Ron Rusnak, former American football player
- Rudolf Gerlach-Rusnak, born: Orest Rusnak, Ukrainian-born German tenor
- Stefan Rusnak, former football player from Slovakia and manager
- Urban Rusnak, Slovak diplomat and academic
- Vladimir Rusnak, former football player from Slovakia and manager

== See also ==
- Rusznyák
