= Oscillation Isolator =

Studio album by Fire Zuave
- Released: 2009
- Recorded: 2008–2009
- Genre: Americana
- Length: ??:??
- Label: unsigned

Oscillation Isolator is the second album by Fire Zuave, released in 2009. It features cover artwork by David Barnes.

== Track listing ==
1. "August Air"
2. "Down By the Sea"
3. "Harmonica"
4. "Orchid"
5. "Prison Break"
6. "Trailor Theme"
7. "45 Caliber"
8. "Will You Ever Understand I'm Not Afraid of Who I Am"
9. "By the Side of a Mountain"
