= Lytvyn =

Lytvyn is a Ukrainian-language ethnonymic surname. It is derived from the Ukrainian spelling to the word "Litvin". Notable people with the surname include:

- Dmytro Lytvyn (born 1996), Ukrainian football player
- Dmytro Lytvyn (advisor) (born 1984), Ukrainian presidential advisor
- Mykola Lytvyn (born 1961), Director of the State Border Guard of Ukraine
- Mykola Lytvyn (footballer)
- Nazar Lytvyn
- Petro Lytvyn (born 1967), Ukrainian military general
- Viktor Lytvyn
- Volodymyr Lytvyn (born 1956), Ukrainian politician, Chairman of the Verkhovna Rada (parliament)
- Yuriy Lytvyn (disambiguation), the name of several people
