= Csák =

Csák may refer to:

- Csák (genus), medieval Hungarian nobility
- Csák (surname)
- Ciacova, a village in Romania
