= Sand Fastened =

Studio album by Fire Zuave
- Released: 2008
- Recorded: 2007–2008
- Genre: Americana
- Label: unsigned

Sand Fastened is the debut album by fire Zuave. Released in 2008, the album features artwork by David Barnes, an artist most known for his contributions to of Montreal album covers.

== Track listing ==
1. "Starving Like a Pack of Wolves"
2. "Way We Were Before"
3. "Different Day"
4. "Colors of the Sun"
5. "Translated Dragon"
6. "Emily"
7. "Gypsies"
8. "Whatever Side You're On"
9. "If You Were Gold"
