= Neamțu =

Neamțu is a Romanian ethnonymic surname literally meaning "German person". Notable people with the surname include:

- Anatol Neamțu (1954–2010), composer, guitarist and arranger from Moldova, member of the band Noroc
- Constantin Neamțu (1868–1962), Romanian politician
- Cristian Neamțu (1980–2002), Romanian football player
- Leonida Neamțu (1934–1991), Romanian writer
- Mihail Neamțu (born 1978), Romanian politician
