= Türkmenoğlu =

Türkmenoğlu can refer to:

- Türkmenoğlu (surname)
- Türkmenoğlu, Devrek
- Türkmenoğlu, Erzincan
