= Aistis =

Aistis is a Lithuanian given name and ethnonymic surname derived from the given name/nickname literally meaning "person from the Aesti tribe". Notable people with the name include:

- Aistis Pilauskas, Lithuanian professional basketball player
- Jonas Aistis, Lithuanian writer, poet, and essayist

== See also ==
- Aistė
