= Alvanos =

Alvanos or Albanos (Greek: Άλβάνος) is a Greek surname literally meaning "Albanian". Notable people with the surname include:

- Alexandros Alvanos (born 1980), Greek retired handball player and current coach
- Pete Alvanos, American high school sports administrator and former college football coach

== See also ==
- Alvano
- Albano (name)
