= Ugrin =

Ugrin or Uhrin may refer to:

Given name

- Ugrin Csák (disambiguation), multiple people

Surname

- Dušan Uhrin (born 1943), Czech and Slovak football coach and former player
- Dušan Uhrin, Jr. (born 1967), Czech football manager
- Tea Ugrin (born 1998), Italian artistic gymnast
