= Muscalu =

Muscalu is a Romanian ethnonymic surname originated from the nickname muscal, "Moskal", i.e., a Russian person. Notable people with the surname include:

- Cristian Muscalu, Romanian footballer
- Ion Muscalu (born 1949), Romanian writer
