= Frâncu =

Frâncu or Frîncu is a Romanian ethnonymic surname originated from the nickname meaning "French person". Notable people with the surname include:

- Amos Frâncu (1866 - 1933), Romanian lawyer and politician, notable supporter of the Great Union
- Doru Frîncu, Romanian bobsledder
- Gedeon Frâncu (1894–1955) Romanian politician, M.P.
- Victoria Frîncu, better known as Victoria Bezetti, Romanian classical soprano
