= Grecu =

Grecu is a surname. Notable people with the surname include:

- Constantin Grecu (born 1988), Romanian footballer
- Dan Grecu (1950–2024), Romanian gymnast
- Mihai Grecu (1916–1998), Moldovan painter
- Vlad Grecu (born 1959), Moldovan writer
