= Szász =

Szász or Szasz is an ethnonymic surname literally meaning "Saxon" in Hungarian. Notable people with the surname include:

- Emese Szász, Hungarian épée fencer
- Endre Szász, Hungarian graphic artist
- János Szász, Hungarian film director
- János Saxon-Szász, Hungarian painter
- Kitti Szász, Hungarian freestyle football world champion
- Otto Szász, Hungarian mathematician
- Robert Szasz, American real estate developer
- Thomas Szasz, Hungarian-American psychiatrist
- Tibor Szász, Hungarian classical pianist
