= Vācietis =

Vācietis (feminine: Vāciete) is a Latvian ethnonymic surname literally meaning "German person". Notable people with the surname include:

- Jukums Vācietis (1873–1938), Latvian Soviet military commander
- Liene Vāciete, Latvian footballer
- Mārtiņš Vācietis (1873–1945), general of the Latvian Armed Forces, Minister of War of Latvia
- Ojārs Vācietis (1933–1983), Latvian writer
