= Arnaoutis =

Arnaoutis, Arnautis, or Arnauti is a Greek surname literally meaning "Arnaut", i.e., "Albanian".

- Anatasios Arnaouti
- Dimitrios Arnaoutis
- Mike Arnaoutis
- Niko Arnautis

== See also ==
- Arnaut (given name)
- Arnauti (disambiguation)
