= Vlahos =

Vlahos or Vlachos (Greek: Βλάχος [ˈvlaxo̞s]), feminine: Vlahou, is a Greek surname, meaning Vlach.

The surname Vlahos/Vlachos may refer to:

- Alexander Vlahos, Welsh actor, known for playing Mordred on Merlin
- Anatole Vlachos, Greek chess grandmaster
- Eros Vlahos, English actor, known from Game of Thrones
- Helen Vlachos, Greek journalist and newspaper editor in the 60's, daughter of Georgios
- Dionisios Vlachos, American Professor of chemical engineering
- Georgios Vlachos, Greek journalist, creator of Kathimerini, a daily newspaper in Greece
- Hierotheos Vlachos (born 1945), Greek Orthodox metropolitan and theologian
- Leesa Vlahos, Australian former politician
- Michalis Vlachos, Greek footballer
- Petro Vlahos, American engineer, bluescreen/special effects pioneer
- Terpsichori Chryssoulaki-Vlachou, Greek WWII resistance member
- Tony Vlachos, winner of Survivor: Cagayan and Survivor: Winners at War
- Vangelis Vlachos, Greek footballer
- William Vlachos, American football player
- Zachary Vlahos, American Olympic rower

== See also ==
- Volokh (disambiguation)
- Wallach (disambiguation)
