= Litvinov =

Litvinov or Litvinoff (Russian: Литви́нов) is a Russian surname derived from the term Litvin, meaning Lithuanian person (Litva/Литвa). The female form of this surname is Litvinova (Russian: Литви́нова).

Notable persons with that name include:

== Litvinov ==
- Alexander Litvinov (1853–1932), Russian general in the Imperial Russian Army and the Red Army
- Venya D'rkin (stage name – real name Alexander Litvinov, 1970–1999), bard musician, artist, and storyteller
- David Litvinoff (AKA David Litvinov, 1928–1975), consultant for the British film industry who traded on his knowledge of the low life of the East End of London
- Dmitry Litvinov (1854–1929), Russian botanist
- Emanuel Litvinoff (1915–2011), British writer and editor
- Eugene Litvinov (1950–2020), American engineer
- Ivy Low Litvinov (1889–1977), English-Russian writer and translator
- Juri Litvinov (born 1978), Kazakhstani figure skater
- Maxim Litvinov (1876–1951), Soviet diplomat
- Pavel Litvinov (born 1940), Soviet physicist, writer, and human rights supporter
- Sergey Litvinov (disambiguation), several persons
- Victor Litvinov (1910–1983), Russian aircraft designer
- Vitali Litvinov (born 1970), Russian former footballer

== Litvinova ==
- Elizaveta Litvinova (1845–1919), Russian mathematician
- Larisa Litvinova (1918–1997), World War II bomber navigator and Hero of the Soviet Union
- Lyudmila Litvinova (born 1985), Russian sprinter and Olympic medallist
- Natalia Litvinova (born 1986), Argentinian writer, editor, poet and translator
- Renata Litvinova (born 1967), Russian actress
