= Karjalainen =

Karjalainen ("Karelian") is a Finnish surname. Notable people with the surname include:

- Ahti Karjalainen (1907–1986), Finnish composer
- Ahti Karjalainen (1923–1990), Finnish politician and former prime minister
- Anniina Karjalainen, Finnish singer
- Elina Karjalainen (1927–2006), Finnish journalist and author
- Hanna Karjalainen (b. 1980), Finnish actress
- Heikki Karjalainen (1883–1938), Finnish educator and politician
- Henri Karjalainen (b. 1986), Finnish racing driver
- Ida Karjalainen (b. 1997), Finnish ice hockey player
- Jari Karjalainen (b. 1967), Finnish singer
- Jere Karjalainen (b. 1992), Finnish ice hockey player
- Joni Karjalainen (b. 1991), Finnish ice hockey player
- Jouko Karjalainen (b. 1956), Finnish skier
- J. (Jukka) Karjalainen (b. 1957), Finnish singer
- Kastehelmi Karjalainen (1911–1973), Finnish artist
- Kimmo Karjalainen, Finnish musician
- Kristina Karjalainen (b. 1989), Estonian-Finnish model and Miss Estonia 2013
- Kustaa Fredrik Karjalainen (1871–1919), Finnish linguist and explorer
- Kyösti Karjalainen (b. 1967), a Swedish ice hockey player (of Finnish descent) for Los Angeles Kings
- Lasse Karjalainen (b. 1974), Finnish footballer
- Markku Karjalainen (b. 1966), Finnish wheelchair curler
- Matti Antero Karjalainen (1946–2010), Finnish speech processing researcher and inventor
- Miro Karjalainen (b. 1996), Finnish ice hockey player
- Olli-Pekka Karjalainen (b. 1980), Finnish hammer thrower
- Osmo Karjalainen (1940–2013), Finnish cross-country skier
- Paavo Karjalainen (1904–1978), Finnish journalist and politician
- Pekka Karjalainen, Finnish film director and sound producer
- Petra Karjalainen (b. 1969), Finnish actress
- Rasmus Karjalainen (b. 1996), Finnish footballer
- Riitta Karjalainen (b. 1968), Finnish orienteering and ski-orienteering competitor
- Sampo Karjalainen (b. 1977), one of the founders of Habbo Hotel
- Sari Karjalainen (b. 1968), Finnish wheelchair curler and Paralympian
- Sini Karjalainen (b. 1999), Finnish ice hockey player
- Tapio Karjalainen (b. 1939), Finnish politician
- Toni Karjalainen (b. 1979), Finnish golfer
