= Tătărășeni =

Tătărășeni may refer to:

- Tătărășeni, a village in Pleșeni Commune, Cantemir district, Moldova
- Tătărășeni, a village in Havârna Commune, Botoșani County, Romania
- Tătărășeni, a Romanian name for Tarashany, Chernivtsi Oblast, Ukraine

== See also ==
- Tătaru (disambiguation)
- Tătărești (disambiguation)
- Tătărăștii (disambiguation)
