= Arnauti =

Arnauti may refer to:

- Arnauts (Arnauti in Balkan Slavic languages), Ottoman-era ethnonym of Albanians
- Arnauti (Zenica), a village in Bosnia and Herzegovina
- Arnauti, Bulgaria, a village in Bulgaria, known after 1934 as Paisiy
- Abdul-Kader Arnauti, 20th-century Albanian scholar

== See also ==
- Arnaouti, an islet in Greece
