= Kalmykov =

Kalmykov (Russian: Калмыков) is a Slavic masculine surname, its feminine counterpart is Kalmykova. It is most common in Belarus, Russia and Ukraine. It was a satirical name given to Slavs who visited or lived in Kalmykia (a republic of Russia) to trade goods. It was also common amongst Slavic Cossacks.

- Anna Kalmykova (born 2008), Russian artistic gymnast
- Ivan Kalmykov (1890–1920), Ataman of the Ussuri Cossacks during the Russian Civil War.
- Maria Kalmykova (born 1978), Russian basketball player
- Natalia Kalmykova, Ukrainian politician
- Sergey Kalmykov (1891–1967), Russian painter, draughtsman and writer
- Tatyana Kalmykova (born 1990), Russian race walker
- Vadim Kalmykov, Ukrainian Paralympic track and field athlete
