= Suomalainen (surname) =

Origin
- Language: Finnish
- Meaning: "Finn"
- Region of origin: Finland

Other names
- Variant form: Suominen

Suomalainen is a Finnish surname. Notable people with the surname include:

- Aapeli Suomalainen (1866–1932), Finnish politician
- Jacobus Finno (real name Jaakko Suomalainen; c. 1540–1588), Finnish priest and rector
- Juho Suomalainen (1868–1941), Finnish politician
- Kari Suomalainen (1920–1999), Finnish cartoonist
- Paavo Suomalainen (1907–1976), Finnish zoologist and physiologist
- Tuomo Suomalainen (1931–1988), Finnish architect
- Olavi Suomalainen (born 1947), Finnish marathon runner
- Roope Suomalainen (born 1973), Finnish sailor
- Piia Suomalainen (born 1984), Finnish tennis player

== See also ==
- Suominen
