= Jacques Le Fèvre =

French Roman Catholic theologian and controversialist

Jacques Le Fèvre (b. at Lisieux towards the middle of the seventeenth century; d. 1 July 1716, in Paris) was a French Roman Catholic theologian and controversialist.

== Life ==
He became archdeacon of Lisieux and vicar-general of the Archbishopric of Bourges. In 1674 he received a doctorate in theology from the Sorbonne.

== Works ==
His works are the following:

- Entretiens d'Eudoxe et d' Euchariste sur les histoires de l'arianisme et des iconoclastes du P. Maimbourg (Paris, 1674). The first of these dialogues was condemned and burned.
- Motifs invincibles pour convaincre ceux de la religion prétendue réformée (Paris, 1682), in which Le Fèvre endeavours to show that there is fundamental agreement between Catholic and Protestant teachings, the differences being of slight importance and mostly verbal. These conciliatory views were attacked by Antoine Arnauld, and, in answer, Le Fèvre wrote Réplique a M. Arnauld pour la défense du livre des motifs invincibles (1685).

Amongst Le Fèvre's other works are

- Conférence avec un ministre touchant les causes de la separation des protestants (Paris, 1685)
- Instructions pour confirmer les nouveaux convertis dans la foi de l'église (Paris, 1686)
- Recueil de tout ce qui s'est fait pour et contre les protestants en France (Paris, 1686)
- Lettres d'un docteur sur ce qui se passe dans les assemblées de la faculté de théologie de Paris (Cologne, 1700). These letters were published anonymously when the work of the Jesuit Father Louis le Comte, "Mémoires sur la Chine", was referred to the faculty of theology.

To Father Jacques-Philippe Lallemant, who had defended his confrère in the Journal historique des assemblées tenues en Sorbonne, Le Fèvre replied in his Anti-journal historique ...; and he also produced Animadversions sur l'histoire ecclésiastique du P. Noël Alexandre, the first volume of which was printed at Rouen without date about 1680; it was seized and destroyed, and the other volumes were not published.
