= Lībietis =

Lībietis feminine: Lībiete is a Latvian ethnonymic surname literally meaning "Liv"/"Livonian". Notable people with the surname include:

- Jānis Lībietis(1885–1946), Latvian doctor, a signatory of the memorandum of the Central Council of Latvia
- Kārlis Lībietis (1846–1904), Latvian doctor, creator of Latvian medical terminology
- Kristaps Lībietis, Latvian biathlete
- Miķelis Lībietis, Latvian tennis player
