= Aistė =

- Gender: Female
- Language: Lithuanian
- Name day: 19 April, 10 August

Origin
- Origin: From the name of the Baltic tribe of the Aesti, mentioned by the Roman historian Tacitus.
- Region of origin: Lithuania

Aistė is a Lithuanian feminine given name.

People bearing the name Aistė include:

- Aistė Diržiūtė, a Lithuanian actress
- Aistė Gedvilienė, a Lithuanian politician
- Aistė Pilvelytė, a Lithuanian singer
- Aistė Smilgevičiūtė, a Lithuanian singer

== See also ==
- Aistis
