= Tătărești =

Tătăreşti may refer to:

- Tătăreşti, a village in Viile Satu Mare Commune, Satu Mare County, Romania
- Tătăreşti, a commune in Cahul district, Moldova
- Tătăreşti, a commune in Străşeni district, Moldova

== See also ==
- Tătaru (disambiguation)
- Tătărășeni (disambiguation)
- Tătărăștii (disambiguation)
