= Ugrin Csák (disambiguation) =

Ugrin Csák (Hungarian: Csák nembeli Ugrin, Ugrin of Csák kindred) may refer to:

- Ugrin Csák (archbishop of Esztergom) (d. 1204)
- Ugrin Csák (archbishop of Kalocsa) (d. 1241)
- Ugrin Csák (archbishop of Split) (d. 1248)
- Ugrin Csák, judge royal and Hungarian oligarch (d. 1311)
