= Kun (surname) =

Kun is a Hungarian ethnonymic surname literally meaning "Cuman". It is also a surname originating in Nauru, of other origin. Notable people with the surname include:

== Hungarian ==
- András Kun (1911–1945), Franciscan priest
- Béla Kun (1886–1938), Hungarian communist politician
- Éva Kun (1917–1982), Hungarian fencer
- Szilárd Kun (1935–1987), Hungarian sport shooter

== Nauran ==
- Roland Kun (b. 1970), Nauruan politician
- Ruben Kun (1942–2014), President of Nauru (1996–1997)
- Russ Kun (b. 1975), President of Nauru (2022–2023)
- Russell Kun, Nauruan politician

== See also ==
- Kuhn
