= Lenormand =

Lenormand or Le Normand is a surname. Notable people with the surname include:

- Henri-René Lenormand (1882–1951), French playwright
- Louis-Sébastien Lenormand (1757–1837), French physicist, inventor and pioneer in parachuting
- Marie Anne Lenormand (1772–1843), French professional fortune-teller for more than 40 years, famous during the Napoleonic era
- René Lenormand (1846–1932), French composer, father of Henri-René Lenormand
- Robin Le Normand (born 1996), French-born Spanish footballer
- Stéphane Lenormand, French politician
- Théo Le Normand (born 2000), French footballer, younger brother of Robin Le Normand

== See also ==
- Lenormant, a surname
- Le Normand de Bretteville family
- Johann Kaspar Hechtel, who designed a deck of playing cards upon which Lenormand fortune-telling cards are modelled
