= Madžar =

Madžar is a South Slavic surname, literally meaning "Hungarian". Notable people with the surname include:

- Aleksandar Madžar (musician) (born 1968), Serbian pianist
- Aleksandar Madžar (soccer) (born 1978), Montenegrin football manager
