= Sergey Litvinov =

Sergey Litvinov may refer to:

- Sergey Litvinov (athlete, born 1958) (1958–2018), Russian hammer thrower
- Sergey Litvinov (athlete, born 1986), Russian hammer thrower, son of the above
