= Lenormant =

Lenormant is a French surname. Notable people with the surname include:

- Charles Lenormant (1802–1859), French archaeologist
- François Lenormant (1837–1883), French assyriologist and archaeologist

== See also ==
- Lenormand, a surname
