= Andrei Sârbu =

Moldovan painter

- Born: 6 December 1950; Chișinău, Moldavian SSR
- Died: 14 April 2000 (aged 49); Chișinău, Moldova
- Known for: Painting
- Movement: Pop Art, Photorealism

Andrei Sârbu (born 6 December 1950 in Chișinău – died 14 April 2000 in Chișinău) was a Moldovan painter who contributed to the introduction of a modern approach to painting in Moldova. Known for his non-figurative works, Pop Art series and Photorealism.

== Life ==
Between 1963 and 1966 Andrei Sârbu studied at the A.V. Sciusev Art School followed by three years of study at 'Valentin Serov' College in Leningrad. Due to material hardships he was constrained to abandon his studies. Nevertheless, the artist's stay in Leningrad gave him the opportunity to familiarize himself with a wider context of modern art. Sârbu pursued his studies in Tallinn from 1966 to 1968, followed by his activity in the workshop of the renowned painter Mihai Grecu.

== Works ==
In 1968 Andrei Sârbu exhibited " Geranium from parents' home" at the National Museum of Art in Chișinău and started to work as a designer and painter of theatrical scenery at the "Luceafarul" theater in Chișinău.

In the 1970s, Sârbu embraced the technique of collage, which can be seen in works such as "Clock-1" and "Clock-2". The work "Projection" (1976–77) is a vivid example of the artist's use of the pictorial language of Pop Art. Elements such as cinema tape, sunflowers and quinces became his trademarks and were closely associated with his still lives.

The "Reflexes" series (1987–89) are highly representative of Andrei Sârbu's artistic maturity. The artist's later use of the pictorial language of Op-Art, shows the influence of the French painter Victor Vasarely.

Through the efforts of Marat Ghelman Andrei Sârbu was able to exhibit his works in art galleries in Moscow. The influence of Abstract Expressionism, Suprematism and De Stijl can de detected in his work from this period.

In the 1990s Andrei Sârbu devoted his attention to his native land's history through the series of paintings "Archeology" and the project "Archeo" sponsored by the Soros Foundation Moldova. Traditional themes found a modern pictorial expression in these series. In 1999 Andrei Sârbu was awarded a scholarship for excellence by the same institution.

The artist's deteriorating health prevented him from organising exhibition titled "Anno-Timpuri", which was presented to the public by wife, Antonina Sârbu. Andrei Sârbu died on April 14, 2000, in Chișinău.

Throughout his artistic career, Andrei Sârbu preferred to paint landscapes, still lives and non-figurative compositions. Works from series such as "Quinces", "Apples" and "Sunflower" show the artist's preference for these themes.

Andrei Sârbu is one of the few uncompromising artists from Moldova who refused to cooperate with the totalitarian Soviet regime. Although his incorruptibility has profoundly marked his human condition, it brought him recognition from his colleagues. He is undoubtedly one of Moldova's most appreciated modern artists.
