= Suominen =

Origin
- Language: Finnish
- Region of origin: Finland

Suominen is a Finnish surname of Virtanen type derived as "Suomi" "Finland" plus suffix -nen. Notable people with the surname include:

- Ilkka Suominen (1939–2022), Finnish politician
- Kim Suominen (born 1969), Finnish footballer
- Tuomas Suominen (born 1984), Finnish ice hockey player
- Veikko Suominen (1948–1978), Finnish ice hockey player

== See also ==
- Suominen Corporation
- Suomalainen
