= Virolainen =

Virolainen or Virolaynen is a Finnish surname meaning "an Estonian". Notable people with the surname include:

- Anne-Mari Virolainen (born 1965), Finnish politician
- Daria Virolaynen (born 1989), Russian biathlete
- Johannes Virolainen (1914–2000), Finnish politician
- Roman Virolainen, Belarusian cross-country skier
- Aleksi "Aleksib" Virolainen, Finnish professional Counter-Strike player
