= Srb (surname) =

Srb (Czech feminine: Srbová) is a Czech and Slovak language surname, literally meaning 'Serb'. Notable people with the surname include:

- Daniel Srb (born 1964), Croatian politician
- Josef Srb-Debrnov (1836–1904), Czech music historian and writer
- Manfred Srb (1941–2022), Austrian politician
- Renata Srbová (born 1972), Czech sailor
- Tereza Srbova (born 1983), Czech actress, writer, and model
