= Tătaru River =

Tătaru River may refer to:

- Tătaru, a tributary of the Buzăiel in Brașov County, Romania
- Tătaru, a tributary of the Ialomița in Dâmbovița County, Romania
