= Slovák =

Slovák, meaning "Slovak" in the Slovak language, is a surname. Notable persons with that surname include:

- Jozef Slovák (born 1951), Slovak serial killer
- Ladislav Slovák (1909–1999), Slovak conductor
- Samuel Slovák (born 1975), Slovak footballer
- Štěpán Slovák (born 1998), Czech politician
- Tomáš Slovák (born 1983), Slovak ice hockey player
