= Aapeli Suomalainen =

Finnish politician

Aapeli Suomalainen (29 January 1866 – 19 September 1932) was a Finnish miller and politician, born in Savonranta. He was a Member of the Parliament of Finland from 1907 to 1908, representing the Social Democratic Party of Finland (SDP).
