= Sârbi =

Sârbi may refer to the following places in Romania:

- Sârbi, Bihor, a commune in Bihor County
- Sârbi, a village in Hălmăgel Commune, Arad County
- Sârbi, a village in Podu Turcului Commune, Bacău County
- Sârbi, a village in Vlăsinești Commune, Botoșani County
- Sârbi, a village in Nicorești Commune, Galați County
- Sârbi, a village in Ilia Commune, Hunedoara County
- Sârbi, a village in Budeşti Commune, Maramureș County
- Sârbi, a village in Fărcașa Commune, Maramureș County
- Sârbi, a village in Sâg Commune, Sălaj County
- Sârbi, a village in Banca Commune, Vaslui County
- Sârbi, a village in Șușani Commune, Vâlcea County
- Sârbi, a village in Țifești Commune, Vrancea County
- Sârbi (Mureș), a tributary of the Mureș in Hunedoara County
- Sârbi (Valea Neagră), a tributary of the Valea Neagră in Neamț County

== See also ==
- Sarbi (disambiguation)
