= Orosz =

Orosz is a Hungarian language surname, which means "Ruthenian", derived from the Turkish urus, which in turn derived from the Russian Rusak ("Russian"). Rusak originates from a Scandinavian term for "oarsman" or "rower", referring to early Rus who rowed their ships inland from the Baltic sea. The name may refer to:

- Atanáz Orosz (born 1960), Hungarian Greek-Catholic bishop
- Corneliu Oros (born 1950), Romanian volleyball player
- Csaba Orosz (born 1971), Slovak sprint canoer
- Ferenc Orosz (born 1969), Hungarian football player
- Helma Orosz (born 1953), German politician
- István Orosz (born 1951), Hungarian artist
- Joe Oros (1916–2012), American automobile designer
- Károly Orosz (born 1945), Hungarian ice hockey player
- Márk Orosz (born 1989), Hungarian football player
- Pál Orosz (1934–2014), Hungarian football coach
- Péter Orosz (born 1981), Hungarian football player
- Petro Oros (1917–1953) Ukrainian Greek-Catholic bishop
- Rozalia Oros (born 1964), Romanian fencer
- Tom Orosz (born 1959), American football player
- Yaroslav Oros (born 1959), Ukrainian writer

== See also ==
- Orosháza
