= Petia Arnaudova =

Bulgarian-American physician

Petia Arnaudova (Bulgarian: Петя Арнаудова) is a physician and author of medical books. She has three specialties, internal medicine, rheumatology, and pharmacology, as well as a Doctor of Science degree and a professorship in medicine. She is Bulgarian and American citizen currently living in Chicago, United States and Sofia, Bulgaria.

Arnaudova has more than thirty years of clinical, scientific and educational practice, mainly at Medical University of Sofia, Bulgaria. She has also been:

- Deputy Minister of Health for the Ministry of Health of Bulgaria (1994–1995)
- Vice-President of the joint Greek-Bulgarian medical company Biocheck based in Sofia, Bulgaria (1996–1997)
- Director of the Department of Clinical Research at the American pharmaceutical company Viral Genetics, Inc. in Pasadena, CA, USA (1999–2001)
- Senior Editor of Cardioscript International, based in Salt Lake City, UT, USA – a service for translating, editing and revising scientific medical manuscripts to meet the standards of American scientific publications (1998–2006).

== Scientific works ==
- Petia Arnaudova. Concise Medical Encyclopedia for Everyone (Bulgarian: Малка медицинска енциклопедия за всеки). 411 pages. Iztok-Zapad, Sofia, 2013. ISBN 6191522967.
- Petia Arnaudova. Terminologia Medica – Polyglotta, Eponymica et Acronymica (Title in Latin) (Bulgarian: Медицинска терминология – полиглотна, епонимна и акронимна). 748 pages, Medizina i Fizkultura, Sofia, 2012.
- Petia Arnaudova. Congenital Anomalies in Clinical Practice (Bulfarian: Вродени аномалии в клиничната практика). 305 pages. Medizina i Fizkultura, Sofia, 2010. ISBN 9789544202804.
- Petia Arnaudova. A Popular Medical Dictionary, or How to Understand Doctor-Speak (Bulgarian: Популярен медицински речник или как да разберем какво си говорят лекарите): 354 pages, Medizina i Fizkultura, Sofia, 2008. ISBN 9789544202644.
- Petia Arnaudova. Medical Acronyms, Abbreviations, and Symbols in 5 languages – Latin, Bulgarian, Russian, English, German (Bulgarian: Медицински акроними, съкращения и символи от 5 езика). 450 pages, Medizina i Fizkultura, Sofia, 2008. ISBN 9789544202699.
- Petia Arnaudova. Eponyms in Internal Medicine (Bulgarian: Епонимни термини в морфологията, нозологията и клиниката на вътрешните болести): 376 pages, Medizina i Fizkultura, Sofia, 2005. ISBN 9544202366.
- Petia Arnaudova. Nova Terminologia Medica Polyglotta et Eponymica (Title in Latin) (in 7 languages – Latin, Bulgarian, Russian, English, French, German, Spanish): 738 pages. 1st Ed., 2003; 2nd Ed., 2005. Medizina i Fizkultura, Sofia.
- Georgie Arnaudov, Petia Arnaudova. Terminologia Medica Polyglotta (in 6 languages): 3rd Ed., 1090 pages, Medizina i Fizkultura, Sofia, 1992. ISBN 9544200126.
- Georgie Arnaudov, Petia Arnaudova. Pharmacotherapy (Bulgarian: Лекарствена терапия): 6th Ed., 976 pages, Medizina i Fizkultura, Sofia, 1984.
