= Adam Magyar =

Hungarian photographer

- Born: 1972 (age 53–54); Debrecen, Hungary
- Known for: Photography and video art
- Notable work: Stainless, Urban Flow, Squares, Array
- Website: magyaradam.com

Adam Magyar (born 1972) is a Hungarian photographer and video artist.

== Life and work ==
Adam Magyar was born in Hungary in 1972. He began taking pictures in his late twenties, when he started wandering Asian cities capturing their street life in images of Indian street vendors, wandering holy men, and students in an exclusive Himalayan school. Obsessed with finding innovative new uses for digital technology, Magyar's work quickly evolved from conventional documentary photography to the radically experimental and surreal.

One of Magyar's inventions is inserting motion into still images. In his attempt to communicate the interface of time's flow in the world's modern metropolises, he developed techniques to capture, on a single visual plane, disjointed, fragmented images of parts of an individual or group on a crowded street. A theme that recurs throughout much of his body of work is based on interlinking distinct ideas and techniques that focus on revealing the inherent beauty found in the everyday. His vision and technical abilities led him to modify and develop his own hardware and software. In his Urban Flow and Stainless works he uses the slit-scan photography technique, known also for use in photo finish cameras, as well as in other, often industrial, techniques. He uses a high-speed camera in his video series entitled Stainless, in which he captures densely populated urban areas at extremely high speeds.

Magyar spoke at several image festivals and conferences including TEDSalon Berlin, Bits of Knowledge, Adam Magyar: Photographing the Unfolding of Daily Life, Admiralspalast, Berlin, Germany (2014), TEDxGateway, Adam Magyar, Mumbai, India (2014), PopTech: Pop Casts, Adam Magyar: Photos of Time, Camden, ME (2013)

== Solo exhibitions ==
- 2024 Stainless, - The Museum of Fine Arts, Houston, USA
- 2024 Matter, - Eskenazi Museum of Art, Bloomington, USA
- 2023 Matter, - ToBe Gallery, Budapest, Hungary
- 2022 Urban Times, - Stephen Bulger Gallery, Toronto, Canada
- 2019 Midnight Moment - Times Square Arts, New York, NY
- 2019 Stainless, Museo Casa Grande, Hidalgo, Mexico
- 2018 Stainless, B24 Gallery, Debrecen, Hungary
- 2017 Stainless, Alexanderplatz, 3 channel video installation, Museum of Fine Arts Houston, Houston, TX
- 2015 Kontinuum, Julie Saul Gallery, New York, NY
- 2013 Kontinuum, Opiom Gallery, Opio, France
- 2013 Kontinuum, Griffin Museum of Photography, Winchester, MA
- 2013 Kontinuum, Houston Center for Photography, Houston, TX
- 2013 Kontinuum, Light Work, Syracuse, NY
- 2012 Kontinuum, Faur Zsófi Gallery, Budapest, Hungary
- 2011 Underworld, BSA @ CHB, Berlin, Germany
- 2011 Beyond Perspective, Karin Weber Gallery, Hong Kong
- 2006 Comearound, Retorta Gallery, Budapest, Hungary
- 2005 TaxiJam, Miro Photo Gallery, Budapest, Hungary
- 2002 Kashi Vishwanath Express, Miro Photo Gallery, Budapest, Hungary

== Group exhibitions ==
- 2019 Preparing for darkness #vol3, Selected artists @ Kühlhaus, Berlin
- 2019 Al Obour, Saudi Art Council, Jeddah, Saudi Arabia
- 2018 L’équipe du Festival Locomotion, Nancy, France
- 2018 Preparing for darkness #vol2, Selected artists @ Kühlhaus, Berlin
- 2018 Polylux, Mecklenburgisches Künstlerhaus Schloss Plüschow, Germany
- 2018 Preparing for darkness, Selected artists at Kühlhaus, Berlin
- 2017 Immanence, Pictura, Groningen, Netherlands
- 2017 Accentuated Reality, Faur Zsofi Gallery, Budapest, Hungary
- 2016 Envisioning the Future!, Saitama Triennale 2016, Japan
- 2016 Impact: Abstractions and Experiment in Hungarian Photography, Alma, New York, NY
- 2016 Infinite Pause: Photography and Time, Museum of Fine Arts Houston, TX
- 2016 Langoureusement, Association Light Matter, Metz, France
- 2016 Photography and Film Constructs, Ringling College Willis Smith Gallery, Sarasota, FL
- 2015 Laps, La Carreau de Cergy, Cergy, France
- 2015 Public Eye: 175 Years of Sharing Photograph, New York Public Library, New York, NY.
- 2015 Night on Earth, BSA @ CHB, Berlin, Germany
- 2015 Ideas City Conference, New Museum, New York, NY
- 2015 Look3, Festival of the Photograph, Charlottesville, VA
- 2015 Subway, Stephen Bulger Gallery, Toronto, Canada
- 2014 UNKNOWN: Pictures of Strangers, Transformer Station, Cleveland, OH
- 2014 Public Eye: 175 Years of Sharing Photograph, New York Public Library, New York, NY.
- 2014 Urban Spirit, curated by Dr. Katia David and Ágnes Lőrincz, Galerie Wedding, Berlin, Germany
- 2014 Megapolis, Eres Foundation, Munich, Germany
- 2014 METRO, Reinier Gerritsen, Adam Magyar, David Molander, Julie Saul Gallery, New York, NY
- 2014 Trailed Away, Gallery Soso, Seoul, South Korea
- 2014 Lapse, curated by Djeff and Fanny Serain, Vasarely Foundation, Aix-en-Provence, France
- 2013 Hungarian Art Photography in the New Millennium, Hungarian National Gallery, Budapest, Hungary
- 2013 Love Will Destroy Us In The End, BSA at Art Suites Gallery, Istanbul, Turkey
- 2013 Light of Day, Transformer Station, Cleveland, OH
- 2012 Breaking God’s Heart, BSA @ Liebkranz Galerie, Berlin, Germany
- 2012 Helsinki Photography Biennial, Helsinki City Museum, Finland
- 2011 Life as it seems, Faur ZSofi Gallery, Budapest, Germany
- 2011 Lens Culture International Exposure Awards:31 Contemporary Photographers, Gallery 291, San Francisco; Speos Gallery, Paris; VII Dumbo, New York, NY
- 2011 Young European Landscape BSA @ CHB, Berlin; BSA @ Galerie Wolfsen, Aalborg, Denmark
- 2011 Flashart, Whart, Toulouse, France
- 2010 Photographie Hongroise Contemporaine, Faur ZSofi Gallery - Institut Hongrois, Paris, France
- 2010 Separated by Daily Life, Rhubarb East at Mailbox, Birmingham, AL
- 2009 Defining Urban Life, Karin Weber Gallery, Hong Kong
- 2009 Art Sunday, Karin Weber Gallery, Hong Kong
- 2008 Jozsef Pecsi Scholarship Annual Exhibition, Hungarian House of Photography, Budapest, Hungary
- 2007 It depends on your point of view, Metro Gallery, Budapest, Hungary
- 2007 Bits, Bytes and Pixels, Island6, Shanghai, China
- 2007 Jozsef Pecsi Photography Scholarship Winners Exhibition, Hungarian Academy, Rome, Italy
- 2006 I Love LEDs, Island6, Shanghai, China
- 2006 Getting Along, Island6, Shanghai, China
- 2004 Press Photo Exhibition, Ethnographic Museum Budapest

== Collections ==
His work is included in several public collections including:

- Light Work, Syracuse, NY
- Museum of Fine Arts, Houston, TX
- Nelson-Atkins Museum of Art, Kansas City, MO
- New York Public Library, New York, NY

== Publications ==
- Contact Sheet 170: Adam Magyar, Light Work

== Scholarships and awards ==
- 2009 International Photography Award, 1st place in Fine Art - Collage subcategory for Squares, 1st place in Special - Aerial subcategory for Squares,
- 2006-2007 Jozsef Pecsi Scholarship,
- 2004 Grand Prize, Hungarian Press Photo
