= Frangos (surname) =

Frangos or Fragkos (Greek: Φράγκος) is a Greek surname. It means "Frank", referring to a Western European or a Roman Catholic person.

- Andreas-Dimitrios Frangos (born 1989), Greek volleyball player
- Athanasios Frangos (1864–1923), Greek general
- Frangoulis Frangos (born 1951), Greek general

== See also ==
- Frango
