= Cazacu =

Cazacu is a Romanian surname. Notable people with the surname include:

- Cabiria Andreian Cazacu (1928–2018), Romanian mathematician
- Cazacu Cazan (born 1958), Romanian ice hockey player
- Claudia Cazacu (born 1982), Romanian DJ, record producer, and remixer
- Petru Cazacu (1873–1956), Romanian politician
