= Georgi Arnaudov =

Bulgarian footballer

Personal information
- Date of birth: 31 May 1974 (age 52)
- Place of birth: Varna, Bulgaria
- Position: Goalkeeper

Senior career*
Years	Team	Apps	(Gls)
1993–2008	Spartak Varna	112	(0)
2008–2010	Chernomorets Byala	57	(0)
2010–2011	Spartak Varna	2	(0)
- * Club domestic league appearances and goals

Georgi Arnaudov (Bulgarian: Георги Арнаудов; born 31 May 1974) is a former Bulgarian professional footballer who played as a goalkeeper.
