= Rațiu =

Rațiu is a Romanian-language ethnonymic surname. It derives from the Hungarian-language term rác ("Rascian", a historical term for Serbs). Notable people with the surname include:

- the noble Rațiu family
  - Augustin Rațiu (1884–1970)
  - Basiliu Rațiu (1783–1870)
  - Ioan Rațiu (1828–1902)
  - Ion Rațiu (1917–2000), Romanian newspaper editor and politician
  - Mircea-Dimitrie Rațiu (1923–2011)
  - Nicolae Rațiu (1856–1932)
  - Tudor Ratiu (born 1950), Romanian-American mathematician
- Alin Rațiu, Romanian former football player
- Alexander Ratiu (1916–2002), Romanian Greek-Catholic priest
- Andrei Rațiu (born 1998), Romanian footballer
- Cosmin Rațiu, Romanian rugby union player
- Daniela Rațiu, Romanian handball player
- George-Adrian Ratiu, Romanian swimmer
- Miron Rațiu, Romanian conductor and music educator
- Tudor Ratiu, Romanian-American mathematician

== See also ==
- Rațiu, a village in Tășnad town, Satu Mare County, Romania
