= Anatole Vlachos =

Greek chess grandmaster (born 2002)

Personal information
- Born: February 11, 2002 (age 24) Paris, France

Chess career
- Country: France (until 2015); Greece (since 2015)
- Title: Grandmaster (2026)
- FIDE rating: 2514 (November 2026)
- Peak rating: 2514 (November 2026)

Anatole Vlachos is a Greek chess grandmaster.

== Chess career ==
In September 2019, he finished in second place at the Sevres Open rapid tournament, scoring 7.5/9 and defeating grandmaster Andrei Shchekachev.

In January 2024, he finished in second place at the Bois-Colombes Master Open A with a score of 7/9, behind winner Sankalp Gupta and ahead of third-place finisher Sergey Fedorchuk.

In December 2025, he won the Bois-Colombes Master Open A with an undefeated score of 7.5/9, finishing a full point ahead of the rest of the field.

He was awarded the Grandmaster title in 2026, after achieving his norms at the:

- 13th International Tournament of Palaiochora in July 2020
- Vezerkepzo GM tournament in November 2025
- French Team Championship Top 16 in June 2026
