= Türkmenoğlu (surname) =

Türkmenoğlu is a Turkish patronymic surname, meaning "Turkmen's son". As of 2014, there are 6,775 people with the surname Türkmenoğlu in Turkey, making it the 1,486th most common surname in the country.

People with the surname include:

- Ayşe Türkmenoğlu, Turkish lawyer and politician
- Kayhan Türkmenoğlu, Turkish politician
- Mahmut Türkmenoğlu, Turkish politician
- Nihat Türkmenoğlu, Turkish Paralympian archer

== See also ==
- Türkmen (surname), another Turkish surname with a similar etymology
- Türkmenoğlu, for other uses
