= Heikki Karjalainen =

Finnish educator and politician (1883–1938)

Heikki Karjalainen (20 May 1883 – 27 April 1938) was a Finnish educator and politician, born in Kempele. He was a member of the Parliament of Finland from 1927 to 1929, representing the National Progressive Party. He was the mayor of Oulu from 1931 until his death in 1938. He was a presidential elector in the 1925, 1931 and 1937 presidential elections.
