= Jacques-Philippe Lallemant =

French Jesuit

Jacques-Philippe Lallemant (c. 1660, Saint-Valery-sur-Somme – 1748) was a French Jesuit, of whom little is known beyond his writings. He took part in the discussion on the Chinese rites, and wrote the Journal historique des assemblées tenues en Sorbonne pour condamner les Mémoires de la Chine (Paris, 1700), a defense of his confrère Louis le Comte against the Sorbonnist, Jacques Lefèvre.

In his “Histoire des Contestations sur la Diplomatique” (Paris, 1708) he sided with the Jesuits Jean Hardouin and Papebroch against the Benedictine Mabillon.

== Works ==
Lallemant's principal works are against the Jansenists. These include:

- Le Père Quesnel séditieux dans ses Réflexions sur le Nouveau Testament (Brussels, 1704)
- Jansénius condamné par l'Eglise par lui-même, par ses défenseurs et par St-Augustin (Brussels, 1705)
- Le véritable esprit des nouveaux disciples de St-Augustin (Brussels, 1706-7)
- Les Hexaples ou les six colonnes sur la Constitution Unigenitus (Amsterdam, 1714), followed by a number of pamphlets in its defense
- Entretiens au sujet des affaires présentes par rapport à la religion (Paris, 1734–1743).

In response to Pasquier Quesnel's Réflexions morales, Lallemant composed, in collaboration with other Jesuits (e.g. Dominique Bouhours and Michel), Réflexions morales sur le Nouveau Testament traduit en français (Paris, 1713–25). This work was translated into many languages, and praised by Catholic commentators including François Fénelon and the “Revue Catholique”.

Other works by Lallemant include:

- Le Sens propre et littéral des Psaumes de David (Paris. 1709)
- L’Imitation de Jésus-Christ, traduction nouvelle (Paris, 1740)
- several dissertations in the Mémoires de Trévoux (August, 1713, and May, 1714)

The Jansenists attributed to him several writings, including:

- Mandement of M. de Vintimille contre les Nouvelles Ecclésiastiques (1732)
- a supplement to the Nouvelles Ecclésiastiques (1734-8)

== Original Sources ==
- Augustin de Backer and Carlos Sommervogel, Bibliothèque des Ecrivains de la Compagnie de Jesus, s. v.
- Joseph Marie Quérard, Auteurs pseudonymes et anonymes, s. v.
- Barbier, Dictionnaire des ouvrages anonymes.
