= Madar (surname) =

Madar is a surname of several possible origins. It particular, madár means "bird" in Hungarian, mađar or maďar means "Hungarian" in several Slavic languages. In Maghrebi Jewish it is a nickname of Arabic origin for a person who talks much. Notable people with the surname include:

- Chaim Madar, chief rabbi of Tunisia's Jewish community and writer
- Csaba Madar (born 1974) Hungarian footballetr
- Ede Mađar (1931–2005), Serbian gymnast
- Elmer Madar (1920–1972), American footballer
- Mickaël Madar, French former professional footballer
- Hawadle Madar 1939–2005, Somalian politician
- Olga Madar (1915–1996), American executive
- Veronika Madár, Hungarian actress
- Yam Madar (born 2000), Israeli professional basketball player
