= Venäläinen =

Venäläinen is a Finnish surname meaning "a Russian". Notable people with the surname include:

- Ilja Venäläinen (born 1980), Finnish football player
- Kati Venäläinen (born 1975; née Sundqvist), Finnish cross-country skier
- Sami Venäläinen (born 1981), Finnish ice hockey player
- Unto Venäläinen (born 1944), Finnish chess master
