= Livanos =

Livanos (Greek: Λιβανός) is a Greek surname. The feminine form is Livanou (Λιβανού). People with the surname include:

- Athina Mary Livanos (1929–1974), English-born Greek-French socialite and shipping heiress
- Eugenia Livanos (1927–1970), Greek socialite
- George P. Livanos (1926–1997), American-born Greek shipping magnate
- Konstantinos Livanos (born 2000), Greek cyclist
- Michalis Livanos, Greek politician
- Peter Livanos (born 1958), Greek shipping tycoon
- Spilios Livanos (born 1967), Greek politician
- Stavros G. Livanos (1891–1963), Greek shipowner

== See also ==
- SS Ioannis Livanos
