= Marianne Csaky =

Hungarian writer and sculptor

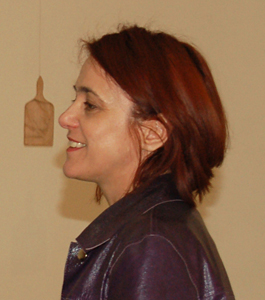
- Marianne Csaky
- Born: Budapest, Hungary
- Known for: sculptures, photography, installation art, painting

Marianne Csaky (born 1959, Budapest, Hungary) is a Hungarian writer and sculptor. Trained in arts as well as ethnography and philosophy, she started to exhibit her work in Budapest in 1989. Since the very start of her career Csáky has been known for her non-mainstream forms of expression, her unconventional and provocative images. She regularly publishes poems, essays and translations.

== Biography ==
A native of Hungary, Marianne Csaky currently lives and works in Budapest and Brussels, and has spent longer periods of time in Seoul, Korea, the United States, France and Germany as a resident artist.

== Works ==
Marianne Csaky works with various media: photo, painting, sculpture, embroidery, video and installation. In her juvenile works she exclusively used leather for her sculptures and 3D objects. In her early works - sculptures made out of pieces of waste wood and plaster - language, desire, subjectivity and the androgynous nature of soul and mind were in the focus of her interest (Aphrodite Urania, 1995, Feast, 1990). In this period of her career she was influenced by the works of ancient Greek philosophers, first of all Plato's Symposium. In these works she started to use the love scene, a depiction of sexual intercourse as a visual metaphor or rather metonymy of human subjectivity and the language of desire (Aphrodite Urania, Hands and Soles, 1995, Slanting Space, 1997).

Csáky has also created complex spatial constructions which modelled the shifting, alterable and unstable nature of our views, beliefs, judgements and first of all the unstable nature of our identity (Slanting Space). For instance, in 1997, she built a new slanting floor in Gallery 56, thereby using bodily instabilization for intellectual deconstruction. Chopping boards with carvings of scenes of sexual intercourse hung from the ceiling of the gallery, swinging and turning gently with the slightest movements of the air.

From 2000, her interest turned toward personal and small community history. These series of works (My Skins 2005, Time Leap 2007–8) are the appropriation of her family past, an experiment with the nature of memory and post memory work. In My Skins, a series of leather curtains and leather wall carpets with embossing and pencil drawing, she used swine leather again, referring to childhood memory. After the 56 revolution in Hungary Csáky's grandfather was compelled to live in a self-maintaining farm where he also produced animal hides. The pencil drawings on the leather are based on old family photographs from the artist's childhood.

The Time Leap series (Light Boxes, 2007–8, Stitched Photos, 2008) represent a complex construction of different layers of time and subjectivity. It is the documentation of the artist's efforts to displace records, deconstruct documents preserving personal memories, to rewrite the past, and, by doing so, change the present. In the case of Light Boxes the artist took colour shots of herself, and from the colour negatives she inserted her figure into old black-and-white negatives depicting her as a child. As a result, she appears twice in each of these negatives, in two different ages, then and now. She constructed an installation for these film negatives by making a wire frame and placing a mirror behind each negative at a 45-degree angle. This mirror reflects the light from a light-bulb fixed to the wall above the frame, and illuminates the scenes from behind, making the negative images visible.

The second group of works in the Time Leap series (Stitched Photos – Video Stills, 2008) are images depicting a lonely female figure (the artist) in a solitary state of sexual desire, situated in positions of love acts without the object of this desire appearing in the images. This is again an intervention in the past – or rather, an intervention of the past in the present. The still images are taken from video recordings taken by the artist, while the silk figures sewn on the images are from the same series of old family photos as the ones appearing in the light boxes. While the light boxes rewrite the past by placing the artist's present self in those images, in this series the opposite occurs: figures from family history appear in her present.

Madonna (2008) and Queen (2008) in Time Leap – Stitched Photos series also based on old negatives from the family collection depicting prearranged dressed up scenes. The “as if” perspective of family photos is also in the focus of Csaky's interest, the way people's actions and people themselves are arranged, made to pose and the way they use the images of the nature. She claims that family photos, in this sense, are depictions, explicit manifestations of desires for things that are not there or are not the way they should be. However artificial the image of the desires and feelings appearing in family photos might be, it is, in fact, real.
