= Nemchinov =

Nemchinov (masculine), Nemchinova (feminine) is a Russian-language patronymic surname, derived from the nickname nemchin, borrowed from Polish niemczyn for "German person". Notable people with the surname include:

- Natalia Nemchinova
- Oleh Nemchinov
- Sergei Nemchinov
- Vasily Nemchinov
- Vera Nemtchinova
