= Gruzinov =

Gruzinov, feminine: Gruzinova, is a Russian surname derived from the word gruzin ("Georgian"). Notable people with the surname include:

- Aleksandr Gruzinov (1873–1918), Russian military commander, artillerist
- Ilya Gruzinov (1781–1813), Russian professor of anatomy and physiology
- Ivan Gruzinov (1893–1942), Russian Soviet poet and critic.
- Gruzinov, a spy in the Vladimir Nabokov's novel Glory
- Yelena Gruzinova, Russian retired female race walker

== See also ==
- Gruzinsky
