= Roussos =

Roussos is a surname. Notable people with the surname include:

- Albert Roussos (born 1996), Greek footballer
- Demis Roussos (1946–2015), Greek singer, songwriter, and musician
- George Roussos (1915–2000), American comic book artist
- Mike Roussos (1926–1987), American football offensive tackle
