= Sergey Kalmykov =

Russian painter

- Сергей Калмыков
- Portrait by Leonid Leontiev, 1946
- Born: 6 October 1891; Samarkand, Russian Empire
- Died: 27 April 1967 (aged 75); Alma-Ata, Kazakhstan
- Known for: Painting; drawing; art critics

Sergey Ivanovich Kalmykov (Russian: Сергей Иванович Калмыков; 6 October 1891 – 27 April 1967) was a Soviet painter, draughtsman, and writer. Barely known during his art career and abandoned at the end of his life, he is currently regarded as one of the most important figures of the Russian avant-garde art, an author of over fifteen hundred of paintings, drawings, illustrations, theater decorations, and numerous writings. During his life Kalmykov has developed an original style of painting and draftsmanship that can be described as 'magical impressionism'.

His eccentric lifestyle matched the originality of his art works. He was walking on the streets wearing bright, burlesque dresses, had no furniture in his apartment except the piles of the newspapers bundled to resemble a bed, a table and some sort of chairs, and dedicated all his time and mental energy to produce the art works. He died in a psychiatric clinic where he was placed shortly before his death due to his presumed mental illness.

== Early life and studies ==
Sergey Kalmykov was born in October 1891 in the Central Asian city of Samarkand, then a part of the Russian Empire. Soon after his birth the family moved to Orenburg where he studied in a gymnasium. In 1909-1910 Kalmykov lived in Moscow where he attended the Moscow Art School (studio of Konstantin Yuon, and from late 1919 in St.Petersburg where he was a member of the art studios of Mstislav Dobuzhinsky and Kuzma Petrov-Vodkin. It is widely believed that it was Kalmykov who inspired Petrov-Vodkin to create his famous Bathing of a Red Horse painting.

== Orenburg Period ==
After the October Revolution in Russia Kalmykov returned to Orenburg where he worked as a decorator, lecturer, artist and art critic. From 1926 till 1928 he was a member of the Association of Artists of Revolutionary Russia (АХРР in Russian). In the beginning the early 1930s he was prop/decoration-maker for the so-called Traveling Opera headed by Fyodor Vazerskiy.

== Alma-Ata Period ==
In 1935 Sergey Kalmykov moved to Alma-Ata, then the capital of the Kazakh Soviet Socialist Republic, invited to work at the newly established Musical Theater of Alma-Ata, later reorganized into the Academic Theater of Opera and Ballet named after Abai. He worked with the theater until his retirement in 1950s [exact date is unknown], and created numerous decorations and art works for the theater performances.

Parade of the Kings, c. 1948, a sketch for a theater decoration

He also became increasingly known in the city due to his own art works, radically different from a social realism art style then dominant in the USSR. Some of his paintings were abstract and expressionistic, others were surrealistic, phantasmagorical. He experimented with the different shapes of the canvases (circles, triangles), and often embedded texts into his drawings and paintings.

He also self-published a few book-like volumes, made of sketches, drawings and his own texts, often written in an enigmatic and expressive manner. “The world is very sick. No surprise that only the Artists can rescue it”, wrote he in one of such books.

Kalmykov was often drawing on the streets and in the parks of Alma-Ata, and soon became a city legend because of his extravagant clothes (bright red beret, blue trousers with gold stripes, and a coat with the attached tin cans) and behavior. He was never selling his works, and only presented some of them to his friends and sometimes even to the strangers.

== Later years and death ==
After his retirement in 1962 Kalmykov experienced increasing financial difficulties, ate very poorly (allegedly his food ratio the late years consisted only bread and milk, and he didn’t have warm meals for months). Purportedly he suffered from mental illnesses, but no diagnostics or treatment was conducted during his life (posthumously he was diagnosed with schizophrenia by some of the local psychiatrists).

Shortly before his death Sergey Kalmykov was placed to a psychiatric clinic, where he died on April 27, 1967, from pneumonia aggravated by the extreme dystrophy. The place of his grave is not known.

The last self portrait by Sergey Kalmykov, 1966

== Commemoration and legacy ==
The total volume of art-works by Sergey Kalmykov is estimated around 1,500 pieces, of different format, although the exact number is not known, and estimates vary widely. The Art Museum named after Abylkhan Kasteev in Alma-Ata has more than one thousand art works of the artist in its archives, the largest collection known. Dozens of works are possessed by the Russian Museum in St.Petersburg and the Pushkin Museum in Moscow. Unknown number of Kalmykov’s works is also kept in various private collections, in Kazakhstan, Russia, the US, and Europe.

The very first small exhibition of the art works by Sergey Kalmykov was held already in end of 1968, by the Art Gallery named after Taras Shevchenko in Alma-Ata (the gallery was later reorganized into the Art Museum named after Abylkhan Kasteev).

In 1991 the Museum commemorated the 100th anniversary of Kalmykov’s birth with a small exhibition, and published the first album of his works.

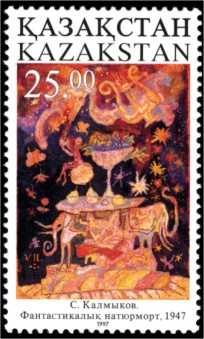
Post stamp with the artwork by Sergey Kalmykov, 1997

In 1997 the Republic of Kazakhstan issued a postage stamp with the painting by Sergey Kalmykov (denomination: 25 tenge).

Ten years later, in 2001, the same museum held the largest exhibition so far, commemorating the 110th anniversary of the artist, and displaying the art works from by private and public collections.

Alex Orlov, a collector of Russian origin from the US has reportedly established a foundation named after Sergey Kalmykov, and also published the first international edition of his work.

In 2006 the Republic of Kazakhstan celebrated the 115th anniversary of Sergey Kalmykov, and in 2008 issued a commemorative coin with his work (denomination: 500 tenge).

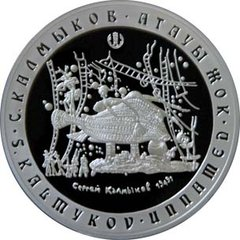
Commemorative coin with the artwork by Kalmykov, 2008

== Literature ==
Yury Dombrovsky, a Russian writer who also lived in Alma-Ata, described Sergey Kalmykov in his novel The Faculty of Useless Knowledge (Russian: Факультeт ненужных вещей) (1978)

Sergey Kalmykov is a main hero of the David Markish's novel The White Circle (Russian: Белый круг) (2004).
