= István Rusznyák =

Hungarian physician (1889–1974)

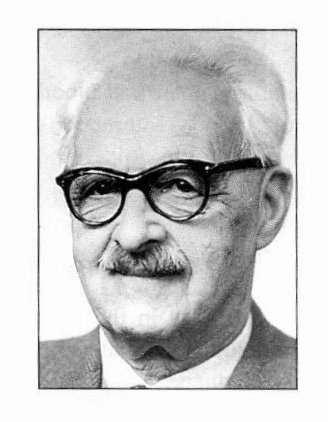
- Photo of István Rusznyák c. 1950
- Born: 22 January 1889; Budapest
- Died: 15 October 1974 (aged 85)
- Resting place: Farkasréti Cemetery, Budapest
- Awards: Lomonosov Gold Medal (1968)
- Scientific career
- Workplaces: University of Szeged

István Rusznyák (22 January 1889 – 15 October 1974) was a Hungarian physician. He was the President of the Hungarian Academy of Sciences between 1949 and 1970.

== Biography ==
Rusznyák came from a family of intellectuals in Budapest. In 1911 he got a diploma in medicine from the Budapest University of Medical Sciences. He worked in the Pathology Department. He fought in the First World War. In 1926, he was a private lecturer.

Between 1931 and 1944, he was a lecturer at the Department of Medicine of University of Szeged. In 1937/38, he was elected dean. With the start of the Second World War in 1944, he and his family were deported but returned from Austria. After the end of the Second World War, he worked as the Head of the Department of Internal Medicine.

In 1946, he was elected a full member of the Hungarian Academy of Sciences and was elected its president in 1949. In 1963, he retired as a university professor, but continued as the President of the Hungarian Academy of Sciences until 1970.

He remained an academic advisor from 1971 until his death on 15 October 1974. He is buried at Farkasréti Cemetery.

== Contributions ==
Along with Albert Szent-Györgyi, he discovered Vitamin P and proved that chemically it belongs to the flavones.

Cultural offices
Preceded by Zoltán Kodály	President of the Hungarian Academy of Sciences; 1949–1970	Succeeded by Tibor Erdey-Grúz
