= Charlie Lytwyn =

Scottish footballer

Personal information
- Date of birth: 1 October 1964 (age 62)
- Place of birth: Edinburgh, Scotland
- Position: Forward

Senior career*
Years	Team	Apps	(Gls)
1984–1985	Hibernian	0	(0)
1985–1986	Falkirk	15	(5)
1986–1987	Brechin City	26	(4)
1987–1988	Berwick Rangers	19	(3)
1988–1990	Alloa Athletic	56	(24)
1990–1992	East Stirlingshire	47	(21)
1992–1993	Stenhousemuir	17	(3)
- Bonnyrigg Rose Athletic
Total		180	(60)
- * Club domestic league appearances and goals

Charlie Lytwyn (born 1 October 1964) is a Scottish former professional footballer who played as a forward.

== Career ==
Born in Edinburgh, Lytwyn played for Hibernian, Falkirk, Brechin City, Berwick Rangers, Alloa Athletic, East Stirlingshire, Stenhousemuir and Bonnyrigg Rose Athletic.
