= Lallemant =

Lallemant is a French surname that may originate in the phrase "l’Allemand", meaning "the German." Variants of the name include: Laleman, Lalemand, Lalemant, Lalleman, L'allemand, and Lallemand. Notable people with the surname or variants include:

== Lallemant ==
- Charles Lallemant (1587–1674), first superior of the Jesuit missions in Canada
- Louis Lallemant (1588–1635), French Jesuit
- Jérôme Lalemant (1593–1673), Jesuit priest who came to Canada in 1638
- Gabriel Lalemant (1610–1649), Jesuit missionary, one of the eight Canadian Martyrs, a patron saint of Canada
- Jacques-Philippe Lallemant (1660–1748), French Jesuit
- François Antoine Lallemand (1774–1839), French general who served under Napoleon
- Raymond Lallemant (1919–2008), Belgian fighter pilot
- Lara Lallemant (born 2004), French cyclist

=== Variations ===
- Philippe Lallemand (1636–1716), French portrait painter
- Fritz L'Allemand (1812–1866), Austrian historical painter
- Theo Lalleman (1946–2013), Dutch artist and writer
- Roza Lallemand (1961–2008), French chess player

== See also ==
- Lalemant, Quebec, Canada
