= Arnauti (Zenica) =

Arnauti Арнаути
- Village
- Location within Bosnia and Herzegovina
- Coordinates: 44°12′3″N 18°3′18″E
- Country: Bosnia and Herzegovina
- Entity: Federation of Bosnia and Herzegovina
- Canton: Zenica-Doboj
- Municipality: Zenica

Area
  - Total: 1.83 sq mi (4.75 km^{2})

Population (2013)
  - Total: 1,053
  - Density: 574/sq mi (222/km^{2})
- Time zone: UTC+1 (CET)
  - Summer (DST): UTC+2 (CEST)

Arnauti (Cyrillic: Арнаути) is a village in the City of Zenica, Bosnia and Herzegovina.

== Demographics ==
According to the 2013 census, its population was 1,154.

Ethnicity in 2013
Ethnicity	Number	Percentage
Bosniaks	1,050	99.7%
other/undeclared	3	0.3%
Total	1,053	100%
