= Albert Rusnák =

Albert Rusnák may refer to:

- Albert Rusnák (footballer, born 1948) (cs), Czechoslovak footballer and football manager
- Albert Rusnák (footballer, born 1974), Slovak footballer and football manager
- Albert Rusnák (footballer, born 1994), Slovak footballer
