= Juho Suomalainen =

Finnish politician (1868–1941)

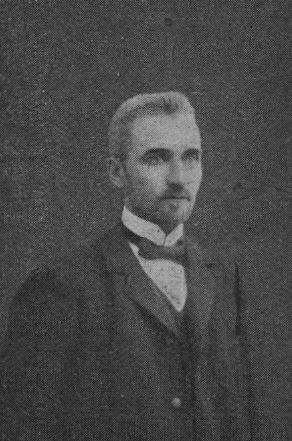
Juho Suomalainen

Juho Suomalainen (15 October 1868, in Vesanto – 16 April 1941) was a Finnish politician. He was a Member of the Parliament of Finland from 1907 to 1908, representing the Social Democratic Party of Finland (SDP).
