= Kristina Arnaudova =

Macedonian pop singer

Kristina Arnaudova Кристина Арнаудова
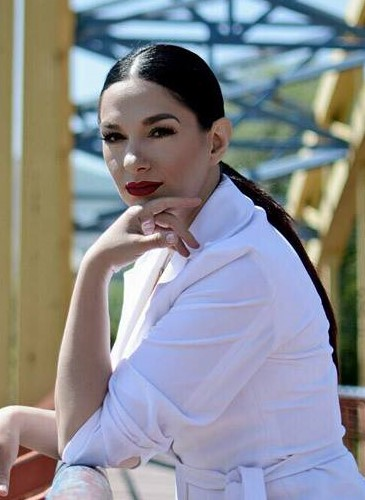

Background information
- Born: Kristina Arnaudova; 21 September 1979 (age 46); Negotino, SFR Yugoslavia (present-day North Macedonia)
- Genres: Pop Rock
- Occupations: Singer, also Graduated BA
- Years active: 1996-present
- Website: www.kristinaarnaudova.com

Kristina Arnaudova (Macedonian: Кристина Арнаудова; born 1979) is a Macedonian pop singer.

She is also president and founder of the largest Macedonian association for children at social risk, Project Happiness.

== Biography ==
She was born on 21 September 1979 in Negotino, where she spent her childhood days. Since she was little, she has been different from her peers, so instead of playing with other children, she spent her days singing, dreaming that one day she will be singing on TV and that music will be her vocation.

Thanks to her grandmother Ristenka, who was a French and Latin teacher, at the age of three, Kristina developed a desire to learn the French language and she got her love for reading books from her grandfather Yusuf, from whom she inherited the sense of dignity, a personality trait that become her most prominent personality trait.

Although at school she was known as a mischievous, headstrong child, she never had problems with learning and her grades.

She held a microphone for the first time at the age of four in kindergarten, when she led a school recital and sang songs. Her uncle (a drummer) played a decisive role in her love for music with the rehearsals he and his band had under the roof of their home.

With a distinct talent for writing songs, she started writing songs from a young age.

In all her interviews at the beginning of her career, she mentions her mother Mary (Mezhdet) who, raising her alone, as a single mother, taught her all the values Kristina has in life: honesty, perseverance, and love." You're nothing If you don't have love"... these are the words that her mother points out to her as guidelines in life.

Coming from a multi-ethnic family, a Turkish grandfather and Vlach grandmother, she faced reality from a young age, and learned how cruel people can be to those who are different from them very early on.

Furthermore, living in a single-parent family, at times when it is not a common thing, in a small town where people are full of prejudices, drives her to leave her small hometown at the age of 18. She says she loves Negotino, but she hopes that one day people there will learn to respect the quality people have and be proud of them rather than reject and forget them.

She finished secondary education in her hometown Negotino, at the high school St. Kiril i Metodij.

In 1996, at the age of 16, she enrolled herself to the "Teen Fest" Festival. She won first place among 150 candidates from all over Macedonia. She recorded her first song which did not achieve any media popularity. At the age of 16, she founded a band that performed locally and played pop-rock, a sound that she had become known for and began to earn money from music, dreaming that money can one day get her a piece of pop heaven and music.

In 1997 she became part of the rock band "Saga", with whom she recorded only one song, and it was her biggest success until then.

In 1998, at the invitation of Davor Jordanovski, she became a member of Big Bang, a group with which she remained until 2000. With Big Ben they recorded several songs that did well with the audience.

In the same year she finished high school and enrolled to the Faculty of Law, majoring in journalism.

The same year she moved to Skopje where she lives until today.

In 2000, she began her solo career with the song "Sun" (Sonce), composed by Aleksandar Ristevski – Prinz.

From 2000 to 2003, she had more than 200 appearances at public events, concerts, solo performances, and festivals.

In 2003, she released the album "Trains" (Vozovi), with 14 songs, by the most famous Macedonian authors, 8 of which became hits, climbing up to the first place on all the Macedonian charts, including "Dust" (Prashina), "You know who he is" (Znaesh koj e toj), "Give me your hand" (Podaj mi raka), "You are destined" (Sudeno ti e), "Do you think of us" (Dali mislish na nas), "Trains" (Vozovi), "Yours to the end" (Tvoja do kraj).

Among music editors and connoisseurs of Macedonian pop music, the album "Trains" (Vozovi) is considered a cult album that made a big step in Macedonian pop rock music. It won the "Best Album of 2003" Award and received more than 10 nominations at annual events, including Hit of the Year, Female Singer of the Year, Lyrics of the Year, Best Video Recording, etc.

In 2004, Kristina enrolled at the London University Business College, where she graduated in 2007 as a Business Administrator. She never completed her studies in journalism.

In 2006, she married her longtime love, the handball player Aleksandar Petrovski, with whom she has two children, Maxim born in 2010 and Mateo born in 2016.

In 2008, she released the album titled "2007". The album is entirely executed and musically produced by her and it includes 12 songs by the best Macedonian authors.

This album contains songs such as "I have no heart for another"(Nemam srce za drug), "Naked in our Hearts" (Goli vo srcata), "First and last" (Prv I posleden), "Why" (Zoshto), that reached the top of Macedonian charts, and the song "Don’t leave me" (Ne me ostavaj) which held the first place on the list of Balkans performers for 7 weeks on the most famous international music channel MTV. The song reached 3rd place on MTV's International Music Top List of world performers.

From 2004 to 2008 she had more than 300 performances at public events, solo appearances, festivals, etc.

After her media break which she used to dedicate herself to her first son Maxim and her family, in 2012 she recorded her original song, "Only once" (Samo ednash) and then wrote the anthem for the Handball Club Metalurg, "Metalurg is a champion".

Meanwhile, she collaborated with Vasil Hadjimanov on their cult song "Da si merak" and promote it in June 2012.

In 2013 she published "Take me" (Zemi me), a song that is her author's work, in collaboration with Bojan Trajkovski, and it is a song that has become one of her evergreens, known and sung even today.

"Take me" won the award for best pop rock hit at the Radio Festival 2014.

In May 2014 she released the album "Zemi me" titled after its most famous song and the songs from that album, including the duet with the group "I Q", became hits on the radio stations.

At the "Skopje Festival" 2015, she appeared as the author of two songs, one of which, "Beautiful" (Ubava) later became the biggest hit and was performed by the group "I Q", won the first place at the festival.

In 2015, Christina decided to make her long-time childhood dream a reality and founded an association dedicated to children living in poverty, which she called "Project Happiness".

Today, the "Happiness Project" is her priority and the largest association for children in North Macedonia. The organization runs free music and arts school and a drama studio for children in Skopje. Through her involvement with the Happiness Project, Kristina writes all the projects the association works on and locates sources of funding. She sees children in need as a primary concern for both herself and the Happiness Project. This personal involvement and being directly in touch with parents and children from all over the country has made Kristina well known.

Within the association, Kristina started the first free music and arts school for children at social risk, "Gitari Dirki i Svirki", located in Skopje, and a Children's Drama Studio "Neverland". Both are completely free of charge for children in social risk.

She believes that only well-educated and happy children can lead to a better society and that if we don't provide children with equal opportunities today, the consequences for the whole society in the future will be dire.

Since 2016 she has been entirely dedicated to her humanitarian work, family and children. Her music career and live performances have taken the back seat. Children at social risk and humanitarian work, she says, are her occupation, her life's mission and her love.

Kristina says she has never given her utmost in the music career since family and humanitarian work have always been her priority. Nonetheless, she does not regret it, because everyone should follow their heart, not their balance in the bank account.

Kristina is a singer, author, producer, woman, mother, wife, humanitarian, a person who stands for a better life and equality for everyone, especially children.

As a public figure, humanitarian and musician, she has won numerous awards, including:

2017- Philanthropist of the Year in Macedonia, awarded by the Association Horus supported by the European Union

2018- Award for Most Socially Responsible Public Personality in Macedonia, awarded by Story Award

2019- Socially Most Influential Woman – awarded by "Womеn entrepreneurs of the Year"

2020 – Most Successful Woman of the Year – one of the 12 women proclaimed by the media

2021 – Project Happiness- most successful association in North Macedonia – awarded by Horus EU

2022 – Humanitarian Award for Greatest Achievements in Humanities – Mother Theresa

"Dust" ("Prashina") single – Hit of the Year for 2001/2002

"Trains" ("Vozovi") – Album of the Year for 2003

"Take Me" ("Zemi me") – Hit of the Year for 2014

"Beloved" ("Ljubena") – Hit of the Year for 2018

"Beautiful" ("Ubava") – First Place Award at the Skopje Festival 2015

Numerous recognitions, honors, acknowledgments etc.
