= Maltezos =

Maltezos (Greek: Μαλτέζος) is a Greek surname; feminine: Maltezou (Μαλτέζου), literally meaning "Maltese". Notable people with the surname include:

- Christos Maltezos (1908–1938), Greek communist murdered during the Metaxas regime
- Chryssa Maltezou (1941–2025), Greek historian
- Yiannis Maltezos (1915–1987), Greek artist
- Yvonni Maltezou (born 1949), Greek actress
