= Ruotsalainen =

Ruotsalainen is a Finnish surname (literally meaning "a Swede", but as a name originally referring to the adherents of Lutheran Christianity in Karelia). It may refer to:

== People ==
- Arttu Ruotsalainen (born 1997), Finnish ice hockey forward
- Gabriel Ruotsalainen (1893–1984), Finnish long-distance runner
- Ilona Ruotsalainen (born 1981), Finnish snowboarder
- Juhani Ruotsalainen (1948–2015), Finnish ski jumper
- Maiju Ruotsalainen (born 1983), Finnish footballer and coach
- Paavo Ruotsalainen (1777–1852), Finnish farmer and preacher
- Pirjo Ruotsalainen (born 1944), Finnish orienteer
- Rauno Ruotsalainen (born 1938), Finnish footballer
- Reijo Ruotsalainen (born 1960), Finnish ice hockey defenceman
- Satu Ruotsalainen (born 1966), Finnish heptathlete
- Veikko Ruotsalainen (1908–1986), Finnish skier

== See also ==
- Ruotsalainen (lake)
