= Tătărăști =

- Commune
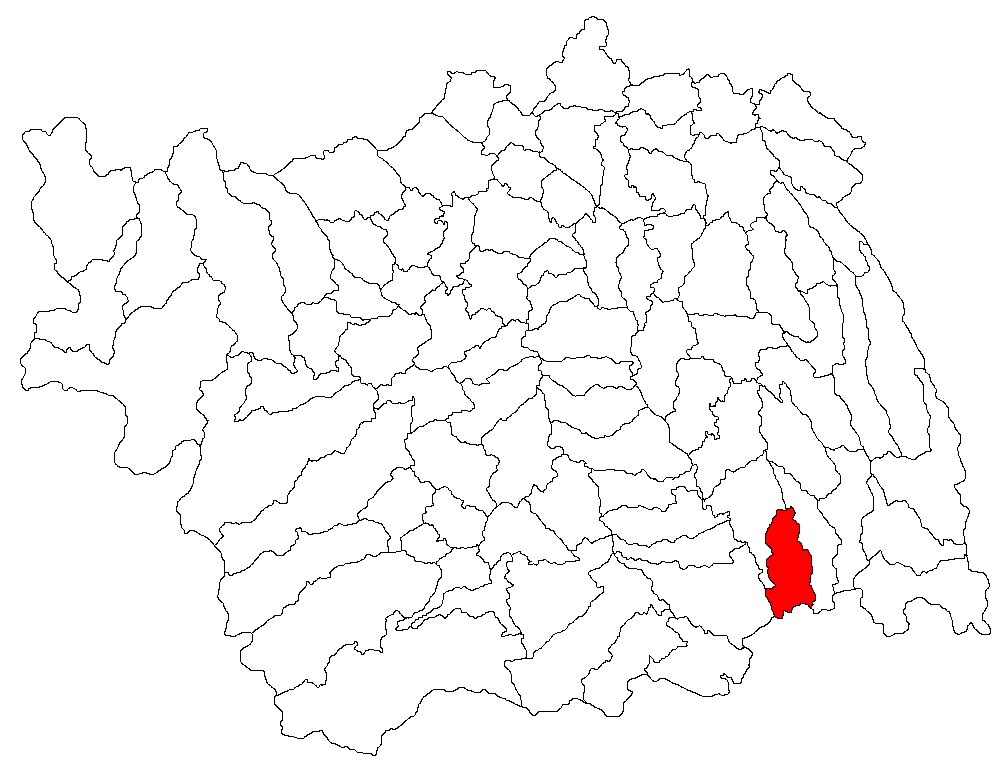
- Location in Bacău County

- Location in Romania
- Coordinates: 46°13′N 27°12′E
- Country: Romania
- County: Bacău

Government
  - Mayor (2020–2024): Petru Tăbăcaru (PSD)
- Area: 91.53 km^{2} (35.34 sq mi)
- Elevation: 226 m (741 ft)
- Population (2021-12-01): 1,857
  - Density: 20/km^{2} (53/sq mi)
- Time zone: EET/EEST (UTC+2/+3)
- Postal code: 607620
- Area code: +(40) 234
- Vehicle reg.: BC
- Website: comunatatarasti.ro

Tătărăști is a commune in Bacău County, Western Moldavia, Romania. It is composed of seven villages: Cornii de Jos, Cornii de Sus, Drăgești, Gherdana, Giurgeni, Tătărăști, and Ungureni.
