= Pete Alvanos =

American football coach

Biographical details
- Education: Drexel (1988)

Coaching career (HC unless noted)
- 1987: Navy (assistant)
- 1992–1993: Redlands (LB)
- 1994–1997: Chicago (DC/ST)
- 1998–2000: Swarthmore
- 2001–2005: Hamilton

Administrative career (AD unless noted)
- 2016–present: North County HS (MD)

Head coaching record
- Overall: 10–56

Pete Alvanos is an American high school sports administrator and former college football coach. He is the athletic director at North County High School in Glen Burnie, Maryland. position he had held since 2018. Avavanos served as the head football coach Swarthmore College in Swarthmore, Pennsylvania from 1998 to 2000 and Hamilton College in Clinton, New York from 2001 to 2005, compiling a career college football coaching record of 10–56. He was the final head coach of the Swarthmore Garnet Tide football program, which was disbanded after the 2000 season.

== Head coaching record ==
Year	Team	Overall	Conference	Standing	Bowl/playoffs
Swarthmore Garnet Tide (Centennial Conference) (1998–2000)
1998	Swarthmore	0–8	0–7	8th	
1999	Swarthmore	1–8	0–7	8th	
2000	Swarthmore	4–5	2–5	6th	
Swarthmore:		5–21			
Hamilton Continentals (New England Small College Athletic Conference) (2001–2005)
2001	Hamilton	1–7	1–7		
2002	Hamilton	0–8	0–8		
2003	Hamilton	2–6	2–6		
2004	Hamilton	1–7	1–7		
2005	Hamilton	1–7	1–7	9th	
Hamilton:		5–35	5–35		
Total:		10–56			
