= Tătaru (surname) =

Tătaru is a Romanian surname that may refer to:

- Daniel Tătaru (born 1967), Romanian mathematician
- Gheorghe Tătaru (1948–2004), Romanian football striker
- Ionuț Tătaru (born 1989), Romanian footballer
- Nelu Tătaru (born 1972), Romanian politician
