= Mordvinov =

Mordvinov (Russian: Мордвинов, masculine), or Mordvinova (Мордвинова, female), is a surname in Russia. Derived from Mordvin people, it belongs to the Russian noble Mordvinov family. Notable people with the surname include:

- Semyon Mordvinov (1701–1777), admiral
- Nikolay Mordvinov (admiral) (1754–1845), admiral and statesman
- Aleksand Mordvinov (1799–1858), painter
- Arkady Mordvinov (1896–1964), architect
- Nikolay Mordvinov (actor) (1901–1966)
- Igor Mordvinov
- Amalia Mordvinova (born 1973), Russian film and stage actress, TV and radio presenter
- Vera Aleksandrovna Mordvinova, birth name of Vera Aleksandrova (1895–1966), Russian literary critic, historian, and editor

== See also ==
- Mordvinov Island
