= Csák (surname) =

Csák is a Hungarian surname. Notable people with the surname include:

- Elemér Csák (1944–2025), Hungarian journalist
- Ibolya Csák (1915–2006), Hungarian athlete
- István Csák (1915–1976), Hungarian hockey player
- József Csák (born 1966), Hungarian judoka
