= Litwin =

Litwin is a Polish surname, meaning "Lithuanian person" or anyone from the Grand Duchy of Lithuania. It may refer to:

- Czesław Litwin (1955–2024), Polish politician
- Eric Litwin (born 1966), American storyteller and musician
- Leonard Litwin (1914−2017), American real estate developer
