= Mihai Grecu =

Moldovan artist (1916–1998)

Mihai Grecu OR
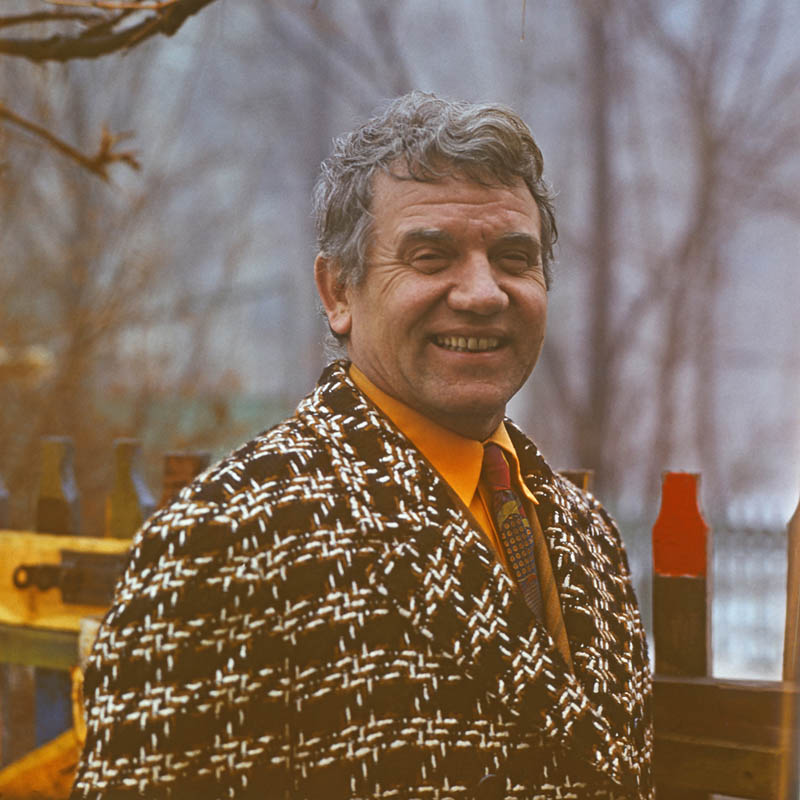
- Grecu in the 1970s
- Born: 22 November 1916; Faraonivka, Bessarabia Governorate, Russian Empire
- Died: 9 April 1998 (aged 81); Chişinău, Moldova
- Resting place: Chişinău
- Education: Moldova State University

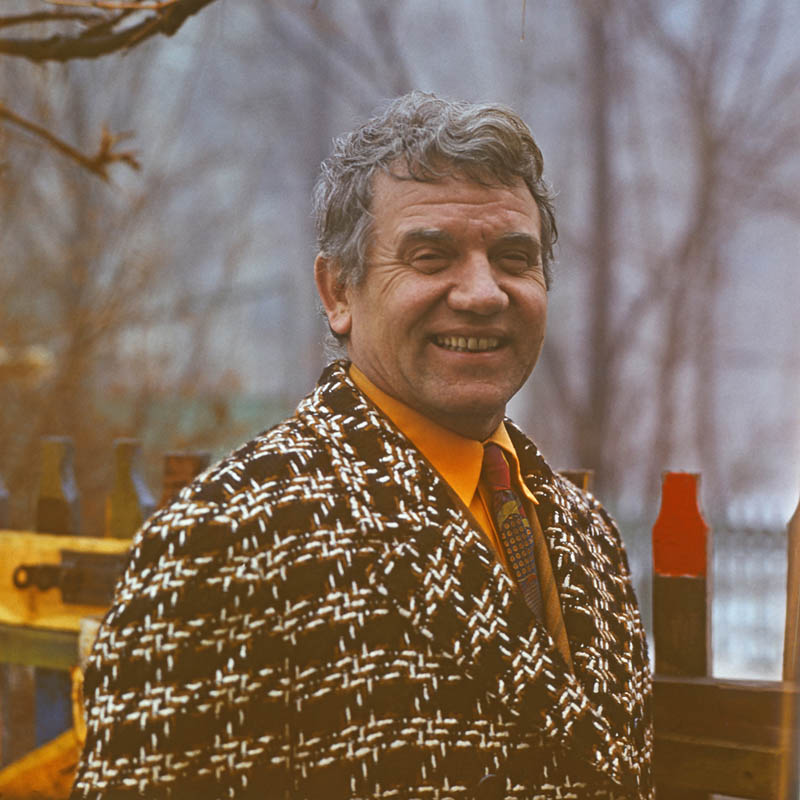
Mihai Grecu

Mihai Grecu (22 November 1916 – 9 April 1998) was a painter from Moldova. According to Lonely Planet:

The biggest name in Moldovan painting is Mihai Grecu (1916–98), who co-founded the National School of Painting and was also a poet and free love advocate. His works range from the formally classical to a folk-styled art naive.

== Personal Exhibitions in the Republic ==
- 1946 – The Union of the Plastic Artists, Chișinău
- 1958 – The State Art Museum of the MSSR, Chișinău
- 1963 – The Architect's House, Chișinău
- 1966 – "Mihai Grecu at 50 years", Chișinău
- 1969 – The Architect's House, Chișinău
- 1977 – The State Art Museum of the MSSR, Chișinău
- 1986 – "Mihai Grecu at 70 years", Chișinău
- 1992 – Chișinău
- 1996 – "Mihai Grecu at 80", the National Art Museum of Moldova, Chișinău

== Personal Exhibitions Abroad ==
- 1965 – Baku, Azerbaijan
- 1965 – Odesa, Ukraine
- 1966 – Chernivtsi, Ukraine
- 1968 – Tallinn, Tartu (Estonia), Riga, Liepāja (Latvia)
- 1969 – Lviv, Ukraine
- 1971 – Moscow, Russian Federation
- 1973 – Vilnius (Lithuania) and Vologda, Russian Federation
- 1974 – Yerevan (Armenia), Mykolaiv (Ukraine)
- 1975 – Leningrad (Saint Petersburg), Russian Federation
- 1977 – Novosibirsk, Russian Federation
- 1980 – Odesa, Ukraine
- 1989 – Moscow, Russian Federation
- 1992 – Bacău and Bucharest (Romania)

== Decorations ==
- 1960 – The Order "Insigna de Onoare" (The Badge of Honor)
- 1972 – The Master of Fine Arts of the MSSR
- 1987 – The People's Plastic Artist of the MSSR
- 1992 – Order of the Republic (Moldova)

== Prizes ==
- 1966 – Golden Medal of the Republican Exhibition of the National Economy of the USSR for the picture "Zi de toamna" (Autumn Day)
- 1970 – Golden Medal of the Republican Exhibition of the National Economy of the USSR for the triptych "Istoria unei vieti" (History of a Life)
- 1978 – Laureate of the State Prize of the MSSR
- 1990 – Laureate of the State Prize of the USSR
- 1991 – The Great Prize at the 1st Edition of the "Moldova Art Salons" for, the picture "Omagiu stramosilor" (Homage to the Ancestors), Romania

== Works ==
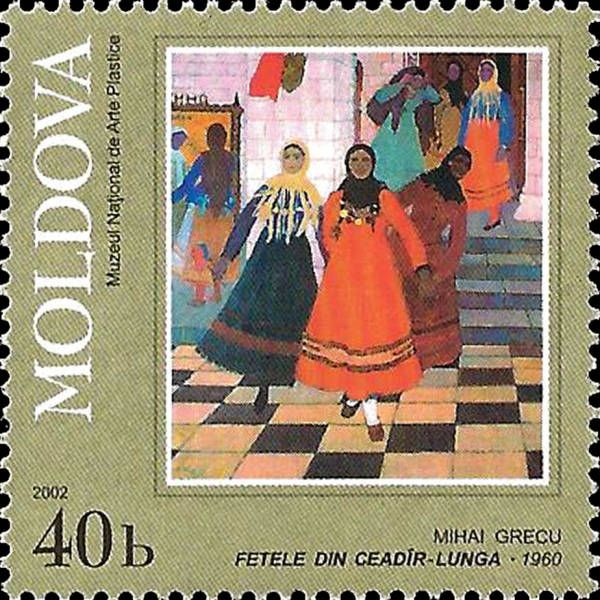
The Girls from Ciadar-Lunga on a 2002 Moldovan postage stamp.

- Maternity, 1943, paint, 50x34,5
- Woman with a Yellow Headkerchief, 1957, oil on canvas, 93x57
- Turkey (cock), 1969, oil on canvas, 120x120
- Hospitality, 1966–67, oil on canvas, 200x200
- Still-life with Quinces, 1967, oil on canvas, 66x60
- Recruits, 1965, oil on canvas, 131x150
- The Autumn Day, 1964, oil on canvas, 197x116
- The Gates of Orheiul Vechi, 1968 – 1974
- The Cranes Had Gone, 1973, mixed technology, canvas, 120x130
- The Bugeac House, 1982, oil on canvas, 120x130
- Supper in the Field, 1970–1971, oil on canvas, 120x130
- The Old Mill, 1976, oil on canvas, 120x100
- The Girls from Ciadar-Lunga, 1960, oil on canvas, 193x172
