= George William Goddard =

US Air Force general, aerial photography pioneer (1889–1987)

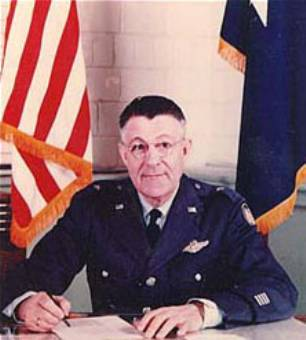
- Born: June 15, 1889; London, United Kingdom
- Died: September 20, 1987 (aged 98); Boca Raton, Florida, U.S.
- Burial place: Arlington National Cemetery
- Military career
- Allegiance: United States
- Branch: United States Air Force
- Service years: 1917–1953
- Rank: Brigadier general
- Commands: Chief of the Photographic Laboratory
- Conflicts: World War I World War II; Korean War
- Awards: Distinguished Service Medal; Legion of Merit (2)
- Other work: Air Force consultant

George William Goddard (June 15, 1889 – September 20, 1987) was a United States Air Force brigadier general and a pioneer in aerial photography.

== Early life and education ==
George William Goddard was born in London, England, in 1889. He moved to Rochester, New York, in June 1904 to live with his aunt and uncle. He was naturalized on April 27, 1918.

Goddard graduated from Washing Irving Preparatory School in New York in 1910 and attended Keuka Institute, now Keuka College in Keuka Park, New York, for two years. While at Keuka College, he witnessed early flights by Glenn Curtiss.

Goddard then studied commercial art in Rochester for a year. He was a free-lance cartoonist in Rochester until January 1916, when he became a staff artist for Coke and Iron Monthly in Chicago, Illinois. While in Chicago, he saw an exhibition by aviator Ruth Law which inspired him to learn to fly.

== Career ==
=== World War I ===
Originally Goddard intended to serve the war effort in the Corps of Engineers, but persuaded by a pilot he met en route to this job, he decided to join the Signal Corps Air Service to become a pilot instead. On December 14, 1917, Goddard enlisted in the Aviation Section of the U.S. Army Signal Corps and entered the aerial photography course at the School of Military Aeronautics at Cornell University. Upon completion of the three-month course, he became an instructor in aerial photographic interpretation.

Goddard was commissioned a second lieutenant in the Aviation Section Reserve on August 8, 1918, and assigned to Taliaferro Field, Fort Worth, Texas, to organize and take to France the 43rd, 44th and 45th Aerial Photographic sections.

Despite plenty of informal flying, Goddard did not become a rated pilot until two years after joining up. He had been assigned to photography because he had admitted to being an amateur photographer in civilian life.

=== Between the world wars ===
When the Armistice was declared, ending World War I, Goddard was transferred to Carlstrom Field, Arcadia, Florida, where he finally graduated from flying school and was rated a pilot in May 1919. At the personal urging of General Billy Mitchell, who was impressed with Goddard's camera experimentation, he was assigned to McCook Field, Ohio, as officer in charge of aerial photographic research. In that capacity, he started developments in the infra-red and long-range photography, special aerial cameras, photographic aircraft and portable field laboratory equipment and formed the nucleus of the Photographic Laboratory at Wright-Patterson Air Force Base, Ohio.

On July 1, 1920, Goddard received his regular commission as a second lieutenant in the Air Service, and was promoted immediately to first lieutenant the same date. He then was appointed officer in charge of aerial photography in the Office of the Chief of the Air Corps, Washington, D.C. While on that assignment, he received a presidential appointment as Air Corps representative on the Federal Board of Surveys and Maps. He organized the first Army aerial photographic mapping units that pioneered in mapping Muscle Shoals, Tennessee River Basin, Teapot Dome, Mississippi River and many other areas. As chief photographic officer, Goddard created the first aerial mapping units, directed photo coverage of General Billy Mitchell's 1921 warship bombings, and made mosaic maps of many cities and land area.

Returning to McCook Field, Goddard pioneered the development of nighttime reconnaissance photography in 1925. One night in 1925, he stunned Rochester, N.Y., by igniting an 80-pound flash powder bomb to light up the whole city. The result was the first aerial night photograph.

On a trip to the Philippines, Goddard mapped unexplored areas, and subsequently became Director of the photographic school at Chanute Field, Illinois.

Goddard personally developed and held the patents on the Air Force's system for taking night pictures. Developed in 1926, the system, with improvements, was still in use through the 1950s.

In 1934, Goddard directed aerial mapping in Alaska. As chief photographic officer at Wright Field, Ohio, he pioneered in stereoscopic, high altitude, and color photography and developed the film strip camera (see strip aerial photography).

Before and during World War II, Goddard went to England on several occasions to learn British methods of reconnaissance and exchange technical information. During these trips, he met with his counterpart in the Royal Air Force (RAF), Group Commander Frederick Laws, who had pioneered British aerial reconnaissance as early as 1913.

=== World War II ===
During World War II, Goddard promoted aerial reconnaissance, aided the Navy in use of the strip camera and color photography, and introduced the moving film magazine.

Goddard also directed the design of reconnaissance aircraft and equipment. At Wright Field, Goddard and his staff were preoccupied with preparing hitherto much-neglected reconnaissance aircraft types for the coming war. The biggest job was in modifying 100 P-38 Lightnings to F-4 standard. In 1941, Goddard got into a fierce bureaucratic and personal dispute with the then USAAC Director of Photography, Lieutenant Colonel Minton Kaye. It was exacerbated by Goddard's single-minded promotion of the continuously open-shutter strip-camera, which he revealed to the public in an extensive photo coverage in Life magazine. In punishment, for a time, the USAAC relegated Goddard to combat venereal disease at a base in Charlotte, NC. Using his connections, he was then detached to work on naval tasks, since the Navy thought the strip camera would be useful for amphibious operations in the Pacific.

In February 1944, Assistant Secretary of War for Air Robert Lovell sent Colonel Goddard to England to assist friend Colonel Elliott Roosevelt, the son of the president, in setting up the reconnaissance program for the 325th Reconnaissance Wing. Goddard helped modify F-8 Mosquitos for radar photography, and assisted in the development of night photography using the Edgerton D-2 skyflash. He also successfully interested the RAF in the strip camera, which Roosevelt had initially refused because it required very low altitude flight for best results. Goddard said later that the two collaborated in sending a letter to the President demanding that Colonel Kaye be removed from his posts in Washington. Kaye then fell in disfavor and was sent to India just short of his promotion to flag rank, and Goddard returned to the good graces of General Henry Arnold, the chief of the Air Force.

After the liberation of Paris, Goddard set up headquarters there and led in reconnaissance development for the U.S. air forces in theater. That winter, he finally succeeded in getting a stereo-strip camera installed in an F-6 Mustang, trying it out over Paris. With the occupation of Germany, Goddard received special clearance to take over and recover useful scientific and technical information from the Schneider Optical Plant at Bad Kreuznach and the renowned Carl Zeiss and Schott AG plants at Jena. Goddard was able to seize much data and material, and persuaded many optical scientists to move to the West just before the Red Army replaced American troops, but he complained that the State Department had countermanded much of this effort and returned equipment to the Soviets. During the war period, Goddard (along with Roosevelt) continued to stridently advocate for a dedicated reconnaissance aircraft, as opposed to the use of modified types.

By mid-August 1945, Colonel Goddard returned to Wright Field, restored as Director of Aerial Research and Development.

=== Cold War ===
In August 1945, Goddard was appointed chief of the Photographic Laboratory at Wright Field. Goddard was sent to Bikini Atoll in 1946 in connection with the atomic bomb test. He retired June 30, 1949, but was recalled to active duty the following day by General Hoyt Vandenberg, Air Force Chief of Staff, retaining his position as chief of the Photographic Laboratory.

In July 1950, Goddard was awarded the Thurman H. Bane Award for his development in low-altitude high-speed night photography.

During the early part of the Korean War in 1950, Goddard went to Korea to introduce this new system of night photography and the latest type strip camera, which has been highly successful in the low-altitude jet aircraft operations under adverse weather conditions.

In August 1951, he was awarded the honorary degree of master of photography by the Photographers Association of America, and also received the Progress Medal for 1951 at the annual convention of the Photographic Society of America, held in Detroit, Michigan.

In May 1952, Goddard was transferred to headquarters of NATO's Allied Air Forces in Central Europe at Fontainebleau, France, for duty as director of reconnaissance, Operations Division. While there, he worked with Central European countries to develop unified standards in aerial photographic methods.

In July 1953, Goddard was assigned to Headquarters Air Materiel Command, Wright-Patterson Air Force Base, Ohio.

Goddard was presented the George W. Harris award by the Photographers' Association of America at its 61st annual national convention in Chicago. Goddard received the award, the highest single honor the profession of photographers can bestow, for his contributions to the art of aerial photography in supervising development of aerial cameras, equipment and techniques.

"Aerial photography has come a long way even since World War II, General Goddard said. "Present advances in cameras, equipment and particularly in night photography, have greatly restricted maneuvers of the enemy in Korea."

"Fast jets, traveling at 600 miles an hour and at either 3,000 or 40,000 feet, are able to take continuous film strips of miles of territory that are as clear as day-time pictures. They are so clear that on pictures taken from 40,000 feet, you can count the ties in a railroad track, or the rivets on the wings of an airplane.

"Efforts to camouflage installations also are detected by new electronic aerial photo equipment," the general added.

General Goddard declared that advances in aerial photography have been greatly speeded by Congress' recognition of its value and its willingness to provide funds. Helpful, also, the general said, are the research experiments of three leading American universities. He referred to Boston University, Ohio State, and Wesleyan University as contributing significant advances.

Goddard's Law states that "in reconnaissance, there is no substitute for focal length."

== Awards and decorations ==
Brigadier General Goddard received a lot of decorations during his military service. Here is the list:

USAF Command Pilot wings
Army Distinguished Service Medal
Legion of Merit with Oak Leaf Cluster
World War I Victory Medal
American Defense Service Medal
American Campaign Medal
European-African-Middle Eastern Campaign Medal w/ two Service Stars
World War II Victory Medal
National Defense Service Medal
Korean Service Medal
United Nations Korea Medal
French Croix de Guerre 1939–1945 with Palm

== Later life and death ==
Goddard retired as a brigadier general in 1953. In 1962, during the Cuban Missile Crisis, Goddard served as an Air Force consultant on detecting and interpreting the Soviet missile sites in Cuba, especially by advocating the use of his strip camera for low-altitude flights.

Goddard was inducted into the National Aviation Hall of Fame in 1976.

Goddard died on September 20, 1987, at the age of 98. He was buried with his wife Elizabeth (1898–1984) at Arlington National Cemetery.

== Legacy ==
The Society of Photographic Instrumentation Engineers (SPIE) has awarded the George W. Goddard award annually since 1961 in recognition of "exceptional achievement in optical or photonic instrumentation for aerospace, atmospheric science, or astronomy. The award is for the invention and development of a new technique, photonic instrumentation, instrument, or system." Goddard was the first recipient of the award in 1961.

Goddard's autobiography, written with DeWitt S. Copp and published in 1969, is a piece of reconnaissance literature and an important and detailed source to the history of the field in the United States.

In 1976, Goddard was inducted into the International Air & Space Hall of Fame.

== Bibliography ==
- Goddard, George. Overview: A Lifelong Adventure in Aerial Photography. Doubleday, Garden City, 1969.
- Hansen, Chris. Enfant Terrible: The Times and Schemes of General Elliott Roosevelt. Able Baker Press, Tucson, 2012.
