= William Larson =

American photographer

William Larson (October 14, 1942 - April 4, 2019) was an American photographer who influenced the photographic world with conceptual pieces that examine the role of technology in art.

== Life ==
Larson completed his master's degree from the Institute of Design in Chicago in 1968, where he studied under Harry Callahan and Aaron Siskind. Although he began his career many decades ago, he never stopped analyzing and experimenting with the medium of photography.

His first exploration dealt primarily with the issues of time, continuity, and movement. Larson was one of the first to create slit-scan photographs (see strip photography), using medium-format film and a special motorized camera. With these stretched-out images, Larson managed to portray the fluid feeling of moving cinema within a still photograph. At the same time, he displayed his incredible technical expertise. He was fascinated by the way a fax machine could convert a photograph using audio code, and used this technological device to create works of art. In later years he investigated film projectors and toyed with notions of video art. He has shown at Gallery 339, in Philadelphia, and is represented by Gitterman Gallery, in New York.

Larson's works is represented in many collections including the George Eastman Museum, the Center for Creative Photography and the National Gallery of Australia, and in smaller quantities at the Metropolitan Museum of Art, the Museum of Modern Art, the J. Paul Getty Museum and the Philadelphia Museum of Art.

Born in North Tonawanda, New York, Larson lived and worked out of Philadelphia.

== Awards ==
He received a Guggenheim Fellowship (1982), a Pew Fellowships in the Arts (2001), several fellowships from the National Endowment for the Arts (1995, 1994, 1992, 1971, 1979, 1986), two Pennsylvania Council on the Arts Fellowships (1988, 1983), an Aaron Siskind Foundation Fellowship (1993), and two grants from the Polaroid Corporation (1979).
