= Photo finish =

Method for determining winner of races

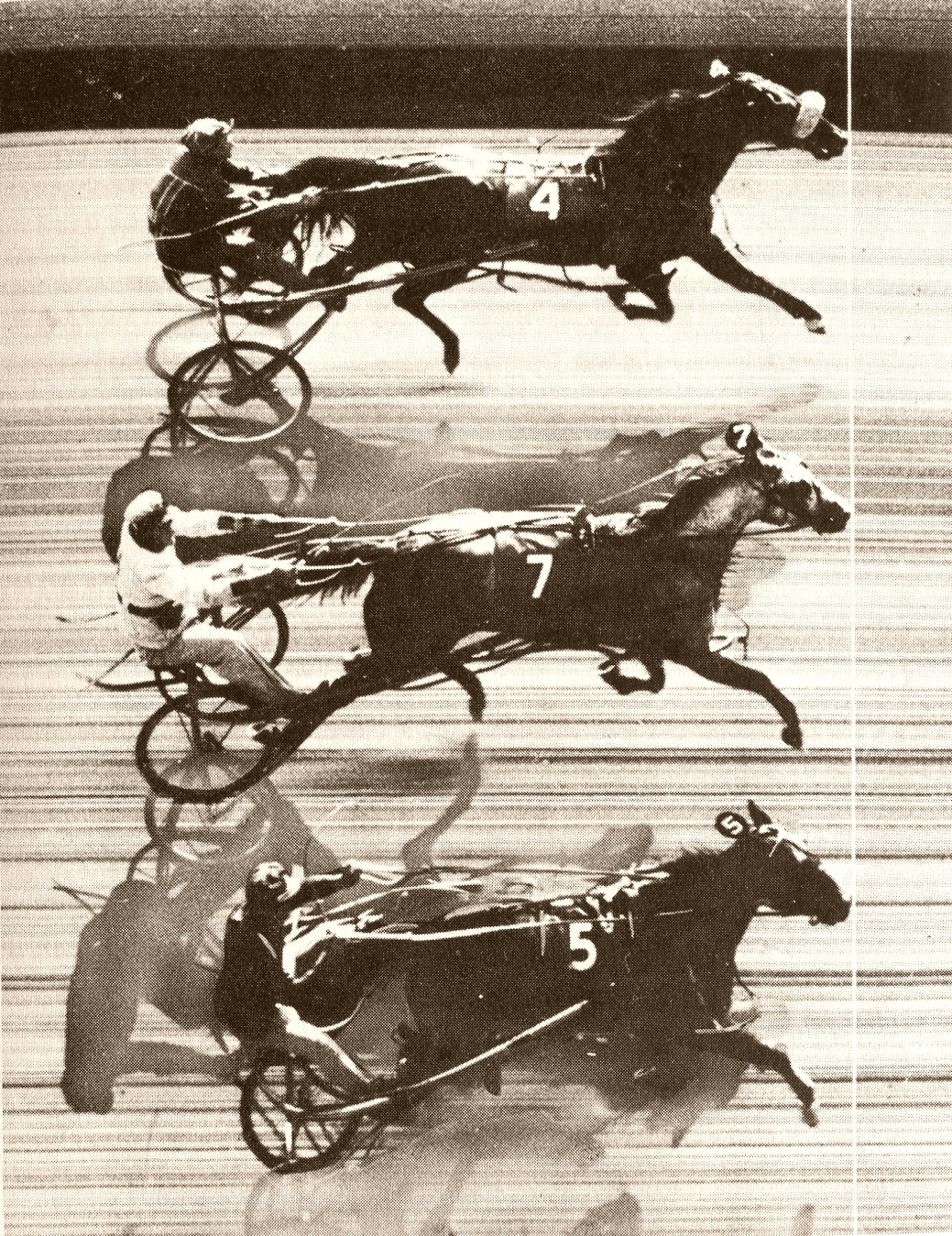
A photo finish record of the first triple dead heat in harness racing: Patchover, Payne Hall and Penny Maid at Freehold Raceway (US), October 1953

A photo finish occurs in a sporting race when multiple competitors cross the finishing line at nearly the same time. As the naked eye may not be able to determine which of the competitors crossed the line first, a photo or video taken at the finish line may be used for more accurate check. Photo finishes make it less likely that officials will declare a race a dead heat.

Finish line photos are still used in nearly every modern racing sport. Although some sports use electronic equipment to track the racers during a race, a photo is considered the most important evidence in selecting the winner. They are especially important during close races, but they are also used to assign official times to each competitor during any race.

== Method of capture ==
=== Strip photography ===
Photo-finish cameras were developed during the 1940s and 1950s as a means of regulating the racing industry and to reduce cheating. Betting on races became increasingly popular during the middle decades of the twentieth century. Authorities were therefore concerned to improve the probity of racing which was widely regarded as corrupt.

Typically photo-finish cameras use strip photography, in which a camera is aimed at the finish line from an elevated position in a tower. It captures only the sequence of events on that line in the vertical dimension. Every part of each racer's body is shown as it appeared the moment it crossed the line; anything stationary is represented as a horizontal streak. The horizontal position represents time, and time markings along the bottom of the photo can be used to find the exact crossing time of any racer. The high angle allows judges to see the position of every racer in relation to the others.

In a conventional photograph, the image shows a variety of locations at a fixed moment in time; strip photography swaps the time and space dimensions, showing a variety of times at a fixed location.

The final image often shows a solid white background, which is a continuous scan of the painted finish line. Racers may appear distorted based on the movement of their limbs and heads as they cross the line; limbs are elongated where they remain static or move backwards in relation to the slit-shutter, or truncated if they move faster than the film moving past the slit.

==== Film ====
Single-exposure photo-finish images are made by a camera positioned at the finish line; this was initially applied to horse racing. The camera's shutter, which captures 136 images each second, is triggered as a horse breaks a thin thread on the race track. All too often, the single-exposure photo-finish camera failed to capture the decisive, first-place finish-line moment. These cameras were only used for first-place finishes, and provided no help in determining any of the other race placings. The oldest single-exposure race-track photo-finish images discovered so far were made by John Charles Hemment in 1890.

Historically, motion picture cameras had been used in the United States since the 1920s for recording race-meets but were unsuitable for photo-finish photography as the frame rate was too low to catch the critical instant when horses or dogs reached the finish line. This was achieved by using a special slit camera. Lorenzo Del Riccio, a Paramount Pictures motion picture engineer, improved the circular flow camera, a device which had been invented in the 1930s specifically for the purpose of photographing moving objects. The first racing club to make use of Del Riccio's "Photo-Chart" camera for photo finishes was the Del Mar Turf Club in California at its inaugural meeting in 1937.

Unlike conventional cameras, which use a shutter, the circular flow camera uses a single vertical slit – a strip of film moved horizontally across the fine vertical opening located in the focal plane. This limits the field of vision to no more than a few inches, the restricted field being aligned with the vertical line on the winning post on which the lens is focused. The strip film moves across the slit in the same direction to the race and at substantially the same speed as the rate of movement of the image of the horses as each passes the finishing line. This keeps the image of the horses more or less stationary with respect to the film. As soon as the first horse starts to pass over the line, the camera begins to record its image on the moving film from the nose backwards, progressively along the length of the body, with the arrival of every horse at the finishing post in succession. This produces a strip photographic record of the horses as they pass the vertical plane (winning post). Film is advanced continuously at a pace equivalent to the average speed of a racing horse, resulting in distortions of length (slower-moving horses appear to be stretched), but still preserving the order of finishers.

Australian Bertram Pearl made an improvement in 1948 incorporating a mirror and neon-pulse time signature in the winning-post. This provides a precisely aligned image showing both sides of the horses, and a set of stripes left by the neon 100th/sec intervals for accurate timing. Any perfect vertical alignment of the horses' reflection with the foreground image proves the camera is not viewing the finish line at an angle, thus incorrectly recording the horses' relative positions. Pearl's partner was his friend, society portraitist Athol Shmith. Shmith helped accelerate processing of the strip of negative down to 55 seconds, then to 35 seconds. These times rivaled the instant one-minute processing by Edwin Land's newly available Model 95 Polaroid camera.

==== Digital ====
Digital cameras use a 1-dimensional array sensor to take 1-pixel-wide sequential images of the finish line. Since only a single line of the CCD is read out at a time, the frame rates can be very high (up to 20,000 frames per second). Unlike a film-based photo finish, there is no delay from developing the film, and the photo finish is available immediately. They may be triggered by a laser, photovoltaic means, or even motion sensing done within the photo finish camera.

=== Video ===
Another method for creating this strip involves combining individual photographs. A high-speed camera or a movie camera is used to take a continuous series of partial frame photos at a fast rate, while leaving no blank space between the cells.

== Uses ==
=== Athletics ===
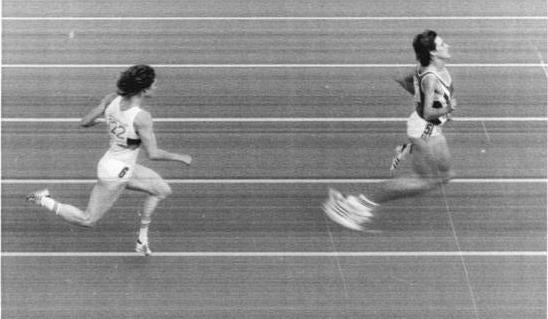
1987 400-metre hurdles: Sabine Busch 53.24; Cornelia Ullrich 53.55

In athletics, races have to be timed accurately to hundredths (or even thousandths) of a second. A battery of electronic devices are installed in high-profile events (such as the Olympic Games) to ensure that accurate timings are given swiftly both to the spectators and to the officials. The photo finish has been used in the Olympics since as early as 1912, when the Stockholm Olympics used a camera system in the men's 1500 metres race. The 1948 Olympics saw the finish of the men's 100-metre race determined with the use of photo finish equipment provided by Swiss watchmaker Omega and the British Race Finish Recording Company.

At the finish line, photocells and digital cameras are used to establish the placings. Sometimes, in a race as fast as the 100 m sprint, all eight athletes can be separated by less than half a second. It is not uncommon for two athletes to have exactly the same time recorded without there being a dead heat.

The 2008 Summer Olympics saw the introduction of some of the fastest timekeeping equipment yet, with cameras that take photographs 3,000 times a second (compared to 1996, which were 1,000 times per second).

=== Triathlon ===
The 2012 Summer Olympics had a photo finish during a triathlon event in which Nicola Spirig of Switzerland and Lisa Nordén of Sweden finished the race at nearly the same time, but with Spirig ranked first. The Swedish Olympic Committee appealed the ranking. They claimed that the athletes should be ranked as joint winners because it was not clear that Spirig was ahead of Nordén. The camera on the far side of the track could have given additional evidence, but it was malfunctioning. The appeal was rejected and Spirig was declared the winner. This is the first time an Olympic triathlon result was decided on a photo finish.

=== Cycling ===
After a close sprint final in the Men's under-23 road race at the 2010 UCI Road World Championships in Melbourne, the organisers had to declare a dead heat between the two riders finishing just behind race winner Michael Matthews and runner-up John Degenkolb, as they were unable to detect any differences on the images taken from Tissot's photo finish camera. Therefore, the riders Taylor Phinney and Guillaume Boivin were both awarded a bronze medal.

In the 2017 Tour de France a difference of 0.0003 seconds was judged by photo finish to separate the winner Marcel Kittel from Edvald Boasson Hagen, second, in the seventh stage of the race on July 7.

=== Motor racing ===
Photo finishes are possible in NASCAR throughout its three major-tier series. As of 2025, the closest finishes in each series are listed below:

The closest finish in the NASCAR Cup Series had a margin of victory of 0.001 seconds, which was when Kyle Larson bested Chris Buescher in the 2024 AdventHealth 400 at Kansas Speedway.

The closest finish in the NASCAR Xfinity Series and the closest finish in NASCAR had a margin of victory of 0.0004 seconds, when Tyler Reddick beat Elliott Sadler to win the 2018 PowerShares QQQ 300 at Daytona International Speedway.

The closest finish in the NASCAR Craftsman Truck Series had a margin of victory of 0.001 seconds, when Butch Miller beat Mike Skinner to win the 1995 Total Petroleum 200 at Colorado National Speedway.

The closest eNASCAR Coca-Cola iRacing Series finish ever was the 2024 Coca-Cola 160 at Charlotte Motor Speedway ended up with Garrett Lowe narrowly edged out Jimmy Mullis across the line by a margin of 0.001 seconds.

=== Horse racing ===
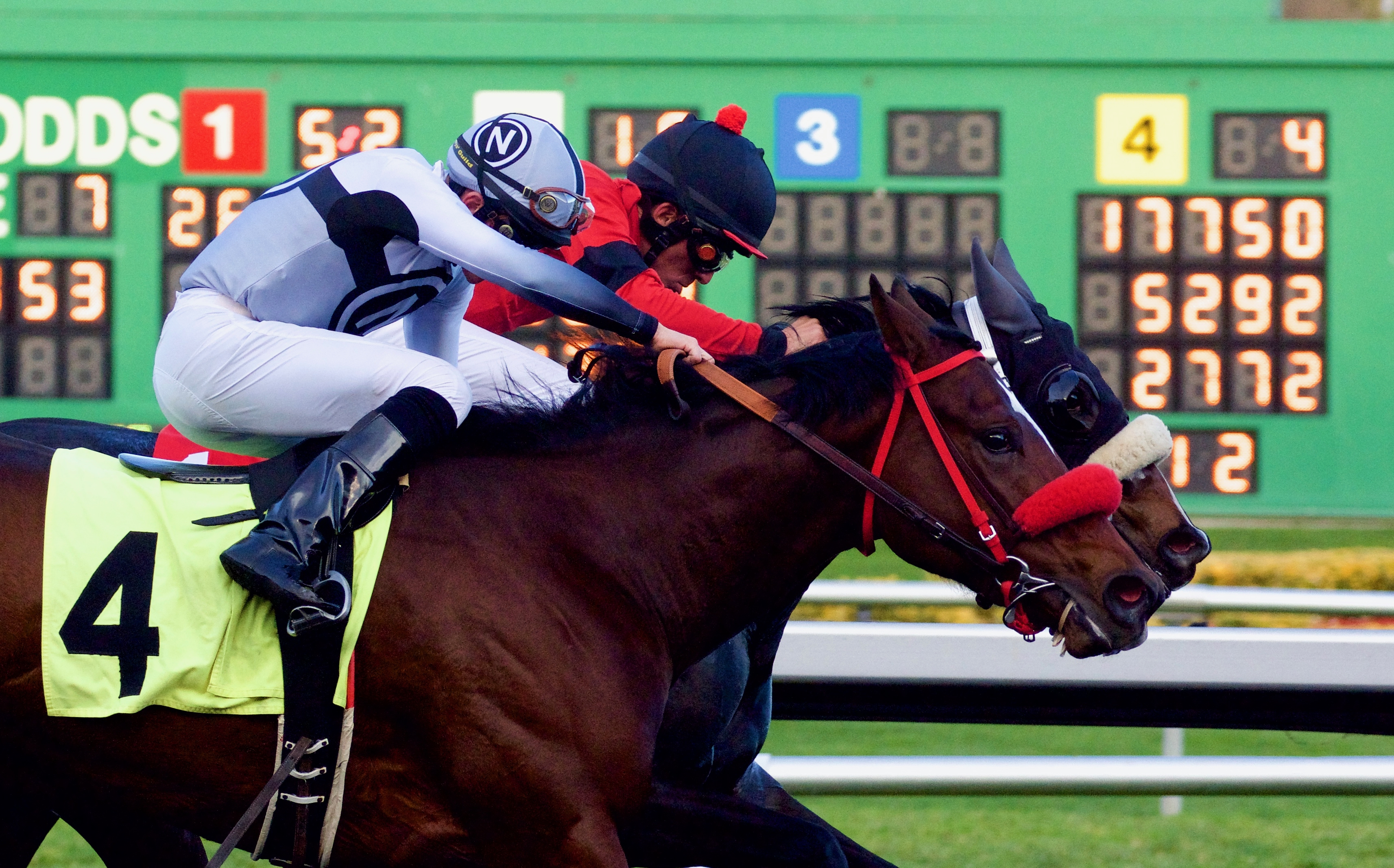
A dead heat

In horse racing, photo finishes determine accurately when the horses hit the finish line. This developed in the late 1930s, by the end of which strip cameras were used for photo finishes; prior to this point high-speed motion picture cameras were used, but did not provide sufficient temporal resolution. Stewards at the racetrack usually put up PHOTO status on the races during these photo finishes; the status of objection or inquiry can also trigger if other horses or jockeys somehow interfered in the horse rankings and can factor in dead heats. The most notable dead heat was in the 1989 Hambletonian Stakes, with both Park Avenue Joe and Probe finishing in a dead heat. A photo finish decided the winner of the 2005 running of the Japan Cup, which was given to Alkaseed, narrowly defeating Heart's Cry. In 2011 with new digital technology recording vision at 10,000 frames per second, Dunaden was declared a winner over Red Cadeaux in the $6 million Melbourne Cup. And in the 150th running of the Kentucky Derby in 2024, Mystik Dan edged past Sierra Leone and Forever Young in one of the closest three-way photo finishes at any horse racing event.

== See also ==
- Dead heat

- List of dead heat horse races

- Fully automatic timing
- Slit-scan photography
- Streak camera
