= Scanography =

Graphic arts medium

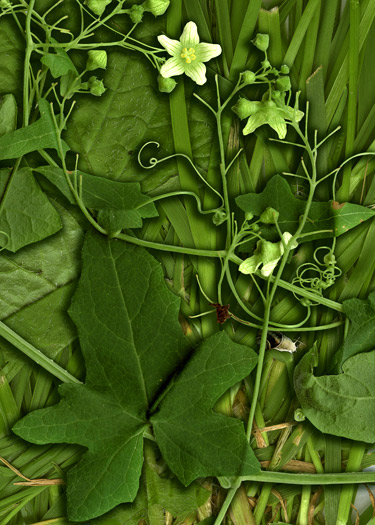
"Bryone-dioique", a still life done on a scanner by French artist Christian Staebler

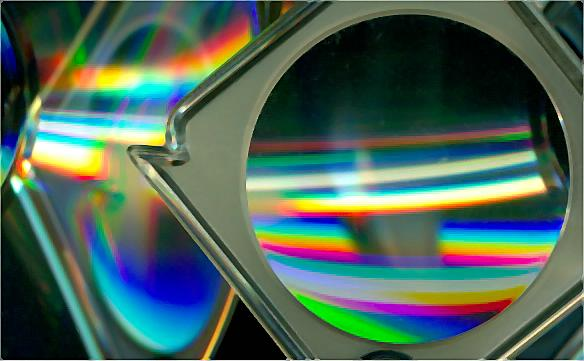
A magnifying glass and CD-ROM discs placed at an angle to the bed show reflection, refraction, and diffraction effects that can be generated.

Scanography (also spelled scannography), more commonly referred to as scanner photography, is the process of capturing digitized images of objects for the purpose of creating printable art using a flatbed "photo" scanner with a CCD (charge-coupled device) array capturing device. Fine art scanography differs from traditional document scanning by using atypical objects, often three-dimensional, as well as from photography, due to the nature of the scanner's operation.

== History ==
The process of creating art with a scanner can be as simple as arranging objects on the scanner and capturing the resulting image; in fact, some early artists in the field worked with photocopiers to capture and print in a single step, resulting in the field of Xerox art. Artist Sonia Landy Sheridan, artist in residence at 3M and founder of the Generative Systems program at the Art Institute of Chicago was one of the first to exploit this ability in 1968, altering the variables of the photocopying process to produce artwork rather than mere copies. Though the physical process of arranging objects on a glass platen to capture a photogram is shared by both "Xerox" artists and "scanographers", regarding image quality- scanner photography has more in common with large format photography. The process records extremely fine detail with a rather shallow depth of field and produces a digital file (or "digital negative") for printmaking.

Using a computer and a photo editor between the scanning and the printing process provides the artist with a greater level of control, allowing, at a minimum, the ability to "clean" the image by removing specks and other imperfections in the capture. With the increased availability and affordability of flatbed color scanners in the 1990s, photoartists could now purchase a scanner rather than rent this equipment and the technician necessary to operate it, as Darryl Curran did in the early 1990s. Renting studio time at Nash Editions, Curran captured "scannograms" of objects from 1993-97. Harold Feinstein's One Hundred Shell and One Hundred Flower series contained scanned images side by side with traditional large format photography. Joseph Scheer scanned moths in Night Visions: The Secret Designs of Moths.

Never manipulating the scan, from 2003 artist Brian Miller pioneered movement, lighting, and background in scanner photo capture while maintaining classical subjects like figures and fruit; work available at Pierogi Gallery, NY. Exhibited 2005 to 2009 Madrid, New York, East Hampton. Published 2005 in La Sexualidad Es Tan Fragil Como el Amor, ISBN 84-609-6225-3, and 2007 Color Elefante, ISSN 1698-9295.

A 2008 exhibition titled "Scanner as Camera" at Washington and Lee University in Lexington, Virginia drew eight artists from across the United States whose subjects ranged from scanned and digitally manipulated historic ambrotype and tintype photographs and drawings to birds and insects found by the artist.

== Capture process ==
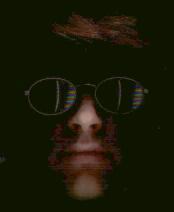
"Self portrait with scanner" shows the effects of the focused lighting and limited depth of field when using a scanner to capture a 3-D object.

Scanners differ significantly from digital camera in many areas. First, the optical resolution of a flatbed scanner can exceed 5000 pixels per inch (200 pixels per mm). Even at a relatively low resolution of 1200 pixels per inch (47 p/mm) a letter sized image would be 134 megapixels in size.

The depth of field of most scanners is very limited, usually no more than half an inch (12 mm), but the built-in light source provides excellent sharpness, color saturation, and unique shadow effects. The time it takes the scanning head to traverse the bed means that scanners can only be used to capture still objects, and common items used are flowers, leaves, and other suitable "still life" subjects.

=== Equipment ===
Using a flatbed scanner to scan items other than paper documents exceeds the original purpose of the scanner, so special care must be taken with the process. The bed of the scanner is typically made of glass, and care needs to be taken that the glass not be scratched or cracked when placing or removing items on the bed. Since the items to be captured are often placed directly on the bed, dust and other particles will often land on the glass, and care must be taken to keep the glass clean. Scanners will also hold only a limited amount of weight, and items that may damage the scanner, such a liquids or items that might scratch the glass, should be placed on a plastic barrier to protect the bed. Alternatively, picture frame glass cut a few inches larger than the scanner housing will protect the platen and the device from weeping botanical specimens, paints, melting ice, burning leaves or whatever the challenge.

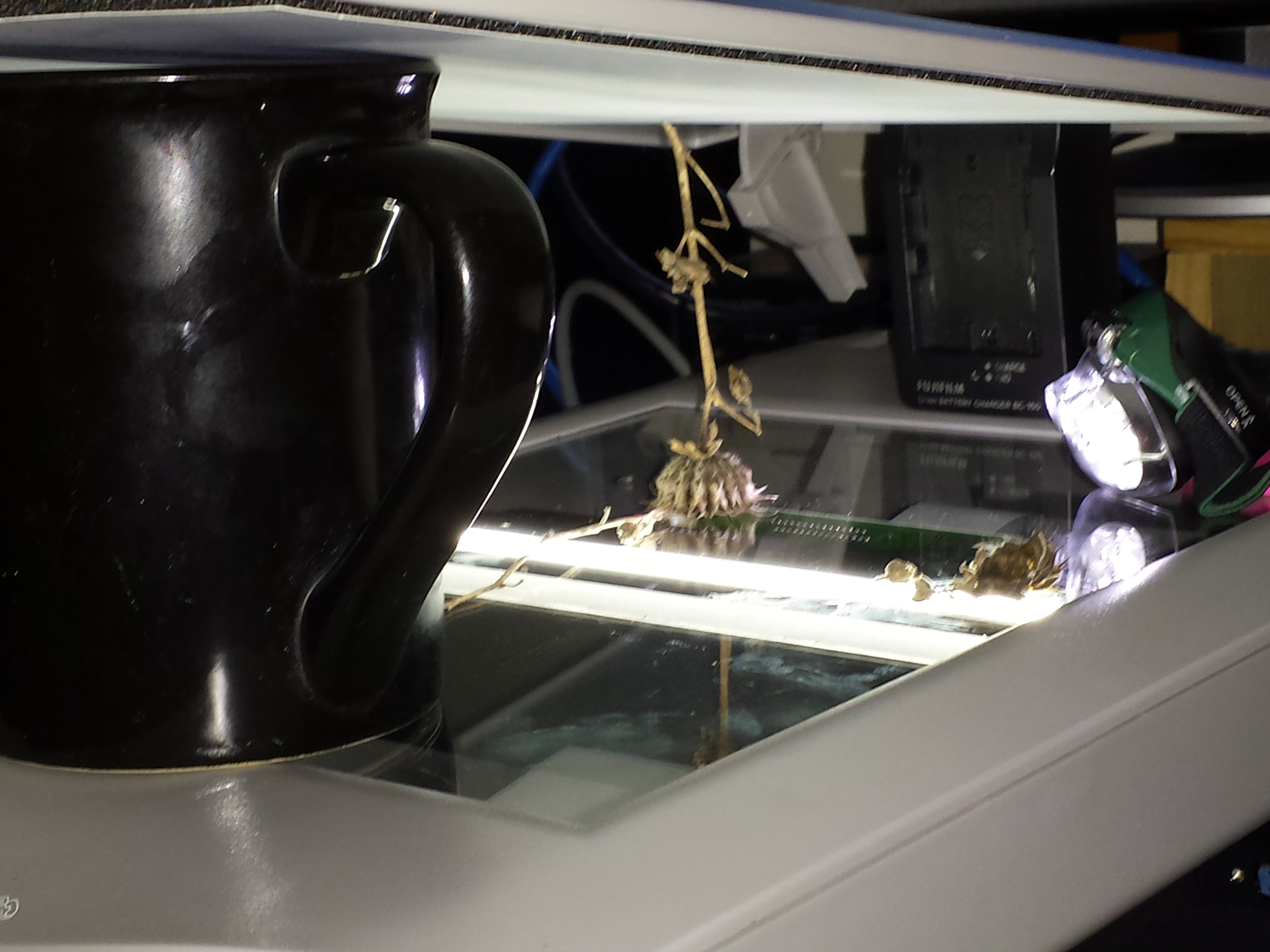
Propping the cover open and adding an external light source

There are only two standard flatbed scanner sizes: "document" (slightly larger than a sheet of letterhead size paper and "large format" approximately the size of two sheets of paper side-by-side. Many scanners advertise two resolutions, an optical resolution and a higher resolution that is achieved by interpolation. A higher optical resolution is desirable, since that captures more data, while interpolation can actually result in reduced quality. The higher the resolution (meaning the number of pixels per inch, "ppi"), the larger the print size.

Flatbed scanners typically have a hinged cover that covers the bed, and reflects light back into the scan head. This cover is usually removed or propped open when scanning 3-D objects, to prevent damage or compression of the subject. Removal of the cover also allows the artist to use additional light sources positioned above the bed, which can be used to enhance the depth captured by the scanner.

Scanners can also be modified to provide additional capture abilities. For example, the scanner, with the illumination removed or disabled, can be used as a giant CCD replacement, producing a large format digital camera back at a fraction of the cost of professional large format systems.

=== Techniques ===
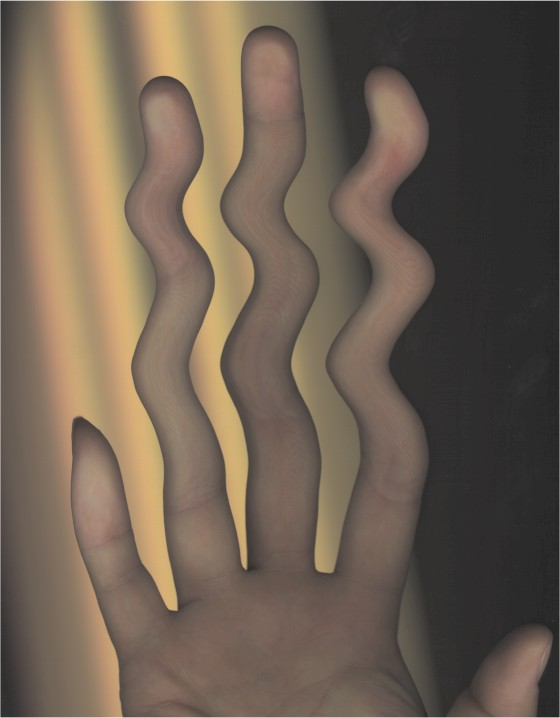
An external light source and a moving subject produce different effects in this image.

The simplest use of the scanner, which also most closely matches its use for document capture, is as a specialized tool for macro photography. As long as the subject can be placed on the scanner bed, the scanner is excellent for capturing very high resolution images, within its limitations. This also has a very practical application, as it can be used to make images of items being sold on auction sites such as eBay which are too small to be easily photographed with consumer level digital cameras.

A common artistic use of the scanner is to capture collages of objects. The objects are arranged by the artist on the scanner bed, and then captured. Since the artist is working from the back of the image, it can be difficult to get the desired arrangement. Scanning software with the ability to generate a low resolution preview scan can help in obtaining the desired arrangement before the final, high resolution scan is made.

Since the subjects are often placed in contact with the scanner, there is a high potential for damage to the scanner from objects scratching or cracking the surface of the bed, or from liquids that might seep from the subject into the interior of the scanner. These risks can be mitigated by placing a layer of transparent protective material, such as clear plastic film, onto the scanner bed. Another approach is to invert the scanner, so the bed is above the subject and not quite in contact with it.

Capturing a moving subject with the scanner can be viewed as a problem, or as an opportunity for artistic effect. As the subject moves during the scan, distortions are caused along the axis of the scan head's movement, as it captures different periods of the subject's movement line by line in a manner similar to slit-scan photography; these are forms of strip photography. The artist can use this by aligning the direction of the scan head's movement to deliberately cause the desired distortion.

==== Stereoscopic scanning ====
Stereo image
Left frame
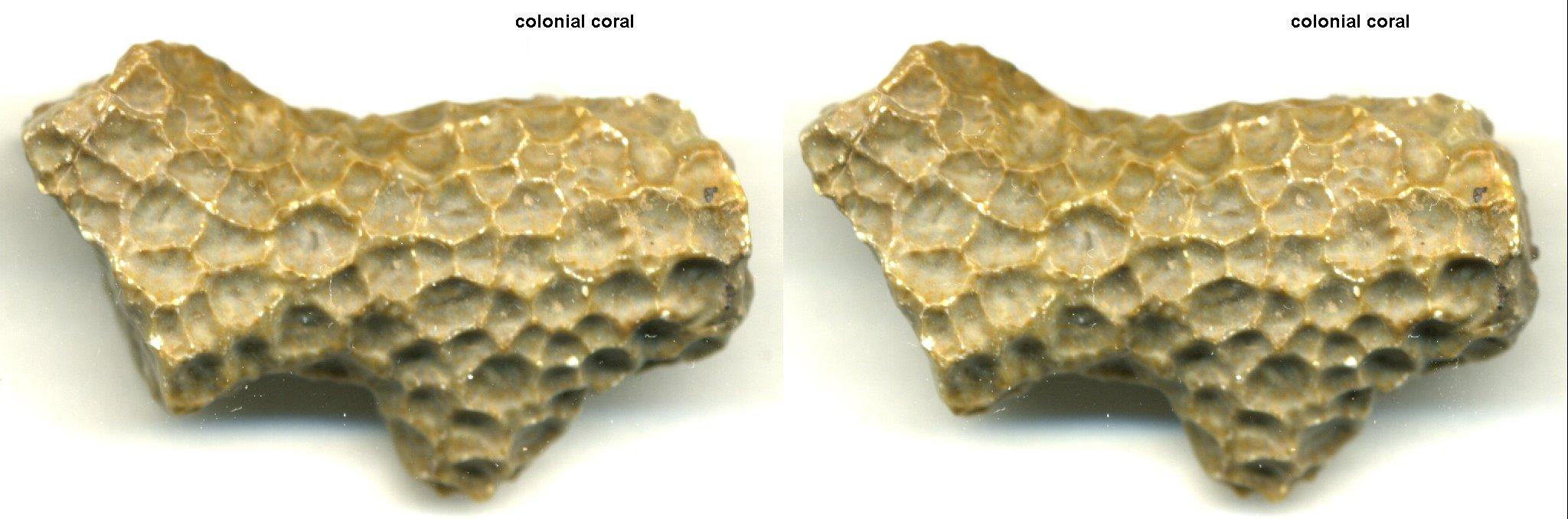
Right frame
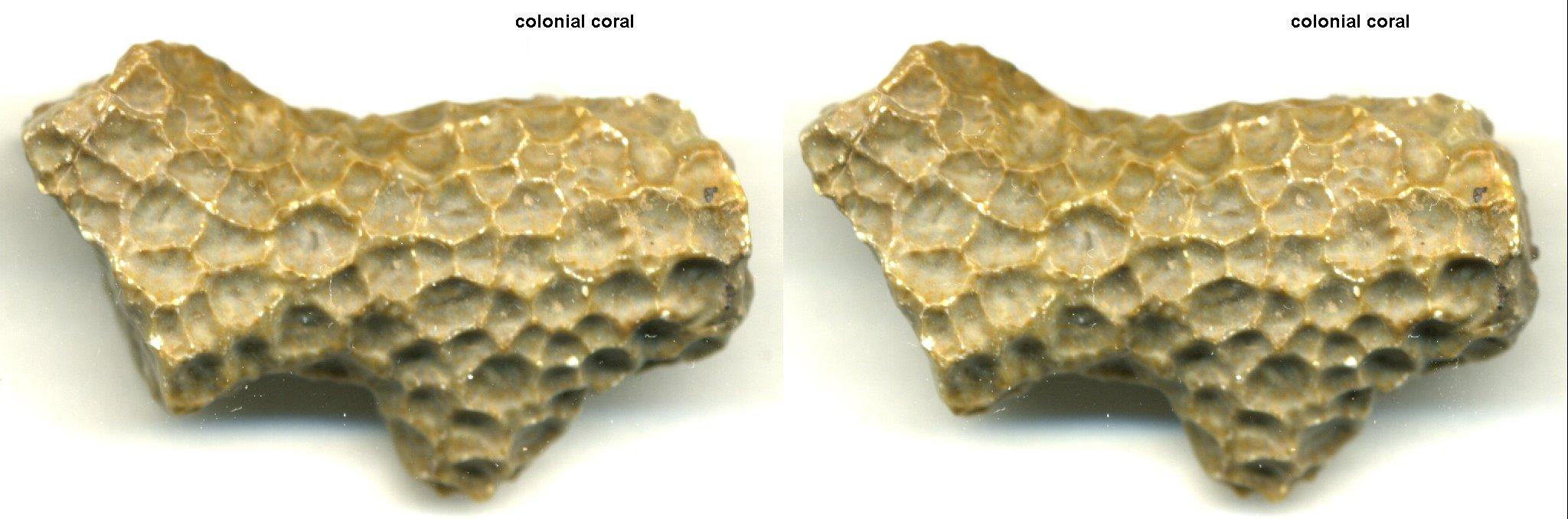
Parallel view
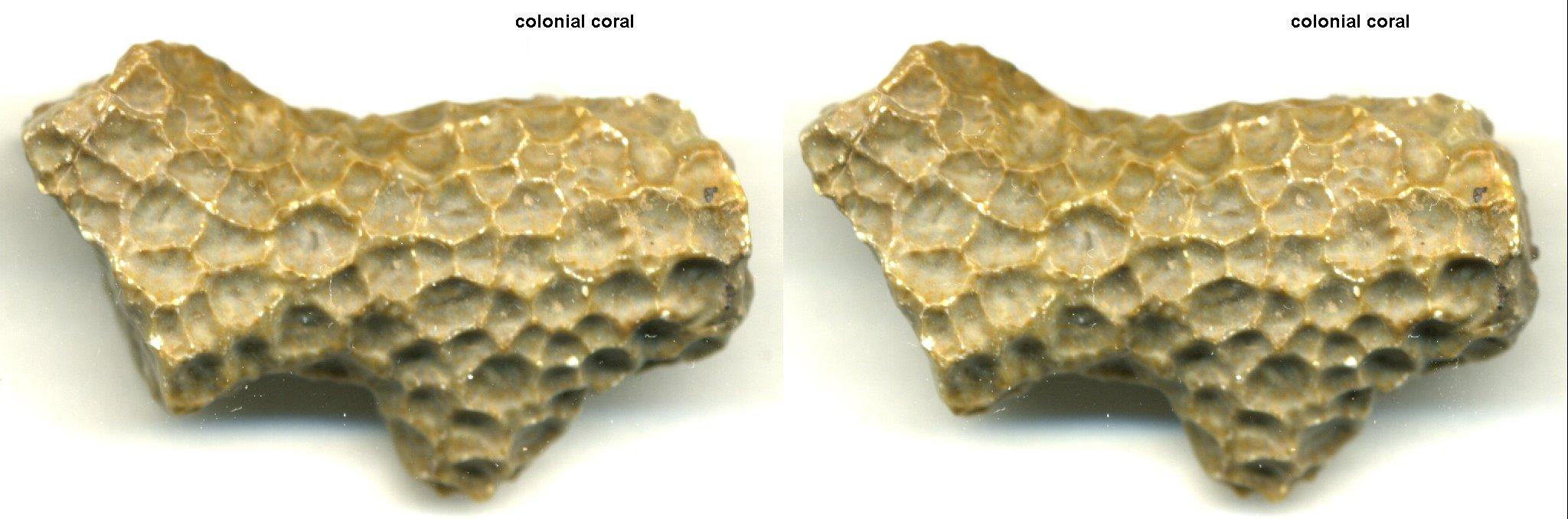
Cross-eye view
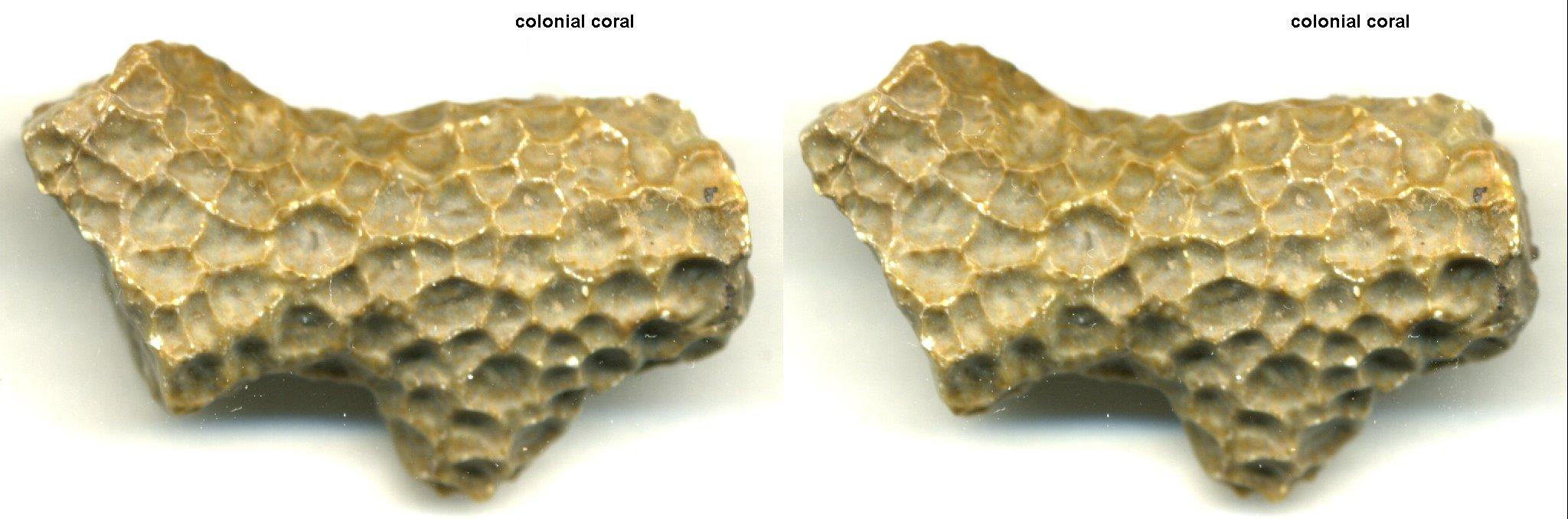

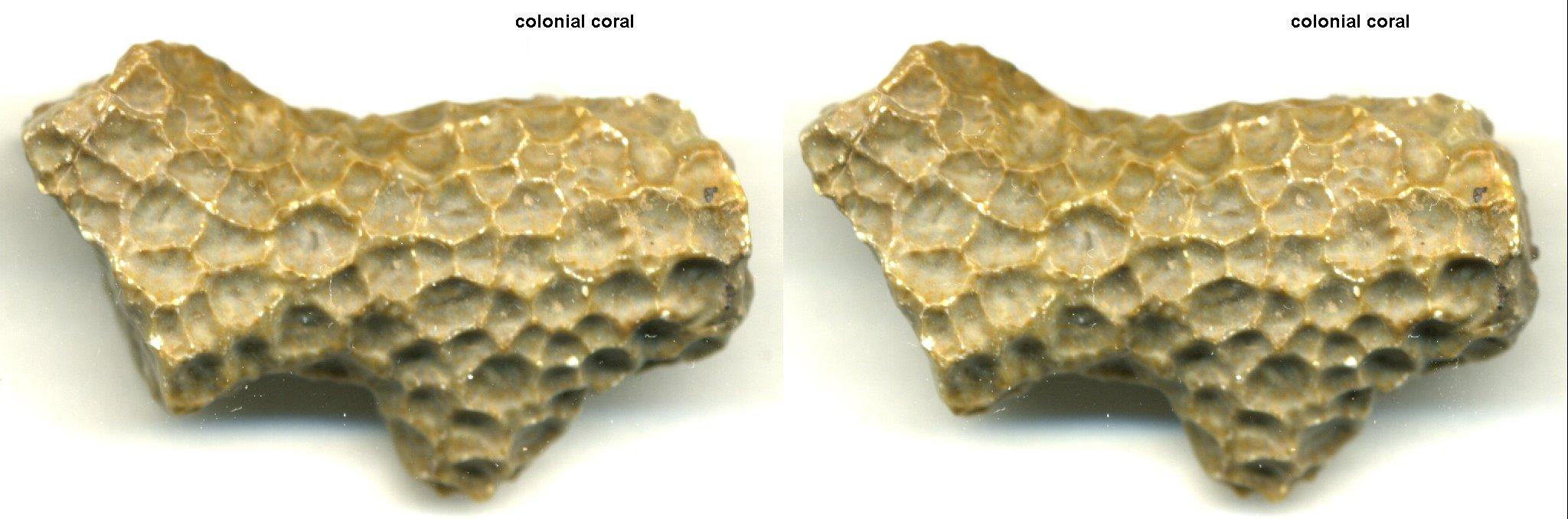
- Favosites fossil imaged using this technique.

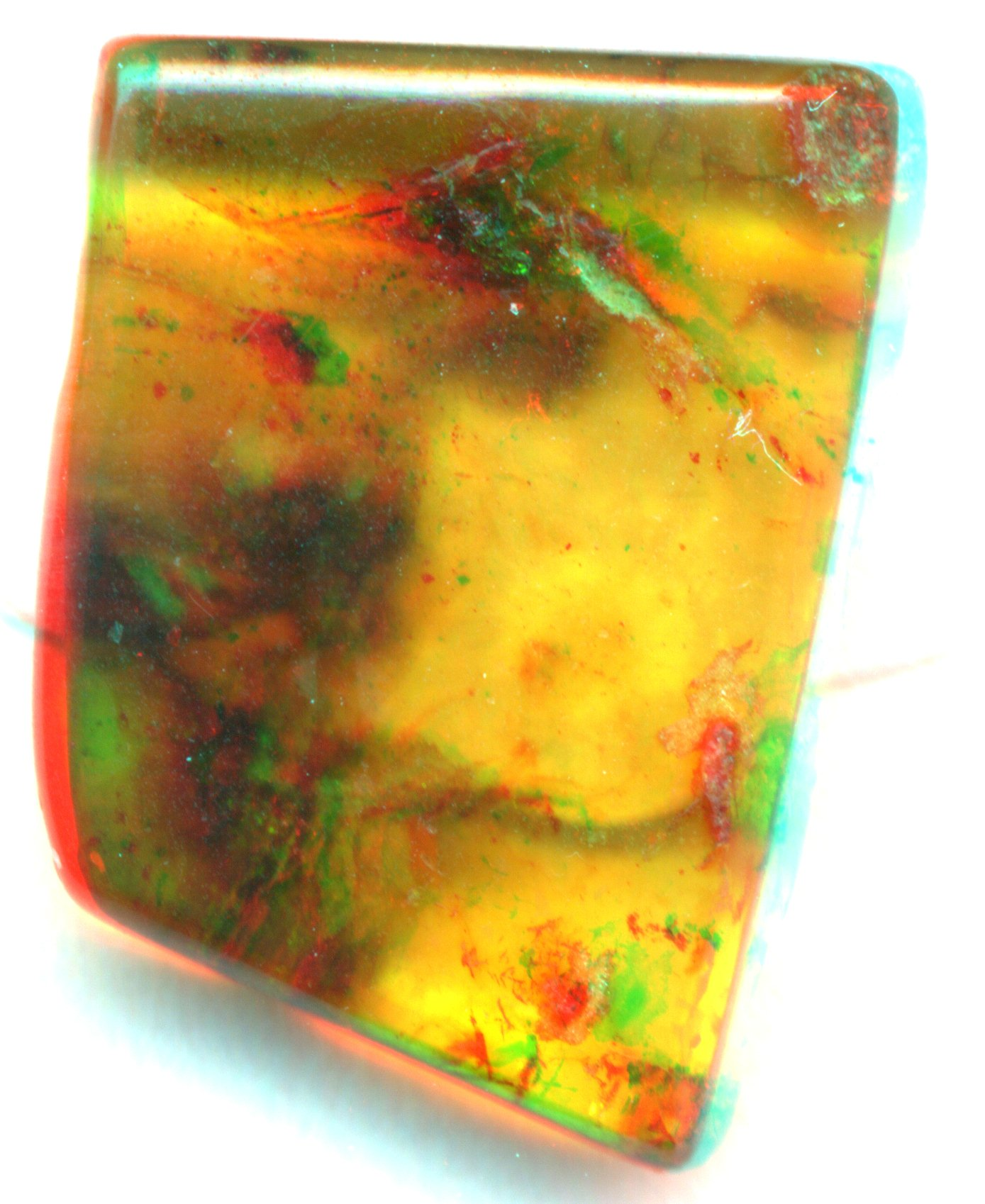
A piece of amber imaged with this technique. Looking at such an image on a high resolution screen or printout allows studying fine details in a way not otherwise possible. Anaglyph, Red left.

A variation of macrophotography involves using the scanner to produce stereoscopic or "3D" images of small objects. This is made possible because of the optical system of a typical scanner, which uses prisms to put the sensor at an optical distance from the glass of 3 to 4 feet, allowing a small sensor to cover the entire width of the bed, while keeping the bed physically shallow. This also gives better than expected depth of field, and introduces a certain amount of parallax when the same object appears at different positions on the bed. This allows the generation of stereo pairs, much like the "shift" technique where a single camera is shifted to produce right and left views of a still life scene.

This technique probably goes back to the earliest days of flatbed scanners and was mentioned on the photo-3D mail list by Bob Weir on December 14, 1995, though he makes vague reference to earlier experiments by others. Though it could be described as a trivial application of a centuries-old technique to a new device, the concept is not widely known, even among stereo photography enthusiasts. This may be due to the common misconception that the typical flatbed scanner uses an imager that spans the width of the bed, thus leading to the assumption that shifting objects would not produce parallax.

The most basic version of this technique involves simply placing the object upside down on the scanner and moving it by hand, but this leads to irregularities between the two images. Better results can be obtained by placing the object in a glass front display box and sliding the box against a straight edge. Smaller objects such as seeds can be placed on a microscope slide and secured using small adhesive labels. Another, more involved technique is to remove the lid and turn the scanner upside down, then move the scanner rather than the subject. This allows the imaging of extremely flexible objects as well as objects such as small plants which cannot be turned upside down. A variation of this method was used in a patented system which involved mechanically moving an inverted scanner to generate multiple views to produce 3D lenticular artwork. This was marketed briefly as a "lenticular starter kit." The product has since been discontinued but the inventor continues to use it to produce his own artwork.

Images generated this way can be edited with stereo imaging software and viewed as traditional stereo pairs or can be converted to any of a number of formats, including anaglyphs, which are viewed using common bicolor 3D glasses, such as those often used with 3D TV and printed materials. Anaglyphs can be printed with normal printers and used as 3D posters.

The high resolution of consumer level flatbed scanners allows taking stereoscopic images of objects that would otherwise be possible only through a stereo microscope, with similar limitations involving depth of field. The scanner, of course, does not feature adjustable focus, so the sharpest focus will always be closest to the glass.

A wide variety of objects have been stereographed in this fashion, including figurines, fulgurites, fossils, mineral specimens seeds, and coins.

== Further manipulation ==
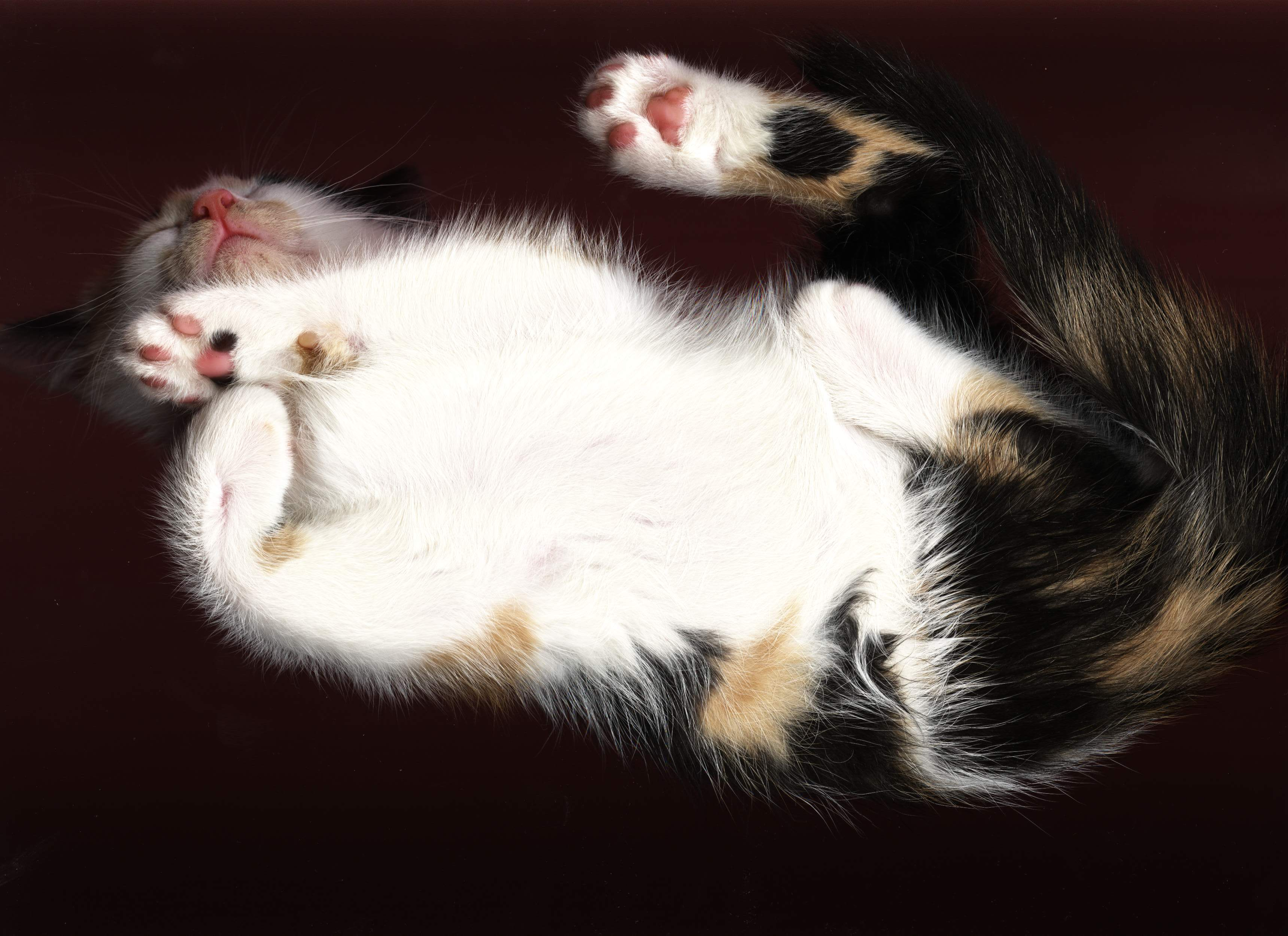
An apparently floating cat scan

While the result of a scanner capture provides a work of digital art or media art, just as a digital photograph does, further manipulation of the captured image is possible as well. This may be as simple as flattening the background to enhance the "floating" effect provided by the scanner to complete reworking of the image/photograph.

== See also ==
- Digital art
- Digital image
- Digital photography
