= John G. Zimmerman =

American photographer (1927–2002)

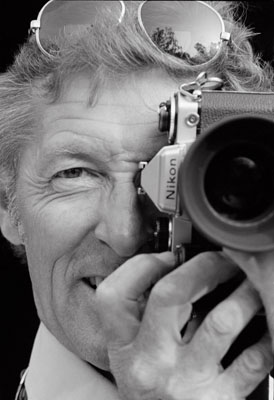
- Born: October 30, 1927; Pacoima, California, U.S.
- Died: August 3, 2002 (aged 74); Monterey, California, U.S.
- Occupation: Photographer
- Website: www.johngzimmerman.com

John Gerald Zimmerman (30 October 1927 in Pacoima, California – 3 August 2002 in Monterey, California) was an American photographer. He was among the first sports photographers to use remote controlled cameras for unique camera placements, and was "a pioneer in the use of motor-driven camera sequences, slit cameras and double-shutter designs to show athletes in motion."

== Early life and early career ==
Zimmerman was interested in photography from an early age. His father, John L. Zimmerman, a gaffer at Metro-Goldwyn-Mayer Studios, taught him the basics and bought him a 4×5 view camera. He joined a photographic hobby club in junior high school and spent afternoons developing film with friends in their mothers’ kitchens.

Zimmerman took a three-year photography course at John C. Fremont High School in Los Angeles, where he was taught by Hollywood cinematographer Clarence Bach.

After graduating from high school, Zimmerman was a Navy photographer. In 1950, he landed a job as a staff photographer at the Time bureau in Washington, D.C. On his first assignment on November 1, 1950, Zimmerman was driving away from the White House with a group of photographers when two Puerto Rican nationalists stormed nearby Blair House, attempting to assassinate President Truman. Hearing gunshots, the photographers rushed out of the car. Zimmerman had a camera around his neck, whereas the others had locked theirs in the trunk. Zimmerman got the first photos of the attack, which were published in both Time and Life.

In 1952, Zimmerman moved to Atlanta. During his time there he shot a series of noteworthy assignments for Ebony depicting the experiences of African Americans in the Jim Crow South and the Midwest.

By 1954 he had moved to Detroit and was freelancing for Life. One assignment required him to document Detroit's old Mariners' Church being moved to a new location across town. The building's move took four weeks to complete, yet Zimmerman's photo gives the effect of the church hurtling through downtown Detroit at top speed. The use of technology to show on film what the naked eye could not see would become a hallmark of Zimmerman's work.

== Sports Illustrated, 1956–1963 ==
Zimmerman's approach caught the eye of Gerald Astor, Picture Editor of the newly founded Sports Illustrated. Astor hired Zimmerman in 1956 as one of the magazine's first staff photographers. Zimmerman helped make the magazine a vanguard of innovative sports photography. He was among the first to use remote controlled cameras for unique camera placements, and was "a pioneer in the use of motor-driven camera sequences, slit cameras and double-shutter designs to show athletes in motion."

Sports Illustrated photographer Walter Iooss recalled watching Zimmerman edit photographs of basketball player Wilt Chamberlain in 1961. “It was the first time a photojournalist had placed a camera above the rim of a basket…it was like looking at something from another planet. It had never been done before. No one had seen the game from there.”

By the time Zimmerman left Sports Illustrated in 1963, he had assembled a portfolio that showed all the elements of his unique photographic style. He had discovered new ways to portray his subjects, often stretching and blurring his images to show the athletes in motion. Zimmerman photographed Philadelphia Eagles Chuck Bednarik’s tackle of New York Giants running back Frank Gifford in 1960.

== Editorial and commercial work, 1964–1991 ==
From 1964 until his retirement in 1991, Zimmerman worked for all the major magazines, covering notable subjects from every aspect of American popular culture. Four of his Time covers are in the Smithsonian’s National Portrait Gallery: politician Jerry Brown, baseball player Rod Carew, actress Diane Lane and Olympic figure skater Dorothy Hamill.

Photographing the Olympic Games was a constant throughout his career. He covered six Summer Olympic Games, the first in Melbourne (1956) and the last in Los Angeles (1984), with four Winter Olympic Games in between.

One of Zimmerman’s favorite Olympic assignments was taking the "Big Picture" for the LA Olympics in 1984. The "Big Picture" was a group portrait of 18,000 people, ranging from Mayor Tom Bradley, local community leaders, celebrities, the City Ballet and L.A. Dodgers to the UCLA Football team. It was displayed as a 30 × 80 ft. billboard at various places around the city, to welcome visitors and athletes to the Games.

On meeting Zimmerman in 1972 sports photographer Rich Clarkson said:

I had known and admired him for years, watching how he did things technically that no one had ever tried before - such as modifying a Hulcher to produce beautiful pictures of runners with colors streaking from behind them as they ran. John did this at the Olympic trials in Eugene, Or. and believe it or not, he put up a black background and lights on a curve and did this very stylized illustration during an actual competition. The pictures were beautiful.

Beginning in the 1970s, Zimmerman worked in the more lucrative arena of print advertising and photographed advertising campaigns for Marlboro, Ford, Chrysler, AT&T, Exxon, G.E., Pepsi and Coca-Cola, among others.

Summing up Zimmerman's career in a 2003 tribute, photographer Neil Leifer wrote:

John was a master of lighting, whether the subject was a 20,000 seat arena or Christie Brinkley on a beach. He was at ease shooting in 35mm or large format, as adept with wide-angle lenses as he was with telephotos. I put him up there with Avedon, Leibovitz, Penn, and Adams.

== Other ==
Zimmerman's work has been exhibited at numerous museums, including the International Center of Photography, Center for Photographic Art, the Newseum and the Art Institute of Chicago.

Zimmerman's Estate belongs to the American Photography Archives Group, "...a resource organization for individuals who own or manage a privately held photography archive."

== Publications ==
- The Great Life Photographers. New York: Little, Brown and Company, 2010. ISBN 0316097934. With an introduction by John Loengard and a reminiscence by Gordon Parks.
- Sports Illustrated: The Hockey Book. New York: Sports Illustrated, 2010. ISBN 1603201513.
- America in Black & White: Selected Photographs of John G. Zimmerman. Arne De Winde, et al., Hannibal Press, 2017. ISBN 978-9492081766
- Masters of Contemporary Photography: Photographing Sports. Capturing the Excitement of People in Action. John G. Zimmerman, Mark Kauffman and Neil Leifer. Alskog, 1975. ISBN 0-87100-094-6.
- Arthur Ashe: Crossing the Line. Photographs by Zimmerman. Hannibal Press, 2018. ISBN 9492677504.
