= Strip aerial photography =

Method of aerial photography

Strip aerial photography (or aerial strip photography, or continuous strip photography) is a method of aerial photography that uses a high-speed, low-altitude aircraft to take a continuous picture – a form of strip photography – rather than using overlapping high-altitude photographs, as in conventional aerial photography. Popular from the 1940s to 1970s, strip aerial photography was once used internationally for aerial mapping and surveys of highway degradation, but has been replaced by satellite photography, which is less expensive and less prone to image artifacts that required complex post-processing to remove.

== Sources ==
- Hittle, J. E. (23 April 1947). "THE APPLICATION OF AERIAL STRIP PHOTOGRAPHY TO HIGHWAY AND AIRPORT ENGINEERING". Highway Research Board Proceedings. 26 – via pubsindex.trb.org. The Application of Aerial Strip Photograph to Highway and Airport Engineering
