= Neil Leifer =

American photographer

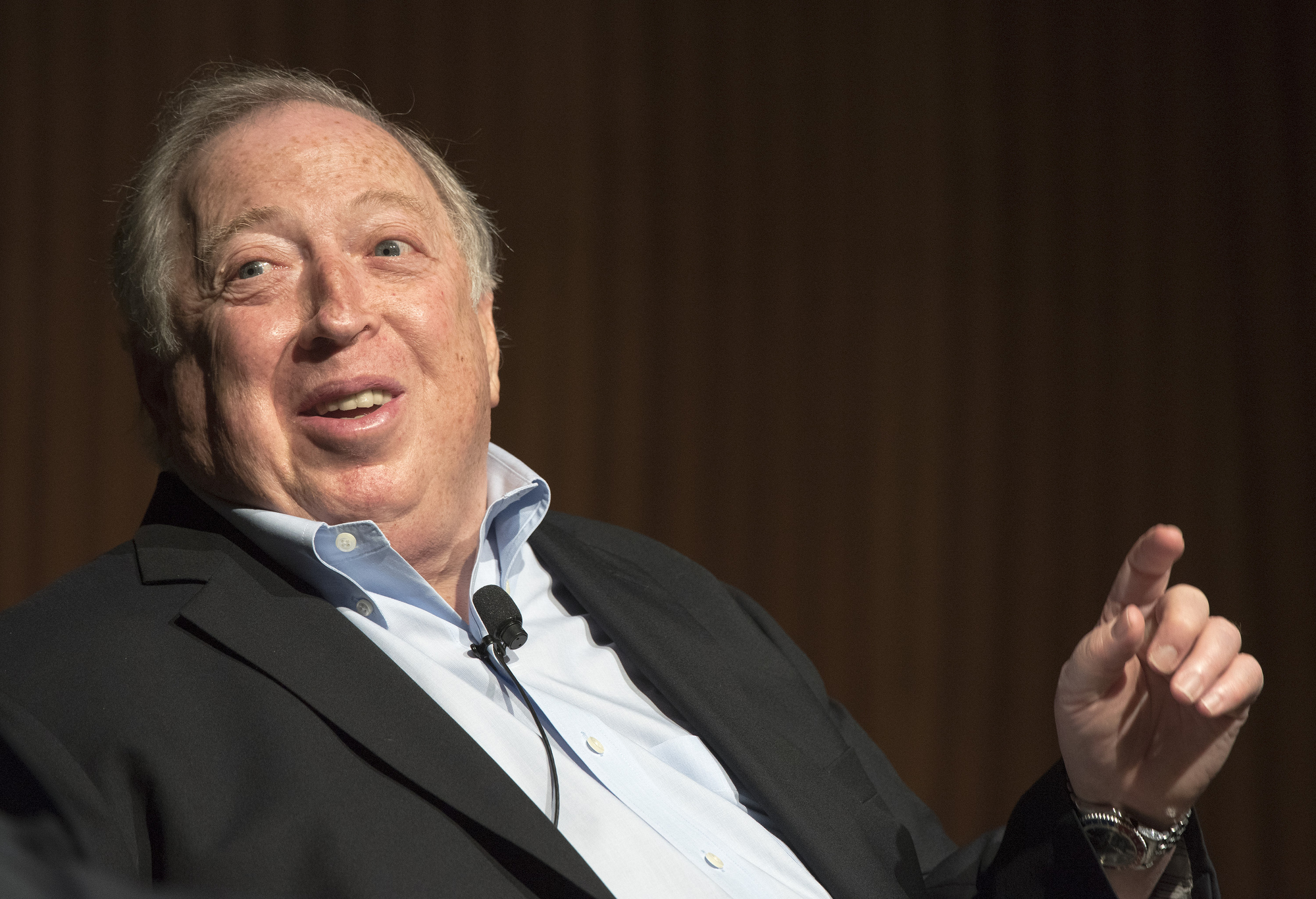
- Leifer in 2016
- Born: December 28, 1942 (age 83); New York City, U.S.
- Occupation: Photographer
- Employer(s): Sports Illustrated, Time
- Known for: Photo of Muhammad Ali standing over Sonny Liston
- Website: neilleifer.com

Neil Leifer (born December 28, 1942) is an American sports photographer and filmmaker known mainly for his work with Sports Illustrated and Time. His photograph of Muhammad Ali standing over Sonny Liston, taken on May 25, 1965, in Lewiston, Maine, "is considered by many to be the greatest sports photo of all time."

== Early life and education ==
Neil Leifer grew up in a Jewish family on the Lower East Side of Manhattan in New York City. At the age of thirteen, Leifer was introduced to photography through the Henry Street Settlement House, which offered free classes to the poor children of the neighborhood. Leifer began taking sports pictures, since it combined the two things that he liked. Along with Leifer, the photography group at the Settlement House produced three other photographers: John Iacono, Manny Millan, and Stanley Kubrick.

When he was not doing photography in his youth, Leifer had all sorts of odd jobs, such as shining shoes and delivering sandwiches. Eventually, he saved enough money to buy his first camera.

== Career ==
=== Early career ===
As a boy in New York City, Leifer would gain free admission to New York Giants games by pushing the wheelchairs of handicapped patrons into the stadium. Using his free ticket and a camera, he would then position himself on the field with the photographers. Leifer gained free admission to the December 28, 1958 NFL title game between the Giants and Baltimore Colts. This game became famous as the first overtime game in league history, and is often referred to as the "Greatest Game Ever Played." Leifer, on his sixteenth birthday, caught several images of the game-winning touchdown which he sold to Sports Illustrated. Sports Illustrated's editors liked Leifer's work and he quickly became a boy wonder at the magazine. He had his first cover shot in 1962 at age 19.

=== Sports Illustrated ===
Leifer was one of only two photographers with color film in his camera when Muhammad Ali knocked out Sonny Liston in Lewiston, Maine, on May 25, 1965, in the bout known as Ali vs. Liston II. His photograph of Ali standing over Liston became one of the most widely recognized images in sports photography, and has been described as one of the greatest sports photographs in history.

Leifer was also known for taking risks. For the 1966 heavyweight title fight between Ali and Cleveland Williams at the Astrodome in Houston, Leifer placed a camera in the rafters above the ring to photograph the canvas from overhead. The resulting image of Ali and Williams was later described by Leifer as his favorite photograph from his professional career, and was voted the greatest sports photograph by The Observer.

Leifer frequently used strip photography, a demanding technique, in the 1970s for athletes including Gaylord Perry and Billy Kidd, and for sports such as IndyCar racing.

=== Time magazine ===
In 1978, Leifer left sports for a wider range of assignments with Time magazine and produced 40 covers for the magazine. His cover subjects have included, President Ronald Reagan and Vice President George Bush, Alabama football coach Bear Bryant, National Rifle Association President Joe Foss, Statue of Liberty's 100th birthday celebration, actors Burt Reynolds and Clint Eastwood, Pope John Paul II's visit to America, Heavyweight Champion Mike Tyson, New York City Mayor Ed Koch, The Space Shuttle Columbia, President Jimmy Carter, The Animals of Africa, Olympian Carl Lewis, and actor Paul Newman.

In 1992, Leifer covered both the Winter Olympic Games in Albertville, France and the Summer Olympic Games in Barcelona, Spain. The 2000 Summer Olympic Games in Sydney, Australia was the fifteenth Olympic Games he has covered.

In later years, Leifer gradually reduced his photography workload, turning his attention to films, although he has been known to come out of retirement for a special cover shoot for Sports Illustrated on rare occasions.

=== Filmmaker and documentarian ===
In recent years, Leifer has focused his creativity to the moving image. He is the director, producer and often writer, of noteworthy film including features, shorts, and documentaries.

In 2007, Leifer was shortlisted for the documentary film short Oscar for Portraits of a Lady which he directed, and co-produced with Walter Bernard.

== Books ==
The Best of Leifer (2001) is a retrospective of Leifer's 40 years as a photojournalist and showcases the best of his sports and non-sports photographs. Neil Leifer, Ballet in the Dirt: The Golden Age of Baseball (2007) is a collection of Leifer's baseball photographs of the 1960s and 1970s, the “Golden Age of Baseball”. Guts and Glory: The Golden Age of American Football 1958–1978 (2008) is a collection of Leifer's football photographs of the late 1950s, 1960s and 1970s. In Relentless: The Stories behind the Photographs (2016) Leifer gives a behind the scenes look at the stories behind fifty of his most iconic pictures.

- 1969 Dreadnought Returns Baum, Printing House
- 1970 Dreadnought Farewell, Kaye
- 1976 The Mark Spitz Complete Book of Swimming Crowell
- 1979 Sports Abrams
- 1985 Neil Leifer's Sports Stars, Doubleday
- 1987 US Naval Airpower – Supercarrier in Action, Motorbooks
- 1988 USS New Jersey – The Navy's Big Guns: From Mothballs to Vietnam, Motorbooks
- 1988 USS New Jersey – World War II To The Persian Gulf, Motorbooks
- 1991 Muhammad Ali – Memories, Rizzoli
- 1992 Safari, Reader's Digest
- 1992 Sports, HarperCollins
- 2001 The Best of Leifer, Abbeville
- 2003 Neil Leifer: Portraits (with an introduction by Tom Brokaw), St. Ann's
- 2004 G.O.A.T. (Leifer was one of 2 principal photographers), Taschen
- 2006 A Year in Sports (with an introduction by Frank Deford), Abbeville
- 2007 Neil Leifer, Ballet in the Dirt: The Golden Age of Baseball (with an introduction by Ron Shelton), Taschen *2008 Neil Leifer, Guts and Glory: The Golden Age of American Football, 1958–1979 (with an introduction by Jim Murray), Taschen
- 2016 Relentless: The Stories behind the Photographs, University of Texas Press

== The Neil Leifer Picture Collection ==
The Neil Leifer Picture Collection contains photographs, in black and white and in color, taken over a 45-year period (mainly in the 1960s, 1970s and 1980s) at various major sporting events throughout the world.

== Recognition ==
Neil Leifer was inducted into the International Boxing Hall of Fame in 2014, becoming the first photographer to be elected to a professional sports hall of fame.
