= Strip photography =

Type of photographic technique

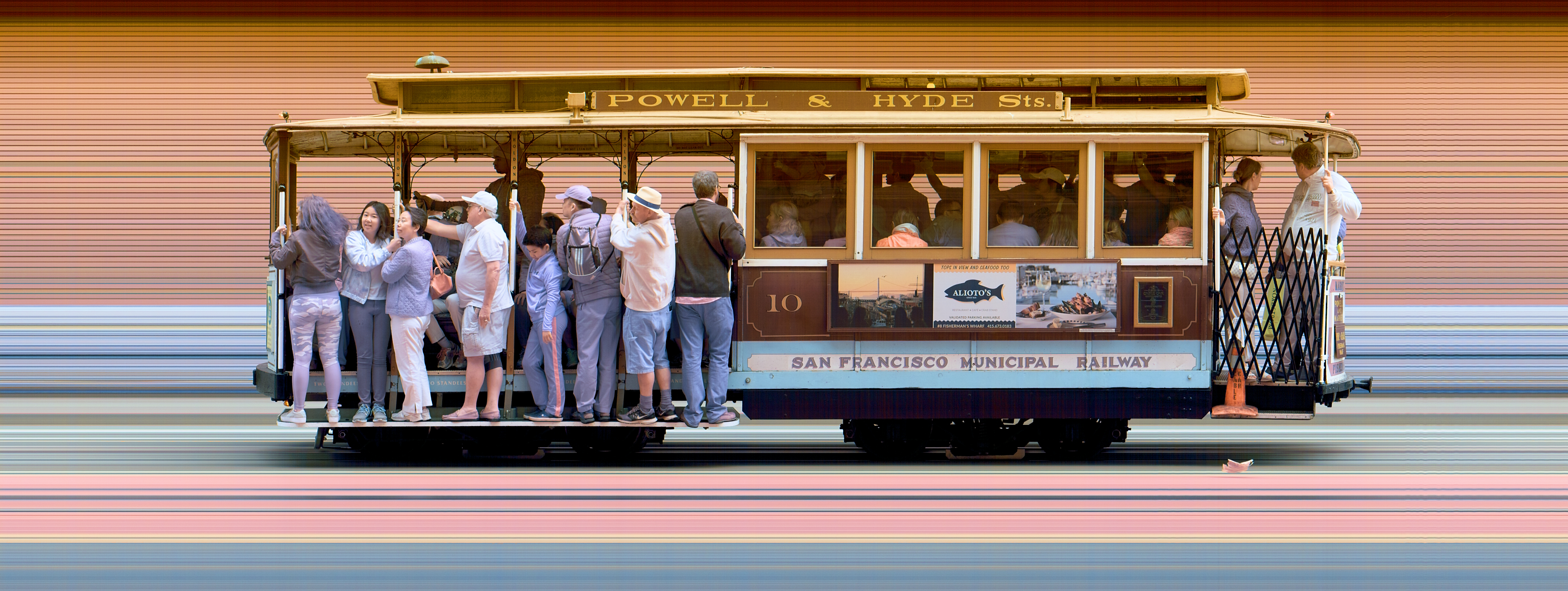
Fixed slit photo of a San Francisco cable car, showing prominent striped background. The vertical axis of the photo is a spatial dimension as with normal photos, but the horizontal axis is a time axis, showing the same point on the street as the cable car passed.

Principle of operation of strip photography showing why the background is streaked

Strip photography, or slit photography, is a photographic technique of capturing a two-dimensional image as a sequence of one-dimensional images over time, in contrast to a normal photo which is a single two-dimensional image (the full field) at one point in time. A moving scene is recorded, over a period of time, using a camera that observes a narrow strip rather than the full field. If the subject is moving through this observed strip at constant speed, they will appear in the finished photo as a visible object. Stationary objects, like the background, will be the same the whole way across the photo and appear as stripes along the time axis; see examples on this page.

The image can be understood as a collection of thin vertical or horizontal strips patched together, hence the name. Digital sensors do produce discrete strips of pixels that are captured and arranged one line at a time. In film photography, the image is instead produced continuously, so there are no discrete strips, just a smooth gradation.

== Implementation ==
Many photographic devices use a form of strip photography due to the use of a rolling shutter for engineering reasons, and exhibit similar effects. This is common both on cheaper cameras with an electronic shutter (more sophisticated electronic shutters are global, not rolling), as well as cameras with mechanical focal-plane shutters.

This technique can be implemented in multiple ways. In film photography, a camera with a vertical slit aperture can either have fixed film and a moving slit, or a fixed slit and moving film. In digital photography, one can use a line sensor, generally one that is moving, as in a rotating line camera, but also an image scanner (flatbed or hand).

== Aesthetics ==
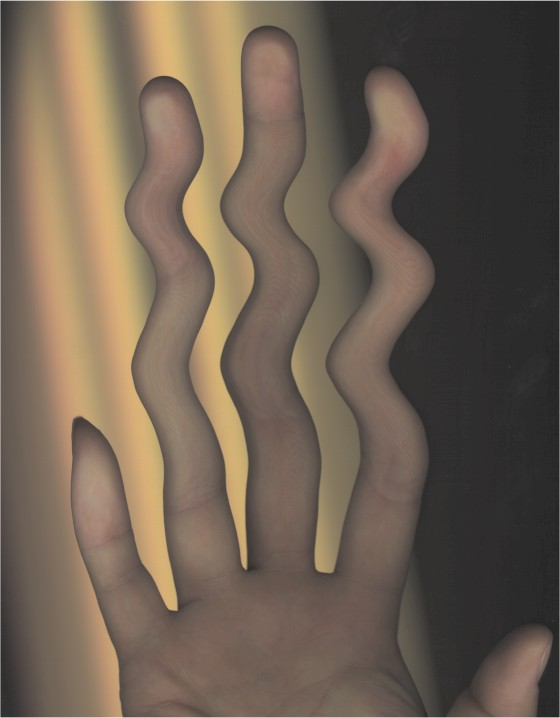
Scanography

The fundamental property of strip photography is that one axis of the photo shows the scene changing over time, while the other axis does not. The simplest method of this is recording a stationary slice, perpendicular to the frame, so one axis of the photo is a spatial dimension (along the slit) and the opposite axis represents time (along the exposure time). For example, a photo finish shows one strip (e.g., the finish line) over time, where the scanning direction (e.g., horizontal) represents time, not space.

If the camera moves during the shot, like when taking a panoramic photo, there is no longer just one space axis and one time axis. Instead, for the example of a camera moving horizontally from left to right to take a panoramic shot of a landscape, the vertical axis is still just a spatial axis, but as you look from left to right along the photo, you see an image that is both further to the right of the subject (a spatial dimension) and later in the shot (the time dimension). The vertical axis of the photo is therefore a mixed spatial and time axis, and the panorama represents a period of time not a single instant in time.

=== Characteristics ===
Strip photography has a number of distinctive characteristics, particularly fixed slit.

==== Distortion ====
Moving objects are distorted based on the relative speed of their motion and the image capture. For objects moving in a fixed direction at a constant or almost constant rate, as is the case of racing photographs, notably photo finishes, this yields an approximately constant rate of distortion, so the image is stretched or compressed. If the speeds are in (approximate) sync, which can be done for racing, the image can look almost undistorted.

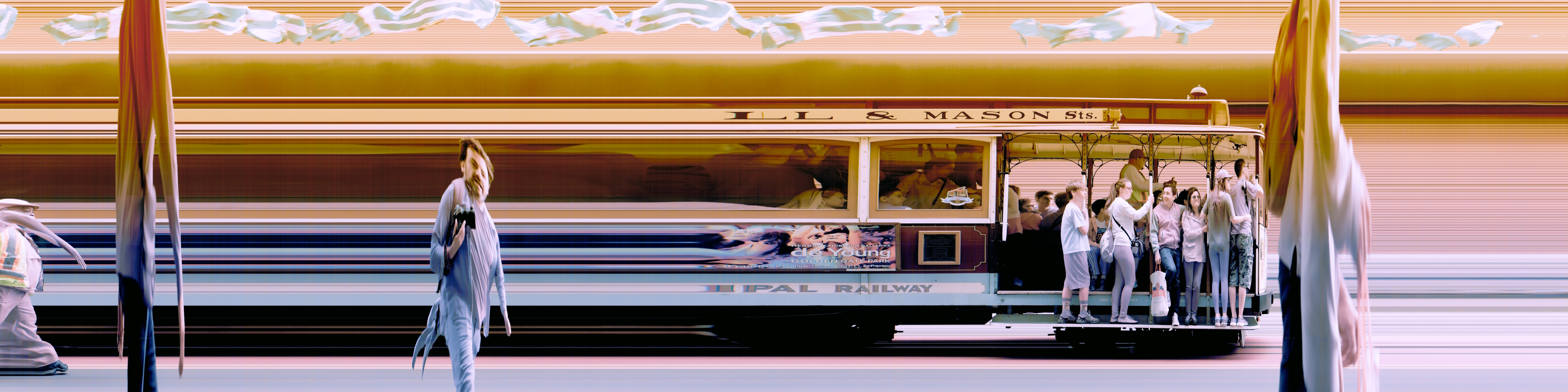
With fixed slit photography, entities with changing speeds can appear severely distorted.

In strip photography, distance is interchanged (or mixed) with time, so width in the scanning direction (say, horizontal) is proportional to time, and thus inversely proportional to speed. Slower-moving objects occupy more time, and thus appear wider, while faster-moving objects are narrower, as they occupy the slit for a shorter period of time. In extreme cases a very rapidly moving object can be captured for only a single strip or even none at all (if discrete capture, as in a digital camera), while a stationary object (notably background) will appear as a horizontal line (a stripe). These differences are particularly notable in cases of movement at differing constant speeds, such as parallax from a train window or differing speeds of traffic (esp. if in differing directions diagonal to the camera) or people walking. Further, in the case of motion towards or away from the camera, size changes, creating additional distortion.

In the case of diagonal motion in the direction of capture and towards or away from the camera, objects flare (expand vertically and compressing horizontally) as they approach and taper (compress vertically and stretch out horizontally) as they recede; this is because (by perspective) objects appear larger the closer they are (approximately as the inverse of distance), with increase in horizontal size yielding faster movement (parallax) and thus decreased size in the strip photograph. These effects are inverse in magnitude (as horizontal shrinks vertical grows, so area does not change), so objects effectively undergo a squeeze mapping, properly an inhomogeneous squeeze (magnitude of squeeze varies with distance to the camera), hence the flared shapes.

In other cases, however, particularly movement not in the direction of capture, very unusual distortions result, resembling smears. These may be compared with surrealism, such as the work of Pablo Picasso or Salvador Dalí. In cases when the exposure time (for a given location on the sensor) is slow relative to movement, this distortion combines with motion blur, yielding soft blurs.

In the case of runners, the torso will be moving at an approximately constant rate, but the extremities will be moving rapidly in other directions, yielding distorted extremities. Particularly notable are relay runners, due to the combination of regular racing and the irregular transfer.

==== Striped background ====
For fixed slit photography, non-moving objects, particularly in the background, are rendered as a constant stripe, yielding a striped background. For moving objects, the width of the object in the image is inversely proportional to the object's speed relative to the camera as discussed above (i.e. width = constant ÷ speed for some constant); a very slow or stationary object therefore has a very large or unlimited width, which is a stripe.

==== Perspective ====
More subtly, for fixed slit photography, as all capture is in a constant direction, there is no perspective in the image. This is conspicuous in long strips of races, where all the racers are viewed directly from the side, rather than from an angle depending on their position. This effect looks the same as the maximum possible perspective distortion in a photo taken from very far away, in which case perspective flattens ("compression distortion").

==== Changing scene ====
Because the photograph is not at a single instant, the scene can change during the exposure, including such features as duplication of a single object. Notably, extreme ends may be quite separated in time. For example: in a rollout photograph of a head that makes more than one revolution, the subject's expression may change each time; in a race photo, a racer may go behind the camera (or around the track a second time) and pass the finish line repeatedly, or reverse direction and cross the finish line in the opposite direction; in a panoramic photo, a subject (e.g., a person) may be captured at one side, go behind the camera (or behind some opaque part of the scene), and then re-enter the frame and be captured at the other side. Before the digital age, this was a common ploy on school photographs that were taken with a slit camera that rolled across the scene, the film moving by the same mechanism in the reverse direction. It can also be used to tell a temporally authentic story, as in a comic strip – events at one end, and consequences or reactions at the other, later in time and space.

=== Layout ===
Vertical strips – so time is horizontal – is most common, and accords with horizontal scanning, as in reading, though horizontal strips – so time is vertical – are also found. In addition to horizontal and vertical strips, other forms are possible, such as radial strips. Aspect ratio varies, with some photos being similar to ordinary photos ("tableau" format), emphasizing a single image, while others are long ("strip" format), emphasizing the passage of time, as in a (single panel) comic strip or traditional scroll paintings.

== Applications ==
This is most basically used in panoramic photography, to capture a large, static scene that would be difficult to capture via other techniques; scanning cameras are designed for this.

Other applications include:

- Peripheral photography, notably rollout photography
- Photo finish
- Scanography
- Slit-scan photography
- Strip aerial photography
- Synchroballistic photography (in ballistics)

== Sports photography ==
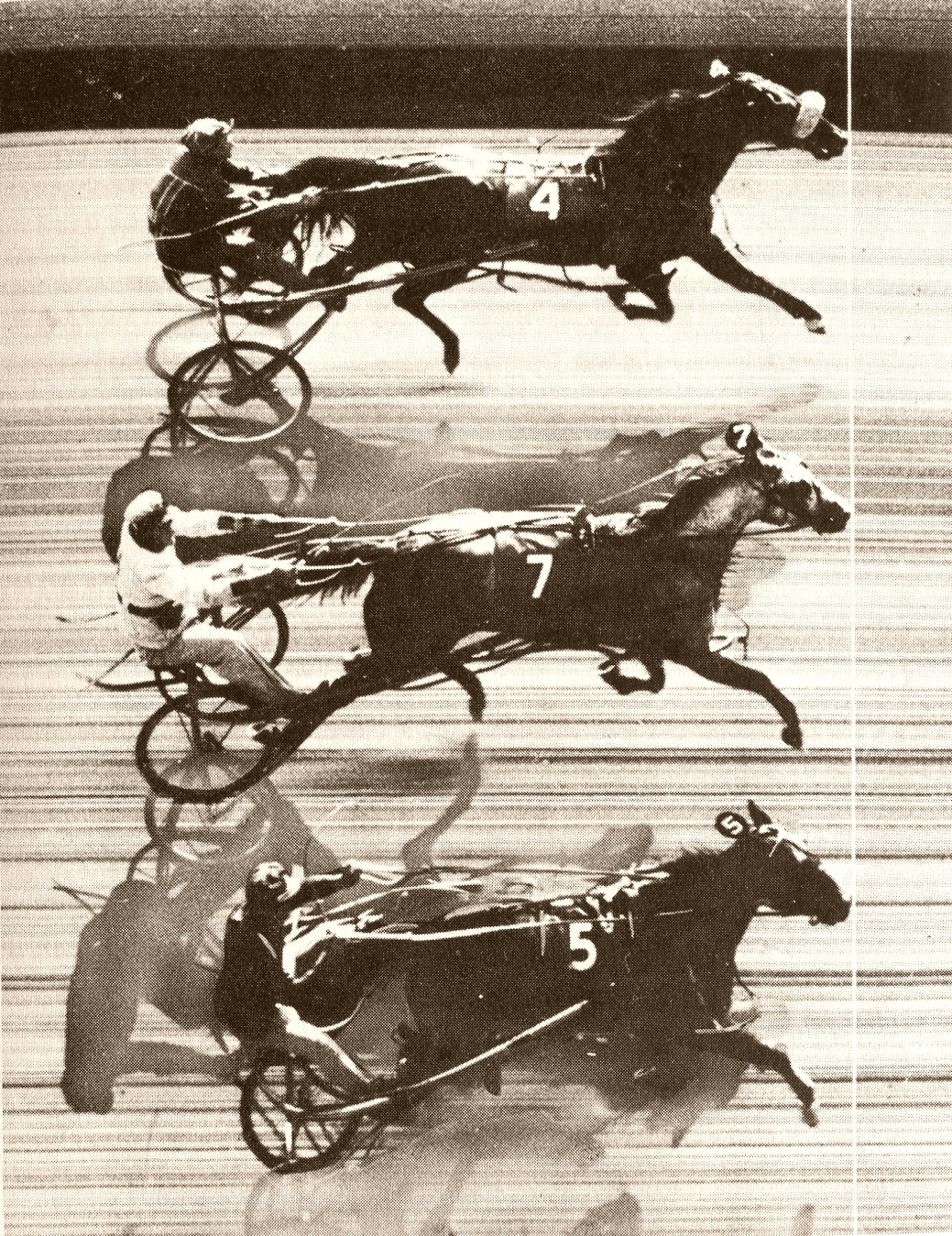
Photo finish

Sports are a common use of strip photography, both for photo finishes and artistic purposes. It is particularly common for racing, where movement is largely regular and predictable, but by no means limited to it. Due to the movement in sports, which is a combination of movement at a regular rate and at a changing rate, various forms of distortion are possible. An early accidental example of distortion is "Grand Prix de Circuit de la Seine" (June 26, 1912) by Jacques Henri Lartigue, where the skew caused by the vertically traveling slit makes the race car appear to lean forward, creating a sense of speed.

Strip photography was notably used by George Silk at the US tryouts for the 1960 Summer Olympics, Further photography at Life and Sports Illustrated that used strip photography included John G. Zimmerman, who borrowed Silk's camera to photograph Pete Rose and later photographed basketball players Nate Archibald and Julius Erving using a slit-scan camera for Sports Illustrated, and Neil Leifer, who used it frequently in the 1970s for athletes including Gaylord Perry and Billy Kidd, and for sports such as IndyCar racing. More recently, Bill Frakes (assisted by David Callow) captured Marion Jones winning the 100m event at the 2000 Summer Olympics using a strip camera.

== Artistic uses ==
Adam Magyar at TEDSalon Berlin 2014
- TED Ideas
- Adam Magyar on August 6, 2014
- http://vimeo.com/1027573848

Strip photography can be used for artistic effect, which has been done regularly since the 1960s. In addition to sports, early examples include work by Silk and other Life (later Time–Life) photographers for various subjects, such as the cover of the Halloween issue of Life 1960. William Larson pioneered modern artistic uses of strip photography from the late 1960s. Michael Golembewski has been a practitioner of scanography.

More recently, Jay Mark Johnson has used slit cameras for artistic effect. Adam Magyar used a custom "slit scan" camera to record city traffic over time in his panoramic photo series Urban Flow (2006–2009). In his next project, Stainless (2010–2011), Magyar made use of an industrial line scan camera and custom software to capture panoramic photos of moving subway traffic in major metropolitan cities, including New York, Paris and Tokyo. He later included high speed video from the perspective of the moving subway car, which captured exceptional three-dimensional detail of people waiting on the platform over a very small amount of time.

The Processing graphics application has an example script for video manipulation that outputs an endlessly rewriting strip photograph.

== Video ==
In cinematography, strip photography can be used manually as a special effect, assembling a video sequence strip-by-strip, particularly in science-fiction movies of the 1960s through 1980s – see slit-scan photography.

Alternatively, a digital video can be sourced to produce either a single strip photograph or an entire video; with the advent of consumer video editing, some amateurs have created such videos, from circa 2008. For clarity assume that the strips are vertical, so they are lined up horizontally; this is commonly done in actual strip photography, due to the frequency of left-right motion in the real world. In the latter case, this corresponds to considering the video as a three-dimensional array and transposing one spatial variable with the temporal variable, transforming $(x,y,t)$ to $(t,y,x).$ Assuming x starts at 0 on the left, as usual, this corresponds to time increasing from left to right; using the opposite convention of time increasing right to left corresponds to adding a reflection, so $(x,y,t)$ to $(t_\text{max}-t,y,x),$ which can also be interpreted as rotation in the $(x,t)$ plane (followed by a translation).

The output video switches width and number of frames from the input – number of frames in the output is the width of the input, while width of the output is number of frames in the input. For a given resolution, the resulting output video has a fixed height and number of frames, and variable width (depending on the duration of the input video). The duration of the output video is determined by the width (x-resolution) of the input frame, which form the frames of the output video, and the frame rate (fps) of the output video, which need not be related to the frame rate of the input video. For example, 1920 × 1080 input images (as in 1080p) output at 24 fps yield 1920/24 = 80 seconds, while at 60 fps yields 1920/60 = 32 seconds. The width of the output video is exactly the number of frames in the input video, hence the frame rate times the duration. A single frame input video (a photo) thus yields a single line of output video, while a very long input video yields a very wide output video, though in both cases they last the same time (assuming the same output frame rate).

As with static strip photography, videos can be produced both in "tableau" format (conventional almost square aspect ratio), or in "strip" format (very wide), and in fact can have exactly the same dimensions as the input video if input frames = input x-resolution (so the $(x,y,t)$ array is square in the $(x,t)$ dimensions); in this case if input and output frame rate are the same, then the input and output videos will have the same duration as well.

Videos in the wide "strip" format can be arbitrarily wide, possibly too wide to fit on a given display. One way to view them is by panning the image horizontally (display only part of the image, panning the frame sideways) while looping through the video. Geometrically this corresponds to replicating the output $(t,y,x)$ array in the third variable, then cutting diagonally. If the frame advances 1 pixel at a time and the output resolution and frame rate are the same as the input, then the entire strip video will be seen and (with technical assumptions on start and end) the output video will be the same resolution and duration as the input. Rather than looping, which introduces a jump, the video can bounce back and forth between endpoints.

Many distortion effects can be more clearly understood in video, such as effects of speed and distance, notably parallax. Further, in addition to lengths in the output being inverse to speed in the input, speed in the output is inverse to speed in the input. In the extreme, a stationary point in one strip in the input becomes a stripe across a single frame in the output, approximating crossing the frame at infinite speed. Further, mirrors in the input function as mirrors in the output, and due to parallax (reflections are further away), reflections move faster than the images they are reflecting.

== History ==
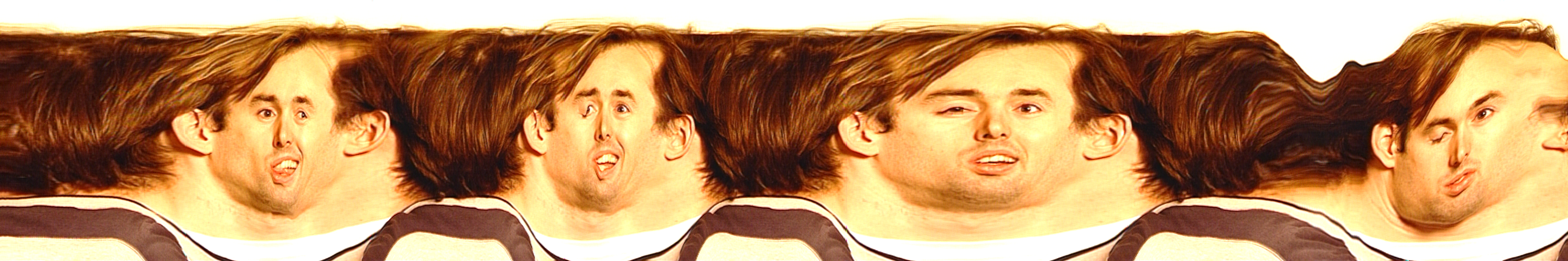
Peripheral photography of a head, with changing expression

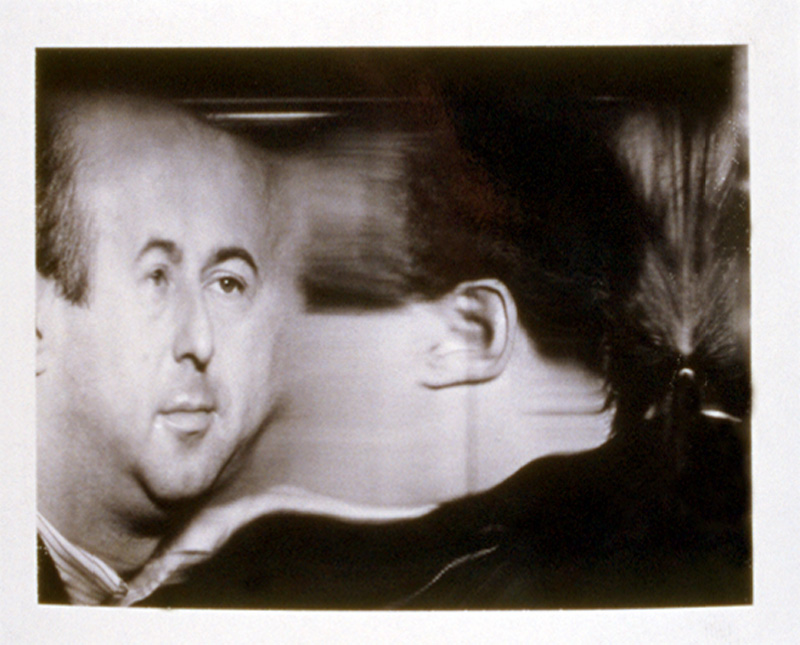
Peripheral Portrait photography by Andrew Davidhazy of Sergio Valle Duarte

Strip photography dates to early panoramic cameras in the 19th century, from 1843. It was initially used for technical and scientific purposes, with Italian scientist Ignazio Porro developing a strip-based camera for mapping in 1853; a similar device was developed by the French inventor Charles Chevallier in the same year. Peripheral photography was pioneered by the British Museum for photographs of Greek vases in the late 19th century. The development of aviation allowed strip aerial photography to replace previous land-based, which was notably used during the Palestine campaign (1915–18). Photo finish cameras were used from 1937 onward, and strip photography was used in synchroballistic photography for ballistics research. Artistic uses have occurred since the 1960s, with the pioneering work of George Silk, and markedly increased since the 1980s, though irregularly, with practitioners often rediscovering the technique independently and being unaware of the history. The articles of Andrew Davidhazy from the 1970s have provided both a scientific background and technical guide for constructing strip cameras and engaging in strip photography.

== Example ==
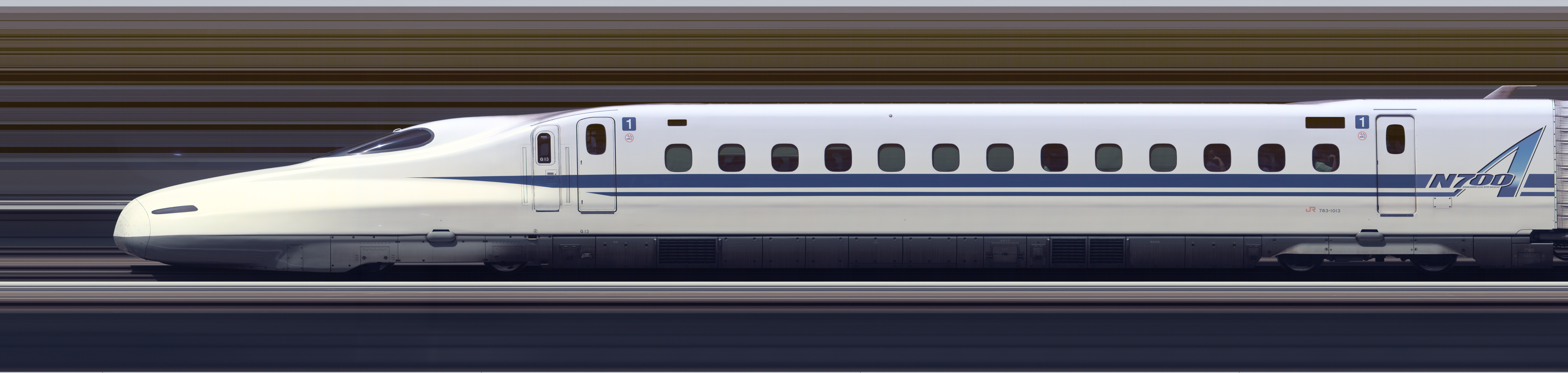
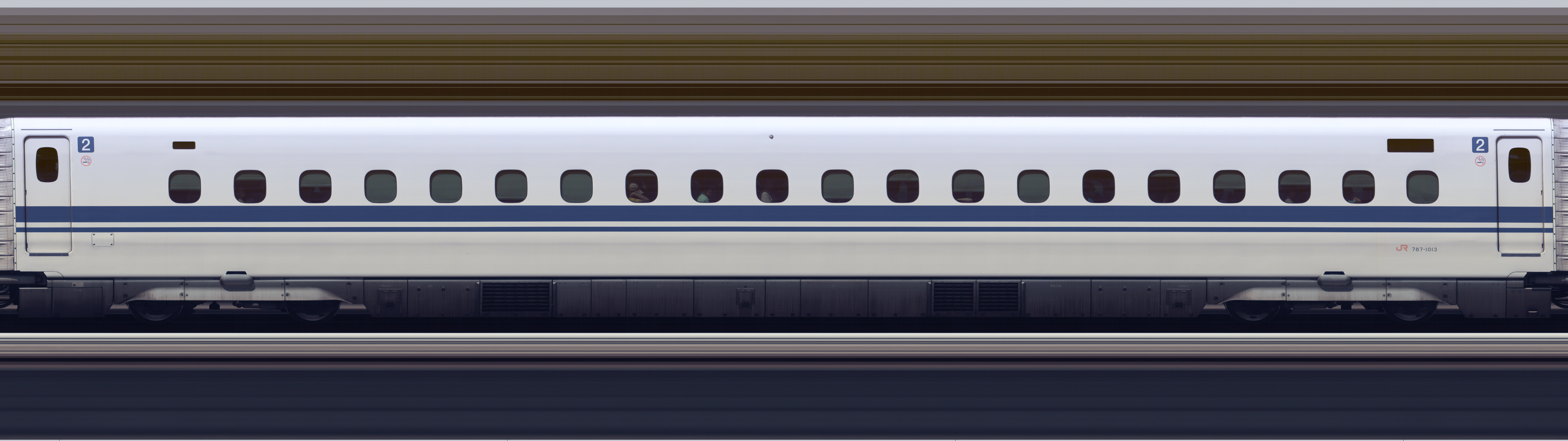
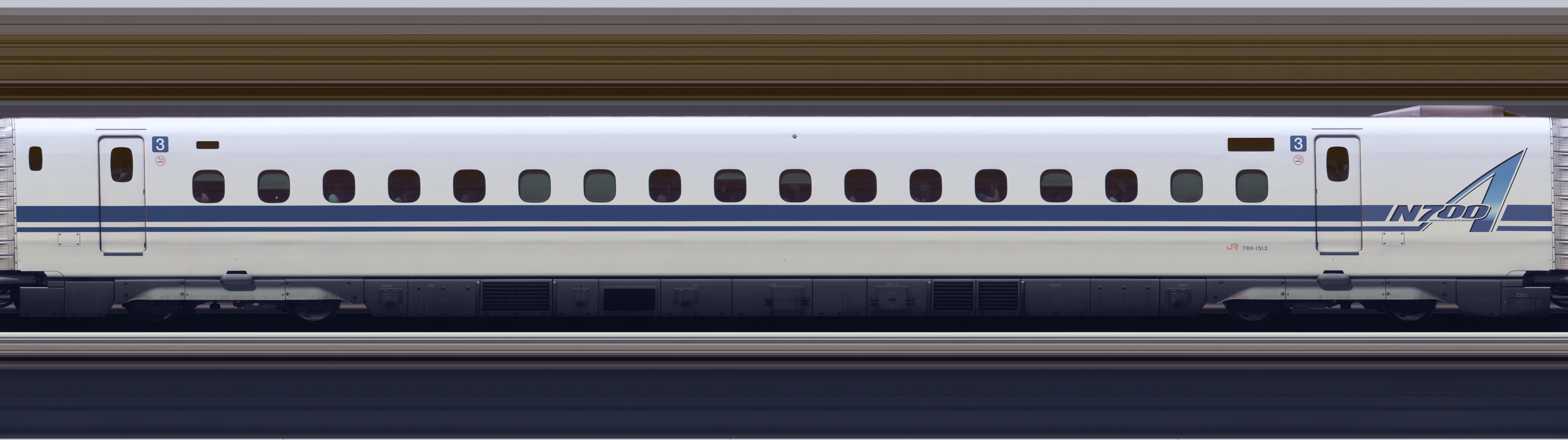
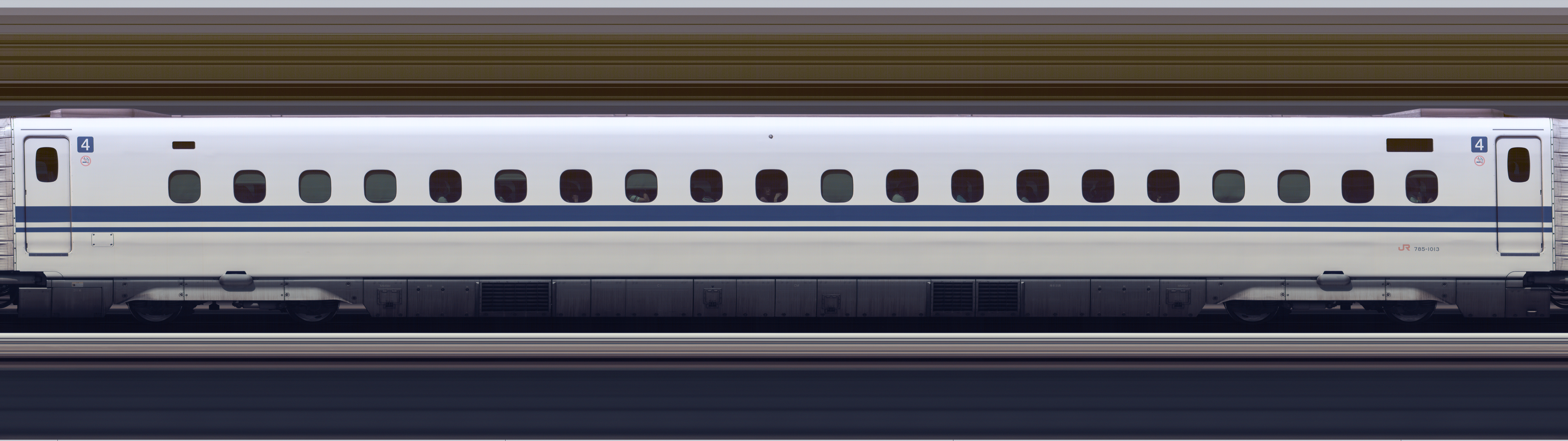
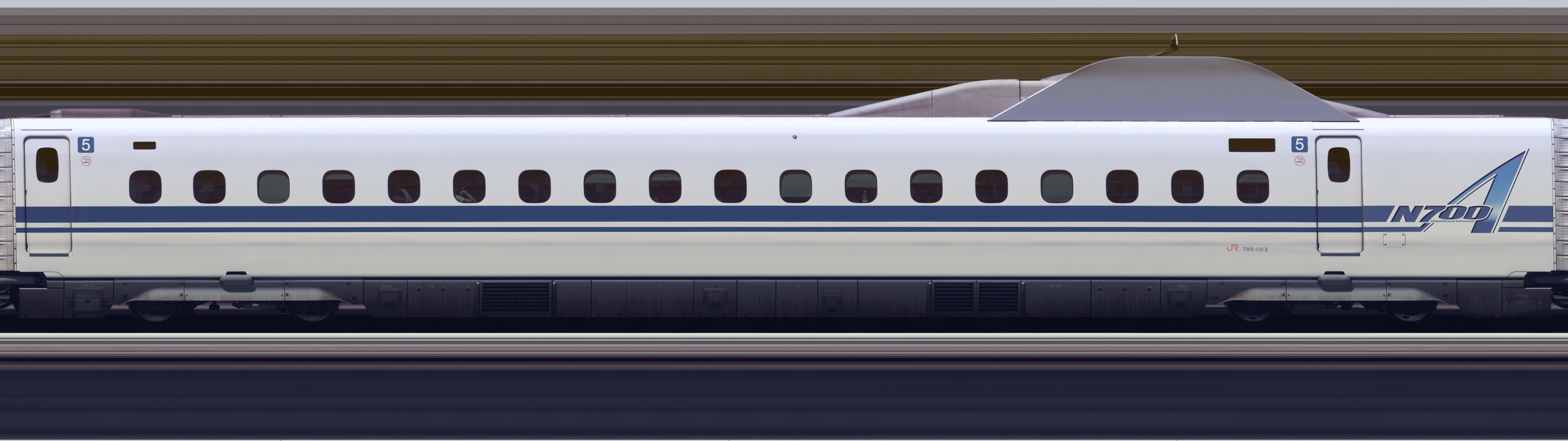
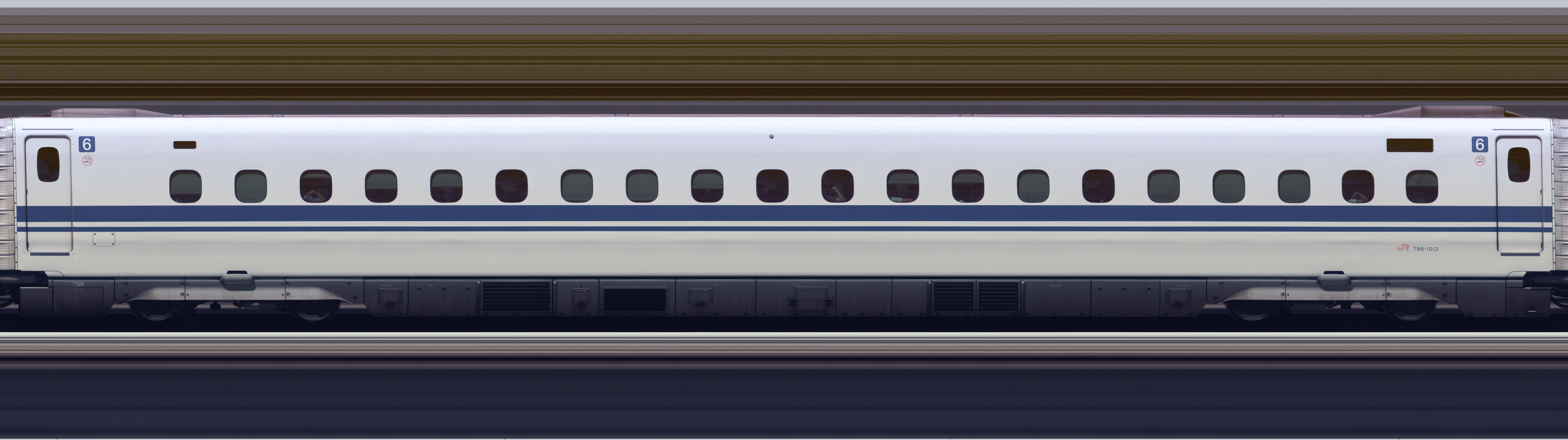
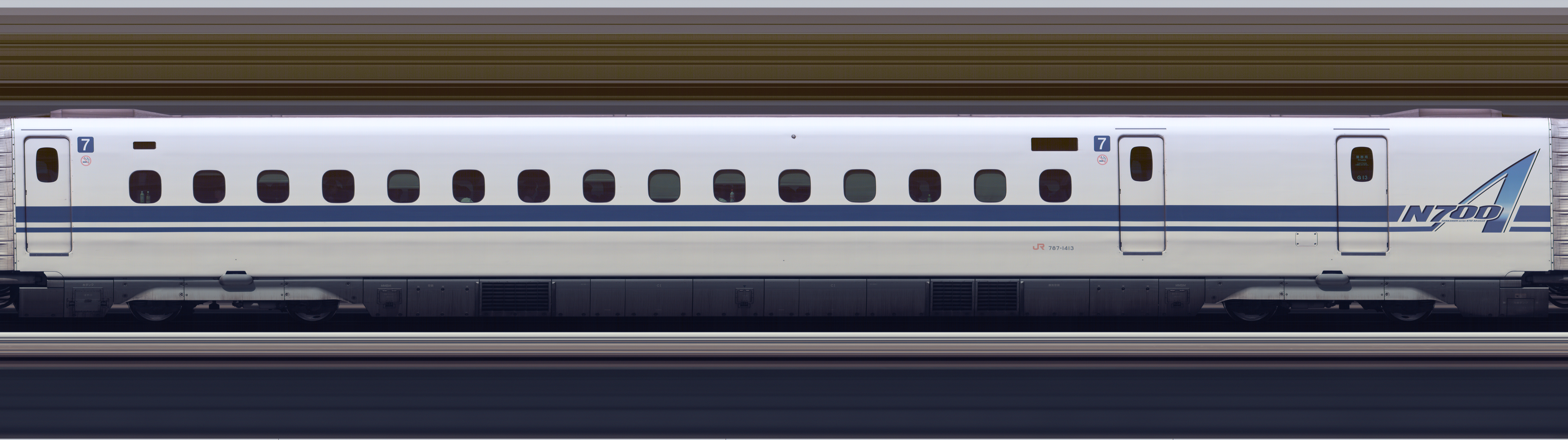
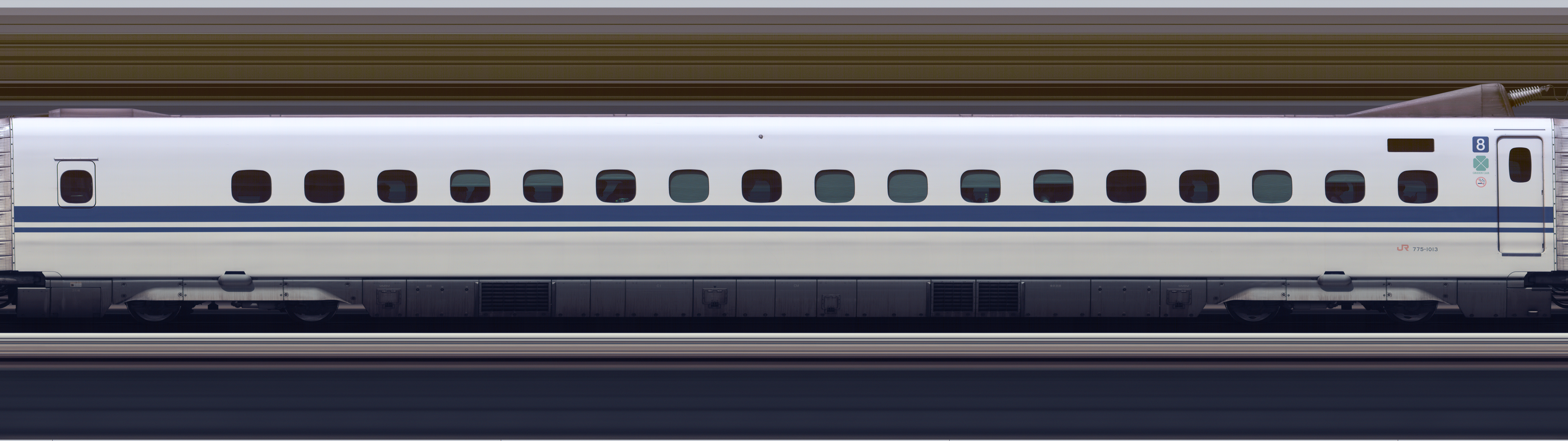
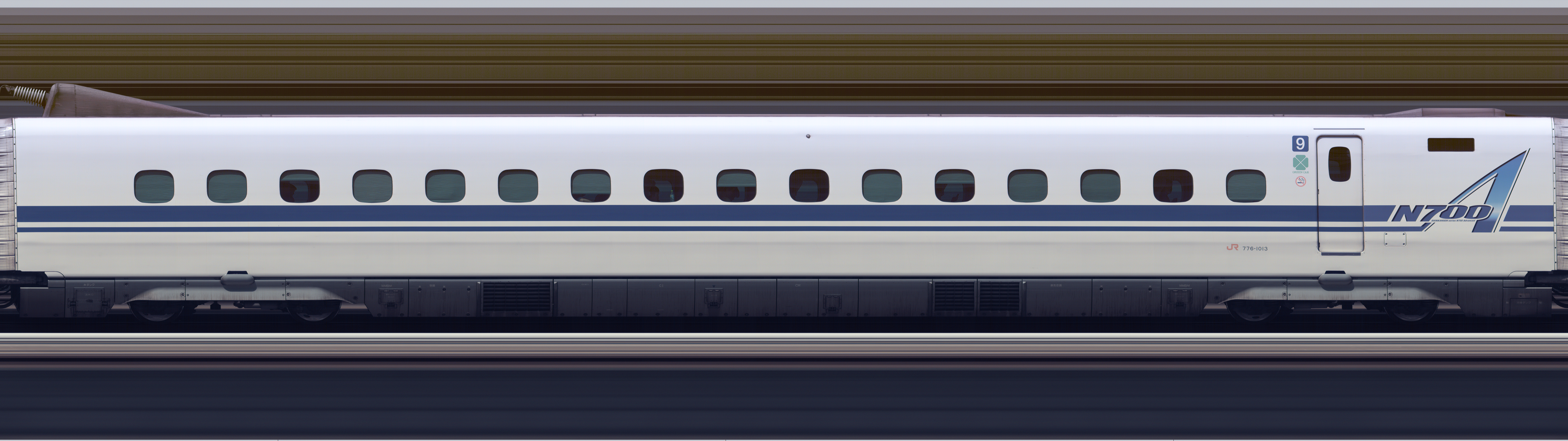
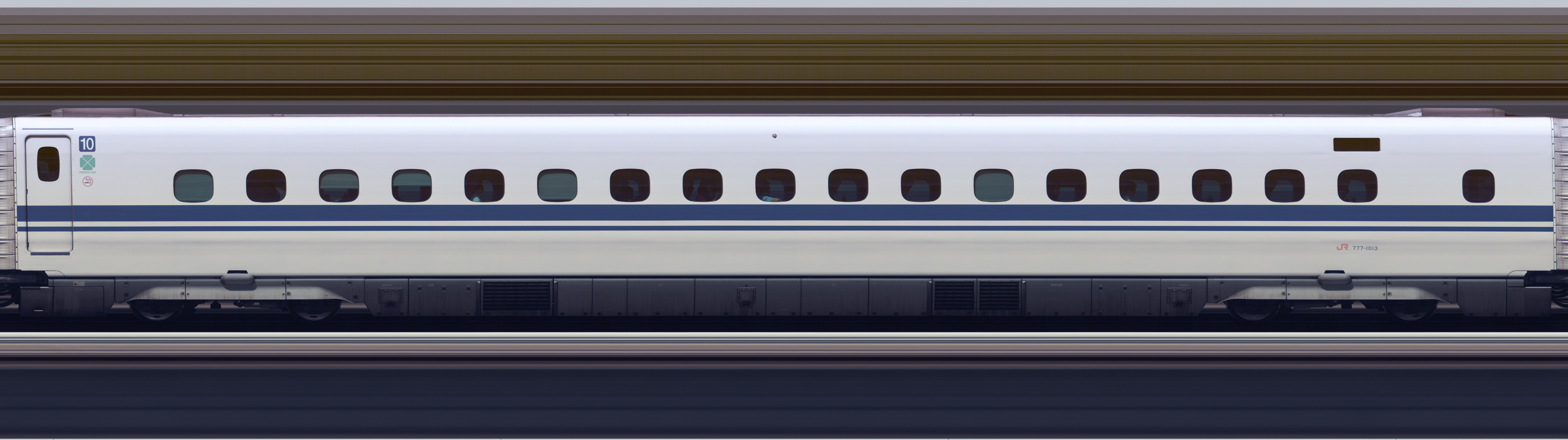
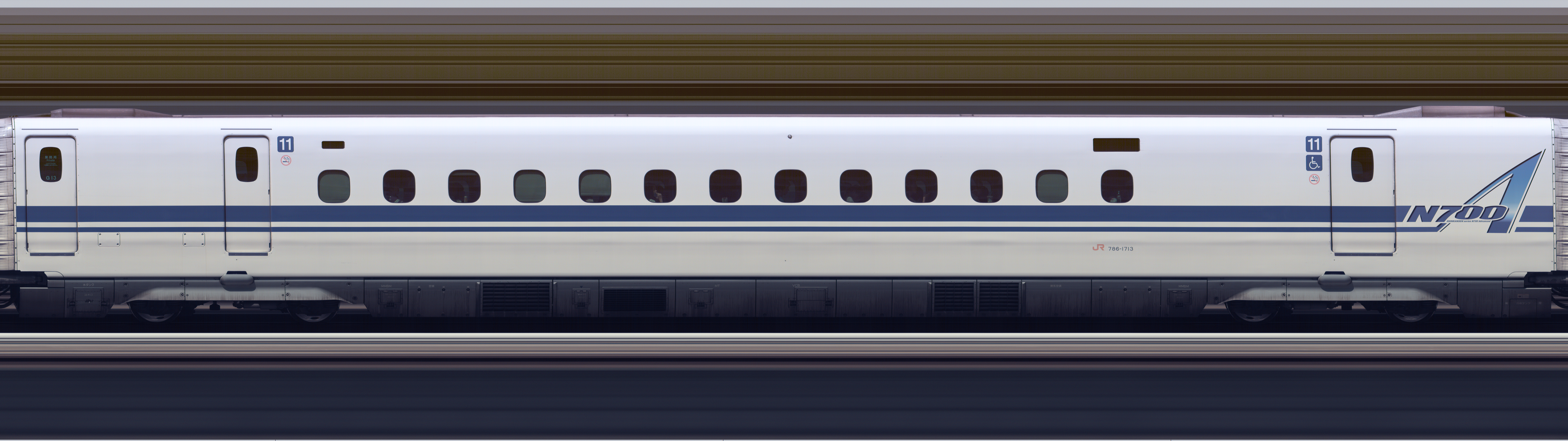
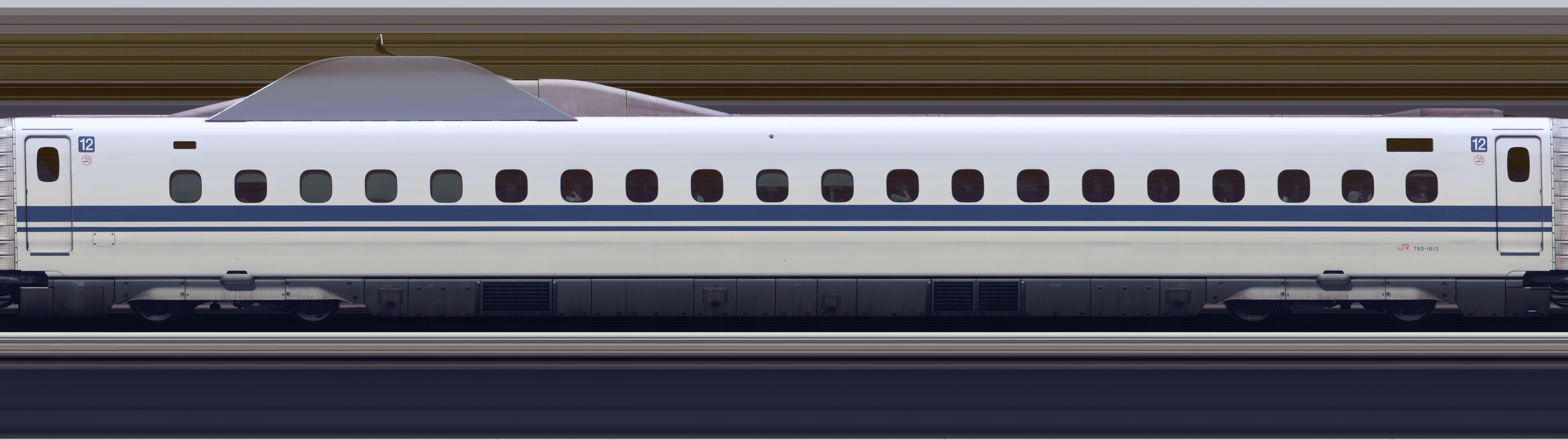
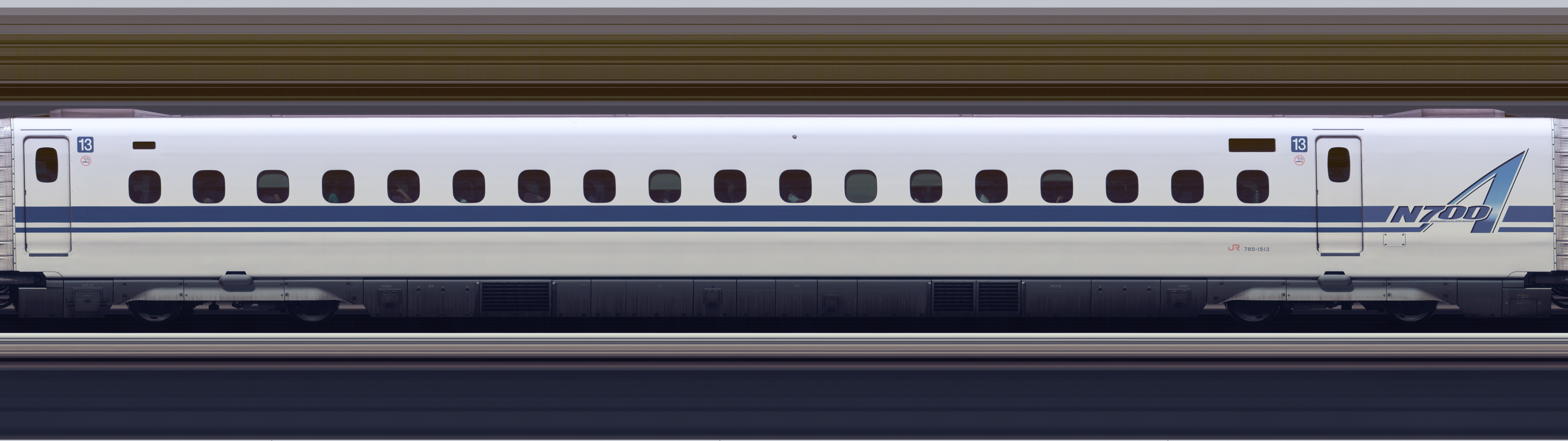
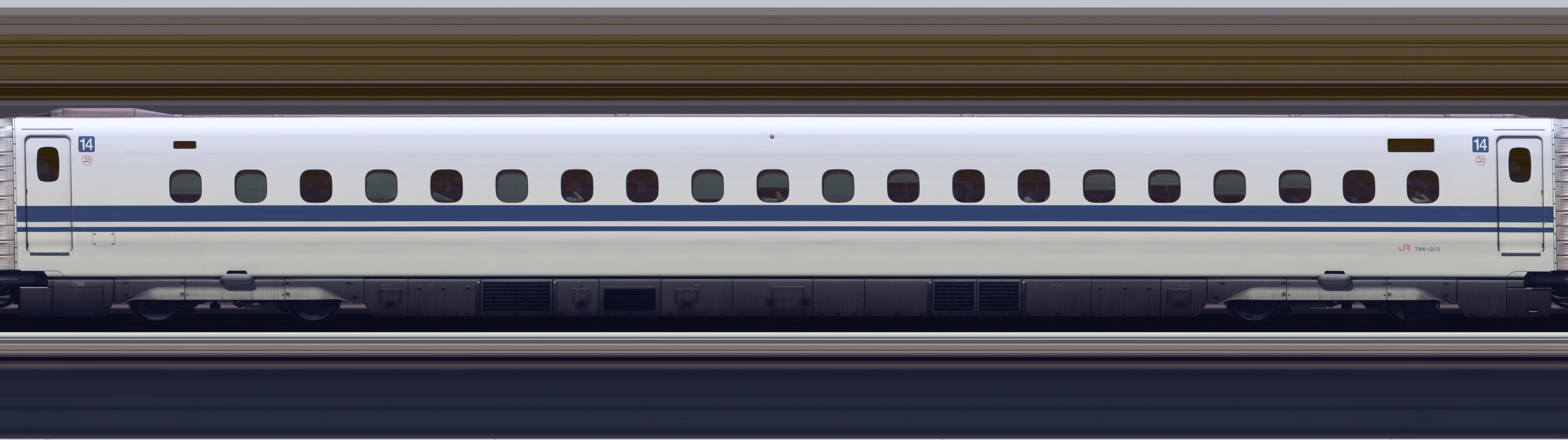
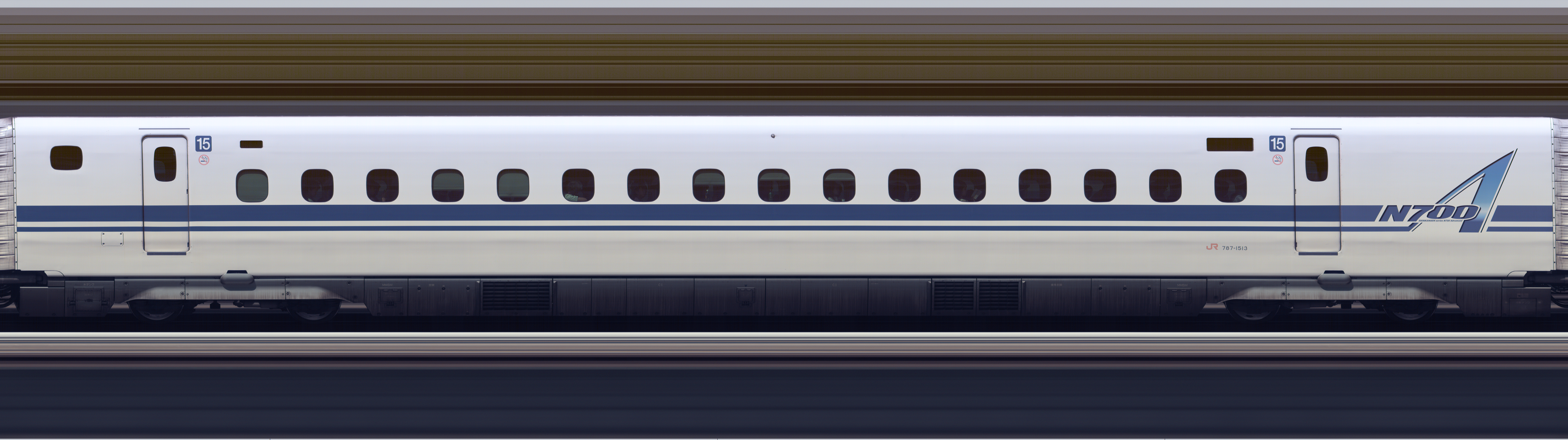
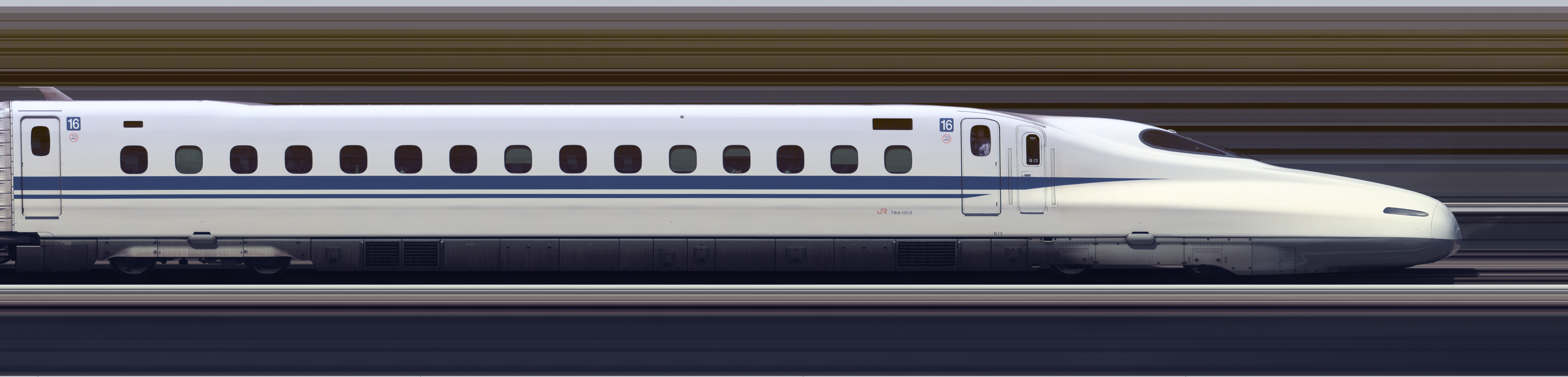

N700 series Shinkansen pictured with this technique.
