= Slit-scan photography =

Photographic and cinematographic process

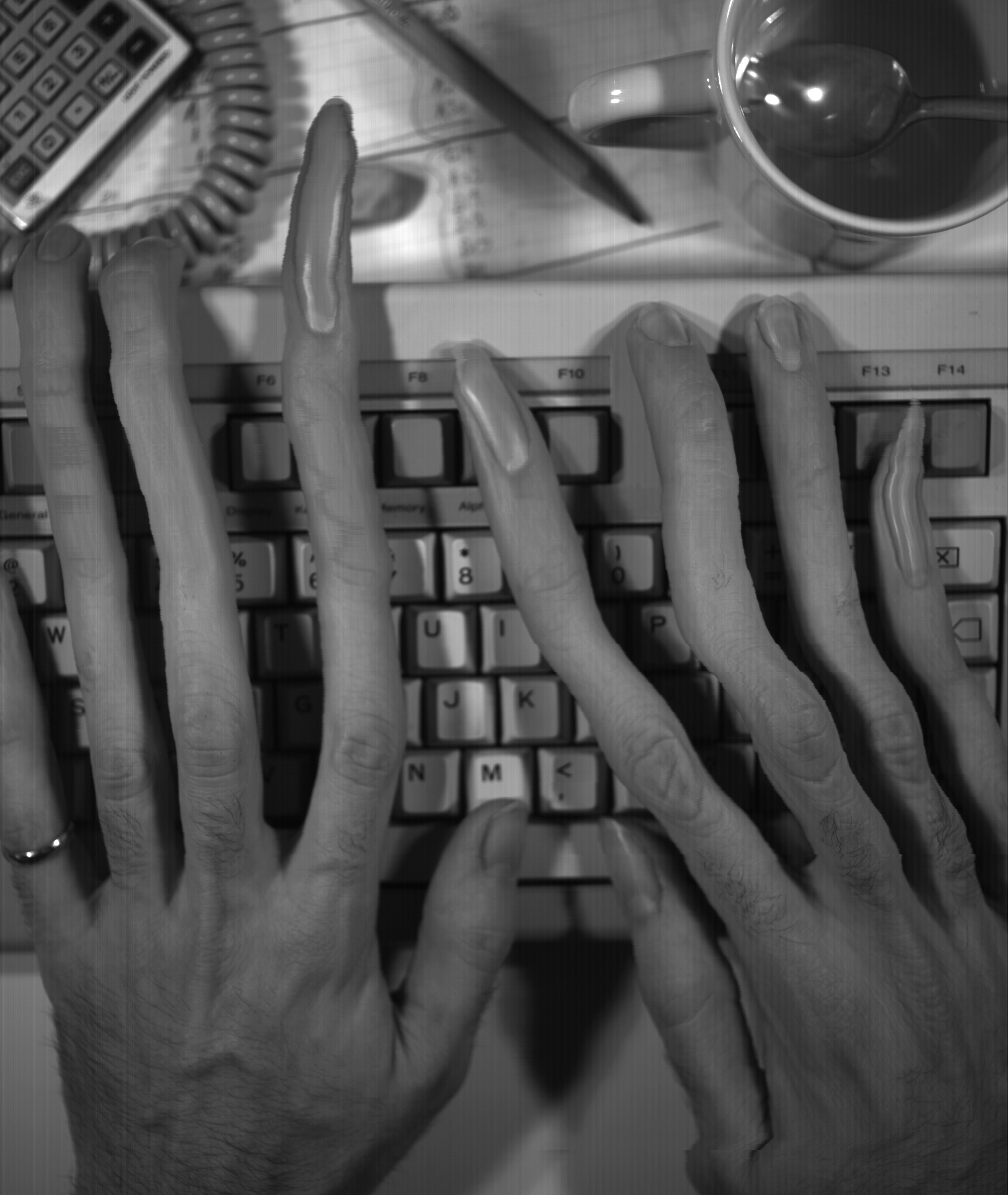
Example of a slit-scan photograph, of hands typing on computer keyboard. The slit scan runs top-to-bottom.

The slit-scan photography technique is a photographic and cinematographic process where a movable slide, into which a slit has been cut, is inserted between the camera and the subject to be photographed.

More generally, "slit-scan photography" refers to cameras that use a slit, which is particularly used in scanning cameras in panoramic photography. This has numerous applications. This article discusses the manual artistic technique.

== Use in cinematography ==
Originally used in static photography to achieve blurriness or deformity, the slit-scan technique was perfected for the creation of spectacular animations. It enables the cinematographer to create a psychedelic flow of colors. Though this type of effect is now often created through computer animation, slit-scan is a mechanical technique.

John Whitney developed it for the opening credits of the Alfred Hitchcock film Vertigo. After he sent some test sequences on film to Stanley Kubrick, the technique was adapted by Douglas Trumbull for 2001: A Space Odyssey in 1968 for the "star gate" sequence, which required a custom-built machine.

This type of effect was used in other films and television productions. Slit-scan was used by Bernard Lodge to create the Doctor Who title sequences for Jon Pertwee and Tom Baker used between December 1973 and January 1980. Slit-scan was also used in Star Trek: The Next Generation (1987–1994) to create the "stretching" of the starship Enterprise-D when it engaged warp drive. Due to the expense and difficulty of this technique, the same three warp-entry shots, all created by Industrial Light and Magic for the series pilot, were reused throughout the series virtually every time the ship went into warp. The 1978 Superman film used slit-scan for its opening title sequence. Slit-scan photography was also used on Interstellar for scenes in the tesseract at the end of the movie.

== Description ==
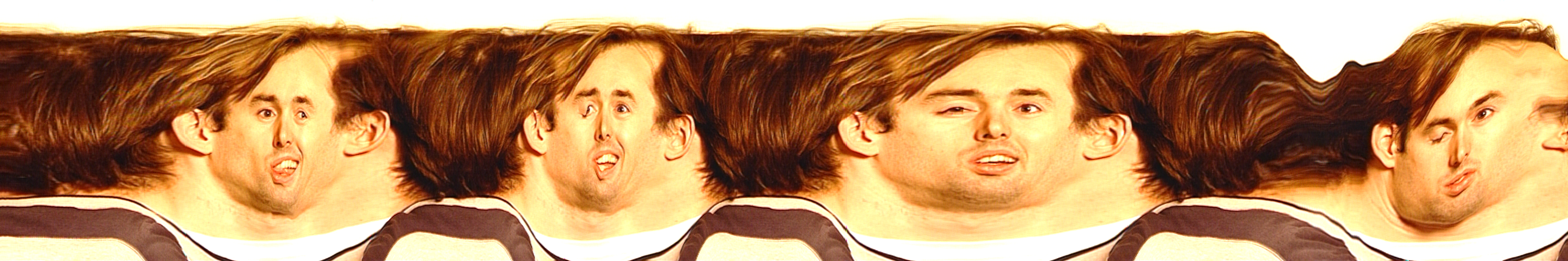
Slit-scan of a person's head rotating

Slit-scan is an animation created image by image. Its principle is based upon the camera’s relative movement in relation to a light source, combined with a long exposure time. The process is as follows:

1. An abstract colored design is painted on a transparent support
2. This support is set down on the glass of a backlighting table and covered with an opaque masking into which one or more slits have been carved.
3. The camera (placed high on top of a vertical ramp and decentered in relation to the light slits) takes a single photograph while moving down the ramp. The result: at the top of the ramp, when it is far away, the camera takes a rather precise picture of the light slit. This image gets progressively bigger and eventually shifts itself out of the frame. This produces a light trail, which meets up with the edge of the screen.
4. These steps are repeated for each image, lightly peeling back the masking, which at the same time produces variation in colors as well as variation of the position of the light stream, thus creating the animation.

Naturally, this effect is very time-consuming, and thus expensive, to create. A 10-second sequence at 24 frames per second requires a minimum of 240 adjustments.
