= Kathleen Unger =

American attorney

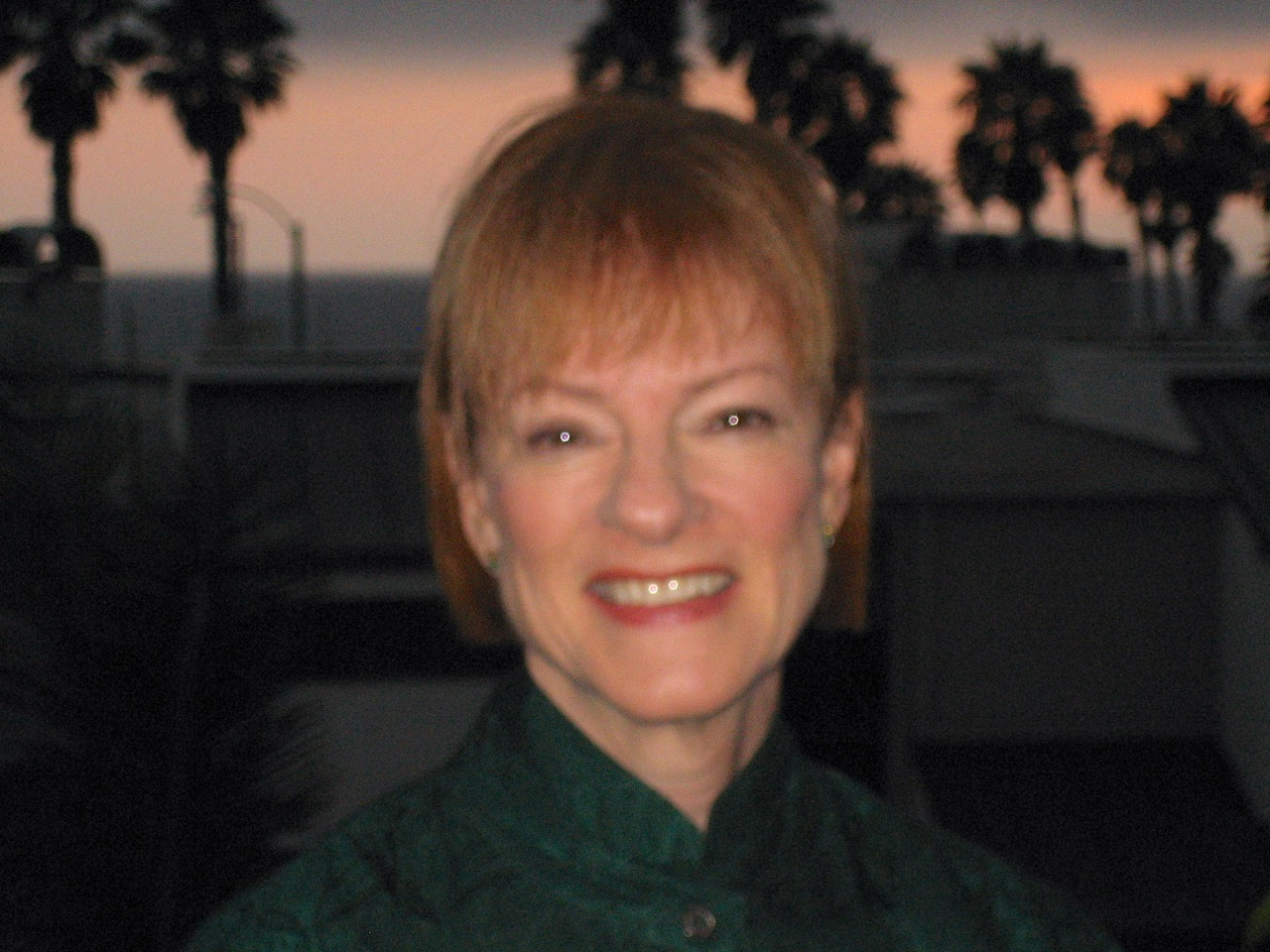
- Unger c. 2017
- Born: Los Angeles, California
- Education: Boston University, B.S.; San Fernando Valley College of Law, J.D.; UCLA, MBA; Harvard Law School, Mediation Certificate
- Occupations: Philanthropist, community leader
- Spouse: Stephen A. Unger
- Website: voteriders.org

Kathleen Unger is an American attorney who serves as the founder, past president and chair of VoteRiders, a nonprofit organization specializing in voter education and assistance in obtaining voter identification. Ms. magazine described her as "one of the leading experts and legal minds when it comes to election protection".

From 2010 to 2023, Unger was of counsel to the law firm of Freeman Freeman & Smiley LLP. Unger served as president (for two years) and board member (for ten years) of the Scott Newman Foundation and Center alongside its chairman, Paul Newman. She was also CEO of the Starbright Foundation, chaired by Steven Spielberg.

== Background ==
Unger was born in Los Angeles and graduated from Beverly Hills High School. She received her Bachelor of Science degree from Boston University and her JD from the San Fernando Valley College of Law where she was named to Law Review and graduated second in her class. Unger received her MBA from the UCLA Anderson School of Management. She is also certified as a Mediator by the Harvard Negotiation Insight Initiative at Harvard Law School.

Unger is part of a family with deep ties in the entertainment industry. She is married to entertainment industry executive recruiter Stephen A. Unger, is the daughter-in-law of film producer Oliver A. Unger, is the sister-in-law of film producer Anthony B. Unger and is the aunt of talent manager and producer David A. Unger.

== Professional career ==
Unger began her career as in-house counsel at MCA/Universal Studios (now NBCUniversal) and remained there for 15 years, rising to vice president, MCA Services Corporation. Unger then became CEO of the Starbright Foundation, working with Steven Spielberg, chairman, to improve the quality of life for children with serious medical conditions by providing entertainment, education and family activities.

After Starbright, Unger was the Publisher and Editor-in-Chief of Talking Heads, the quarterly publication of the Worldwide Entertainment and Communications practice of Spencer Stuart, one of the three largest executive search firms in the world. Subsequently, Unger was the Senior Strategist for Independent World Television. She also provided editorial services to endocrinologist and menopause expert Diana Schwarzbein for both The Schwarzbein Principle II and her subsequent book.

=== Accolades ===
She was selected for inclusion in the 2016, 2017, 2018, 2019, 2020, 2021, 2022, 2023 and 2024 editions of The Best Lawyers in America.

== Election integrity ==
From October 2002 to the present, Unger has devoted herself to matters of election integrity. In the latter part of 2007 she developed and ran the website Election Preparedness, of which she was co-founder and editor, as well as a producer.

In April 2012, Unger founded and served as the President and Chairman of the Board of VoteRiders. Dedicated to ensuring that eligible Americans can vote, VoteRiders educates voters and assists citizens to secure their voter ID, including by supporting organizations, volunteers, and communities to sustain such voter ID education and assistance efforts. On September 21, 2013, VoteRiders hosted its first Voter ID Clinic in Houston. VoteRiders was also active in the 2017 Senate special election in Alabama.

In response to the COVID-19 pandemic in the US, Unger highlighted disruptions to the 2020 US presidential election and the issue of acquiring Real IDs in the face of travel restrictions.

In August 2020, Unger expressed concern about voter participation in the upcoming election, noting that multiple lawsuits aimed at restricting voting options and baseless claims of widespread fraud via mail-in ballots can confuse voters and depress turnout: "Whether that's anybody's intention or not, that is absolutely an unequivocal result."

Unger has been quoted in the media on non-profit organizations and in connection with voter rights issues. She has spoken at Stanford University, Pepperdine University and Occidental College. She has also participated as an expert/panelist at such events as the Carter Center Baker Institute webinar on Voter Registration and Voter ID and Voter Mobilization Working Group at Columbia World Projects, Columbia University.

An extensive interview in the January 6, 2021 issue of Ms. magazine highlighted Unger's efforts in ensuring that voters eligible to participate in the 2020 presidential election, as well as the subsequent crucial Georgia Senate runoffs in January 2021, would not be denied their right to vote.

== Political and non-profit ==
Unger co-chaired Rep. Edward Markey's successful 1984 Congressional campaign; served as Director, Business for California's 1988 Presidential Campaign; and was appointed a National Finance Vice Chair and a Trustee for John Kerry's 2004 Presidential campaign. In 2013, Unger served as California Co-chair for Massachusetts Congressman Markey's successful campaign for the United States Senate.

Unger has served on the boards of the Santa Monica-based KCRW and the Valley Community Clinic of North Hollywood, CA, including as Vice Chairman. Since 1994, she has served on the Board of Directors (and is now emeritus) of the Eagles Charitable Foundation, formerly known as Eagles Youth Partnership, the foundation of the Philadelphia Eagles football franchise.
