= Tam Lin (film) =

1970 British horror film by Roddy McDowall

Tam Lin or The Devil's Widow
- Film poster
- Directed by: Roddy McDowall
- Written by: William Spier; Robert Burns (poem)
- Produced by: Alan Ladd Jr. Stanley Mann; Anthony B. Unger; Henry T. Weinstein
- Starring: Ava Gardner; Ian McShane; Richard Wattis; Cyril Cusack; Stephanie Beacham
- Cinematography: Billy Williams
- Edited by: John Victor-Smith
- Music by: Stanley Myers
- Production companies: Gershwin-Kastner Productions; Winkast Film Productions
- Distributed by: American International Pictures
- Release date: December 1970 (UK)
- Running time: 106 minutes
- Country: United Kingdom
- Language: English

Tam Lin, also known as The Ballad of Tam Lin and The Devil's Widow, is a 1970 British folk horror film directed by Roddy McDowall and starring Ava Gardner and Ian McShane.

== Plot ==
A mysterious older woman, Mickey, is in love with a younger man, Tom. She has used her wealth and influence to collect a group of hangers-on and is very controlling of Tom, but he meets and falls in love with Janet, the innocent young daughter of a vicar, and gets her pregnant. When Tom tries to leave, Mickey puts into motion a nefarious plot to enact a deadly vengeance.

== Cast ==
- Ava Gardner as Michaela (Mickey) Cazaret
- Ian McShane as Tom Lynn
- Richard Wattis as Elroy
- Cyril Cusack as Vicar Julian Ainsley
- Stephanie Beacham as Janet Ainsley
- Virginia Tingwell as Lottie
- Fabia Drake as Miss Gibson
- Salena Jones as Nightclub singer

First Coven

- Madeline Smith as Sue
- Sinéad Cusack as Rose
- Jenny Hanley as Caroline
- Joanna Lumley as Georgia
- Victoria Fairbrother as Vanna (listed in credits as Victoria Farbrother)
- Rosemary Blake as Kate
- David Whitman (Kiffer Weisselberg) as Oliver
- Bruce Robinson as Alan
- Michael Bills as Michael
- Peter Hinwood as Guy
- Hayward Morse as Andy
- Julian Barnes as Terry
- Norman Oliver as Peter (listed in credits as Oliver Norman)

Second Coven

- Jan Dinnen as Second Coven member
- Delia Lindsay as Second Coven member
- Linda Marlowe as Second Coven member
- Yvonne Quenet as Second Coven member
- Erika Raffael as Second Coven member
- Jocelyne Sbath as Second Coven member
- Andrew Grant as Second Coven member
- Don Hawkins as Second Coven member
- Michael Mundell as Second Coven member
- Christopher Williams as Second Coven member
- Jimmy Winston as Second Coven member

== Production ==
The film was made by Commonwealth United Entertainment. It was produced by Alan Ladd, Jr., and Stanley Mann, from a screenplay by William Spier based on the traditional Scottish poem The Ballad of Tam Lin. The film had original music by Stanley Myers and a musical version of the original poem recorded by British folk rock band Pentangle; it was photographed by Billy Williams. It was the only film directed by McDowall.

Filming took place over twelve weeks in the summer of 1969 at Traquair House and other locations in Peeblesshire, Scotland, as well at Edinburgh and Queensferry with the Forth Bridge (the scene at the caravan park by the bridges). The cast stayed at the Peebles Hydro Hotel. Interiors were shot at Pinewood Studios, on sets designed by art directors John Graysmark and Donald M. Ashton. Costumes were designed by Beatrice Dawson and Ava Gardner's gowns were executed by Balmain. The film had the working titles Games and Toys, Toys and Games and Toys. The dubbing editor was Don Challis.

Billy Williams recalled the challenges of photographing Gardner outside the studio and shot the climax LSD-like sequences on infrared film. He recounted how Commonwealth United Entertainment went bankrupt during the editing. The film was shelved until Commonwealth United Entertainment's films were acquired by National Telefilm Associates and American International Pictures in the USA.

== Release ==
The film was submitted to the British Board of Film Classification (BBFC) in March 1970 under the title Tam Lin, and received an 'X' classification (suitable for people aged 18 or over) after one cut. It had a running time of 104m 1s. A few months later, on 1 July 1970, the BBFC introduced the 'AA' classification (suitable for people aged 14 or over); Tam Lin was then re-submitted under the title The Ballad of Tam Lin and received a 'AA' certificate. It was given a limited release in Britain in December 1970. Various versions of the film have the copyright dates of 1970 and 1971.

In 1972 the rights were acquired by the American film distribution companies National Telefilm Associates and American International Pictures. Following recuts by these companies it was submitted to the BBFC for a third time in 1977 under the title The Devil's Widow, and it is this version which finally received a full release in the UK and in the US.

In 1998, "Martin Scorsese, ... impressed by the film after watching McDowall’s personal print .... set about locating rights and unearthing film elements in order to restore the picture and bring it back into circulation on VHS in the US." This newer release of the film (Republic Pictures Home Video) had been recut with McDowall's supervision and input, to bring it closer to his original intention, and he contributed to the commentary on the VHS. McDowall died that same year.

In 2022 McDowall's recut of Tam Lin was released on Blu-ray, with special features including a "meticulously researched" audio commentary by BFI Flipside co-founders William Fowler and Vic Pratt; interviews with Ian McShane, Stephanie Beacham and Jacqui McShee, the lead singer of Pentangle; "Ballad of a B-Movie: Revisiting Tam Lin", a 2021 interview with film historian David Del Valle; and "Red Red? Red", a 1971 short film (34 minutes) about hippies living in a commune in Devon. The first pressing only of the Blu-ray came with an illustrated booklet.

== Critical reception ==
The Monthly Film Bulletin wrote:

The beginning is not promising: tricksy angles, glossy decor and photography, smart-set drug junketings that echo the last days of Swinging London. What develops is perhaps even less palatable as the young lovers meet on the Scottish moors in the glowing soft focus terms of a TV commercial, romping about with the progress of their love recorded in a series of freeze frames. From there on, however, with the dialogue beginning to take on an edge of brilliance, Roddy McDowall gets a much firmer grip on the film, building a broodingly enigmatic sense of menace out of stray allusions and apparitions that hover without ever really being explained or over-exploited ... When it finally does come, the climax tends to be a little too excited for its own good; but it has some excellent notions ... and an ending not unworthy of The Hounds of Zaroff [1932] with lan McShane being pursued through a misty forest by a pack of hell-hounds conjured by his own imagination. Something of a curate's egg, in other words, but a horror film very definitely to be seen.

The Radio Times Guide to Film rated Tam Lin two stars out of five, writing: "although interminably slow and hilariously pretentious at times, its aura of faded Swinging Sixties decadence is interesting."
