= Anthony Unger =

Anthony Unger may refer to:

- Tony Unger (Anthony Charles Unger, 1938–2014), Rhodesian field hockey Olympian
- Anthony B. Unger (born 1940), American film producer (1973's Don't Look Now)
