= Kelly Flint =

American film actress (1911–2000)

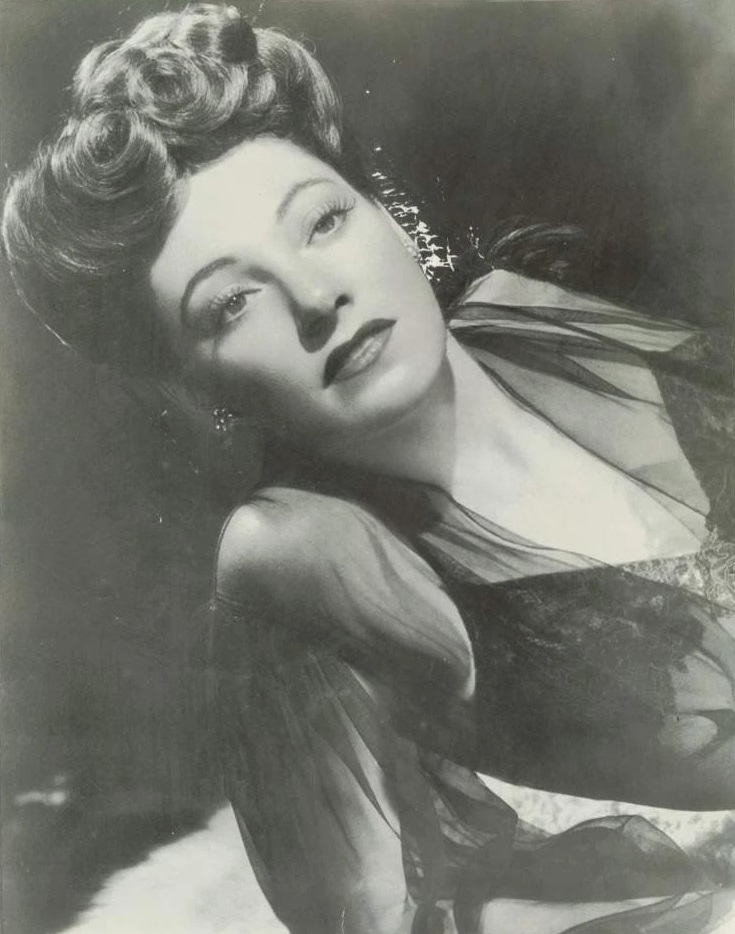
- Born: November 15, 1911
- Died: July 4, 2000 (aged 88)
- Education: University of California, Los Angeles
- Years active: 1943-1947

Kelly Flint (November 15, 1911 – July 4, 2000) was an American actress. She appeared in several films in the 1940s, in addition to plays and radio programs.She later worked as an airline beauty and styling consultant.

== Early years ==
Flint graduated from the Anna Head School for Girls and the University of California, Los Angeles and attended the University of Southern California. Her earliest involvement in entertainment was holding a candle when she appeared in advertising for Kelly Tires.

== Career ==
Flint's work on stage included having the lead role in Yours for Fun at the Music Box Theater (1944). She also was featured in The Play's the Thing at the Old Log Theatre (1949) and in the Barter Theatre's production of Dangerous Corner (1950), which toured Virginia in addition to being presented at the theatre's main site.

Radio programs on which Flint appeared included Hallmark Playhouse and Lux Radio Theatre. She was in the Three Stooges 1944 comedy No Dough Boys. Flint was one of the oldest living female actresses to appear with the comedy trio during their prime years (1934–1945) before her death in 2000.

Flint worked as a Powers model.and was a style and beauty consultant. In 1956 she began working as styling coordinator for American Airlines, "in charge of all styling and grooming" for that company.

== Selected filmography ==
- The Roosevelt Story (1947)
- No Dough Boys (1944)
