= The Desperate Ones =

1967 film

- Directed by: Alexander Ramati
- Written by: Alexander Ramati
- Produced by: Anthony B. Unger
- Starring: Maximilian Schell; Irene Papas; Raf Vallone
- Cinematography: Christian Matras
- Edited by: Peter Weatherley
- Music by: Cristóbal Halffter
- Production companies: David Films; Pro Artis Ibérica
- Distributed by: Commonwealth United Entertainment (US); Ízaro Films (Spain)
- Release date: March 26, 1967
- Running time: 104 minutes
- Countries: Spain; United States
- Language: English

The Desperate Ones or Beyond the Mountains (Spanish: Más allá de las montañas) is a 1967 American-Spanish dramatic adventure film directed by Alexander Ramati and starring Maximilian Schell, Irene Papas and Raf Vallone.

== Plot ==
Following the Nazi-Soviet Pact in 1939 and the subsequent invasion of Poland, two brothers are sent to the gulag in Siberia. They manage to escape and undertake an epic attempt to make it to the border with Afghanistan.

== Cast ==
- Maximilian Schell as Marek
- Irene Papas as Ajmi
- Raf Vallone as Victor
- Theodore Bikel as Kisielev
- Maria Perschy as Marusia
- Fernando Rey as Ibram
- George Voskovec as Doctor
- Alberto de Mendoza as Hamlat
- Antonio Vico as Ulug Beg
- Vicente Sangiovanni as Shura
- Boyd Holister as Ukrainian NKVD
- Danny Steinmann as NKVD Guard
- Mariela Chatlak as Aka
- Carmen Carbonell as Ulug Beg's Wife

== See also ==
- The Way Back (2010)

== Bibliography ==
- Goble, Alan. The Complete Index to Literary Sources in Film. Walter de Gruyter, 1999.
