= Account Rendered (1957 film) =

1957 British crime film by Peter Graham Scott

- Original British quad poster
- Directed by: Peter Graham Scott
- Screenplay by: Barbara S. Harper
- Based on: novel by Pamela Barrington
- Produced by: Francis Edge; Luigi Rovere; John Temple-Smith
- Starring: Griffith Jones; Ursula Howells; Honor Blackman
- Cinematography: Walter J. Harvey
- Edited by: Tom Simpson
- Production company: Major Pictures
- Distributed by: J. Arthur Rank Film Distributors
- Release date: August 1957
- Running time: 59 minutes
- Country: United Kingdom
- Language: English

Account Rendered is a 1957 British second feature ('B') crime film directed by Peter Graham Scott and starring Griffith Jones, Ursula Howells and Honor Blackman. It was written by Barbara S. Harper based on Pamela Barrington's 1953 novel of the same name. It was released by the Rank Organisation.

== Premise ==
When wealthy Lucille Ainsworth is found strangled on Hampstead Heath, Detective Inspector Marshall is put on the case. Lucille's husband Robert suspected her of being unfaithful, and had been following her. But he is just one of many suspects with a motive for murder.

== Cast ==
- Griffith Jones as Robert Ainsworth
- Ursula Howells as Lucille Ainsworth
- Honor Blackman as Sarah Hayward
- Ewen Solon as Detective Inspector Marshall
- Carl Bernard as Gilbert Morgan
- Mary Jones as Nella Langford
- Philip Gilbert as John Langford
- John Van Eyssen as Clive Franklyn
- Robert Raikes as Detective Sergeant Berry
- Gordon Phillott as Rigby
- Doris Yorke as landlady
- Vernon Smythe as Colonel Jarvis
- Gerda Larsen as Blondi
- Harry Ross as Bernard Goodman
- Barry Steele as barman
- Edwin Richfield as porter

== Production ==
The film's sets were designed by Norman G. Arnold.

== Critical reception ==
Kine Weekly wrote: "Its principal characters are not entitled to much sympathy and the dialogue is somewhat stilted, but a twist ending and slightly above average staging tip the scales in its favour. … The picture does not put the smart set or bankers in a favourable light, but has just enough surface action to satisfy the unexacting "ninepennies". Griffith Jones, Ursula Howells, Honor Blackman, Carl Bernard and John Van Eyssen let few opportunities slide in the leading roles, and the same goes for the bit part players. Its interior settings are elegant, and some suspense is worked into the climax."

Picturegoer wrote: "Who pays the piper when a banker's wife goes on the spree? Find out in this knife-edged thriller that notches up another win for the best British "Bs." There's a mint of crisp and crackling clues, neatly stacked to keep you guessing, backed by direction with authority and dash."

The Radio Times Guide to Films gave the film 1/5 stars, writing: "This substandard B-movie is notable only for an early screen appearance by Honor Blackman."

In British Sound Films: The Studio Years 1928–1959 David Quinlan rated the film as "average", writing: "efficient thriller."

Leslie Halliwell said: "Adequate lower-billed suspenser."

Britmovie called it an "efficient B-movie murder mystery based on Pamela Barrington's 1953 pulp novel and directed by the tireless Peter Graham Scott. The plot is fairly straightforward but entertainingly interwoven by screenwriter Barbara S. Harper, and cinematographer Walter J. Harvey brings an air of tension to proceedings. The cast is entirely competent but a young pre-Bond Honor Blackman shines through."
