= The Promise (1969 film) =

1969 film directed by Michael Hayes

- Directed by: Michael Hayes
- Written by: Michael Hayes
- Based on: a play by Aleksei Arbuzov
- Produced by: Anthony B. Unger; Henry T. Weinstein
- Starring: John Castle; Ian McKellen
- Edited by: John Trumper
- Music by: Iwan Williams
- Production companies: Howard & Wyndham Films and Television
- Release date: December 1969
- Running time: 92 minutes
- Country: United Kingdom
- Language: English
- Budget: less than £200,000

The Promise is a 1969 British drama film based on a play by Russian playwright Aleksei Arbuzov. Set in the Soviet Union during the Second World War, it is the story of a love triangle involving three young people caught up in the Siege of Leningrad. The film follows the main protagonists in the post-war years in an attempt to show the lasting effects of that relationship. It featured Ian McKellen's film debut.

The film was on the British Film Institute's BFI 75 Most Wanted list of lost films until a mislabelled copy was found in the British Film Institute's archive after an audit.

== Cast ==
- John Castle as Marat Yestigneyev
- Ian McKellen as Leonidik
- Susan Macready as Lika Vasilyevna
- Mary Jones as Mother
- David Nettheim as Stepfather
- David Garfield as Soldier

== See also ==
- List of lost films
