= David A. Unger =

American film producer

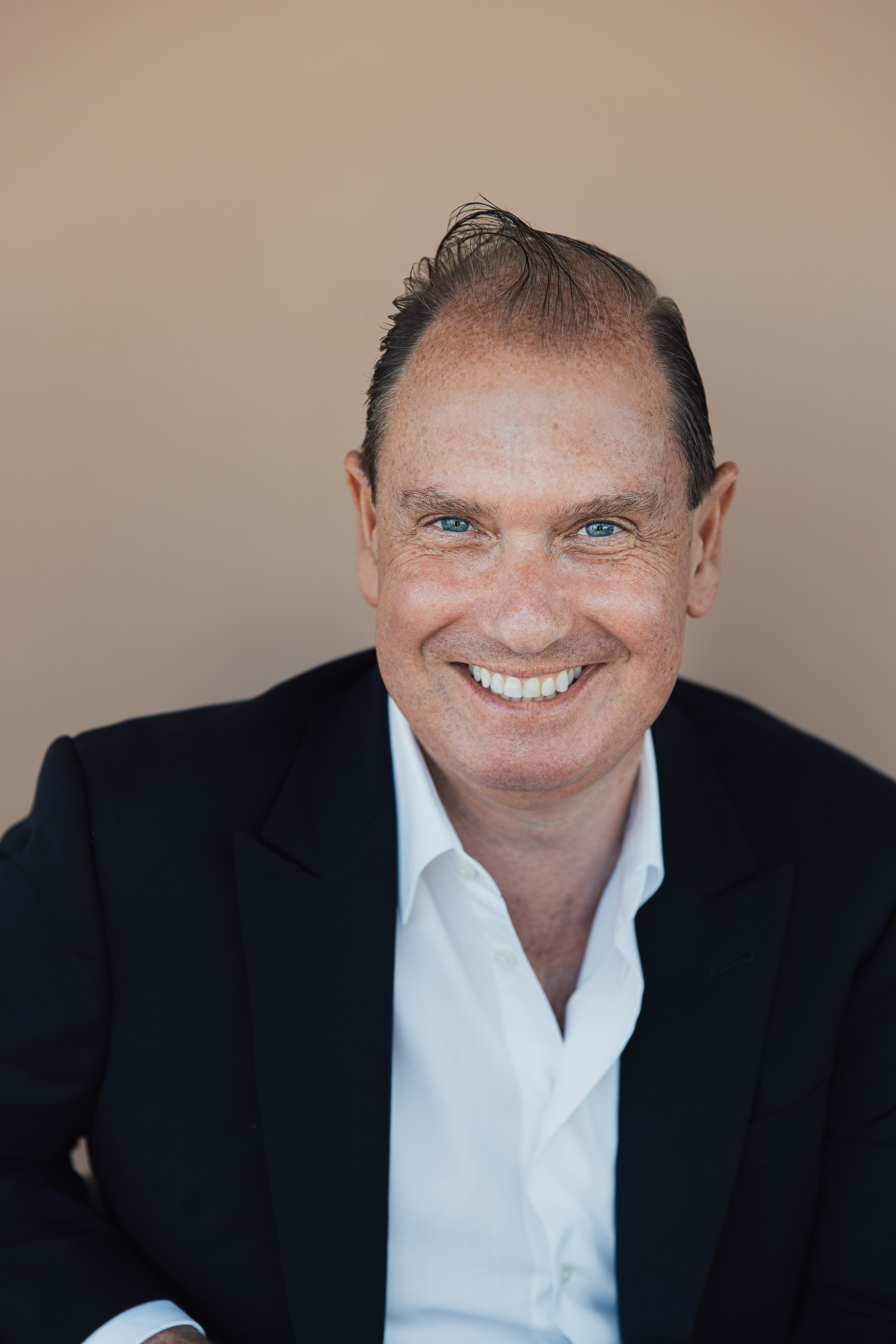
- Born: December 30, 1971 (age 54); London, England
- Occupation: Entertainment executive

David A. Unger (born December 30, 1971) is CEO of Artist International Group, a global talent management, branding and content production company representing clients in the fields of film, television and media advisory. Born in London, Unger has served as a talent and literary agent for over 20 years.

== Background ==
Unger was born in London and raised in London, Madrid, Paris, and Los Angeles. He is a graduate of Boston University. He speaks English, Spanish, Italian, and French; he holds US and European passports.

Unger's father, Anthony B. Unger, produced Don't Look Now, starring Donald Sutherland and Julie Christie. His grandfather, Oliver A. Unger, was a film producer, distributor and exhibitor. His uncle, Stephen A. Unger, is an executive recruiter for the entertainment and media industries.

== Early career ==
At the age of 27 Unger was chosen for The Hollywood Reporter's Annual "Next Gen" special issue. He was recognized by Fade In magazine as one of their "Top 100 People in Hollywood You Need to Know."

Unger was a vice-president and talent agent at International Creative Management for 15 years. At ICM, he represented actors, directors and writers as well as advised the agency's branding and film financing groups. In October 2012, ICM became ICM Partners and in January 2013. Unger became the first ICM agent to join former ICM Chairman Jeff Berg at Berg's newly-founded agency, Resolution. Unger served as talent and literary agent at Resolution and he was a member of Resolution's Media Finance Group for two years.

In February 2015 Unger, as Co-Chief Executive Officer and Partner, formed Three Six Zero Entertainment, a full service management company that represented actors, directors and writers in the film, television, and digital industries. The company offered branding and financial services to clients and operated in partnership with Jay-Z's Roc Nation.

== Film production ==
Unger is known for representing international talent. Unger represented Academy Award winner Michelle Yeoh until 2025. He is credited with resurrecting the career of Mickey Rourke, who thanked Unger in his Best Actor-winning speeches for his role in The Wrestler at the BAFTA Awards and the Golden Globe Awards.

Unger is an executive producer of the films Wetlands, Habit, Ambush and Edge of the World, both starring Jonathan Rhys Meyers; Mother Tongue, starring Josie Ho; Promises, directed by Amanda Sthers, as well as the documentaries Sheroes, Bonnie, and Josie Ho & The Hong Kong Sound. He has also been involved in such award-winning film and television projects as Crazy Rich Asians, Slumdog Millionaire, Training Day, The Wrestler, Sin City, Memoirs of a Geisha, and Star Trek: Discovery.

== Artist International Group ==
In 2017, Unger founded Artist International Group which focuses on identifying and nurturing talent, developing IP and sourcing diversified media and entertainment opportunities, all with a global insight. The company represents actors, writers, directors, musicians and models and specializes in media finance, brand advisory and international business development. AIG has offices in Los Angeles, New York and London and joint ventures in the UK, France, Korea, Hong Kong, Mexico, Spain and Brazil.

Unger represents several Academy Award, Golden Globe, Grammy and BAFTA winning clients and leading international artists including Jonathan Rhys Meyers, Mickey Rourke, Philippine Leroy-Beaulieu, Tom Welling, Til Schweiger, Gong Li, Leehom Wang, Sasha Luss, Anil Kapoor, Mallika Sherawat, Darko Peric, Kev Adams, Patrick Bruel, Elsa Zylberstein, Rossy de Palma, Lee Min-ho, Rafael Cebrian, Siwon Choi, Hanee Lee, Nastassja Kinski, Raline Shah, and Natalia Vodianova as well as directors Vadim Perelman, Ludovic Bernard, Michael Haussman, Francesco Carrozzini, Umut Aral, Antony Hoffman, Alexei Sidorov and Tony Kaye.

== Other activities ==
Unger is a member of the Board of Advisors of Big Life Foundation which contributes to efforts in protecting wildlife habitats in East Africa.
