= The Roosevelts (miniseries) =

2014 television film

- Blu-ray cover
- Also known as: The Roosevelts: An Intimate History
- Genre: Documentary
- Based on: The Roosevelts: An Intimate History by Geoffrey Ward and Ken Burns
- Written by: Geoffrey Ward
- Directed by: Ken Burns
- Starring: Paul Giamatti; Edward Herrmann; Meryl Streep
- Narrated by: Peter Coyote
- Theme music composer: David Cieri
- Country of origin: United States
- Original language: English
- No. of episodes: 7

Production
- Producers: Ken Burns; Paul Barnes; Pam Tubridy Baucom
- Cinematography: Buddy Squires; Allen Moore
- Editors: Paul Barnes; Tricia Reidy; Erik Ewers; Daniel J. White
- Running time: 13 hours, 10 minutes
- Production company: Florentine Films

Original release
- Network: PBS
- Release: September 14 – September 20, 2014

The Roosevelts: An Intimate History is a 2014 American documentary television miniseries directed and produced by Ken Burns. It covers the lives of the three most prominent members of the Roosevelt family – Theodore Roosevelt, a Republican and the 26th President of the United States; Franklin D. Roosevelt, a Democrat, the 32nd President of the United States, and fifth cousin of Theodore; and Eleanor Roosevelt, the longest-serving First Lady of the United States, a niece of Theodore, and wife of Franklin.

== Overview ==
As a result of the influence of Theodore and Franklin Roosevelts as Presidents, as well as Eleanor as First Lady, a modern democratic state of equal opportunity was begun in the United States. The series begins with the birth of Theodore in 1858 and ends with the death of Eleanor in 1962.

== Cast ==
The series is narrated by Peter Coyote. Actors read lines of various historical figures and a series of noted commentators give background information. They include:

- Paul Giamatti as the voice of Theodore Roosevelt
- Edward Herrmann as the voice of Franklin D. Roosevelt
- Meryl Streep as the voice of Eleanor Roosevelt
- John Lithgow as the voice of James Roosevelt I
- Patricia Clarkson as the voice of Margaret "Daisy" Suckley

Other voices include: Adam Arkin, Keith Carradine, Kevin Conway, Ed Harris, Josh Lucas, Carl Lumbly, Amy Madigan, Carolyn McCormick, Pamela Reed, Billy Bob Thornton, and Eli Wallach.

As themselves:

- Jonathan Alter
- H. W. Brands
- Blanche Wiesen Cook
- Doris Kearns Goodwin
- Edna Gurewitsch
- Clay S. Jenkinson
- William Leuchtenburg
- David McCullough
- Jon Meacham
- Patricia O'Toole
- Geoffrey C. Ward
- George Will

== Episodes ==
No.	Title	Original release date
1	"Get Action" (1858–1901)	September 14, 2014
Theodore, Franklin and Eleanor Roosevelt all overcame challenging circumstances early in their lives during the Gilded Age. As a result of the influence of Theodore and Franklin as Presidents, as well as Eleanor as First Lady, a modern democratic state of equal opportunity was begun in the United States.
2	"In the Arena" (1901–1910)	September 15, 2014
Theodore becomes the 26th President of the United States, fights corporate greed, builds the Panama Canal and helps preserve wilderness areas. Franklin marries Eleanor and enters politics by running for the New York state senate.
3	"The Fire of Life" (1910–1919)	September 16, 2014
Theodore pursues a progressive crusade and, as a result, compromises the Republican Party. Later, he promotes America's entry into World War I and, while considering another presidential run, dies in 1919. Franklin serves as Assistant Secretary of the Navy. He becomes involved with another woman and his relationship with Eleanor becomes a purely political partnership.
4	"The Storm" (1920–1933)	September 17, 2014
Franklin runs for Vice President of the United States but his party loses the election. The next year, he is stricken with a disabling paralytic illness. Eleanor develops a political life of her own. Franklin becomes Governor of New York and, later, runs for the office of President of the United States.
5	"The Rising Road" (1933–1939)	September 18, 2014
Franklin becomes the 32nd President of the United States, introduces the New Deal to help resolve the Great Depression and undertakes the issue of Adolf Hitler's rise in Germany. Eleanor provides Franklin with a liberal perspective and becomes, herself, a political force.
6	"The Common Cause" (1939–1944)	September 19, 2014
Franklin, after the Japanese attack on Pearl Harbor, promotes America's entry into World War II and eventual Allied victory. During wartime, Eleanor helps to maintain the earlier New Deal initiatives and comforts wounded troops in the Pacific.
7	"A Strong and Active Faith" (1944–1962)	September 20, 2014
Franklin wins a fourth term as president, plans for peacetime but dies while in office on April 12, 1945. Eleanor, after Franklin's death, promotes civil rights, civil liberties and the United Nations. She died in 1962 and was mourned as First Lady of the World.

== Reception ==
=== Critical response ===
The series premiered to positive reviews. According to critic James Poniewozik of Time magazine, "The Roosevelts tells the story of the American 20th century in triptych. Teddy (who became president in 1901) is progressivism, expansionism and reform. FDR is the rise of American power and the rewriting of the social contract. (Conservative pundit George Will sums up his legacy: the government would not just 'provide the conditions for the pursuit of happiness' but 'deliver happiness, understood as material well-being.') Eleanor looks ahead to postwar globalism and the move of women and minorities in from the margins." Further, Poniewozik states, "The Roosevelts brings up a kind of nature-nurture question: did these leaders make the times, or did the times make these leaders? It can't answer this question. But it does manage to tell an educational, emotional story of how these leaders and their times made us." Hank Stuever, critic at The Washington Post, writes, "Let's start with the end. When it's over — when you make it through the marathon that is Ken Burns's beautiful, seven-part documentary The Roosevelts: An Intimate History, ... you may find yourself with a lingering, nebulous grief. You're sorry it's over. You're sorry they're over. You're sorry a certain expression of American ideals is, or often appears to be, completely over." Timothy Egan of The New York Times wrote, "Ambitious and deeply moving."

=== Viewership ===
In September 2014, The Roosevelts became the most streamed documentary on the PBS website to date.

=== Accolades ===
The show was nominated for three Primetime Emmy Awards, winning one for Peter Coyote for Outstanding Narrator in the first episode.

== See also ==
- List of women's rights activists
- Political positions of Theodore Roosevelt
- The Roosevelt Story - 1947 documentary
- Sunrise at Campobello - 1960 film
- The Eleanor Roosevelt Story - 1965 biographical documentary film
- Eleanor and Franklin - 1976 TV miniseries
- Eleanor and Franklin: The White House Years - 1977 TV movie
- Rough Riders - 1997 TV miniseries
- Warm Springs - 2005 TV film
- Theodore Roosevelt Birthplace National Historic Site
- Theodore Roosevelt Inaugural National Historic Site
