= The Roosevelt Story =

- Theatrical release poster
- Directed by: Lawrence M. Klee
- Screenplay by: Lawrence M. Klee
- Produced by: Martin Levine; Oliver A. Unger
- Starring: Ed Begley; Gene Blakely; Kelly Flint; Canada Lee; Kenneth Lynch
- Edited by: Walter Klee
- Music by: Earl Robinson
- Production company: Tola Productions
- Distributed by: United Artists
- Release date: August 30, 1947
- Running time: 80 minutes
- Country: United States
- Language: English

The Roosevelt Story is a 1947 American documentary film written and directed by Lawrence M. Klee. The film is a documentary about the private and public life of Franklin D. Roosevelt. The film was narrated by Ed Begley, Gene Blakely, Kelly Flint, Canada Lee and Kenneth Lynch. The film was released on August 30, 1947, by United Artists.

== Synopsis ==
The Roosevelt Story opens with newsreel footage of President Franklin D. Roosevelt's funeral procession along Pennsylvania Avenue in Washington, D.C., following his death on April 12, 1945, before tracing his life from his birthplace and family home at Hyde Park, New York. The film covers Roosevelt's education through his graduation from Harvard University and his marriage to Eleanor Roosevelt, then follows his entry into politics, his work on Woodrow Wilson's 1912 presidential campaign, and his service as Assistant Secretary of the Navy.

The film documents his 1921 diagnosis with polio and rehabilitation at Warm Springs, Georgia, his election and reelection as Governor of New York, and his nomination as the Democratic presidential candidate at the party's 1932 convention, the first time a presidential nominee accepted his nomination in person. Also covered are the New Deal programs Roosevelt introduced during the Great Depression, among them the Works Progress Administration, the Public Works Administration, the Agricultural Adjustment Administration, the Civilian Conservation Corps, and the Tennessee Valley Authority.

To illustrate the hardship of the era, the film introduces a fictional composite character, "Joe, an average, forgotten man," who recounts his experiences as a transient worker. The film also depicts Roosevelt's fireside chats and his 1936 landslide reelection. It then turns to the rising international tensions of the late 1930s, the outbreak of World War II, Roosevelt's elections to unprecedented third and fourth terms, the attack on Pearl Harbor on December 7, 1941, the formal declaration of war, and the formation of the United Nations.

== Cast ==
- Ed Begley as Narrator
- Gene Blakely as Narrator
- Kelly Flint as Narrator
- Canada Lee as Narrator
- Kenneth Lynch as Narrator

== See also ==
- The Roosevelts (2014 documentary miniseries)
