= A Face of War =

- Directed by: Eugene S. Jones
- Produced by: Eugene S. Jones
- Cinematography: Eugene S. Jones
- Edited by: Jono Roberts
- Production company: E.S.J. Production in association with Landau/Unger
- Distributed by: Commonwealth United Entertainment
- Release date: May 10, 1968
- Running time: 72 minutes
- Country: United States
- Language: English

A Face of War is a 1968 documentary about the Vietnam War The New York Times called it "one of the great Vietnam documentaries.". The film was produced and directed by Eugene S. Jones (1925-2020) a Korean War news photographer who rose to fame alongside his twin brother Charles Jones. The Jones brothers initially worked for the Washington Times-Herald before moving to NBC and traveling to Korea, where they made the first films from jet fighters in combat and the only films of the Inchon landing. Eugene was hired by NBC Special Projects, becoming a Today Show producer in the late 1950s before working on A Face of War.

== Synopsis ==
In cinéma vérité style, without music or narration, the film documents the day-to-day ordeal of a Marine point squad working to resist the occupation of a South Vietnamese village by Viet Cong forces. The footage was captured in summer and fall 1966, following Mike Company, 3rd Battalion, 7th Marines (3/7) participating in a series of counterinsurgency operations in Bình Sơn District along the Song Tra Bong River.

The film opens with the platoon on a search-and-destroy patrol, which moves through a rice field and is ambushed by Viet Cong forces positioned across a river, leaving one man seriously wounded. The Marines spend much of the evening struggling to suppress enemy forces so a medevac helicopter can take the wounded man to safety. As night falls, a UH-34 helicopter finally arrives.

Later, Marines attend a chaplain service, followed by the company commander outlining the plan for Operation Jackson, an August 1966 effort to push Viet Cong away from the vital Route 1 corridor. After helicopter insertion, the team inadvertently sets off a booby trap while approaching a village. One squad uncovers punji stakes and tripwire booby traps, while another squad attempts to secure a loose water buffalo. The company receives instructions over the radio to clear suspected tunnels with satchel charges. Afterward, another booby trap downs a Marine, who is eventually medevaced. Later, the patrol takes enemy fire from a treeline in front of a village. Soon the village is shown on fire, as two Vietnamese civilians look on in sorrow.

Later a field hospital is shown in monsoon rains. Corpsmen make their way to a nearby village where they assist a Vietnamese villager's childbirth. Back at base, Marines play football in the mud. In a later scene, as flares dot a moonlit sky, Marines defending a perimeter recount the dangers of sappers moving at night, saying, "The only thing we really own is this hill right here." The company is then shown providing medical care to a rural village, part of the new Operation County Fair program intended to win support of rural villages by providing medical care, agricultural assistance, and political orientation.

A chaotic scene appears following an IED explosion beneath a 6x6 truck. The attack kills a tank battalion member and injures three Marines, two from a mortar platoon of 3rd Battalion. Members of 3/7 work to secure a perimeter and coordinate a helicopter medevac. In another scene, Marines coordinate the orderly evacuation of a rural village in an Amtrac armored vehicle, after which the village and the surrounding forest are cleared with explosives and napalm.

As faces, names, and epitaphs of Mike Company appear, a gloomy ballad plays, followed by footage of a squad of Marines walking into the distance on another mission.

== Aftermath and critical reception ==
Half the company was wounded during the filming, including the filmmaker, who was wounded twice. Roger Ebert called A Face of War a "heart-wrenching masterpiece".

Jones went on to produce commercials for the Richard Nixon campaign, then produced The Wild and the Brave in 1974 and the 1980 NBC made-for-TV thriller High Ice before retiring from entertainment.

== See also ==
- List of American films of 1968
- The Anderson Platoon, documentary of a US Army platoon in Vietnam in 1966
