= No Dough Boys =

1944 film by Jules White

- Directed by: Jules White
- Written by: Felix Adler
- Produced by: Jules White
- Starring: Moe Howard; Larry Fine; Curly Howard; Christine McIntyre; Vernon Dent; Kelly Flint; Judy Malcolm; Brian O'Hara; John Tyrrell; William Yip
- Cinematography: George Meehan
- Edited by: Charles Hochberg
- Distributed by: Columbia Pictures
- Release date: November 24, 1944 (U.S.)
- Running time: 16:54
- Country: United States
- Language: English

No Dough Boys is a 1944 short subject directed by Jules White starring American slapstick comedy team The Three Stooges (Moe Howard, Larry Fine and Curly Howard). It is the 82nd entry in the series released by Columbia Pictures starring the comedians, who released 190 shorts for the studio between 1934 and 1959.

== Plot ==
The Stooges find themselves inadvertently embroiled in a series of comedic misadventures while donning yellowface attire for a photo shoot depicting Japanese soldiers. Directed by their boss to maintain their costumes during their lunch break to expedite the shoot, the trio unwittingly becomes entangled in a case of mistaken identity.

Upon arriving at a restaurant, the Stooges are mistaken for Japanese soldiers by the apprehensive owner, triggered by a newspaper headline reporting the escape of three Japanese individuals. Their escape from the restaurant leads them into an alley where they stumble upon a hidden door, gaining access to the lair of a Nazi spy named Hugo.

Mistaking the Stooges for the escaped Japanese soldiers, Hugo decides to exploit their presence to impress his associates. The Stooges, eager to prove themselves, engage in a series of comedic antics, including teaching jujitsu to women and performing acrobatic stunts. However, their efforts are complicated when the real Japanese soldiers arrive, leading to a chaotic confrontation in which the Stooges ultimately emerge triumphant, albeit through a series of mishaps involving misidentification under flickering lights.

== Cast ==
=== Credited ===
- Moe Howard as Moe
- Larry Fine as Larry
- Curly Howard as Curly
- Vernon Dent as Hugo
- Christine McIntyre as Celia Zweiback

=== Uncredited ===
- Kelly Flint as Amelia Schwartzbrot
- Judy Malcolm as Stelia Pumpernickel
- Brian O'Hara as Waiter
- John Tyrrell as Photographer
- Warren Kening as Joe the photoshoot model
- William Yip as Waki
- Joe Chan as Saki
- Orson Tanaka as Naki

== Production notes ==
No Dough Boys was filmed on April 25–28, 1944. The film title is a play on "No-No Boys," Japanese-Americans who answered "no" to a two-part loyalty question that asked them to renounce the Japanese emperor and agree to serve in the U.S. Armed Forces. It is also a play on the nickname for American infantrymen in the previous world war, known as a doughboy.

During World War II, the Stooges made a few comedies that engaged in propaganda against the Empire of Japan, including Spook Louder, Booby Dupes, No Dough Boys and The Yoke's on Me.

The gag of smoking an imaginary pipe was used twice by Laurel and Hardy: 1937's Way Out West and 1938's Block-Heads.

Curly's utterance of "Manchewie" is likely a reference to the World War II nation of "Manchukuo", the Japanese puppet state founded by the Empire of Japan after its occupation of Manchuria.
