= George Leech (actor) =

British actor and stunt performer (1921–2012)

George Leech (6 December 1921 – 17 June 2012) was a British film actor and stunt performer who was notable for his work on eleven James Bond films.

== Biography ==
Leech was born in London and left school at 14. He was a boxer who won the ABA National Championships when he was 15 as a welterweight and he joined the Royal Navy in 1943.

== Film career ==
His first job in movies was performing a stunt involving falling down steps doubling for James Mason in Odd Man Out (1947). He was notable for his contributions to James Bond films from 1962 to 1985 as a stunt performer and in small acting roles (usually as a henchman) including: Dr. No (1962), Goldfinger (1964), Thunderball (1965), On Her Majesty's Secret Service (1969), where he was promoted to stunt arranger when Bob Simmons was working on another film, For Your Eyes Only (1981), and A View to a Kill (1985). He also worked on The Guns of Navarone, Chitty Chitty Bang Bang, Kelly's Heroes, The Eagle Has Landed and Revenge of the Pink Panther.

== Personal life ==
Leech married in 1952. One of his two daughters Wendy Leech became one of the first female stunt performers and married the stuntman Vic Armstrong. Leech died in Cardiff in 2012 at the age of 90.

== Filmography ==
Year	Title	Role	Notes
1956	Port Afrique	Second Arab	
1959	The Treasure of San Teresa	Man In Fight	Uncredited
1960	And the Same to You	Jake	
1962	Billy Budd	Marine	Uncredited
1964	Carry On Spying	Waiter	Uncredited
1964	Goldfinger	Man in Bulletproof Vest at Q Branch	Uncredited
1964	The Curse of the Mummy's Tomb	Ship Attacker	Uncredited
1964	Mozambique	Carl	
1965	Coast of Skeletons	Carlo Seton	
1965	The Face of Fu Manchu	Manchu Minion	Uncredited
1965	Thunderball	Disco Volante Crewman	Uncredited
1966	Se tutte le donne del mondo...		
1968	Chitty Chitty Bang Bang	Chitty's original driver	Uncredited
1969	On Her Majesty's Secret Service	Strangled SPECTRE Skier	Uncredited
1971	Diamonds Are Forever	Mr. Kidd	Uncredited
1971	When Eight Bells Toll	Thug	Uncredited
1971	Puppet on a Chain	Thug	Uncredited
1975	Brannigan	Man in Bar	Uncredited
1976	The Pink Panther Strikes Again	Mr. Stutterstutt	
1976	The Eagle Has Landed	Sturmbannführer Straub	Uncredited
1977	The Spy Who Loved Me	Cortina Gunman #2	Uncredited
1978	The Wild Geese	Stone	Uncredited
1978	Revenge of the Pink Panther	Asylum Policeman	Uncredited
1978	Superman	Man in Office	Uncredited
1979	Moonraker	Drax's henchman	Uncredited
1980	North Sea Hijack	Magnussen	
1981	For Your Eyes Only	Henchman Shark Victim	Uncredited
1985	A View to a Kill	Miner Gunned Down by Zorin	Uncredited, (final film role)
