= Stephen A. Unger =

American recruiter (born 1946)

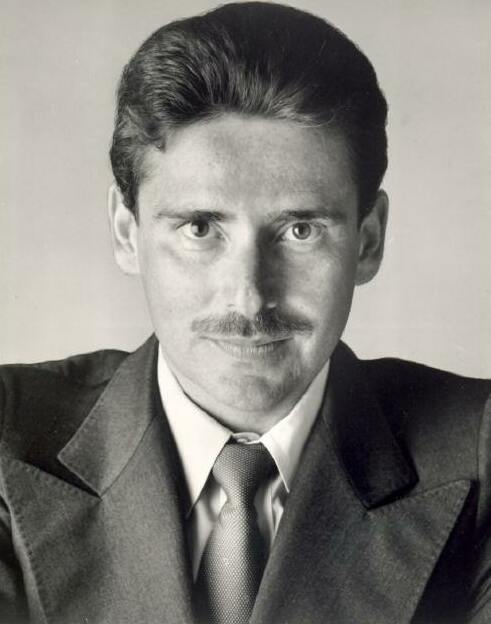
- Unger in 1986
- Born: May 31, 1946 (age 80); New York, NY

Stephen A. Unger (born May 31, 1946) is an American "leading executive recruiter" who served as managing partner of the media and entertainment divisions at the three largest executive search firms in the world. From 2004 to 2005 he wrote a regular weekly column on leadership for the Daily Variety, a trade publication considered to be the "Bible of Show Business."

== Early life ==
Son of award-winning film producer, distributor and exhibitor Oliver A. Unger, Stephen Unger was born in New York City, and lived there until age 13 when he and his family, including older brother Anthony B. "Tony" Unger and three sisters, moved to Southern California, settling in Beverly Hills. Unger graduated from Beverly Hills High School in 1963, from Syracuse University's Maxwell School of Citizenship and Public Affairs in 1967 and attended New York University’s Graduate Institute of Film and Television.

== Foster's Hollywood ==
Unger speaks six languages — English, French, Spanish, Italian, German and Portuguese — and has lived and worked in various countries outside the United States for over ten years.

In 1971, while living in Spain, he and his brother Anthony, along with two friends, co-founded, built, owned and operated Foster's Hollywood — Spain’s first American-food/Hollywood-themed restaurants. He and his partners sold the restaurant chain in 1976. As of 2009, Foster's Hollywood is the 11th largest franchise restaurant chain in Europe with over 140 restaurants in Spain.

== Film producer and distributor ==
Unger served as associate producer on the Emmy Award-winning 1978 telefeature Verna: USO Girl, starring Sissy Spacek, William Hurt and Howard Da Silva. Subsequently, he held a number of senior corporate positions, including Vice President, International Sales and Acquisitions of Universal Pictures (NBC Universal); Vice President, International Distribution of CBS Theatrical Films (CBS, Inc.) and Senior Vice President, International Sales of Filmways Pictures, Inc. (later absorbed into MGM).

In March 1982, Stephen Unger established Unger Int'l Distributors Inc and, in 1984, he and his brother Anthony founded The Unger Co. Based in Hollywood, the corporation was conceived as "a cross fertilization of producing, distributing and co-financing motion pictures and television product". Its most successful activities were in overseas distribution of major studio American films on behalf of such clients as Procines S.A. in Spain, Parkfilm S.A. in Switzerland, Conate S.A. in Chile and Rediffusion Swiss Cable. Some of the motion pictures acquired by Unger International Distributors on behalf of its territorial distributors included Amadeus, Cabaret, The Chosen, Intermezzo, Notorious, The Outsiders, Spellbound and They Shoot Horses, Don't They?.

At the time of the corporation's founding, Unger stated that, "As a matter of fact and pride, when my brother and I joined forces we were carrying on a family tradition started in 1934 when our late father Oliver A. Unger began his own career in the movie industry". He continued, "In an industry where we have spent our entire working careers, we have established valuable relationships on every level of production, distribution and exhibition, both nationally and internationally. In a sense, Tony and I working together is the fulfillment of a family dream".

== Executive recruiter ==
In 1988, Unger became an executive recruiter and joined Korn/Ferry International, where he served as a Partner and a Managing Director of its Worldwide Entertainment and Communications Practice. He remained there until 1991 when he joined Spencer Stuart as a Partner and Managing Director of its Worldwide Entertainment and Communications Practice. In 1998, Unger joined Heidrick & Struggles’ Global Media and Entertainment Practice as managing partner and news of his own recruitment to the firm was reported on the front page of the Wall Street Journal. In 2003, he started KSMU LLC, a boutique executive search firm.

Leonard Armato, longtime Association of Volleyball Professionals Commissioner, described Unger "as one of the top people in sports and entertainment as far as searching for top executives" and he has been recognized by The Sporting News' 14-member panel of executives and editors in their annual "100 Most Powerful" list, including #63 in 2001. He has also been named #65 on CableFAX Magazine's “100 Most Influential in Cable” List.

Unger led the recruitment search for Michael Wolf in his move from Booz Allen to McKinsey & Company in 2001, which "shook up the industry." He has been quoted in the media regarding senior executive searches, succession plans, remuneration, employee retention, and contract negotiations, as well as market trends and suggestions for terminated employees. He has been invited to speak as a guest lecturer at a number of major universities, including Stanford and UCLA. Since its inception in 2012, Unger is a co-founding member of non-profit VoteRiders' Board of Directors and serves as chairman of its governance committee.

His wife of over 40 years is Kathleen Unger, M.B.A., J.D. Mrs. Unger is Of Counsel at the law firm Freeman, Freeman & Smiley as well as founder, chairman and president of the non-profit organization VoteRiders.
