= Resolution (talent agency) =

Talent and literary agency with headquarters in Los Angeles, California

- Company type: Private
- Industry: Talent and Literary Agencies
- Founded: Los Angeles, California, USA (2013)
- Headquarters: Los Angeles, California; New York City, New York; Beijing, China
- Key people: Jeff Berg, Chairman and CEO; David A. Unger, Agent
- Website: Resolution Talent & Literary Agency

Resolution was a talent and literary agency with headquarters in Los Angeles, California. It was formed by Jeff Berg, the former chairman of ICM Partners. Resolution represents artists including Lindsay Lohan, Roman Polanski, Molly Ringwald, David Duchovny, Gina Gershon, and Haley Joel Osment. As of 2014, the year it went out of business, Resolution was one of the ten largest agencies in the United States.

== Formation ==
On January 28, 2013, Berg left ICM after the management buyout in October 2012, and opened Resolution. The new agency was capitalized with a $200 million investment from Jahm Najafi, a former Salomon Brothers banker active in private equity.

== Closure ==
In March 2014, Bison Capital, a Chinese investment firm, made an investment in Resolution. During 2014, the agency saw the departure of several key agents. In October 2014, it was reported that Bison Capital had withdrawn its funding, and the agency would close down its operations.
