= Mozambique (film) =

1964 film by Robert Lynn

- Original film poster
- Directed by: Robert Lynn
- Screenplay by: Peter Yeldham
- Story by: Harry Alan Towers
- Produced by: Harry Alan Towers; Oliver A. Unger
- Starring: Steve Cochran; Hildegard Knef; Paul Hubschmid; Vivi Bach
- Cinematography: Martin Curtis
- Edited by: Peter Boita
- Music by: Johnny Douglas
- Production company: Towers of London Productions
- Distributed by: British Lion Films
- Release date: December 1964
- Running time: 98 minutes
- Countries: United Kingdom; South Africa
- Language: English

Mozambique (also known as Blonde Fracht Für Sansibar) is a 1964 British drama film directed by Robert Lynn and starring Steve Cochran, Hildegard Knef, Paul Hubschmid and Vivi Bach. The screenplay was by Peter Yeldham.

== Premise ==
An American pilot assists the Portuguese colonial police who are battling a gang of criminals involved in drug smuggling from Lisbon via Mozambique to Zanzibar.

== Cast ==
- Steve Cochran as Brad Webster
- Hildegard Knef as Ilona Valdez
- Paul Hubschmid as Commarro
- Vivi Bach as Christina
- Dietmar Schönherr as Henderson
- Martin Benson as Da Silva
- George Leech as Carl
- Gert Van den Bergh as Arab

== Production ==
During the making of the film, Cochran was arrested for committing adultery with the wife of a jockey while in Durban, South Africa.

== Reception ==
The Monthly Film Bulletin wrote: "Not just a succession of improbabilities and melodramatics but a nice old tangle to boot, the film has among its more original touches the Portuguese police inspector's readiness to leave almost all the sleuthing to Brad: even at the Victoria Falls Bridge climax, the inspector simply surveys the scene from safety while Brad does all the dangerous leg-work. Vivi Bach is a real charmer, but despite a stunningly feminine wardrobe by Pierre Balmain, Hildegard Knef contrives to look unglamorous and at times almost mannish. Perhaps it is the unaccustomed setting offered by Mozambique which makes the film more entertaining than its few merits would seem to warrant."

Boxoffice wrote: "A missing briefcase and a few cases of brief murder are intermingled in a not-so-scenic area of Mozambique, the East African colony. Indeed, the scenery, with the exception of the final chase sequence in the bridge area around the famed Victoria Falls, might have been that of the Pacific Palisades near Hollywood for all the atmosphere gained. The indoor and outdoor shots made by cameraman Martin Curtis add little to the mood, with few exceptions. The late Steve Cochran contributes a thoroughly professional job of acting and, hence, stands out head and shoulders above the rest of the cast. ... The technical credits are adequate and plot substitutes for pace."

The New York Times called it "a sleazy little melodrama."
