= Silent Rage =

1982 film by Michael Miller

- Theatrical release poster
- Directed by: Michael Miller
- Written by: Joseph Fraley
- Produced by: Anthony B. Unger
- Starring: Chuck Norris; Ron Silver; Steven Keats; Toni Kalem; William Finley; Brian Libby; Stephen Furst; Joyce Ingle
- Cinematography: Robert Jessup; Neil Roach
- Edited by: Richard C. Meyer
- Music by: Peter Bernstein; Mark Goldenberg
- Production company: Topkick Productions
- Distributed by: Columbia Pictures
- Release date: April 2, 1982
- Running time: 100 minutes
- Country: United States
- Language: English
- Box office: $10.5 million (US)

Silent Rage is a 1982 American sci-fi action horror film directed by Michael Miller. It stars Chuck Norris as a sheriff who must stop a mentally ill man (Brian Libby) who goes on a rampage after being granted indestructibility in a medical experiment. It grossed $10.5 million on release.

== Plot ==
In a small Texas town, John Kirby, a mentally ill man, kills two members of the family with whom he was staying. Sheriff Daniel "Dan" Stevens and his deputy, Charlie, respond and eventually arrest John, but he breaks out of the handcuffs, overpowers the other officers and grabs a shotgun, forcing the officers to shoot him.

Severely injured and near death, John is transported to an institute where his psychiatrist, Dr. Thomas "Tom" Halman, works along with Dr. Phillip Spires and Dr. Paul Vaughn, two doctors and geneticists. To save John, Phillip proposes treating him with a formula created by himself and Paul to enhance cellular strength and regeneration. Tom objects to its use due to John's psychosis, and Phillip pretends to agree but later administers the formula anyway once Tom leaves. Revived and rendered nearly mute but virtually invulnerable, John escapes from the institute and tracks Tom to his home, having overheard Tom telling Phillip to allow John to die earlier. Meanwhile, Dan invites Tom's sister Alison, whom he is romancing, on a trip. John breaks into Tom's home and the two fight. Despite shooting John several times and pushing him down a flight of stairs, Tom is killed. Tom's wife Nancy finds her husband's body and is killed by John as well. Alison arrives to pick up her gear for the trip and discovers her brother and sister-in-law's corpses, but John flees as Dan and Charlie arrive with the police.

Dan and Charlie take Alison to the institute, unaware that John has also returned there to get Phillip and Paul to treat his wounds. Realizing that the situation is out of control, Phillip leaves to examine samples while Paul attempts to kill John by injecting him with acid. John survives and kills Paul after a brief struggle by stabbing him with the syringe. After finding Paul's body, Phillip returns to his office, where he briefly speaks to John about the success of their experiment. John initially seems to understand Phillip but ultimately snaps his neck. With Dan at the county coroner's office, Charlie and Alison discover John killing another of the institute workers; Charlie attempts to arrest him but is mortally wounded when John breaks his back. Dan returns just in time to discover Charlie dying and protects Alison from John.

Dan shoots John and knocks him out of a window, but John revives and nearly kills Dan. John hangs on to Dan's car as Dan and Allison try to escape and climbs into its back window, forcing them to jump out. The car crashes and explodes, lighting John on fire. This injures him, but he jumps into a nearby lake and quickly recovers. With Alison watching, Dan and John engage in hand-to-hand combat. Both men score blows, but Dan overwhelms John by roundhouse kicking him several times before throwing him into a nearby well, seemingly killing him. With John's carnage at an end, Dan and Alison leave. However, deep in the well, John suddenly bursts from the water, having survived.

== Cast ==
- Chuck Norris as Sheriff Daniel "Dan" Stevens
- Ron Silver as Dr. Tom Halman
- Steven Keats as Dr. Phillip Spires
- Toni Kalem as Alison Halman
- William Finley as Dr. Paul Vaughn
- Brian Libby as John Kirby
- Stephen Furst as Charlie
- Joyce Ingle as Mrs. Sims
- Jay De Plano as Bike Leader
- Lillette Zoe Raley as Biker Mama

== Production ==
Michael Miller had directed two features, the last of which was Jackson County Jail. He was offered the film by executive producer Paul Lewis, although he says Tony Unger "was really the mover and shaker who was essential to the whole thing." He says "The reason Chuck Norris wanted to do the picture – and I think it was the reason we all wanted to do the picture – is because it was a major studio picture."

Miller said the film was written with Chuck Norris in mind. "You don't hire Chuck Norris not to do karate. It wasn't like it was an old John Wayne script that they ended up giving to Chuck. He does his thing. I think the idea was to try and broaden the audience in that it wasn't a karate movie. In my mind, it was a Frankenstein movie. It was like Frankenstein meets Chuck."

Miller said the film was not inspired by slasher movies. "I'm not a fan of those. When I read it, I thought that it was Frankenstein. That's what I was heading towards. We'll have the mad scientists bringing this guy back to life. Chuck will have to try to apprehend him."

Miller said Brian Libby was a stunt man who was a friend of Aaron Norris. "He reminded me of Lee Marvin. He came in and I thought, Okay, this guy can play Frankenstein's creature. He was a real cooperative kind of guy. He never balked about anything. I put him in a silver suit, and put him through a lot. A lot of other actors would have thought that was beneath them, but he wasn't like that."

Miller said Stephen Furst's character was like Andy Devine. The story that Furst's character tells Norris about the dog came from Furst.

Filming began on July 30, 1981, in Dallas. It took 30 days. Director Michael Miller called the film "kung fu meets Frankenstein".

Miller says Norris was most comfortable fighting. The actor improvised a love scene with Toni Kalem, "and that was a big deal for him", said Miller. "I said, 'Just talk and have fun', I told him. He did, and it's a nice little scene."

== Release ==
The film was released on DVD by Sony Pictures Home Entertainment in 2001.

RiffTrax released Silent Rage on demand on September 6, 2013.

== Reception ==
=== Box office ===
The film was released theatrically in the United States by Columbia Pictures in April 1982. It grossed $10,490,791 at the box office.

=== Critical response ===
On Rotten Tomatoes, the film holds an approval rating of 57% based on 7 reviews. On Metacritic the film has a weighted average score of 31 out of 100, based on 6 critics, indicating "generally unfavorable reviews".

Variety wrote that the film "seems as if it were made with a demographics sampler entitled '10 Sleazy Ways To Cash In On The Exploitation Market.' The only trouble is the filmmakers have employed all ten techniques in one picture. The result is a combination horror-kung-fu-oater-woman-in-peril-mad-scientist film with more unintentional laughs than probably appear possible in the space of 100 minutes." John Corry of The New York Times thought that the only interesting scenes are those with the mad scientists, as Norris has "no screen presence to speak of". Rita Kempley of The Washington Post called Norris' martial arts "a curious footnote in a formula horror film". Kevin Thomas of the Los Angeles Times praised the "shrewd, witty script". Richard Christiansen of the Chicago Tribune gave the film two-and-a-half stars out of four and wrote, "As in Jackson County Jail, his 1976 sleeper hit, Miller has given some inventive, energetic touches to a crude formula film. He doesn't deal in sophisticated material, but he's surprisingly sophisticated in the way he handles his raw material." Jimmy Summers wrote in BoxOffice magazine, "How you take all this depends a great deal on whether you accept it as tongue-in-cheek satire or simply dismiss it as dumb filmmaking. Considering how corny and obvious most of it is, you hope for the sake of the filmmakers they meant to be tongue-in-cheek."

Norris said that he received negative feedback from fans over his love scenes. He subsequently resolved to avoid them in the future.

== Potential sequel ==
Miller had hoped to make sequels, but didn't believe Norris would be interested. "At the end, the guy is still not dead. But that never happened. I would have liked that. You can see that this guy is not a slasher. He kills people the way Frankenstein's creature kills people. He throws them and bang. I don't think this was one of Chuck's favorite pictures. He went to the screening, and I think that was the last time I ever saw him. He seemed to enjoy it, but he wasn't sure it was going to work. It was outside of the formulas he'd been doing. I think he was too much of a gentleman to ever say, 'I don't like this.' I just don't think this was in his wheelhouse. He didn't do any more slasher type pictures."

== See also ==
- List of American films of 1982
- Chuck Norris filmography
