= Foster's Hollywood =

Restaurant chain operating in Spain and Portugal

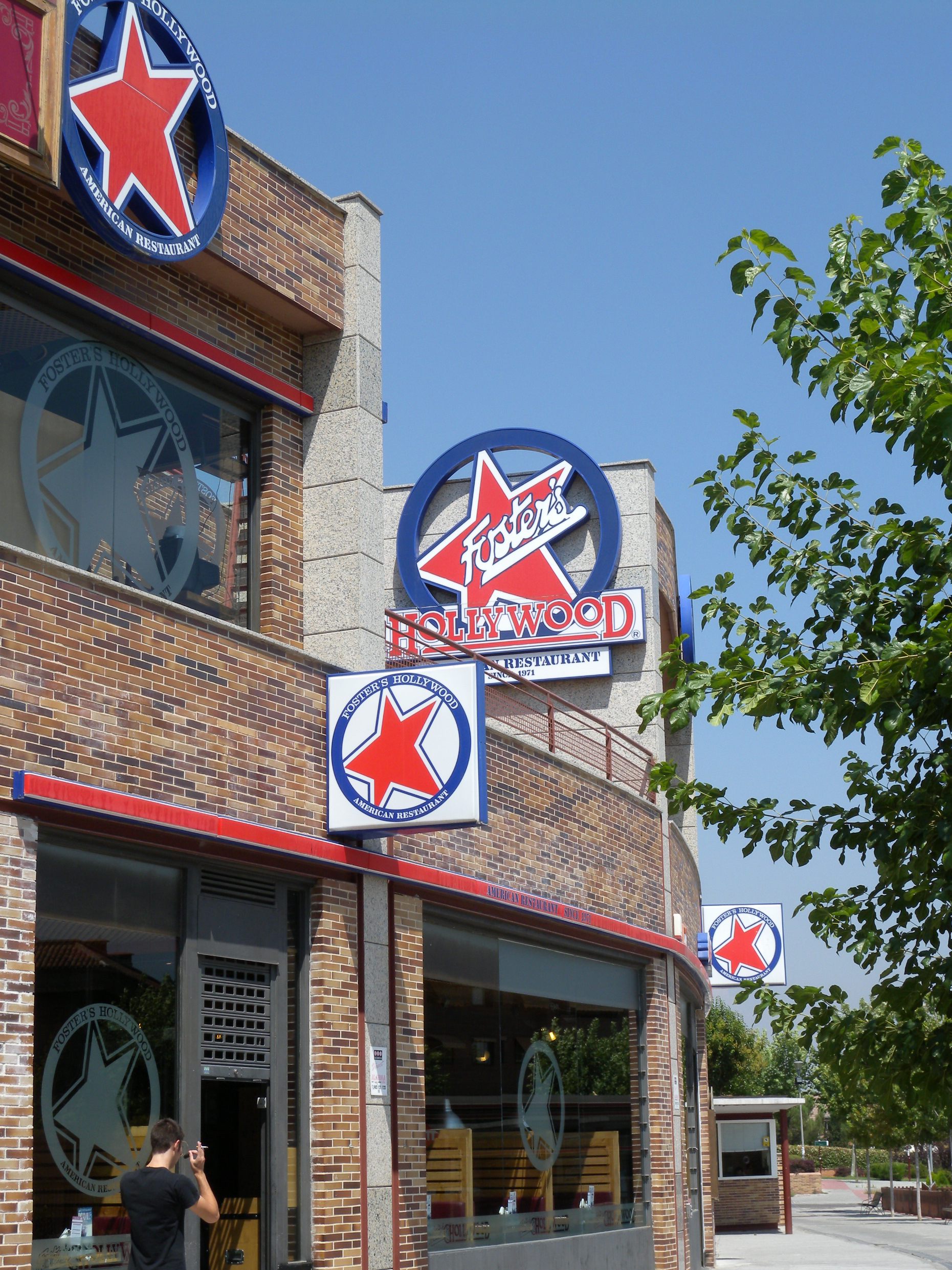
- Trade name: Foster's Hollywood
- Type: Sociedad Anónima
- Industry: Restaurant
- Founded: Madrid (1971)
- Founders: Mark Brownstein; Doug Delfeld; Anthony B. Unger; Stephen A. Unger
- Headquarters: Madrid, Spain
- Number of locations: 198
- Area served: Spain and Portugal
- Products: American food
- Owner: Zena Restaurants
- Website: fostershollywood.menu-res.net

Foster's Hollywood is a chain of casual dining American food restaurants located in Spain and Portugal, serving hamburgers and Tex-Mex cuisine. As of 2026, it operates 198 locations.

== History ==
The enterprise was founded in 1971 by four young Californians residing in Spain (Mark Brownstein, Douglas Delfeld and the brothers Anthony B. and Stephen A. Unger) all of whom were directly connected to filmmaking and missed authentic American food. In September 1972 the premier restaurant of the chain opened at 1 Magallanes Street in the middle of Madrid. and evolved into the first American-style restaurant chain in Spain and one of the first in Europe. A reporter for The New York Times wrote in his review of the establishment that you could probably eat there “the best fried battered onion rings in the world.”

The first restaurant was an immediate success. According to the 1973 Los Angeles Times article, "A Star Is Born - Spanish Burgers a la Hollywood": “Seven nights a week the crowds, resembling a lineup at movieland film premiere, queue up” outside Foster’s Hollywood. “As many as 150 Spaniards and tourists alike wait patiently for the maitre d’s signal while an equal number jam the cavernous hamburger haven.” The article continued, “What inspired the California quartet to gamble $1 million on burgers and french fries? In the words of Stephen Unger: ‘We couldn’t find a good American restaurant in Madrid ourselves'."

With this flagship venue, the chain was created and, by 1994, 22 restaurants were successfully serving customers in Spain and Portugal. At that point, the concept was tested in the United States, specifically in Florida. Following an opening in Tampa, six additional locations (two in Tampa, three in Orlando and one in Lakeland) began operating and plans were initiated to open an eighth in Kissimmee. However, the company abruptly changed its strategy and closed all its Florida restaurants during 1996, even though some of those were open less than a year.

== Recent activity ==
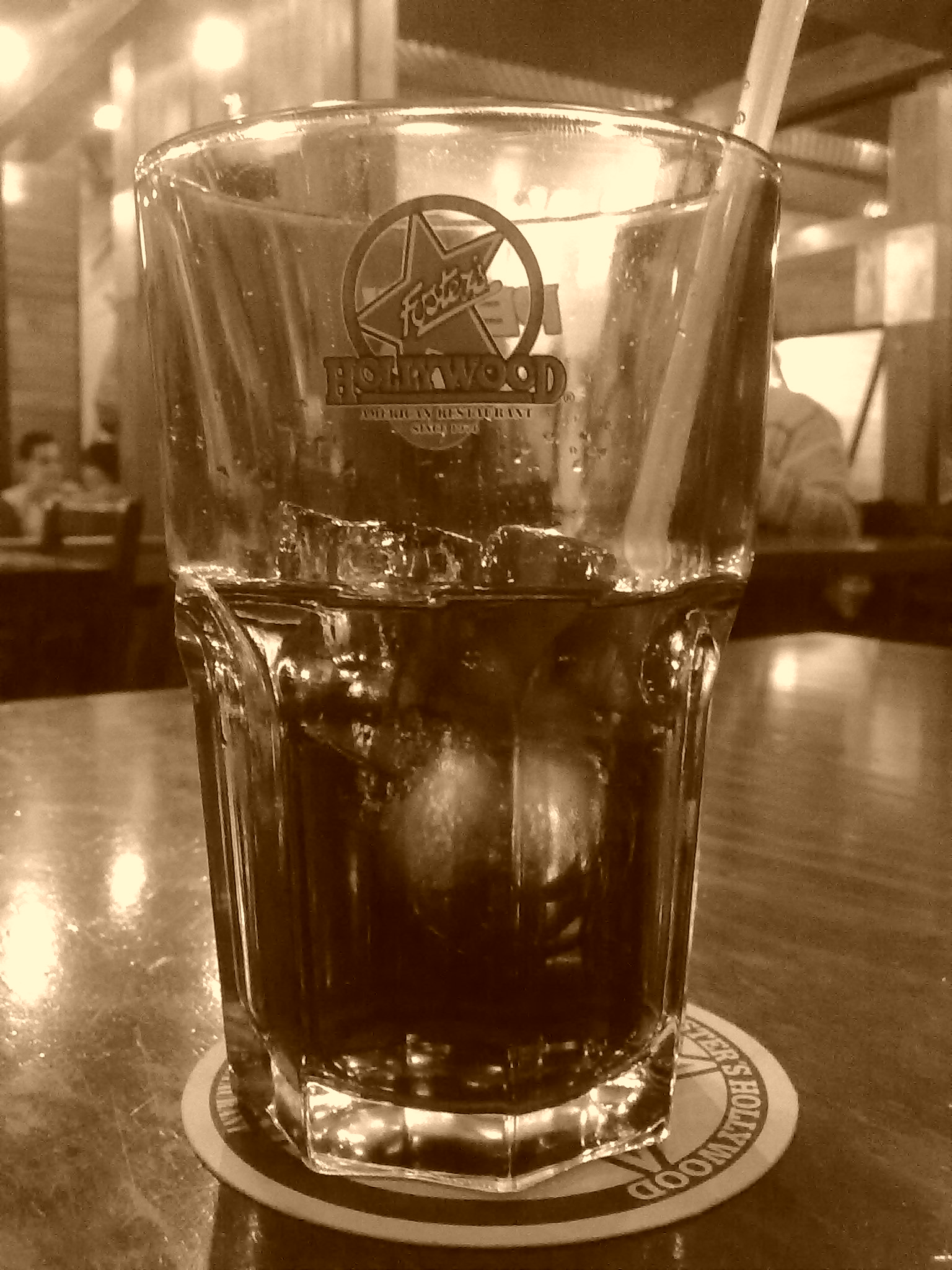
Foster's Hollywood restaurant in Portugal

In 1997, the four founders of Foster’s Hollywood were invited to Madrid by the chain's owners — Grupo Zena — to celebrate the enterprise’s 25th anniversary. The event was covered extensively by Spanish print media (El País) as well as national radio and television. By 2012 the chain had 28 restaurants in Madrid alone, with a total of 186 throughout Spain and Portugal. A high proportion of its restaurants are franchises, which are overseen by Grupo Zena and Grupo Alsea.

Every restaurant with the Foster’s Hollywood brand shares the same aesthetic — infused by Hollywood atmosphere and movie mythology, with numerous film posters covering the interior walls. There is a rustic essence with emphasis upon wooden furniture while, on the tables, the chain uses glassware and dishes faithful to American style. Its paperware features personalized graphics highlighting promotions and menu specials.

The menu includes Tex-Mex cuisine, roasted ribs, steaks, sandwiches, fresh salads and — as the emblematic and iconic dish for which the chain was established and became famous — hamburgers cooked on the barbecue. Especially characteristic of Foster’s Hollywood is its Halloween celebration, when all the restaurants are elaborately transformed inside and out, which includes the wearing of costumes by the staff.
