= Mary Jones (actress) =

Welsh actress (1915–1990)

Mary Jones (20 February 1915 – 31 March 1990) was a Welsh film actress.

Jones was born in Rhayader, Radnorshire. She appeared in films like Hay Fever (1946), Celestial Fire (1928), The Big Chance (1957), The Promise (1969) and Under Milk Wood (1972).

== Filmography ==
Year	Title	Role	Notes
1949	Trottie True	Gladys True	Uncredited
1953	Black Orchid	Mrs. Humphries	
1953	The Steel Key		Uncredited
1953	Valley of Song	1st. Neighbour	Uncredited
1954	The Happiness of Three Women	Mary Lewis	
1955	One Jump Ahead	Mrs. Snell	
1955	Timeslip	Sister Brown	Uncredited
1955	A Time to Kill	Florence Cole	
1956	The Narrowing Circle		
1956	Doublecross	Mrs. Simms	
1956	The Battle of the River Plate	Ms. Shaw	Uncredited
1957	The Hypnotist	Valentine's Mother	Uncredited
1957	Account Rendered	Nella Langford	
1957	The Big Chance	Miss Jessop	
1960	Carry On Constable	Radio Actress	Voice, Uncredited
1961	Touch of Death	Mrs. Baxter	
1969	The Promise	Mother	
1971	Under Milk Wood	Mrs. Beynon	
