= VoteRiders =

American voting non-profit

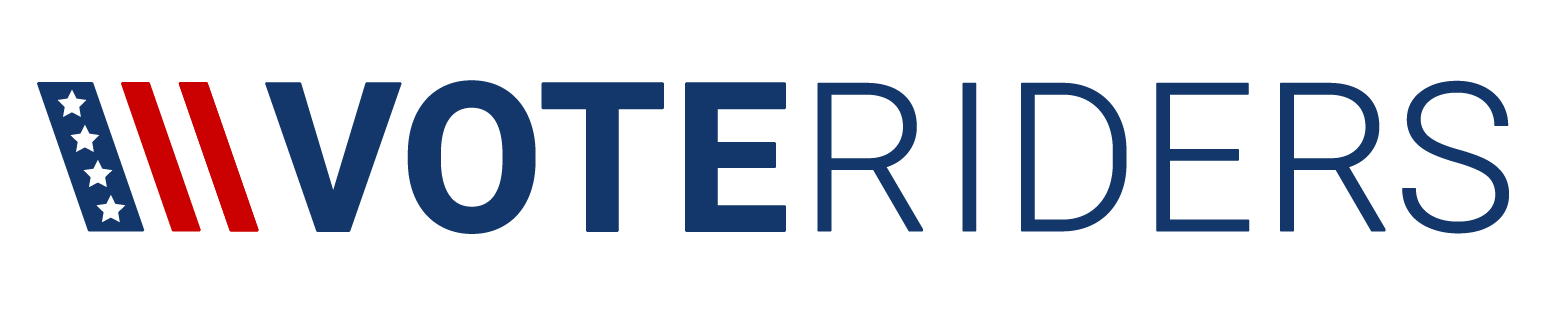
- Formation: 2012; 14 years ago
- Founder: Kathleen Unger
- Type: Non-profit organization
- Tax ID no.: 45-5081831
- Legal status: 501(c)(3) organization
- Purpose: Voting rights Voter ID Get out the vote
- Headquarters: Santa Monica, California
- Region served: United States
- President: Lauren Kunis
- CEO: Lauren Kunis
- Chair of the Board: Eric Tapia
- Website: www.voteriders.org

VoteRiders is an American non-partisan, non-profit 501(c)(3) organization whose mission is to ensure that all U.S. citizens over 18 years old are able to exercise their right to vote. One of its main focuses is assisting citizens who want to secure their voter ID, and VoteRiders collaborates with other organizations in these efforts.

VoteRiders is the leading nonpartisan voting rights organization providing voter ID solutions In the United States.

== Voter information and resources ==
VoteRiders helps voters overcome voting obstacles through:

- State-by-state information about voter ID requirements
- Toll free helpline that citizens can call or text for voter ID information and assistance
- Payment of costs, arrangement of appointments, acquisition of documents
- Transportation information: VoteRiders helps address transportation barriers
- VoteRiders' Voter ID Chatbot is available via SMS, Facebook Messenger and website chat, allowing voters across the country to get real-time guidance from VoteRiders

== Overview and mission ==
VoteRiders was founded in 2012 by Kathleen Unger, an election integrity specialist, and is headquartered in Santa Monica, California.

To promote the cause of ballot access nationwide, VoteRiders has broadened its website to be a comprehensive portal for state-by-state information about voter ID requirements and has developed printable wallet cards that highlight the IDs specified in each state's voter ID law in English and Spanish, which are available on its website. They also established a toll free helpline that citizens can call or text for voter ID information and assistance.

The non-profit's voter outreach includes holding Voter ID Clinics, which provide direct aid to local communities to assist citizens in obtaining critical documents like birth certificates and proof of citizenship. The VoteRiders volunteer team participates in outreach such as research, training, tabling, phone- and text-banking as well as letter-writing. VoteRiders partners with national organizations such as the Election Protection Coalition and Rock the Vote as well as state and local organizations.

== Research and analysis ==
The 2023 study conducted by VoteRiders and the University of Maryland Center for Democracy and Civic Engagement analysis shows that nearly 29,000,000 voting-age Americans do not possess a non-expired, government-issued photo ID. Young people, people of color, and women, are the groups most burdened by Voter ID laws. A June 2024 study by VoteRiders and the Center found 21 million of voting age did not have a current driver's license.

Voter ID laws vary nationwide. According to a study cited in Journalist's Resource, a reference desk established by the Shorenstein Center on Media, Politics and Public Policy at Harvard University, the "evidence supports the notion that strict voter identification laws prevent otherwise eligible individuals from voting, and have disproportionately negative impacts on minority citizens."

The Rockefeller Foundation reports that VoteRiders has achieved reaching over 7 million voters directly with ID information and assistance with a dedicated group of 9,000 volunteers, in the 2022 election cycle.

== Voter ID work ==
In 2018, an NBC News article noted that VoteRiders is highly effective in its grassroots efforts to help eligible voters obtain ID while other organizations fight restrictive laws in the judicial system. A law professor and voting experts quoted in the article said that challenging strict laws in court and helping citizens comply with existing rules at the same time is essential.

A 2019 documentary narrated by Jeffrey Wright, Rigged: The Voter Suppression Playbook, included clips that featured VoteRiders.

An interview with Kathleen Unger in the January 6, 2021 issue of Ms. described her as "one of the leading experts and legal minds when it comes to election protection" and quotes her that "VoteRiders was born of outrage - my outrage that people will be deprived of their right to vote."

On April 27, 2021, Unger was interviewed by ABC News' Devin Dwyer where she spoke of the urgency of voter ID efforts in the face of new voting requirements being enacted in multiple US states.

In 2022, thirty-six states in the U.S. had voter ID laws. Twelve of those states had "strict" voter ID laws which may have required voters who did not have an acceptable form of ID to submit a provisional ballot and seven of those required a valid photo ID. "[A] trans voter might very likely find themselves in a situation where they present an ID that doesn't necessarily align with the name or the gender that they currently identify(...) They're more likely to face sort of outright mechanical challenges when it comes to voting," said Lauren Kunis, CEO and executive director of VoteRiders. Since the 2020 election, eleven states have passed new or stricter voter ID laws, which could play a significant role in election outcomes, according to Kunis.

In November 2023, Newsweek published an article highlighting an election warning from VoteRiders about voter confusion following passage of a spate of new voter ID laws in multiple states. The nonpartisan voter rights group noted that the number of calls and texts it fielded from voters needing assistance to obtain ID to vote in 2023 elections skyrocketed by nearly 300% over requests received in 2021, the most recent similar election year. The organization said that in the week before November 7, 2023, as Americans in numerous states prepared to vote in elections that would decide high-stakes state ballot initiatives and gubernatorial and state house elections, VoteRiders experienced an uptick in urgent requests for voter ID assistance. The non-profit received almost 80% more requests for help than it received in 2021. Newsweek cited additional data from VoteRiders outlining the growing number of hurdles eligible voters must overcome to cast a ballot. For example, the number of Americans who live in a voter ID state increased by 52 million since 2012, and since 2020, 17 states passed new or more stringent voter ID requirements. Lauren Kunis, CEO and executive director of VoteRiders, told Newsweek that the rapid increase in requests for assistance signals an urgent need for voter education on ID requirements.

In Georgia, VoteRiders helped voters cure absentee ballot rejections by providing guidance on new ID requirements that varied by voting method. Their efforts supported voters whose ballots were initially rejected due to confusion over these changing rules. These actions were part of a broader push to ensure eligible votes were counted despite recent election law changes.

=== Impacted demographics ===
In the run-up to the 2018 election, VoteRiders was cited as a resource to help voters obtain ID in a Glamour magazine article about modern attempts to disenfranchise women and people of color.

A VoteRiders coordinator was quoted in an Essence article published on November 1, 2018, about the importance of ensuring that black women participate in the democratic process.

In the 2020 election, 35 states had voter ID laws. Some states require a current government-issued photo ID, while others' may accept a document such as a bank statement, paystub or utility bill showing the voter's name and address. VoteRiders founder Kathleen Unger noted that in many states "it's not enough to register to vote." She announced that VoteRiders is partnering with major law firms and other voter protection groups to provide assistance to voters who need information on the ID laws in their state and help them obtain the required ID.

Unger raised the alarm about the possibility that signature matching problems on mail-in ballots could become the "hanging chad of 2020" since more voters are expected to vote by mail due to the pandemic. She noted that older voters, younger voters and voters with disabilities may be especially vulnerable to having their ballots disqualified due to signature matching issues.

In an October 2022 article on obstacles trans people face due to voter ID laws and state rules governing trans identification, Rolling Stone cited VoteRiders as a resource that can help voters get the ID they need and respond to challenges from elections officials. VoteRiders was also cited as a voter ID resource for trans voters in an October 2022 article in The 19th and a trans voter guide published in November 2022 by Them.

The Robert Hubbell Newsletter highlighted that members of underrepresented racial and ethnic groups were less likely to have a current driver's license or other government-issued photo ID. Women, because of name changes associated with marriage and divorce, up to 37,000,000 voting-age women have proof-of-citizenship documents that do not reflect their legal name.

== Activities by state ==
VoteRiders informs and helps voters as well as partners with other national organizations in addition to state and local organizations in 36 states—Alabama, Arizona, Arkansas, California, Colorado, Connecticut, Florida, Georgia, Illinois, Indiana, Iowa, Kansas, Kentucky, Louisiana, Maryland, Massachusetts, Michigan, Minnesota, Mississippi, Missouri, Montana, Nevada, New Hampshire, New Jersey, New York, North Carolina, Ohio, Pennsylvania, South Carolina, Tennessee, Texas, Utah, Vermont, Virginia, West Virginia and Wisconsin as well as in District of Columbia.

Some of VoteRiders' on the ground efforts include:

=== Alabama ===
VoteRiders founder Kathleen Unger was quoted in an October 30, 2018, article in the Montgomery Advertiser on Alabama's photo ID law: "At this point, we see 25 million eligible voters nationally who do not have a current government issued photo ID, which is the primary type of ID that states require. We've discovered over time that many millions more eligible voters are so confused and intimidated by voter ID laws, which are complicated and onerous, that they won't vote, even though they have valid ID."

The article noted VoteRiders' work with local groups in Alabama, including Faith in Action, to educate voters and help them secure ID, quoting Unger again: "It is understandable that people would feel overwhelmed by the legalities of voter ID laws. The key reason for our existence is to make it easy. ... Our goal is for people to be fully prepared and fully confident."

In the weeks preceding the December 2017 Roy Moore–Doug Jones special election to the U.S. Senate in Alabama, VoteRiders actively assisted voters in obtaining the IDs that made them eligible to cast a ballot.

=== Arizona ===
VoteRiders' Arizona Voter ID Coalition coordinator, partnered with the Phoenix Indian Center to assist voters in making sure they had the proper ID needed to cast a ballot.

A 2022 article in the Arizona Mirror described the unique difficulties people in the state's disabled community face when trying to comply with the state's strict voter ID law. The article notes that VoteRiders partners with organizations that serve people living with disabilities and steps in when needed to help eligible voters obtain documentation so they can secure the proper ID and make their voices heard during elections.

=== Florida ===
After Hurricane Maria devastated Puerto Rico in 2017, the island experienced the largest out-migration in its history, and Florida was the top destination to resettle in the aftermath of the storm. In June 2018, VoteRiders began a campaign to assist resettled citizens who wished to cast a ballot in Florida, educating potential voters on what documents are required and helping them secure identification. In September, 2021, the League of Women Voters of Florida partnered with VoteRiders to ensure that Florida voters can acquire the documents needed to comply with new requirements introduced by Florida's Senate Bill 90 which was passed in May, 2021. In March 2022, First Coast News reported on a Jacksonville woman who got a ride and advice on how to get valid ID. This not only helps her register to vote, but in her case it helped her receive life-saving medical treatment.

=== Georgia ===
Georgia's "exact match" law resulted in widespread confusion about voter ID requirements and eligibility in the 2018 election. VoteRiders developed targeted digital and radio public service announcements to provide comprehensive and timely information. The public service announcements were widely shared on Facebook, including by celebrities such as Leonardo DiCaprio, who has 18 million followers on the social media platform. On January 2, 2021, and prior to Georgia's runoff elections, America Ferrera and Eva Longoria joined VoteRiders in a "textbanking" event to educate and assist Latina voters regarding the state's voter ID laws. Ryan Seacrest referenced VoteRiders on Twitter, reminding Georgia voters about the election and voter ID requirements. An interview with Kathleen Unger in the January 6, 2021 issue of Ms. focuses in detail on the far-reaching role of VoteRiders in the January 2021 senate run-off elections in Georgia

Georgia enacted changes to the state's voting laws in March 2021, including new voter ID requirements. With high turnout projected for the 2022 midterm elections and many registered voters unaware of the new rules, VoteRiders invested significant resources in Georgia to reach out to more than 150,000 voters who did not have a valid ID filed with the secretary of state.

Prior to the 2022 midterm elections, VoteRiders staff and volunteers in Georgia educated voters on the new requirements and provided assistance to voters who needed help obtaining IDs. The nonprofit also conducted student outreach at Historically Black Colleges and Universities (HBCUs) in Georgia. Many HBCU students attend private institutions like Spelman College, and private college student IDs alone are not sufficient to establish voter eligibility under Georgia law. VoteRiders provided information about other acceptable IDs to bring to polling places.

Some voters who had not voted in recent elections were also unclear on the new rules. One Georgia voter told Time magazine he did not know he needed an ID to vote until he received a postcard from VoteRiders. Since he was unemployed and lacked transportation, he faced a cost barrier to obtain an ID. VoteRiders stepped in to arrange transportation to the DMV and pay the fee so the voter could make his voice heard during the 2022 election.

=== North Carolina ===
In April 2022, voter ID requirements in North Carolina were in limbo, according to an article published by WCNC Charlotte. North Carolina courts had invalidated voter reform laws passed in 2018, but it was unclear in 2022 if new restrictions would be imposed for future elections, leading to confusion among voters in the state.

To celebrate the 10-year anniversary of its founding in April 2022, VoteRiders undertook voter education and assistance actions in North Carolina. Operatives on the ground helped people in the state understand the rules and obtain the documents needed to secure state ID so they could vote in future elections if new rules were adopted that required voter ID at the polls.

In April 2023, the Supreme Court of North Carolina reversed an earlier court ruling and reinstated photo ID requirements for voters, a decision that critics fear will have a disproportionate impact on disadvantaged communities. Starting with municipal primary and general elections in 2023, North Carolina voters are required to present a photo ID to vote in person. Those casting an absentee ballot by mail must provide a photocopy of an acceptable form of ID. Voters without photo ID must use a provision ballot.

VoteRiders has been a resource in the state for eligible voters who need assistance obtaining ID. The organization has assisted with gathering and paying for necessary documents and has arranged free transportation to the DMV.

For the first time since spring 2016, North Carolina voters need photo identification when they cast ballots in municipal elections this year. People who vote by mail will be asked to send a photocopy of their ID with their ballots. According to Pamela Pearson, the North Carolina coordinator for VoteRiders, Getting an ID can be tough if one cannot take time off to get to the DMV, do not have a way to get there, or cannot afford the fee to get a copy of a birth certificate, said Pearson. VoteRiders can help assemble the needed paperwork, cover costs for documents, and pay for Uber rides to the DMV, Pearson said. Rural elections offices do not have as many workers as offices in urban counties, and it takes longer for rural residents to get to DMV offices, creating a stark rural-urban divide when it comes to preparing for and implementing voter ID, according to Jean-Patrick Grillet, of Democracy NC. "It's a really bleak situation for rural voters, especially rural voters who are not drivers," Grillet said.

=== Ohio ===
Former Ohio Democratic Party Chairman, David Pepper whiteboards a crisis initiated by Ohio voter ID restrictions impacting 938,000 potential voters, disproportionately impacting young and minority populations. Proclaiming an attack on democracy, Pepper suggests partnering with VoteRiders to help affected Ohio citizens obtain the required voting identification.

Not only was Ohio's law more restrictive, it had not been widely publicized. "At this point, I'm not sure everyone understands that a lot has changed," according to Christine Corba, director of the Dayton League of Women Voters.

In March, Nazek Hapasha from the League of Women Voters criticized state lawmakers for approving strict new photo voter ID requirements without providing funding for boards to help educate voters. Because of the prohibitions passed in 2021 county boards cannot coordinate their efforts with outside groups like the League or VoteRiders.

Although the Ohio BMV issued free state ID cards to those eligible, applicants need specific documents to prove their identity. They could no longer use photocopies of a photo ID; other unacceptable proof includes military ID, utility bills, bank statements, government checks, or paychecks.

VoteRiders organized ID clinics across Ohio to communicate the new requirements and help people gather needed paperwork. VoteRiders also covered costs for ordering replacements for lost documents, and arrange transportation for those who need to order ID cards, according to Nick Ramos, interim voter ID coalition coordinator. VoteRiders helped voters request and send off an absentee ballot. Ohioans could call or text VoteRiders helpline.

In September 2023, a Dayton Daily News investigation found that more votes were rejected in Ohio counties in the wake of the passage of the new voter ID law. The following month, the newspaper published a feature story on VoteRiders' efforts to assist Miami Valley Ohioans with obtaining the documentation needed to get an ID and arranging free transportation to state agencies where IDs are issued. In the article, the Ohio coalition coordinator for VoteRiders noted that the new ID law disproportionately affects "Black and Hispanic voters, young Ohioans and college students."

As Ohio voters weighed in on ballot initiatives to protect access to reproductive healthcare services and legalize marijuana, the League of Women Voters reported that many college students in Ohio said they did not receive mail-in-ballots. A League spokeswoman noted that stringent new voter ID requirements made casting a ballot "a hassle" for students, many of whom lack the state ID now required. The VoteRiders coalition coordinator in the state amplified that concern, noting that many out-of-state students may have been left without a way to provide the required ID.

=== Pennsylvania ===
As noted in CBS News coverage of 2022 National Voter Registration Day activities in Philadelphia, VoterRiders worked with the local NAACP chapter to hold weekly voter ID clinics to encourage registration. During the clinics, VoteRiders representatives were on hand to help eligible voters who lacked ID secure the documentation they would need to register.

=== Texas ===
In response to a 2012 Justice Department report that some 1.4 million Texans would be affected by the Texas Voter ID Law, VoteRiders hosted its first Voter ID Clinic in Houston on September 21, 2013, and in May 2014, the organization hired a coordinator to work with local groups on voter ID initiatives. VoteRiders also reached out to elected officials on the federal, state and local levels in Harris County and contacted precinct chairs for both the Republican and Democratic parties. Tables with information on the new law were set up at church services and other public gatherings.

Partner organizations hosted presentations to explain the new law to the public. Volunteers were trained for voter outreach. It was a first step toward VoteRiders' ultimate goal: a nationwide network of partner organizations and volunteers dedicated to helping eligible citizens get the documents they need to vote.

VoteRiders' partner Mi Familia Vota Texas distributed wallet-sized VoteRiders' Texas Voter ID Information Cards as part of their canvassing effort in six majority Latino precincts in Houston for the November 2016 election. While overall Houston/Harris County voter turnout decreased by 1% (compared with the 2012 presidential election), turnout in these six precincts increased cumulatively by 92% and by an average of almost 9%; and in 2018, turnout in the 13 precincts where Mi Familia Vota Texas distributed VoteRiders' Voter ID Information Cards increased by an average of 435% (compared to 2014).

VoteRiders has a direct mailing outreach campaign in Texas to provide information for obtaining state-issued IDs. VoteRiders has identified seniors who no longer drive, students, and people of color as populations impacted by new voter ID requirements. They are also contacting 25,000 Texas voters whose ballots were rejected in the March 2022 primary. Texas is one of seven key states that have enacted stricter voter ID rules since the 2020 elections.

=== Virginia ===
Virginia's 2023 election will determine control of the House of Delegates and Senate, with every seat in the General Assembly on the line. There is heightened interest in the election because parties have narrow majorities in the chambers and analysts believe the race may have implications for the 2024 elections. VoteRiders CEO Lauren Kunis told a Virginia reporter that "the stakes are too high to sit any election out" and described how VoteRiders can help Virginia voters who are looking for information on voting rights and assistance with obtaining an ID.

=== Wisconsin ===
VoteRiders has participated in on-the-ground voter ID requirement awareness and outreach campaigns in Wisconsin since 2015, forming coalitions with local leaders and engaging in education efforts via regional media. An interview with Milwaukee's alternative weekly newspaper, Shepherd Express, highlighted VoteRiders' role as the source of wallet-sized Voter ID Information Cards and voter ID clinic resources. A VoteRiders statewide coordinator was featured in a video produced by NowThis Politics, which has more than 10 million Facebook followers. In 2016, VoteRiders went with voters to DMV's in Wisconsin to understand and advocate for changes in how long it would take to get a photo ID in order to vote without having your birth certificate. They found inconsistent processes across the state.

VoteRiders was featured in a 2018 investigative piece about how Wisconsin voter ID laws posed challenges to the young, the elderly and people of color; the article stated that the organization's services include "arranging transportation to local Division of Motor Vehicle offices, free legal assistance in obtaining proper documentation, and covering the costs of documents required for registering to vote such as birth certificates and Social Security cards."

It is estimated that approximately 600,000 (18%) of registered Wisconsin voters in 2016 were negatively impacted by the state's newly enforced voter ID law. This number includes more than 300,000 registered voters who did not have an acceptable voter photo ID and an additional 300,000 voters who were confused and intimidated by the state's voter ID law even though they did have the correct ID. This reality motivated VoteRiders to lead the nation's first ever "Voter ID Month," which took place in Wisconsin in March 2016.

VoteRiders' efforts in Wisconsin were spearheaded by national and state coordinators, including Anita Johnson, Wisconsin Statewide Coordinator, who worked with the organization's partners, such as the Dane County Voter ID Coalition. Reporting directly to VoteRiders founder Kathleen Unger, these coordinators' efforts included training volunteers, including throughout Dane County, interacting with thousands of voters to make sure they had valid ID and, if not, helping them obtain documents to get voter ID, and arranging transportation to the DMV, oftentimes with a member of VoteRiders' team to assist.

Activities were focused especially on low-income and transient voters (including young professionals) by way of events and presentations with voters at churches, colleges, high schools, libraries, homeless shelters, food pantries, job centers, education centers, apartment buildings and corporations, etc., in downtown Madison and throughout the county. Examples include phone banks, the University of Wisconsin–Madison (with 14,000 out-of-state students), "Get It Free with Your Voter ID" pizza parties, and T-shirts with "Ask Me" (front) and "About Voter ID" (back).

On March 2, 2016, VoteRiders' team was responsible for organizing a press conference at the capitol that resulted in significant media attention, including coverage by all TV network affiliates. VoteRiders played a pivotal role in the Wisconsin legislature's and governor's decision to expand approved voter IDs to include a Veterans Affairs card. Based on the results of Voter ID Month, VoteRiders created toolkits for distribution to other communities in Wisconsin and across the country.

In 2020, VoteRiders became involved with Wisconsin and other states, working to measure and address the impact of COVID-19 on voter turnout for the 2020 US presidential election. Anita Johnson, Wisconsin Voter ID Coalition Coordinator at VoteRiders, was quoted in a Los Angeles Times report on the hurdles Black voters face: "It's sad that we should have to jump through hoops just to go exercise our right to vote."

For the 2023 Wisconsin Supreme Court election, VoteRiders co-hosted the "Wisconsin Supreme Court Candidate Spring Forum" on March 28, 2023, in collaboration with All Voting is Local and the Campus Vote Project.

== Partner organizations and individual supporters ==
A 2024 Time Magazine article reported that VoteRiders had collaborated with approximately 2,000 partner organizations.

In 2023, the Rockefeller Foundation published an article about VoteRiders "Building a Resilient Democracy, One Identity Card at a Time." They quote Reverend Dr. Monica Spencer: "It is extremely important to keep working in years when the ballot boxes aren't open," she said. "If we don't plant the seeds, we won't get a crop."

=== Corporate philanthropy ===
- VoteRiders partnered with Facebook to integrate state-by-state guidance on voter ID laws into Facebook's Voting Information Center. This allows users nationwide to access ID requirements as they create their voting plans.
- VoteRiders partnered with Lyft and Uber in several states to provide people discounted rideshare transportation to driver's license facilities to apply for state IDs regardless of party affiliation.
- In June 2020, Magnolia Pictures and Participant media company announced the release of a documentary: John Lewis: Good Trouble. The film celebrates the legacy of Georgia congressman and civil rights leader John Lewis. To coincide with the documentary's release, Participant announced a Good Trouble impact campaign to provide support for disenfranchised communities and raise awareness of voting rights. VoteRiders partnered with other organizations to support the campaign and organized a virtual screening in August 2020. In a comment for a BET.com article on the film and campaign, VoteRiders COO Shannon Anderson said, "VoteRiders' mission is inspired by John Lewis' lifelong commitment to our democracy and our fundamental right to vote."
- In 2022, VoteRiders partnered with Snapchat to provide Snapchat users with new voter registration and awareness tools.

=== Individual supporters ===
Leaders, television personalities, entertainers, actors, athletes, writers, and influencers have supported and promoted VoteRiders efforts, including Elizabeth Banks, Jack Black, Jordana Brewster, Krystal Joy Brown, Yvette Nicole Brown, Gavin Creel, Miley Cyrus, Leonardo DiCaprio, America Ferrera, Josh Gad, Amber Heard, Ed Helms, David Hull, Nikki M. James, Celia Keenan-Bolger, Nick Kroll, Katrina Lenk, Eva Longoria, Meghan Markle (Meghan, Duchess of Sussex), Audra McDonald, Monica, Michelle Obama, Rory O'Malley, Piper Perabo, Michael Potts, Andrew Rannells, Mark Ruffalo, Zoe Saldaña, Amy Schumer, Sarah Silverman, Barbra Streisand, Will Swenson, Gabrielle Union, Joyce Vance, Kerry Washington, Trisha Yearwood, the cast of Hamilton (Ham4Progress), and the PoliticsGirl Podcast.

- In September 2020, VoteRiders partnered with numerous celebrities including Zoe Saldaña, Amy Schumer, Elizabeth Banks, Rory O'Malley, and Amber Heard for the #IDCheck challenge to help spread the word to voters about what would be required of them to vote in the upcoming election.
- Shortly before Election Day 2020, media outlet Complex published a voter ID guide for each state that highlighted social media outreach from Democracy Docket and actor/comedian Amy Schumer urging voters who need help with ID to contact VoteRiders.

== Reception ==
VoteRiders has been profiled in local and alternative media in connection with voter ID issues.

Its work on advocacy and legal aid has been described by Professor Carol Anderson, author of One Person, No Vote: How Voter Suppression Is Destroying Our Democracy, as one that "makes the difference in whether thousands of people get to vote or are disenfranchised." Professor Anderson was interviewed on "The Daily Show" on October 1, 2018, and on KQED's Forum on October 23, 2018, where she discussed modern-day voter suppression and mentioned VoteRiders as a resource for people who need voter ID.

Joshua Douglas has called VoteRiders "one of the most important democracy groups you've probably never heard of."

Miami Herald columnist Leonard Pitts Jr. quoted Professor Carol Anderson in a November 8, 2019 column on voter suppression: "Support civil-society organizations that are doing so much to help folks get registered to vote and get out the vote. I mean folks like Indivisible (indivisible.org), the NAACP Legal Defense Fund (naacpldf.org), the ACLU (aclu.org), VoteRiders (voteriders.org). Those are the folks doing some heavy lifting fighting for this democracy..."

The New York Times referenced VoteRiders as a source of information on voter ID requirements in a November 6, 2018 article about questions voters may have about voting in the midterm elections.

VoteRiders received the Candid Platinum Seal of Transparency (formerly GuideStar) in 2021, its highest level of transparency.

== See also ==
- HeadCount
- Vote.org
- VOTE411.org
