= Oliver A. Unger =

American film producer

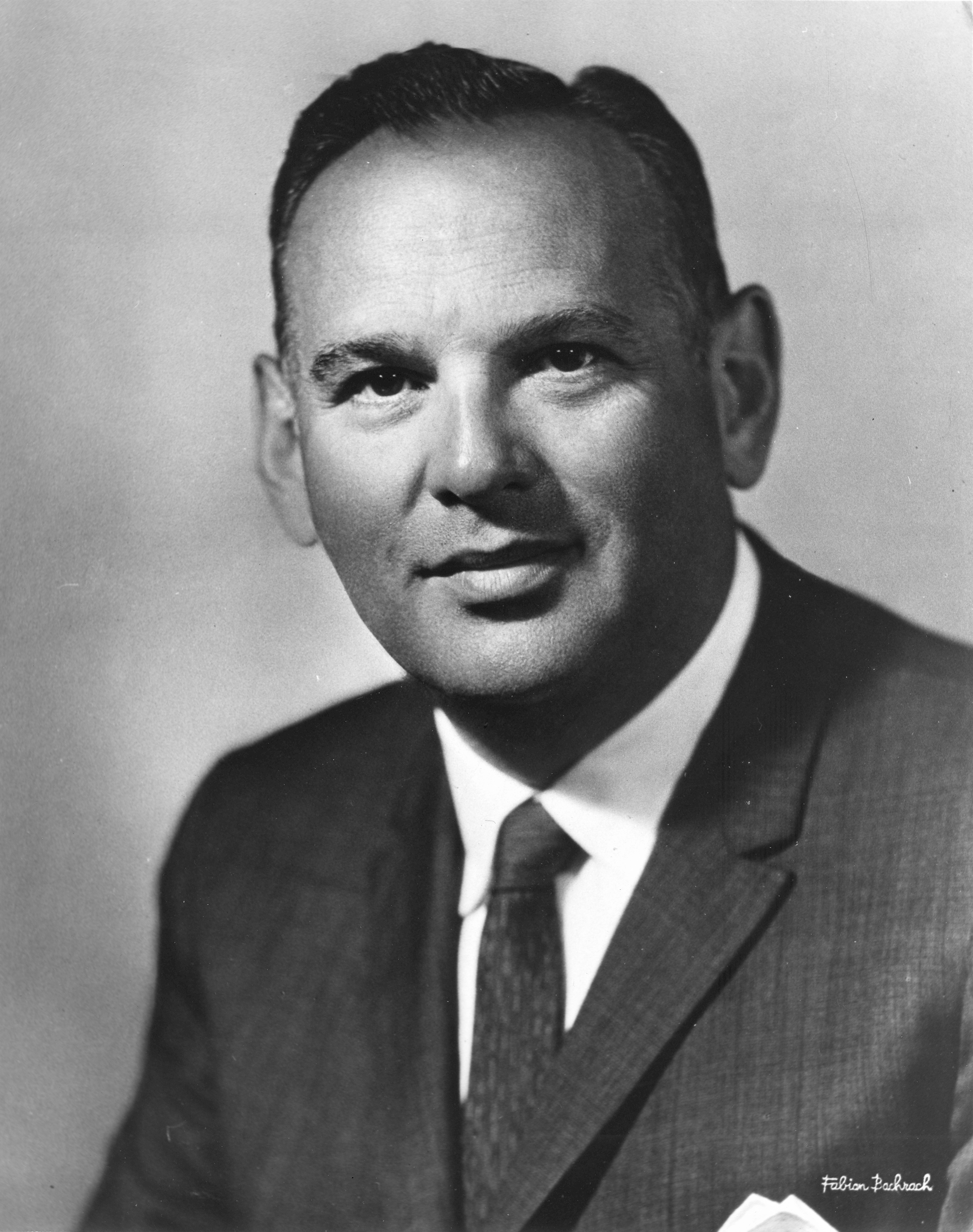
- Unger in c. 1959
- Born: August 28, 1914; Chicago, Illinois, U.S.
- Died: March 27, 1981 (aged 66); Beverly Hills, California, U.S.
- Occupations: Film producer, television producer, film distributor
- Notable work: Force 10 from Navarone; Battle of Neretva; Face of Fu Manchu; Mozambique
- Spouse: Virginia Sonnenfeld (m. 1939)
- Relatives: Anthony B. Unger (son); Stephen A. Unger (son); David A. Unger (grandson)

Oliver A. Unger (August 28, 1914 – March 27, 1981) was an American film producer, distributor, and exhibitor. In a 45-year career, he was also a television producer and owner of movie theaters and television stations throughout the United States.

== Personal ==
Unger was born in Chicago, of Hungarian descent. His family also lived in New York before moving back in 1920 to the Hungarian capital, Budapest, where his father, Bertram Unger, was a bank president. They returned to New York City in 1926 and Unger attended Columbia Grammar School until his graduation in 1931. Unger earned a Bachelor of Arts degree from Syracuse University in 1935.

Unger was organizing Celebration 33 — a benefit commemorating the thirty-third anniversary of the State of Israel — when he died at the age of 66. He was survived by his wife, Virginia; two sons, Anthony B. Unger and Stephen A. Unger; three daughters: Meryl L. Unger, Dr. Olivia A. Raynor and Victoria R.S. Unger; and a grandson, David A. Unger.

In 1984 the Unger family donated Oliver Unger's collection of personal documents and film production files to the University of Wyoming's American Heritage Center.

== Career ==
=== Film ===
From 1937 to 1945 Unger worked for J.H. Hoffberg Co. Inc., after 1940 renamed Hoffberg Productions Inc., eventually serving as Vice President. During this period, he was involved with importing and distributing foreign films. He was one of the first businessmen to travel to Europe after World War II, where he purchased foreign films for distribution in the United States. It was during this time that he founded Distinguished Films and Tola Productions with Martin Levine. They produced The Roosevelt Story, an 80-minute documentary about President Franklin D. Roosevelt, filmed under the supervision of Elliott Roosevelt. The Roosevelt Story was awarded the Peace Prize at the 1948 Brussels Film Festival and regarded as "the most popular compilation film of the later 1940s".

In the 1950s, he formed a brief partnership with Budd Rogers in the distribution firm of Rogers & Unger Inc. In 1961, Unger and Ely Landau formed the Landau-Unger Company, which produced films such as Long Day's Journey into Night (1962) and The Pawnbroker (1964). Unger presented the former at the 1962 Cannes Film Festival, where its stars (Katharine Hepburn, Ralph Richardson, Jason Robards and Dean Stockwell) won the Best Actress and Actor awards collectively. The Landau-Unger Company also distributed The Eleanor Roosevelt Story, which won the 1965 Academy Award for Best Documentary. Unger produced several films in Southern Africa with Harry Alan Towers in the 1960s.

The Landau-Unger Company was sold to Commonwealth United Corporation in 1967, at which time Unger was named Vice Chairman of Commonwealth United Company. In 1969 he added the titles of Vice Chairman of Commonwealth United Corporation and Chief Executive Officer of Commonwealth's Entertainment Division. Films financed, produced and distributed by Commonwealth United under Unger's tutelage include The Madwoman of Chaillot, The Magic Christian, Julius Caesar and Battle of Neretva.

In the early 1970s, Unger acquired the U.S. marketing rights for a number of Charlie Chaplin's films, including City Lights and Modern Times. Soon thereafter, Unger formed Marwi Capital Development N.V. in Paris, whose principal activity was to produce Assassination at Sarajevo also released as The Day That Shook the World (starring Christopher Plummer, Maximilian Schell, and Florinda Bolkan) and Force 10 from Navarone (starring Harrison Ford, Robert Shaw, Carl Weathers and Barbara Bach).

Additionally, over a 20-year period Unger owned and operated (with partners) a number of movie theaters in Manhattan and The Bronx, among them The Tudor Theatre, The Lido, The Studio, The Little Carnegie, The Cinema Rendezvous and The Fine Arts.

=== Television ===
In the early 1950s, Unger worked as Vice President of Snader Telescription Sales and headed Station Distributors, "one of the country's first television syndication outfits."

Unger co-founded National Telefilm Associates with Ely Landau and Harold Goldman in 1954, where he served in various capacities and rose eventually to Chairman and President before leaving in 1961. Among the NTA's assets were American television stations including Channel 13 in Newark, N.J. WNTA-TV (now WNET), whose programming included award-winning shows such as The Play of the Week, Open End (hosted by David Susskind) and The Mike Wallace Interview.

In November 1962, Unger formed a partnership with Bill Sargent and Joe Louis to promote Cassius Clay's (later Muhammad Ali) first closed-circuit fight against Archie Moore in Los Angeles. A year later, after he was approached by Roy Wilkins and Thurgood Marshall (then President and Executive Director of the NAACP, respectively), Unger formed Freedom Network, Inc. to produce and promote Freedom Spectacular, a charity event commemorating the tenth anniversary of Brown v. Board of Education. The all-star production, screened live in movie theaters and other venues, included Harry Belafonte, Nat King Cole, Bill Cosby, Ossie Davis and Ruby Dee, Sammy Davis Jr., Lena Horne, Sidney Poitier, Tony Bennett, Richard Burton and Elizabeth Taylor, Gene Kelly, Burt Lancaster and many others.

In 1972, Unger and Peter Gettinger formed Hotel Films International, the first venture in Europe that made films available in hotel rooms via closed-circuit television. They sold the company to a Swiss/Arab interest in 1975.

=== Medal of Honor ===
In 1978, at a special investiture ceremony "in recognition of his services in promoting US/Yugoslavian cultural and trade relations," Unger was bestowed a "Medal of Honor" and designated an "Honored Artist" by President Tito for films that he either produced or co-produced in Yugoslavia: Battle of Neretva (Bitka na Neretvi, nominated for Best Foreign Film at the 42nd Academy Awards in April 1970), The Day That Shook the World (Atentat u Sarajevu, 1975) and Force 10 from Navarone (1978).

== Filmography ==
As Producer (partial list)

- The Roosevelt Story (1947)
- Coast of Skeletons (1964)
- Mozambique (1964)
- Face of Fu Manchu (1965)
- Ten Little Indians (1965)
- A Face of War (1968)
- Sandy the Seal (1969)
- Force 10 from Navarone (1978)

As Executive Producer, Presenter, Distributor, Other (partial list)

- City Lights (1931)
- Modern Times (1936)
- Long Day's Journey into Night (1962)
- The Pawnbroker (1964)
- The Umbrellas of Cherbourg (1964)
- Eleanor Roosevelt Story (1965)
- Our Man in Marrakesh (1966)
- Battle of Neretva (1969)
- The Madwoman of Chaillot (1969)
- King: A Filmed Record... Montgomery to Memphis (1970)
- I Love You Rosa (1972)
- The Day That Shook the World (1975)
