= Queensferry =

Queensferry may refer to several places:

- North Queensferry, Fife, Scotland
- South Queensferry, Edinburgh, Scotland
- Queensferry (Parliament of Scotland constituency)
- Queensferry, Flintshire, Wales
- Queensferry, Victoria, Australia

== See also ==
- Queensferry Crossing, a road bridge over the Firth of Forth
