= Anthony B. Unger =

American film producer

- Born: October 19, 1940; Manhattan, New York, U.S.
- Education: University of Southern California
- Occupation: Film producer
- Notable work: Silent Rage; Force 10 from Navarone; Don't Look Now; The Magic Christian; Battle of Neretva
- Spouse: Joelle Allain Smadja (m. 1965)
- Children: David A. Unger
- Relatives: Oliver A. Unger (father); Stephen A. Unger (brother)

Anthony B. Unger (born October 19, 1940) is an American film producer whose 40-year international career includes such titles as Nicolas Roeg's 1973 thriller Don't Look Now as well 1969's Battle of Neretva, The Madwoman of Chaillot, The Magic Christian and The Promise. His 1970 credits include the first color production of Shakespeare's Julius Caesar and the Ava Gardner vehicle Tam Lin. In the 1980s he produced The Unseen and Chuck Norris' Silent Rage.

== Early life ==
Born in Manhattan, Anthony Unger, also known as Tony, is the son of award-winning film and television producer, distributor and exhibitor Oliver A. Unger. Graduating from the Bronx High School of Science at the age of 16, he attended Duke University from 1957 until December 1959 when the Unger family, including his three sisters and younger brother Stephen A. Unger, moved to Southern California, settling in Beverly Hills. Transferring to the University of Southern California, he graduated from the USC School of Business in 1961.

== Career ==
=== 1960s ===
Unger started out in his early twenties as a television production assistant and coordinator. In 1964 he served as a production coordinator for the May 14 closed circuit broadcast of the Freedom Network, Inc. two-hour Freedom Spectacular, commemorating the 1954 Supreme Court school desegregation ruling. The all-star production, screened live in movie theaters and other venues, included Harry Belafonte, Nat King Cole, Bill Cosby, Ossie Davis and Ruby Dee, Sammy Davis Jr., Lena Horne, Sidney Poitier, Tony Bennett, Richard Burton and Elizabeth Taylor, Gene Kelly, Burt Lancaster and many others.

He then worked as assistant director on such international co-productions as 1965's 24 Hours to Kill, filmed in the Lebanese capital Beirut, and The Face of Fu Manchu, filmed in Ireland.

By 1967 Unger was serving as associate producer on The Desperate Ones, filmed in Madrid and other Spanish locations and, two years later, rose to executive producer on the Yugoslavia-based World War II international epic Battle of Neretva, which ultimately became one of the five nominees for Best Foreign Language Film at the 42nd Academy Awards in April 1970.

He continued to serve as executive producer for a number of other European-based productions — 1969's The Madwoman of Chaillot, filmed in Paris and various locations around France, The Magic Christian, with Peter Sellers, Ringo Starr and an all-star cast, including theme song written by Paul McCartney, filmed in London and numerous locations around England, and The Promise, also filmed in England.

=== 1970s ===
The following year, 1970, was also spent filming in Europe — Julius Caesar, with Charlton Heston as Mark Antony, Jason Robards as Brutus and another all-star cast, shot on location in England and Spain, as well as Tam Lin, directed by Roddy McDowall, another feature filmed in Scotland and England.

In 1971, while living in Spain, Tony Unger along with his brother Stephen and two friends, co-founded, built, owned and operated Foster's Hollywood — Spain's first American-food / Hollywood-themed restaurants. He and his partners sold the restaurant chain in 1976. By 2009, Foster's Hollywood grew to become the 11th largest franchise restaurant chain in Europe with over 140 restaurants in Spain. From 1972 to 1976, while maintaining his position with Foster's Hollywood, Unger also served as co-managing director of Ernest W. Hahn Mercantil, the international arm of The Hahn Company, one of the world's largest developers of shopping centers.

Continuing to work on European locations, he served as the executive producer on the critically praised 1973 psychic thriller, Don't Look Now, based on the story by Daphne du Maurier and filmed primarily in Venice, with a small minority of scenes done in England. In 2011, a poll for Time Out ranked it the best British film ever.

Five years later, in 1978, Tony Unger worked as a co-producer on another World War II epic, Force 10 from Navarone, with his father, Oliver Unger, who produced the film primarily on Yugoslav locations, but also in Malta, England and the Channel Island of Jersey. In 1979, having bought the rights to Jimmy Dean's hit song, "Big Bad John", he and musician-screenwriter Gordon Whitey Mitchell, who turned the song's plot into a vehicle for Arnold Schwarzenegger, met with Schwarzenegger and his wife Maria Shriver at their home. Schwarzenegger happily agreed to play the title role, however, in the late 1970s, no studio executive had confidence in the bodybuilder's potential as a film star and the project went unrealized.

=== Later years ===
In 1981, Unger served as producer of the horror thriller The Unseen as well as the Chuck Norris vehicle Silent Rage and, in 1984, he and his brother Stephen founded The Unger Co. Based in Hollywood, the corporation was conceived as "a cross fertilization of producing, distributing and co-financing motion pictures and television product". Its most successful activities were in overseas distribution of major studio American films on behalf of such clients as Procines S.A. in Spain, Parkfilm S.A. in Switzerland, Conate S.A. in Chile and Rediffusion Swiss Cable. Some of the motion pictures acquired by the corporation on behalf of its territorial distributors included Amadeus, Cabaret, The Chosen, Intermezzo, Notorious, The Outsiders, Spellbound and They Shoot Horses, Don't They?.

In 1998, a 54-minute documentary, The Dark Side of Hollywood, which focused upon the career hopes and business maneuvers of low-budget filmmakers and the actors who appear in their films, credited three producers, including Anthony B. Unger and, in 2001, one such film, Tart, included in its credits "Special thanks to Tony Unger".

== Personal life ==
Tony Unger has been married to Paris native Joelle Allain Smadja since 1965. Their son is leading entertainment industry talent manager David A. Unger.

== Filmography ==
- The Desperate Ones (1967) – associate producer
- Battle of Neretva (1969) – executive producer
- The Madwoman of Chaillot (1969) – producer
- The Magic Christian (1969) – executive producer
- The Promise (1969) – executive producer
- Julius Caesar (1970) – executive producer
- Tam Lin (1970) – executive producer
- Don't Look Now (1973) – executive producer
- Force 10 from Navarone (1978) – co-producer
- The Unseen (1980) – producer
- Silent Rage (1982) – producer
- The Dark Side of Hollywood (1998) – producer
