= Ungaro =

Ungaro is a surname, meaning 'of Hungarian descent/origin'. Notable people with the surname include:

- Amanda Ungaro (born 1984), Brazilian model and Epstein affair figure
- Emanuel Ungaro (1933–2019), French fashion designer
- Gaetano Ungaro (born 1987), Italian football player
- Joseph M. Ungaro (1930–2006), American journalist
- Luigi Ungaro (born 1954)
- Malatesta Ungaro (born Galeotto Malatesta; 1327–1372), Italian condottiero and lord of Jesi
- Massimo Ungaro (born 1987)
- Michele Ungaro (1819–1890)
- Patrick J. Ungaro (1941–2019), American politician
- Ursula Mancusi Ungaro (born 1951), American lawyer and judge

== See also ==
- Ungari
- Ungaretti
- Ongaro
- Ongarato
- Ungar
- Unger
- Ungerer
- Ungermann, Ungerman
- Ungur
- Ungureanu
- Vengerov, Węgierski, Ugorski
- Name of Hungary
