= Ungur =

Ungur is a Romanian surname, meaning ”Hungarian” in the Romanian language. Notable people with the surname include:

- Adrian Ungur (born 1971), Romanian football player
- Adrian Ungur (born 1985), Romanian tennis player
- Liana Ungur (born 1985), Romanian tennis player

== See also ==
- Ungureanu
- Ungar
- Ungaro
- Ungaretti
- Unger
- Ungerman, Ungermann
- Vengerov
