= Timeline of the Gaza war (28 October 2023 – 23 November 2023) =

- Initial attacks; (7–27 October 2023); Invasion of the Gaza Strip; (28 October 2023 – 23 November 2023); First ceasefire; (24 November 2023 – 11 January 2024); Yemen airstrikes; (12 January 2024 – 6 May 2024); Rafah offensive; (7 May 2024 – 12 July 2024); Al-Mawasi attack; (13 July 2024 – 26 September 2024); Attack on Hezbollah headquarters; (27 September 2024 – 16 October 2024); Killing of Yahya Sinwar; (17 October 2024 – 26 November 2024); Israel–Lebanon ceasefire agreement; (27 November 2024 – 18 January 2025); Israel–Hamas ceasefire agreement; (19 January 2025 – 17 March 2025); March 2025 Israeli attacks on the Gaza Strip; (18 March 2025 – 15 May 2025); May 2025 Gaza offensive; (16 May 2025 – 19 August 2025); August 2025 Gaza offensive; (20 August 2025 – 2 October 2025); October 2025 Israel–Hamas ceasefire agreement; (3 October 2025 – present)

== October 2023 ==
=== 28 October ===
- Israel began an invasion of the Gaza Strip, launching a large-scale ground assault on the towns of Beit Hanoun and Bureij.
- A Rocket fired by Hamas hit a residential building in Israel's Kiryat Ono.
- A Rocket fired from Gaza hit an apartment building in Israel's Or Yehuda.

=== 29 October ===
- Israeli munitions hit a location next to al-Quds hospital.
- (Dr.) Ghassan Abu Sitta wrote that he was increasingly treating patients with "distinctive phosphorus burns."
- Three rockets were fired from Lebanon towards towns in Israel's Upper Galilee.

=== 30 October ===
- The Turkish-Palestinian Friendship Hospital was struck by the IAF.
- WHO announced it could no longer resupply al-Shifa and al-Quds hospitals due to the high levels of risk.
- The al-Qassam brigades fired a "Mutabar" missile at an Israeli drone near Khan Yunis.
- The Syrian Army fired rockets towards Israel.
- Israel attacked the immediate surroundings of the Indonesian Hospital in Beit Lahia.
- A Rocket was fired towards Israel's Sderot

=== 31 October ===
- Engineer's Building airstrike – Israel launches an airstrike on an apartment building that kills 106 people.
- The Houthis launched a number of ballistic missiles and drones towards Israel and warned of more attacks to come. The IDF said that it had destroyed a number of drones over the Red Sea using its new Arrow aerial defense system for the first time.
- The Al-Quds Brigades and the Al-Aqsa Martyrs' Brigades conducted their first combined attack on the IDF in the West Bank since 19 October.
- The Abu Ali Mustafa Brigades launched mortars into southern Israel.
- Israel said that in its airstrike in the Jabalia refugee camp, it killed a top Hamas militant that directed Nukhba teams that attacked Israel on October 7. It added that his tunnel collapsed, causing adjacent buildings to collapse as well.
- The IDF said that a surface-to-air missile that was launched from Lebanon at an IDF drone was downed, and that the IAF carried out a retaliatory strike on the launch site and the militants that fired it.
- Romania confirmed that Hamas holds 3 Romanian citizens as hostages in the Gaza strip.
- The IDF said that it took over a Hamas stronghold in northern Gaza Strip, killing 50 militants, destroying tunnels, rocket launching positions, and weapon storage facilities.
- Egypt deployed dozens of tanks near its border crossing to the Gaza Strip, fearing thousands of Gazans will enter its territory.

== November 2023 ==
=== 1 November ===
- The Lions' Den called for all Palestinians to confront Israel.
- An Israeli armored unit was spotted west of Al-Mughraqa.
- IAF strikes in Jabalia refugee camp in the Gaza Strip, leading to multiple casualties.
- The director of the Turkish-Palestinian Friendship Hospital stated Gaza's only cancer hospital was "completely out of service" after it ran out of fuel to power its generator.

=== 2 November ===
- The siege of Gaza City started.
- The IAF struck in the surroundings of the Al-Quds hospital in Gaza.
- The Al-Quds Brigades claimed an IED and small arms attack on IDF forces in Jaba', Jenin.
- An IDF reservist was attacked and killed in his car near Beit Lid in the West Bank by gunmen.
- The Islamic Resistance in Iraq claimed an attack on a target on the Dead Sea coastline of Israel. This was the first attack on Israel from Iraqi territory in the war.
- Salman Habaka, An Israeli Lieutenant Colonel, Is killed during the fighting in Beit Hanoun

=== 3 November ===
- The IAF attacked an ambulance column and the main gates of the Al-Shifa hospital.
- The Al-Qassam brigades attacked IDF forces while the Al-Quds brigades provided artillery support northwest of Gaza, and conducted anti-tank attacks on IDF positions in Beit Lahia and Beit Hanoun. It also fired rockets at Tel Aviv.
- Clashes were reported in the Zeitoun and Shuja'iyya neighborhoods of Gaza.
- The DFLP fired mortars at Sufa while Al-Quds brigades fired rockets at IDF positions along the Israeli-Gaza border.
- The Al-Aqsa Martyrs' Brigades' Tulkarm Battalion claimed IED attacks against Israeli forces in four locations in Tulkarm in the West Bank.
- Palestinian militants clashed with Israeli forces amid Israeli arrest raids in Jenin refugee camp.
- The Islamic Resistance in Iraq claimed responsibility for a missile attack on Eilat, Israel.
- A bakery that was destroyed by an Israeli air strike along with other buildings at Nuseirat refugee camp in Gaza. The bakery was reportedly serving thousands at the refugee camp.
- TRT reported that 11 Palestinians were killed in the West Bank.
- The Ministry of Health in Gaza said that Israel launched an airstrike at the Osama bin Zaid school which killed 20 people.
- Palestinian authorities said that Israel deported thousands of Gazan temporary workers back to the Gaza Strip, with an unknown number remaining in detention.
- Al Jazeera reported that Al-Quds and Indonesia Hospital were both hit by airstrikes.
- The BBC World Service launched an emergency radio service for the Gaza Strip.
- The Ministry stated 800 critically wounded patients needed to leave Gaza to receive care, stating many critically wounded patients had died in the past several days due to the collapsed healthcare system.
- A medical convoy in front of al-Shifa hospital was hit by an Israeli drone missile.

=== 4 November ===
- Several schools in Gaza were hit by Israeli airstrikes, including Al-Fakhoora.
- Several Palestinian groups called for a total popular mobilization against Israel.
- The Al-Quds Brigades launched an Ababil drone targeting an Israeli command center southeast of Zeitoun.
- The Al-Qassam brigades fired an Ayyash 250 rocket at Eilat, and attempted to infiltrate Zikim beach.
- The IDF launched an airstrike at the al-Maghazi refugee camp in the central Gaza Strip, killing at least 40 civilians.
- The Jordanian air force air-dropped medical supplies to hospitals across the Gaza Strip.
- The entrance of the al-Nasser Children's Hospital was hit by an Israeli strike.

=== 5 November ===
- The Al-Qassam brigades claimed to have destroyed IDF tanks in Beit Hanoun.
- Local sources claimed Hamas militants ambushed IDF units in the western outskirts of Netzarim.
- The Al-Qassam brigades launched two waves of rockets at Tel Aviv while the Al-Quds brigades launched rockets at 11 towns in the immediate vicinity of the Gaza strip.
- Israeli security forces killed an Islamic State operative in a raid in Abu Dis.
- US Secretary of State Antony Blinken met with Palestinian President Mahmoud Abbas in Ramallah to discuss a "post Hamas-Gaza" and humanitarian aid.
- Two Israeli police officers were injured in a stabbing attack in occupied East Jerusalem. The attacker, a 16-year old Palestinian male, was shot dead by Israeli forces.
- An unspecified US Navy nuclear Ohio-Class cruise missile submarine arrived in CENTCOM's area of responsibility via the Suez Canal.

=== 6 November ===
- An IDF spokesperson claimed that Israeli forces were slowly closing in on Gaza City.
- Israeli ground forces advanced towards the Indonesian Sheikh Hamad Hospital.
- The Al-Qassam brigades claimed it destroyed IDF tanks south of Tel al-Hawa and attacked Israeli forces advancing inland from the Gazan coast. It also launched two waves of rockets at Tel Aviv for the second consecutive day and launched rockets at Reim military base in the Southern District.
- Palestinian militants in the West Bank engaged Israeli security forces in 12 small arms clashes.
- Israel strike hit al-Shifa hospital's solar panels.

=== 7 November ===
- The al-Aqsa Martyrs' Brigade and the al-Quds Brigade engaged the IDF in an hours-long small arms clash and detonated IEDs in the Tulkarm Camp in the West Bank.
- Eight attacks were launched at Israel, five of which targeted military facilities.
- A record-breaking $1-billion in Israel Bonds were bought in the United States since the start of the war.

=== 8 November ===
- Hamas forces north of Gaza City conducted hit-and-run attacks on Israeli forces as part of a possible screening operation for a main defensive effort in central Gaza city.
- Hamas and PIJ fighters near al-Sulatain and al-Taom streets fired anti-tank rockets and mortars at Israeli forces in at least eight hit-and-run attacks.
- Fatah organized a demonstration in Ramallah to denounce Israeli attacks in the Gaza Strip.
- The Khaled bin al Waleed Mosque was completely destroyed by Israeli shelling in Khan Yunis.
- A US MQ-9 Reaper drone was shot down by Houthi forces, according to US officials the drone was shot down over international waters.

=== 9 November ===
- An Israeli airstrike hit Al-Buraq school on Lababidi Street in the Al-Nasr neighbourhood, north of Gaza City, which was being used by UNRWA as a shelter.
- CIA Director William J. Burns and his Mossad counterpart David Barnea reportedly met with Qatari Prime Minister Sheikh Mohammed bin Abdulrahman bin Jassim Al Thani in Doha to facilitate humanitarian pauses and supplies.
- Israel agreed to daily four-hour pauses of military actions to allow aid into certain regions in northern Gaza and allow civilians to evacuate.
- The al-Aqsa Martyrs' brigades engaged Israeli forces and detonated IEDs in the Balata Camp. The al-Aqsa Martyrs' brigades, al-Qassam brigades, and al-Quds Brigades engaged Israeli forces in small arms clashes and detonated IEDs in Jenin.
- Israel shot down a Houthi ballistic missile south of Eilat.
- The Gaza government media office stated Israel had bombed eight hospitals in the past three days.
- Israel said a drone from Syria struck Eilat, causing damage to a school upon impact.

=== 10 November ===
- The IDF advanced closer to the Al-Shifa hospital and while clashes reported in Tel al-Hawa.
- The PFLP launched its first attack into Israel since 31 October, while seven other mortar and rocket attacks were launched by Palestinian militants into Israel.
- The al-Aqsa Martyrs' brigades claimed another IED attack near Jenin.
- Israeli strikes hit a street just outside Gaza's Indonesia Hospital, where many Palestinians were receiving treatment. The Gaza Ministry of Health stated Israel cut off the hospital's electricity, water, and communication.
- Israeli tanks completely surrounded four hospitals, al-Rantisi Hospital, al-Nasr Hospital, and the eye and mental health hospitals.
- The Nasser Rantissi paediatric cancer hospital caught on fire after being hit by an Israeli airstrike and began evacuations.
- At least three hospitals were hit by Israeli airstrikes, resulting in multiple casualties.
- The Palestinian Red Crescent stated Israeli snipers opened fire on children at al-Quds hospital, killing one and wounding 28.
- Al-Shifa Hospital was bombed five times in 24 hours.
- The International Red Cross stated Gaza's healthcare system had "reached a point of no return."
- Israeli tanks surrounded four hospitals, al-Rantisi Hospital, al-Nasr Hospital, and the eye and mental health hospitals, from all directions.
- The Nasser Rantissi paediatric cancer hospital caught on fire after being hit by an Israeli airstrike and began evacuations.
- The Ministry of Health stated Israel cut off Indonesia Hospital's electricity, water, and communication.

=== 11 November ===
- The Al-Quds brigades launched rockets at Kissufim while the Al-Qassam brigades launched rockets at two locations in southern Israel.
- Six clashes and three demonstrations were reported in the West Bank, primarily Jenin, where unidentified Palestinian fighters threw fireworks and Molotov cocktails at IDF personnel in Silat ad-Dhahr.
- Israeli Agriculture Minister Avi Dichter remarked in an interview on N12 News on the nature of the war that from an operational standpoint, one "cannot wage a war like the IDF wants to in Gaza while the masses are between the tanks and the soldiers," and referred to the situation in Gaza as the "2023 Nakba".
- The Hamas Shati Battalion operating from Al Quds Hospital ambushed IDF troops; 21 militants were killed whereas the Israelis suffered no casualties.
- The Al-Shifa Hospital lost power and caught fire after being shelled, with families and staff killed by IDF snipers. Ashraf al-Qudra, a doctor at al-Shifa, stated the hospital was completely out of service due to the shootings.

=== 12 November ===
- The al-Aqsa Martyrs' brigades claimed attacks into Israeli territory from the West Bank for the first time since the start of the war, while Palestinian militia fighters from Gaza conducted five indirect attacks on Israel.
- A civil defence team in Gaza was hit by an Israeli air strike en route to rescue civilians, injuring some of its workers.
- The director general of al-Shifa mentioned that the lives of 650 patients were in danger at al-Shifa Hospital due to the "catastrophic situation."

=== 13 November ===
- Hamas senior intelligence official Mohammed Dababish was killed.
- The IDF said it had discovered "terrorist infrastructure" at al-Quds University and the Abu Bakr mosque in the area of Al-Shati refugee camp.
- Doctors Without Borders released a statement describing the situation at Al-Shifa Hospital, stating they had no food, water, or electricity, and that there was a sniper attacking patients.

=== 14 November ===
- The IDF operated at Al-Shifa hospital and interrogated patients and medical staff.
- The PFLP called for attacks on Israeli soldiers and civilians.
- The al-Aqsa Martyrs' brigades and al-Qassam brigades claimed IED attacks during clashes with Israeli forces in Tulkarm.
- Al-Qassam brigades launched two attacks on Israel targeting Tel Aviv.
- The IDF opened two humanitarian corridors leading to Salah al-Din Road for civilians to evacuate northern Gaza.
- Israel intercepted a missile over the Red Sea.
- The New York Times published a report by its Visual Investigations team contradicting claims by the IDF that civilian deaths and damage at the al-Shifa Hospital on 10 November had been caused by stray Palestinian projectiles. The report concluded that "some of the munitions were likely fired by Israeli forces", based on video and satellite evidence and an expert analysis of collected weapons fragments.
- Palestinian volleyball player Ibrahim Qusaya was killed in an airstrike.
- Houthi forces shot down a US MQ-1 Predator drone over Yemen.
- Israel started an operation in al-Shifa Hospital, where thousands, including three dozen premature babies, were still sheltering.
- Five bodies of Israelis that were murdered on the Nova music festival massacre were found in recent days using Metal detectors.

=== 15 November ===
- A fuel truck entered Gaza through Rafah crossing for the first time since the war began.
- At least 50 people were killed in the Sabra mosque airstrike.
- The Tulkarm battalion of the Al-Quds Brigades engaged Israeli forces in four small arms clashes and detonated IEDs forces in several areas in Tulkarm.
- ISW reported one anti-Israel demonstration in Ramallah.
- A US warship shot down a Houthi drone in the Red Sea.
- The IDF demolished the Hamas parliament building.
- An al-Shifa employee interviewed by Al Jazeera stated Israel had not brought any aid or supplies, but had "detained and brutally assaulted" men who were sheltering at the hospital.

=== 16 November ===
- The body of Yehudit Weiss, a 65-year-old woman who was kidnapped from Be'eri kibbutz, was found near Al-Shifa hospital.
- Kata'ib Hezbollah threatened to attack US forces in Israel.
- Saraya Al Quds claimed a rocket attack into Israel.
- Hamas claimed an attack on an Israeli checkpoint near East Jerusalem.
- The Indonesia Hospital completely shut down, leaving 45 patients in need of surgery.

=== 17 November ===
- Al-Falah School airstrike.
- The IDF clashed with Al-Quds Brigades and Al Aqsa Martyrs Brigades militants in Jenin over several hours.
- A large number of Jordanian tanks were deployed towards the border with Israel.
- In a keynote address at the Manama Dialogue in Bahrain, Crown Prince and Prime Minister Salman bin Hamad Al Khalifa publicly denounced Hamas' initial attack on Israel, the first Arab leader to do so.
- The Palestinian Red Crescent stated its emergency medical teams were trapped at Al-Ahli Hospital.

=== 18 November ===
- The IDF hit the UN-affiliated Al Fakhoora school housing thousands of displaced Palestinians in the Jabalia camp in northern Gaza, killing at least 50 people.
- Palestinian fighters threw IEDs at Israeli forces operating in Tubas.
- Israel conducted a drone strike in the Balata refugee camp amidst clashes with Palestinian fighters.
- Ayman Safadi, Jordan's Foreign Minister, said at the Manama Dialogue in Bahrain that "no Arab troops will be sent to Gaza" following the Israeli aggression, emphasizing the desire not to be perceived as the enemy.
- The IDF dropped leaflets in the south of the Gaza Strip ordering people to evacuate.
- An evacuation of al-Shifa began.

=== 19 November ===
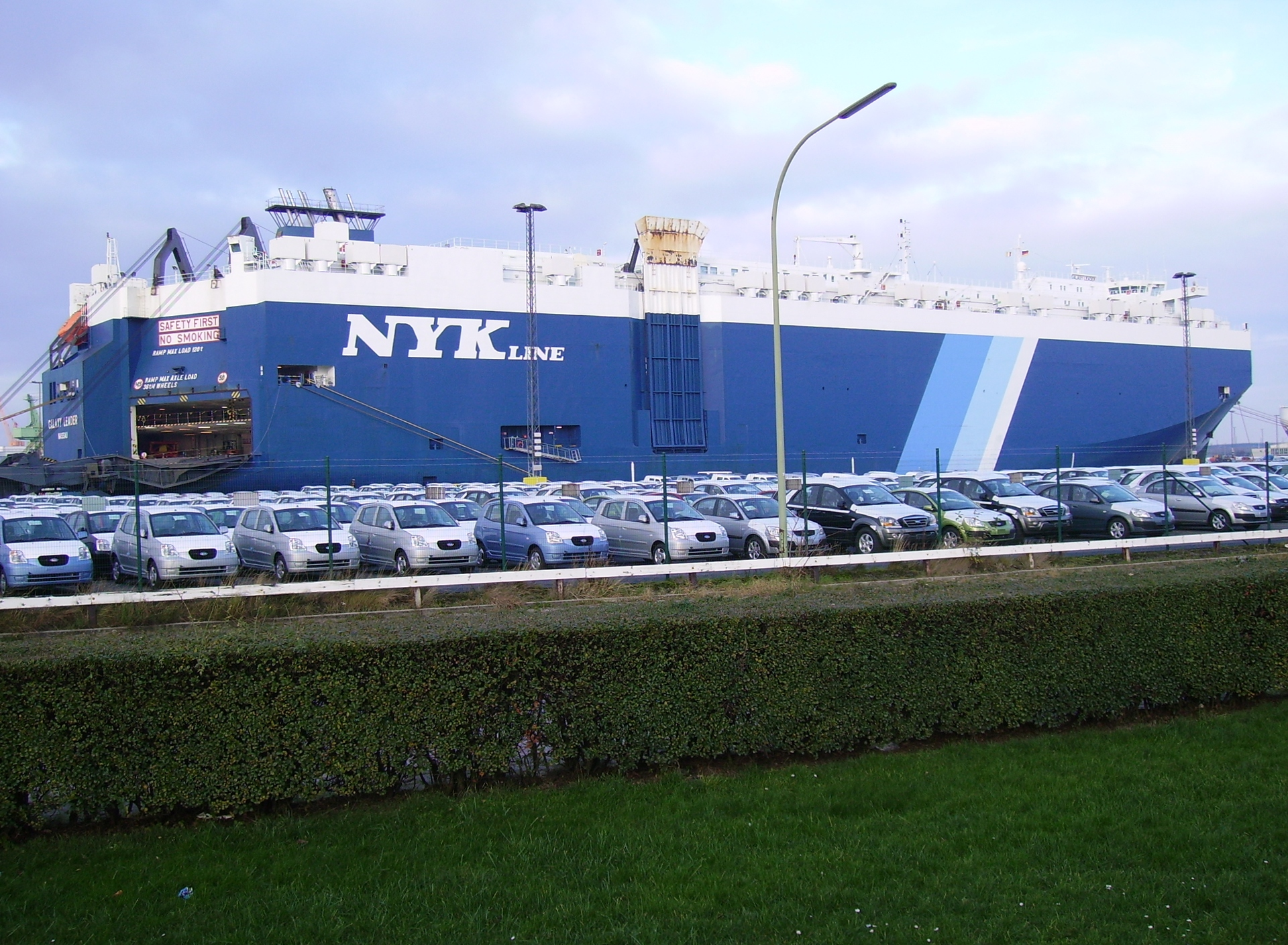
Galaxy Leader, here in 2006 at port in Bremerhaven, Germany, was the first ship to be hijacked of the war

- A group of 31 premature babies were evacuated from al-Shifa hospital to southern Gaza.
- The vehicle carrier Galaxy Leader, which is partially Israeli owned (and chartered by NYK Line) was hijacked in the Red Sea by Houthi militants. No cargo was on the vessel.
- The Jenin brigade of the al-Quds brigades detonated IEDs targeting Israeli forces during a raid against Palestinian fighters and weapons manufacturing sites.

=== 20 November ===
- The Al-Qassam brigades fired a rocket salvo targeting Tel Aviv.
- The Salfit battalion claimed that it attacked two civilian vehicles driven by Israeli settlers near al-Zawiya, West Bank.
- The PIJ claimed that its fighters clashed with Israeli forces near Jericho.
- Israel launched an offensive on Indonesia Hospital with an airstrike that reportedly killed 12 people.
- Following the strike, Israeli tanks surrounded the hospital. Hospital staff reported Israeli soldiers shooting inside indiscriminately. Many sheltered at the hospital, as it was the last functioning one in northern Gaza.
- Staff at the hospital reported Israeli soldiers shooting inside the hospital indiscriminately.
- The Gaza Ministry of Health stated 200 patients were evacuated from the hospital, while an estimated 500 patients remained.

=== 21 November ===
- The Israeli government voted to approve a deal (mediated by Qatar, Egypt, and the U.S.) with Hamas to exchange 150 Palestinian prisoners for 50 hostages. It also approved an agreement for a four–day ceasefire in Gaza. Netanyahu clarified that Israel's war against Hamas would continue after the ceasefire.
- Unspecified Palestinian militia fighters fired small arms and detonated at least one IED at Israeli forces in response to an Israeli raid in the Balata Camp.
- A US AC-130-gunship struck a Kata'ib Hezbollah vehicle near Abu Ghraib, in response to the Islamic Resistance In Iraq's 20 November attack on Al-Asad Airbase.
- Four doctors were reported killed after Israel bombed al-Awda Hospital.
- The World Health Organization stated three hospitals in northern Gaza would be evacuated, meaning there would be no functioning hospitals left in northern Gaza.

=== 22 November ===
- Fighters associated with the PIJ and the al-Aqsa Martyrs' brigades clashed with Israeli forces in Tulkarm.
- Israel and Hamas agreed to a prisoner exchange and a four-day pause in fighting.
- The destroyer USS Thomas Hudner shot down multiple drones launched from Yemen.
- The Palestinian Red Crescent stated fourteen ambulances had arrived at al-Shifa to evacuate the hospital's remaining patients.

=== 23 November ===
- The hostage release was delayed due to "administrative matters".
- The Gaza Health Ministry suspended the evacuation of Al-Shifa Hospital (and its coordination with the WHO) following the arrests of its director and other staff by Israeli forces.
- The Gaza Health Ministry claimed that 27 people were killed in the Abu Hussein School airstrike in the Jabalia refugee camp.
- The IDF and Shin Bet claimed to have killed two militants, including the commander of Hamas' naval forces, using fighter jets.
- The Ayyash Battalion launched a rocket at Shaked settlement from Jenin.
- The Red Cross reported its staff were shot at while providing humanitarian support.
- The Gaza Health Ministry announced it would cease coordination with the WHO on patient evacuations following the Israeli arrest of Palestinian doctors. (Note: The Euro-Mediterranean Human Rights Monitor reported it had received reports that WHO either unwittingly or knowingly facilitated the doctors' arrests.)
- The head of the Medical Emergency Rescue Committee stated patients and staff at the Indonesia Hospital were evacuated to the European Hospital in Khan Younis.
