= Unger =

Unger is a surname literally meaning "Hungarian". It may refer to:

- Alfred H. Unger (1898–1989), German writer, playwright and translator, brother of Wilhelm
- Andrew Unger (born 1979), Canadian writer
- Anna Unger, East German cross country skier
- Annette Unger (born 1962), German violinist and musicologist
- Anthony B. Unger (born 1940), American film producer
- Betty Unger (born 1943), Canadian politician
- Billy Unger (born 1995), American actor
- Brian Unger (born 1965), American comedian, writer, producer, actor, and commentator
- Carl Richard Unger (1817-1897), Norwegian historian and philologist
- Caroline Unger (1803–1877), Austrian contralto
- Chris Unger, American soccer player
- Corey Unger, American musician
- Craig Unger, American journalist and writer
- Daffney Unger, stage name of American wrestler Shannon Spruill
- David A. Unger (born 1971), American literary and film talent agent
- David C. Unger (born 1947), American journalist
- Deborah Kara Unger, Canadian actress
- Else Unger (1873–1936), Austrian designer
- Erich Unger (1887–1950), Jewish philosopher
- Felix Unger (born 1946), Austrian heart specialist
- Ferdinand Thomas Unger (1914–1999), American military officer
- Franz Unger (1800–1870), Austrian botanist
- Frieda Unger (1888–1975), German politician
- Garry Unger (born 1947), Canadian ice hockey player
- Gerhard Unger (1916–2011), German tenor
- Gerard Unger (1942–2018), Dutch graphic developer of type fonts
- Hans Unger (1872–1936), German artist
- Heinz Unger (1895–1965), German conductor
- J. Marshall Unger (born 1947), American linguist
- James Glenwright Unger (born 1985), American hockey player
- James J. Unger (1942–2008), American intercollegiate policy debate coach
- Jim Unger (1937–2012), British-born cartoonist
- Joachim Jacob Unger (1826–1912), Austro-Hungarian rabbi
- Joe Unger (born 1949), American film and TV actor
- Johann Friedrich Unger (1753–1804), German printer
- John Unger (born 1969), American politician from West Virginia
- Jonathan Unger, American journalist
- Joseph Unger (1828–1913), Austrian Jewish jurist and statesman; converted to Catholicism
- Karen Unger (born 1960), American activist and commentator; married name Karen Kwiatkowski
- Kathleen Unger, American attorney and founder, president and CEO of VoteRiders
- Kenneth Russell Unger (1898–1979), American World War I flying ace
- Lars Unger, (born 1972), German footballer
- Lisa Unger, American writer
- Markus Unger (born 1981), German footballer
- Max Unger (sculptor) (1854–1918), German sculptor
- Max Unger (musicologist) (1883–1959), German musicologist
- Max Unger (born 1986), American football player
- Merrill Unger (1909–1980), Bible commentator, scholar, and theologian
- Mordechai Dovid Unger, Hasidic Grand Rabbi of Bobov-45
- Oliver A. Unger (1914–1981), American film and television producer
- Peter Unger, American philosopher
- Rhoda Unger, psychologist
- Richard Unger (born 1942), American historian and academic
- Roberto Mangabeira Unger, Brazilian politician, social theorist and law professor at Harvard
- Stephen A. Unger (born 1946), American executive recruiter, media and entertainment business
- Steve Unger, American politician from Arkansas
- Tobias Unger (born 1979), German sprinter
- Tom Unger (born 1985), German politician
- Tony Unger (1938–2014), Rhodesian field hockey player
- Wilhelm Unger (1904–1985), German writer, journalist and theatre critic
- Wolfgang Unger (1948–2004), German conductor, especially choral conductor

== See also ==
- Ungar
- Ungerer (disambiguation)
