= James Unger =

James Unger may refer to:

- J. Marshall Unger (born 1947), professor of Japanese
- James Glenwright Unger (born 1985), American hockey player
- James J. Unger (1942–2008), coach, teacher and theorist of intercollegiate policy debate
- Jim Unger (1937–2012), British-born Canadian cartoonist
