= Principality of Transylvania (1570–1711) =

Former semi-independent state

Principality of Transylvania Principatus Transsilvaniae
- 1570–1711
- Top: Báthory banner Bottom: Bethlen banner Coat of arms

- Administrative map of the Principality of Transylvania, 1606–60
- Status: Vassal state of the Ottoman Empire; Hungarian crown land; Polish fiefdom
- Capital: Gyulafehérvár (Alba Iulia) 1570–1692; Cibinium (Nagyszeben/Hermannstadt/Sibiu) 1692–1711
- Common languages: Latin (in administration, science and politics); Hungarian (vernacular, language of Diet and legislation); German (vernacular, business, some official functions and instruction); Romanian, Ruthenian (vernacular).
- Religion: Catholicism (both Latin and Romanian Greek Catholicism), Calvinism, Lutheranism, Eastern Orthodoxy, Unitarianism, Judaism
- Demonym: Transylvanian
- Government: Elective principality
- Rulers
  - 1570–1571 (first): John II Sigismund Zápolya
  - 1704–1711 (last): Francis II Rákóczi
- Legislature: Transylvanian Diet
- History
  - Treaty of Speyer: 16 August 1570
  - Bocskai uprising: 28 September 1604–23 June 1606
  - Treaty of Vienna: 23 June 1606
  - Peace of Nikolsburg: 31 December 1621
  - Diploma Leopoldinum: 16 October 1690
  - Treaty of Karlowitz: 26 January 1699
  - Rákóczi's War of Independence: 15 June 1703 – 1 May 1711
  - Peace of Szatmár: 29 April 1711
Preceded by	Succeeded by
Eastern Hungarian Kingdom	Principality of Transylvania (1711–1867)
- Today part of: Romania; Hungary; Slovakia; Ukraine

The Principality of Transylvania (Hungarian: Erdélyi Fejedelemség; Latin: Principatus Transsilvaniae; German: Fürstentum Siebenbürgen; Romanian: Principatul Transilvaniei / Principatul Ardealului; Turkish: Erdel Voyvodalığı / Transilvanya Prensliği) was a semi-independent state ruled by Hungarian princes. It existed as an Ottoman vassal state for the majority of the 16th and 17th centuries, overseen by Ottoman Turkish sultans. At various points during this period, the Habsburgs also exerted a degree of suzerainty in the region. Its territory, in addition to the traditional Transylvanian lands, also included the other major component called Partium, which was in some periods comparable in size with Transylvania proper. The establishment of the principality was connected to the Treaty of Speyer. However, Stephen Báthory's status as king of Poland also helped to phase in the name Principality of Transylvania.

The principality continued to be a part of the Lands of the Hungarian Crown and was a symbol of the survival of Hungarian statehood. It represented Hungarian interests against Habsburg encroachments in the Habsburg-ruled Kingdom of Hungary. Traditional Hungarian law had to be followed scrupulously in the principality; furthermore, the state was predominantly Protestant. After the unsettled period of Rákóczi's War of Independence, it was subordinated to the Habsburg monarchy.

== Background ==
=== Eastern Hungarian Kingdom and Zápolya family ===
On 29 August 1526, the army of Sultan Suleiman of the Ottoman Empire inflicted a decisive defeat on the Hungarian forces at Mohács. John Zápolya was en route to the battlefield with his sizable army but did not participate in the battle for unknown reasons. The youthful King Louis II of Hungary and Bohemia fell in battle, as did many of his soldiers. When Zápolya was proclaimed king of Hungary, Ferdinand from the House of Habsburg also claimed the throne. In the ensuing struggle, John Zápolya received the support of Suleiman, who after Zápolya's death in 1540, occupied Buda and central Hungary in 1541 under the pretext of protecting Zápolya's son, John II Sigismund. Hungary was now divided into three sections: Royal Hungary in the west and north, Ottoman Hungary, and the Eastern Hungarian Kingdom under Ottoman suzerainty, which later became the Principality of Transylvania, where Austrian and Turkish influences vied for supremacy for nearly two centuries. The Hungarian magnates of Transylvania resorted to a policy of duplicity in order to preserve independence.

Transylvania was administrated by Isabella, John Sigismund's mother, from 1541 to 1551, when it fell for five years under Habsburg rule (1551–1556). The House of Zapolya regained the control of Transylvania in 1556, when the Diet of Szászsebes elected Sigismund as prince of Transylvania.

Transylvania was now beyond the reach of Catholic religious authority, allowing Lutheran and Calvinist preaching to flourish. In 1563, Giorgio Blandrata was appointed as court physician, and his radical religious ideas increasingly influenced both the young king John II and the Calvinist bishop Francis David, eventually converting both to the Anti-Trinitarian (Unitarian) creed. In a formal public disputation, Francis David prevailed over the Calvinist Peter Melius; resulting in 1568 in the formal adoption of individual freedom of religious expression under the Edict of Torda. This was the first such legal guarantee of religious freedom in Christian Europe, but only for Lutherans, Calvinists, Unitarians and Catholics; Eastern Orthodox Christians being "tolerated" with no legal guarantees granted.

== Principality of Transylvania ==
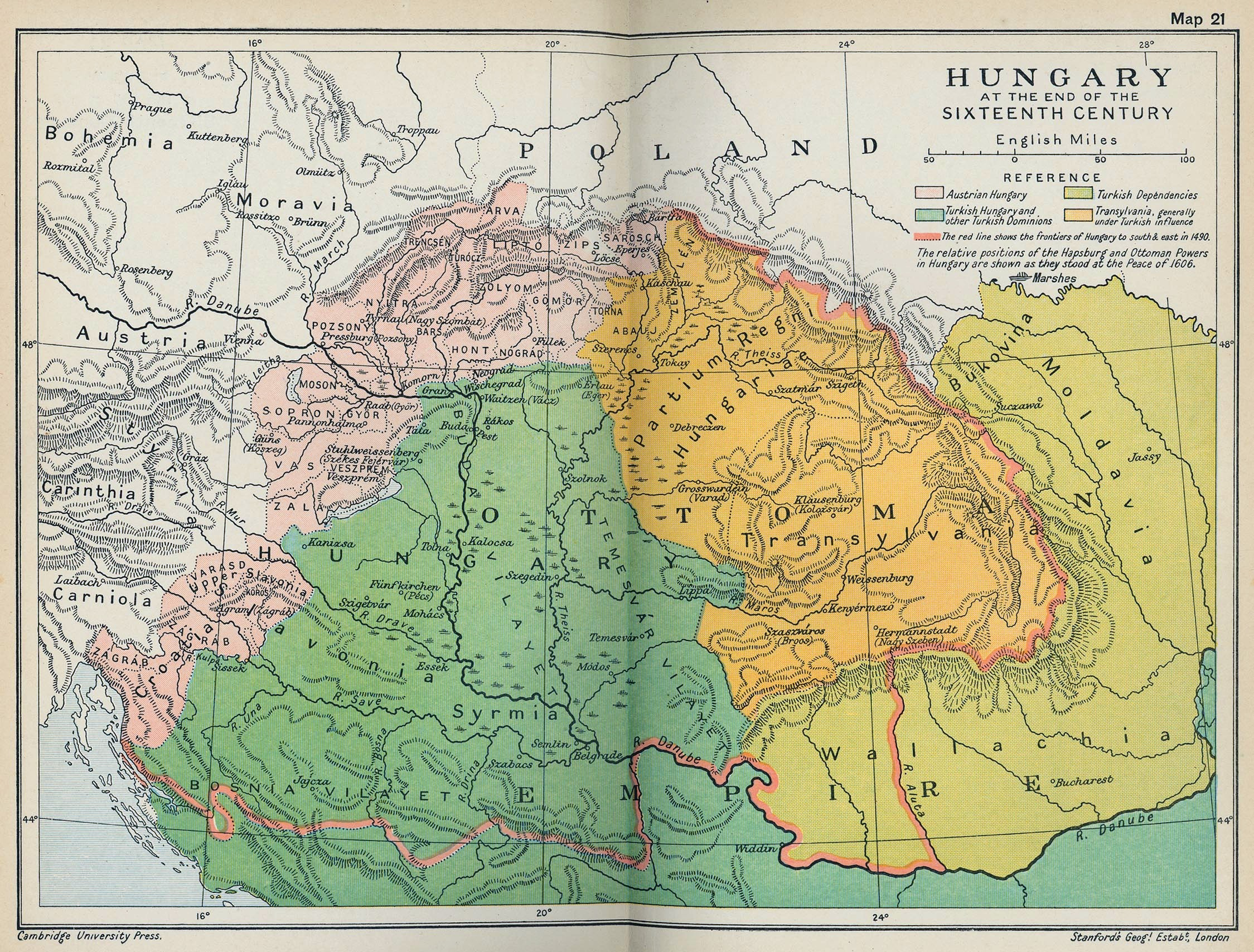
Principality of Transylvania at the end of the 16th century.

The Principality of Transylvania was established in 1570 when John II renounced his claim as King of Hungary in the Treaty of Speyer (ratified in 1571), and became a Transylvanian prince. The treaty also recognized that the Principality of Transylvania belonged to the Kingdom of Hungary in the sense of public law. Upon the death of John II in 1571 the Royal House of Báthory came to power and ruled Transylvania as princes under the Ottomans, and briefly under Habsburg suzerainty, until 1602. Their rise to power marked the beginning of the Principality of Transylvania as a semi-independent state.

Prince Stephen Báthory was the first powerful prince of independent Transylvania, a Hungarian Catholic who later became king under the name Stephen Báthory of Poland. He undertook to maintain the religious liberty granted by the Edict of Torda but interpreted this obligation in an increasingly restricted sense. The latter period of Báthory rule saw Transylvania under Sigismund Báthory – prince of the Holy Roman Empire – enter the Long War, which started as a Christian alliance against the Turks and became a four-sided conflict involving Transylvania, the Habsburgs, the Ottomans, and the voivode of Wallachia, Michael the Brave. After 1601 the principality was for a short time under the rule of Rudolf II, who initiated the Germanization of the population, and in order to reclaim the Principality for Catholicism he initiated the Counter Reformation. From 1604 to 1606, the Hungarian nobleman Stephen Bocskay led a successful rebellion against Austrian rule. Bocskay was elected Prince of Transylvania on 5 April 1603 and prince of Hungary two months later. He achieved the Peace of Vienna in 1606. which afforded religious liberty and political autonomy, the restoration of all confiscated estates, the repeal of all "unrighteous" judgments, and a complete retroactive amnesty for all Hungarians in Royal Hungary, as well as his own recognition as the independent sovereign prince of an enlarged Principality of Transylvania. The Treaty of Vienna (1606) guaranteed the right of Transylvanians to elect their own independent princes, but Georg Keglević, who was the Commander-in-chief, General, Vice-Ban of Croatia, Slavonia and Dalmatia, was since 1602 Baron in Transylvania. It was a very difficult and complicated peace treaty after a long war.

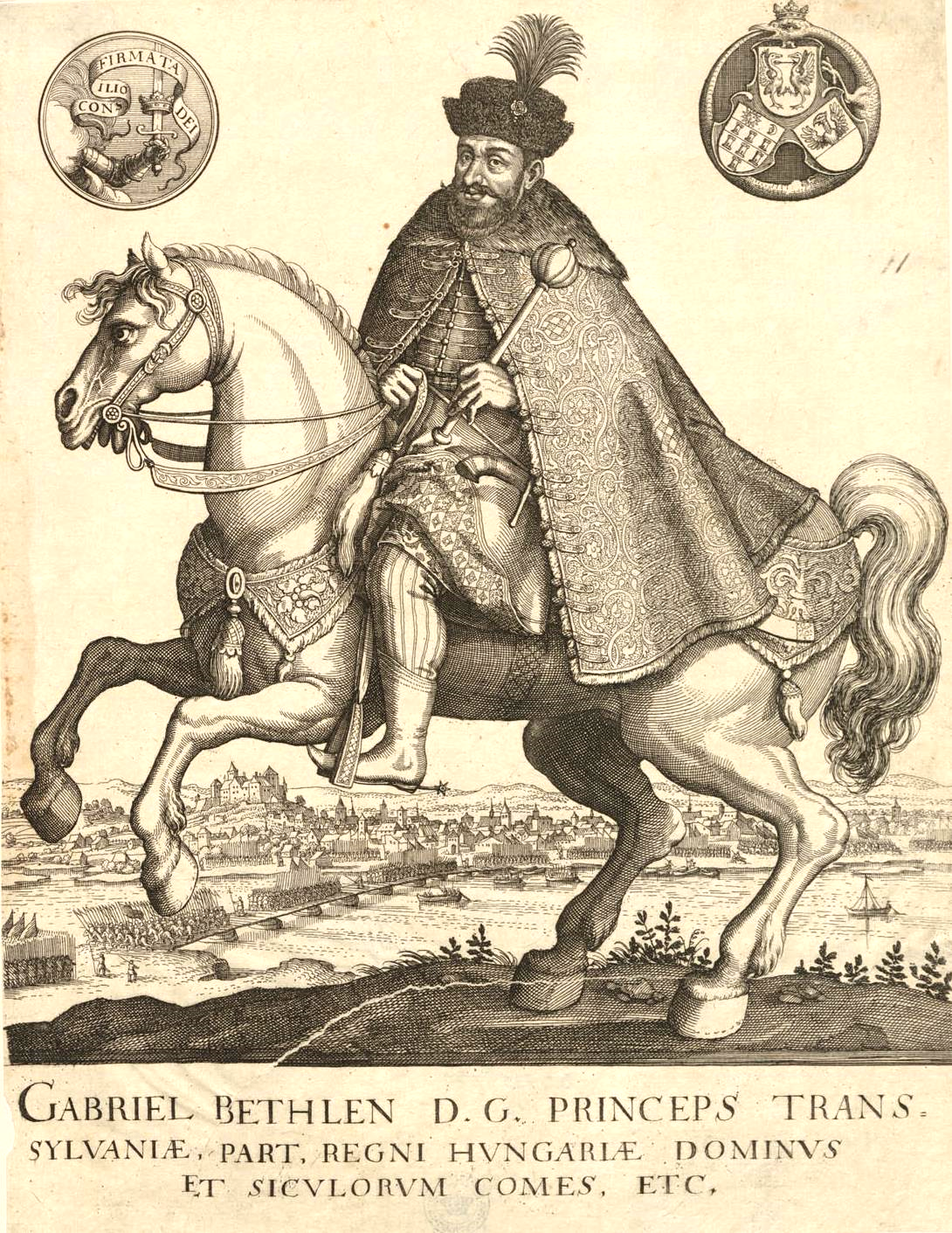
Gabriel Bethlen, Prince of Transylvania

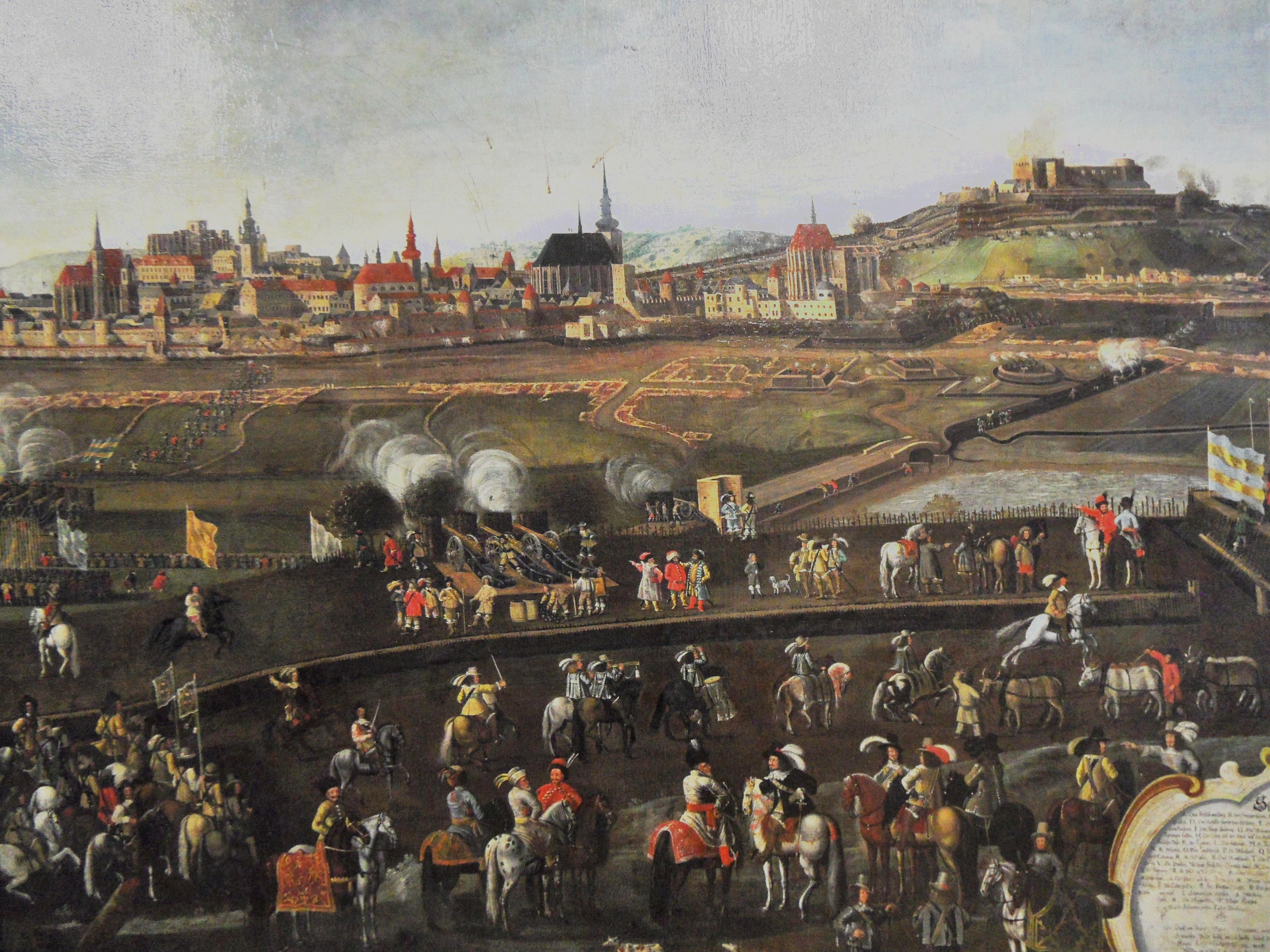
Siege of Brno during the Thirty Years' War in 1645 by Swedish and Transylvanian forces

Under Bocskay's successors Transylvania had its golden age, especially under the reigns of Gábor Bethlen and George I Rákóczi. Gábor Bethlen, who reigned from 1613 to 1629, perpetually thwarted all efforts of the emperor to oppress or circumvent his subjects, and won reputation abroad by championing the Protestant cause. Three times he waged war on the emperor, twice he was proclaimed King of Hungary, and by the Peace of Nikolsburg (31 December 1621), he obtained for the Protestants a confirmation of the Treaty of Vienna, and for himself seven additional counties in northern Hungary. Bethlen's successor, George I Rákóczi, was equally successful. His principal achievement was the Peace of Linz (16 September 1645), the last political triumph of Hungarian Protestantism, in which the emperor was forced to confirm again the articles of the Peace of Vienna. Gabriel Bethlen and George I Rákóczi also did much for education and culture, and their era has justly been called the golden era of Transylvania. They lavished money on the embellishment of their capital, Alba Iulia, which became the main bulwark of Protestantism in Eastern Europe. During their reign, Transylvania was also one of the few European countries where Catholics, Calvinists, Lutherans, and Unitarians lived in mutual tolerance, all of them belonging to the officially accepted religions – religiones receptae, while the Orthodox church, however, were only tolerated. In 1657, George II Rákóczi invaded the Polish–Lithuanian Commonwealth.

The fall of Nagyvárad to the expansionist Ottomans on 27 August 1660 marked the decline of the Principality. To counter the Ottoman threat, the Habsburgs determined to gain influence in and perhaps control of this territory. Under Prince Kemeny, the diet of Transylvania proclaimed the secession of a sovereign Transylvania from the Ottomans (April 1661) and appealed for help to Vienna, but a secret Habsburg-Ottoman agreement resulted in the further increase of Habsburg influence. After the defeat of the Ottomans at the Battle of Vienna in 1683, the Habsburgs gradually began to impose their rule on the formerly autonomous Transylvania. Following the 1699 Treaty of Karlowitz, Transylvania was formally attached to Habsburg-controlled Hungary, and subjected to the direct rule of the emperor's governors. From 1711 onward, Habsburg control over Transylvania was consolidated, and the princes of Transylvania were replaced with governors.

== Demographics ==
=== Ruling system ===
Until 1691 Transylvania was ruled by Unio Trium Nationum, the three state-constituting socio-ethnical entities termed "nations", consisting of the Hungarian nobility, the Saxon urban settlers, and the Székely peasant-soldiers, while a significant part of the general population, consisted of Orthodox Romanians, remained deprived of any civil and political rights.

=== The Composition of the Parliament ===
The Unio Trium Nationum (Latin for "Union of the Three Nations") was a pact of mutual aid codified in 1438 by three Estates of Transylvania: the (largely Hungarian) nobility, the Saxon (German) patrician class, and the free military Székelys. The union was directed against the whole of the peasantry, regardless of ethnicity, in response to the Transylvanian peasant revolt. In this feudal estate parliament, the peasants (whether Hungarian, Saxon, Székely or Romanian in origin) were not represented, and they did not benefit from its acts, as the commoners were not considered to be members of these feudal "nations".

The coalition of the "Three Nations" retained its legal representative monopoly under the prince as before the split of the medieval Hungarian Kingdom occasioned by the Ottoman invasions. According to Dennis P. Hupchick, though there were occasional clashes between the Hungarian plainsmen and the Székely mountaineers, they were united under the patronymic "Magyars" and, with Saxon support, formed a common front against the predominantly Romanian peasantry.

=== Demographic evolution ===
There is an ongoing scholarly debate between Hungarian and Romanian historians regarding the medieval population of Transylvania. While some Romanian historians claim continuous Romanian majority, Hungarian historians claim the continuous settlement of Romanians into the Kingdom of Hungary. Official censuses with information on Transylvania's population have been conducted since the 18th century, but the ethnic composition was the subject of different modern estimations.

Nicolaus Olahus, Primate of Hungary stated in the book Hungaria et Athila in 1536 that in Transylvania "Four nations of different origins live in it: Hungarians, Székelys, Saxons, and Vlachs"

Based on a work by Antun Vrančić (1504–1573), Expeditionis Solymani in Moldaviam et Transsylvaniam libri duo. De situ Transsylvaniae, Moldaviae et Transalpinae liber tertius, more estimations exist as the original text is translated/interpreted in a different way, especially by Romanian and Hungarian scholars. According to Hungarian interpretations, Vrančić wrote about the inhabitants of Transylvania and about the Romanians: "The country is inhabited by three nations, Székelys, Hungarians, and Saxons; I should also add the Romanians who – even though they easily equal any of the others in number – have no freedom, no aristocracy, no right of their own, besides a small number living in the Haţeg district, where the capital of Decebalus is believed to have stood, and who, during the time of John Hunyadi, a native of those places, were granted aristocratic status because they had always taken part in the struggle against the Turks. The rest of them are all commoners, serfs of the Hungarians, having no places of their own, spread all over the territory, in the whole country, sparsely inhabited in open regions, mountains and forests, they mostly live out their miserable lives hiding together with their flocks." In Romanian interpretations, it is noted that the proper translation of the first part of the sentence would be: "...I would nevertheless add the Romanians, who – even though they easily equal the others in number – ..."

Romanian historians Ioan Bolovan and Sorina-Paula Bolovan argue that the Romanians were the majority during the life of Antun Vrančić. Based on their works, in 1690 there was an absolute Romanian majority, and no significant demographic change happened between the Middle Ages and 1750, when the Austrian administration tracked newcomers, which also explained concerns about Transylvanian Romanians leaving for Wallachia and Moldavia, including Emperor Joseph II.

Károly Kocsis and Eszter Kocsisné Hodosi argue that the Hungarians were the most numerous ethnic group before the second half of the 17th century, when they were exceeded by Romanians. They assert the following structure of the population: in 1595, out of a total population of 670,000, 52% were Hungarians, 28% Romanians, 19% Germans. Around 1650, in a letter written to the Sultan, Moldavian prince Vasile Lupu affirms that the number of Romanians was one-third of the population. By 1660, according to Miklós Molnár, 955,000 people lived in the principality (Partium included) and the population consisted of 500,000 Hungarians (including 250,000 Székelys), 280,000 Romanians, 90,000 Germans and 85,000 Serbians, Ukrainians and others and had reached its end-of-century level.

On the other hand, according to Dennis P. Hupchick, Romanians were the majority population in the region during the rule of Stephen Báthory (16th century). In 1600, according to George W. White, Romanians, who were primarily peasants, constituted more than 60 percent of the population. This theory is supported by Ion Ardeleanu, who states that the Romanian population represented "the overwhelming majority" in the age of Michael the Brave. According to Louis Roman, various works from the 17th century claim that Romanians were the most numerous ethnic group in Transylvania during that time, including those of Johannes Tröster, Grigore Ureche, and Miron Costin.

The period 1567–1661 had a deep demographic impact on the country. Transylvania was repeatedly ravaged by war between 1657 and 1661. Evliya Çelebi, accompanying Ali Pasha's army into Transylvania in 1661, reported vast areas, comparable in size to counties, being reduced to ashes, entire villages being put to the sword, and groups of 3,000–8,000 captives. The Transylvanian populations suffered huge losses, the Partium and the counties of Belső-Szolnok, Doboka, Kolozs, Közép-Szolnok, and Kraszna were laid waste. According to the Nagysink diet in 1664: "Over an area of five or six miles around a village, one would not find a single hut left standing, nor a single man alive, for they had been abducted, slain, or felled by the plague... while most of the poorest folk died from starvation".

According to Zsolt Trócsányi, the official estimates made by the Austrian administrative authority (Verwaltungsgericht) dating from 1712 to 1713, the ethnic distribution of the population in Transylvania is as follows: 47% Hungarians, 34% Romanians, 19%, Saxons. Ioan Aurel Pop, on the other hand, asserts that the Austrian censuses of 1713 and 1733 indicate that ethnic Romanians made up approximately 63-65% of the Transylvanian population, while Hungarians, Székelys, and Saxons accounted for around 35-37%. In Benedek Jancsó's estimation, there were 250,000 Romanians, 150,000 Hungarians and 100,000 Saxons in Transylvania at the beginning of the 18th century. In 1720, according to Károly Kocsis and Eszter Kocsisné Hodosi, out of a total population of 806,221, 50% were Romanians, 37% Hungarians, 12% Germans.

=== Immigration and emigration of Romanians ===
The change of ethnic composition of the Principality of Transylvania and the influence of migrations is also subject to debate among historians. The Hungarian historiography claims that a large immigration of ethnic Romanians took place into the Principality of Transylvania, while the Romanian historiography asserts that there was more emigration towards Moldavia and Wallachia than vice versa.

Transylvania survived as a state, and this peace facilitated its reconstruction and a gradual economic recovery, which themselves attracted new settlers from the surrounding countries into Transylvania. In addition, the population density of Transylvania was lower than it was in royal Hungary. These circumstances favoured immigration: over these decades, people moved in significant numbers to the principality, mainly from Moldavia, but from Wallachia as well. As a result of two decades of peaceful rule and economic policy of Prince Michael I Apafi, the population in Transylvania increased. The labor shortage that developed as a result of the good economic conditions also favored immigration. The prince's patient and understanding religious policy offered shelter to all groups persecuted because of their religion. All the Transylvanian princes of this era strove to win the Transylvanian Romanian population to the cause of development and progress with the help of religious reform, to make the Romanian ethnic element just as useful for Transylvania as the other three nations were: Hungarian, Székely and Saxon. The efforts of these Hungarian princes were so successful that the Transylvanian Romanians became the creators, founders, and then the transmitters of Romanian culture to their brothers living beyond the Carpathians. Enjoying the full help of the princely power, the Transylvanian Romanians were able to grow numerically, according to Árpád Kosztin.

Evliya Çelebi (1611–1682) was an Ottoman explorer who traveled through the territory of the Ottoman Empire and neighboring lands over a period of forty years, recording his commentary in a travelogue called the Seyahatnâme "Book of Travel". His trip to Hungary took place between 1660 and 1666. The Transylvanian's state of development in the 17th century was so good that it was an attraction to strangers longing for its territory. Evliya Çelebi wrote in his book that the Romanian serfs moved en masse to Transylvania because of the extreme ruthlessness of the rulers of Romanian lands, and the justice, legal order, and low taxes in Transylvania.

In Wallachia the beys were very tyrannical over them, therefore these rayahs saying: "Let justice be justice", all moved to Transylvania and pay one gold tribute to the king and they have no other duties.

— Evliya Çelebi: Seyahatnâme

With the various Turkish, Tatar, and Cossack raids, and especially those due to the constant harassment and extortion of the Greeks, who were the tenants of the incomes of the two neighboring Romanian voivodeships, the entire population of some villages fled to Transylvania. In a diploma of Prince Gabriel Bethlen: "The Saxon priests belonging to the Kézdi chapter inform us that before that a village called Kövesd was inhabited by all Saxons, but now due to the many wars, it has been so destroyed that there are more Vlachs living in it like a Saxon." In 1648, Prince George I. Rákóczi wrote in a letter: "Our Saxon bishop called us together with his seniors under his bishopric, reporting that since the number of Saxons in Réten had greatly decreased and the Vlachs, vice versa, had multiplied greatly". In 1663, the Wallachian voivode Ghica wrote to Michael I Apafi, Prince of Transylvania regarding the runaway Romanian serfs of the Filipescu boyar. In 1668, the population of several Romanian villages migrated to Transylvania and the Romanian voivodes harassed Prince Michael I Apafi with demands that the "runaway villeins" be repatriated, and voivode Ghica was talking about entire Romanian groups. In 1668, the voivode of Wallachia wrote to Michael I Apafi regarding a large number of escaped Romanian villages: "From our realm, a couple of villages have escaped into the realm of your greatness, some to Fogaras (Făgăraș) county, some to Brassó (Brașov), some to Szeben (Sibiu), and they did not flee because of their rascality but only for the heaviness of the tax." And in 1676, the Moldavian voivode Rosetti wrote twice to the Transylvanian prince because of his runaway serfs. The Romanian peasantry, which flooded into Transylvania in this way, could take the place of the Hungarian, Székely and Saxon population decimated by the vicissitudes of the war, and their remaining real estate and property, without any difficulties.

As a result of heavy taxes and hard services demanded, many serfs of the principalities of Moldavia and Wallachia migrated into Transylvania where the laws were more favorable. According to Hungarian estimations 350,000–500,000 Romanians migrated to Transylvania in the 18th century.

After the death of Prince Michael I Apafi, between 1690 and 1703, many people emigrated from Transylvania due to the tax burdens of the government that did not take into account the local circumstances. Furthermore, between 1703 and 1711 the armies of the Habsburg emperors and Francis II Rákóczi fought each other during the Rákóczi's War of Independence. Escapes accompanying the war, famines and epidemics – mainly the plague – also greatly decimated the population. The ordeals of the Counter-Reformation carried out by military force also contributed to the decline of the population. Many Protestant families and groups – Hungarians, Székelys and Saxons – were forced to flee.

Many Romanians also migrated from Transylvania towards Moldavia and Wallachia. This phenomenon, also existing in the Middle Ages during the foundation of Moldova and Wallachia, was amplified after György Dózsa's rebellion of 1514, the religious persecutions and the worsening standard of living of Romanian Transylvanians. The fiscal policy of the Principality of Moldavia, indulgent towards newcomers, has allowed many of them to move there, creating new settlements, such as those that are named Ungureni. The juridicial discrimination of Romanian Transylvanians increased from the time of the Diet of 1502, and their economic position worsened. From the Diet of 1552, for example, in comparison to Hungarians and Saxons, it was easier for ethnic Romanians to be accused before the law. Such discriminations were also noticed by foreign visitors in Transylvania.

In 1552, the Hungarian nobles in the area of Deva complained about a "massive fleeing" towards Wallachia, due to the looting practiced by Castaldo's army. The Cluj Diet of 1593 constated that "our haughty serfs, gathered in large groups and raised, immediately can go to the Romanian countries, even if they commit any illegality, they go there freely". In 1602 Giorgio Basta ordered the dwellers of Bistrița to guard the roads, the passes and the paths towards Moldavia, to prevent the Transylvanian serfs getting the Principality. In 1607 the Transylvanian Diet urged the Prince of Transylvania to demand from the Moldovan Voivode the restitution of the runaway serfs to their original lords. In 1609 the Transylvanian Diet requested that "there should be taken measures to stop their (Transylvanian serfs') crossing towards the Principates". In 1635, the delegates of Vasile Lupu solicited the movement of serfs near Cluj to Moldavia. Similarly, in 1662 Michael I Apafi urged the dwellers of Bistrița to stop the movement of the impoverished people towards Moldavia.

From the 16th century some ethnic Romanians started moving from Transylvania towards Poland, Silesia and Moravia, where they formed the ethnoregion of Moravian Wallachia.

According to Árpád Kosztind, the Romanians were not affected by the Counter-Reformation, and no Romanians was forced to flee for religious reasons. On other hand, according to Bolovan Ioan and Ștefan Meteș, the fact that Romanians belonged to the Orthodox Church and not to any Western Christian denomination was the cause of their remaining of political, economic and cultural inferiority to Hungarians, Szekelys and Saxons, making them more willing to emigrate towards Moldova and Wallachia. Not by chance, a good part of the Romanian elite, but sometimes also simple people, emigrated, passing south and east of the Carpathians to the Romanian states of Moldavia and Wallachia, where they were able to assert themselves unfettered on all levels. It is also true that a small part of the Romanian nobility, as much as survived after the attempts of the Hungarian royalty to Catholicize in the previous centuries, in some places embraced one of the new reformed confessions.

Food shortages, the famine of 1684–1686, caused by an increase in the price of grains, lead some of inhabitants to leave Transylvania, and many of the villages in the Fundus Regius remained abandoned. The Diet of Vásárhely of December 1694 claims that one third of the population of Făgăraș Country emigrated to Wallachia. On 7 May 1699, the Austrian Emperor Leopold I blamed the Transylvanian ruling class for the fleeing of the population towards the Danubian Principalities and other Ottoman-controlled areas. By the 18th century, the emigration of Romanians towards Moldavia and Wallachia further increased.

== Gallery ==
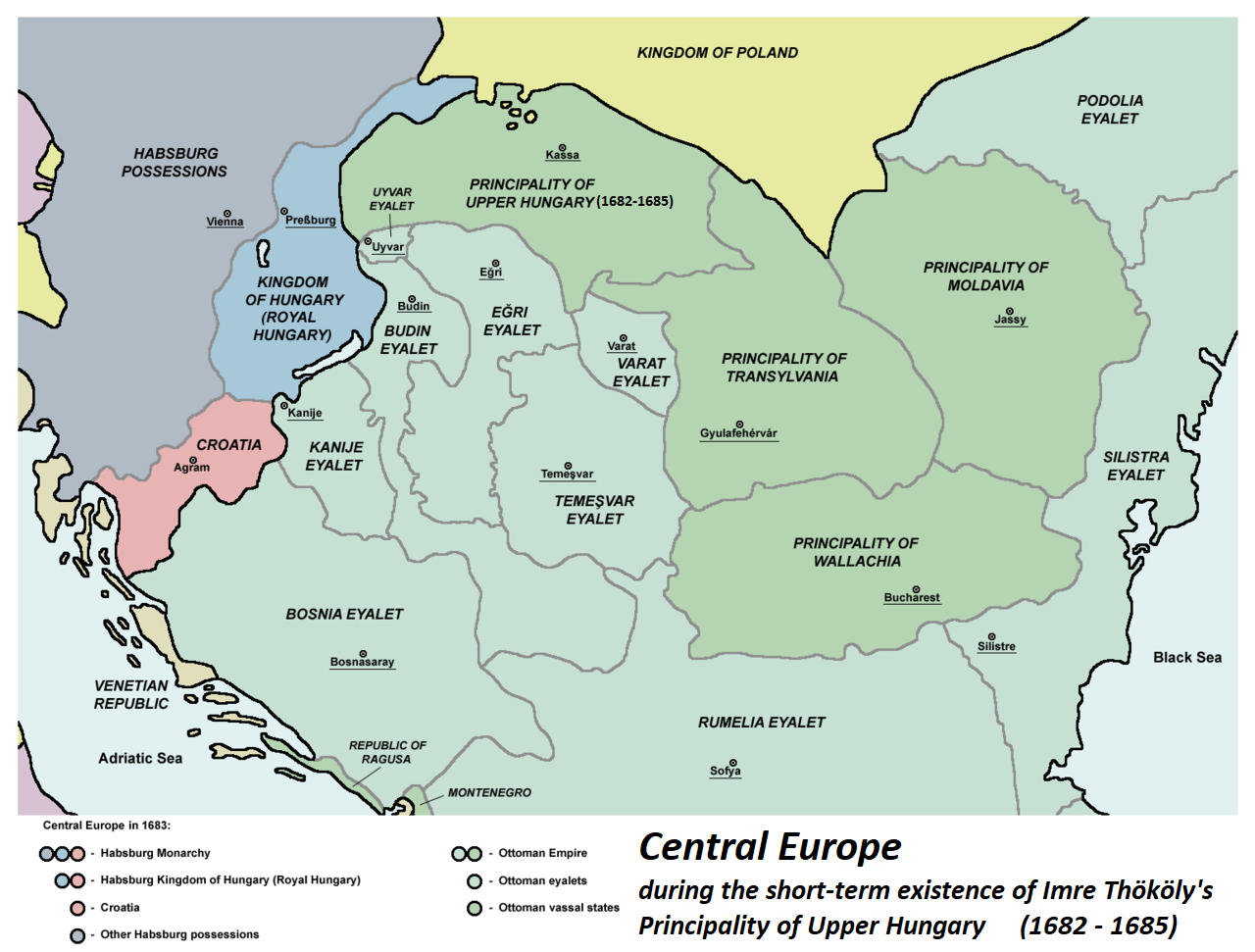
The partition of medieval Kingdom of Hungary between the Ottoman and Habsburg empires lasted more than 150 years after the Battle of Mohács in 1526

The Principality of Transylvania, the successor of Eastern Hungarian Kingdom (1570). Partium is depicted in the darker colour
