= Unger (disambiguation) =

Unger is a surname.

Ungar may also refer to:

- Unger (Bishop of Poland)
- Unger, West Virginia
- Unger Island, a small, ice-free island of Antarctica
- Unger Peak

== See also ==
- Ungar
- Ungerer (disambiguation)
- Ungern
