= Frieda Unger =

German politician

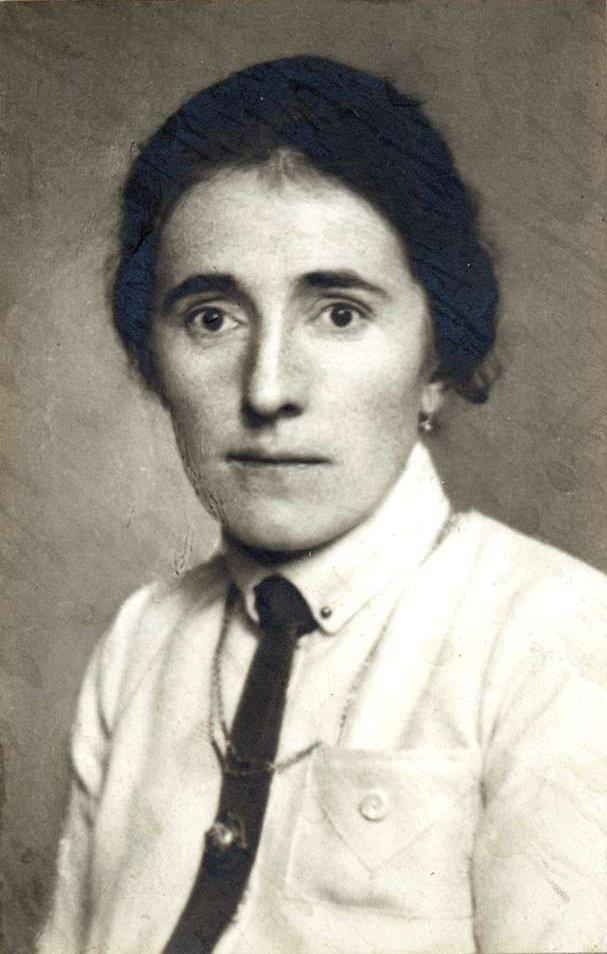
- Frieda Unger (ca. 1921)
- Born: Frieda Eckert; 9 July 1888; Schopfheim, Baden, Germany
- Died: 12 April 1975 (aged 86); East Berlin, German Democratic Republic
- Occupations: Activist and politician
- Political party: SPD; USPD; KPD
- Spouses: Karl Unger, Max Haas
- Children: 4
- Parent(s): Karl Friedrich Eckert; Maria Crescentia Stalder

Frieda Unger (born Frieda Eckert; 9 July 1888 – 12 April 1975) was a German activist and politician (SPD, USPD, KPD) who served as a member of the Parliament ("Landtag") of Baden. Her candidacy for the national parliament ("Reichstag") was not successful, however.

== Life ==
Frieda Eckert was born in Schopfheim in the south-west of Germany. Her father is described variously as a smallholder and as a master mason with a substantial business that later went bankrupt when the demand for masonry skills collapsed overnight as a result of the rapid development of the cement and concrete based building methods. Karl Eckert died when Frieda was three after which she grew up in Schopfheim with her grandparents. On leaving school she relocated across the river to Basel where by the time she was 16 she was working in as a domestic servant with one of the city's "patrician family". She also took work as a sales assistant. It was while living in Basel that she met and in 1909 married her first husband, Karl Unger, a building worker and a politically active member of the Social Democratic Party (SPD). In 1908 the ban on female participation in party politics had been lifted and in 1911 Frieda Unger also joined the SPD. At a meeting of striking workers she discovered her natural talent for public speaking and political agitation.

In 1915 Frieda and Karl Unger relocated to Lahr, a small town on what in 1919 would become the German side of the Rhine, between Freiburg and Strasbourg. Meanwhile, the party leadership's implementation of what amounted to a parliamentary truce in respect of funding the war which had broken out in July 1914 triggered widespread dismay among the party membership. From the outset Frieda Unger, now increasingly involved politically, opposed the war: as frontline slaughter and economic destitution at home mounted she was one of many across Germany who broke away from the mainstream party to form the Independent Social Democratic Party ("Unabhängige Sozialdemokratische Partei Deutschlands" / USPD) in 1917.

After war ended in military defeat, a series of revolutions broke out in the northern ports and then more generally across Germany. In 1919 Frieda Unger was elected to the Baden Citizens' Committee. She called for a radical approach in confronting property owners and entrepreneurs and was one of those demanding a Republic of Soviets. She also became centrally involved in the critical efforts to secure food supplies for the town. As the year of revolutions gave way to years of economic hardship she remained politically engaged, serving a member of the Parliament ("Landtag") of Baden between 1921 and 1925. She was elected as a USPD member, but as the political left continued to fragment, in 1922 Frieda Unger moved across, like most of the USPD activists, to the recently formed Communist Party of Germany. According to one source, during the course of her political awakening she took inspiration from Rosa Luxemburg and was known personally to Clara Zetkin.

In September 1923, as the great inflation peaked, she was a negotiator on behalf of the "hunger demonstrators". The next month, she took a leading part in the attempted Coup in central Baden. The objective was the establishment of a Republic of Soviets. The uprising failed. As one of its most visible leaders Frieda Unger was arrested and taken into investigative detention. In November 1923 she managed to escape, helped by her husband who by this time was also a Communist Party activist. However, shortly after that she was re-arrested, and remained in custody until May 1924 despite her membership of the Landtag which might have been expected to confer immunity from arrest. (There are indications that she was allowed out of jail to attend parliamentary sittings, but taken back into custody when the other Landtag members headed home in the evenings.)

Local elections took place in October 1925 following which Frieda Unger was no longer a Landtag member. She "went underground", but was found and re-arrested. In May 1926 she was tried under the terms of the Law for the Protection of the Republic (Gesetz zum Schutze der Republik), enacted a few years earlier in July 1922. The High Court in Leipzig found her guilty and sentenced her to a two and a half jail term on account of her part in the political unrest two and a half years earlier. Vorwärts, the party newspaper of the SPD (party), commented that it was a harsh sentence, which was to be expected in the case of a communist. She was sent to the Bruchsal penitentiary to serve out her sentence. Her early release on 1 October 1927 resulted from a presidential amnesty as the authorities attempted to reintegrate political activists who had been arrested during the troubled first half of the 1920s back into the political mainstream. However, there was no longer any role made available to her within the local Communist Party.

In July 1925 Frieda Unger's marriage to Karl Hauser had ended in divorce, and on 20 November 1926 she had married Max Haas, who had also been a participant in the failed 1923 uprising. He was from Lahr, and for the next few years the two of them ran a kiosk in the town. In 1930 they moved to Berlin. There she worked in the city centre as a district leader for the "National Association of Workplace Invalidity Victims" ("Zentralverband der Arbeitsinvaliden"). The political context changed abruptly after January 1933 when the Nazis took power and lost no time in transforming Germany into a one-party dictatorship. After the Reichstag fire at the end of February 1933, those with a political past involving the (now banned) Communist Party found themselves at the top of the government's target list. Many were arrested (or worse) or fled abroad. Frieda Haas nevertheless continued to associate with politically like minded comrades: specifically, her apartment became a meeting point for Communist resistance members. Nevertheless, other sources, apparently based on information provided by Frieda Haas herself at the end of her life, indicate a conscious decision on her part to keep out of politics during the Nazi years.

In 1937 the resistance group with which she was associated was broken up and Frieda Haas spent eight months in detention, arrested by the Gestapo and held in "protective detention" by the police for two or three months before transferred to the large investigatory penitentiary at Berlin-Moabit. before being released. Around this time Max Haas was conscripted into the army. According to one source she was arrested again, possibly more than once, and incarcerated by the Gestapo for terms of several months.

War and the Nazi regime ended in May 1945, with the western two thirds of Germany divided into four military areas of occupation. A large region surrounding Berlin, including the eastern part of the city itself, was now administered as the Soviet occupation zone. It was here that Frieda Haas now made her home. Edwin Hoernle found her work as an instructor with the National Administration for Agriculture and Forestry, where she worked between 1945 and 1948 or 1950, becoming a department head. With the reform of land ownership high on the political agenda, there was much to be done. She was also a member of the National Executive ("Zentralvorstand") of what is sometimes translated as the Peasants Mutual Aid Association ("Vereinigung der gegenseitigen Bauernhilfe" / VdgB).

As a pensioner, from 1950 she served for several years on the national executive of the Democratic Women's League ("Demokratischer Frauenbund Deutschlands" / DFD). She also led a National Front district residents' group in Berlin-Johannisthal until 1968. However, on reaching her seventieth birthday she withdrew completely from public life in 1968 on health grounds.

Frieda Haas died in East Berlin on 13 April 1975.

== Awards and honours ==
- 1968 Patriotic Order of Merit in silver.

At the instigation of the Women's advisory board the municipal council in Lahr passed a resolution on 18 December 2006 as a result of which a memorial tablet commemorating Frieda Unger was set up at the Luisenschule (primary school). The decision was contentious, supported by the votes of 16 councillors, with 12 opposing it and one abstention.
