= Ongarato =

Ongarato is an Italian surname. Notable people with the surname include:

- Alberto Ongarato (born 1975), Italian cyclist
- Franco Ongarato (born 1949), Italian cyclist
