= Ungureanu =

Ungureanu may refer to:

- Adelina Budai-Ungureanu (born 2000), Romanian volleyball player
- Corina Ungureanu (born 1980), Romanian artistic gymnast
- Cornel Mihai Ungureanu (born 1965), Romanian novelist and journalist
- Emil Ungureanu (1936–2012), Romanian chess player
- Ion Ungureanu (1935–2017), Moldovan actor and politician
- Marius Ungureanu (born 1994), Romanian biathlete
- Mihai Răzvan Ungureanu (born 1968), Romanian historian, diplomat and politician
- Monica Ungureanu (born 1988), Romanian judoka
- Nicolae Ungureanu (1956–2026), Romanian football player
- Paula Ungureanu (born 1980), Romanian handball player
- Pavel Vasici-Ungureanu (1806–1881), Romanian physician
- Teodora Ungureanu (born 1960), Romanian gymnast
- Traian Ungureanu (born 1958), Romanian journalist and politician
- Vasile Ungureanu (born 1957), Romanian water polo player

== See also ==
- Ungureanu River, tributary of the Șușara River in Romania
- Ungureanu cabinet, cabinet of ministers which briefly governed Romania during early 2012
- Ungureni (disambiguation)
