= Galaxy Leader =

Ship hijacked by Houthi pirates

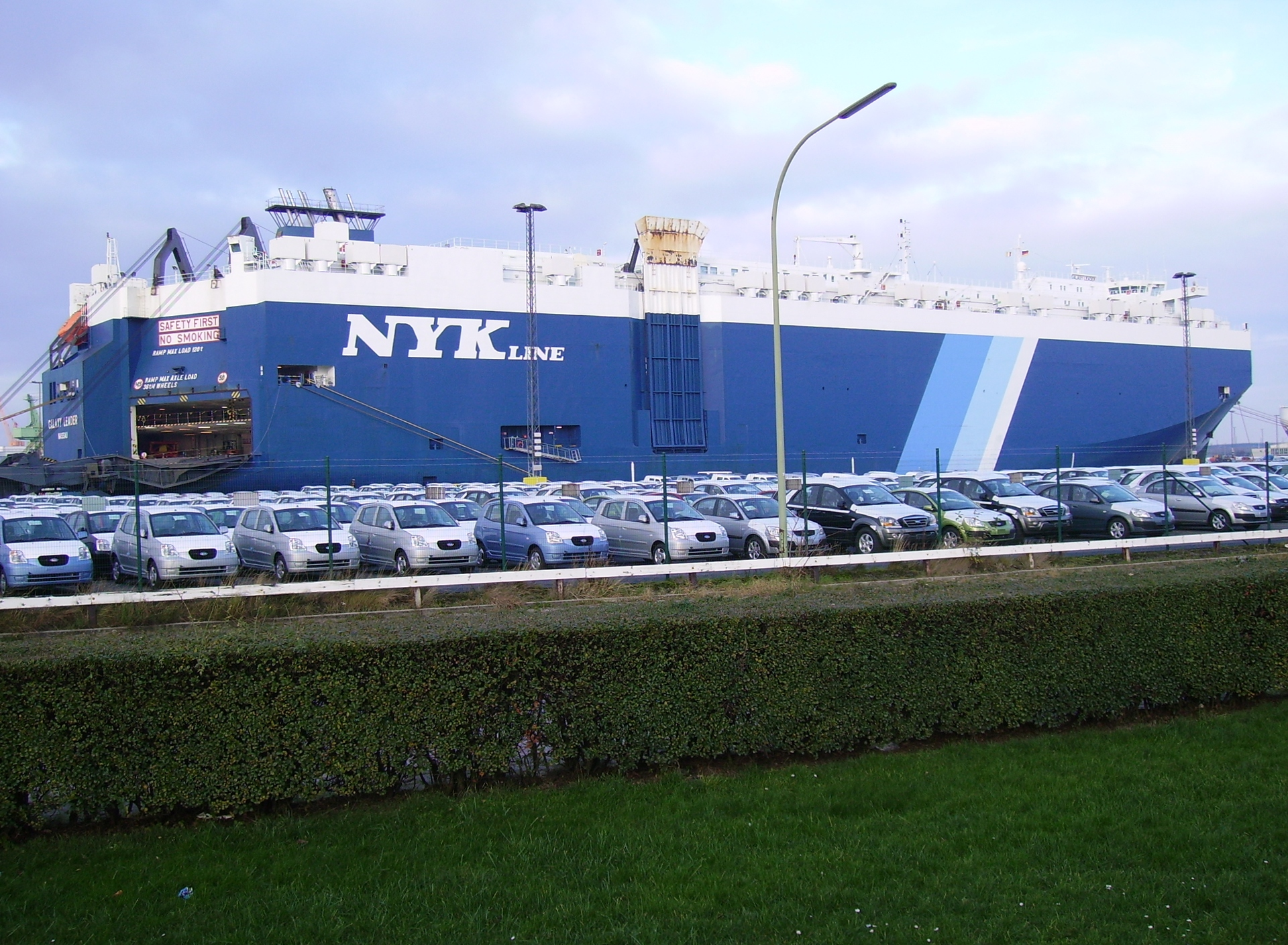
- Galaxy Leader at Bremerhaven, 2006

History
- Name: Galaxy Leader
- Operator: Nippon Yusen
- Port of registry: Nassau
- Builder: Stocznia Gdynia
- Yard number: 8213/1
- Launched: May 18, 2002
- Completed: June 26, 2002
- Identification: Call sign: C6SO2; IMO number: 9237307; MMSI number: 311408000
- Status: Hijacked and held by the Houthis

General characteristics
- Tonnage: 48,710 GT; 15,397 NT
- Length: 189.20 m (620 ft 9 in)
- Beam: 32.29 m (105 ft 11 in)
- Height: 13.99 m (45 ft 11 in)
- Draft: 9.52 m (31 ft 3 in)
- Crew: 25

Galaxy Leader was a roll-on/roll-off vehicle carrier built in 2002 at Stocznia Gdynia in Gdynia, Poland. It was operated by the Japanese shipping company Nippon Yusen, and owned by Galaxy Maritime Ltd., which in turn is owned by Ray Car Carriers, Ltd., which is co-owned by Israeli businessman Abraham Ungar. In November 2023, the ship was hijacked by Houthis, who seized the ship and took its 25 crew members hostage in Yemen. The ship was struck by the Israeli Air Force in July 2025.

== Technical specifications ==
The vehicle carrier is powered by a Sulzer seven-cylinder, two-stroke diesel engine of type 7RTA-62U with a power of 15,540 kW (20,840 hp). The engine drives a propeller. Three generators, powered by two MAN diesel engines of type 7L28/32H and one MAN diesel engine of type 6L28/32H, are available for power generation. Additionally, there is an emergency generator driven by another diesel engine of type MAN D 2866. The ship is equipped with an electrically driven bow thruster. Galaxy Leader has two loading ramps. The stern ramp has a capacity of 120 tons. The second ramp with lower capacity is located midships on the starboard side. The ship has six decks, interconnected by ramps. The vehicle capacity is approximately 4,500 Car Equivalent Units.

== Construction, career, and ownership ==
The ship, assigned yard number 8213/1, was constructed at the Stocznia Gdynia shipyard in Gdynia, Poland, in 2002. Keel laying took place on November 5, 2001, and the launch occurred on May 18, 2002. The ship was completed on June 26, 2002. It is one of two identical ships; the sister ship is the Global Leader. Both ships are managed by STAMCO Shipmanagement in Piraeus, Greece.

The ship's registered owner is Galaxy Maritime Ltd., a company registered in the Isle of Man, and its flag state is the Bahamas; at the time of its seizure, the ship was chartered by the Japanese shipping company Nippon Yūsen K.K., which is also known as NYK Line. Galaxy Maritime Ltd. is owned by the Isle of Man shipping company Ray Car Carriers, of which the beneficial owners are Abraham (Rami) Ungar and Yael Ungar.

== Hijacking in 2023 ==
On November 19, 2023, Galaxy Leader was on a ballast voyage from Körfez, Turkey to Pipavav, India, when the Houthi hijacking took place near the Yemeni port city of Hodeidah. The Houthis have engaged in a series of attacks on commercial shipping in the Red Sea, which has impacted the global container shipping and marine insurance industries.

At least ten armed Houthi hijackers used a military helicopter to board the vessel. After seizing the vessel, they brought it to Hodeidah. Onboard Galaxy Leader were 25 crew members, including 17 from the Philippines; other crew members came from Bulgaria (including the captain and first mate), Ukraine, Mexico, and Romania. The maritime risk management firm Ambrey also described the hijacking as sophisticated and bearing the hallmarks of an Iranian-style operation. The Houthis video-recorded their attack and released the footage the next day, using the attack as propaganda.

An American defense official told the Associated Press in November 2023 that hijackers appeared to have been trained by a professional military, possibly Iran's. The Iranian government supports the Houthis, and the U.S. government said in December 2023 that the Iranian operational and intelligence assistance facilitated the Houthis' attacks on commercial vessels in the Red Sea. The Iranian government denied involvement.

The hijacking of Galaxy Leader, as well as a spate of Houthi drone and missile attacks on merchant shipping in the Bab-el-Mandeb strait passing into the Red Sea, threatened global shipping routes. This prompted the creation, in December 2023, of Operation Prosperity Guardian, a multilateral operation of ten nations to protect shipping in the area. The effort, which is under the auspices of the Combined Task Force 153, is led by the United States Navy, with the participation of the Royal Navy, Bahrain, Canada, France, Italy, Netherlands, Norway, Seychelles, and Spain.

== Crew hostages ==
Houthis held the 25 crew members as hostages, consisting of 17 Filipinos, two Bulgarians, three Ukrainians, two Mexicans, and one Romanian. Filipino foreign affairs official Eduardo de Vega stated, in March 2024, that he does not expect the hostages to be released until the war in Gaza is over.

The Houthis turned the ship into a tourist attraction. After the ship was seized and brought to Hodeidah, Yemeni visitors were brought (via motor boat) to Galaxy Leader for tours; some took selfies as rifle-toting Yemenis patrolled the deck, and Yemeni social media influencers danced on board the ship. Pro-Hamas graffiti was also scrawled on the ship. The Houthis also used the ship as a set for a propaganda music video (entitled "Axis of Jihad"), in which Houthi poet Issa al-Laith appears on deck and sings "Death to America and hostile Zion/ By God, we shall not be defeated!"

Galaxy Maritime repeatedly called for release of its 25 crew members, saying that they "have no connection whatsoever" to the ongoing Gaza war, and that "Nothing can be achieved by their further detention." The ship owner also said that the crew members had been allowed "modest contact" with their families and were being treated "as well as can be expected in the circumstances". At an assembly of the International Maritime Organization (IMO), the United States, the Bahamas, and Japan condemned the hijacking of Galaxy Leader as well as other Houthi acts that threatened freedom of navigation. The countries called for the unconditional release of the vessel's captain and crew. The U.S. Department of State said that the seizure was "a flagrant violation of international law".

On January 22, 2024, IMO Secretary General Arsenio Dominguez gave an opening address to the 10th Session of the IMO Sub-Committee on Ship Design and Construction (SDC), repeating his calls for the immediate release of Galaxy Leader and its crew. Satellite imagery revealed that, in late February or early March 2024, the ship was brought closer to Hodeidah, being moved from 2 km (1.2 mi) offshore to about 500 m (1,600 ft) from the port.

By March 2024, the crew had been held hostage for more than a hundred days; the Philippines Department of Foreign Affairs said there was no indication that the Houthis planned to release the crew. A Houthi spokesman, Nasr Al-Din Amer, claimed that the Houthis had "no claims of our own regarding this vessel" and that the release of the ship and hostages relied on the decision-making of Hamas and the Al-Qassam Brigades. A team from the International Committee of the Red Cross visited Galaxy Leader's crew for the first time on May 12, 2024.

On January 22, 2025, during the Israel–Hamas ceasefire, the Houthis released the hostages to Oman, according to Al-Masirah. An Omani Royal Air Force jet that entered Yemen earlier that day took off around an hour before the announcement. The Bulgarian Ministry of Foreign Affairs and Filipino President Bongbong Marcos confirmed the crew's release.

== 2025 airstrikes ==
On March 16, 2025, Houthi media reported that the United States Air Force bombed the command area of the bridge during its March 2025 attacks on the Houthis.

On April 28, Houthi-linked news outlet Al-Masirah reported that three US airstrikes hit the ship.

On July 6, the vessel was attacked by Israel. According to Israel, Houthis installed a radar system on the ship that is being used to track vessels in international maritime space. In photos taken April 30, 2026, the ship is partially sunk by the stern and bow is pointing skyward near the beach.

== See also ==
- Houthi involvement in the Israel–Hamas war
- 2023 in piracy
- US–UK airstrikes on Yemen
