= James J. Unger =

American debater (1942–2008)

- Born: January 28, 1942 (age 84); Cleveland, Ohio
- Died: April 3, 2008
- Education: Harvard Law School
- Alma mater: Boston College
- Scientific career
- Institutions: American University; Georgetown University

James John Unger (January 28, 1942 – April 3, 2008) was the premier coach, teacher and theorist of intercollegiate policy debate in the United States during the 1960s through the 1980s.

== Early years and education ==
James Unger, a native of Cleveland, Ohio, was a champion debater at St. Ignatius High School, where he was coached by Rev. John Miday (a member of the National Forensics League Hall of Fame). He reached the quarterfinals at the NFL national tournament in policy debate. Unger attended Boston College, reaching the final round of the college National Debate Tournament and graduating valedictorian in 1964.

He began coaching college debate teams, including the Boston College team, while he was a student at Harvard Law School, where he received his J.D. degree in 1967.

== Career ==
From 1968 until 1983, Unger was the debate coach at Georgetown University. During these years, annual coaches' polls ranked Unger's Georgetown teams first in the nation in five different years (1973: Bradley Ziff & Stewart Jay; 1975: Bradley Ziff & Thomas Rollins; 1977: John Walker & David Ottoson; 1978: Thomas Rollins & David Ottoson; 1980: James Kirkland & John Thompson), second once (1976: Thomas Rollins & John Walker), and third once (1973: Jeff Ruch & Tom Devine). These rankings are the same now used to determine the winner of the Copeland Award in college debate—Unger's teams won this distinction five of the first eight years it was offered. The National Debate tournament now awards the Unger Prize to the coach of the Copeland Award winner. Unger's Georgetown debaters also won numerous individual awards at every national tournament, including three NDT top speaker awards (Rollins (twice); John Q. Barrett) and three NDT second speaker awards (Walker; Rollins; Barrett). In 1977, Unger's team of David Ottoson and John Walker won the National Debate Tournament (NDT), the national championship of college-level policy debate.

In a nationwide poll of leading intercollegiate debaters, coaches, and speech professionals, Unger was named the Outstanding Debate Coach of the 1970s, his student Rollins was voted the Outstanding Debater of the 1970s and Unger was voted the Outstanding Debate Judge of the 1970s.

Following his years at Georgetown, Unger was the debate coach at American University.

Unger's influence on the stylistic and academic structure of policy debate in the United States was even greater than is reflected by the competitive success of the teams he coached at Georgetown and American. For many years, Unger was the director of, as well as an instructor at, the Georgetown University summer institute for high school debaters. After leaving Georgetown, Unger created the National Debate Institute at American University. Through these institutes, on a cumulative basis, over ten thousand motivated and articulate high school students from throughout the nation were exposed directly to Unger's theories and practices.

Unger is associated most closely with the "policymaking" paradigm for evaluating academic debate. In contrast to other theoretical constructs (such as hypothesis testing or kritik), this view of debate asks whether the topic or resolution, as exemplified by a specific policy proposed by the proponent of the resolution, should be "adopted" or "implemented", most usually as a governmental policy. In Unger's view, the policymaking paradigm served to prepare high school and college debaters to serve as informed and effective constituents, advocates, and citizens.

In U.S. presidential election years, Unger served as a consultant and was widely quoted on the presidential and vice presidential candidate debates for NBC, ABC, the Associated Press and United Press International.

== Death ==
James Unger died on April 3, 2008, at his home in Washington, D.C. He was 66 years old. Hestruggled with epilepsy all his life; however no official cause of death is available for him.

== Publications ==
- Unger, James J. "A Conversation with Brian Lamb." (Interview). The Rostrum, Vol. 69, No. 10, June 1995, pp. 5-23. Full issue available.
