= Vengerov =

Vengerov (Russian: Венге́ров) is a Russian and Ukrainian surname derived from the word vengr (венгр), which means "Hungarian". It was given to the people who arrived from Hungary and their descendants, not necessarily of Hungarian origin. Alternative spellings include Vengerova, Vengerof, Vengerovsky, and Wengeroff. The name may refer to:

- Gennadi Vengerov (1959–2015), Russian actor
- Isabelle Vengerova (1877–1956), American musician
- Maxim Vengerov (born 1974), Russian-born Israeli violinist, violist, and conductor
- Pauline Wengeroff (1833–1916), Russian-Jewish German-language writer
- Semyon Vengerov (1855–1920), Russian literary historian
- Vladimir Vengerov (1920–1997), Russian film director
- Yury Vengerovsky (1941–2004), Ukrainian volleyball player
