= Ungar =

Ungar is a surname. Notable people with the surname include:

- Abraham "Rami" Ungar, Israeli billionaire
- Batya Ungar-Sargon (1981–), American journalist
- Benjamin (Benji) Ungar (1986–), American fencer
- David Ungar, American engineer
- Hermann Ungar (1893–1929), Bohemian writer of German language and officer in the Ministry of Foreign Affairs of Czechoslovakia
- Jay Ungar (1946–), American fiddler and composer
- Ruth Ungar (1976–), American musician and singer, The Mammals, daughter of Jay
- Sanford J. Ungar (1945–), American journalist and president of Goucher College
- Shmuel Dovid Ungar (1886–1945), Rav of Nitra, Slovakia
- Shmueli Ungar, American singer
- Simon Ungar (1864–1942), rabbi of the Osijek Jewish Community
- Stu Ungar (1953–1998), poker and gin rummy player
- Thomas Ungar (1931–2026), Austrian conductor, music educator and lecturer
- William Ungar (1913–2013), founder of the National Envelope Corporation

== See also ==
- Frederick Ungar Publishing Company, a New York publishing firm founded in 1940
- Ungar (grape), another name for the Hungarian wine grape Green Hungarian
- Unger
- Ungern
