= Irving Ungerman =

Canadian businessman (1923–2015)

Irving Ungerman (February 1, 1923 – October 27, 2015) was a Canadian businessman, sports promoter and a prominent member of the Toronto Jewish community.

== Early life ==
Ungerman was born to Jewish immigrants in Toronto, Ontario, Canada. His parents ran a series of businesses, starting with a small kosher butcher shop and culminating in large poultry and egg store. Ungerman learned to box as a teenager, and became a city boxing champion at the age of 15.

== Sports promoter ==
Ungerman made his name as boxing promoter and manager, becoming in 1973 the first person elected to the Canadian Boxing Hall of Fame. Ungerman instituted boxing on Canadian closed-circuit television in the early 1960s and was responsible for establishing Canada’s Friday Night at the Fights on commercial TV. In addition to the world of boxing, Ungerman served on the 1972 organizing committee that developed the inaugural hockey series between Team Canada and the Soviet National Team. And he was a key figure on the organizing committee responsible for bringing Major League Baseball to Toronto.

He was one of Canada's most ardent supporters of amateur and professional sport. He was inducted into the International Jewish Sports Hall of Fame. He managed and represented Canadian boxing champions George Chuvalo and Clyde Gray.

Ungerman has been a long-time supporter of numerous organizations throughout Ontario including the Salvation Army, Variety Village, the Reena Foundation, the Hospital for Sick Children and Mount Sinai Hospital as well as an active fundraiser and patron of the arts. He was also the director of the Santa Claus Parade.

Ungerman was awarded the Order of Ontario in 2000, which recognizes the highest level of individual excellence and achievement in any field.

== Legacy ==
In June 2015, Irving Ungerman's memoirs were published under the name "Think and Respect" - his personal motto. Ungerman died at the age of 92 in Toronto, Ontario on October 27, 2015 after suffering a stroke.
