= Abraham Ungar =

Israeli businessman

Rami Abraham Ungar
- רמי אונגר
- Born: 12 October 1946 (age 80); Tel Aviv, Mandatory Palestine
- Education: Law degree from Tel Aviv University
- Occupation: Businessman
- Known for: Importing automobiles, shipping, real estate
- Spouse: Yael Ungar
- Children: 2
- Parent: Shalom Ungar (father)

Abraham Ungar (Hebrew: רמי אונגר; born 12 October 1946) is an Israeli businessman.

== Biography ==
Abraham (Rami) Ungar graduated from Tel Aviv University with a degree in law in 1971. The following year, he founded Ray Car Ltd. Ungar is married to Yael, who is involved in his business endeavors. The couple has two sons and resides in Kfar Shmaryahu, a town in central Israel.

== Business career ==
Ungar's business career began in the late 1960s with a venture in importing air conditioning systems for trailers and caravans. He became the first Israeli importer of Autobianchi automobiles, later expanding to Lancia vehicles. In the early 1980s, Ungar entered into a partnership with Ezer Weizman, focusing on the importation of automobiles, shipping, and real estate. Ungar became a major figure in the Israeli automotive industry, acquiring rights for various brands including Daihatsu and Kia. His company, Ray Shipping, owned over 60 vessels by 2010, with a focus on automobile transportation. A shipping and construction magnate, he was listed by Haaretz in 2019 as one of the 20 richest men in Israel. Forbes Israel put his net worth at USD 3.25 billion in its 2022 list of 100 richest Israelis. Ungar is the partial owner of the vehicle carrier Galaxy Leader hijacked by Houthi militants in the Red Sea on November 19, 2023, during the Gaza war.

Ungar has been involved in legal disputes over the importation rights for Kia vehicles in Israel. A disagreement with Michael Levi, the previous Kia importer, was resolved in Ungar's favor in the 1990s.

Ungar holds significant real estate assets in Israel, Eastern Europe, and the United States. He is a founder of the "Fire" real estate fund, managed by Shlomo Grofman.

== Views and opinions ==
Politically, Ungar was associated with the Gil (Pensioners of Israel) party and developed connections with notable political figures. In 1984, he co-founded the Yahad (Together) party with Ezer Weizman, Benjamin Ben-Eliezer, and Shlomo Amar, serving as its treasurer. Ungar has made significant financial contributions to the party.

== Awards and honors ==
He received a honoris causa doctorate from the Nikola Vaptsarov Naval Academy, Bulgaria, in 2014. Ungar is a donor and hundreds of graduates work in his firms.
