= Ungerer =

Ungerer is a surname. Notable people with the surname include:

- Hilarios Karl-Heinz Ungerer (born 1941), German Bishop of the Free Catholic Church
- Joe Ungerer (1916–1990), American football player
- Tomi Ungerer (1931–2019), French writer and illustrator
- Werner Ungerer (1927–2014), German diplomat, rector of the College of Europe

Two Ungerer brothers assisted Jean-Baptiste Schwilgué (1776–1856) in the construction of the third Strasbourg astronomical clock.

== See also ==
- Tomi Ungerer Museum, a museum in Strasbourg, dedicated to the work of Tomi Ungerer
- Unger
