= Ungureni =

Ungureni is a placename given to the villages founded by Transylvanian shepherds, especially in Muntenia. It may refer to:

- Ungureni, Bacău, a commune in Bacău County, Romania
- Ungureni, Botoșani, a commune in Botoșani County, Romania
- Ungureni, a village in Brăduleț Commune, Argeș County, Romania
- Ungureni, a village in Valea Iașului Commune, Argeș County, Romania
- Ungureni, a village in Tătărăști Commune, Bacău County, Romania
- Ungureni, a village in Butimanu Commune, Dâmbovița County, Romania
- Ungureni, a village in Corbii Mari Commune, Dâmbovița County, Romania
- Ungureni, a village in Cornești Commune, Dâmbovița County, Romania
- Ungureni, a village in Dragomireşti Commune, Dâmbovița County, Romania
- Ungureni, a village in Ghercești Commune, Dolj County, Romania
- Ungureni, a village in Munteni Commune, Galați County, Romania
- Ungureni, a village in Dăneşti Commune, Gorj County, Romania
- Ungureni, a village in Cupșeni Commune, Maramureș County, Romania
- Ungureni, a village in Topana Commune, Olt County, Romania
- Ungureni, a village in Filipeștii de Târg Commune, Prahova County, Romania
- Ungureni, a village in Gherghița Commune, Prahova County, Romania
- Ungureni, a village in Vadu Săpat Commune, Prahova County, Romania
- Ungureni, a village in Nistorești Commune, Vrancea County, Romania
- Drăgăești-Ungureni, a village in Mănești Commune, Dâmbovița County, Romania
- Măneciu-Ungureni, a village in Măneciu Commune, Prahova County, Romania
- Ungureni (river), a tributary of the Geamărtălui in Olt and Dolj Counties, Romania
