= History of Europe =

The history of Europe can be traced back to the appearance of the first modern humans identified as ancestors of contemporary Europeans about 37,000 years ago during the Paleolithic. Early European Farmers migrating from Anatolia spread agriculture across the continent during the Neolithic (7000–2000 BC), a period that also included early metallurgy. Starting around 4000 BC, westward migrations of steppe pastoralists spread Indo-European languages. The rise of the city-states of ancient Greece defines the beginning of classical antiquity (c. 800 BC-AD 500). The Hellenistic period (323–30 BC) began with the death of Alexander the Great and ended with the Roman Empire's control of the entire Mediterranean basin. Christianity emerged under Roman rule in the 1st century AD. The Migration Period of the Germanic peoples began in the 4th century.

The abdication of the last Western Roman Emperor in 476 traditionally marks the beginning of the Middle Ages (c. 500–1500). While the Eastern Roman ("Byzantine") Empire with its capital in Constantinople continued for another 1000 years, the former lands of the Western Roman Empire fragmented into the barbarian kingdoms. During the Byzantine-Muslim wars for the Mediterranean beginning in the 7th century, the 8th-century Muslim conquest of the Iberian Peninsula established Al-Andalus. The Rome-based Latin Church proclaimed the King of the Franks, Charlemagne, as "Emperor of the Romans" in the early 9th century and increasingly competitive missionary efforts by the Latin West and Byzantines resulted in the division of the Slavic peoples between Latin and Cyrillic use. Under pressure from Norse and Magyar invasions, Charlemagne's divided empire evolved into the Kingdom of France and the Holy Roman Empire in the 10th century.

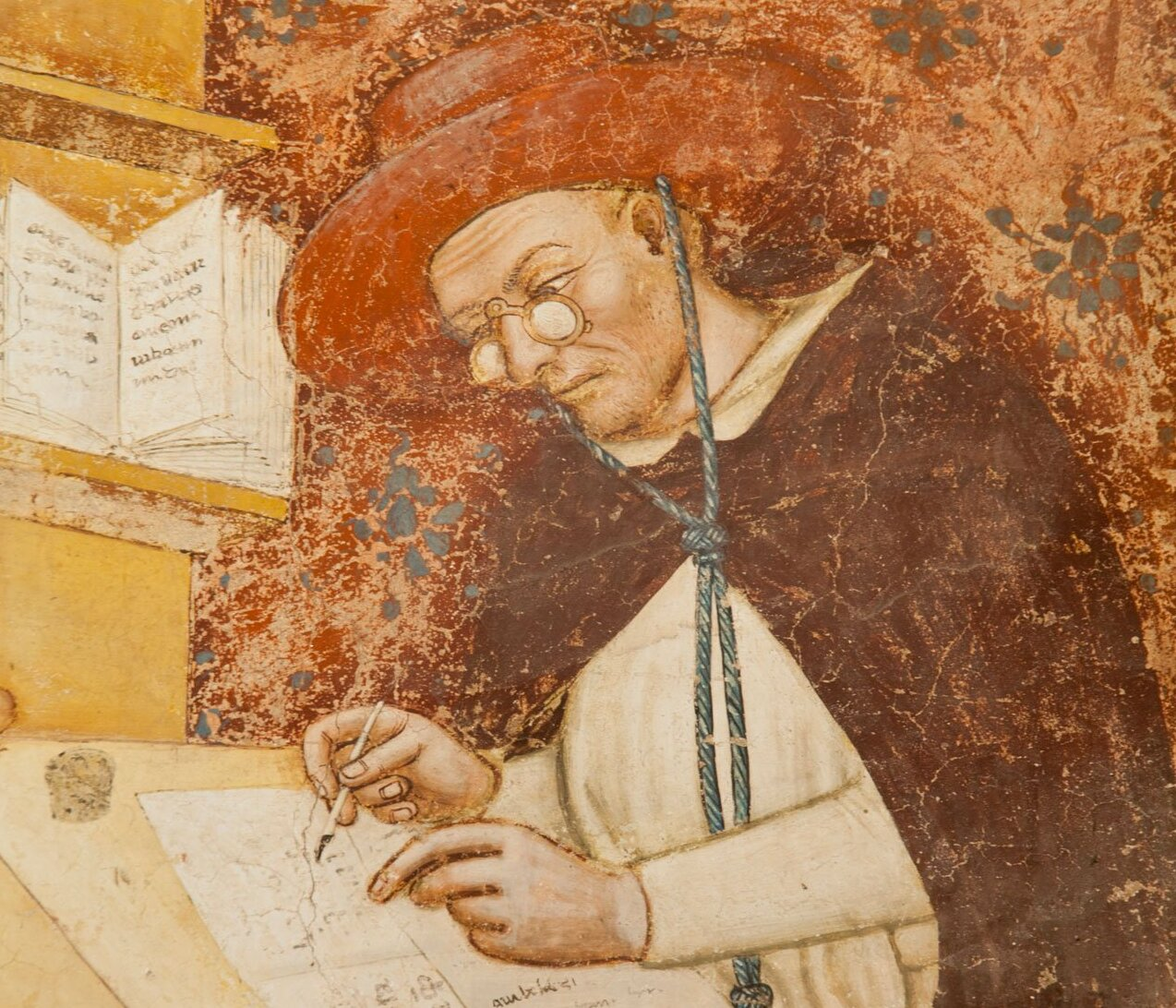
Detail of a portrait of Cardinal Hugh of Saint-Cher wearing spectacles (1352) (Note: The portrait was painted by Tommaso da Modena. Tommaso trained in Venice and worked mostly in Northern Italy.)

During the High Middle Ages (c. 1000–1300), the Latin Church split with the Eastern Orthodox Church, was convulsed by reform and entangled in conflict with secular monarchs, called for the Crusades, and provided key support for northern Italian city-states achieving independence from the Holy Roman Empire. The world's oldest continuously operating university was established in the 12th century amid a commercial revolution and rapid population and urban growth that continued until the end of the 13th century. Despite a decline in population caused by the Great Famine and the Black Death in the 14th century, 15th-century Europe experienced a cultural Renaissance as well as revolutions in both printing and seafaring. Printing changed how knowledge was created, preserved and disseminated while the Age of Discovery led to extensive colonization, the Atlantic slave trade and the Columbian exchange. The 16th-century Reformation challenged the hegemony of the Catholic Church and precipitated over a century of religious wars. With leadership from Italian astronomer Galileo Galilei and English mathematical physicist Isaac Newton, modern science emerged during the Scientific Revolution of the 17th century.

The Industrial Revolution and waves of liberal and nationalist upheaval shaped the long 19th century dominated by the five great powers of the Concert of Europe. Two rival military alliances fought World War I (1914–1918), which ended with multi-ethnic empires fragmented into nation states. Nazi Germany's invasion of Poland launched World War II (1939–1945), and as its armies overran Europe the regime systematically perpetrated the Holocaust. During the Cold War (1947–1991), Europe was divided between a U.S.-led Western bloc of countries and the NATO military alliance and the Soviet-led Eastern bloc and the Warsaw Pact. The Western bloc's colonial empires and remaining military dictatorships in Portugal, Greece and Spain were dismantled. After Soviet leader Mikhail Gorbachev refused to intervene militarily against democratic reforms in Poland and elsewhere, the Revolutions of 1989 led to all European communist states transitioning to market economies and then the Soviet Union itself dissolving. The European Union ("EU") was established in 1993. In the 21st century, most of the former communist states joined the EU and Europe faced the Euro area crisis (2009–2018) and the Russian invasion of Ukraine (2022–).

== Prehistoric Europe ==
Prehistoric Europe refers to the earliest era of human life in Europe predating any written records.

=== Paleolithic and Mesolithic ===
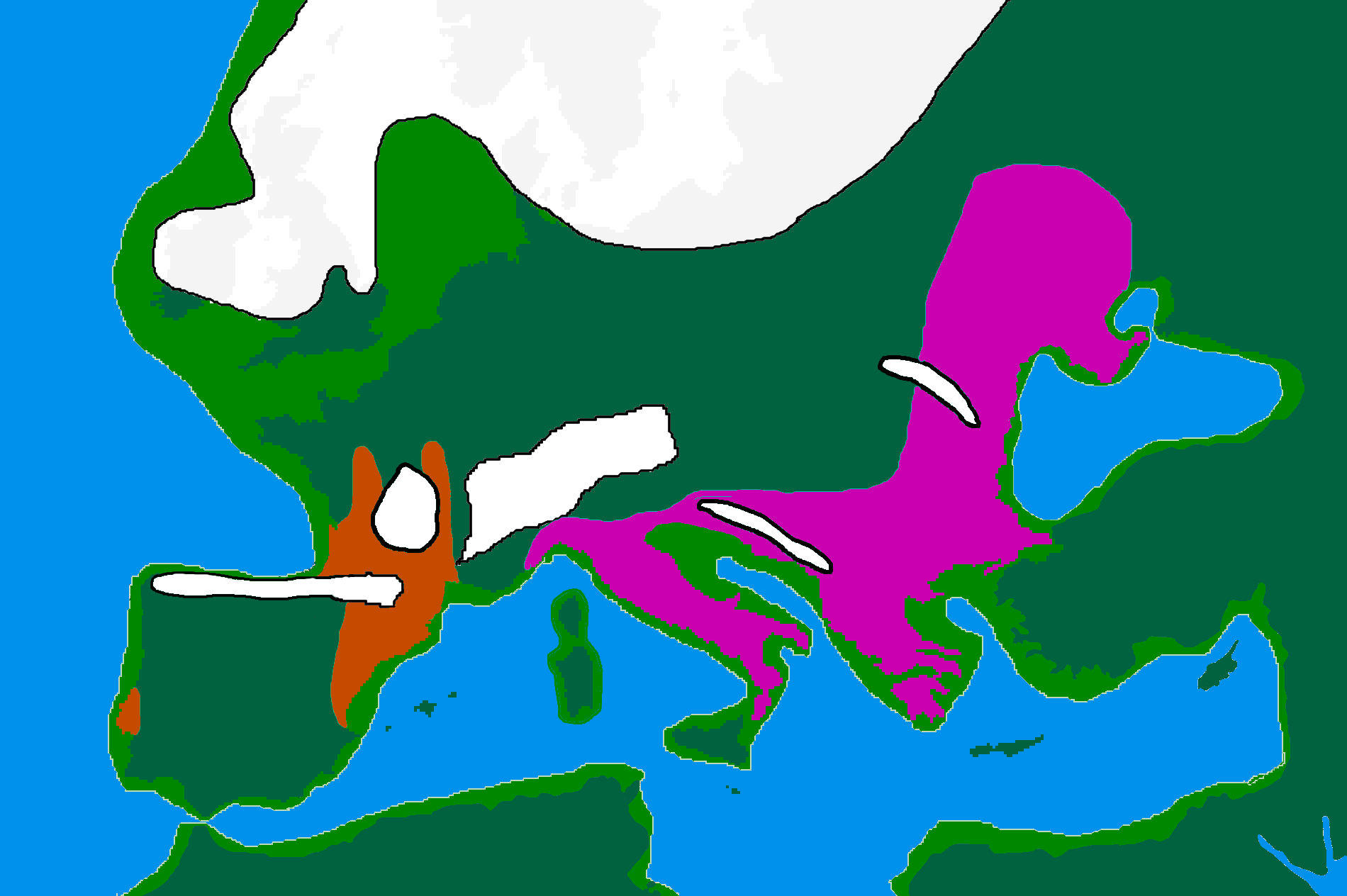
European LGM refuges, 20 kya Solutrean and Proto-Solutrean cultures Epi-Gravettian culture

The Paleolithic ("Old Stone Age") and Mesolithic ("Middle of Stone Age") eras in Europe were defined by a hunter-gatherer way of life and increasingly specialized stone tools. Kostenki 14, who lived in the Don River basin around 37,000 years ago, is among the earliest Europeans whose genome carries an ancestry signature recognizable in contemporary populations of the continent. (Note: Ancient DNA research indicates that the earliest modern humans in Europe during the Initial Upper Paleolithic (~50–40 kya) were part of the broader early expansion of Homo sapiens from Eurasia. Genetic data show that some early European individuals represent lineages (e.g. the Lincombian-Ranisian-Jerzmanowician) that left little or no detectable ancestry in later European populations.) The Last Glacial Maximum, roughly 27,000 to 19,000 years ago, pushed populations into southern refugia and may have reduced the human population of Europe to as few as 20,000 people. The Western Hunter-Gatherers, who would later dominate the continent and form one of the three main ancestral components of modern Europeans, (Note: Most Europeans can be modeled genetically as a mixture of Western hunter-gatherers, Early European Farmers, and Western Steppe Herders.) probably later expanded from southeastern Europe. By the late Mesolithic, the coastal foraging Ertebølle of southern Scandinavia (c. 5,400–3,950 BC) were one of the most complex hunter-gatherer cultures in Europe. (Note: The Ertebølle combined specialized fishing and hunting kits, pottery, shell-midden settlements, and a mix of year-round and seasonal occupation that gave them a semi-sedentary character even as many inland groups retained a more mobile, microlith-based way of life.)

=== Neolithic and Copper Age ===
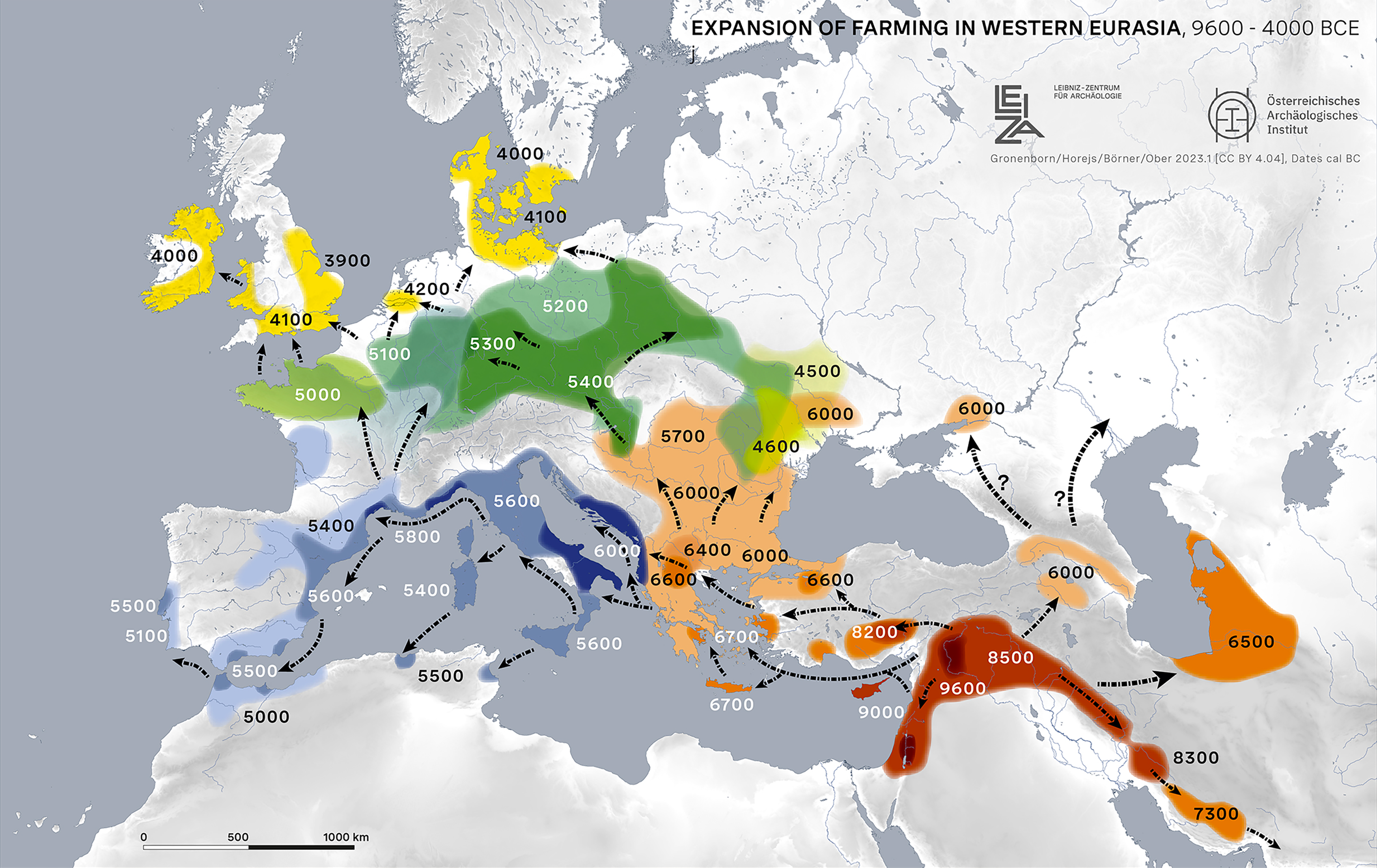
Neolithic expansion in Europe (7000–4000 BC)

Yamnaya culture (Note: "Yamnaya" (ямная) is a Russian adjective that means 'related to pits' (яма, yama). Steppe-derived populations such as the Yamnaya are thought to have brought lactase persistence to Europe and it is hypothesized that it may have given them a biological advantage over the European populations who lacked it.) (3300–2500 BC)

Indo-European migrations

Neolithic Europe emerged in the 7th millennium BC as the first permanent settlements – with houses, wells, granaries, and defensive structures – appeared in the Balkans. These settlements are linked to Early European Farmers migrating from Anatolia, the second main ancestral component (after the earlier Mesolithic Western hunter-gatherers) of contemporary Europeans. Three Balkan archaeological sites hold, respectively, the world's oldest securely dated evidence of high-temperature copper smelting (c. 5000 BC), the world's oldest gold artifacts (c. 4600 BC), and Europe's oldest urban center (c. 4700–4200 BC). Yamnaya pastoralists began expanding into Southeast Europe around 4200 BC but the main Indo-European migration came c. 3300–2600 BC, after which Indo-European languages spread across the continent.

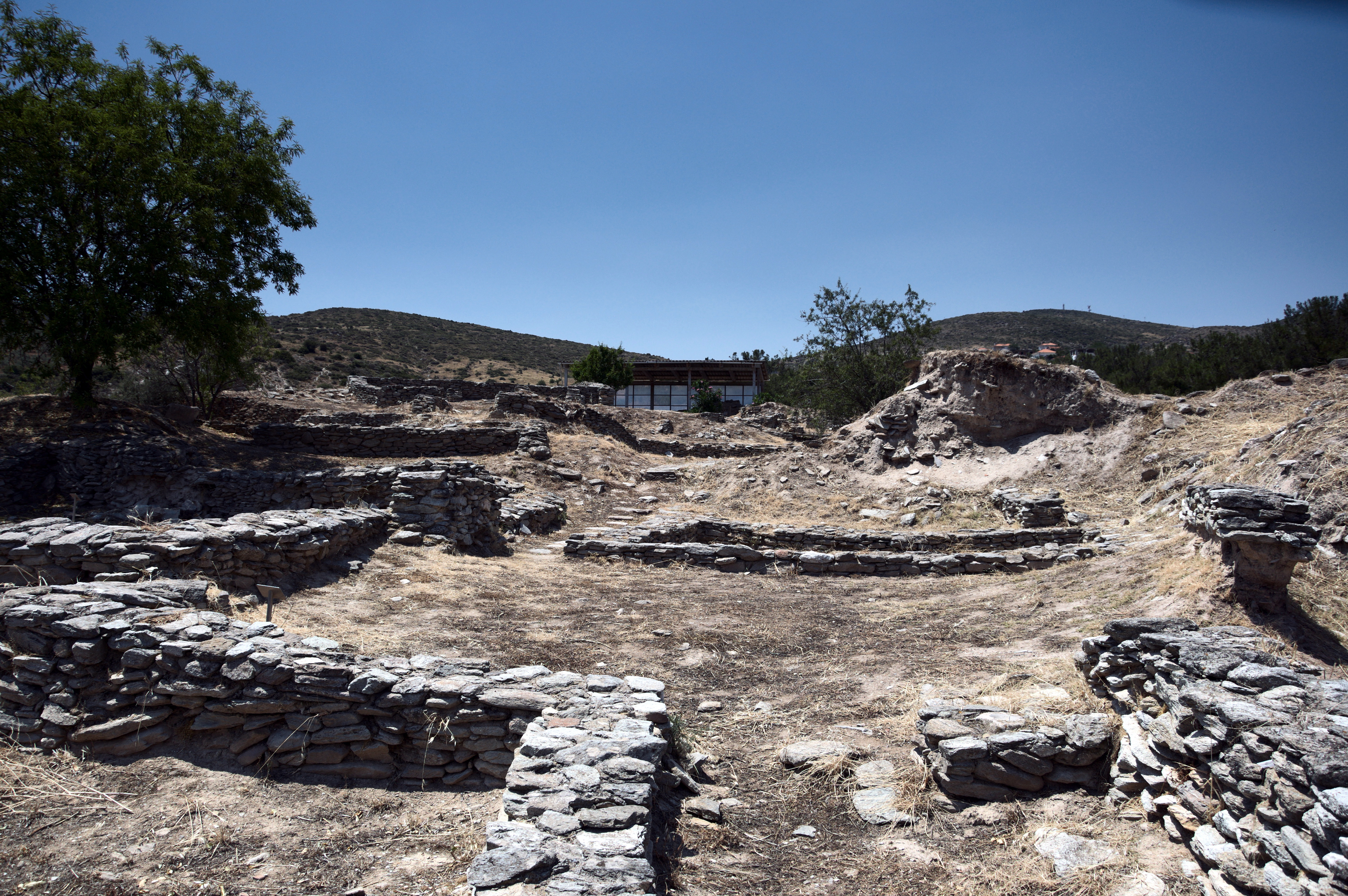
Neolithic settlement of Sesklo, Greece, c. 5900 BC

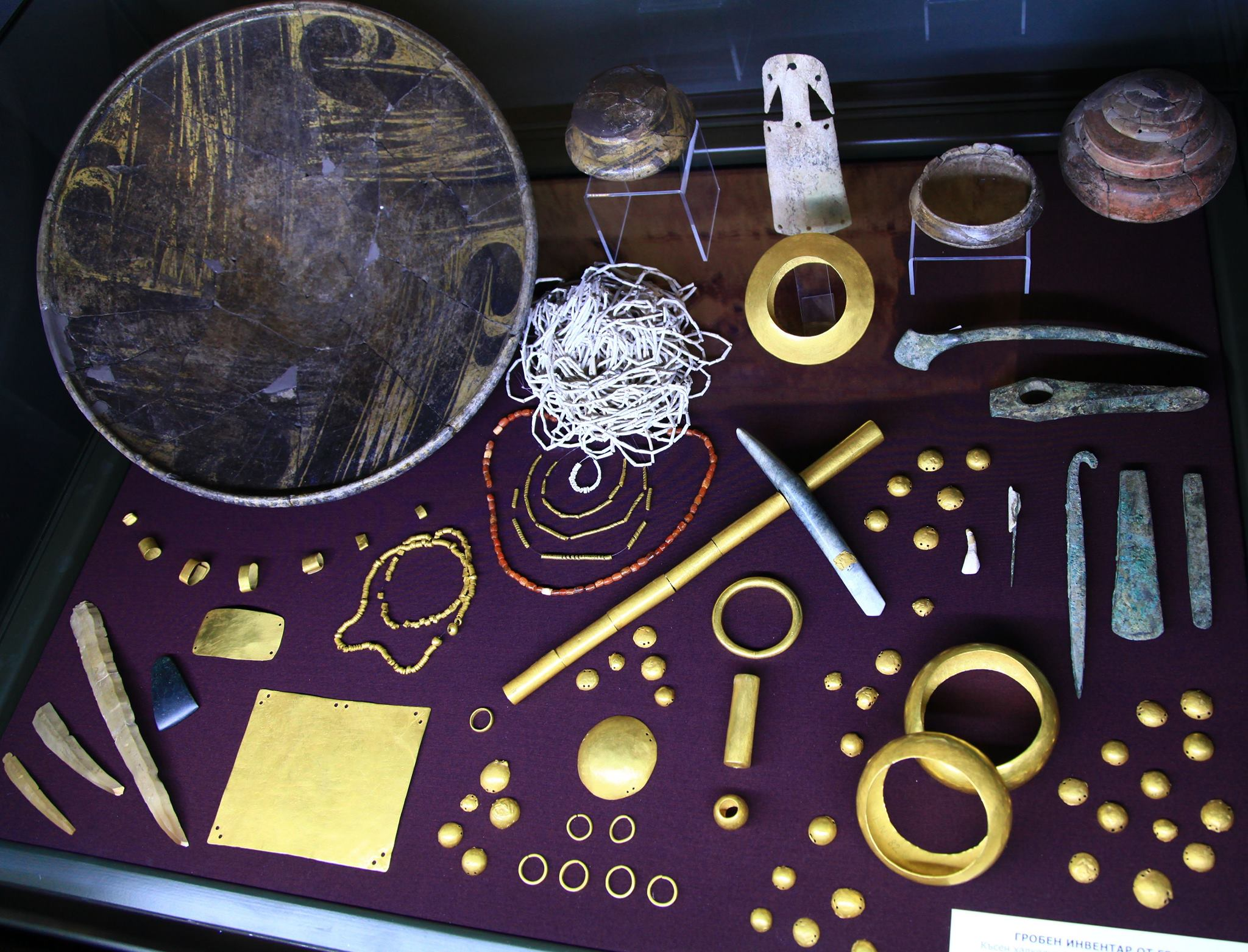
Varna necropolis artefacts, Bulgaria, c. 4500 BC

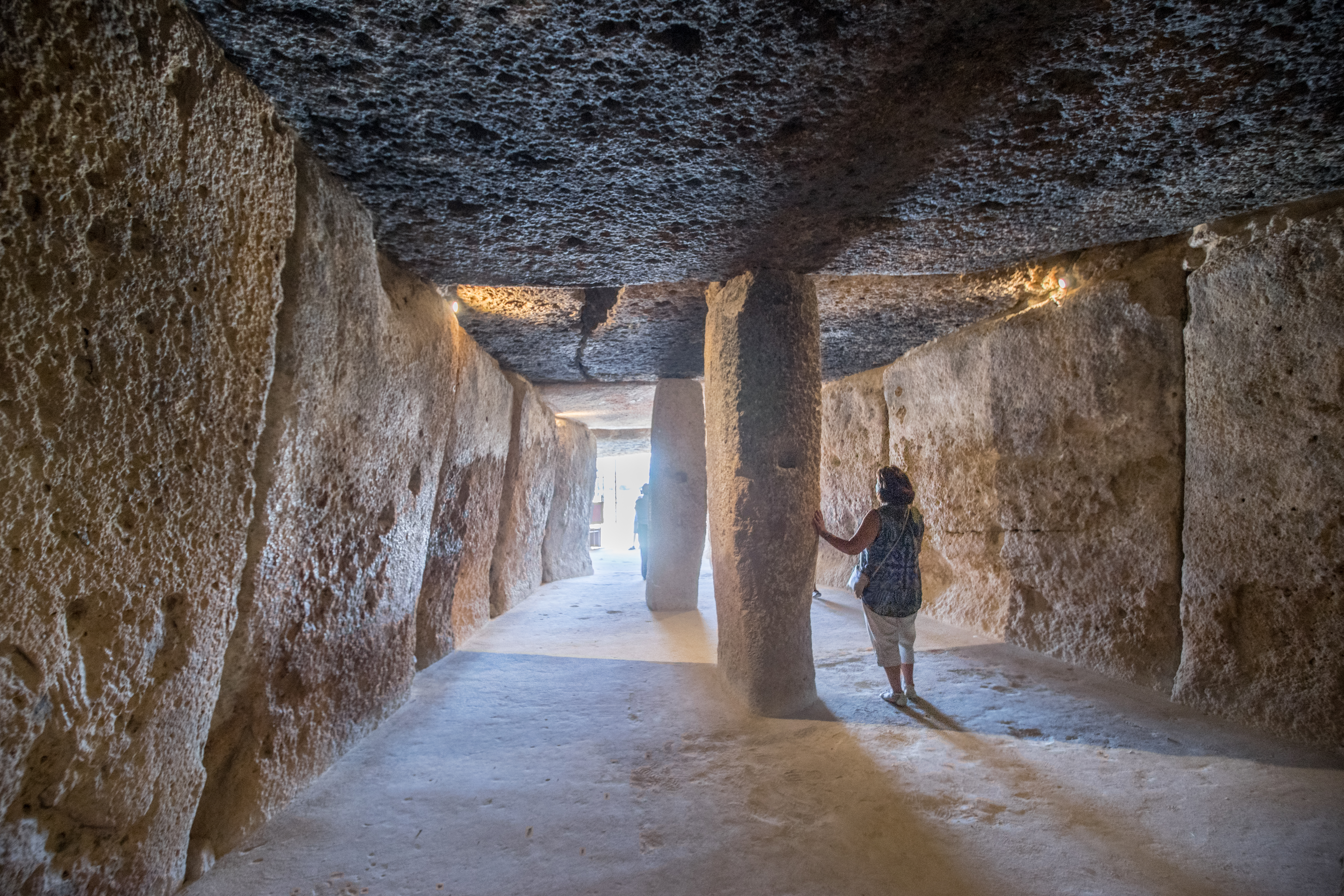
Menga Dolmen, Spain, c. 3700 BC

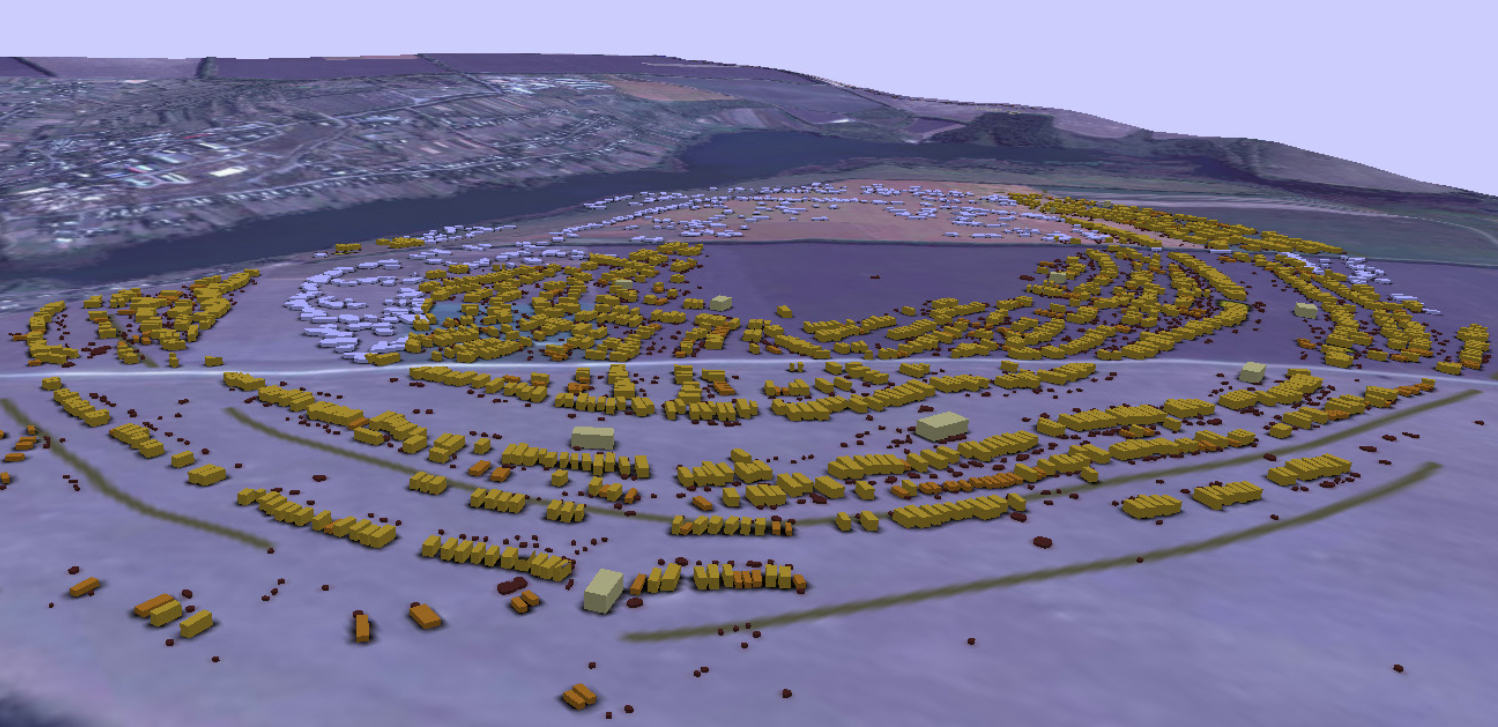
The city-like settlement of Maidanetske, Ukraine, c. 3700 BC, Cucuteni-Trypillia culture

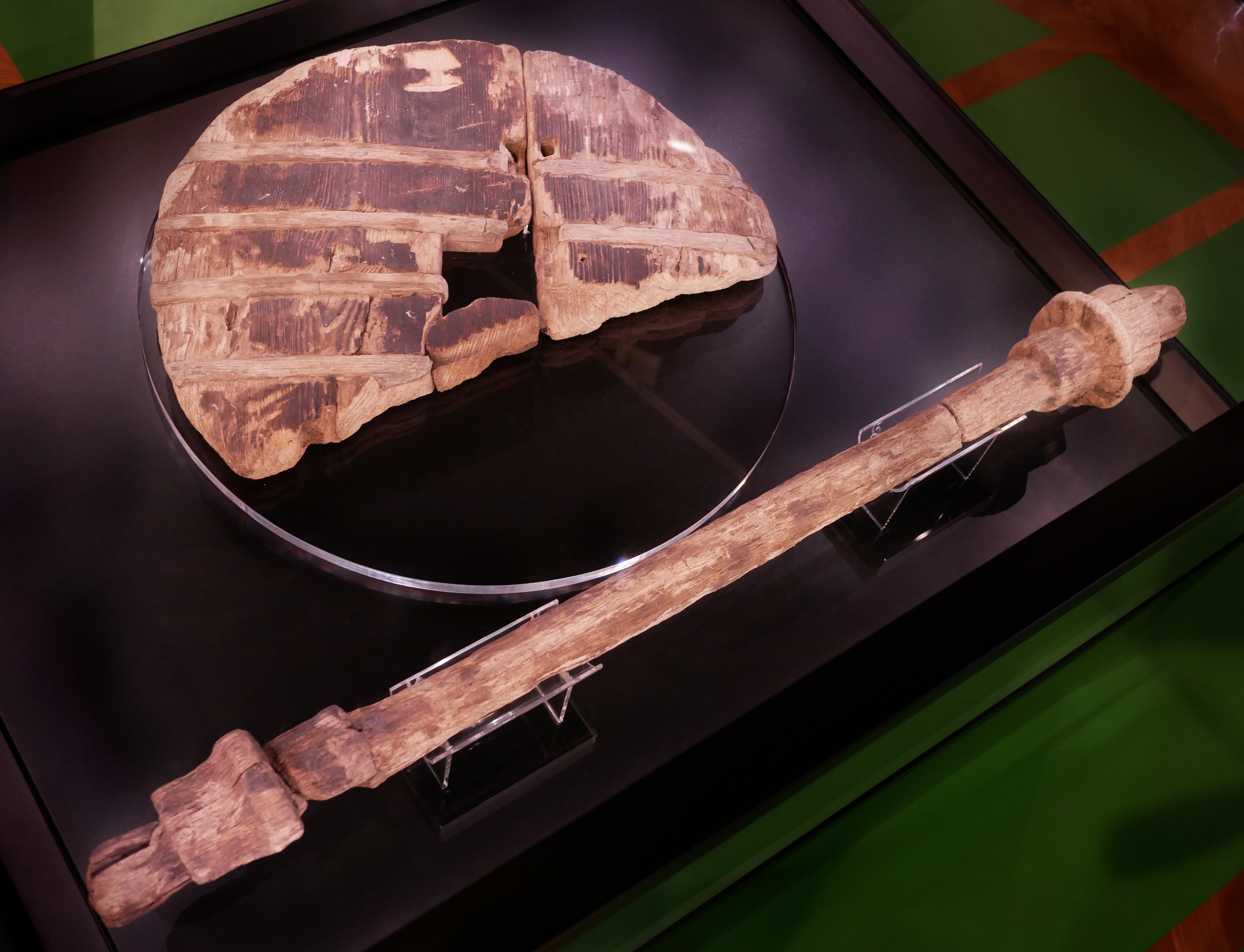
The Ljubljana Marshes Wheel, Slovenia, c. 3130 BC, the oldest transportation wheel with an axle ever discovered

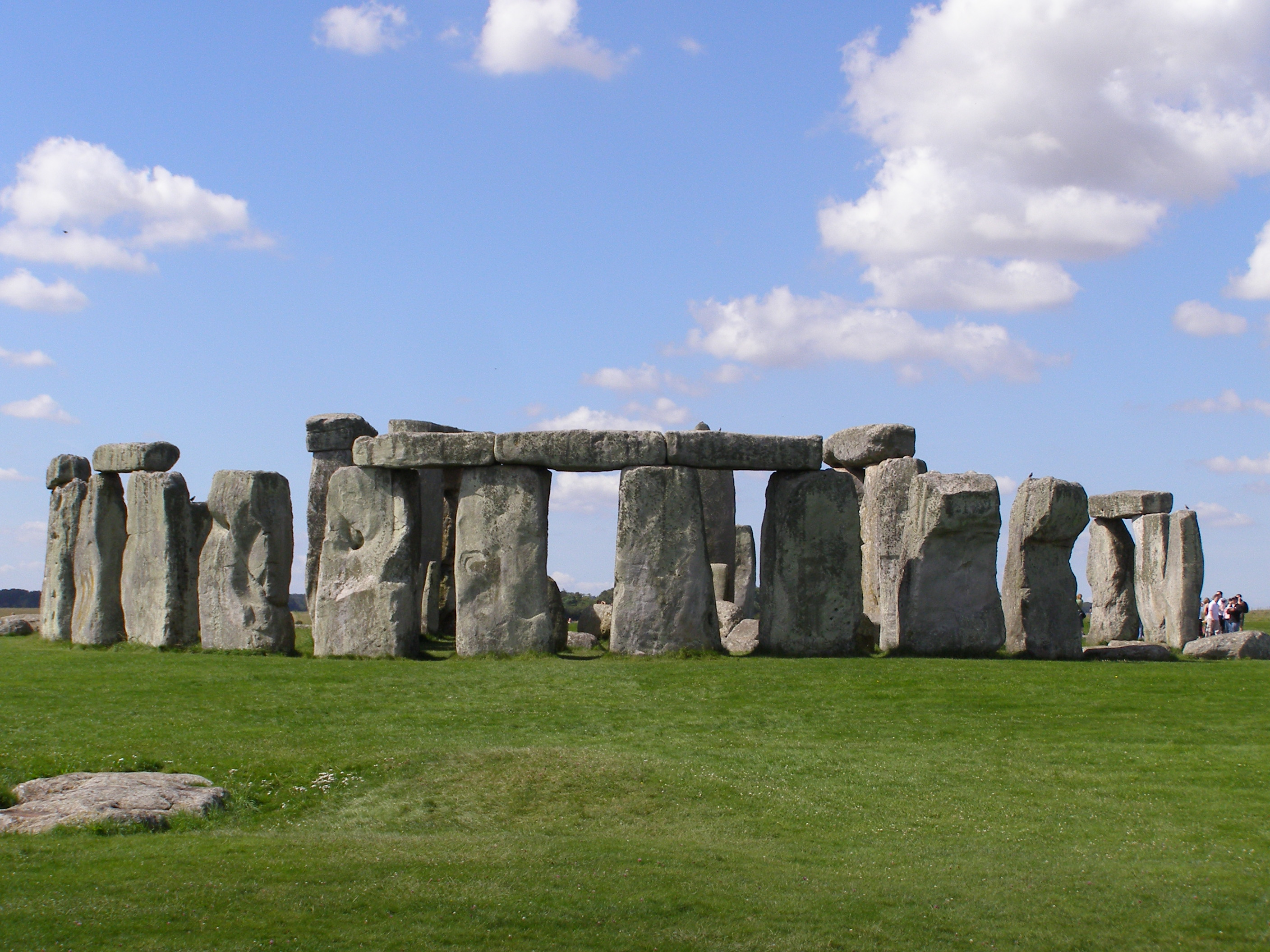
Stonehenge, Britain, c. 2500 BC

== Protohistoric Europe ==
=== Bronze Age ===
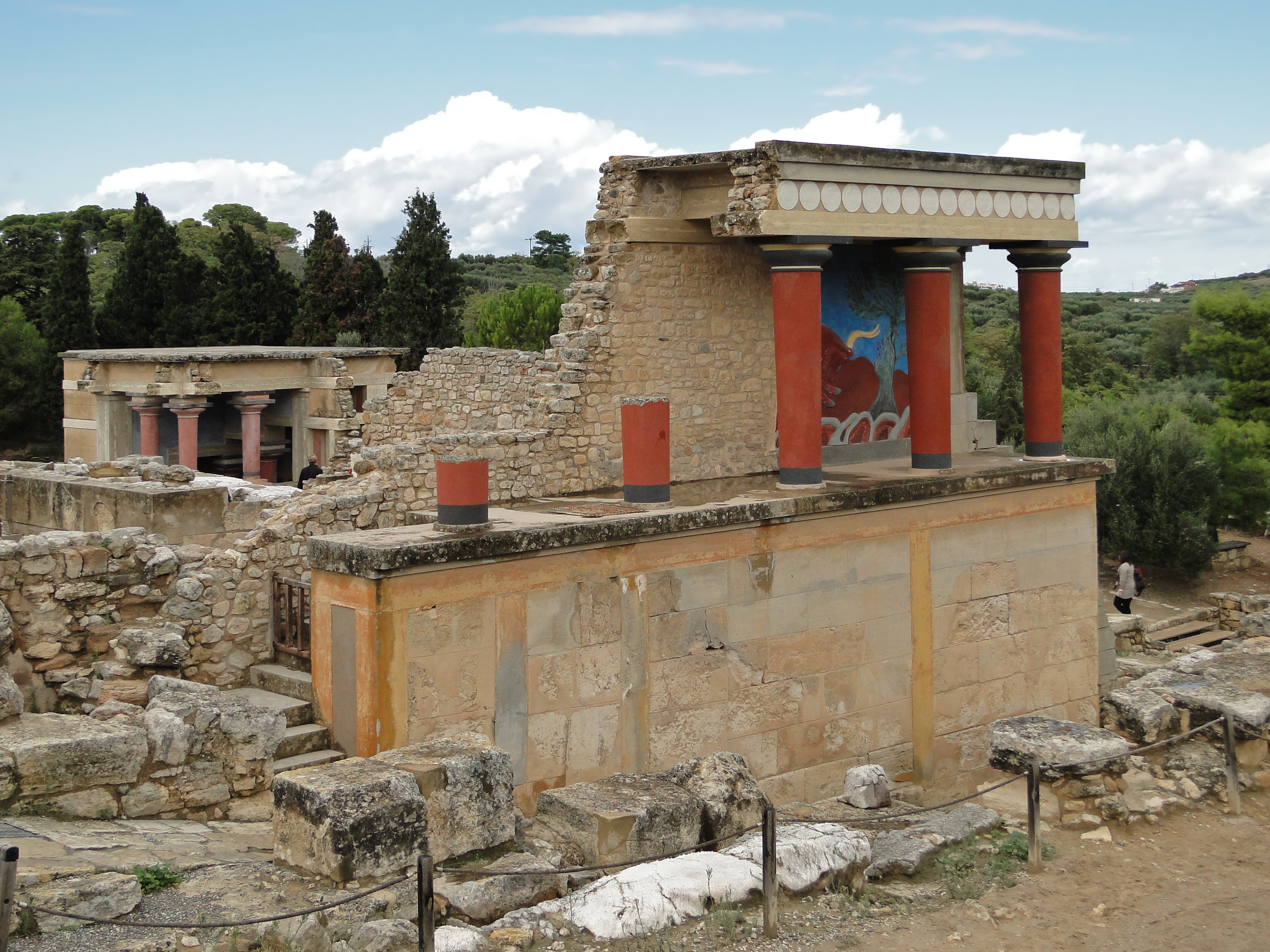
Partly reconstructed ruins of Knossos, Crete, c. 1700 BC

The first well-known literate civilization in Europe was the Minoan civilization that arose on the island of Crete and flourished from approximately the 27th century BC to the 15th century BC.

The Minoans were replaced by the Mycenaean civilization which flourished during the period roughly between 1600 BC, when Helladic culture in mainland Greece was transformed under influences from Minoan Crete, and 1100 BC. The major Mycenaean cities were Mycenae and Tiryns in Argolis, Pylos in Messenia, Athens in Attica, Thebes and Orchomenus in Boeotia, and Iolkos in Thessaly. In Crete, the Mycenaeans occupied Knossos. Mycenaean settlement sites also appeared in Epirus, Macedonia, on islands in the Aegean Sea, on the coast of Asia Minor, the Levant, Cyprus and Italy. Mycenaean artefacts have been found well outside the limits of the Mycenaean world.

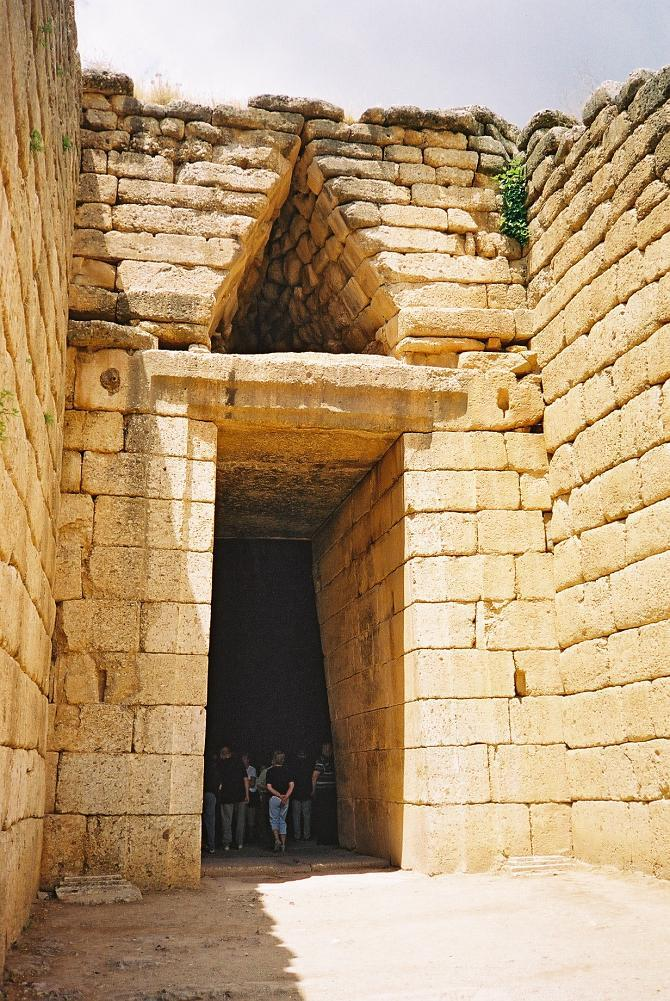
The Treasury of Atreus, Mycenae, Greece 1250 BC

Quite unlike the Minoans, whose society benefited from trade, the Mycenaeans advanced through conquest. Mycenaean civilization was dominated by a warrior aristocracy. Around 1400 BC, the Mycenaeans extended their control to Crete, the centre of the Minoan civilization. The Mycenaean civilization perished with the collapse of Bronze-Age civilization on the eastern shores of the Mediterranean Sea. The collapse has been variously attributed to Dorian invasion, natural disasters and/or climate change. Whatever the causes, the Mycenaean civilization had disappeared after LH III C, when the sites of Mycenae and Tiryns were again destroyed. This end, during the last years of the 12th century BC, occurred after a slow decline of the Mycenaean civilization, which lasted many years before dying out. The beginning of the 11th century BC opened a new context, that of the protogeometric, the beginning of the geometric period, the Greek Dark Ages of traditional historiography.

The Bronze Age collapse may be seen in the context of technological history that saw the slow spread of ironworking technology from present-day Bulgaria and Romania in the 13th and the 12th centuries BC.

The Tumulus culture and the following Urnfield culture of central Europe were part of the origin of the Roman and Greek cultures.

== Classical antiquity ==
Classical antiquity, also known as the classical era, classical period, classical age, or simply antiquity, is the period between the 8th century BC and the 5th century AD during which the interwoven civilizations of ancient Greece and ancient Rome, known together as the Greco-Roman world and centered on the Mediterranean Basin, flourished and influenced Europe, North Africa, and West Asia.

=== Ancient Greece ===
Reconstruction of Anaximander's 6th-century BC world map identifying the world's continents (Europe, Asia and Libya)

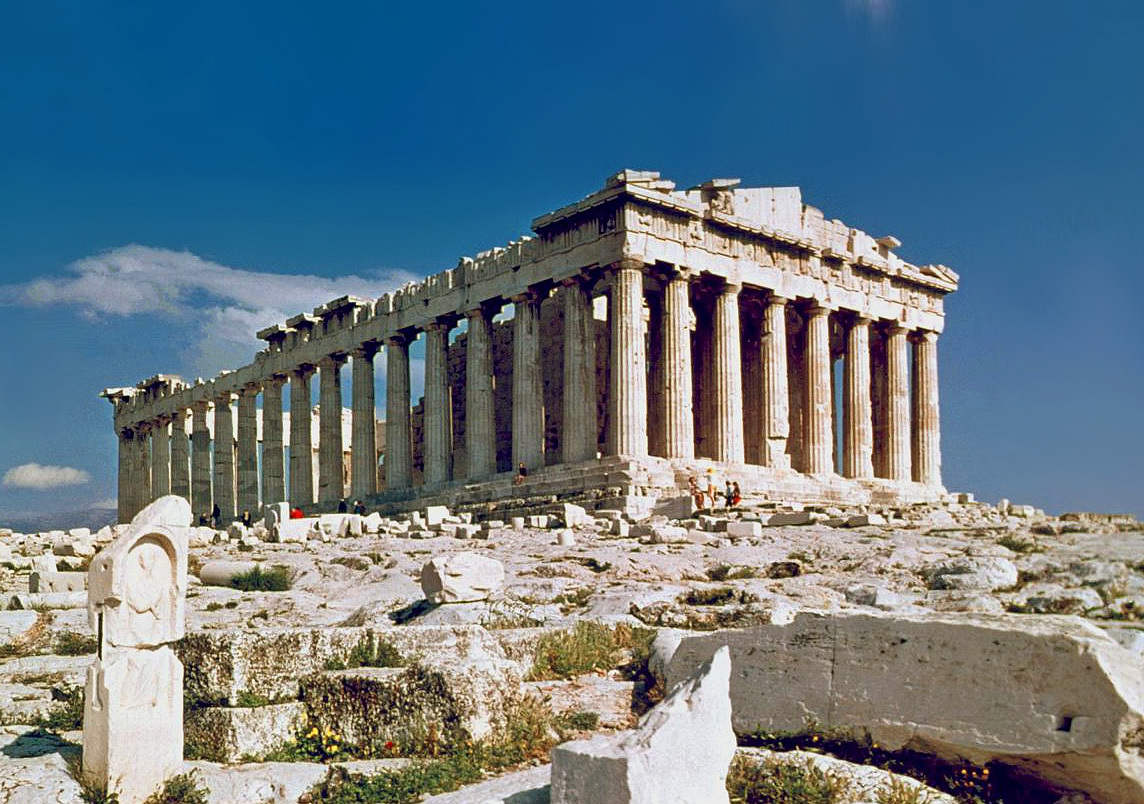
The Parthenon, Athens, constructed between 447 and 438 BC

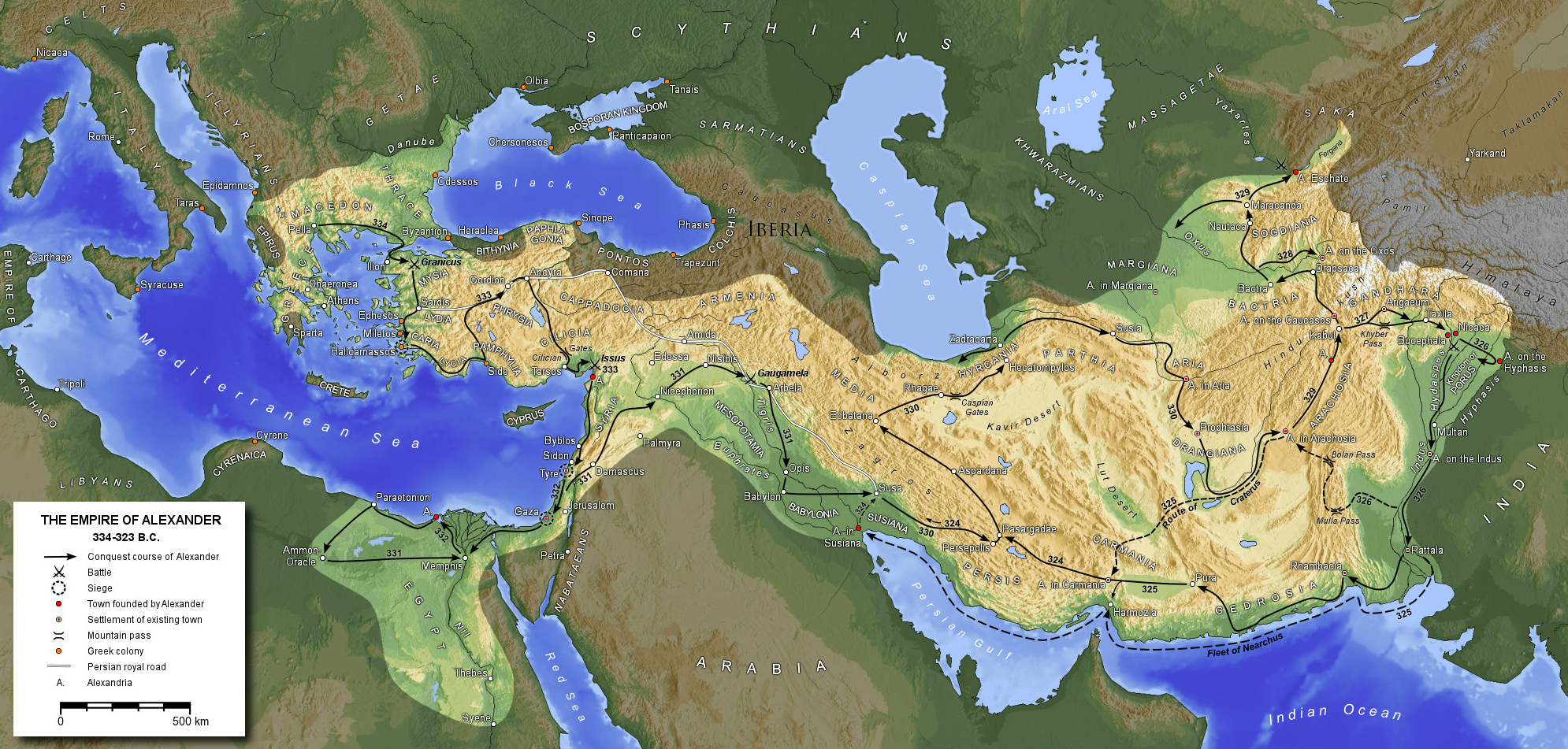
Empire of Alexander the Great (334-323 BC)

Ancient Greece (also "Hellenic civilisation") was a group of several hundred relatively independent but culturally and linguistically related city-states ("poleis") – including Athens, Sparta, Thebes, Corinth, and Syracuse – distinguished by remarkable accomplishments in architecture, philosophy, mathematics, sports, theatre and music. Athens governed itself with a form of direct democracy and by the late 4th century BC as many as half of the over one thousand existing Greek cities might have been democracies. Athens was the home of Socrates (c. 470–399 BC), Plato (c. 428–347 BC), the Platonic Academy, Aristotle (384–322 BC) and the Peripatetic school. Hellenic city-states established colonies on the shores of the Black Sea (Greek Crimea and Pontic Greeks) and Mediterranean (Anatolia, Sicily, and southern Italy) and also fought a half century of wars with the Persian Empire. (Note: During the 5th century BC, some of the Greek city states attempted to overthrow Persian rule in the Ionian Revolt, which failed. This sparked the first Persian invasion of mainland Greece. At some point during the ensuing Greco-Persian Wars, namely during the Second Persian invasion of Greece, and precisely after the Battle of Thermopylae and the Battle of Artemisium, almost all of Greece to the north of the Isthmus of Corinth had been overrun by the Persians, but the Greek city states reached a decisive victory at the Battle of Plataea. With the end of the Greco-Persian wars, the Persians were eventually forced to withdraw from their territories in Europe.)

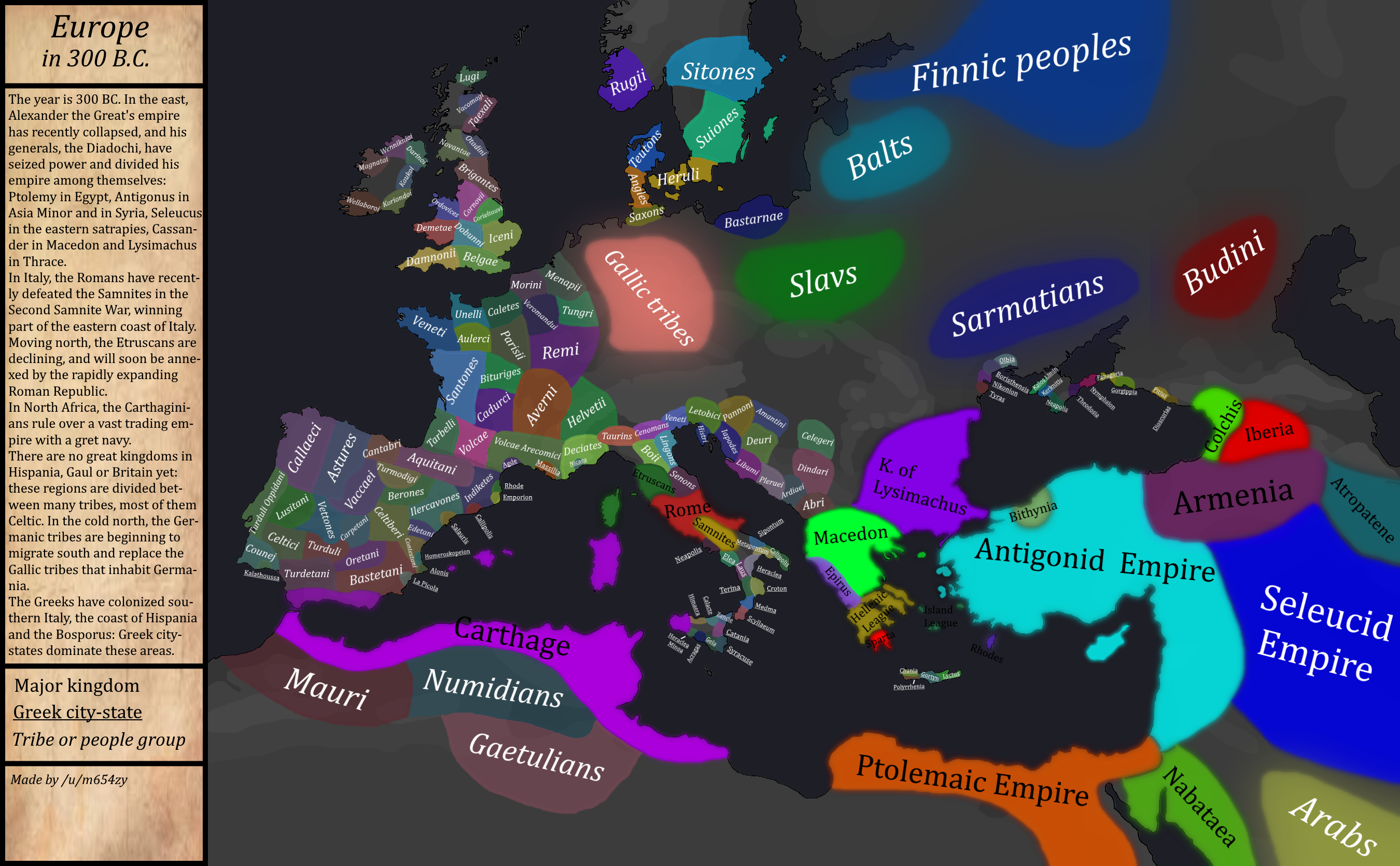
Europe (300 BC)

Hellenic infighting (Note: Some Greek city-states formed the Delian League to continue fighting Persia, but Athens' position as leader of this league led Sparta to form the rival Peloponnesian League. The Peloponnesian Wars ensued, and the Peloponnesian League was victorious. Subsequently, discontent with Spartan hegemony led to the Corinthian War and the defeat of Sparta at the Battle of Leuctra.) left Greek city states vulnerable, and Philip II of Macedon (r. 359–336 BC) united the Greek city states under his control. His son, Alexander the Great (r. 336–323 BC), conquered Egypt and Persia and going as far off as India. During the Hellenistic period (323–30 BC) following the death of Alexander and the wars between his generals, the resulting Ptolemaic, Seleucid, and Macedonian kingdoms spread Greek culture to regions as far away as Bactria. In the newly founded city of Alexandria, Euclid's (fl. 300 BC) Elements revolutionized geometry and has been referred to as the most successful textbook ever written and second only to the Bible in the number of editions that have been published. The Syracusan mathematician, physicist, astronomer, engineer and inventor Archimedes (c. 287–c. 212 BC) is considered one of the greatest mathematicians of all time (Note: The Fields Medal for outstanding achievement in mathematics (the "Nobel Prize" for math) features a portrait of Archimedes, along with a carving illustrating his proof on the sphere and the cylinder. The inscription around the head of Archimedes is a quote attributed to 1st century AD poet Manilius, which reads in Latin: Transire suum pectus mundoque potiri ("Rise above oneself and grasp the world").) as well as the father of mathematical physics.

=== Ancient Rome ===
Beginning in the 3rd century BC, the Roman Republic fought a series of major wars against the Phoenician colony of Carthage which established Roman dominance over the western Mediterranean. In the Macedonian Wars, the Romans turned their attention to the eastern Mediterranean, defeating and absorbing Hellenistic states and assimilating Greek culture. (Note: The assimilation was uneven.) First governed by kings, then as a senatorial republic, Rome was transformed into an empire at the end of the 1st century BC after Julius Caesar's (r. 49–44 BC) military seizure of power ended republican rule, enabling Augustus (r. 27 BC-AD 14) and his authoritarian successors. During the reign of the early emperors, Christianity emerged in the Roman province of Judaea as a movement centered on the 1st-century Jewish preacher and religious leader Jesus of Nazareth (c. 6 BC-AD 33) and spread through the empire's cities over the following centuries despite periodic persecution. During the two-century Pax Romana, the Roman Empire became the only state in history to encircle the entire Mediterranean, spanning three continents from the Atlantic to the Persian Gulf. (Note: Under Trajan (r. 98 to 117), the Roman Empire reached its maximum expansion, controlling approximately 5,900,000 km^{2} (2,300,000 sq mi) of land surface, including Italia, Gallia, Dalmatia, Aquitania, Britannia, Baetica, Hispania, Thrace, Macedonia, Greece, Moesia, Dacia, Pannonia, Egypt, Asia Minor, Cappadocia, Armenia, Caucasus, North Africa, Levant and parts of Mesopotamia.)

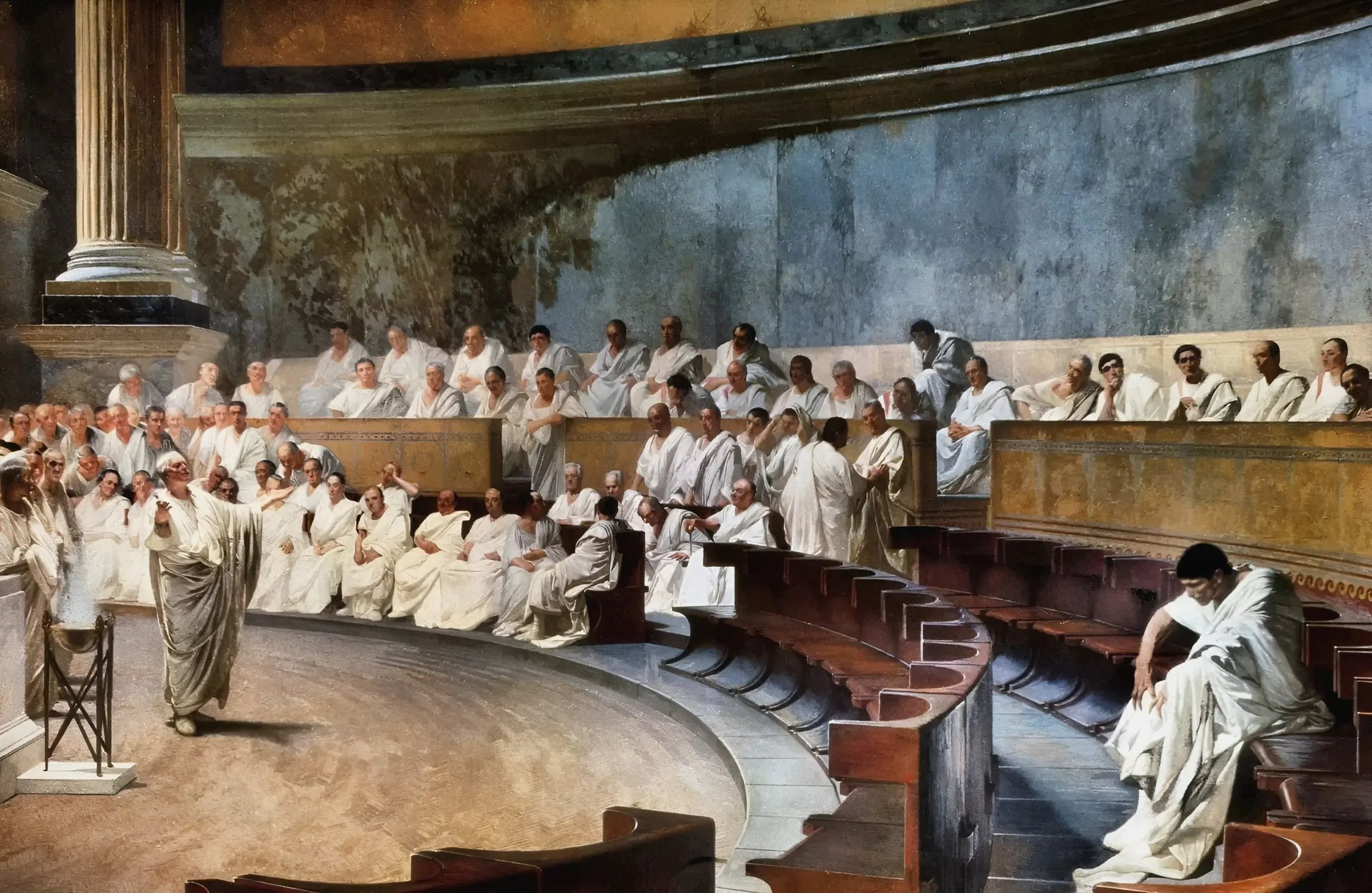
Cicero addresses the Roman Senate to denounce Catiline's conspiracy to overthrow the Republic, by Cesare Maccari.

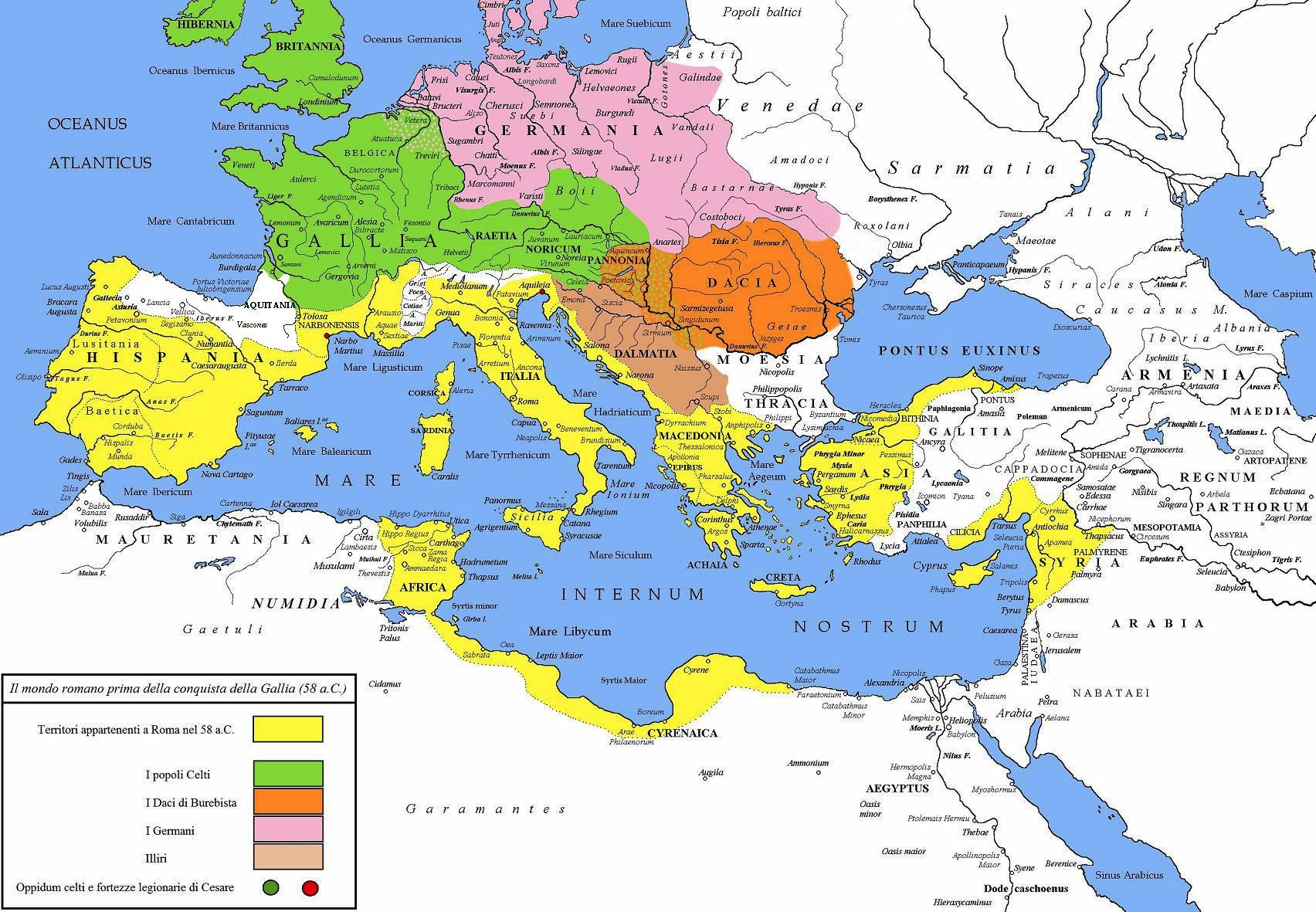
The Roman Republic (58 BC)

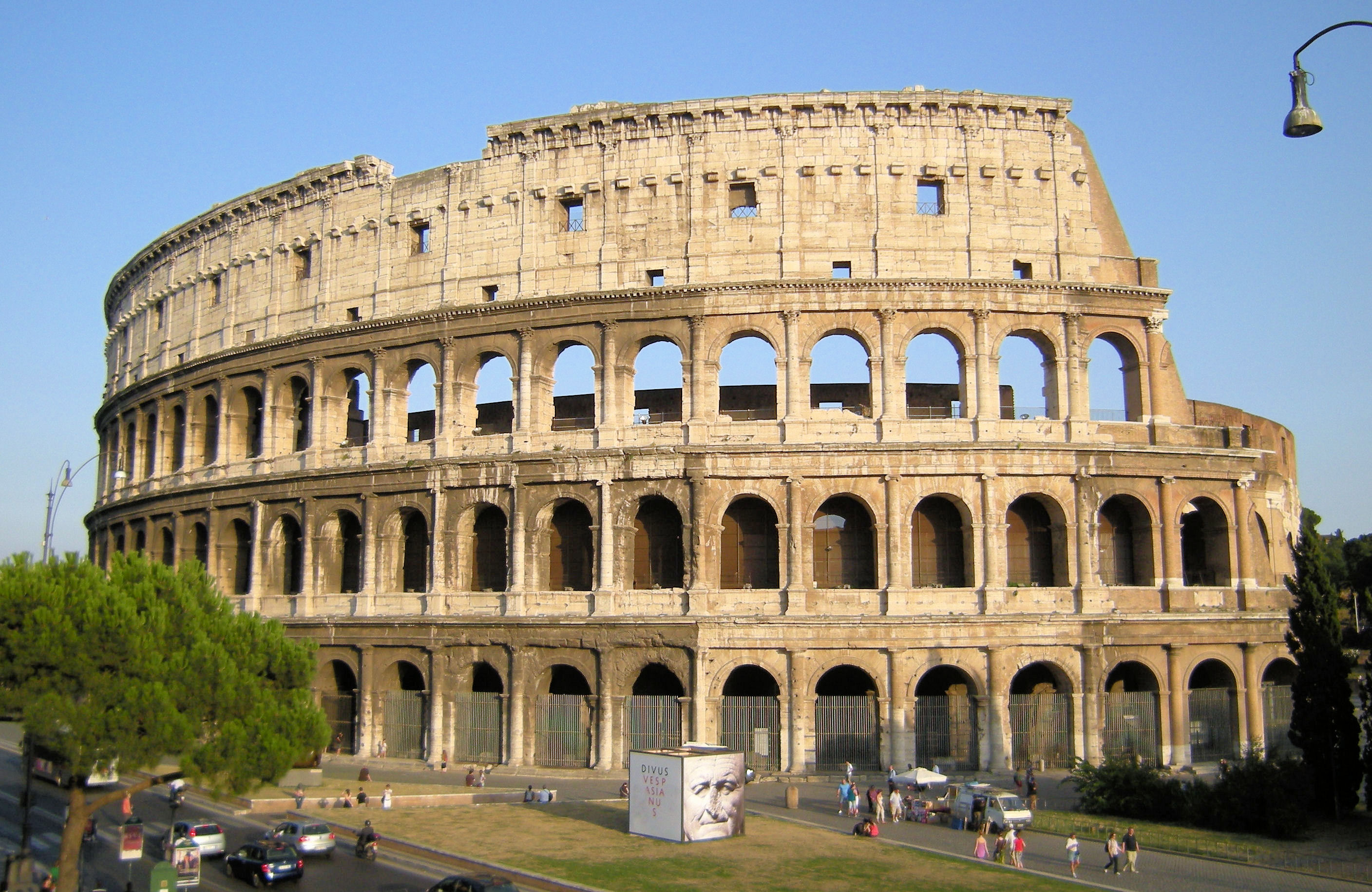
The Colosseum, Rome, constructed between 72 and 80 AD

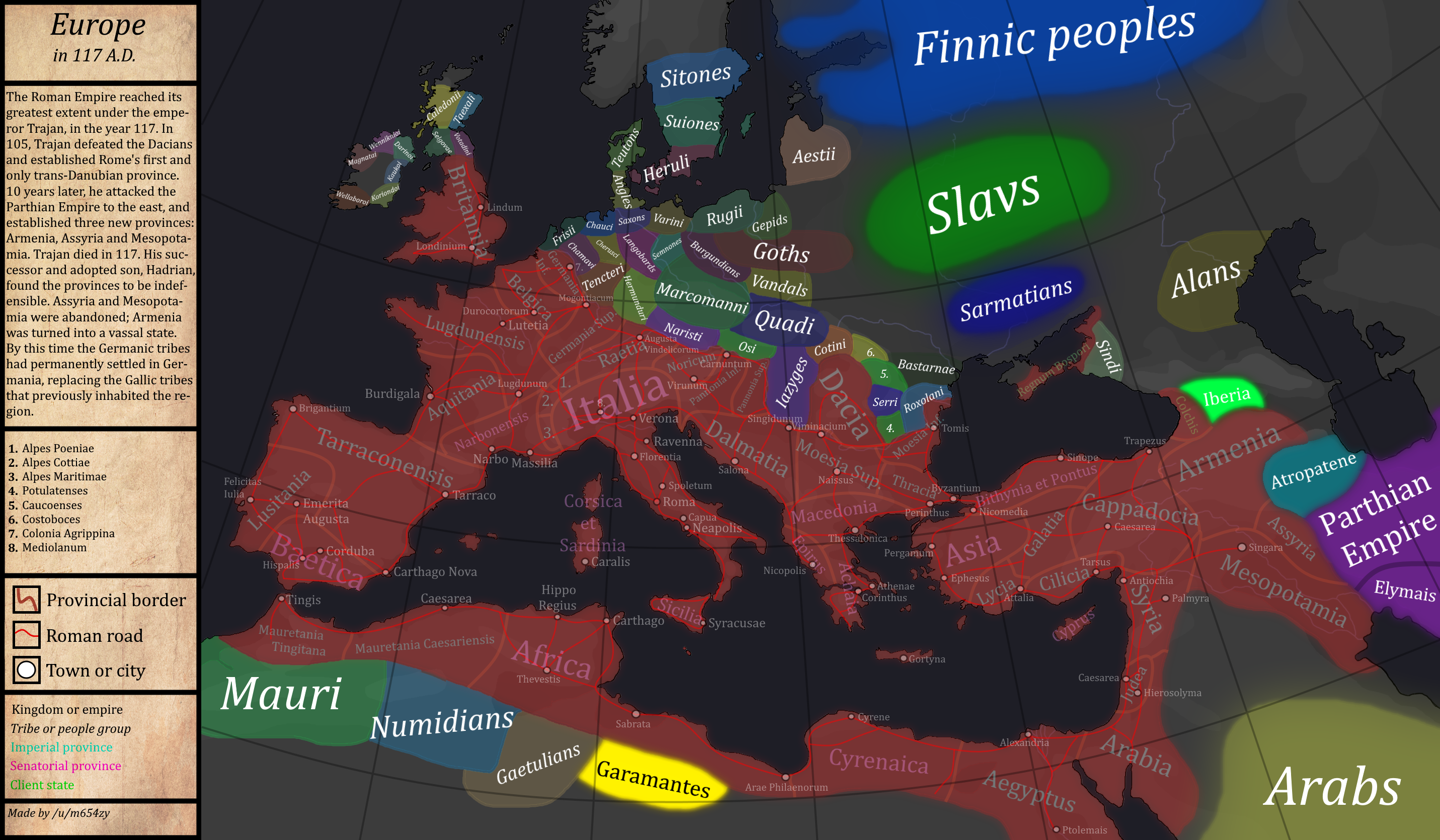
The Roman Empire at its greatest extent (117 AD)

In the 3rd century, barbarian invasions and a series of civil wars undermined the Empire. The emperors Diocletian (r. 284–305) and Constantine (r. 306–337) split the empire into a Western and an Eastern part with the capital in the Greek city of Byzantium, renamed Nova Roma in 330 (marking the conventional start of the Byzantine Empire) and later as Constantinople ("City of Constantine"). Constantine declared an official end to state-sponsored persecution of Christians in 313 and convened the council that standardized the doctrines ("Nicene Christianity") still followed by most Christian churches today. Following the catastrophic Roman defeat by the Goths at Adrianople (378), Theodosius I (r. 379–395) made Nicene Christianity the official religion of the Roman Empire in 381. Amidst constant conflicts with Hunnic, (Note: The Hunnic leader Attila (r. 434–453) attempted to conquer Roman Gaul (modern France), crossing the Rhine and marching as far as Aurelianum (Orléans), before being stopped in the Battle of the Catalaunian Plains (451). He invaded Italy in 452 but withdrew after meeting with Pope Leo I.) Germanic, (Note: The Vandals sacked Rome in 455.) Slavic and other "barbarian" tribes (see: Migration Period), fifth-century emperors specifically assigned authority over the territories of the Western Empire to the bishop of Rome. In 476 the Western Empire fell when its last emperor surrendered to a barbarian king.

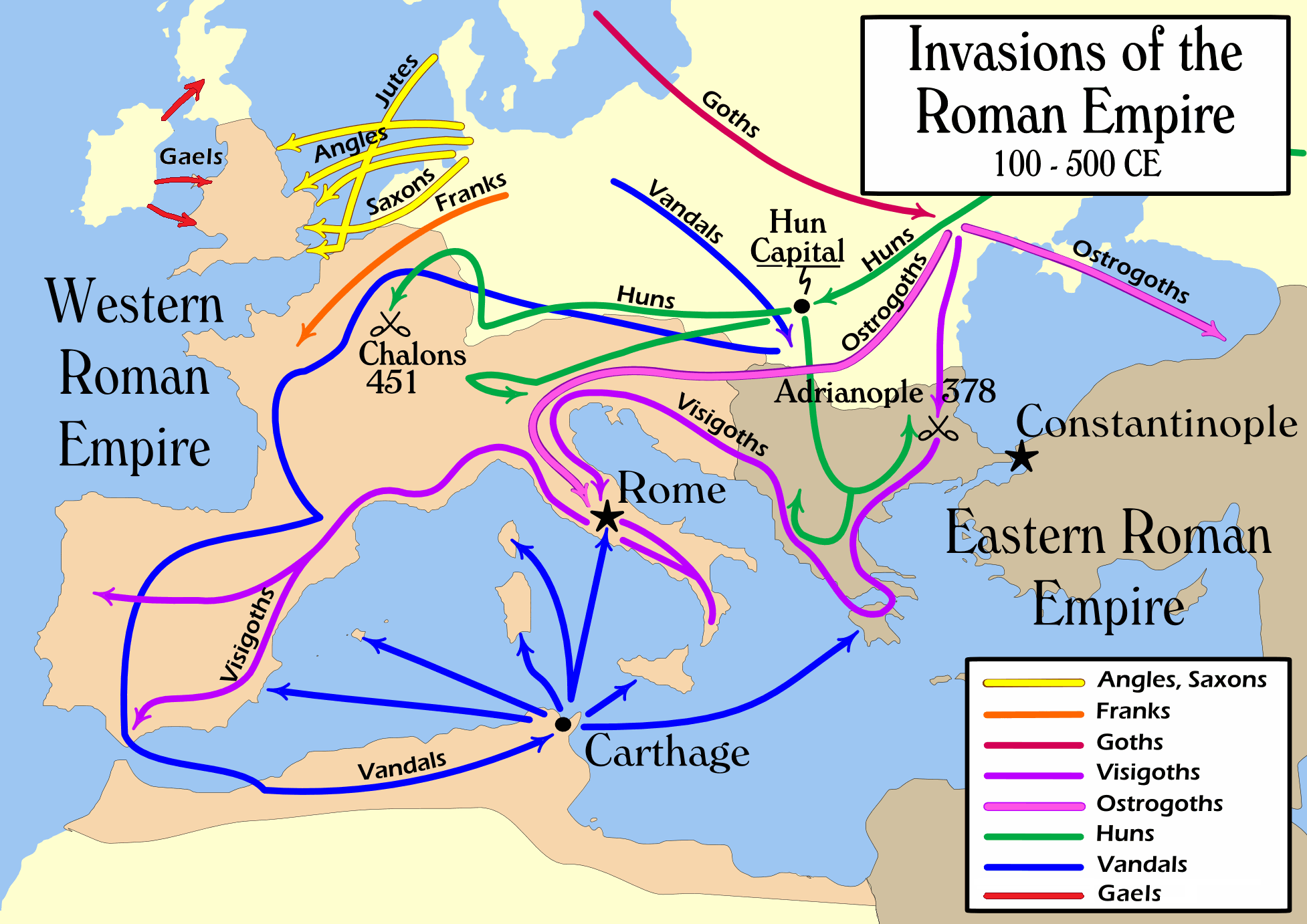
Invasions of the Roman Empire from the 2nd to the 5th century

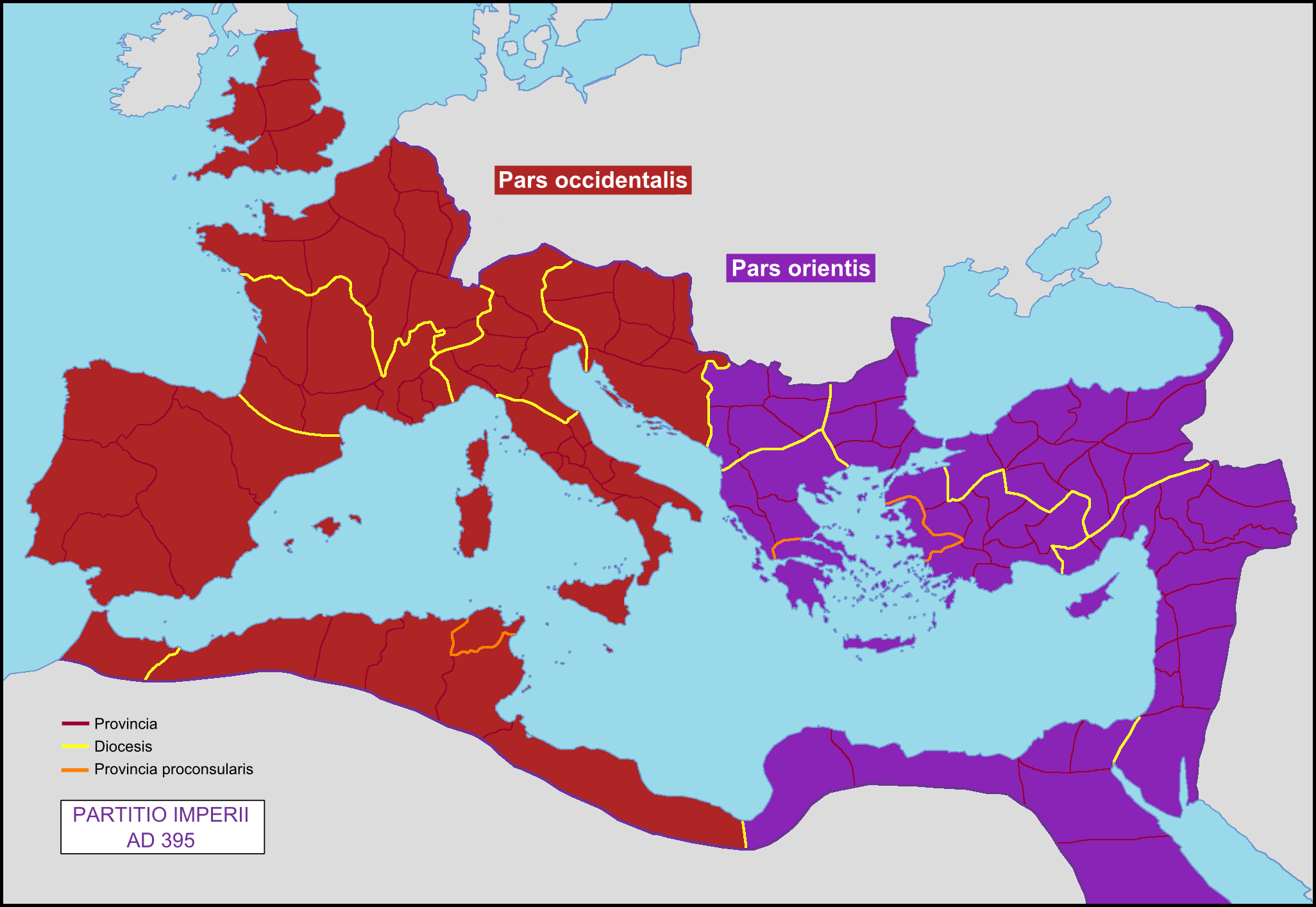
Partition of the Roman Empire (395): the Western Roman Empire is in red and the Eastern ("Byzantine") in purple

== Post-classical and medieval Europe ==
=== Early Middle Ages ===
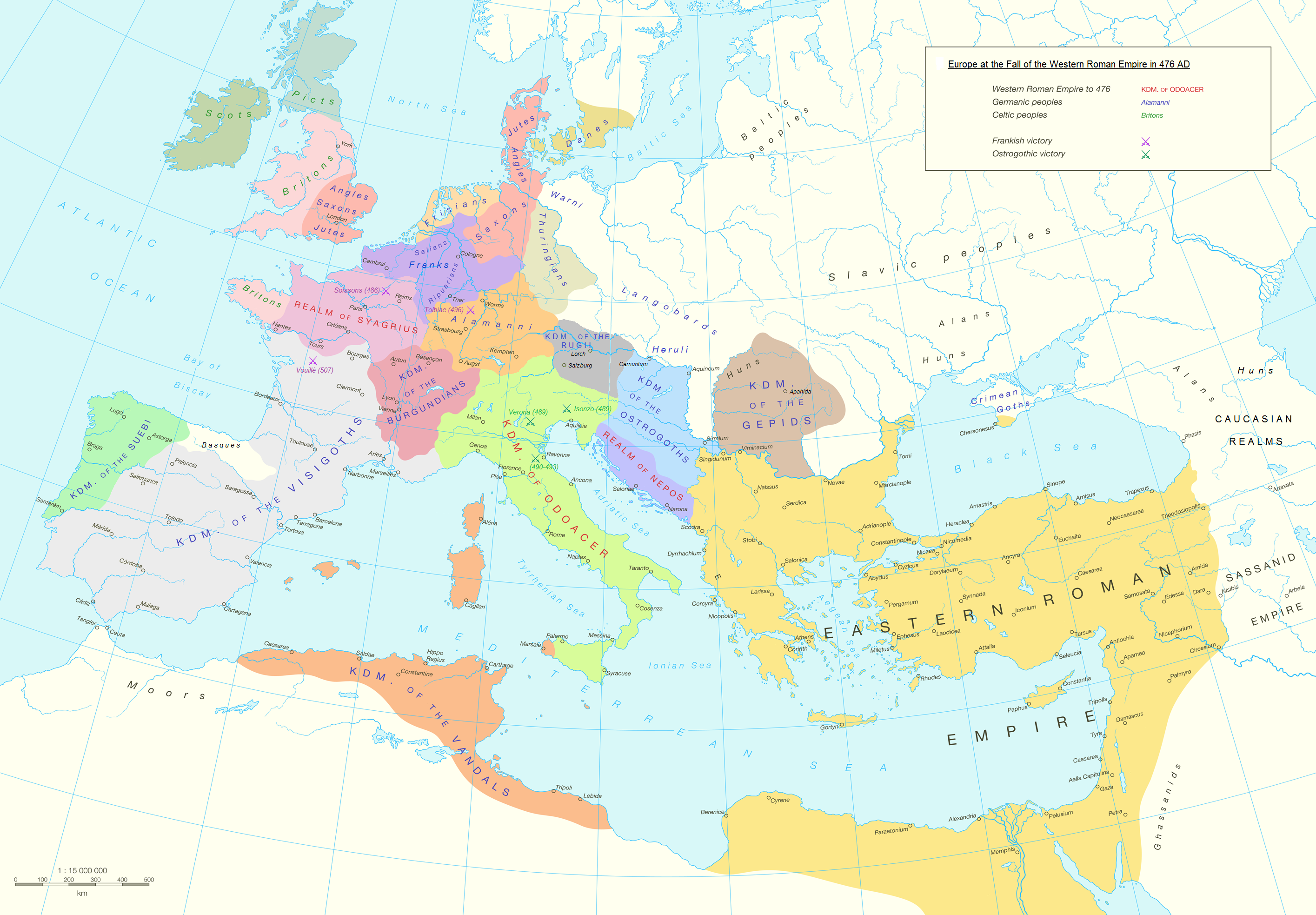
Barbarian kingdoms (476)

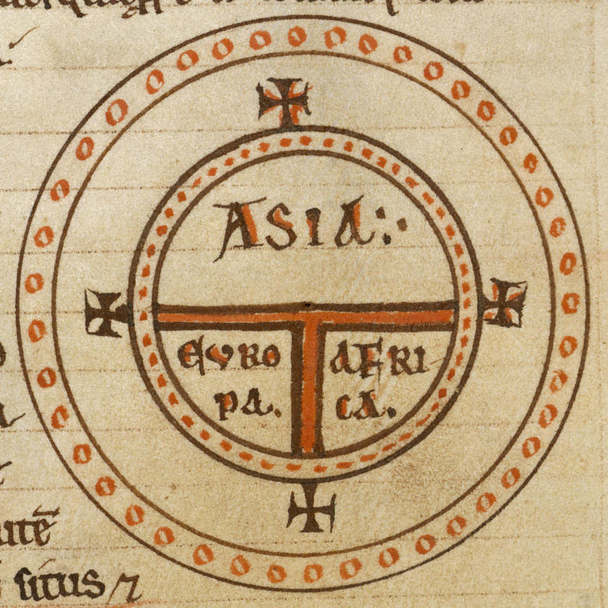
"T and O map" from Bishop Isidore of Seville's Etymologiae (c. 625) identifying the world's continents (Asia, Europe and Africa) (Note: The medievalist historian Norman Cantor writes that the "sole cultural legacy" of the Visigoths is the work of Isidore. The city where Isidore was bishop, Seville, was conquered by Umayyad forces in 712.)

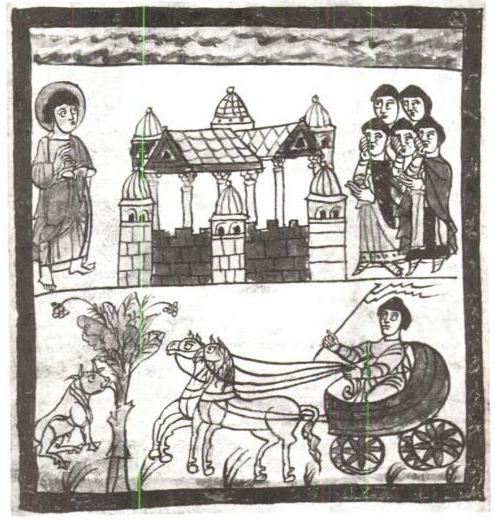
Earliest known depiction of a modern harness, Kingdom of the Franks (c. 800)

After the fall of Rome, Western Europe fragmented into warring kingdoms (Note: See: Franco-Roman War of 486; Battle of Soissons (486); Frankish-Thuringian campaign (491); Battle of Tolbiac (c. 496); Battle of Strasbourg (506); First Franco-Visigothic war (496–498); Franco–Gothic War (507–511); Battle of Vouillé (507); Siege of Arles (507–508)) that continued to struggle with the destructive trends of late antiquity: depopulation, deurbanization, and barbarian invasions. Roman governance collapsed and Greco-Roman culture was all but lost in the western part of the old empire. The gradual adoption of costly parchment, followed by the end of imports of much cheaper papyrus, deepened the Rome-based Latin Church's (Note: Pope Theodore I (r. 642–649) was the first bishop of Rome to formally assume the title of Patriarch of the West.) monopoly on literacy in the region – already entrenched by the collapse of the municipal schools and civic offices that rewarded literate civil officials – and left the Church as the primary source of institutional continuity, legal memory, and administrative expertise for the turbulent post-Roman kingdoms of Western Europe. The Visigoths and Lombards abandoned Arianism (Note: Arianism was a fourth-century faction of Christianity that persisted in opposition to Nicene Christianity among Germanic tribes – including the Visigoths, Ostrogoths and Vandals – who adopted it during their conversion to Christianity and preserved it as a distinct religious identity for over two centuries in Europe until the Lombards, the last major Arian power in Western Europe, converted to Nicene Christianity in the late seventh century.) for Nicene Christianity and the pagan Anglo-Saxons, (Note: Old English was first written using Anglo-Saxon runes in the 5th century. In 597, the arrival of the Gregorian mission in Kent marked the beginning of the Christianisation of Anglo-Saxon England, and with it the reintroduction of the Latin alphabet to Britain, where it was used to write English for the first time. The earliest attested instances of Old English being written using the Latin script were in Anglo-Saxon law codes, including the Law of Æthelberht, drawn up in 616 on behalf of King Æthelberht of Kent. The English word "clerk" derives from the Latin word for "cleric".) Thuringians, and Bavarians converted to Christianity between the late 6th and mid-8th centuries but Muslim conquests of North Africa and the Visigothic Kingdom in Iberia (711–720s) (Note: The most organized and legally sophisticated Germanic Latin Christian kingdom of the era.) left the Kingdom of the Franks ("Francia"), Kingdom of the Lombards (on the Italian Peninsula) and petty Anglo-Saxon kingdoms (in the British Isles) as the only significant Latin Christian realms. Within these three realms, however, the cultural influence of the Latin Church (Note: Cathedral schools established at Canterbury (597), Rochester (604) and York (627) among the Anglo-Saxons are believed to be the oldest schools in the world.) - including its prohibitions on cousin marriage, polygamy, and remarriage within kin groups – ran longest and cut deepest, gradually eroding the extended clans and kinship groups that had long organized Western European society.

Byzantine Empire (565)

Byzantine-Muslim naval conflicts from 7th to 11th centuries

Byzantine Empire (717)

The change in the character of the Constantinople-based Eastern Roman Empire ("Byzantine Empire" (Note: The adjective "Byzantine", derived from Byzantion (Byzantium in Latin), the name of the Greek settlement on which Constantinople was founded, originally referred only to the inhabitants of the city. Its usage began to broaden when Theodore Metochites and Laonikos Chalkokondyles employed "Byzantine" to denote the people of the empire as a whole; a development later widely propagated by Hieronymus Wolf. However, it was not until the mid-19th century that historians began systematically applying "Byzantines" to the empire's inhabitants, and the term is now regarded by many scholars as contentious. For most of the preceding millennium, the "Byzantines" were more commonly described as "Greeks".)) was gradual but by the 7th century Latin titles and usages had been officially replaced with Greek versions. During most of its existence, the Empire was one of the most powerful economic, cultural, and military forces in Europe and Constantinople was Europe's largest and wealthiest city. During the period of the Byzantine Papacy (537–752), the bishops of Rome required Byzantine approval of their elevation, and many were selected from among the apocrisiarii, ambassadors from the Latin Church to the Byzantine court in Constantinople. (Note: Including Pope Gregory I (r. 590–604), known as "St. Gregory the Great" and one of the four Great Latin Church Fathers, who served as an ambassador to Constantinople for 7 years before becoming the bishop of Rome. The interests of popes – whose parish of Western Europe was almost entirely outside of the Empire – and Byzantine emperors increasingly diverged. Conflicts during the Byzantine Papacy caused the downfall of several bishops of Rome. Pope Silverius (r. 536–537) was exiled by a Byzantine general during the Gothic War, Pope Vigilius (r. 537–555) was arrested and brought to Constantinople, Pope Martin I (r. 649–655) was banished to the Crimea, and Pope Sergius I (r. 687–701) only narrowly avoided removal when local troops prevented his abduction by imperial authorities.) The Empire survived plague (541–549), won the Gothic War (535–554), lost most of Italy to the Lombards (568–c. 600), lost the last of its Iberian province (624), prevailed over a Persian/Avar siege of its capital (626), lost Syria (639) and Egypt (642) to the Rashidun Caliphate, survived another siege of Constantinople this time by the Umayyads (674–678), lost the Balkans (681) to the First Bulgarian Empire, lost all of North Africa (by 709) to the Umayyads, and then survived a 2nd siege by the Umayyads (717 to 718). From the 650s onward, the Mediterranean became a battleground between Arab and Byzantine naval forces, with both sides launching raids, counter raids and invasions against islands (Note: The first attacks by Arab ships on Sicily occurred in 652 (although it wasn't finally conquered until 902) while Cyprus was conquered quickly by 654. Crete was conquered in the 820s.) and coastal settlements (Note: The Fatimids sacked Genoa in 935.) and engaging in a naval arms race. In the latter part of the Arab–Byzantine wars, the Republic of Venice (Note: Venice sought increased prestige by the legendary theft ("translatio") in 828 of the relics of Saint Mark from Alexandria, which provided the city with a patron saint of great Christian significance.) emerged as an important ally of the Byzantines.

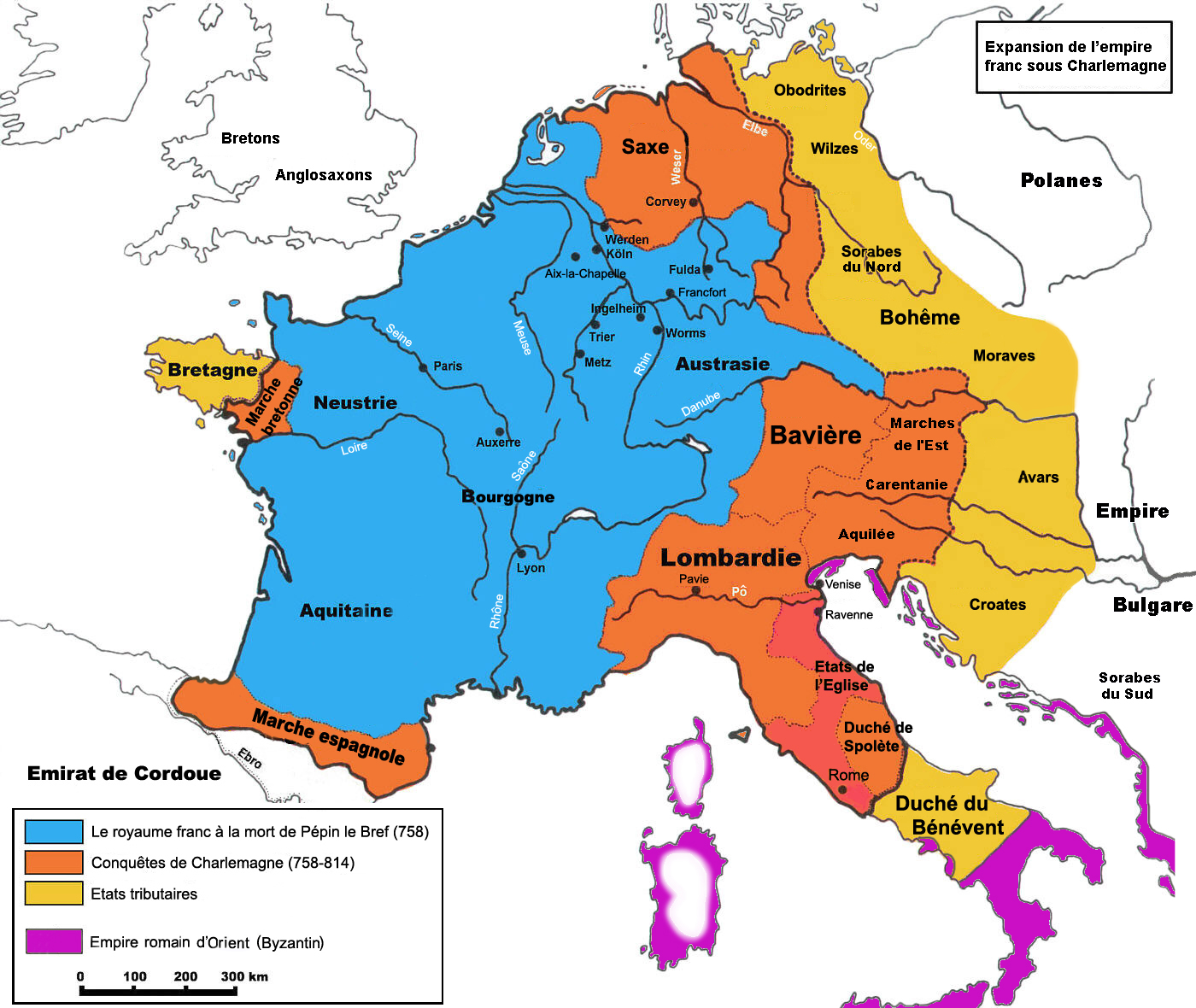
Frankish Empire:
Blue: Pepin the Short (758)
Orange: Charlemagne (814) (Note: Modern France, the Low Countries, most of Germany (reaching east to the Elbe River), Switzerland, Austria, Slovenia, northern and central Italy, northwestern Hungary, northern Croatia, and a strip of northeastern Spain.)
Yellow: Marches and dependencies
Red: Papal States

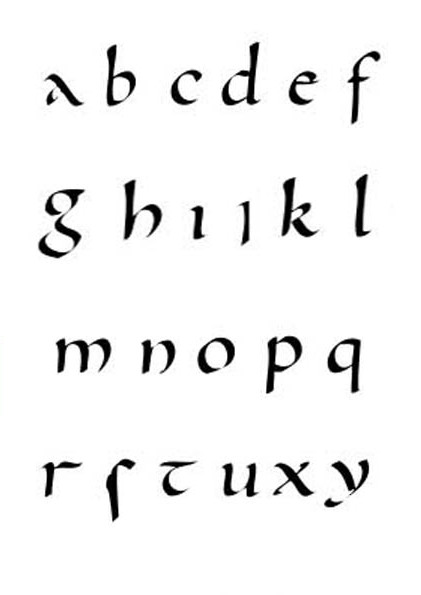
The Carolingian minuscule alphabet was a significantly more legible calligraphic standard than previous scripts.

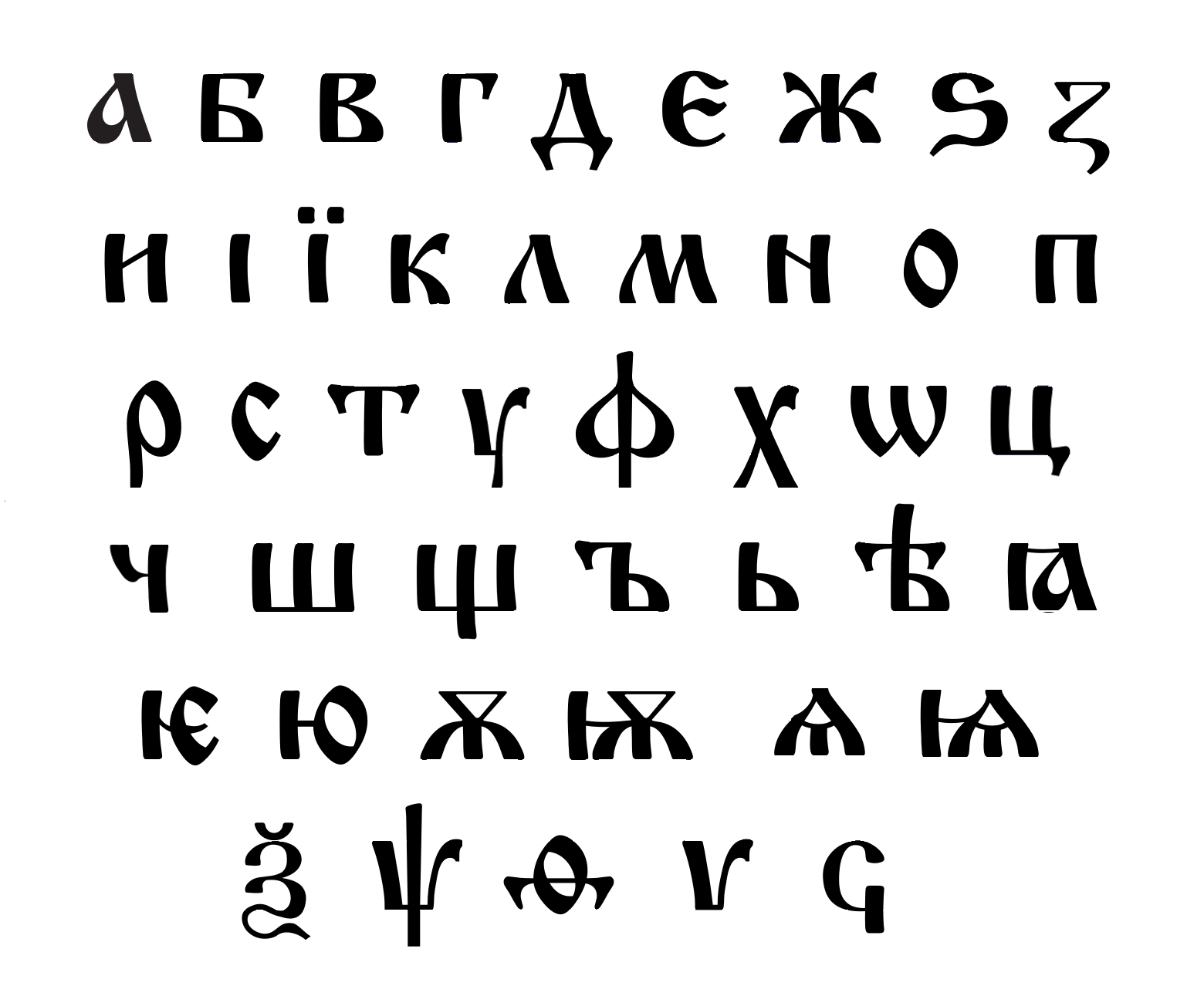
Early Cyrillic alphabet

The Latin Church pivoted from the Byzantine Papacy (Note: Byzantine Emperor Leo III (r. 717–741) confiscated all property of the Latin Church in south Italy and Sicily in 732/33, together constituting most of the Church's income at the time. He further removed the bishoprics of Thessalonica, Corinth, Syracuse, Reggio, Nicopolis, Athens, and Patras from the jurisdiction of the Bishop of Rome, instead subjecting them to the Patriarch of Constantinople. In effect, the Latin Church had been "cast out of the empire". Pope Zachary (r. 741-752) was the last bishop of Rome to announce his election to or seek approval from a Byzantine authority.) to the Frankish Papacy (756–857) when Pope Stephen II (r. 752–757) became the first bishop of Rome to ever cross the Alps and appealed in person to Frankish leadership for military aid against the Lombards, resulting in the creation of the Papal States ruled by the bishops of Rome for the next 1000 years. In 800, Pope Leo III (r. 795–816) crowned Charlemagne (r. 768–814), the King of the Franks, as the first western "Roman" emperor in over 300 years, a direct provocation to the Byzantines who considered themselves to be the Roman Empire. After the Christianization of the First Bulgarian Empire (c. 864) and with key support from Byzantine scholars, the early Cyrillic alphabet, purpose-built for Slavic phonology, was developed there. An increasing rivalry between the Greek East (Note: The Macedonian dynasty ruled the Byzantine Empire from 867 to 1056. During this period, the Byzantine state reached its greatest extent since the early Muslim conquests.) and Latin West was then expressed in an intense missionary competition among the Slavs through the 9th and 10th centuries, in which Cyrillic played an important role. While Moravia (c. 863), Bohemia (c. 884), Croatia (by 900), and Poland (966) were drawn into the Latin West, the Serbs (c. 870) and Kievan Rus' (988) (Note: Kievan Rus' was the first East Slavic state and, later, an amalgam of principalities in Eastern Europe from the late 9th to the mid-13th century. Encompassing a variety of polities and peoples, including East Slavic, Norse, and Finnic, it was ruled by the Rurik dynasty, founded by the Varangian prince Rurik. The name was coined by Russian historians in the 19th century to describe the period when Kiev was preeminent. At its greatest extent in the mid-11th century, Kievan Rus' stretched from the White Sea in the north to the Black Sea in the south and from the Carpathian Mountains in the west to the Taman Peninsula in the east, uniting the East Slavic tribes.) embraced Cyrillic and linked themselves with the Greek East. (Note: The majority of Orthodox Slavs adopted Cyrillic, while most Catholic Slavs adopted Latin but there were many exceptions to this general rule. In areas where both Churches were proselytising to pagan Europeans, such as the Grand Duchy of Lithuania, the Croatian Duchy and the Principality of Serbia, mixtures of languages, scripts and alphabets emerged, and the lines between Latin Catholic (Latinitas) and Cyrillic Orthodox literacy (Slavia Orthodoxa) were blurred.)

Viking settlements and raids from 8th to 11th centuries.

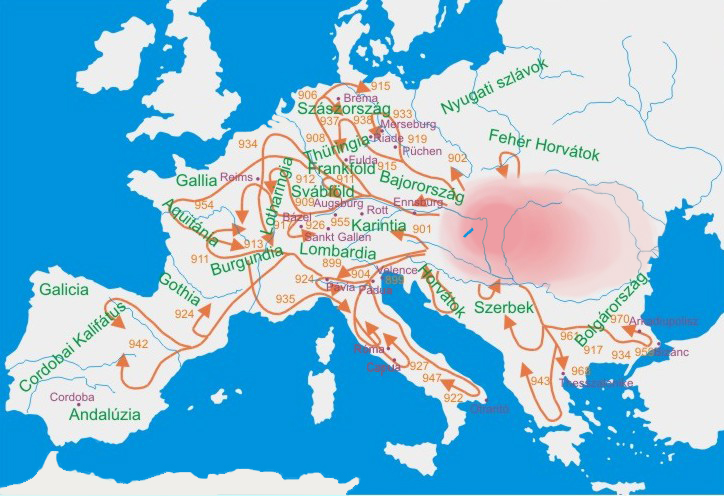
Magyar invasions in the 10th century

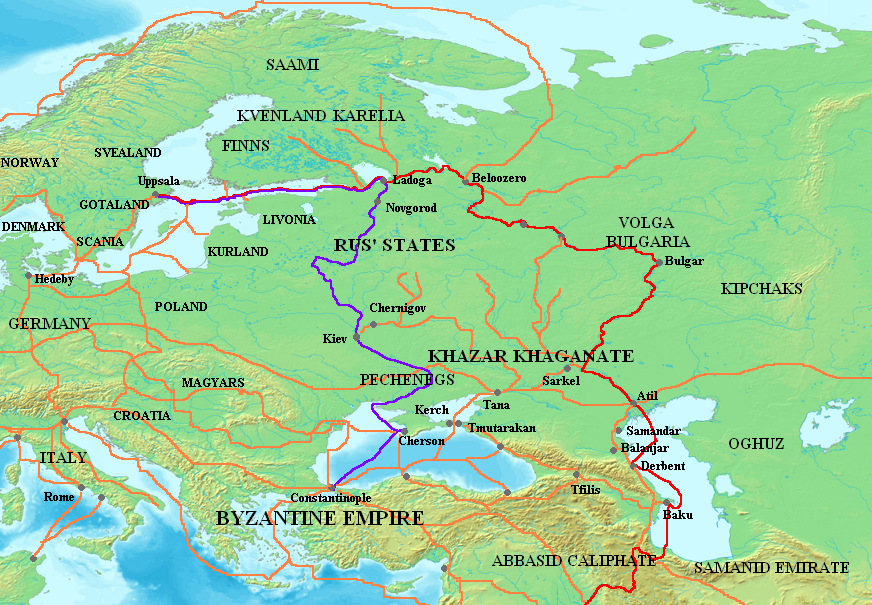
Slave trade (Note: Slavery was a major economic activity. Norse raiders seized captives across the British Isles and from central and eastern Europe, establishing Viking-ruled Dublin as Western Europe's largest slave market and linking the Baltic to the Black Sea via river trade. While both Christians and Muslims banned the enslavement of people of their own faith, both approved of the enslavement of the other. They also both approved of enslaving pagans and pagans from Eastern Europe - who could be sold to Christians, Muslims or other pagans - became the most lucrative choice for slave traders. Arabic silver dirhams, presumably exchanged for slaves, are plentiful in eastern Europe and Southern Sweden, indicating trade routes from Slavic to Muslim territory.) routes:
Red: Vikings to Muslims
Blue: Vikings to Byzantines
Orange: Others, including Venetian, Balkan and Prague routes, 7th–11th centuries

From the 8th until the 11th centuries, Muslims, (Note: Muslims invaded and conquered the Iberian peninsula in the early 8th century.) (Note: In 846, Arab raiders plundered the outskirts of the city of Rome, sacking the basilicas of Old St Peter's and St Paul's-Outside-the-Walls, but were prevented from entering the city itself by the Aurelian Walls.) Vikings (Note: Vikings occupied and plundered Paris in 845. Tens of thousands of Vikings sieged Paris for almost a year starting in 885 but eventually withdrew after being paid by the King of West Francia.) (Note: In 859, a major long-distance Viking expedition, under the command of Björn Ironside and Hásteinn, set out for Spain from their base on the Loire with the objective of sacking the city of Rome. They tried to land at Galicia and were driven off. Then they sailed down the west coast of the peninsula and burned the mosque at Seville, but were repelled by a large Muslim force there before entering the Mediterranean through the Straits of Gibraltar and burning the mosque at Algeciras, following which they headed south to Nekor on the coast of Morocco, plundered the city and defeated a Muslim force that attempted to stop them. According to an account by the Norman monk Dudo of Saint-Quentin, the Viking fleet landed at the Ligurian port of Luni and sacked the city. The Vikings then moved another 60 miles down the Tuscan coast to the mouth of the Arno, sacking Pisa and then, following the river upstream, also the hill-town of Fiesole above Florence.) and Magyars (Note: Including the Battle of Brenta (899), Battle of Pressburg (907), Battle of Eisenach (908), First Battle of Lechfeld (910), Battle of Rednitz (910), Battle of Puchen (919), Battle of Riade (933) and Battle of Wels (943).) raided and invaded from the south, north, and east. Charlemagne's empire was partitioned into West Francia and East Francia (Note: The growth of French and German as vernacular languages in western and eastern Francia contributed to the division of Charlemagne's empire in the mid-9th century. Contemporary sources referred to the first king of East Francia as rex Germaniae.) (843). (Note: The Treaty of Verdun created a "Middle Francia" in addition to a West Francia and East Francia. Except for the Kingdom of Arles – which endured as an independent kingdom until 1032 when it was incorporated into the Holy Roman Empire – the rest of Middle Francia was carved up between West Francia and East Francia within a generation.) In West Francia, Vikings occupied and plundered Paris (845). Arab raiders plundered the outskirts of Rome (846). Vikings sacked Pisa (860), seized York (867), reduced Anglo-Saxon Britain to a single surviving kingdom (878) and besieged Paris for over a year (885–886). The Muslim Aghlabids completed their conquest of Sicily (902). In East Francia, Magyar horse archers annihilated almost the entire secular and ecclesiastical leadership of southeastern Francia in a single battle (907), followed by three additional crushing defeats of East Francian armies soon after at Eisenach (908), Lechfeld (910) and Rednitz (910). In 911, however, after Robert I of France (Note: Robert had participated in the successful defense of Paris against Vikings in 885. His father, Robert the Strong, had been killed by Vikings in 866.) defeated an attacking Viking force at Chartres, the King of West Francia signed a treaty with the defeated Vikings that established the Duchy of Normandy at the mouth of the Seine, turning former raiders into a defensive bulwark and helping to set in motion West Francia’s evolution into the Kingdom of France. East Francia also showed its resilience (Note: After suffering multiple defeats to the Magyars, the East Francian king built fortified towns and trained a new elite cavalry force.) by winning decisive victories against the Magyars at Riade (933) and Lechfeld (955) that directly led to it evolving into the Holy Roman Empire. By the turn of the millennium, the Magyars had ended their Western European raids, settled into a sedentary lifestyle, converted to Latin Christianity, and established the Kingdom of Hungary. Further expanding the Latin West, Scandinavians (Denmark, Norway and Sweden) also converted to Christianity. (Note: According to historian Anders Winroth, Christianity was adopted by Scandinavian kings who saw the religion as politically advantageous. Starting with a declaration by Harald Bluetooth (r. c. 958 – c. 986) around AD 965, Denmark was the first Scandinavian country to Christianize. The conversion of Scandinavian kings to Christianity was complete by 1020.) When a Danish prince invaded England (Note: Anglo-Saxon Britain had been a single kingdom - the Kingdom of England - since 927 when the Anglo-Saxon kingdoms were consolidated under King Æthelstan.) in 1016 after centuries of Norse raiding, he won himself a Christian kingdom, not Viking loot. (Note: Cnut (r. 1016-1035) was a Christian before he was king. As King of England, he repaired English churches and monasteries that were victims of Viking plunder and refilled their coffers, and built new churches and was a patron of monastic communities. In 1027, he traveled to Rome to meet the Pope.)

=== High Middle Ages ===
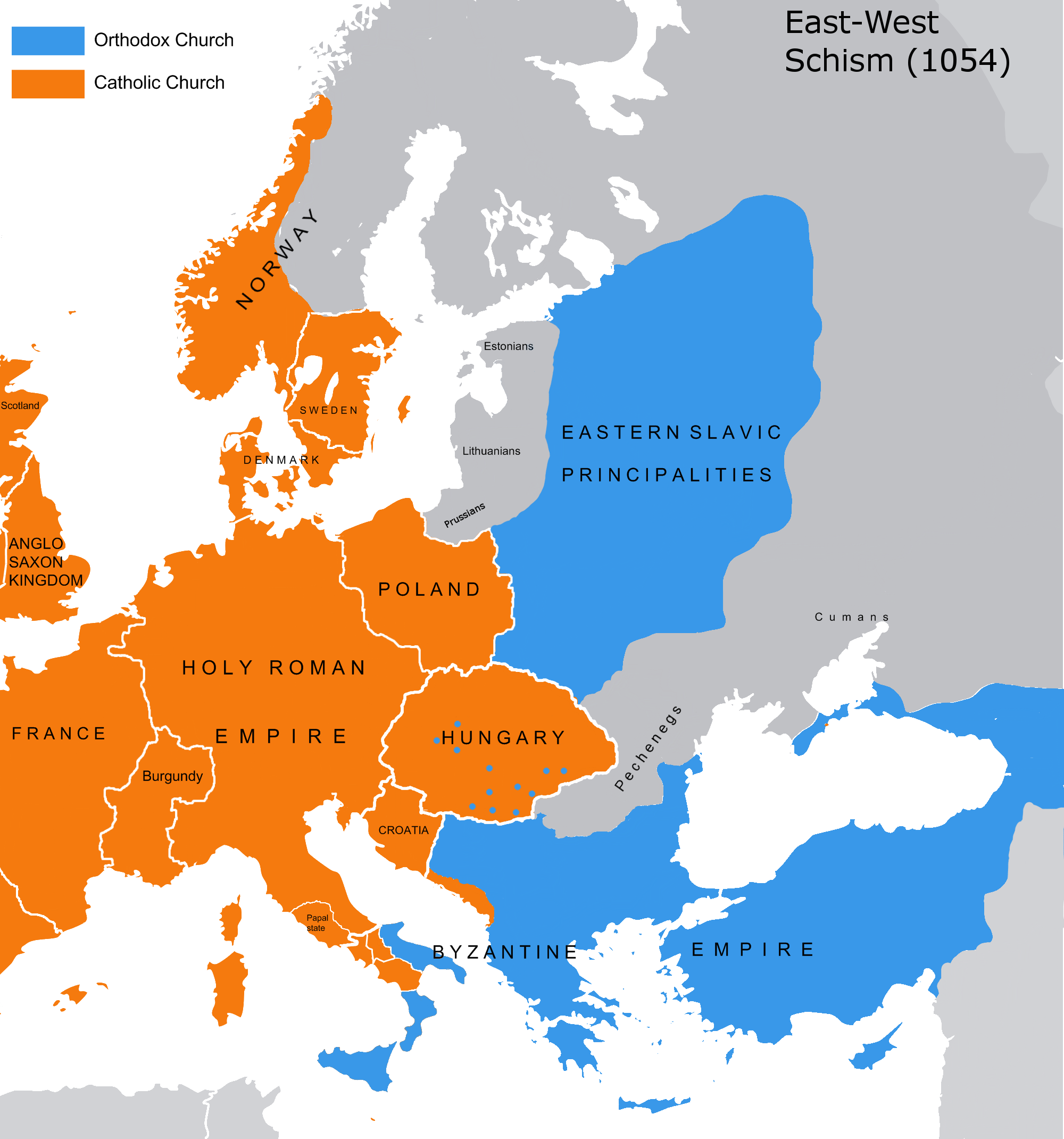
Great Schism between the Latin Church and Eastern Orthodox Church (1054)

Europe (1100)

Reconquista (1157)

In 1046 the Holy Roman Emperor Henry III (r. 1046–1056) deposed Pope Gregory VI (r. 1045–1046) – who had purchased his office – along with two other claimants, beginning the process of freeing the leadership of the Latin Church from the control of the local Roman nobility. (Note: With the decline of Carolingian power in the 9th century, the leadership of the Latin Church became a "puppet" of Roman nobility. Historian Will Durant refers to the period from 867 to 1049 as the "nadir of the papacy". The period included the Cadaver Synod (897), when a deranged bishop of Rome had the rotting corpse of a predecessor exhumed and put on trial.) Pope Leo IX (r. 1049–1054), a German, recruited an international circle of radical reformers (Note: Including the Italian ascetic Peter Damian (c. 1007–1072 or 1073) and the French theologian Humbert of Silva Candida (c. 1000 to 1015–1061).) who helped him create an "itinerant papacy" that moved from city to city to hold church councils, consecrate cathedrals, and negotiate with secular rulers. After centuries of growing rivalry, Leo's dynamic papacy also precipitated the East–West Schism (also "Great Schism") that split the Latin Church from the Eastern Orthodox Church of the Byzantine Empire in 1054. One of Leo's reformist successors, Pope Nicholas II (r. 1059–1061), and his influential advisor Cardinal Hildebrand of Sovana, issued the papal bull In nomine Domini (1059), which stripped the Holy Roman Emperor of his traditional role in appointing popes and established the College of Cardinals as the sole electors. (Note: All of the bishops in Germany (who supported the Emperor) assembled in 1061 and declared all the decrees of Nicholas II null and void. Nevertheless, the election of Pope Alexander II (by six cardinal-bishops) proceeded that year without the involvement of the Emperor. (Alexander was another reformer.) .) After Cardinal Hildebrand was himself elected Pope Gregory VII (r. 1073–1085), he worked to improve the moral integrity and independence of Church clergy, protect Church property and establish the total freedom of the Church from secular interference ("libertas ecclesiae"). By challenging the Holy Roman Emperor Henry IV's (r. 1084–1105) right to appoint church officials, Gregory began the Investiture Controversy, the "first of the great world revolutions of western history" and "the turning point in medieval civilization." (Note: The most radical of the Gregorian reformers – including Pope Gregory VII himself – believed in the complete supremacy of Church over State.)

In 1095 the Byzantine emperor requested military support in his Empire's conflict with the Seljuk Empire. (Note: The frontiers of the Byzantine Empire had been under almost constant pressure since the 6th century but the Empire suffered perhaps the single greatest military defeat in its entire history at the Battle of Manzikert in 1071 at the hands of the Seljuk Empire.) In response, Pope Urban II (r. 1088–1099) spread a message of holy war across Western Europe. The ensuing Crusades (Note: The Crusades created small Catholic states in the Levant, which lasted for two centuries until their final outpost fell to the Mamluk Sultanate.) raised Papal prestige, as did the compromise the Church won with the Holy Roman Emperor in 1122. In addition, with the consistent support of the Church, Iberian Christian attacks on Muslim-ruled al-Andalus were reversing the 8th century Muslim conquest of the Visigothic Kingdom.

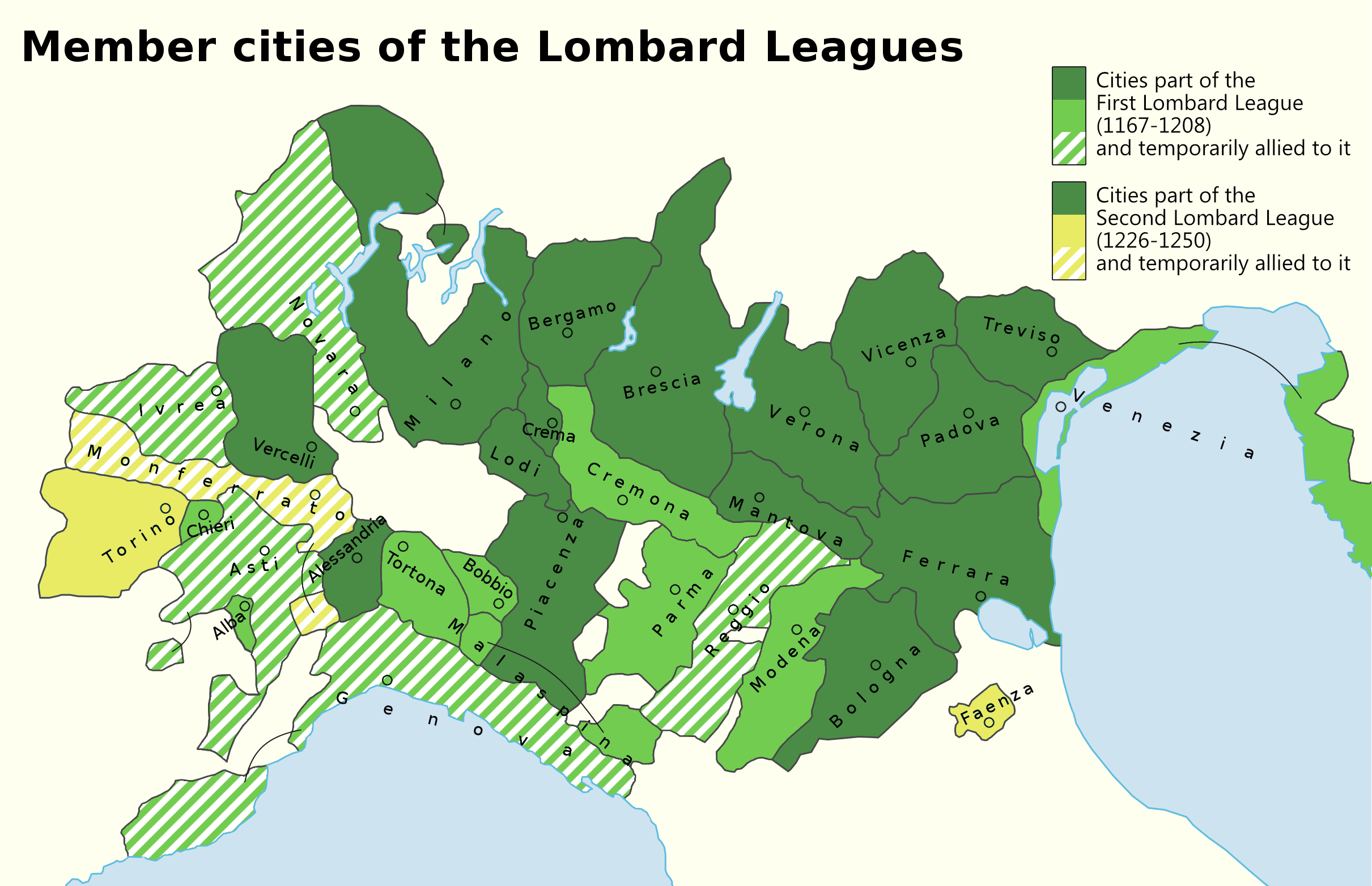
Member cities of the Lombard League

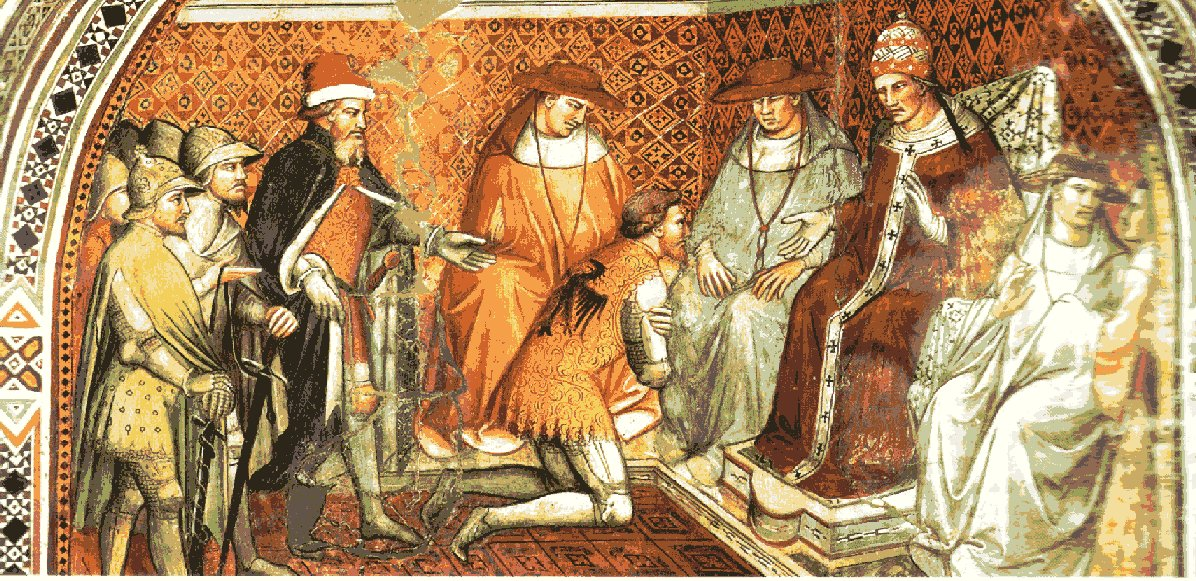
Holy Roman Emperor Frederick Barbarossa kneels before Pope Alexander III before signing the Treaty of Venice (1177). (Note: The fresco is located in Siena's town hall, the "Palazzo Pubblico".)

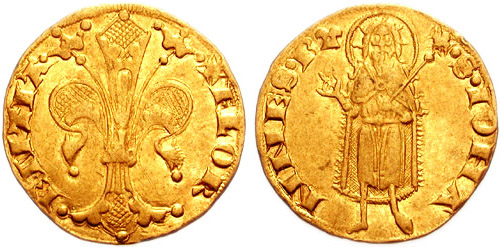
The first minting of the fiorino d'oro - the golden florin - occurred in 1252 in the Republic of Florence.

Along with the existing Republic of Venice, (Note: From the 8th until the 15th century, Venice held a monopoly on the spice trade with the Middle East. The trade made the region rich. It has been estimated that around 1,000 tons of pepper and 1,000 tons of other common spices were imported into Western Europe each year during the Late Middle Ages. The value of these goods was the equivalent of a yearly supply of grain for 1.5 million people.) new Italian city-state maritime republics like Genoa and Pisa (from c. 1000), and Florence (from 1115), thrived on expanding commerce. Pope Alexander III (r. 1159–1181) strongly backed the 1167–1168 alliance of these northern Italian cities, (Note: Lombard League and allies (1167–1168): Alessandria; Bergamo; Bologna; Brescia; Crema; Cremona; Ferrara; Republic of Genoa; Lodi; Mantua; Milan; Modena; Novara; Padua; Parma; Piacenza; Reggio Emilia; Treviso; Republic of Venice; Vercelli; Verona; Vicenza) (Note: The Church was also in conflict with the Kingdom of England during Alexander's papacy. The Archbishop of Canterbury was assassinated by associates of the King in 1170.) which defeated the Holy Roman Empire at the Battle of Legnano (1176) and won their effective independence from the Empire in the Peace of Constance (1183). Aligned with the Church in its bitter conflict with the Holy Roman Emperor, the commune of Bologna captured the Emperor’s son near Modena (1249) and purchased the freedom of nearly 6,000 serfs in 1256, the first abolition of serfdom in Europe. After the Battle of Campaldino (1289), Florence passed laws in the 1290s to align itself with the Church against the Empire (Note: The Guelphs and Ghibellines were factions supporting the Pope (Guelphs) and the Holy Roman Emperor (Ghibellines). During the 12th and 13th centuries, rivalry between these two parties dominated political life across northern and central Italy.) and ensure that the city's merchant and artisan guilds controlled the government. Northern Italian cities led a commercial revolution and made Italy the most productive region of Europe in the Middle Ages.

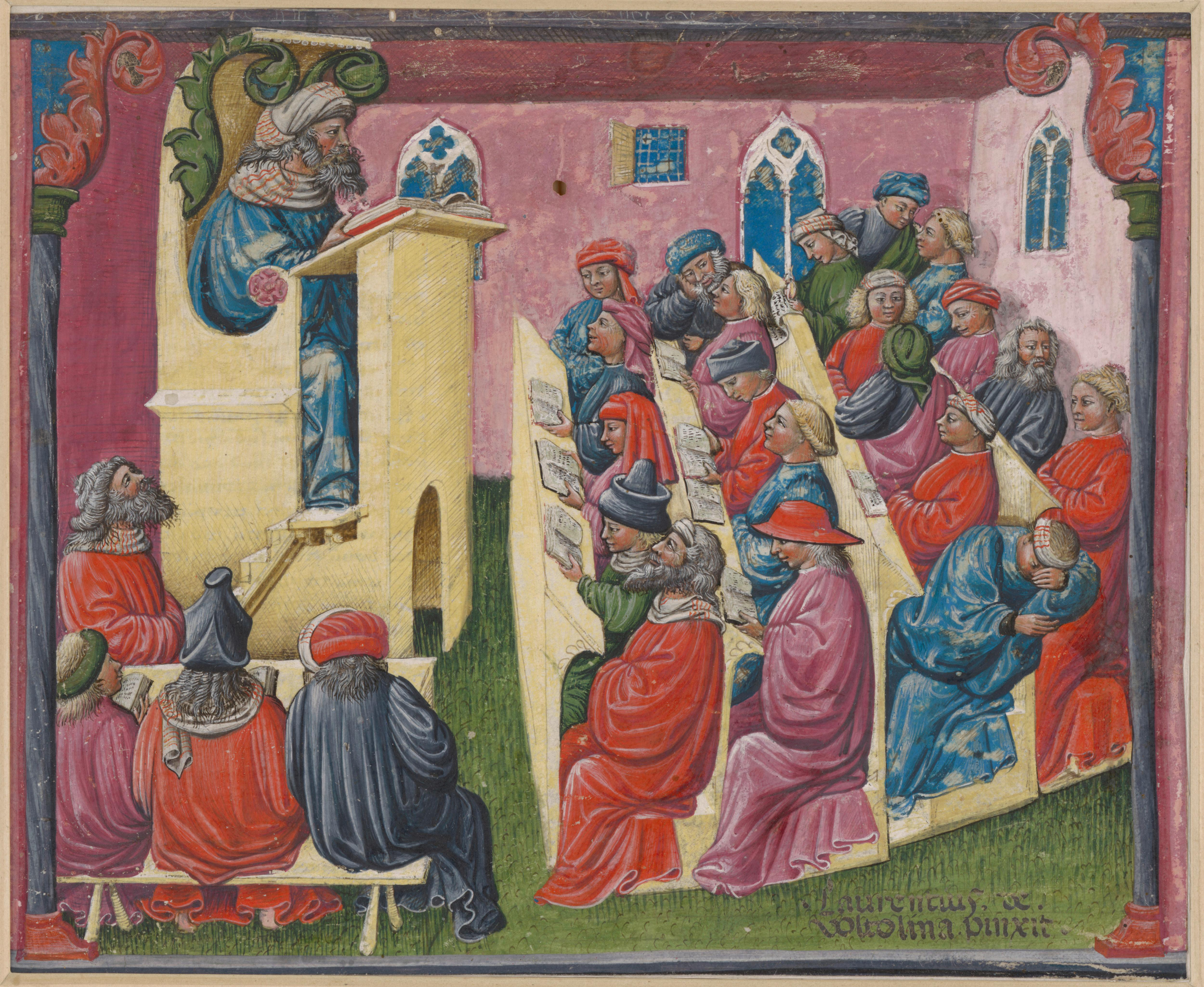
14th-century image of a university lecture

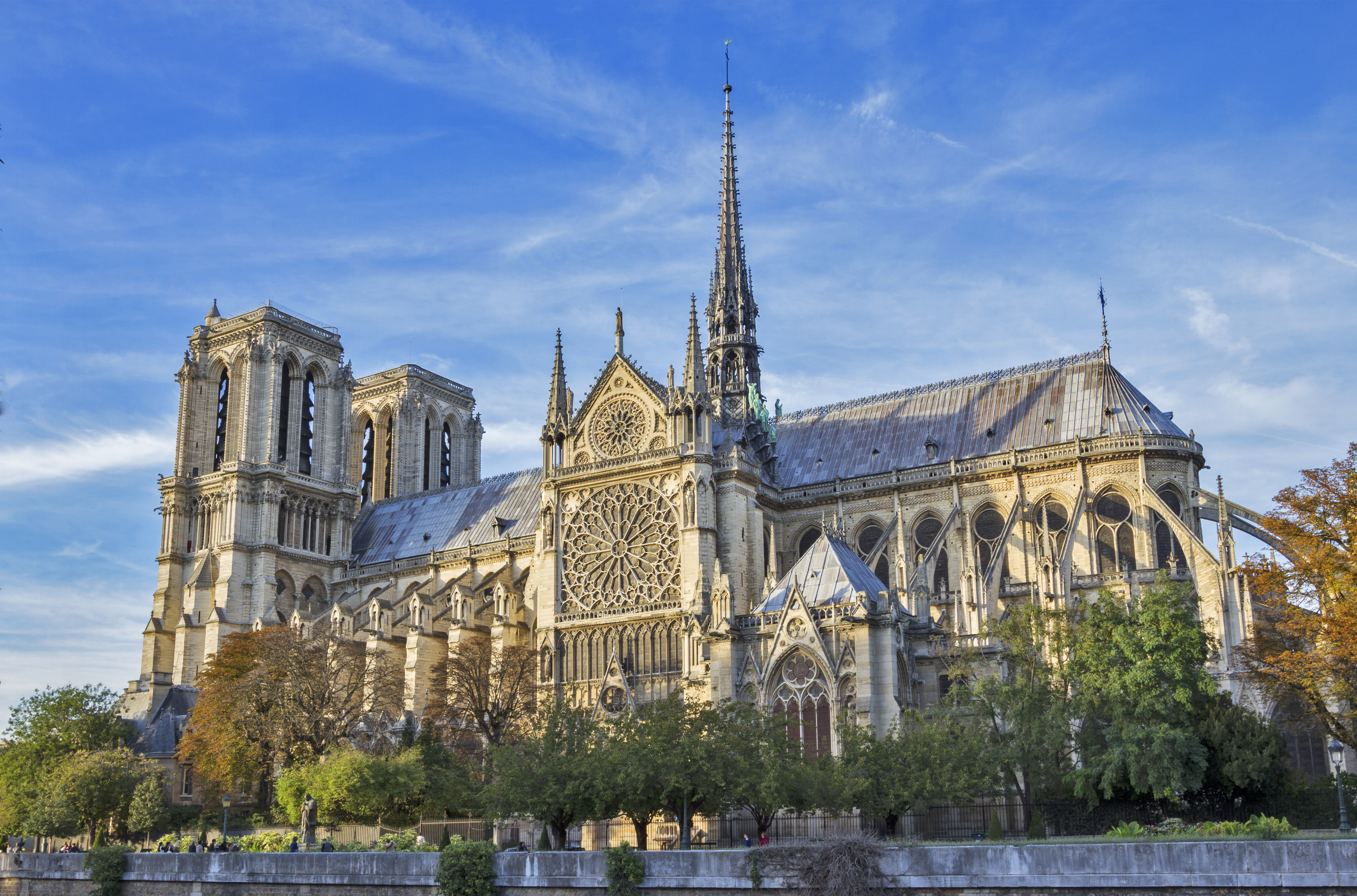
Notre-Dame de Paris, constructed between 1163 and 1260. Romanesque and Gothic architecture flourished during the High Middle Ages.

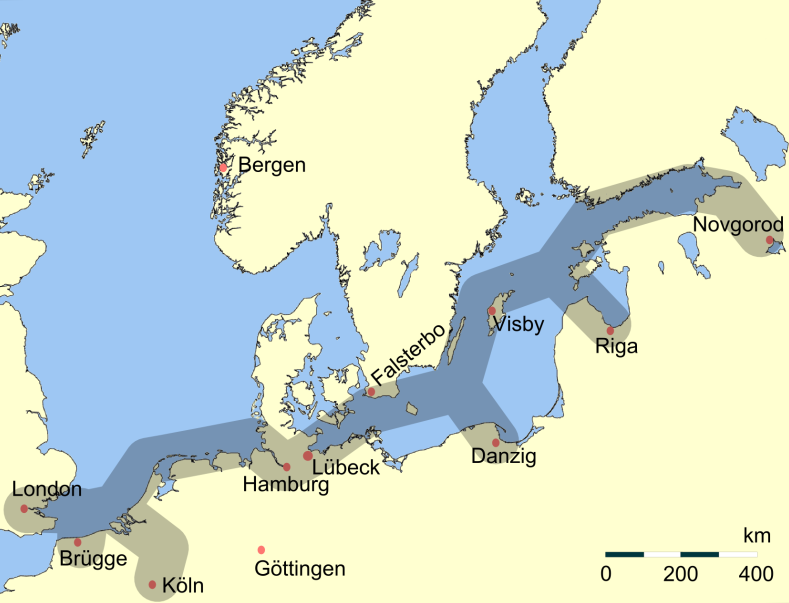
Main trading routes of the Hanseatic League

As trade through the heart of Europe linked the dynamic city-states of Northern Italy with the Flemish textile industry starting in the 11th century and medieval Europe became perhaps the first society in human history to build an economy on nonhuman power, land under cultivation and the number of towns grew together in northern and central Europe. Central Europe alone saw some three thousand new towns founded between the eleventh and early fourteenth centuries. Beginning in the 13th century, the Hanseatic League, a commercial and defensive network of merchant guilds and market towns in northern Europe, grew to dominate maritime trade in the Baltic and North seas in the following century. Northern European glassworks grew by producing less expensive window glass from wood ashes while Venetian artisans specialized in the more expensive clear soda-lime glass for luxury products that later enabled the 13th century invention of spectacles. (Note: The first eyeglasses were made in central Italy, most likely in Pisa or Florence, by about 1290, after which the widespread manufacture and use of optical glass for eyeglasses expanded rapidly in Europe. Venice became an important center of colorless glass manufacture by 1300.) Medieval engineers produced the first weight-driven mechanical clocks around the same time and every city in Europe soon possessed at least one. Historical demographers estimate that sustained growth during the High Middle Ages – enabled by a thriving north-south "bipolar urban network" and major breakthroughs in technology – pushed Europe's population by 1250 beyond the peak levels reached during the era of the Roman Empire and in some places to levels it would not see again until the 19th century.

Beginning with the University of Bologna and the University of Oxford (Note: Oxford masters were officially recognised as a universitas or corporation in 1231.), the oldest universities currently in continuous operation in the world (Note: The original Latin word universitas refers in general to "a number of persons associated into one body, a society, company, community, guild, corporation, etc". As urban town life and medieval guilds developed, specialized associations of students and teachers with collective legal rights (these rights were usually guaranteed by charters issued by princes, prelates, or their towns) became denominated by this general term. Like other guilds, they were self-regulating and determined the qualifications of their members.) emerged in the late 11th and 12th centuries. These new institutions were key participants in the Renaissance of the 12th century and the absorption of lost knowledge from Latin translations of Greek writers, (Note: In addition to Aristotle, 12th century European translators also produced Latin translations of Euclid, Ptolemy, Galen, Hippocrates, and Archimedes.) and became a foundation for many of Europe's future achievements, especially in science. (Note: By 1500, Europe had 64 universities. No matter where they were located, however, Latin was used.) At the turn of the 13th century, Leonardo da Pisa (c. 1170-c. 1240-50) - commonly known as Fibonacci - popularized Arabic numerals and base-10 positional notation. Reacting to the rediscovery of Aristotle, the Italian priest Thomas Aquinas (1225–1274) and other thinkers developed the philosophy of scholasticism.

Mongol Empire (1206–1294)

After conquering the fractured principalities of the former Kievan Rus' (Note: The largest successor states of Kievan Rus' in the early 13th century were the Principality of Galicia–Volhynia, Vladimir-Suzdal and the Novgorod Republic.) and the Kipchak-Cuman Confederation, Mongol (Note: The Mongol Empire was the largest contiguous empire in history. Originating in present-day Mongolia in East Asia, the medieval empire at its height in the late 13th and early 14th centuries stretched from the Sea of Japan all the way to Europe. During the Pax Mongolica, European merchants like Marco Polo (c. 1254–1324) made their way from Europe to China on the well-maintained and well travelled roads that linked Anatolia to China and it is thought that thousands of Europeans lived in China during the Yuan dynasty.) armies invaded Central Europe in 1241, defeating a Polish-Moravian force at Legnica and crushing the Hungarians at Mohi before withdrawing. (Note: The Kingdom of Hungary defeated a 2nd Mongol invasion from 1285 to 1286. The Kingdom of Poland repelled an invasion from 1287 to 1288.) (Note: Conquered regions that included eastern Europe were later known as the Golden Horde. Contemporary sources employed several different dynastic and geographical designations. Persian sources, including the Jami' al-tawarikh, used "Ulus of Jochi" (Persian Ulūs-i Jūchī) for the Jochid realm. Islamic geographical and historical literature also continued to use the older regional designation "Dasht-i Qipchaq" (Persian: دشت قپچاق, "Qipchaq Steppe"), while Latin sources used "Comania" or "Cumania" for parts of the same wider steppe region.) The adjacent Russian principalities had a vassalage relationship with Mongolian khanates for the next two centuries.

=== Late Middle Ages ===
The spread of the Black Death (1346 to 1353)

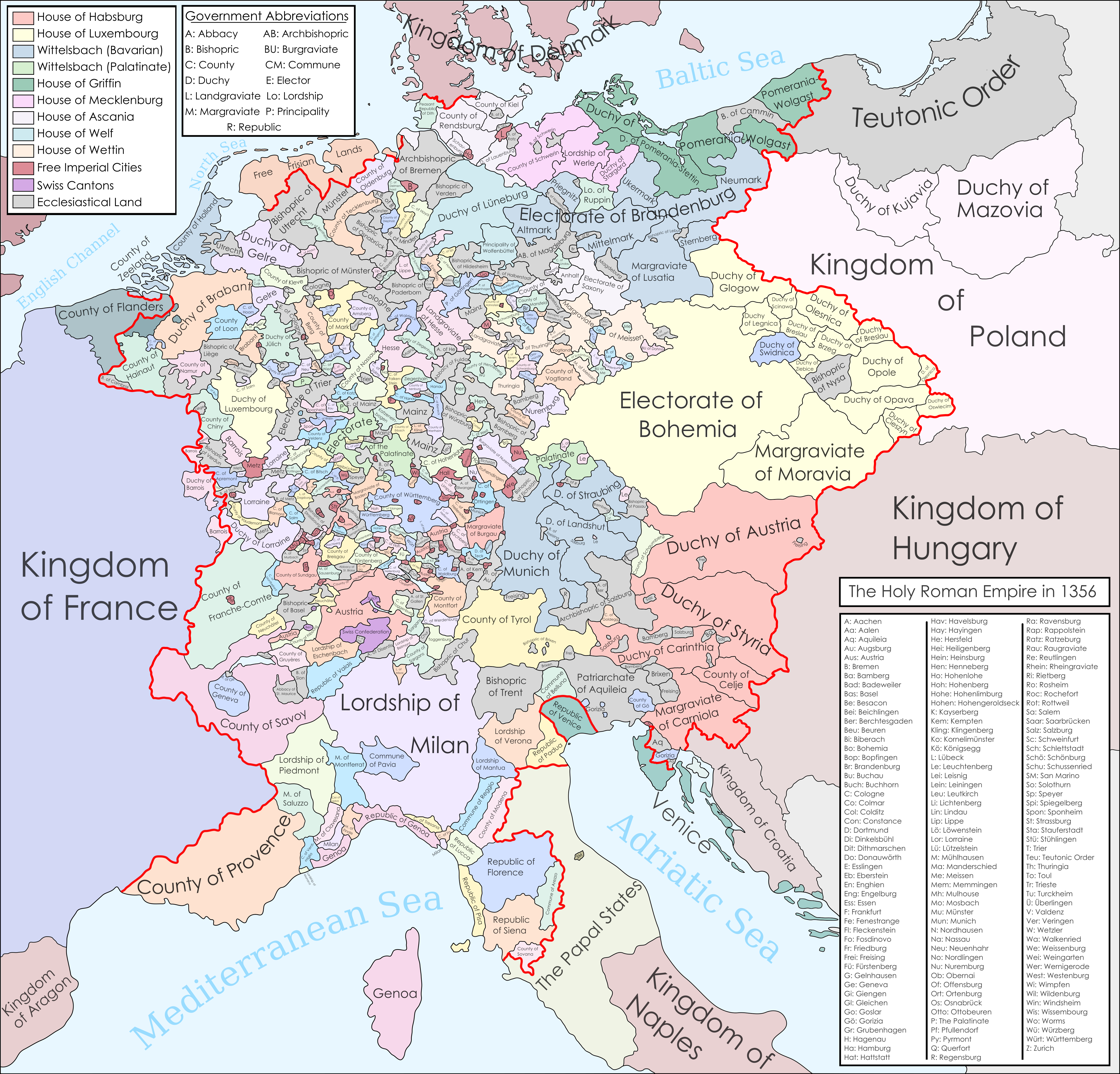
Starting in 1356, the emperor of the Holy Roman Empire was chosen by seven prince-electors, while the hundreds of other states comprising the empire exercised influence through the Imperial Diet.

Centuries of European prosperity and growth unraveled during the crisis of the late Middle Ages. The Great Famine of 1315–1317 caused extreme levels of crime, disease, mass death, and even cannibalism and infanticide. The Black Death (1346–1353) killed people in a matter of days, reducing the population of some areas by half as many survivors fled.

More than a century of intermittent warfare (Note: During the Hundred Years' War, five generations of kings from two rival dynasties fought for the throne of France, then the wealthiest and most populous kingdom in Western Europe. The war had a lasting effect on European history: both sides produced innovations in military technology and tactics, including professional standing armies and artillery, that permanently changed European warfare. Despite the devastation on its soil, the century of off-and-on warfare accelerated the process of transforming France from a feudal monarchy to a centralised state. French kings' demands for consistent and permanent taxation for financing standing armies overcame the opposition of the French nobility, vastly increasing French state capability.) and popular uprisings, including the Jacquerie (1358) and the Peasants' Revolt (1381), staggered France and England, while the prestige and unity of the Catholic Church suffered long-term damage from the Avignon Papacy (1309–1376) (Note: Pope Clement V (r. 1305–1314), the first "Avignon" pope, ordered the arrest of all Knights Templar in 1307 and allowed the execution of many of its members. King Philip IV of France (1285-1314) had Jacques de Molay, last Grand Master of the Knights Templar, burned on a scaffold on an island in the River Seine in front of Notre Dame de Paris in 1314.) and the Western Schism (1378–1417).

Despite these crises, a great effort to rediscover and revive the cultural achievements of classical antiquity began in 14th-century Florence, spread across Italy and Europe, and transformed art, architecture, and literature. Renaissance humanists, including several 15th- and 16th-century popes, (Note: Including Innocent VII, Nicholas V, Pius II, Sixtus IV, Alexander VI, Julius II and Leo X. Innocent VII, patron of the historian Leonardo Bruni, is considered the first humanist Pope.) perceived their repossession of a lost past as a rebirth of civilization.

The rising Ottoman Empire (Note: The Ottoman Empire emerged from a beylik, or principality, founded in northwestern Anatolia in c. 1299 by the Turkoman tribal leader Osman I. His successors conquered much of Anatolia and expanded into the Balkans by the mid-14th century, transforming their petty kingdom into a transcontinental empire.) conquered the Second Bulgarian Empire by the end of the 14th century. The Byzantine Empire - the last remnant of the Roman Empire - fell in 1453 when the Ottomans' massive cannons finally breached the walls of Constantinople, ending eleven centuries of Byzantine civilization in Eastern Europe. (Note: In the next 70 years, the Ottomans and Hungarians continued fighting the Hungarian–Ottoman Wars until 1526 when, after an appeal for help from an imprisoned king of France, the Ottomans crushed the Hungarian army at the Battle of Mohács, killed King Louis II and ended the medieval Kingdom of Hungary.)

== Early modern Europe ==
Early modern Europe spans the centuries between the Middle Ages and the Industrial Revolution. (Note: Commonly cited breaks with the medieval period between 1450 and 1500 include the fall of Constantinople to the Ottoman Empire, the spread of printing and European voyages of discovery to America and along the African coast.) The period includes the rapid spread of mechanical movable-type printing, the Age of Discovery, the Protestant Reformation, the European colonisation of the Americas, the Scientific Revolution, the disastrous Thirty Years' War and the emergence of the five great European powers.

=== Printing ===
Spread of the movable type printing-press between 1450 and 1500.

From a single location in the Free Imperial City of Mainz in the 1450s, movable type printing had spread to about 270 cities across Europe and produced more than 20 million volumes by the end of the 15th century. Just 25 miles away, the Frankfurt Book Fair (Note: Like nearby Mainz, Frankfurt was a free imperial city of the Holy Roman Empire.) was established by 1462 and remained the primary marketplace for printers and publishers and the center of Europe's book trade for the next two centuries. By the 16th century, the manuscript culture of the Middle Ages, where facts were few and far between, had begun to give way to a printing culture where living scholars could compare their own observations with those of other (living) scholars, transforming how knowledge was created, preserved and disseminated.

=== Exploration, epidemics and colonies ===
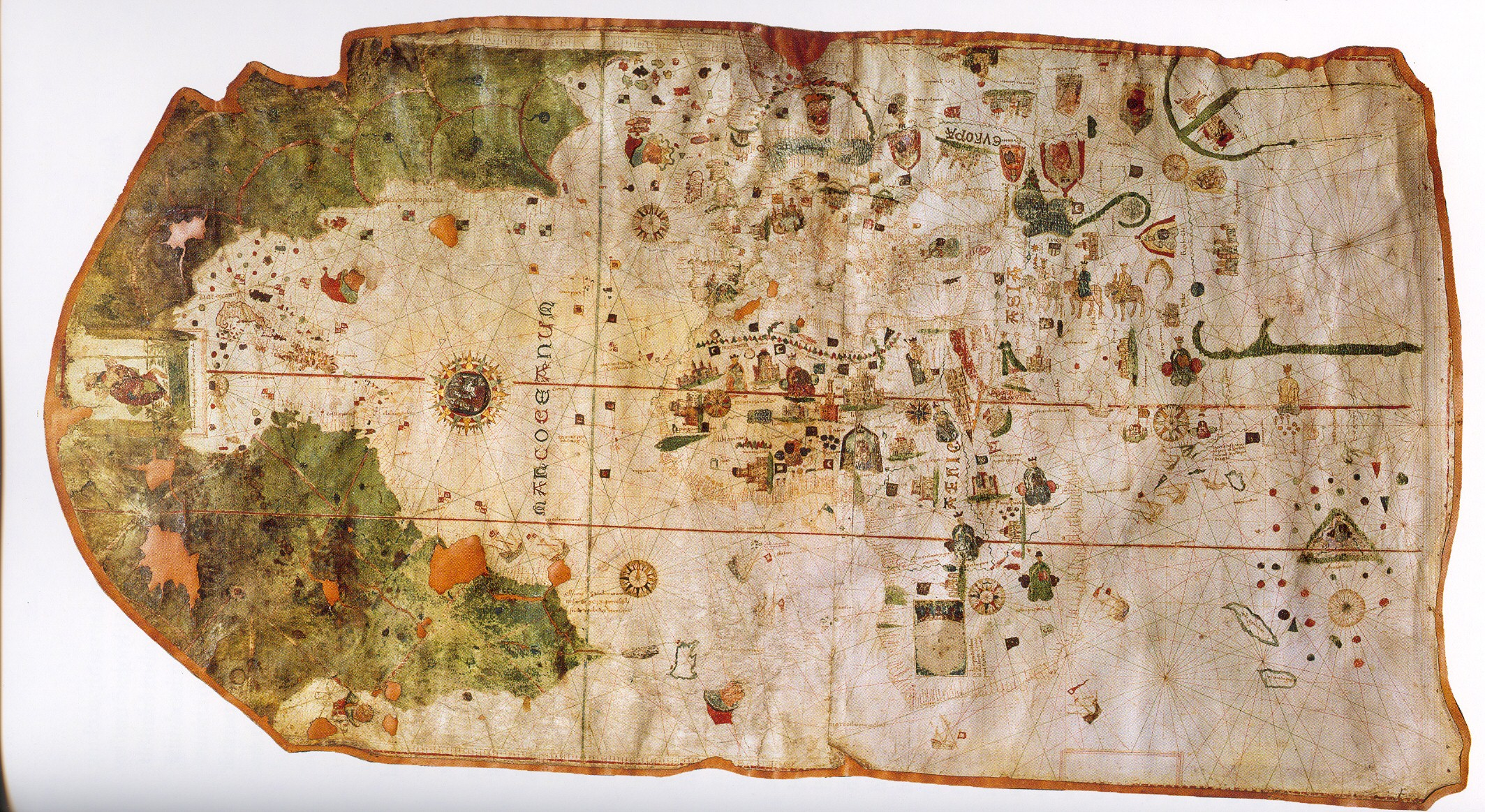
Map of Juan de la Cosa (1500), includes Europe, Africa, parts of Asia and the earliest known representation of the New World.

Mare clausum ('closed sea') claims during the Age of Discovery.

The title page of Francis Bacon's Novum Organum Scientiarum (1620) depicts a galleon passing between the mythical Pillars of Hercules. (Note: The "Pillars of Hercules" stand on either side of the Strait of Gibraltar, marking the exit from the well-charted waters of the Mediterranean into the unknowns of the Atlantic Ocean. In this image, the Pillars have been smashed through by European sailors, leading to the discovery of previously unknown continents. Bacon argues that a new method for attaining knowledge will begin a similar era of new discovery. The page was liberally copied from Andrés García de Céspedes's Regimiento de Navegación, published in 1606.)

Following explorations of the coast of Africa using new ship technology led by the Kingdom of Portugal’s Prince Henry the Navigator (1394–1460) seeking an eastern maritime route to India and Spanish-funded voyages to the West, the two nations signed the Treaty of Tordesillas (1494), granting Africa and the East to Portugal while Spain claimed the Atlantic and everything beyond it. The Portuguese explorer Vasco da Gama (c. 1460s–1524) completed the first recorded trip directly from Europe to the Indian subcontinent (1497–1499). The Florentine Amerigo Vespucci's Mundus Novus letter, published in 1503 and repeatedly reprinted, provided the first explicit articulation in print that the lands discovered by European navigators to the West were not the edges of Asia, but rather an entirely different continent (a "New World"). Between 1519 and 1522, the Magellan–Elcano expedition achieved the first circumnavigation of Earth in history, (Note: The expedition was funded mostly by King Charles I of Spain, with the hope that it would discover a profitable western route to the Spice Islands, as the eastern route was controlled by Portugal under the 1494 Treaty of Tordesillas. Upon arrival at Cape Verde, the crew was surprised to learn that the ship's date of 9 July 1522 was one day behind the local date of 10 July 1522, even though they had recorded every day of the three-year journey without omission. Cardinal Gasparo Contarini was the first European to give a correct explanation of the discrepancy.) including the first crossing of the Pacific by a European expedition, revealing the vast scale of that ocean. The encounter with continents that were completely unknown to the ancients had a profound impact on European intellectual life and specifically undermined the authority of Claudius Ptolemy, the 2nd-century Alexandrian scholar whose geographic and astronomical models had long been considered infallible.

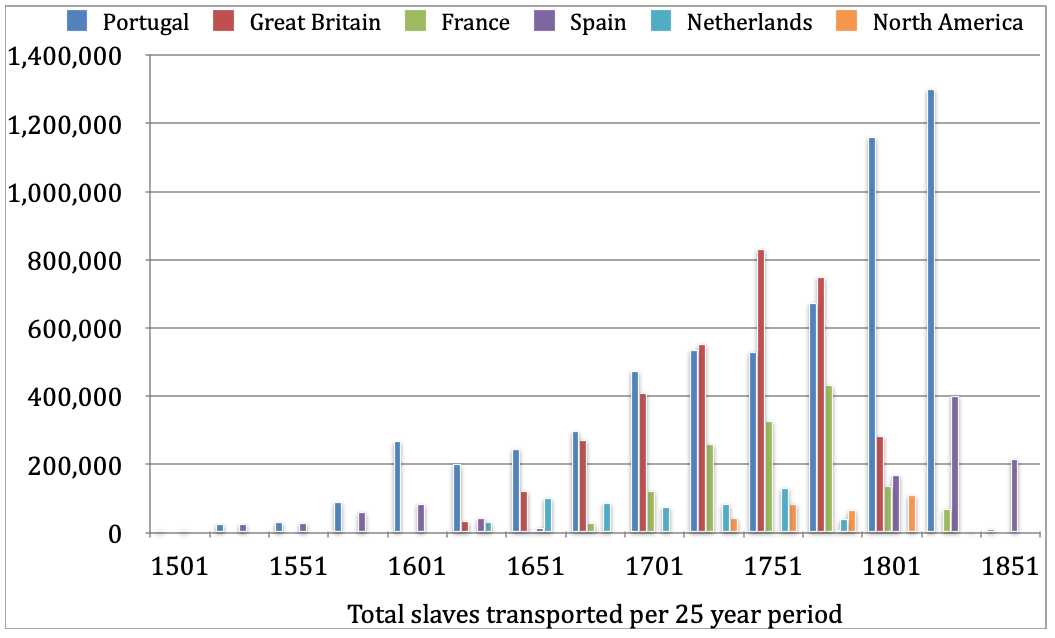
Portugal and Britain were the two largest Atlantic slave trading nations.

Portugal forged the first global empire, but by the late 16th century, the Hispanic Monarchy (incorporating Portugal from 1580 to 1640) had become the world's largest empire, with silver from its American colonies accounting for at least twenty percent of its total revenue. Epidemics of smallpox (Note: Smallpox was especially devastating.) and other Eurasian diseases (Note: Including typhus, measles, influenza, bubonic plague, cholera, malaria, tuberculosis, mumps, yellow fever, and pertussis.) swept the Americas subsequent to European contact, killing between 10 million and 100 million people, up to 95% of the indigenous population of the Americas. While Spain dominated the Americas and controlled the Philippines, in the 17th and 18th centuries Spanish dominance was challenged by the Netherlands, (Note: The Dutch were leading innovators in shipbuilding and seafaring techniques in the 16th century. Dutch expeditions reached Australia in 1606 and New Zealand in 1642.) France (Note: The first French colonial empire stretched to over 10,000,000 km^{2} (3,900,000 sq mi) at its peak in 1710, which was the second largest colonial empire in the world, after the Spanish Empire.) and Britain. (Note: Britain began seizing control of parts of North America in the 17th century, and expanded its control into India and Australasia during the 18th century.) With a plantation economy fueled by slave labor, Saint-Domingue – the "Pearl of the Antilles" – was the richest colony in the 18th-century French empire. (Note: Saint-Domingue produced about 40 percent of all the sugar and 60 percent of all the coffee consumed in Europe, more than all of Britain's West Indian colonies combined.) Europe's colonial plantation economies were sustained by the Atlantic slave trade, which forcibly transported 12 million enslaved Africans (Note: Of these, up to 2 million died during the voyage.) to the Americas between the 16th and 19th (Note: In the Slave Trade Act 1807 (47 Geo. 3 Sess. 1. c. 36), the Parliament of the United Kingdom prohibited the Atlantic slave trade in the British Empire.) centuries.

The diffusion of New World crops during the Columbian exchange reshaped Europe. Maize arrived first and spread swiftly through the Mediterranean and Balkans in the 16th century (Note: By the 17th century, maize was a common peasant food in Southern Europe. By the 18th century, it was the chief food of the southern French and Italian peasantry, especially as polenta in Italy.) while the potato spread far more slowly in northern Europe. (Note: Potatoes yielded about three times the calories per acre of wheat or barley, mainly because it took only 3–4 months to mature versus 10 months for wheat. On top of this, potatoes had higher nutritive value than wheat, could be grown in even fallow and nutrient-poor soil, did not require any special tools, and were considered fairly appetising. A single acre of potatoes could feed a family of five or six, plus a cow, for the better part of a year, an unprecedented level of production. By 1715 the potato was widespread in the Low Countries, the Rhineland, southwestern Germany, and eastern France, but took longer to spread elsewhere.) The higher and more reliable caloric yield per acre of both crops altered the peasant diet and contributed to the retreat of recurrent famine (Note: The European potato failure of the mid-1840s was a significant exception. Northern and Western Europe suffered significant excess mortality, with the highest casualty rates occurring in the Scottish Highlands and Ireland via the Highland Potato Famine and Great Famine respectively. Mass emigration occurred as a result.) and to European population growth and urbanization.

=== Reformation ===
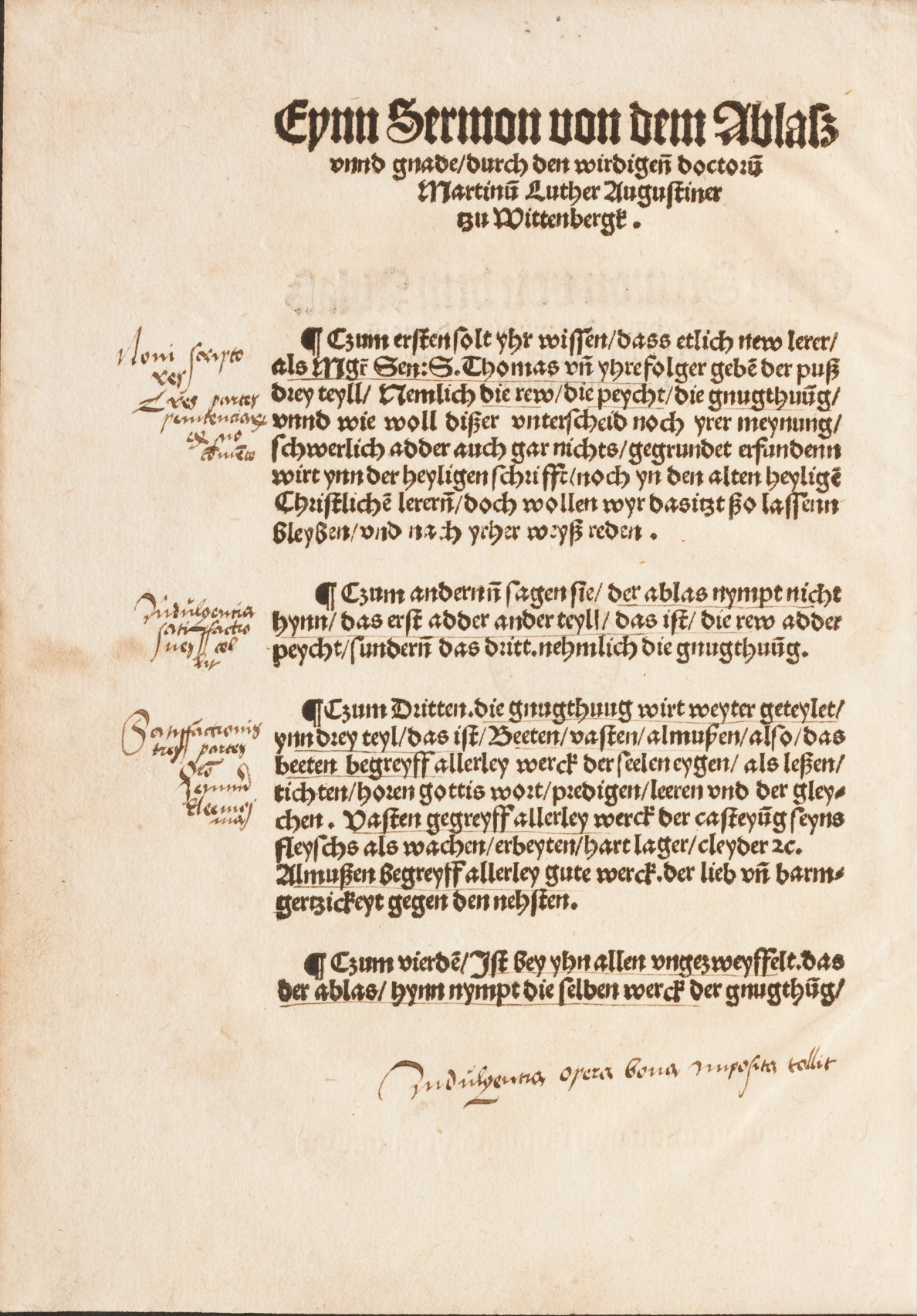
The Sermon on Indulgences and Grace pamphlet, written in German, was reprinted 14 times in 1518 alone, in print runs of at least 1,000 copies. (Note: The Sermon on Indulgences and Grace pamphlet was reprinted 14 times in 1518 alone, in print runs of at least 1,000 copies. It is regarded by many as the true starting point of the Reformation. Luther wrote the sermon in German (unlike his 95 Theses which was written in Latin), and avoided regional vocabulary to ensure that the sermon was intelligible across all Germanic lands, which helped the work quickly reach a wide audience. The sermon swept through the major centres of the Holy Roman Empire, and the broader reading public first came to know something of Luther through it. It has been described as "the world's first printed bestseller".)

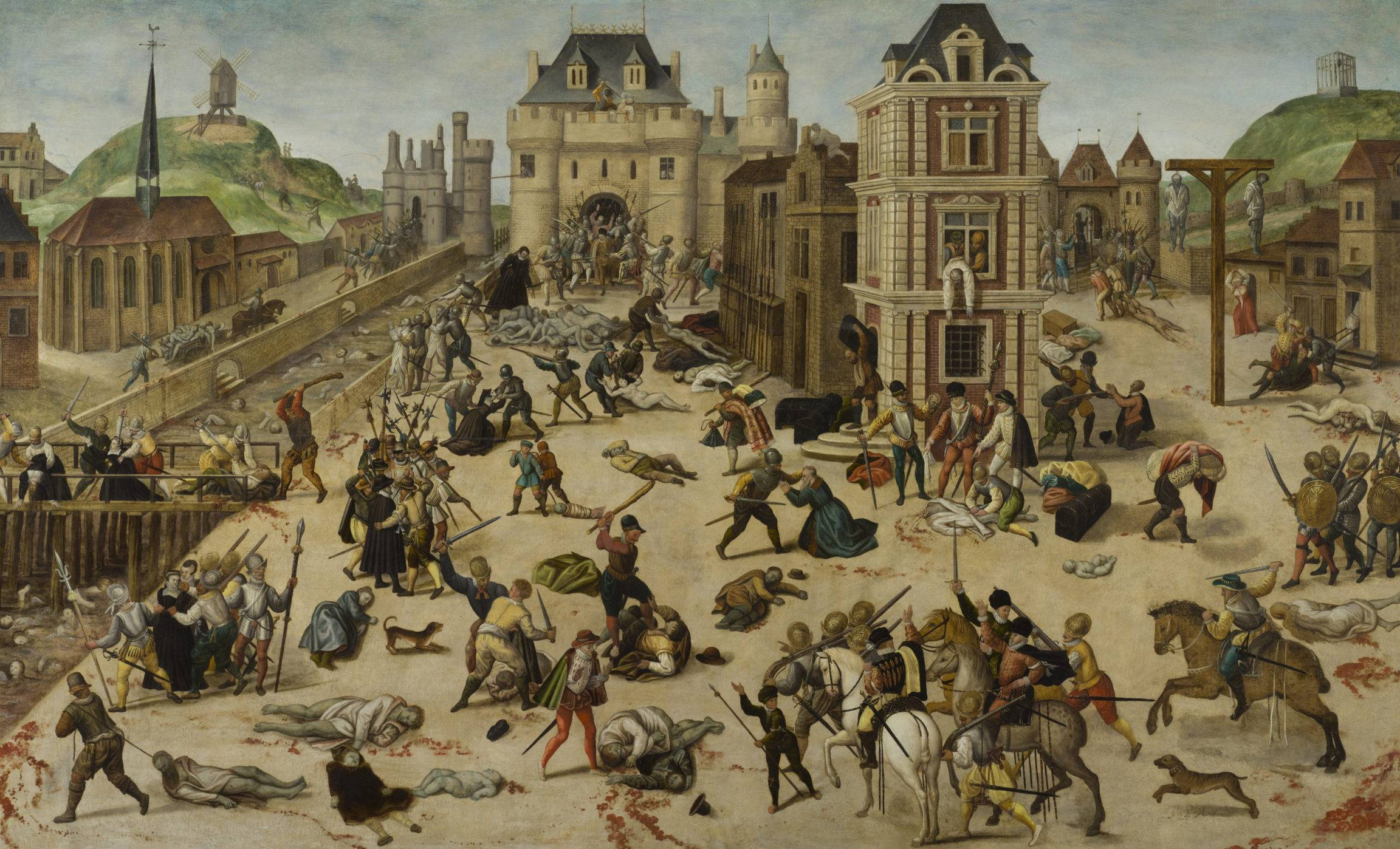
The Saint Bartholomew's Day massacre (1572) during the French Wars of Religion. (Note: The massacre included a targeted group of assassinations and a wave of mob violence directed against the Huguenots (French Calvinist Protestants). Pope Gregory XIII (r. 1572-1585) celebrated the massacres with a Te Deum mass and commissioned three frescoes in the Sala Regia hall of the Vatican depicting the events painted by Giorgio Vasari. A commemorative medal was issued with Gregory's portrait and on the obverse a chastising angel, sword in hand and the legend UGONOTTORUM STRAGES ("Overthrow of the Huguenots").)

The Union of Utrecht (1579) was a mutual defense alliance against Habsburg rule that preceded the independent Dutch Republic.

Sparked by the German priest Martin Luther’s (1483–1546) Sermon on Indulgences and Grace (1518) and spread by the new movable type printing press in vernacular languages (i.e. not Latin), the Protestant Reformation was a religious and political challenge to the Catholic Church. In 1527, mutinous troops of the Habsburg (Note: Frederick III (r. 1452–1493) was the first Holy Roman Emperor from the House of Habsburg.) Holy Roman Emperor Charles V (r. 1519-1556) – many of them fervent Protestant converts – sacked Rome, imprisoned Pope Clement VII (r. 1523–1534), humiliated the Church, and decimated Rome’s population, which plummeted from over 55,000 to barely 10,000 through a combination of massacre, starvation, and plague. As the movement branched into Lutheranism, Calvinism, and Anglicanism, it triggered the Catholic Counter-Reformation, reshaped Europe’s political landscape and exploded into nearly two centuries of religious wars. States were also torn apart internally by religious strife fostered by their external enemies, a fate suffered by France between 1562 and 1598 and the Habsburg Netherlands from 1568 to 1648 (the "Eighty Years' War"). (Note: Seven Dutch provinces made an alliance in 1579 and formed the Dutch Republic (or "Republic of the United Netherlands") in 1588 during the Eighty Years' War.)

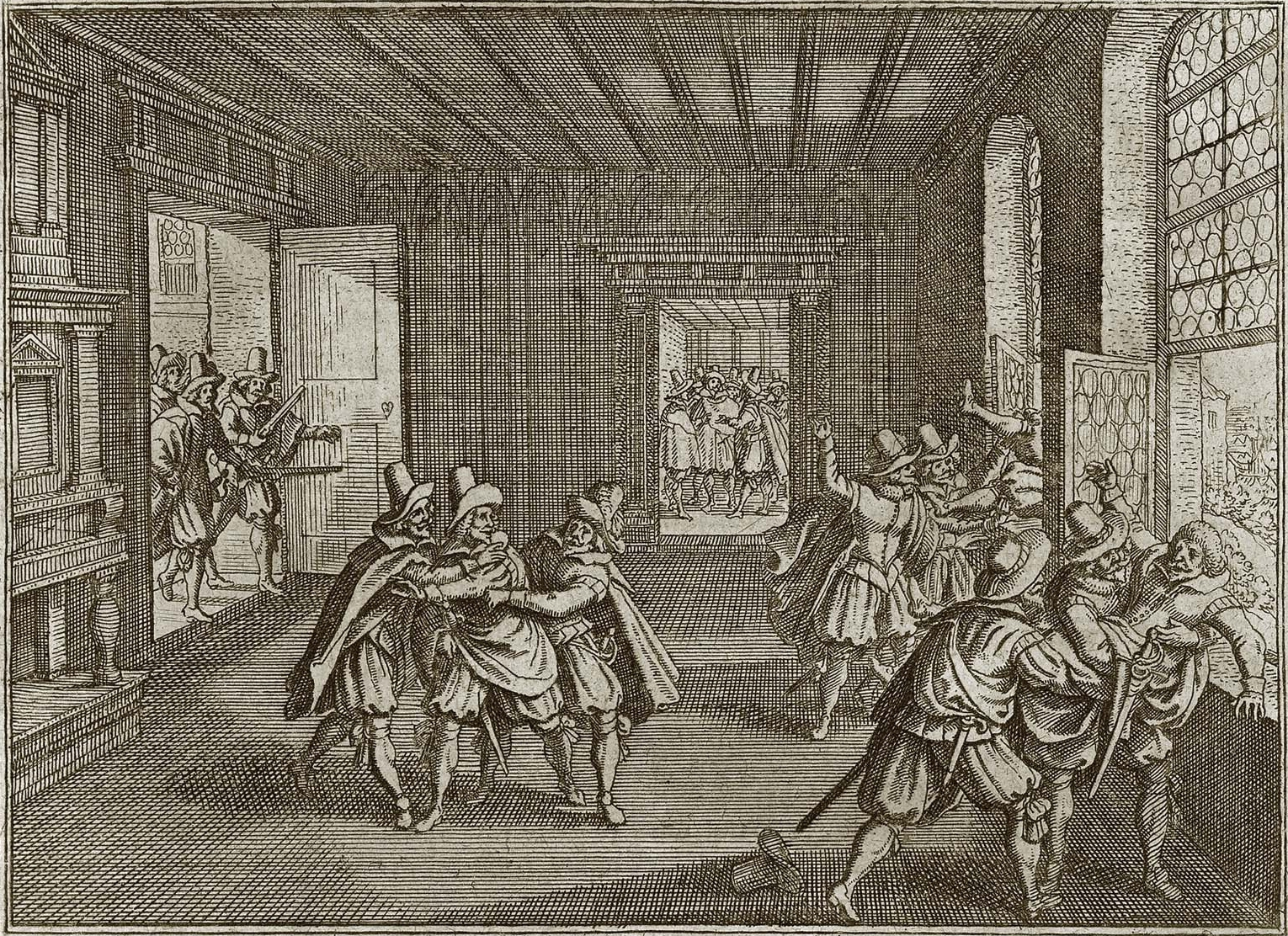
The Second Defenestration of Prague (1618) began the Bohemian Revolt and the Thirty Years’ War (contemporary woodcut).

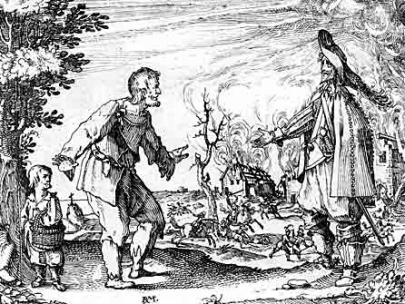
A peasant begs for mercy in front of his burning farm. By the 1630s, being caught in the open by soldiers from either side was "tantamount to a death sentence".

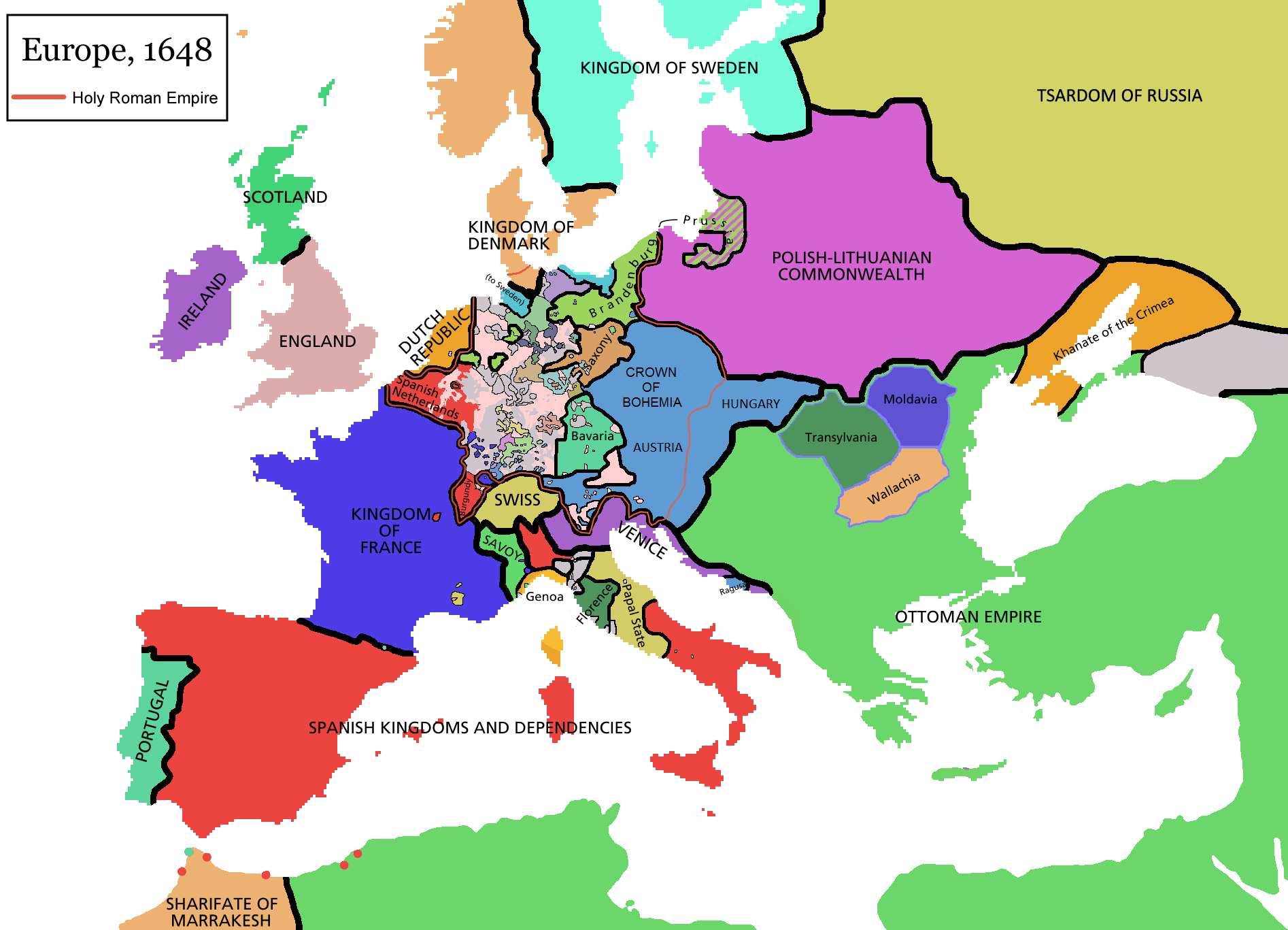
Europe after the Peace of Westphalia in 1648.

During the Thirty Years' War (1618–1648), entire regions of the German states and, to a lesser extent, the Low Countries, the Crown of Bohemia and northern parts of Italy were scavenged bare by foraging armies, causing widespread famine, while bankrupting many of the states involved. Between one-fourth and one-third of the German population perished from direct military causes or from disease and starvation (Note: The modern consensus is that the population of the Holy Roman Empire declined from 18 to 20 million in 1600 to 11–13 million in 1650, and did not regain pre-war levels until 1750.) as social order disintegrated. Between 4 and 8 million people died due to the war, the vast majority being civilians, making it the most devastating European conflict until the 20th century. The Peace of Westphalia (1648) ending the war guaranteed the right to practice Catholicism, Lutheranism and Calvinism as well as the independence of the religiously tolerant Dutch Republic, which established a safe haven for European Jews.

=== Scientific Revolution ===
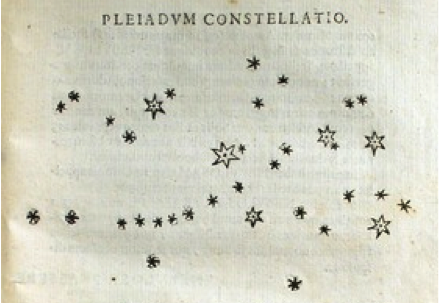
Galileo Galilei reported in the Starry Messenger (1610) that he saw at least ten times more stars through a telescope than are visible to unaided vision.

Newton's cannonball: Whether a cannonball is a terrestrial or celestial object depends only on how fast it is going, from A Treatise of the System of the World (1728).

Italian astronomer Galileo Galilei’s (1564–1642) early 17th-century telescopic observations began the transformation of what had been a narrowly technical revision of classical astronomy into an increasingly aggressive challenge to traditional cosmology and its long-standing synthesis with Christian theology. (Note: In Aristotle's cosmology, Earth was the realm of imperfection, inconstancy, irregularity, and change while the heavens (Moon, Sun, planets, stars) were perfect, permanent, unchangeable and, in religious thought, the realm of heavenly beings.) (Note: In the "Galileo affair", a panel of the Roman Inquisition condemned Galileo's ideas in 1616 and a trial in 1632 sentenced him to house arrest and a ban on his books.) English mathematical physicist Isaac Newton’s (1643–1727) Philosophiæ Naturalis Principia Mathematica (1687) dissolved the ancient boundary between the celestial and the terrestrial by showing how a single mathematical law – the law of universal gravitation – ruled both realms, the first great unification of physics.

The upheaval of the Scientific Revolution ended the medieval view of natural philosophy as the servant (or "handmaiden") of theology. As natural philosophy continued to grow in power, self-confidence and independence during the 17th century, the intellectual attitude of educated people shifted from fides quaerens intellectum toward a mode of understanding increasingly detached from religion. The "New Science" that emerged by the end of the century broke sharply with the natural philosophy that had preceded it, departed from previous Greek conceptions and traditions, was more mechanistic in its worldview and more integrated with mathematics, and was obsessed with the acquisition and interpretation of new evidence.

=== Great powers ===
During the 1640s and 1650s, England endured civil war (1642–1651), the Spanish Empire fractured from simultaneous revolts in Portugal (1640–1668) and Catalonia (1640–1659), and the Polish–Lithuanian Commonwealth faced near-extinction from a Cossack rebellion (1648–1657), the Polish–Russian War (1654–1667) and Swedish invasion (1655–1660). The failure of the Ottoman Empire's second and last attempt to capture the Habsburg capital of Vienna (1683) (Note: The Ottomans' first attempt was in 1529.) (Note: The siege was broken by the largest cavalry charge in history led by (despite efforts by the King of France to prevent his assistance) the king of the Polish-Lithuanian Commonwealth.) resulted in the loss of Hungary to the Habsburgs (1699) and marked the end of Ottoman expansion into Europe.

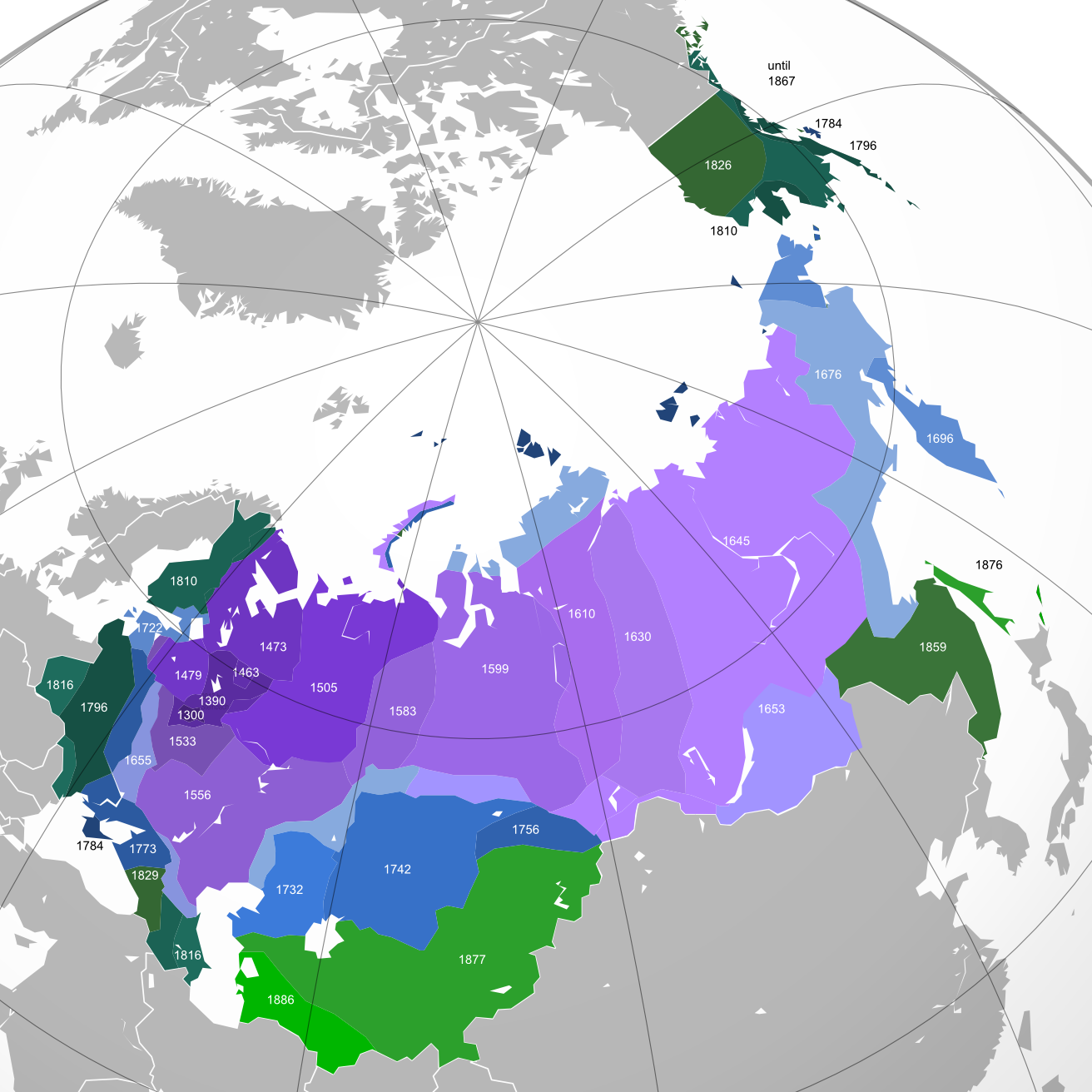
Territorial evolution of Russia (1300–1914) (Note: Russia conquered the Kazan (1552), Astrakhan (1556) and Sibir (1598) khanates and the rest of Siberia (1581–1778). It also fought 12 Russo-Turkish wars between 1568 and 1918.)

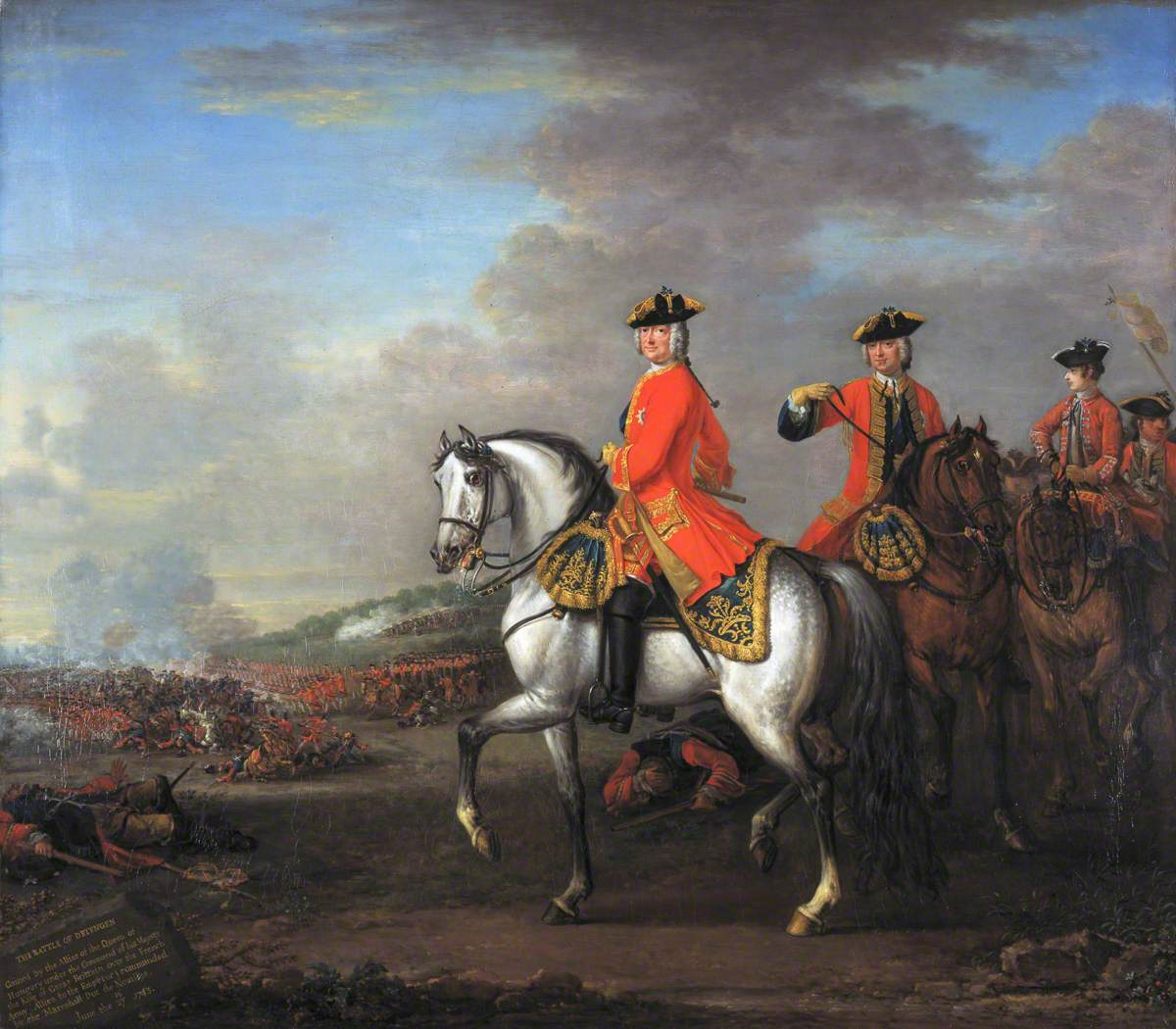
George II was the last reigning British monarch to lead soldiers in combat in 1743.

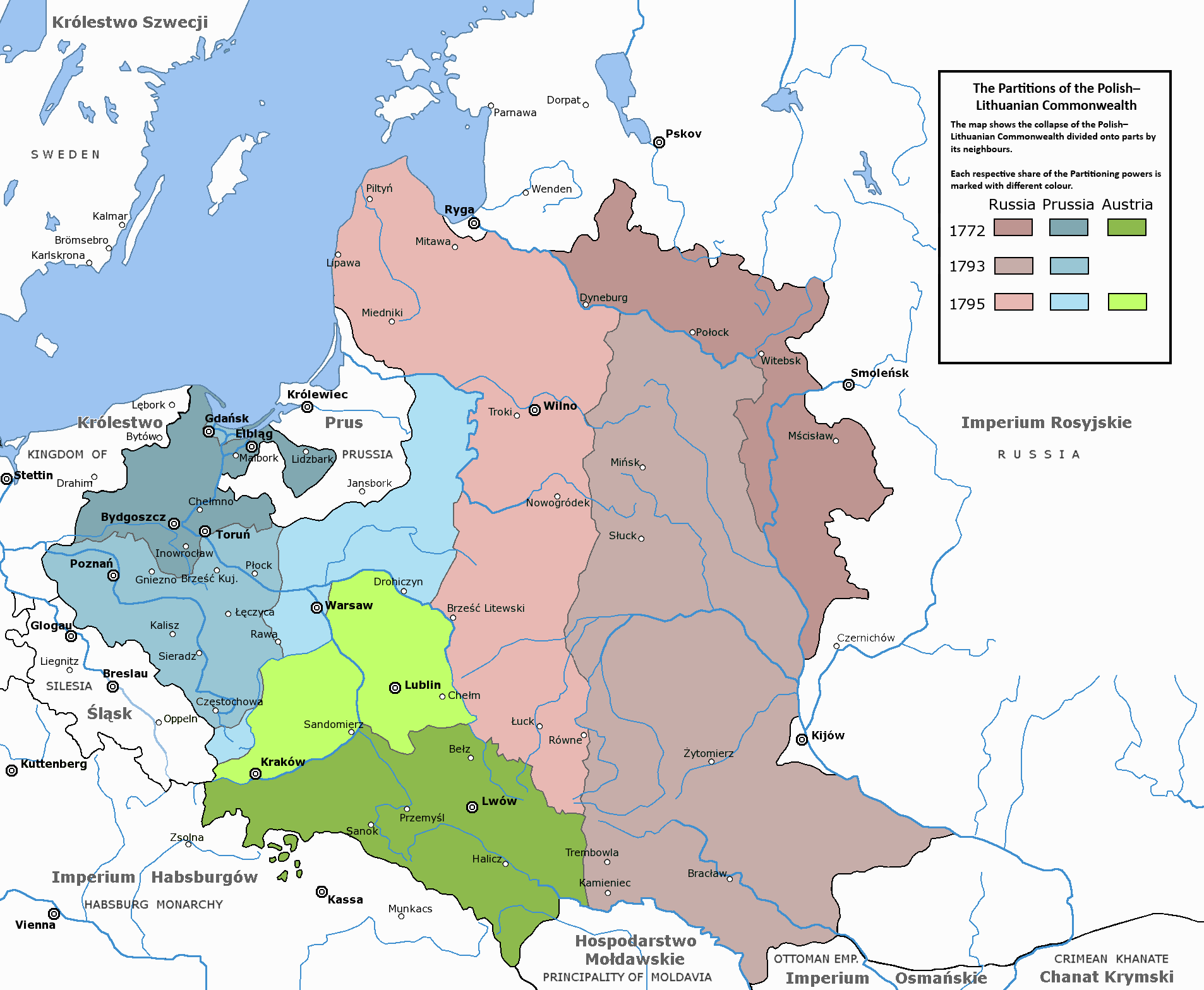
The 1772, 1793 and 1795 partitions that extinguished the Polish-Lithuanian Commonwealth: Russian (brown), Austrian (green) and Prussian (blue).

Largely spared from the devastation of the Thirty Years' War, France was the leading European power at the end of the 17th century. (Note: No European state exceeded it in population or could match its wealth and professional army.) England, however, had surpassed Italy to have the most productive economy in the world and the Glorious Revolution (1688) - which subjected the English crown to Parliament – sparked a Financial Revolution that made the country into a more creditworthy borrower than its absolutist rivals on the Continent whose unchecked monarchs were considered poorer credit risks by lenders. (Note: Philip II of Spain defaulted on loans in 1557, 1560, 1575 and 1596. Lenders had no power over the King and could not force him to repay his loans. Subsequent Spanish kings defaulted six more times in the next 65 years.) These economic and financial advantages over France were tested in the War of the Spanish Succession (1701–1714), in which a pan-European coalition (Note: Pro-Habsburg Spain: Holy Roman Empire; Great Britain; Dutch Republic; Prussia (from 1702); Portugal (from 1702); Savoy (from 1703)) united to oppose France, Britain (Note: The Kingdom of England became the Kingdom of Great Britain in 1707.) won the strategic ports of Gibraltar and Minorca, and the country was set on a course towards "maritime, commercial, and financial supremacy."

The decline of the previously powerful Polish-Lithuanian Commonwealth, Ottoman Empire and Kingdom of Sweden was mirrored by the ascent of three centralized, absolutist monarchies: the Habsburg monarchy ("Austria"), the Tsardom of Russia (Note: Russian Empire after 1721) and Brandenburg–Prussia. (Note: Kingdom of Prussia after 1701) Following the administrative and military models of France's Louis XIV the "Sun King" (r. 1643–1715), these states built the strong armies and large bureaucracies that the escalating costs of gunpowder warfare demanded (Note: See this discussion of the European "Military Revolution".) and expanded at the expense of their neighbors. Sweden yielded territory to Russia and the Tsar of Russia became Emperor Peter the Great (r. Russia 1682–1725) of the Russian Empire in 1721 while Catherine the Great's (r. 1762–1796) reforms caused the Empire to develop into a major European power. (Note: Russia boasted a large and powerful army and a large and complex bureaucracy but throughout the 18th century it remained "a poor, backward, overwhelmingly agricultural, and illiterate country.") Frederick the Great (r. Prussia 1740–1786) improved the Prussian army and took Silesia from Austria (1740–1742). (Note: He also issued the Potato Edict.) Finally, the Polish-Lithuanian Commonwealth was carved up between the three rising powers (1772–1795).

The five great European powers that emerged in the 18th century – Austria, France, Prussia, Russia, and the United Kingdom (Note: The Kingdom of Great Britain became the United Kingdom of Great Britain and Ireland in 1801.) – formed the Concert of Europe that dominated European politics in the 19th century and up to World War I.

=== Enlightenment ===
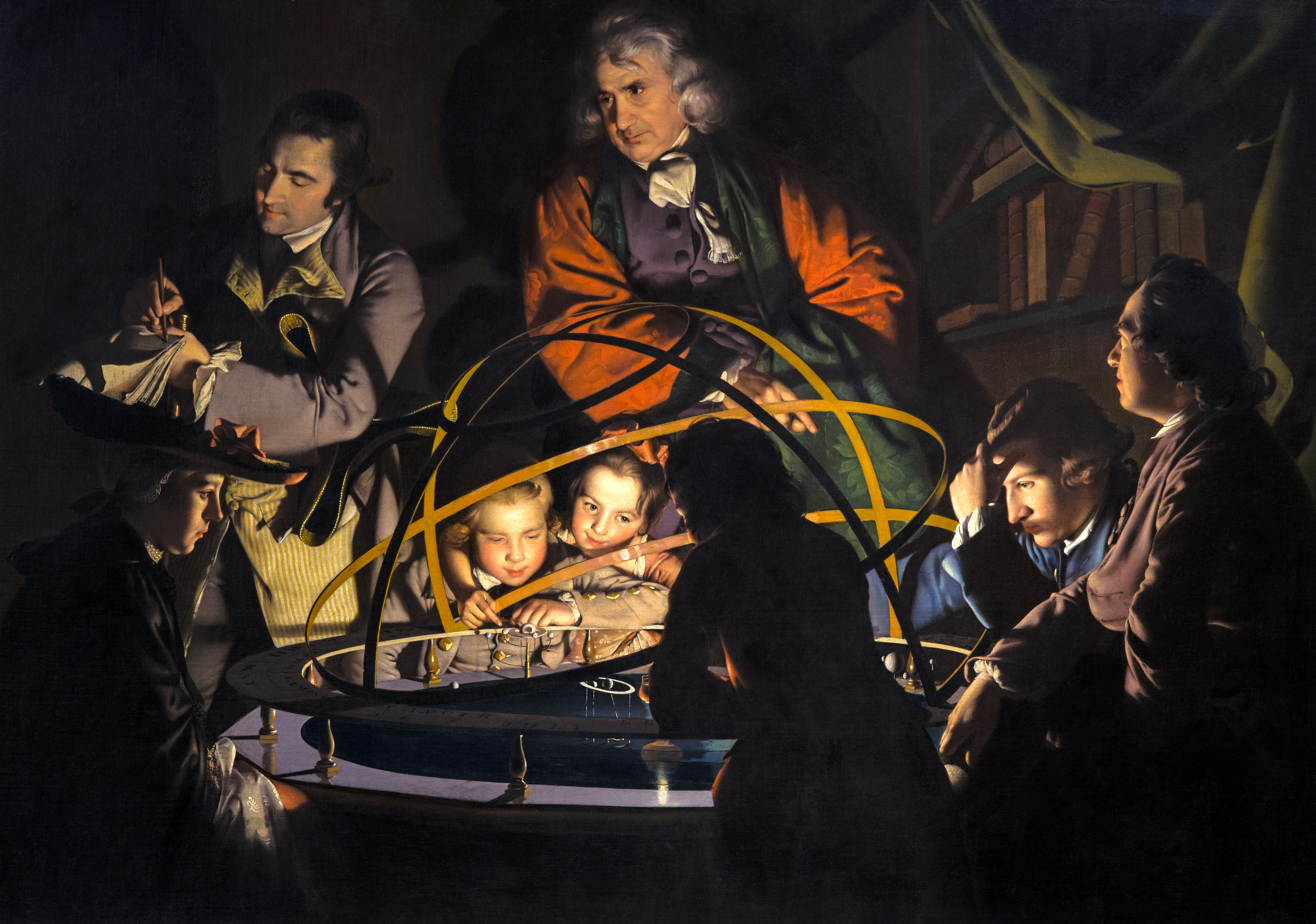
A Philosopher Lecturing on the Orrery, c. 1766

The Age of Enlightenment (also "Age of Reason" or simply "the Enlightenment") was a period of intellectual and cultural flourishing that emerged in the late 17th century in Western Europe and reached its peak in the 18th century as its ideas spread more widely across Europe. Characterized by an emphasis on reason, empirical evidence, and the scientific method, the Enlightenment promoted ideals of individual liberty, religious tolerance, progress, and natural rights. Its thinkers advocated for constitutional government, the separation of church and state, and the application of rational principles to social and political reform. The movement was characterized by the widespread circulation of ideas through new institutions: scientific academies, literary salons, coffeehouses, Masonic lodges, and an expanding print culture of books, journals, and pamphlets. The ideas of the Enlightenment undermined the authority of the monarchy and religious officials and paved the way for the political revolutions of the 18th and 19th centuries. A variety of 19th-century movements, including liberalism, socialism, and neoclassicism, trace their intellectual heritage to the Enlightenment.

According to the Maddison Project, Italy (green line) was the most productive region of Europe in 1500 (GDP per capita) and Britain (black line) the leader by 1800 but it was the 19th century that experienced a historically unprecedented explosion of productivity.

== Industrial Revolution ==
The Industrial Revolution was the most significant transition in human civilization since the Agricultural Revolution. It was the first breakthrough from an agrarian, handicraft economy to one dominated by industry and machine manufacture, initiating unprecedented, cumulative and self-sustaining advances in technology and economic productivity during which Western Europe definitively emerged as the world's most powerful civilization, eclipsing all of its Eurasian rivals.

Origins of the Industrial Revolution
▸ Coke: 1 Coke Smelting / Coalbrookdale (1709)
▸ Steel: 2 Crucible steel / Sheffield (c. 1740s)
▸ Cotton: 3 Flying Shuttle / Bury (1733); 4 Spinning jenny / Oswaldtwistle (1764); 5 Water frame / Cromford (1769); 6 Spinning mule / Bolton (1779); 8 Power Loom / Doncaster (1785)
▸ Engines: 7 Watt’s condenser / Birmingham (1781)

Originating in Britain in the mid-18th century with the mechanisation of textile manufacturing, advancements in iron-making and increased use of coal, it subsequently spread to Western Europe. Technological advancements, most notably the steam engine, accelerated and sustained the industrialisation process. Trade expansion was enabled by the introduction of canals, improved roads, and railways. The introduction of steam power (fuelled primarily by coal) and powered machinery (mainly in textile manufacturing) underpinned the dramatic increases in production capacity.

The development of all-metal machine tools in the first two decades of the 19th century facilitated the manufacture of more production machines for manufacturing in other industries. The effects spread throughout Western Europe and North America during the 19th century, eventually affecting most of the world.

The Industrial Revolution was the first time population and per-person income rose simultaneously. Europe's population increased from 100 million in 1700 to 400 million by 1900.

== Long 19th century ==
During the "long 19th century" (1789–1914), Europe was transformed by the Industrial Revolution and by the political upheavals of the French Revolution, Napoleonic Wars, the rise of nationalism, the revolutions of 1848 and German unification.

=== French Revolution ===
Three Estates of France, political cartoon (1789)

The storming of the Bastille (1789)

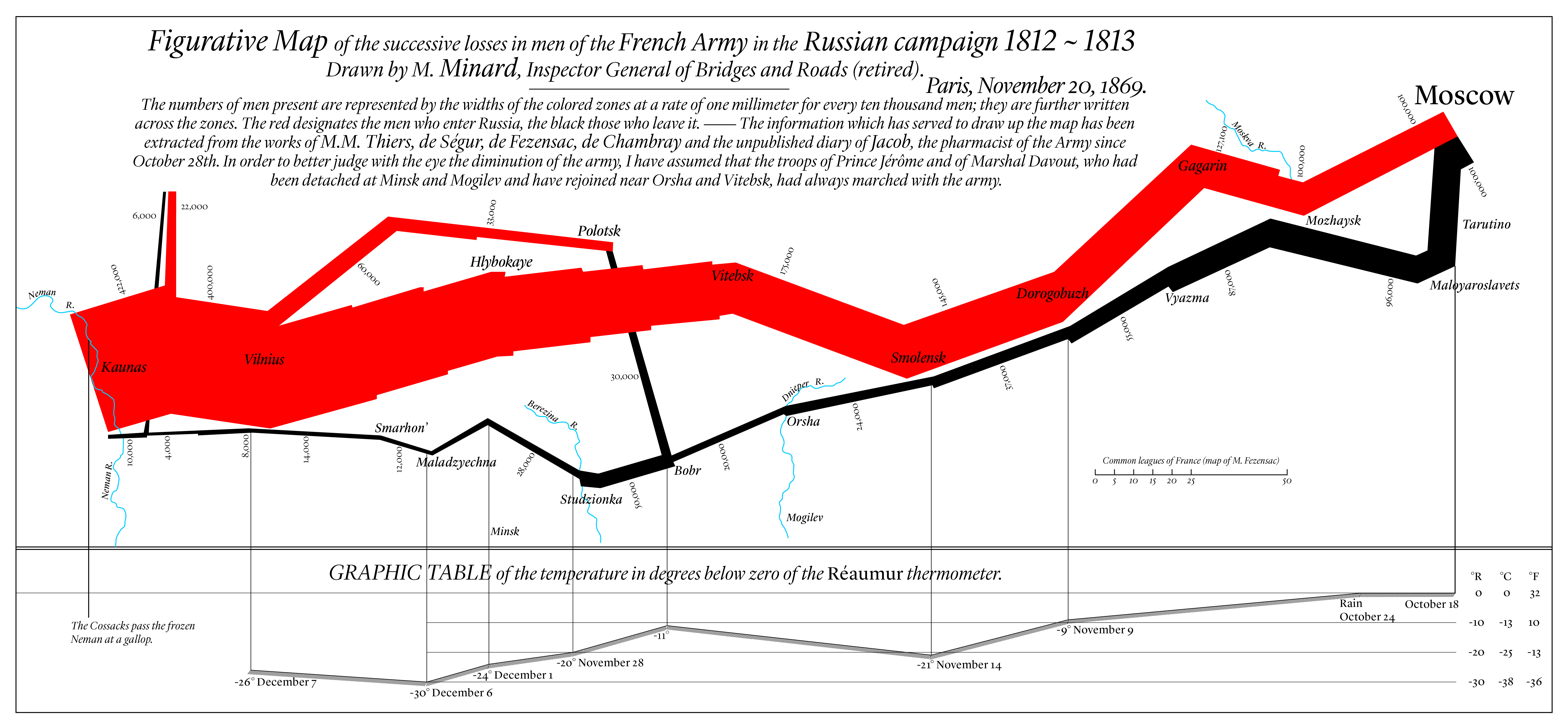
Line thickness illustrating size of Napoleon's army during French invasion of Russia (1812) (Note: The French civil engineer Charles Joseph Minard (1781–1870) published a map of the successive losses of soldiers of the French Army in the 1812 Russian campaign. The 1869 graphic is notable for its representation in two dimensions of six types of data: the number of Napoleon's troops; distance; temperature; the latitude and longitude; direction of travel; and location relative to specific dates. The American statistician Edward Tufte described the graphic as perhaps "the best statistical graphic ever drawn.")

After France's costly intervention in the American Revolutionary War and repeated failed attempts, in 1789 King Louis XVI (r. 1774–1792) summoned the Estates-General – a representative body comprising the medieval "estates" of clergy, nobility and commoners – to help solve France's fiscal crisis. The Third Estate, joined by some members of the other two, declared itself a National Assembly. (Note: When the King used soldiers to lock them out of their meeting place, they instead met in a nearby indoor tennis court and swore the Tennis Court Oath to stay united until a constitution was established.) After the storming of the Bastille on 14 July, the Assembly passed the Declaration of the Rights of Man and of the Citizen, (Note: Initially drafted by the Marquis de Lafayette with assistance from Thomas Jefferson.) abolished feudalism, sought complete control over the Catholic Church in France, banned guilds and approved France's first written constitution, briefly turning France into a constitutional monarchy. The French Revolutionary Army's unexpected victory over an Austro-Prussian invasion emboldened the newly assembled National Convention to abolish the monarchy and make France a republic in 1792. (Note: The National Convention sentenced the former king to death, created the Committee of Public Safety (which executed tens of thousands of people in Paris during the Reign of Terror) and mandated the levée en masse (the first modern system of near-universal national conscription) in 1793, and abolished colonial slavery in 1794.)

Coalition Wars (1792–1815)
▸ First Coalition (1792–97): 1 Valmy (1792) & 2 Fleurus (1794)
▸ Second Coalition (1798–1802): 3 The Pyramids (1798), 4 The Nile (1798), 5 18 Brumaire (1799) & 6 Marengo (1800)
▸ Third Coalition (1803–06): 7 Trafalgar (1805) & 8 Austerlitz (1805)
▸ Fourth Coalition (1806–07): 9 Fall of Berlin (1806)
▸ Peninsular War: 10 Bailén (1808) & 14 Vitoria (1813)
▸ Fifth Coalition (1809): 11 Aspern–Essling (1809)
▸ French invasion of Russia (1812): 12 Borodino (1812) & 13 Fire of Moscow (1812)
▸ Sixth Coalition (1812–14): 14 Vitoria (1813), 15 Leipzig (1813) & 5 Fall of Paris (1814)
▸ Seventh Coalition (1815): 2 Waterloo (1815)

Following the French general Napoleon Bonaparte’s 1796 invasion of Italy and the 1798 French invasion of Switzerland, a network of satellite states replaced previous regimes. (Note: Including the Transpadane, Cisalpine, Ligurian, Roman, Neapolitan, and Helvetic republics.) In 1799 during the War of the Second Coalition, Napoleon abandoned a French army in Egypt, (Note: The French army in Egypt surrendered to the British in 1801.) returned to Paris, overthrew the leadership of the Republic and then crowned himself Emperor in 1804. Despite crushing victories at Austerlitz (1805) and Jena (1806) ending both the third and fourth coalitions, however, his empire later collapsed following an invasion of Russia, a disastrous retreat from Moscow (1812) and a decisive defeat at Leipzig (1813). (Note: Involving 560,000 soldiers, 2,200 artillery pieces, the expenditure of 400,000 rounds of artillery ammunition, and 133,000 casualties, the Battle of Leipzig, also known as the Battle of the Nations, was the single largest battle of the Napoleonic Wars.)

French politics were permanently polarized after the Revolution – new names were given, "left" and "right", for the supporters and opponents of the principles of the Revolution. French-controlled areas abolished feudal privileges and seigneurial dues, liberalised property laws, ended the guilds of merchants and craftsmen to facilitate entrepreneurship, reduced trade barriers, legalised divorce, closed Jewish ghettos and emancipated Jewish populations, and introduced the metric system. (Note: The popular historian Andrew Roberts argues that "meritocracy, equality before the law, property rights, religious toleration, modern secular education, sound finances, and so on-were protected, consolidated, codified, and geographically extended by Napoleon during his 16 years of power.") Italy and Switzerland both experienced radical change while the replacement of the thousand-year-old Holy Roman Empire with the Confederation of the Rhine (1806-1813) ignited German nationalism.

=== Concert of Europe ===
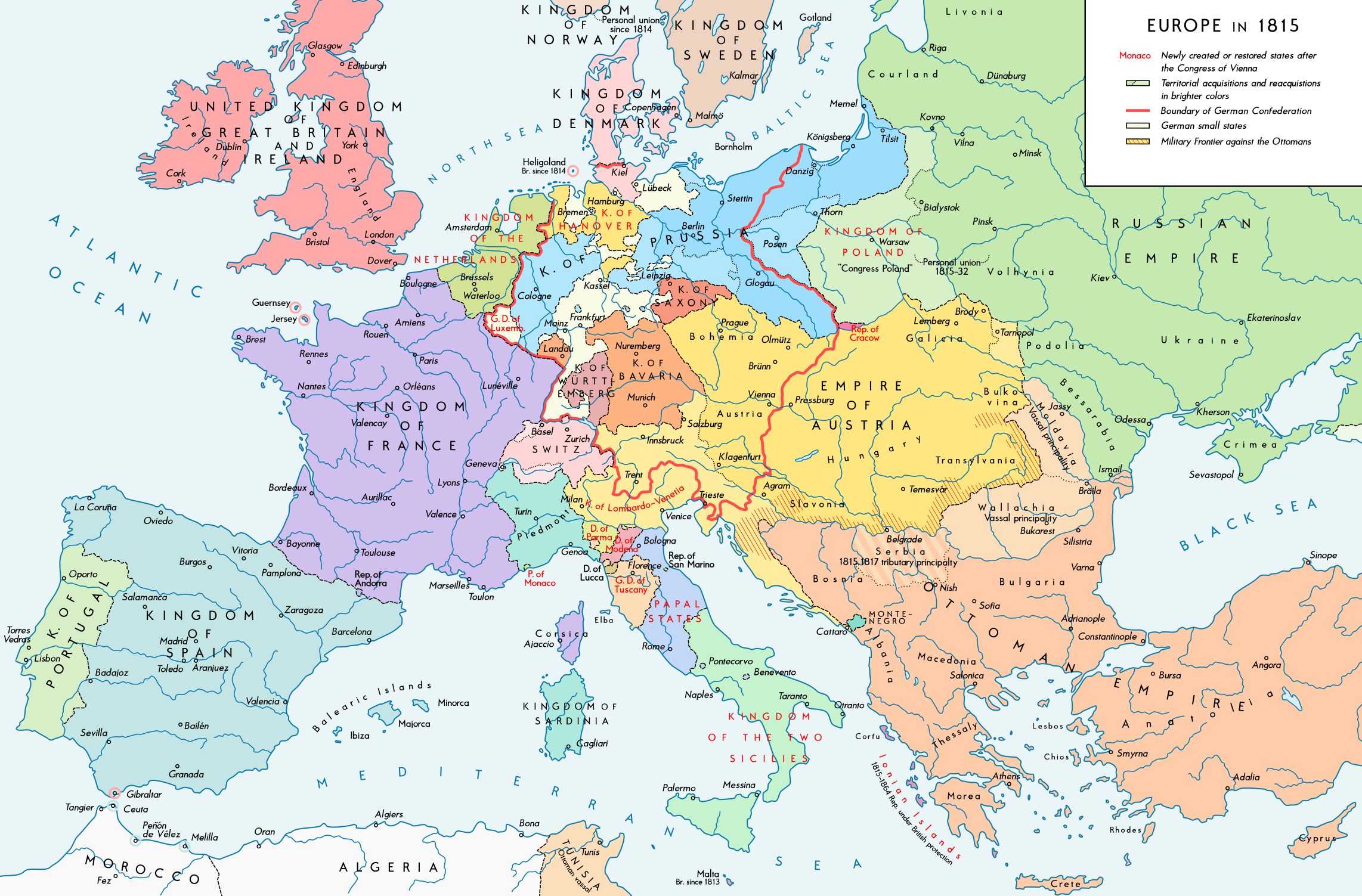
European borders set by the Congress of Vienna, 1815

At the Congress of Vienna (1814–1815), the great European powers agreed to massive territorial changes in Central and Eastern Europe and to maintain a European balance of power, initially intended to be managed with regular meetings between them. (Note: The formal "Congress System" fell apart in the 1820s but peace between the Great Powers continued until the Crimean War (1853–1856). Occasional meetings reminiscent of the Congresses continued to be held at times of crisis.)

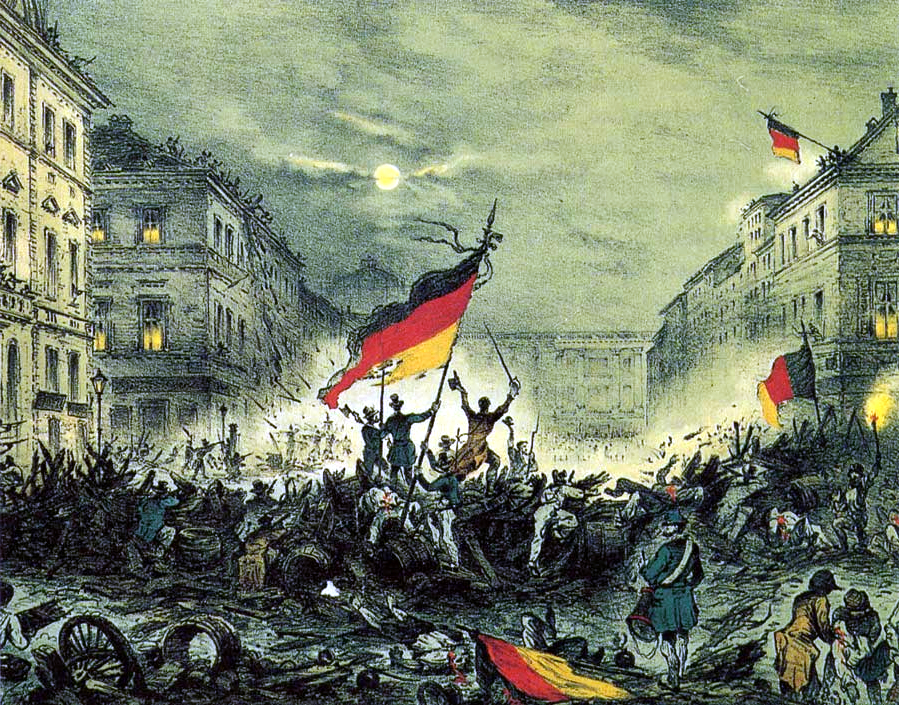
Cheering revolutionaries in Berlin in March 1848

Beginning with uprisings in Sicily and France, the revolutions of 1848 became the most widespread revolutionary wave in European history. In Paris, street fighting forced the abdication of the king and the proclamation of the French Second Republic (1848–1852), a fast collapse of a great power monarchy that emboldened both liberals and nationalists and encouraged demands for both constitutions and nation states. While Denmark transitioned peacefully to a constitutional monarchy and Sardinia-Piedmont secured the Statuto Albertino (later the constitution of a united Italy), conservative reaction triumphed almost everywhere else. In France, the Second Republic curdled into authoritarian rule and then the Second French Empire (1852–1870). (Note: Promising to stabilize the chaotic political situation, Napoleon III, the nephew of Napoleon I, was elected president of the Second French Republic and then, like his uncle, arranged a rigged plebiscite to make himself Emperor of the Second French Empire (1852–1870). He suppressed dissent and censored media but also beautified Paris and modernized infrastructure.) Most consequentially, the King of Prussia's rejection of the crown of a "German Empire" offered by the Frankfurt National Assembly – the first freely elected parliament for all German states – suggested to Germans that parliamentary liberalism was incapable of achieving a German nation state, a lesson with far-reaching consequences for Europe.

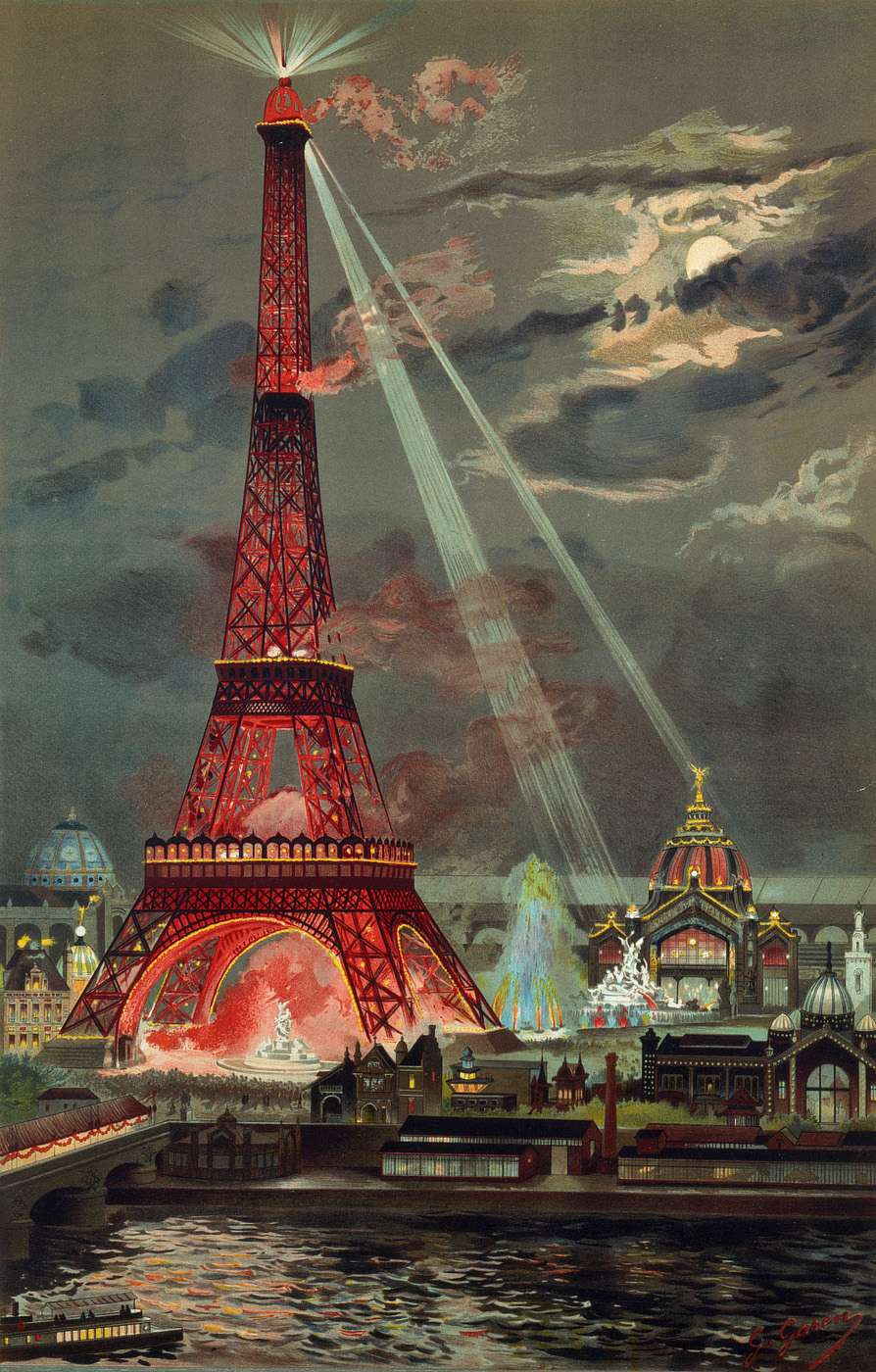
Illumination of the Eiffel Tower at night during the 1889 Paris Exposition, painted by Georges Garen, 1889

Governments increasingly took control of both education and marriage away from churches, abolished taxes and tithes for the support of established religions, and excluded bishops from legislative bodies. In France, hostility to the Catholic Church became a major issue and in Germany in the 1870s there was a fierce Kulturkampf (culture war) against Catholics. Notwithstanding these conflicts and tensions, however, the last decades of the long 19th century – sometimes known as the Belle Époque (1871–1914) – were characterised by unusual political stability in Western and Central Europe. With the notable exception of the Russian Empire, all of Europe's major powers had become constitutional monarchies or republics. For many Europeans, transnational, class-based affiliations were as important as national identities, particularly among aristocrats. (Note: An upper-class gentleman could travel through much of Western Europe without a passport and even reside abroad with minimal bureaucratic regulation.)

Triple Alliance and Triple Entente, 1914

The Franco-Prussian War (1871) that ended a French empire and created a German one also left behind an enmity between France and Germany because of the loss of Alsace-Lorraine. The new German Empire (1871–1918) industrialised rapidly and sought to overtake Britain to become Europe's leading industrial power. In 1882, Otto von Bismarck, the architect of the unification of Germany and chancellor of the Empire, drove the creation of the Triple Alliance, a military alliance of Germany, Austria-Hungary and Italy. In 1907, France, Russia and Britain formed the Triple Entente.

=== Nationalism ===
The most revolutionary political force in 19th-century Europe was nationalism, which emerged initially among the South Slavs and Greeks in the multi-ethnic Ottoman Empire. The success of the anti-Ottoman Serbian Revolution (1804–1817) was followed by the Greek War of Independence (1821–1829), which became a cause for European 'philhellenes' who viewed the Greek conflict as a civilizational battle to free the Greek "cradle of Europe" from a foreign occupier. Closer to the heartland of the Empire, the anti-Ottoman Bulgarian insurrection of 1876, and the Russo-Turkish War (1877–1878) that followed led to the re-establishment of Bulgaria in 1878.

Ethno-linguistic map of Austria-Hungary, 1910.

The Austro-Hungarian Empire had the advantage of size and a large army but rising nationalism acted as a powerful centrifugal force that strained the multi-ethnic fabric of the Empire, fostering internal dissent and demands for self-determination that progressively undermined the stability of Habsburg rule. In the Hungarian Revolution of 1848, Hungarian nationalists battled Austria only finally losing when Russia sent some 200,000 troops to restore Habsburg rule. Russia also crushed large nationalist revolts in Congress Poland in 1830 and 1863–64 and attempted to "Russify" Polish language, culture and religion.

French conquests of smaller German and Italian states during the Napoleonic Wars encouraged 19th century demands for national unity. Italian unification (also known as the "Risorgimento") was the consolidation of the seven states of the Italian Peninsula into the Kingdom of Italy in the 1860s, culminating with the end of the Papal States in 1870. Von Bismarck, the Minister President of Prussia in the 1860s leveraged German nationalism and a series of short, decisive wars – including the Franco-Prussian War, which toppled the Second French Empire – to consolidate dozens of German states into the powerful German Empire in 1871.

Under the influence of Spanish nationalism, Spain's 18th century Castilian-centric assimilation policies towards Catalan-speaking territories (Catalonia, Valencia, the Balearic Islands, part of Aragon) and other national minorities accelerated in the 19th century.

Nationalism stimulated the emergence of national educational systems that prioritized the study of national heritage, national language, and patriotic identity over historical accuracy. Compulsory elementary education became standard in Germany and then across Western Europe and then was extended to girls. By the 1890s, strong movements emerged in some countries, including France and Germany, to extend compulsory education to the secondary level.

=== Emigration ===
Pushed by both poverty and the displacement of peasant farming and artisan manufacturing, 20% of Europe's rapidly growing population – 65 million people – emigrated between 1815 and 1939, primarily to the United States, Argentina, Canada and Brazil:

Destination	Years	Arrivals	
United States	1821–1932	32,244,000	Scottish Highland family migrating to New Zealand
Argentina	1856–1932	6,405,000	Scottish Highland family migrating to New Zealand
Canada	1831–1932	5,206,000	Scottish Highland family migrating to New Zealand
Brazil	1818–1932	4,431,000	Scottish Highland family migrating to New Zealand
In 1800, less than 1% of the world population consisted of overseas Europeans and their descendants but by the eve of World War I 38% of the world's total population was of European ancestry.

=== Second Industrial Revolution ===
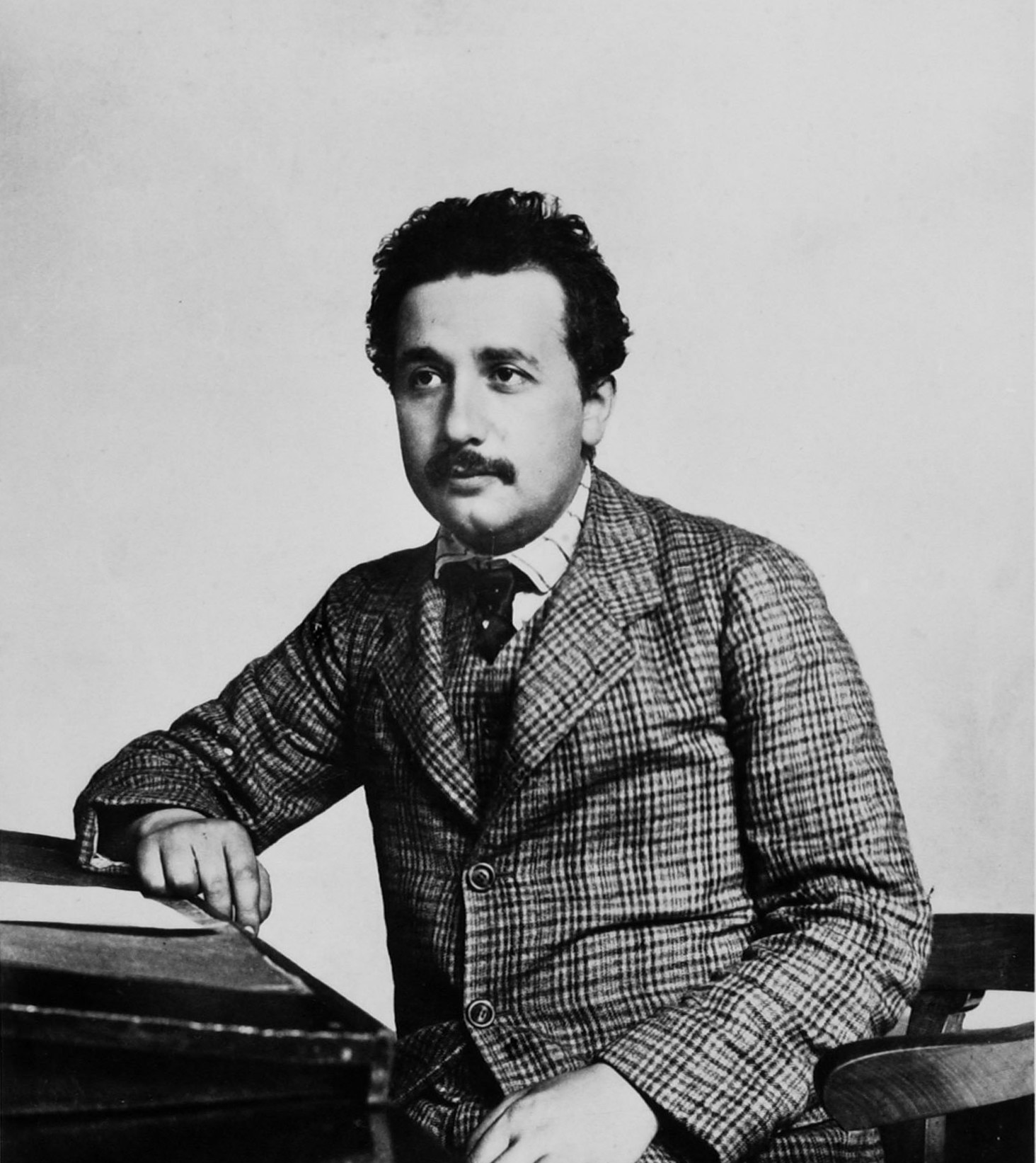
While employed as an examiner at the Swiss patent office in Bern, Albert Einstein (1879–1955) published four major contributions to the foundation of modern physics (including E=mc^{2}) during the annus mirabilis ("miraculous year") of 1905.

The Second Industrial Revolution was a phase of rapid scientific discovery, standardization, mass production and industrialisation that is generally dated between 1870 and 1914.

Although poverty remained pervasive, living standards for lower-class Europeans rose steadily as the century progressed. Wages increased, housing and diets improved, and working hours fell.

Areas of Africa controlled by colonial powers, 1913: Belgium (yellow), United Kingdom (salmon), France (blue), Germany (turquoise), Italy (green), Portugal (purple) and Spain (pink) empires. The only independent states were Liberia and Ethiopia (grey).

=== New Imperialism ===
The Scramble for Africa was the colonisation of Africa from the mid-1870s to World War I by seven Western European powers (Belgium, France, Germany, Italy, Portugal, Spain and the United Kingdom) enabled by new technologies including steamships, railways and telegraphs. The United Kingdom combined naval supremacy and economic and other influence to build a global empire – the largest empire in human history (comprising more than 25% of all land on the planet in 1920) – on which "the sun never set".

== World wars ==
=== World War I ===
At the beginning of the 20th century two rival alliances of European great powers – the Triple Alliance of the German Empire, Austro-Hungarian Monarchy and Kingdom of Italy and the Triple Entente of the French Republic, Russian Empire and United Kingdom (Great Britain) – opposed each other and were committed to come to the aid of their alliance partners. In 1914, Austria-Hungary threatened the Kingdom of Serbia. In response, Russia mobilized to threaten Austria. Germany then mobilized to threaten Russia and preemptively strike France through Belgium while Britain declared war after Germany violated Belgian neutrality.

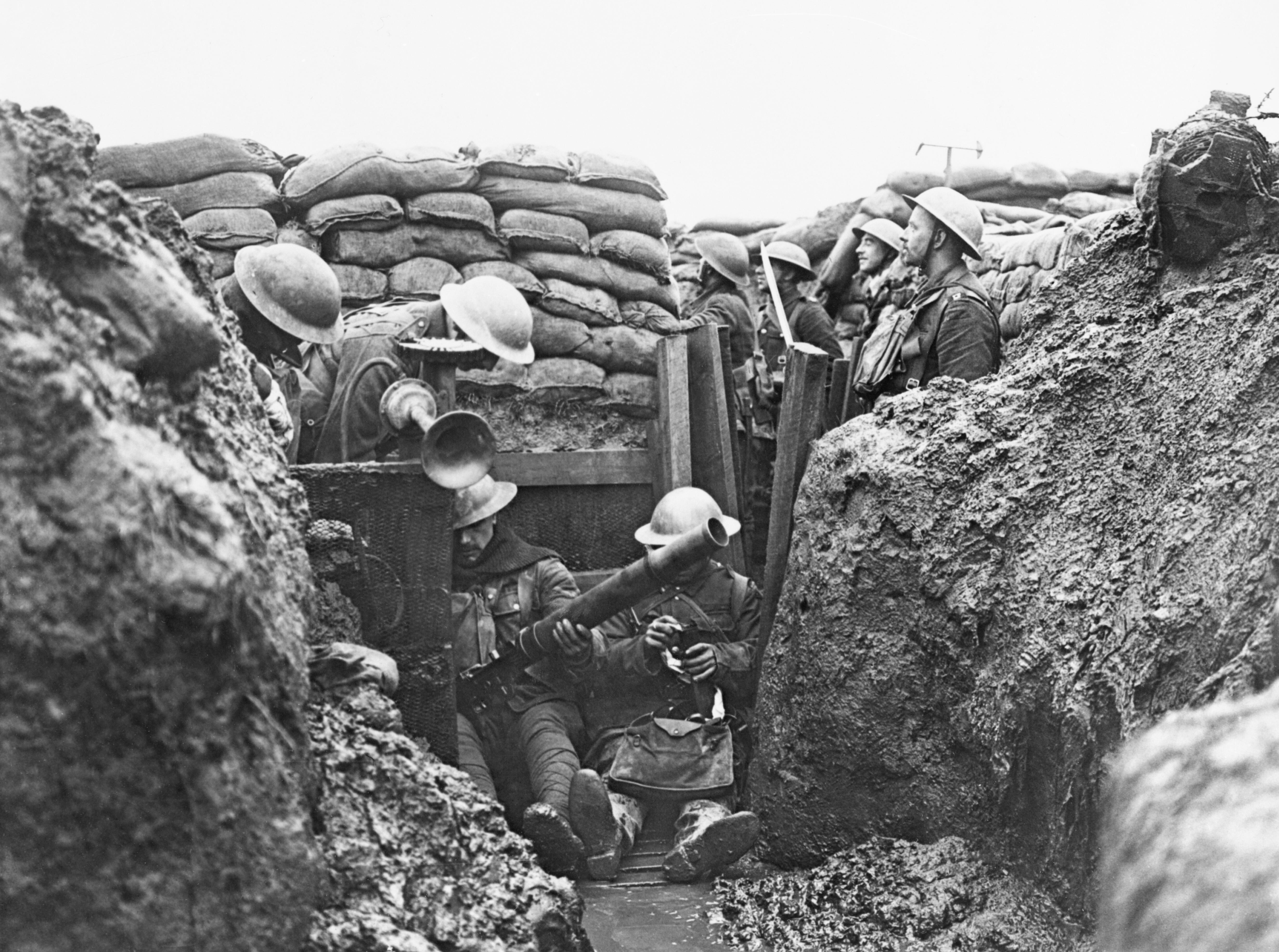
British soldiers in a trench on the Western Front.

Modern armies with machine guns and massive artillery fought indecisively for 3 years from fortified and static trenches on the Western Front. Single battles like Verdun and the Somme killed hundreds of thousands. Russia collapsed in the February Revolution of 1917 and Germany claimed victory on the Eastern Front. The October Revolution brought the Bolsheviks to power, leading to the creation of the Soviet Union. With American entry into the war in 1917, and the failure of Germany's spring 1918 offensive, Germany had run out of manpower. Germany's allies, Austria-Hungary and the Ottoman Empire, surrendered and dissolved, followed by Germany. Over 65 million European soldiers were mobilised from 1914 to 1918; 20 million soldiers and civilians died.

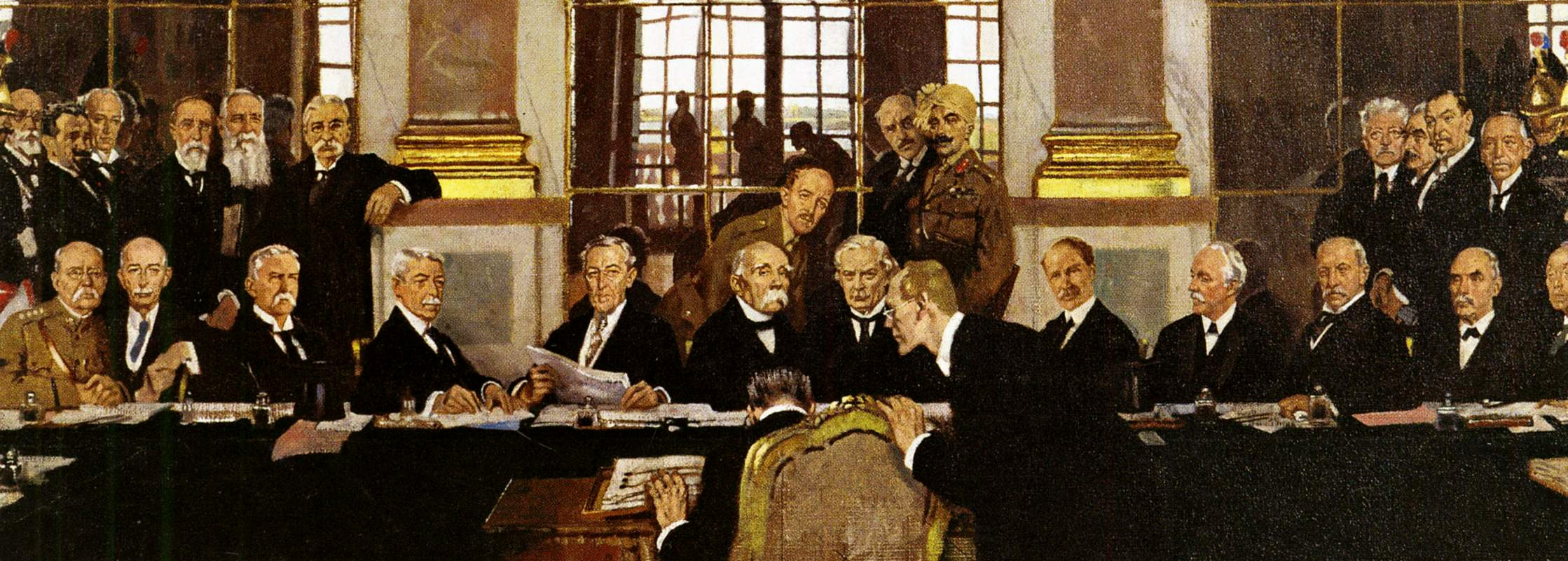
Detail from William Orpen's painting The Signing of Peace in the Hall of Mirrors, Versailles, 28 June 1919, showing the signing of the peace treaty by a minor German official opposite to the representatives of the winning powers

The Treaty of Versailles (1919) significantly reduced Germany's military power and required the nation to accept responsibility for the conflict and pay extensive financial reparations. The conference also created the League of Nations and transferred German and Ottoman territories to the control of Allied powers, chiefly Britain and France, as "mandates". The collapse of the Russian Empire in the First World War enabled the major powers to reestablish an independent Second Polish Republic, which survived until 1939, as well as an independent Finland, Latvia, Lithuania, Estonia and, briefly, independent Ukraine, Armenia, Georgia, and Azerbaijan. Independent nations of Czechoslovakia, Hungary and Yugoslavia were also created in central Europe from the defunct Austro-Hungarian and German empires. Multiple nations were required to sign minority rights treaties.

=== Interwar period ===
The Allied victory in the First World War seemed to mark the triumph of liberalism. (Note: Historian Martin Blinkhorn argues that the liberal themes were ascendant in terms of "cultural pluralism, religious and ethnic toleration, national self-determination, free-market economics, representative and responsible government, free trade, unionism, and the peaceful settlement of international disputes through a new body, the League of Nations.") As early as 1917, however, the emerging liberal order was being challenged by the new communist movement. Communist revolts were beaten back everywhere else, but succeeded in Russia. During the 1920s, democratic institutions were dismantled in Italy, (Note: Italy evolved into a totalitarian state allied with Nazi Germany.) Albania, Poland, Portugal, Lithuania and Yugoslavia.

After the Wall Street crash of 1929, most of the world sank into a Great Depression; prices and profits fell and unemployment soared. The worst hit sectors included heavy industry, export-oriented agriculture, mining and lumbering, and construction. World trade fell by two-thirds.

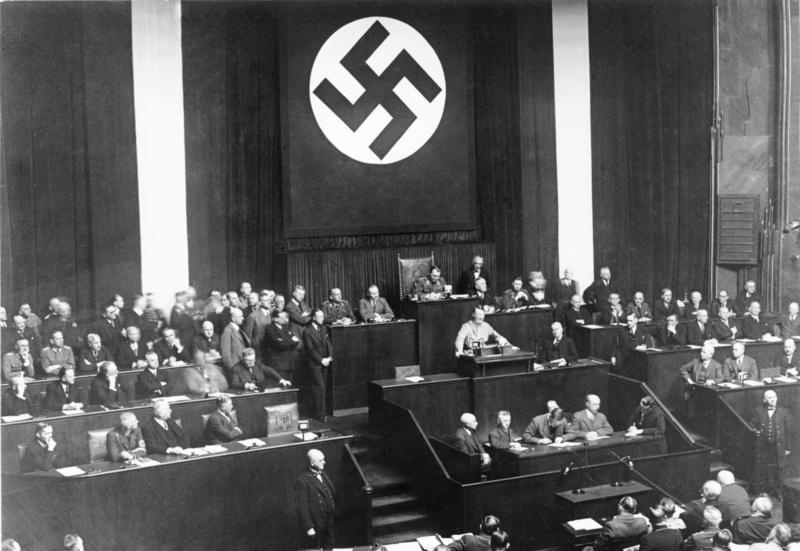
Adolf Hitler's speech on the Enabling Act (1933)

In the 1930s authoritarian regimes ended democracies in Portugal, Austria and Greece. A German fascist party began to transform Germany into a totalitarian state in 1933 and allied with the Empire of Japan in the Anti-Comintern Pact in 1936. The League of Nations failed to resolve any major crises and by 1937 it was largely ignored. Supported by Nazi Germany and Fascist Italy, Nationalist rebels overthrew the Second Spanish Republic in the Spanish Civil War (1936–1939). With acquiescence from Britain and France, Nazi Germany annexed part of Czechoslovakia in 1938, and then occupied the rest of Czechoslovakia, signed the "Pact of Steel" alliance with Fascist Italy and made a non-aggression treaty with the Soviet Union in 1939.

=== World War II ===
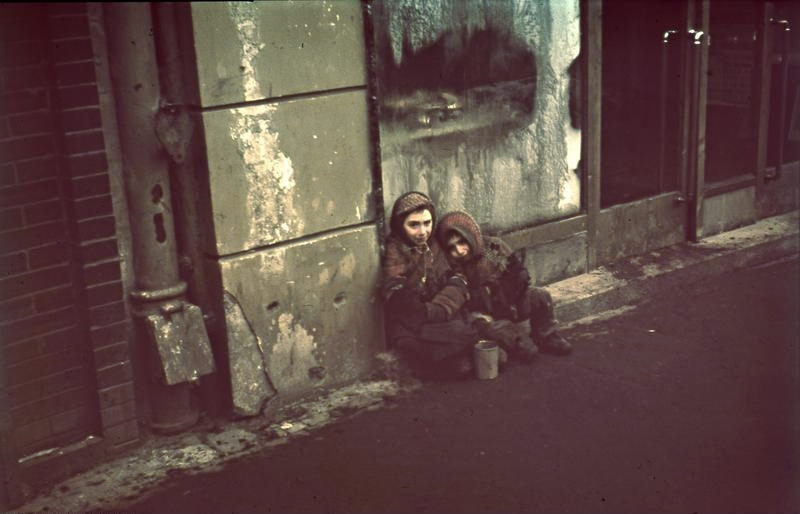
Starving Jewish children in Warsaw Ghetto (1940–1943)

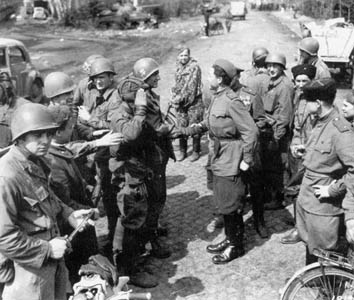
American and Soviet troops meet in April 1945, east of the Elbe River

The German Führer Adolf Hitler launched World War II with invasions of Poland (1939), Denmark (1940), Norway (1940), the Netherlands (1940), and France (1940). Britain defeated Germany's air attacks in the Battle of Britain (1940). The invasion of the Soviet Union began in June 1941. The German Wehrmacht was stopped close to Moscow in December 1941.

Over the next year the Germans started to suffer a series of defeats. War raged between the Axis Powers (Nazi Germany, Fascist Italy, and the Empire of Japan) and the Allied Forces (British Empire, Soviet Union, and the United States). The Allied Forces won in North Africa, invaded Italy in 1943, and liberated France in 1944. In 1945 Germany itself was invaded from the east by the Soviet Union and from the west by the other Allies. The Soviet Red Army conquered the Reichstag in the Battle of Berlin and Germany surrendered.

World War II was the deadliest conflict in human history, causing between 60 and 75 million deaths, the majority of whom were civilians (approximately 38 to 55 million). The period was also marked by systematic genocide. In 1942–1945, separately from the war-related deaths, the Nazis killed over 11 million civilians identified through IBM-enabled censuses, including the majority of the Jews and Gypsies of Europe, millions of Polish and Soviet Slavs, homosexuals, Jehovah's Witnesses, disabled people, and political enemies. Meanwhile, in the 1930s the Soviet system of forced labour, expulsions and allegedly engineered famine had a similar death toll. Millions of civilians were affected by forced population transfers.

== Recent history ==
The world wars ended the pre-eminent position of Britain, France and Germany in Europe and the world.

=== Cold War ===
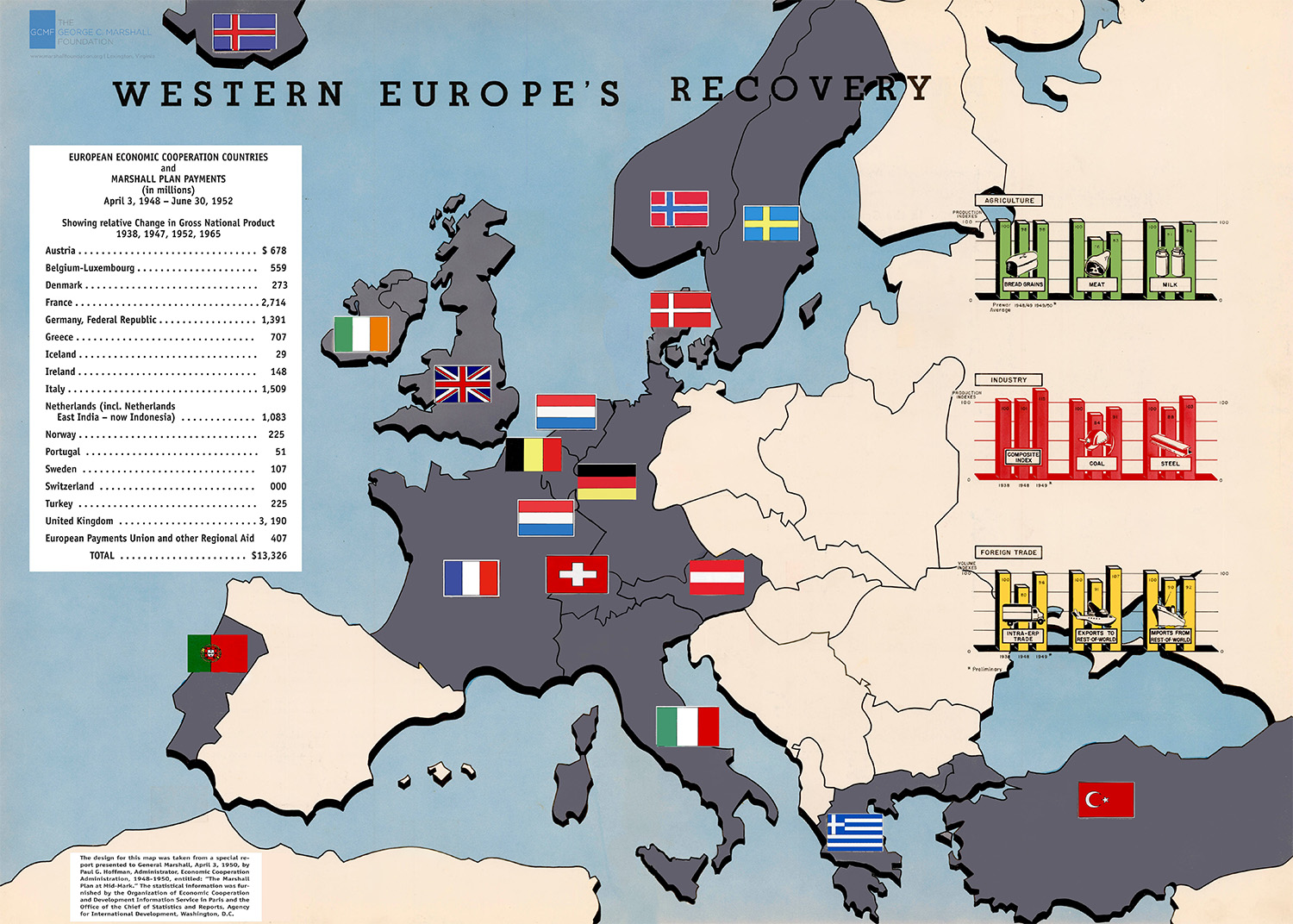
Marshall Plan payments to European countries, 1948–1952

The victors of World War II divided Europe into spheres of influence, with a Western Bloc and an Eastern Bloc of countries opposing each other in the Cold War. The United States donated about $20 billion in Marshall Plan grants and other funding to Western Europe between 1945 and 1951. (Note: Historian Michael J. Hogan argues that American aid was critical in stabilizing European economies and preventing communist invasions or political takeovers. Economic historians Bradford De Long and Barry Eichengreen argue that American aid was more significant for long-term growth than short-term recovery.) The Soviet Union, concentrating on its own recovery, seized and transferred most of Germany's industrial plants and exacted war reparations from, and imposed unfair trading arrangements on, eastern European countries under its control.

The United States and the majority of European liberal democracies established the NATO military alliance in 1949. With the aim of uniting and defending Western Europe, first steps toward economic and political integration began with the Council of Europe (1949–), the European Coal and Steel Community (1952–2002) and European Economic Community (1958–1993). The Soviet Union and its satellites established the Warsaw Pact in 1955. (Note: The Warsaw Pact had a much larger ground force, but the American-French-British nuclear umbrellas protected NATO.)

The peak period of European decolonization occurred in the two decades following World War II. During this window, European colonial powers began a rapid withdrawal from their overseas territories, starting with major Asian nations like India (1947) and Indonesia (1949). In the "Year of Africa" (1960), 17 African nations gained independence in a single year.

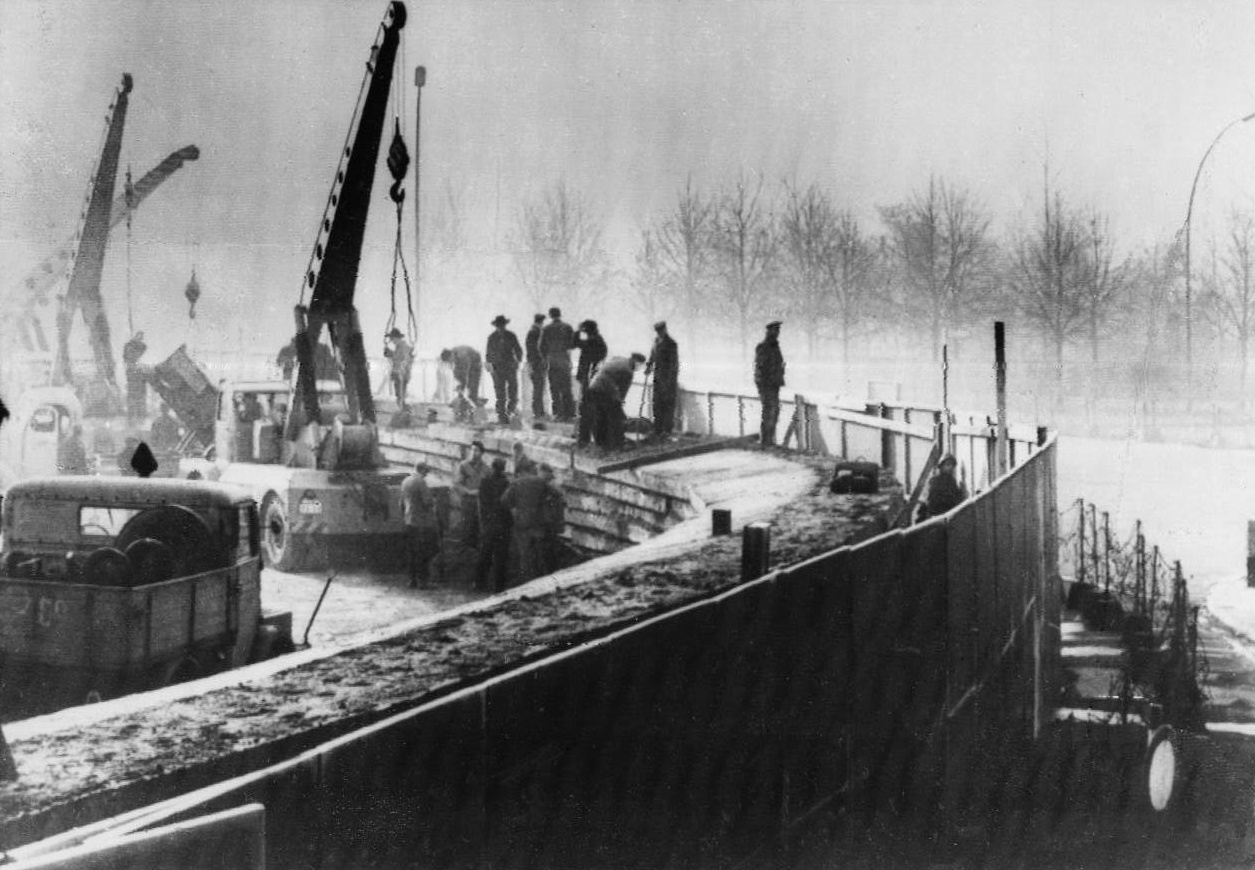
Construction of the Berlin Wall, 1961

After decades of economic growth and an increase in the standard of living of its working class, Western Europe experienced industrial decline, oil-fueled inflation and recession in the 1970s. Germany and Sweden sought to create a social consensus behind a gradual restructuring while Britain implemented aggressive austerity and privatization.

Western Europe's remaining military dictatorships all collapsed in quick succession in the 1970s. In Portugal's 1974 Carnation Revolution, military officers overthrew the decades-old Estado Novo regime, beginning a transition to democracy. Later that year, Greece's military junta collapsed over its role in the Cyprus crisis, restoring civilian rule in the period known as the Metapolitefsi. The death of Spain's caudillo in 1975 set off a top-down transition in Spain led by reformist politicians and King Juan Carlos I that replaced the old regime with a constitutional monarchy.

=== Post–Cold War era ===
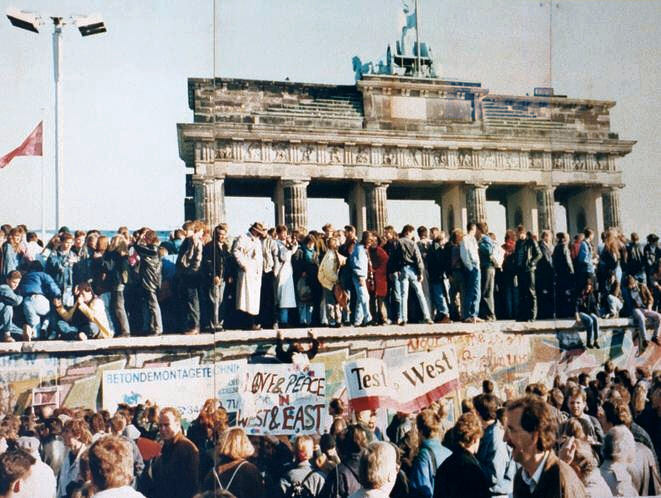
Fall of the Berlin Wall, November 1989

Breakup of Yugoslavia

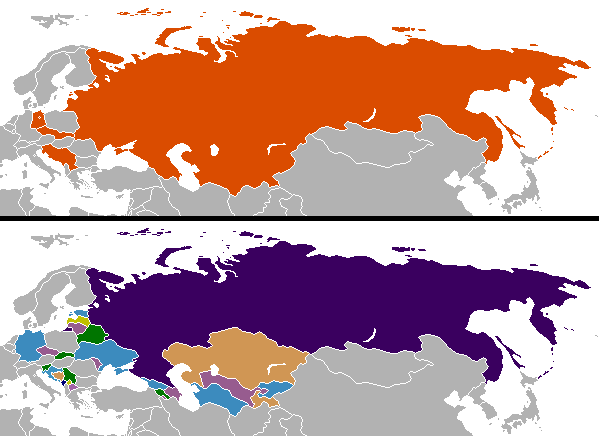
Changes in national boundaries after the end of the Cold War and the dissolution of the Soviet Union in 1991

Soviet leader Mikhail Gorbachev (1931–2022) repudiated the Brezhnev Doctrine in the late 1980s and refused to intervene militarily against Solidarność-led democratic reforms in Poland (1989), which led rapidly to fall of the Berlin Wall, the collapse of Communist governments outside the Soviet Union and the end of the Iron Curtain that had divided Europe since the end of World War II. In 1990 the Federal Republic of Germany absorbed East Germany. In 1991, the Soviet Union itself split into fifteen independent states. The most violent dissolution occurred in Yugoslavia.

English computer scientist Tim Berners-Lee’s (1955–) invention of the World Wide Web (Note: Hypertext Transfer Protocol ("HTTP") is the foundation of data communication for the World Wide Web, where hypertext documents include hyperlinks to other resources that the user can easily access, for example by a mouse click or by tapping the screen in a web browser.) while working at the European Organization for Nuclear Research in Switzerland in 1989 (Note: CERN made the Web protocol and code available royalty-free on 30 April 1993, enabling its widespread use.) began the transformation of the Internet from a specialized research network for scholars into a global interconnected information system used by billions of people every day, and the primary engine of the Digital Revolution.

In 1993, the Maastricht Treaty established the European Union, succeeding the EEC. The neutral countries of Austria, Finland and Sweden joined the EU in 1995, and those that did not join were tied into the EU's economic market via the European Economic Area and Schengen Agreement, which lifted border controls between member states. The euro was created in 1999 and replaced all previous currencies in participating states in 2002, forming the eurozone. In 2004, the EU gained 10 new members (Note: Estonia, Latvia, and Lithuania, which had been part of the Soviet Union; the Czech Republic, Hungary, Poland, Slovakia, and Slovenia, former-communist countries; and Malta, and the divided island of Cyprus) and two more in 2007. (Note: Bulgaria and Romania) Public opinion in the EU turned against further enlargement. (Note: Public opinion in EU countries generally opposed Turkish membership.) A European Constitution was rejected by voters in 2005.

Russia invaded Georgia in 2008.

Touched off by the Great Recession and the 2008 financial crisis, which caused government borrowing costs to soar, the decade-long euro area crisis (2009–2018) was intensified by the structural inability of the most impacted countries to devalue their shared currency and further aggravated by a continent-wide pivot toward austerity (Note: Imposed on debtor nations like Greece as a condition for bailouts but also adopted voluntarily by creditor nations (including Germany and the United Kingdom).) resulting in widespread social unrest and the anti-austerity movement. In a referendum in the United Kingdom on the country's membership in the EU in 2016, 52% of voters voted to leave the EU, leading to the complex Brexit separation process and negotiations, which led to political and economic changes for both the UK and the remaining EU countries. Although multiple European countries currently outside of the EU remain interested in joining, (Note: Albania, Moldova, Montenegro, North Macedonia, Serbia, and Ukraine are in accession negotiations to join the European Union, while Bosnia and Herzegovina and Georgia are candidate countries and Kosovo is a potential candidate country. In Turkey, although it has candidate country status, accession negotiations have been frozen.) the aspiration of a geographically and economically diminished EU to act as a third global superpower appeared increasingly unrealistic.

Beginning the largest and deadliest war in Europe since World War II, Russia invaded Ukraine on 24 February 2022, vastly escalating an ongoing conflict that had started with the 2014 Russian annexation of Crimea and separatist fighting in Donbas. In response, Finland and Sweden became members of NATO in 2023 and in 2024, respectively.

== Chronology ==
- 7000 BC: Neolithic in Europe begins.
- 4600 – 4200 BC: First European proto-civilisation, first golden artefacts and first fortified stone town – the Varna culture.
- 5000 – 3500 BC: First European proto-script – the Old European script (Danubian script).
- 3850 – 3600 BC: Malta's Temple period begins.
- 3500 BC: First European civilization, Minoan civilization, begins on Crete.
- 3000 BC: Indo-Europeans begin a large-scale settlement of the continent.
- 2500 BC: Stonehenge is constructed.
- 2100 BC: First European script, Cretan hieroglyphs, is invented by Minoans.
- 1750 BC: Mycenaean civilization begins.
- 1600 BC: Thera eruption occurs on the island of Santorini, destructing the Minoan city of Thera.
- 1450 BC: Crete is conquered by Mycenaeans.
- 1200 BC: Late Bronze Age collapse begins, that may be seen in the context of a technological history that saw the slow spread of ironworking technology from present-day Bulgaria and Romania in the 13th and the 12th centuries BC.
- 1100 BC: Minoan civilization falls.
- 1050 BC: Mycenaean civilization falls after a period of palace destruction, marking the beginning of Greek Dark Ages.
- 900 BC: Etruscan civilization begins.
- 800 BC: Greek Dark Ages end, marking the beginning of classical antiquity.
- 753 BC: Traditional year of founding of Rome.
- 700 BC: Homer composes The Iliad, an epic poem that represents the first extended work of European literature.
- 509 BC: Roman Republic is created.
- 499 BC: Greco-Persian Wars begin.
- c. 480 BC: The Thracian Odrysian kingdom was founded as the most important Daco-Thracian state union.
- 449 BC: End of Greco-Persian Wars with Greeks defeating Achaemenid Empire.
- 440 BC: Herodotus defends Athenian political freedom in the Histories.
- 404 BC: Sparta wins the Peloponnesian War.
- 323 BC: Alexander the Great dies and his Macedonian Empire (reaching far into Asia) fragments.
- 264 BC: Punic Wars begin.
- 212 BC: Archimedes killed after Roman siege of Syracuse.
- 146 BC: Punic Wars end with destruction of Carthage.
- 48 BC: Julius Caesar crosses the Rubicon river, marking the beginning of a civil war.
- 44 BC: Julius Caesar is murdered. The Roman Republic enters its terminal crisis.
- 27 BC: Establishment of the Roman Empire under Octavian.

AD

- 14 AD: Octavian dies.
- 30 or 33 AD: Jesus, a popular religious leader, is crucified.
- 45–55 (ca): First Christian congregations in mainland Greece and in Rome.
- 68: First Roman imperial dynasty, Julio-Claudian, ends with suicide of Nero.
- 79: Eruption of Vesuvius occurs, burying the cities of Pompeii, Herculaneum and Stabiae under the ashes.
- 117: Roman Empire reaches its territorial peak.
- 166: Antonine Plague begins.
- 293: Diocletian reorganizes the Empire by creating the Tetrarchy.
- 313: Constantine officially recognises Christianity, marking the end of the persecution of Christians.
- 325: Constantine convenes the First Council of Nicaea.
- 330: Constantine makes Constantinople into his capital, a new Rome.
- 370: Huns first enter Europe.
- 395: Following the death of Theodosius I, the Empire is permanently split into the Eastern Roman Empire (later Byzantium) and the Western Roman Empire.
- 476: Odoacer captures Ravenna and deposes the last Roman emperor in the west: traditionally seen as the end date of the Western Roman Empire.
- 527: Justinian I is crowned emperor of Byzantium. Orders the editing of Corpus Juris Civilis, Digest (Roman law).
- 597: Beginning of Roman Catholic Christianization of Anglo-Saxon England (missions and churches had been in existence well before this date, but their contacts with Rome had been loose or nonexistent)
- 600: Saint Columbanus uses the term "Europe" in a letter.
- 655: Jus patronatus.
- 681: Khan Asparukh leads the Bulgars and in a union with the numerous local Slavs invades the Byzantine Empire in the Battle of Ongal, creating Bulgaria.
- 711: Beginning of the Muslim conquest of the Iberian Peninsula.
- 718: Tervel of Bulgaria helps the Byzantine Empire stop the Arabic invasion of Europe, and breaks the siege of Constantinople.
- 722: Battle of Covadonga in the Iberian Peninsula. Pelayo, a noble Visigoth, defeats a Muslim army that tried to conquer the Cantabrian coast. This helps establish the Christian Kingdom of Asturias, and marks the beginning of the Reconquista.
- 732: At the Battle of Tours, the Franks stop the advance of the Arabs into Europe.
- 752: Pope Stephen II is the first bishop of Rome to ever cross the Alps.
- 800: Coronation of Charlemagne as Holy Roman Emperor.
- 813: Third Council of Tours: Priests are ordered to preach in the native language of the population.
- 828: Legendary theft of the relics of St Mark by Venetians.
- 843: Treaty of Verdun.
- 863: Saints Cyril and Methodius arrive in Great Moravia, initiating Christian mission among the Slav peoples.
- 864: Boris I of Bulgaria officially baptises the whole nation, converting the non-Christian population from Tengrism, Slavic and other paganism to Christianity, and officially founding the Bulgarian Church
- 872: Unification of Norway.
- 885–886: Vikings siege Paris.
- 886: Bulgarian students of Cyril and Methodius – Saint Sava, Kliment, Naum, Gorazd and Angelar– arrive back to Bulgaria, creating the Preslav and Ohrid Literary Schools.
- 893: The Cyrillic alphabet, developed during the 9th century AD at the Preslav Literary School in the First Bulgarian Empire, becomes the official Bulgarian alphabet.
- 895: Hungarian people led by Árpád start to settle in the Carpathian Basin.
- 917: In the Battle of Achelous (917) Bulgaria defeats the Byzantine Empire, and Simeon I of Bulgaria is proclaimed as emperor, thus Bulgaria becomes an empire.
- 935: Fatimid sack of Genoa.
- 962: Otto I of East Francia is crowned as "Emperor" by the Pope, beginning the Holy Roman Empire.
- 988 Kievan Rus adopts Christianity, often seen as the origin of the Orthodox Church of Ukraine, the Ukrainian Greek Catholic Church, and the Russian Orthodox Church.
- 1049: Reformist Pope Leo IX begins reign.
- 1054: Start of the East–West Schism, which divides the Christian church for centuries.
- 1059: The papal bull In nomine Domini strips the Holy Roman Emperor of his traditional role in appointing popes.
- 1066: Successful Norman invasion of England by William the Conqueror.
- 1071: Decisive defeat of the Byzantine army by the Seljuk Empire at the Battle of Manzikert.
- 1076: Investiture Controversy begins.
- 1095: Pope Urban II calls for the First Crusade.
- 12th century: The 12th century in literature saw an increase in the number of texts. The Renaissance of the 12th century occurs.
- 1128: Battle of São Mamede, formation of Portuguese sovereignty.
- 1131: Birth of the Kingdom of Sicily
- 1176: Lombard League defeats Holy Roman Empire at the Battle of Legnano
- 1183: Northern Italian city states win autonomy from Holy Roman Empire in the Peace of Constance
- 1180s: The oldest university currently in continuous operation in the world is founded in Bologna.
- 1185: Bulgarian sovereignty was reestablished with the anti-Byzantine uprising of the Bulgarians and Vlachs
- 1202: Fibonacci (Leonardo Bonacci of Pisa) produces Liber Abaci, introducing both base-10 positional notation and the symbols known as Arabic numerals in Europe.
- 1241: Mongol armies invade Central Europe and defeat a Polish-Moravian force at the Battle of Legnica and crush the Hungarians at the Battle of Mohi before withdrawing.
- 1250: Death of emperor Frederick II; end of effective ability of emperors to exercise control in Italy.
- 1256: Bologna's Liber Paradisus purchases the freedom of nearly 6,000 serfs, the first abolition of serfdom in Europe.
- 1295: Florence's Ordinances of Justice aligns the city with the Catholic Church against the Empire and ensures that the city's merchant and artisan guilds control its government.
- 1303: The period of the Crusades is over.
- 1309–1378: The Avignon Papacy
- 1315–1317: The Great Famine of 1315–1317 in Northern Europe
- 1341: Petrarch, the "Father of Humanism", becomes the first poet laureate since antiquity.
- 1337–1453: The Hundred Years' War between England and France.
- 1348–1351: Black Death kills about one-third of Europe's population.
- 1439: Johannes Gutenberg invents first movable type and the first printing press for books, starting the Printing Revolution.
- 1453: Fall of Constantinople to the Ottoman Turks.
- 1487: The Wars of the Roses end.
- 1492: The Reconquista ends in the Iberian Peninsula. A Spanish expeditionary group, commanded by Christopher Columbus, lands in the New World.
- 1494: Treaty of Tordesillas grants Africa and the East to Portugal and the Atlantic and everything beyond it to Spain.
- 1497: Vasco da Gama departs to India starting direct trade with Asia.
- 1498: Leonardo da Vinci paints The Last Supper in Milan as the Renaissance flourishes.
- 1503: Amerigo Vespucci's Mundus Novus letter is published.
- 1508: Maximilian I the last ruling "King of the Romans" and the first "elected Emperor of the Romans".
- 1517: Martin Luther nails his 95 theses on indulgences to the door of the church in Wittenberg, triggering discussions which would soon lead to the Reformation.
- 1519: Ferdinand Magellan and Juan Sebastián Elcano begin first global circumnavigation. Their expedition returns in 1522.
- 1519: Hernán Cortés begins conquest of Mexico for Spain.
- 1527: Sack of Rome by the mutinous troops of the Holy Roman Emperor Charles V.
- 1529: Failure of the Ottoman Empire's first attempt to capture the Habsburg capital of Vienna.
- 1532: Francisco Pizarro begins the conquest of Peru (the Inca Empire) for Spain.
- 1532: Niccolò Machiavelli's The Prince is published.
- 1543: Nicolaus Copernicus publishes De revolutionibus orbium coelestium (On the Revolutions of the Celestial Spheres).
- 1547: The Grand Duchy of Moscow becomes the Tsardom of Russia.
- 1568–1570: The first of twelve Russo-Turkish wars.
- 1572: Tycho Brahe witnesses a supernova.
- 1582: The introduction of the Gregorian calendar; Russia refuses to adopt it until 1918.
- 1609: Johannes Kepler's Astronomia nova includes the first mention of elliptical planetary orbits.
- 1610: Galileo Galilei uses his telescope to discover the moons of Jupiter and publishes the Starry Messenger.
- 1618: The Thirty Years' War brings massive devastation to central Europe.
- 1648: The Peace of Westphalia ends the Thirty Years' War, and introduces the principle of the integrity of the nation state.
- 1683: Failure of the Ottoman Empire's second and last attempt to capture the Habsburg capital of Vienna.
- 1687: Isaac Newton publishes Principia Mathematica, having a profound impact on The Enlightenment.
- 1688: Glorious Revolution in England.
- 1699: Treaty of Karlowitz concludes the Austro-Ottoman War. This marks the end of Ottoman control of Central Europe and the beginning of Ottoman stagnation, establishing the Habsburg monarchy as the dominant power in Central and Southeastern Europe.
- 1700: Outbreak of the War of the Spanish Succession and the Great Northern War. The first would check the aspirations of Louis XIV, king of France to dominate European affairs; the second would lead to Russia's emergence as a great power and a recognizably European state.
- 18th century: Age of Enlightenment spurs an intellectual renaissance across Europe.
- 1707: The Kingdom of Great Britain is formed by the union of the Kingdom of England and the Kingdom of Scotland.
- 1712: Thomas Newcomen invents first practical steam engine which begins Industrial Revolution in Britain.
- 1721: Treaty of Nystad and foundation of the Russian Empire.
- 1772–1795: Three partitions of the Polish–Lithuanian Commonwealth
- 1775: James Watt invents a new efficient steam engine accelerating the Industrial Revolution in Britain.
- 1776: Adam Smith publishes The Wealth of Nations.
- 1784: Immanuel Kant publishes Answering the Question: What Is Enlightenment?.
- 1789: Beginning of the French Revolution.
- 1793–1794: Reign of Terror
- 1799: Napoleon's coup d'état
- 1806: Dissolution of the Holy Roman Empire
- 1812: Fire of Moscow
- 1815: Battle of Waterloo and permanent exile of Napoleon
- 1814–1815: Congress of Vienna; Treaty of Vienna; France is reduced to 1789 boundaries; Reactionary forces dominate across Europe.
- 1825: George Stephenson opens the Stockton and Darlington Railway the first steam train railway for passenger traffic in the world.
- 1830: The southern provinces secede from the United Kingdom of the Netherlands in the Belgian Revolution.
- 1836: Louis Daguerre invents first practical photographic method, in effect the first camera.
- 1838: SS Great Western, the first steamship built for regularly scheduled transatlantic crossings enters service.
- 1848: Revolutions of 1848 and publication of The Communist Manifesto
- 1853: Start of the Crimean War, which ends in 1856 in a defeat for Russia.
- 1859: Charles Darwin publishes On the Origin of Species.
- 1861: Unification of Italy after victories by Giuseppe Garibaldi.
- 1866: First commercially successful transatlantic telegraph cable is completed.
- 1860s: Russia emancipates its serfs and Karl Marx completes the first volume of Das Kapital.
- 1870: Franco-Prussian War and the fall of the Second French Empire.
- 1871: Unification of Germany under the direction of Otto von Bismarck.
- 1873: Panic of 1873 occurs. The Long Depression begins.
- 1877–1878: Russo-Turkish War (1877–1878) and re-establishment of Bulgaria, independence of Serbia, Montenegro and Romania
- 1882: Triple Alliance formed between Germany, Austria-Hungary and Italy.
- 1884: First permanent citywide electrical tram system in Europe (in Brighton).
- 1885: Karl Benz invents Benz Patent-Motorwagen, the world's first automobile.
- 1895: Auguste and Louis Lumière begin exhibitions of projected films before the paying public with their cinematograph, a portable camera, printer, and projector.
- 1902: Guglielmo Marconi sends first transatlantic radio transmission.
- 1905: Albert Einstein's annus mirabilis.
- 1907: Triple Entente formed between French Republic, Russian Empire and United Kingdom.
- 1914: Archduke Franz Ferdinand of Austria is assassinated in Sarajevo; World War I begins a month later.
- 1917: Vladimir Lenin and the Bolsheviks seize power in the Russian Revolution. The ensuing Russian Civil War lasts until 1922.
- 1918: World War I ends with the defeat of Germany and the Central Powers. Ten million soldiers killed; collapse of Russian, German, Austrian, and Ottoman empires.
- 1918: Collapse of the German Empire and monarchic system; founding of Weimar Republic.
- 1918: Worldwide Spanish flu epidemic kills millions in Europe.
- 1918: Austro-Hungarian Empire dissolves.
- 1919: Versailles Treaty strips Germany of its colonies, several provinces and its navy and air force; limits army; Allies occupy western areas; reparations ordered.
- 1920: League of Nations begins operations; largely ineffective; defunct by 1939.
- 1921–22: Ireland divided; Irish Free State becomes independent and civil war erupts.
- 1922: Benito Mussolini and the Fascists take power in Italy.
- 1929: Worldwide Great Depression begins with stock market crash in New York City.
- 1933: Adolf Hitler and the Nazis take power in Germany.
- 1935: Italy conquers Ethiopia; League sanctions are ineffective.
- 1936: Start of the Spanish Civil War; ends in 1939 with victory of Nationalists who are aided by Germany and Italy.
- 1938: Germany escalates the persecution of Jews with Kristallnacht.
- 1938: Appeasement of Germany by Britain and France; Munich Agreement splits Czechoslovakia; Germany seized the remainder in 1939.
- 1939: Britain and France hurriedly rearm; failed to arrange treaty with USSR.
- 1939: Adolf Hitler and Joseph Stalin agree partition of Eastern Europe in Molotov–Ribbentrop Pact.
- 1939: Nazi Germany invades Poland, starting the Second World War.
- 1940: Great Britain under Winston Churchill becomes the last nation to hold out against the Nazis after winning the Battle of Britain.
- 1941: U.S. begins large-scale lend-lease aid to Britain, Free France, the USSR and other Allies; Canada also provides financial aid.
- 1941: Germany invades the Soviet Union in Operation Barbarossa; fails to capture Moscow or Leningrad.
- 1941: Adolf Hitler and Nazi Germany begin the systematic murder of Jews with mass shootings during the invasion of the Soviet Union.
- 1943: After Stalingrad and Kursk, Soviet forces begin recapturing Nazi-occupied territory in the East.
- 1944: U.S., British and Canadian armed forces invade Nazi-occupied France at Normandy.
- 1945: Hitler commits suicide, Mussolini is executed. World War II ends with Europe in ruins and Germany defeated.
- 1945: United Nations formed.
- 1947: The British Empire begins a process of voluntarily dismantling with the granting of independence to India and Pakistan.
- 1947: Cold War begins as Europe is polarized East versus West.
- 1948–1951: U.S. provides large sums to rebuild Western Europe through the Marshall Plan; stimulates large-scale modernization of European industries and reduction of trade restrictions.
- 1949: The NATO alliance and the Council of Europe are founded.
- 1950: The Schuman Declaration begins the process of European integration.
- 1954: The French Empire begins to be dismantled; Withdraws from Vietnam.
- 1955: USSR creates a rival military coalition to the NATO, the Warsaw Pact.
- 1956: Suez Crisis signals the end of the effective power of the British Empire.
- 1956: Hungarian Uprising defeated by Soviet military forces.
- 1957: Treaties of Rome establish the European Economic Community from 1958.
- 1962: The Second Vatican Council opens and begins a period of reform in the Catholic Church
- 1968: The May 1968 events in France lead France to the brink of revolution.
- 1968: The Prague Spring is defeated by Warsaw Pact military forces. The Club of Rome is founded.
- 1973: Denmark, Ireland and the United Kingdom join the European Communities.
- 1980: The Solidarność movement under Lech Wałęsa begins open, overground opposition to the Communist rule in Poland.
- 1981: Greece joins the European Communities.
- 1985: Mikhail Gorbachev becomes leader of the Soviet Union and begins reforms which inadvertently leads to the fall of Communism and the Soviet Union.
- 1986: Portugal and Spain join the European Communities.
- 1986: Chernobyl disaster occurs, the worst nuclear disaster in history.
- 1989: Soviet leader Mikhail Gorbachev refuses to use military force when a free Polish election is overwhelmingly won by non-Communist candidates. Communism overthrown in all the Warsaw Pact countries except the Soviet Union. Fall of the Berlin Wall (opening of unrestrained border crossings between east and west, which effectively deprived the wall of any relevance).
- 1990: Reunification of Germany.
- 1991: Breakup of Yugoslavia and the beginning of the Yugoslav Wars.
- 1991: Dissolution of the Soviet Union and the creation of the Commonwealth of Independent States.
- 1993: Maastricht Treaty establishes the European Union.
- 1995: Austria, Finland and Sweden join the European Union.
- 1997–99: End of European colonial empires in Asia with the handover of Hong Kong and Macau to China.
- 2004: Slovenia, Hungary, the Czech Republic, Slovakia, Poland, Lithuania, Latvia, Estonia, Cyprus and Malta join the European Union.
- 2007: Bulgaria and Romania join the European Union.
- 2008: The Great Recession begins. Unemployment rises in some parts of Europe.
- 2009–2018: Euro area crisis
- 2013: Croatia joins the European Union.
- 2014: Revolution of Dignity in Ukraine and the beginning of the Russo-Ukrainian War.
- 2015: European migrant crisis starts.
- 2020: The United Kingdom leaves the European Union.
- 2020–2023: COVID-19 pandemic in Europe, countries with the most cases are Russia, the United Kingdom, France, Spain, and Italy.
- 2022: Russian invasion of Ukraine opens with some of the most intense combat operations in Europe since the end of the Cold War.
- 2023: Finland joins NATO.
- 2024: Sweden joins NATO.

== See also ==
- Genetic history of Europe
- History of the Balkans
- History of the Mediterranean region
- History of the Romani people
- History of Western civilization
- List of history journals § Europe
- List of largest European cities in history
- List of predecessors of sovereign states in Europe
- List of sovereign states by date of formation § Europe
- Timeline of European Union history
