= January 27 =

January 27 this year in various calendars
- Tuesday, 27 January 2026
Other calendars
Akan	Kwabene
Armenian	11 Mehekani 1475
Aztec	Toxcatl 17, 5 Cōātl
Babylonian	7 Tebetu, 2336 SE
Balinese pawukon	Luang, Pepet, Beteng, Sri, Wage, Was, Anggara of Matal, Ludra, Ogan, Raja
Bengali	13 Magh, BS 1432
Chinese	Yin Metal Ox・Turtle Beak Mansion; 9 Làyuè, Yǐsìnián (Dahan, 8 days until Lichun)
Common Era	27 January 2026 CE
Coptic	19 Tobi, AM 1742
Egyptian	16 Payni, 2774 NE
Ethiopian	19 Ṭer, 2018 Amätä Məhrät
French Republican	Décade I, Octidi de Pluviôse de l'Année 234 de la République
Gregorian	27 January, AD 2026
Hebrew	9 Shevat, AM 5786
Hindu	Bharaṇī・Śubha; Solar: 14 Māgha, 1947 SE; Lunisolar: Navamī, Śukla pakṣa of Māgha, 2082 VE; Siddhārthin・5126 KY・1,872,602
Icelandic	Þriðjudagur, 5 Þorri 2025
Islamic	8 Sha'aban, AH 1447 (using tabular method)
ISO week date	2026-W05-2
Japanese	9 Shiwasu, Reiwa 8 (Daikan, 8 days until Risshun)
Julian	14 January, AD 2026 (AM 7534)
Julian day	2461068
Maya	13.0.13.5.5; 3 Pax, 5 Chicchan
Roman	ante diem XIX Kalendas Februarias, MMDCCLXXIX AUC
Solar Hijri	7 Bahman, SH 1404
Tibetan	9 rgyal, shing mo sbrul 2152 or 1771 or 999

<<	January					>>
Su	Mo	Tu	We	Th	Fr	Sa
				1	2	3
4	5	6	7	8	9	10
11	12	13	14	15	16	17
18	19	20	21	22	23	24
25	26	27	28	29	30	31
2026

January 27 in recent years
2026 (Tuesday)
2025 (Monday)
2024 (Saturday)
2023 (Friday)
2022 (Thursday)
2021 (Wednesday)
2020 (Monday)
2019 (Sunday)
2018 (Saturday)
2017 (Friday)

January 27 is the 27th day of the year in the Gregorian calendar; 338 days remain until the end of the year (339 in leap years).

== Events ==
=== Pre-1600 ===
- 98 – Trajan succeeds his adoptive father Nerva as Roman emperor.
- 417 – Pope Innocent I declares Pelagius and his follower Caelestius excommunicated unless they return to orthodoxy.
- 532 – Nika riots in Constantinople fail.
- 945 – The co-emperors Stephen and Constantine are overthrown and forced to become monks by Constantine VII, who becomes sole emperor of the Byzantine Empire.
- 1186 – Henry VI, the son and heir of the Holy Roman Emperor Frederick I, marries Constance of Sicily.
- 1302 – Dante Alighieri is condemned in absentia and exiled from Florence.
- 1343 – Pope Clement VI issues the papal bull Unigenitus, laying out the scriptural justification for indulgences, identifying only the Pope and episcopate as capable of accessing the treasury of merit, and establishing a jubilee year every half century.

=== 1601–1900 ===
- 1606 – Gunpowder Plot: The trial of Guy Fawkes and other conspirators begins, ending with their execution on January 31.
- 1695 – Mustafa II becomes the Ottoman sultan and Caliph of Islam in Istanbul on the death of Ahmed II. Mustafa rules until his abdication in 1703.
- 1726 – J. S. Bach leads the first performance of Alles nur nach Gottes Willen, BWV 72, concluding his third Christmas season in Leipzig on the Third Sunday after Epiphany.
- 1759 – Spanish forces clash with indigenous Huilliches of southern Chile in the battle of Río Bueno.
- 1776 – American Revolutionary War: Henry Knox's "noble train of artillery" arrives in Cambridge, Massachusetts.
- 1785 – The University of Georgia is founded, the first state-chartered public university in the United States.
- 1820 – A Russian expedition led by Fabian Gottlieb von Bellingshausen and Mikhail Petrovich Lazarev discovers the Antarctic continent, approaching the Antarctic coast.
- 1825 – The U.S. Congress approves Indian Territory (in what is present-day Oklahoma), clearing the way for forced relocation of the Eastern Indians on the "Trail of Tears".
- 1868 – Boshin War: The Battle of Toba–Fushimi begins, between forces of the Tokugawa shogunate and pro-Imperial factions; it will end in defeat for the shogunate, and is a pivotal point in the Meiji Restoration.
- 1869 – Boshin War: Tokugawa rebels establish the Ezo Republic in Hokkaidō.
- 1874 – Modest Mussorgsky's opera Boris Godunov premieres in Mariinsky Theatre in St.Petersburg.
- 1880 – Thomas Edison receives a patent for his incandescent lamp.

=== 1901–present ===
- 1916 – World War I: The British government passes the Military Service Act that introduces conscription in the United Kingdom.
- 1918 – Beginning of the Finnish Civil War.
- 1924 – Six days after his death, Vladimir Lenin's body is carried into a specially erected mausoleum.
- 1927 – Ibn Saud takes the title of King of Nejd.
- 1928 – Bundaberg tragedy: a diphtheria vaccine is contaminated with Staph. aureus bacterium, resulting in the deaths of twelve children in the Australian town of Bundaberg.
- 1939 – First flight of the Lockheed P-38 Lightning.
- 1943 – World War II: The Eighth Air Force sorties ninety-one B-17s and B-24s to attack the U-boat construction yards at Wilhelmshaven, Germany. This was the first American bombing attack on Germany.
- 1944 – World War II: The 872-day Siege of Leningrad is lifted.
- 1945 – World War II: The Soviet 322nd Rifle Division liberates the remaining inmates of Auschwitz-Birkenau.
- 1951 – Nuclear testing at the Nevada Test Site begins with Operation Ranger.
- 1961 – The Soviet submarine S-80 sinks when its snorkel malfunctions, flooding the boat.
- 1965 – South Vietnamese Prime Minister Trần Văn Hương is removed by the military junta of Nguyễn Khánh.
- 1967 – Apollo program: Astronauts Gus Grissom, Ed White and Roger Chaffee are killed in a fire during a test of their Apollo 1 spacecraft at the Kennedy Space Center, Florida.
- 1967 – Cold War: The Soviet Union, the United States, and the United Kingdom sign the Outer Space Treaty in Washington, D.C., banning deployment of nuclear weapons in space, and limiting the usage of the Moon and other celestial bodies to peaceful purposes.
- 1973 – The Paris Peace Accords officially ends the Vietnam War. Colonel William Nolde is killed in action becoming the conflict's last recorded American combat casualty.
- 1980 – Through cooperation between the U.S. and Canadian governments, six American diplomats secretly escape hostilities in Iran in the culmination of the Canadian Caper.
- 1983 – The pilot shaft of the Seikan Tunnel, the world's longest sub-aqueous tunnel (53.85 km) between the Japanese islands of Honshū and Hokkaidō, breaks through.
- 1996 – In a military coup, Colonel Ibrahim Baré Maïnassara deposes the first democratically elected president of Niger, Mahamane Ousmane.
- 1996 – Germany first observes the International Holocaust Remembrance Day.
- 2002 – An explosion at a military storage facility in Lagos, Nigeria, kills at least 1,100 people and displaces over 20,000 others.
- 2003 – The first selections for the National Recording Registry are announced by the Library of Congress.
- 2010 – The 2009 Honduran constitutional crisis ends when Porfirio Lobo Sosa becomes the new President of Honduras.
- 2010 – Apple announces the iPad.
- 2011 – Arab Spring: The Yemeni Revolution begins as over 16,000 protestors demonstrate in Sanaa.
- 2011 – Within Ursa Minor, H1504+65, a white dwarf with the hottest known surface temperature in the universe at 200,000 K, was documented.
- 2013 – Two hundred and forty-two people die in a nightclub fire in the Brazilian city of Santa Maria, Rio Grande do Sul.
- 2014 – Rojava conflict: The Kobanî Canton declares its autonomy from the Syrian Arab Republic.
- 2017 – A naming ceremony for the chemical element tennessine takes place in the United States.
- 2023 – Protests and public outrage spark across the U.S. after the release of multiple videos by the Memphis Police Department showing officers punching, kicking, and pepper spraying Tyre Nichols as a result of running away from a traffic stop, which resulted him dying in the hospital three days later after the incident.
- 2023 – A shooting at a synagogue in Neve Yaakov, East Jerusalem, kills seven people and injures three others.
- 2023 – An attack on the Azerbaijani embassy in Pasdaran, Tehran, kills one person and injures three others.

== Births ==
=== Pre-1600 ===
- 1365 – Edward of Angoulême, English noble (died 1370)
- 1443 – Albert III, Duke of Saxony (died 1500)
- 1546 – Joachim III Frederick, Elector of Brandenburg (died 1608)
- 1571 – Abbas I of Persia (died 1629)
- 1585 – Hendrick Avercamp, Dutch painter (died 1634)

=== 1601–1900 ===
- 1603 – Sir Harbottle Grimston, 2nd Baronet, English lawyer and politician, Speaker of the House of Commons (died 1685)
- 1603 – Humphrey Mackworth, English politician, lawyer and judge (died 1654)
- 1621 – Thomas Willis, English physician and anatomist (died 1675)
- 1662 – Richard Bentley, English scholar and theologian (died 1742)
- 1663 – George Byng, 1st Viscount Torrington, Royal Navy admiral (died 1733)
- 1687 – Johann Balthasar Neumann, German engineer and architect, designed Würzburg Residence and Basilica of the Fourteen Holy Helpers (died 1753)
- 1701 – Johann Nikolaus von Hontheim, German historian and theologian (died 1790)
- 1708 – Grand Duchess Anna Petrovna of Russia (died 1728)
- 1741 – Hester Thrale, Welsh author (died 1821)
- 1756 – Wolfgang Amadeus Mozart, Austrian pianist and composer (died 1791)
- 1775 – Friedrich Wilhelm Joseph Schelling, German-Swiss philosopher and academic (died 1854)
- 1782 – Titumir, Bengali revolutionary (died 1831)
- 1790 – Juan Álvarez, Mexican general and president (1855) (died 1867)
- 1795 – Eli Whitney Blake, American engineer, invented the Mortise lock (died 1886)
- 1803 – Eunice Hale Waite Cobb, American writer, public speaker, and activist (died 1880)
- 1805 – Maria Anna of Bavaria (died 1877)
- 1805 – Samuel Palmer, English painter and etcher (died 1881)
- 1806 – Juan Crisóstomo Arriaga, Spanish composer and educator (died 1826)
- 1808 – David Strauss, German theologian and author (died 1874)
- 1814 – Eugène Viollet-le-Duc, French architect, designed the Lausanne Cathedral (died 1879)
- 1821 – John Chivington, American colonel and pastor (died 1892)
- 1823 – Édouard Lalo, French violinist and composer (died 1892)
- 1824 – Urbain Johnson, Canadian farmer and political figure (died 1917)
- 1826 – Mikhail Saltykov-Shchedrin, Russian journalist and author (died 1889)
- 1826 – Richard Taylor, American general, historian, and politician (died 1879)
- 1832 – Lewis Carroll, English novelist, poet, and mathematician (died 1898)
- 1832 – Carl Friedrich Schmidt, Estonian-Russian geologist and botanist (died 1908)
- 1836 – Leopold von Sacher-Masoch, Austrian journalist and author (died 1895)
- 1842 – Arkhip Kuindzhi, Ukrainian-Russian painter (died 1910)
- 1848 – Tōgō Heihachirō, Japanese admiral (died 1934)
- 1850 – John Collier, English painter and author (died 1934)
- 1850 – Samuel Gompers, English-American labor leader (died 1924)
- 1850 – Edward Smith, English captain (died 1912)
- 1858 – Neel Doff, Dutch-Belgian author (died 1942)
- 1859 – Wilhelm II, German Emperor during World War I (died 1941)
- 1869 – Will Marion Cook, American violinist and composer (died 1944)
- 1878 – Dorothy Scarborough, American author (died 1935)
- 1885 – Jerome Kern, American composer and songwriter (died 1945)
- 1885 – Seison Maeda, Japanese painter (died 1977)
- 1886 – Radhabinod Pal, Indian academic and jurist (died 1967)
- 1889 – Balthasar van der Pol, Dutch physicist and academic (died 1959)
- 1893 – Soong Ching-ling, Chinese politician, Honorary President of the People's Republic of China (died 1981)
- 1895 – Joseph Rosenstock, Polish-American conductor and manager (died 1985)
- 1895 – Harry Ruby, American composer and screenwriter (died 1974)
- 1900 – Hyman G. Rickover, American admiral, leader in the development of nuclear propulsion in the US Navy (died 1986)

=== 1901–present ===
- 1901 – Willy Fritsch, German actor (died 1973)
- 1901 – Art Rooney, American football player, coach and owner (died 1988)
- 1903 – John Eccles, Australian-Swiss neurophysiologist and academic, Nobel Prize laureate (died 1997)
- 1904 – James J. Gibson, American psychologist and academic (died 1979)
- 1905 – Howard McNear, American actor (died 1969)
- 1908 – William Randolph Hearst, Jr., American journalist and publisher (died 1993)
- 1910 – Edvard Kardelj, Slovene general, economist, and politician, 2nd Foreign Minister of Yugoslavia (died 1979)
- 1912 – Arne Næss, Norwegian philosopher and environmentalist (died 2009)
- 1912 – Francis Rogallo, American engineer, invented the Rogallo wing (died 2009)
- 1913 – Michael Ripper, English actor (died 2000)
- 1915 – Jules Archer, American historian and author (died 2008)
- 1915 – Jacques Hnizdovsky, Ukrainian-American painter, sculptor, and illustrator (died 1985)
- 1918 – Skitch Henderson, American pianist, composer, and conductor (died 2005)
- 1918 – Elmore James, American singer-songwriter and guitarist (died 1963)
- 1918 – William Seawell, American general (died 2005)
- 1919 – Ross Bagdasarian, Sr., American singer-songwriter, pianist, producer, and actor, created Alvin and the Chipmunks (died 1972)
- 1920 – Hiroyoshi Nishizawa, Japanese lieutenant and pilot (died 1944)
- 1920 – Helmut Zacharias, German violinist and composer (died 2002)
- 1921 – Donna Reed, American actress (died 1986)
- 1924 – Rauf Denktaş, Cypriot lawyer and politician, 1st President of Northern Cyprus (died 2012)
- 1924 – Brian Rix, English actor, producer, and politician (died 2016)
- 1924 – Harvey Shapiro, American poet (died 2013)
- 1926 – Fritz Spiegl, Austrian flute player and journalist (died 2003)
- 1926 – Ingrid Thulin, Swedish actress (died 2004)
- 1928 – Hans Modrow, Polish-German lawyer and politician, 5th Prime Minister of East Germany (died 2023)
- 1929 – Mohamed Al-Fayed, Egyptian-Swiss businessman (died 2023)
- 1929 – Michael Craig, Indian-English actor and screenwriter
- 1929 – Gastón Suárez, Bolivian author and playwright (died 1984)
- 1930 – Bobby Bland, American blues singer-songwriter (died 2013)
- 1931 – Mordecai Richler, Canadian author and screenwriter (died 2001)
- 1931 – Nigel Vinson, Baron Vinson, English lieutenant and businessman
- 1932 – Boris Shakhlin, Russian-Ukrainian gymnast (died 2008)
- 1933 – Jerry Buss, American chemist and businessman (died 2013)
- 1934 – Édith Cresson, French politician and diplomat, Prime Minister of France
- 1934 – George Follmer, American race car driver
- 1935 – Steve Demeter, American baseball player, coach, and manager (died 2013)
- 1936 – Troy Donahue, American actor (died 2001)
- 1936 – Samuel C. C. Ting, American physicist and academic, Nobel Prize laureate
- 1937 – Fred Åkerström, Swedish singer-songwriter and guitarist (died 1985)
- 1940 – Ahmet Kurtcebe Alptemoçin, Turkish engineer and politician, 35th Turkish Minister of Foreign Affairs
- 1940 – James Cromwell, American actor
- 1940 – Terry Harper, Canadian ice hockey player and coach
- 1940 – Petru Lucinschi, Romanian activist and politician, 2nd President of Moldova
- 1940 – Reynaldo Rey, American actor and screenwriter (died 2015)
- 1941 – Beatrice Tinsley, New Zealand astronomer and cosmologist (died 1981)
- 1942 – Maki Asakawa, Japanese singer-songwriter and producer (died 2010)
- 1942 – Tasuku Honjo, Japanese immunologist, Nobel Prize laureate in Physiology or Medicine
- 1942 – John Witherspoon, American actor and comedian (died 2019)
- 1942 – Kate Wolf, American singer-songwriter and guitarist (died 1986)
- 1943 – Julia Cumberlege, Baroness Cumberlege, English businesswoman and politician
- 1944 – Peter Akinola, Nigerian archbishop
- 1944 – Mairead Maguire, Northern Irish activist, Nobel Prize laureate
- 1944 – Nick Mason, English drummer, songwriter, and producer
- 1945 – Harold Cardinal, Canadian lawyer and politician (died 2005)
- 1946 – Christopher Hum, English academic and diplomat, British Ambassador to China
- 1946 – Nedra Talley, American singer
- 1947 – Björn Afzelius, Swedish singer-songwriter and guitarist (died 1999)
- 1947 – Vyron Polydoras, Greek lawyer and politician, Greek Minister for Public Order
- 1947 – Cal Schenkel, American painter and illustrator
- 1947 – Philip Sugden, English historian and author (died 2014)
- 1947 – Perfecto Yasay Jr., Filipino lawyer and Secretary of Foreign Affairs of the Philippines (died 2020)
- 1948 – Mikhail Baryshnikov, Russian-American dancer, choreographer, and actor
- 1948 – Jean-Philippe Collard, French pianist
- 1950 – Jiří Bubla, Czech ice hockey player
- 1951 – Seth Justman, American keyboard player and songwriter
- 1951 – Cees van der Knaap, Dutch soldier and politician
- 1952 – Brian Gottfried, American tennis player
- 1952 – Billy Johnson, American football player and coach
- 1952 – Tam O'Shaughnessy, American tennis player, psychologist, and academic
- 1952 – G. E. Smith, American guitarist and songwriter
- 1954 – Peter Laird, American author and illustrator
- 1954 – Ed Schultz, American talk show host and sportscaster (died 2018)
- 1955 – Brian Engblom, Canadian ice hockey player and sportscaster
- 1955 – John Roberts, American lawyer and judge, 17th Chief Justice of the United States
- 1956 – Mimi Rogers, American actress
- 1957 – Janick Gers, English guitarist and songwriter
- 1957 – Frank Miller, American illustrator, director, producer, and screenwriter
- 1958 – James Grippando, American lawyer and author
- 1958 – Alan Milburn, English businessman and politician, Chancellor of the Duchy of Lancaster
- 1958 – Susanna Thompson, American actress
- 1959 – Cris Collinsworth, American football player and sportscaster
- 1959 – Göran Hägglund, Swedish lawyer and politician, 28th Swedish Minister for Social Affairs
- 1959 – Keith Olbermann, American journalist and author
- 1960 – Fiona O'Donnell, Canadian-Scottish politician
- 1961 – Gillian Gilbert, English musician, songwriter, and singer
- 1961 – Narciso Rodriguez, American fashion designer
- 1961 – Margo Timmins, Canadian singer-songwriter
- 1962 – Roberto Paci Dalò, Italian director and composer
- 1963 – George Monbiot, English-Welsh author and activist
- 1964 – Bridget Fonda, American actress
- 1964 – Jack Haley, American basketball player (died 2015)
- 1964 – Patrick van Deurzen, Dutch composer and academic
- 1965 – Alan Cumming, Scottish-American actor
- 1965 – Mike Newell, English footballer and manager
- 1965 – Ignacio Noé, Argentinian author and illustrator
- 1965 – Attila Sekerlioglu, Austrian footballer and manager
- 1966 – Tamlyn Tomita, Japanese-American actress and singer
- 1967 – Dave Manson, Canadian ice hockey player and coach
- 1968 – Tracy Lawrence, American country singer
- 1968 – Mike Patton, American singer, composer, and voice artist
- 1968 – Matt Stover, American football player
- 1968 – Tricky, English rapper and producer
- 1969 – Michael Kulas, Canadian singer-songwriter and producer
- 1969 – Patton Oswalt, American comedian and actor
- 1969 – Shane Thomson, New Zealand cricketer
- 1970 – Bradley Clyde, Australian rugby league player
- 1970 – Dean Headley, English cricketer and coach
- 1971 – Patrice Brisebois, Canadian ice hockey player and coach
- 1972 – Bibi Gaytán, Mexican singer and actress
- 1972 – Josh Randall, American actor
- 1972 – Bryant Young, American football player and coach
- 1973 – Valyantsin Byalkevich, Belarusian footballer and manager (died 2014)
- 1974 – Ole Einar Bjørndalen, Norwegian skier and biathlete
- 1974 – Andrei Pavel, Romanian tennis player and coach
- 1974 – Chaminda Vaas, Sri Lankan cricketer and coach
- 1976 – Clint Ford, American screenwriter and voice actor
- 1976 – Danielle George, American professor
- 1976 – Ahn Jung-hwan, South Korean footballer
- 1976 – Fred Taylor, American football player
- 1977 – Tomi Kallio, Finnish ice hockey player
- 1979 – Lonny Baxter, American basketball player
- 1979 – Daniel Vettori, New Zealand cricketer and coach
- 1980 – Chanda Gunn, American ice hockey player and coach
- 1980 – Marat Safin, Russian tennis player and politician
- 1980 – Jiří Welsch, Czech basketball player
- 1981 – Alicia Molik, Australian tennis player and sportscaster
- 1981 – Tony Woodcock, New Zealand rugby player
- 1982 – Eva Asderaki, Greek tennis umpire
- 1983 – Carlo Colaiacovo, Canadian ice hockey player
- 1983 – Paulo Colaiacovo, Canadian ice hockey player
- 1983 – Gavin Floyd, American baseball player
- 1983 – Lee Grant, English footballer
- 1985 – Ruben Amorim, Portuguese footballer and manager
- 1986 – Johan Petro, French basketball player
- 1987 – Katy Rose, American singer-songwriter and producer
- 1987 – Anton Shunin, Russian footballer
- 1988 – Kerlon, Brazilian footballer
- 1989 – Alberto Botía, Spanish footballer
- 1990 – Tim Beckham, American baseball player
- 1991 – Christian Bickel, German footballer
- 1991 – Julio Teherán, Colombian baseball player
- 1992 – Stefano Pettinari, Italian footballer
- 1994 – Desiree Becker, German politician
- 1994 – Jack Stephens, English footballer
- 1995 – Harrison Reed, English footballer
- 1996 – Braeden Lemasters, American actor, musician, and singer
- 1998 – Devin Druid, American actor
- 2000 – Morgan Gibbs-White, English footballer
- 2000 – Aurélien Tchouaméni, French footballer
- 2003 – Park Seong-hoon, South Korean footballer

== Deaths ==
=== Pre-1600 ===
- 98 – Nerva, Roman emperor (born 35)
- 457 – Marcian, Byzantine emperor (born 392)
- 555 – Yuan Di, emperor of the Liang Dynasty (born 508)
- 672 – Pope Vitalian
- 847 – Pope Sergius II (born 790)
- 906 – Liu Can, chancellor of the Tang Dynasty
- 931 – Ruotger, archbishop of Trier
- 947 – Zhang Yanze, Chinese general and governor
- 1062 – Adelaide of Hungary, (born c. 1040)
- 1311 – Külüg Khan, Emperor Wuzong of Yuan
- 1377 – Frederick the Simple, King of Sicily
- 1490 – Ashikaga Yoshimasa, Japanese shōgun (born 1435)
- 1504 – Ludovico II, Marquess of Saluzzo (born 1438)
- 1540 – Angela Merici, Italian educator and saint, founded the Company of St. Ursula (born 1474)
- 1592 – Gian Paolo Lomazzo, Italian painter (born 1538)
- 1596 – Francis Drake, English captain and explorer (born 1540)

=== 1601–1900 ===
- 1629 – Hieronymus Praetorius, German organist and composer (born 1560)
- 1638 – Gonzalo de Céspedes y Meneses, Spanish author and poet (born 1585)
- 1651 – Abraham Bloemaert, Dutch painter and illustrator (born 1566)
- 1688 – Empress Dowager Xiaozhuang of China (born 1613)
- 1689 – Robert Aske, English merchant and philanthropist (born 1619)
- 1731 – Bartolomeo Cristofori, Italian instrument maker, invented the piano (born 1655)
- 1733 – Thomas Woolston, English theologian and author (born 1669)
- 1740 – Louis Henri, Duke of Bourbon (born 1692)
- 1770 – Philippe Macquer, French historian (born 1720)
- 1794 – Antoine Philippe de La Trémoille, French general (born 1765)
- 1812 – John Perkins, Anglo-Jamaican captain
- 1814 – Johann Gottlieb Fichte, German philosopher and academic (born 1762)
- 1816 – Samuel Hood, 1st Viscount Hood, English admiral and politician (born 1724)
- 1851 – John James Audubon, French-American ornithologist and painter (born 1789)
- 1852 – Paavo Ruotsalainen, Finnish farmer and lay preacher (born 1777)
- 1860 – János Bolyai, Romanian-Hungarian mathematician and academic (born 1802)
- 1873 – Adam Sedgwick, British geologist, Anglican priest and doctoral advisor to Charles Darwin (born 1785)
- 1880 – Edward Middleton Barry, English architect and academic, co-designed the Halifax Town Hall and the Royal Opera House (born 1830)

=== 1901–present ===
- 1901 – Giuseppe Verdi, Italian composer (born 1813)
- 1910 – Thomas Crapper, English plumber and businessman (born 1836)
- 1917 – Ernst Sars, Norwegian historian (born 1835)
- 1919 – Endre Ady, Hungarian poet and journalist (born 1877)
- 1921 – Maurice Buckley, Australian sergeant (born 1891)
- 1922 – Nellie Bly, American journalist and author (born 1864)
- 1927 – Jurgis Matulaitis-Matulevičius, Lithuanian bishop (born 1871)
- 1931 – Nishinoumi Kajirō II, Japanese sumo wrestler, the 25th Yokozuna (born 1880)
- 1940 – Isaac Babel, Russian short story writer, journalist, and playwright (born 1894)
- 1942 – Kaarel Eenpalu, Estonian journalist and politician, Prime Minister of Estonia (born 1888)
- 1951 – Carl Gustaf Emil Mannerheim, Finnish field marshal and politician, 6th President of Finland (born 1867)
- 1956 – Erich Kleiber, Austrian conductor and director (born 1890)
- 1961 – Bernard Friedberg, Austrian scholar and author (born 1876)
- 1963 – John Farrow, Australian-American director, producer, and screenwriter (born 1904)
- 1965 – Abraham Walkowitz, American painter (born 1878)
- 1967 – crew of Apollo 1
  - Roger B. Chaffee, American pilot, engineer, and astronaut (born 1935)
  - Gus Grissom, American pilot and astronaut (born 1926)
  - Ed White, American colonel, engineer, and astronaut (born 1930)
- 1967 – Alphonse Juin, Algerian-French general (born 1888)
- 1970 – Rocco D'Assunta, Italian actor, comedian and playwright (born 1904)
- 1970 – Marietta Blau, Austrian physicist and academic (born 1894)
- 1971 – Jacobo Árbenz, Guatemalan captain and politician, President of Guatemala (born 1913)
- 1972 – Mahalia Jackson, American singer (born 1911)
- 1973 – William Nolde, American colonel (born 1929)
- 1974 – Georgios Grivas, Cypriot general (born 1898)
- 1975 – Bill Walsh, American screenwriter and producer (born 1913)
- 1979 – Victoria Ocampo. Argentine writer (born 1890)
- 1982 – Trần Văn Hương, South Vietnamese politician, 3rd President of South Vietnam, 3rd Vice President of South Vietnam, and 3rd Prime Minister of South Vietnam (born 1902)
- 1983 – Louis de Funès, French actor and screenwriter (born 1914)
- 1986 – Lilli Palmer, German-American actress (born 1914)
- 1987 – Norman McLaren, Scottish-Canadian animator and director (born 1914)
- 1988 – Massa Makan Diabaté, Malian historian, author, and playwright (born 1938)
- 1989 – Thomas Sopwith, English ice hockey player and pilot (born 1888)
- 1993 – André the Giant, French professional wrestler and actor (born 1946)
- 1994 – Claude Akins, American actor (born 1918)
- 1996 – Ralph Yarborough, American colonel, lawyer, and politician (born 1903)
- 2000 – Friedrich Gulda, Austrian pianist and composer (born 1930)
- 2003 – Henryk Jabłoński, Polish historian and politician, President of Poland (born 1909)
- 2004 – Salvador Laurel, Filipino lawyer and politician, 10th Vice President of the Philippines (born 1928)
- 2004 – Jack Paar, American talk show host and author (born 1918)
- 2006 – Gene McFadden, American singer-songwriter and producer (born 1948)
- 2006 – Johannes Rau, German journalist and politician, 8th President of Germany (born 1931)
- 2007 – Yang Chuan-kwang, Taiwanese decathlete, long jumper, and hurdler (born 1933)
- 2008 – Suharto, Indonesian general and politician, 2nd President of Indonesia (born 1921)
- 2008 – Gordon B. Hinckley, American religious leader and author, 15th President of The Church of Jesus Christ of Latter-day Saints (born 1910)
- 2008 – Louie Welch, American businessman and politician, 54th Mayor of Houston (born 1918)
- 2009 – John Updike, American novelist, short story writer, and critic (born 1932)
- 2009 – R. Venkataraman, Indian lawyer and politician, 8th President of India (born 1910)
- 2010 – Zelda Rubinstein, American actress (born 1933)
- 2010 – J. D. Salinger, American soldier and author (born 1919)
- 2010 – Howard Zinn, American historian, author, and activist (born 1922)
- 2011 – Charlie Callas, American comedian and musician (born 1927)
- 2012 – Greg Cook, American football player and sportscaster (born 1946)
- 2012 – Ted Dicks, English composer and screenwriter (born 1928)
- 2012 – Jeannette Hamby, American nurse and politician (born 1933)
- 2012 – Kevin White, American politician, 51st Mayor of Boston (born 1929)
- 2013 – Ivan Bodiul, Ukrainian-Russian politician (born 1918)
- 2013 – Stanley Karnow, American journalist and historian (born 1925)
- 2014 – Pete Seeger, American singer-songwriter, guitarist and activist (born 1919)
- 2014 – Epimaco Velasco, Filipino lawyer and politician, Governor of Cavite (born 1935)
- 2014 – Paul Zorner, German soldier and pilot (born 1920)
- 2015 – Rocky Bridges, American baseball player and coach (born 1927)
- 2015 – David Landau, English-Israeli journalist (born 1947)
- 2015 – Joseph Rotman, Canadian businessman and philanthropist (born 1935)
- 2015 – Charles Hard Townes, American physicist and academic, Nobel Prize laureate (born 1915)
- 2015 – Larry Winters, American wrestler and trainer (born 1956)
- 2016 – Carlos Loyzaga, Filipino basketball player and coach (born 1930)
- 2017 – Emmanuelle Riva, French actress (born 1927)
- 2017 – Arthur H. Rosenfeld, American physicist (born 1926)
- 2018 – Ingvar Kamprad, Founder of IKEA (born 1926)
- 2018 – Mort Walker, American cartoonist (born 1923)
- 2019 – Countess Maya von Schönburg-Glauchau, German socialite (born 1958)
- 2020 – Lina Ben Mhenni, Tunisian Internet activist and blogger (born 1983)
- 2021 – Cloris Leachman, American actress and comedian (born 1926)
- 2021 – Nunuk Nuraini, Indonesian food scientist (born 1961)
- 2022 – Andy Devine, British TV actor (born 1942)

== Holidays and observances ==
- Christian feast day:
  - Angela Merici
  - Blessed Paul Joseph Nardini
  - Devota (Monaco)
  - Enrique de Ossó y Cercelló
  - John Chrysostom (translation of relics) (Anglican, Lutheran, Eastern Orthodox)
  - Sava (Serbia)
  - January 27 (Eastern Orthodox liturgics)
- Day of the lifting of the siege of Leningrad (Russia)
- Liberation of the remaining inmates of Auschwitz-related observances:
  - Holocaust Memorial Day (UK)
  - International Holocaust Remembrance Day
  - Memorial Day (Italy)
  - Other Holocaust Memorial Days observances
