= Ninety-five Theses =

Disputation by Martin Luther on indulgences

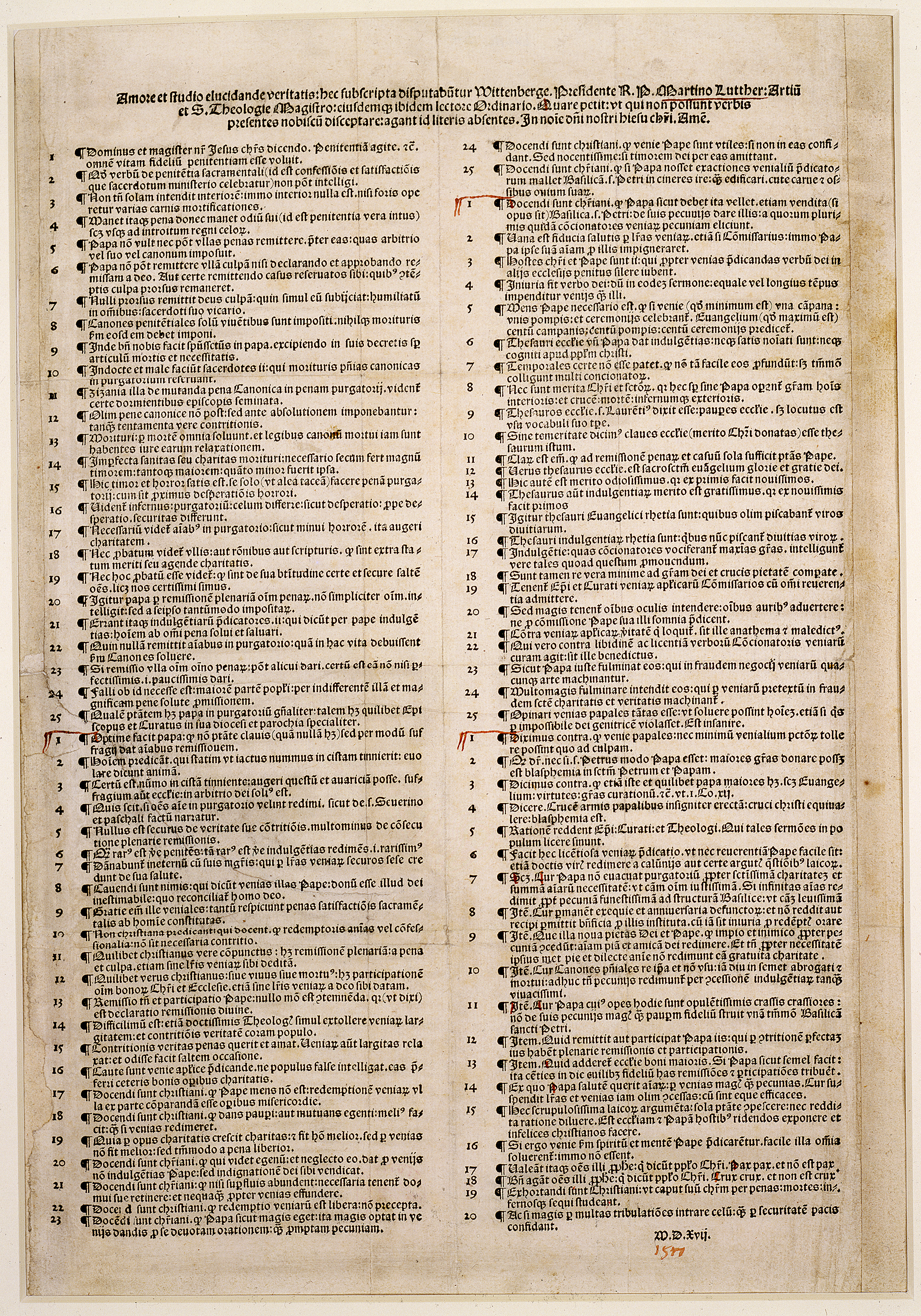
- The 1517 Nuremberg printing of Ninety-five Theses, now housed at the Berlin State Library
- Author: Martin Luther
- Original title: Disputatio pro declaratione virtutis indulgentiarum (Note: Latin: Disputatio pro declaratione virtutis indulgentiarum. The title comes from the 1517 Basel pamphlet printing. The first printings of the Theses use an incipit rather than a title, which summarizes the content. The 1517 Nuremberg placard edition opens Amore et studio elucidande veritatis: hec subscripta disputabuntur Wittenberge. Presidente R.P. Martino Lutther ... Quare petit: vt qui non possunt verbis presentes nobiscum disceptare: agant id literis absentes. Luther usually called them "meine Propositiones" (my propositions). German: Disputation über die Macht und Wirksamkeit des Ablasses)
- Language: Latin
- Publication date: 31 October 1517
- Publication place: Electorate of Saxony, Holy Roman Empire
- Original text: Disputatio pro declaratione virtutis indulgentiarum at Latin Wikisource
- Translation: Ninety-five Theses at Wikisource

The Ninety-five Theses or Disputation on the Power and Efficacy of Indulgences is a list of propositions for an academic disputation written in 1517 by Martin Luther, then a professor of moral theology at the University of Wittenberg, Germany. (Note: At the time, Luther was the youngest member of the theological faculty at the university, which was still known for its medieval theology. Luther was later promoted to take over the chair of Biblical studies of the theological staff of Wittenberg as the successor of Johann von Staupitz.) The Theses are retrospectively considered to have launched the Protestant Reformation and the birth of Protestantism, despite various quasi- or proto-Protestant groups having existed previously.

The Theses aired contemporary theological misgivings about the theory and practice of indulgences and their relation to repentance, penance and papal authority. This was triggered by Catholic clergy who were selling plenary indulgences, which were certificates supposed to reduce the punishment in purgatory required for sins committed by the saved purchasers or their loved ones.

In the Theses, Luther claimed that the repentance required by Christ in order for sins to be forgiven involves inner spiritual repentance rather than merely external sacramental confession. He argued that indulgences led Christians to avoid true repentance and sorrow for sin, believing that they could forgo it by obtaining an indulgence. These indulgences, according to Luther, discouraged Christians from giving to the poor and performing other acts of mercy, which he attributed to a belief that indulgence certificates were more spiritually valuable. Though Luther claimed that his positions on indulgences accorded with those of Pope Leo X, the Theses challenge a 14th-century papal bull stating that the pope could use the treasury of merit and the good deeds of past saints to forgive temporal punishment for sins. The Theses are framed as propositions to be argued in debate rather than necessarily representing Luther's opinions, but Luther later clarified his views in the Explanations of the Disputation Concerning the Value of Indulgences.

== Background ==
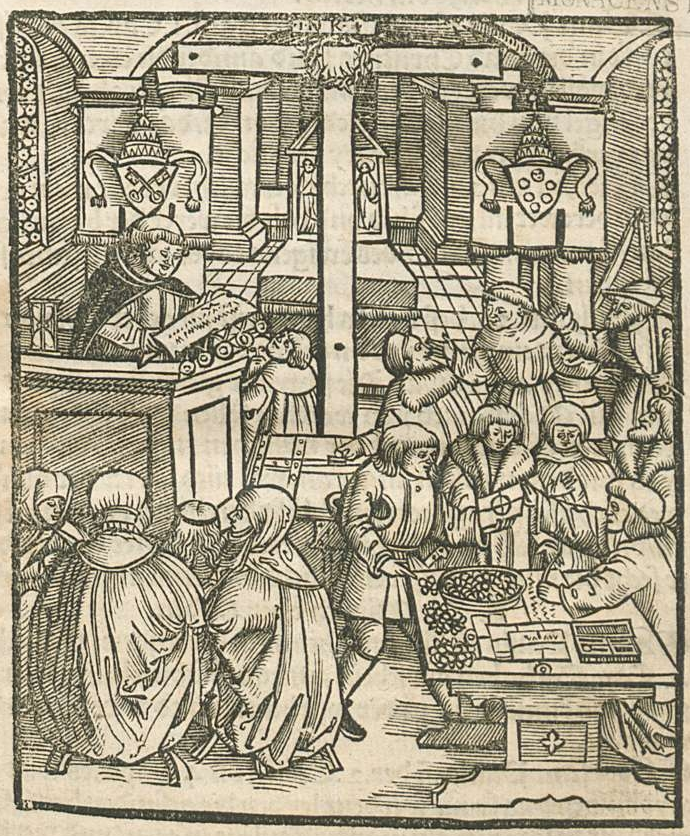
Woodcut of an indulgence-seller in a church from a 1521 pamphlet

Martin Luther, professor of moral theology at the University of Wittenberg and town preacher, wrote the Ninety-five Theses against the contemporary practice of the church with respect to indulgences. In the Roman Catholic Church, which was practically the only Christian church in Western Europe at the time, indulgences were part of the economy of salvation. In this system, when Christians sin and confess, they are forgiven and no longer stand to receive eternal punishment in hell, but may still be liable to temporal punishment. This punishment could be satisfied by the penitent's performing works of mercy. If the temporal punishment is not satisfied during life, it needs to be satisfied in the afterlife in purgatory, a place believed by Catholics to exist between heaven and hell. By indulgence (which may be understood in the sense of "kindness"), this temporal punishment could be lessened. Under abuses of the system of indulgences, clergy benefited by selling indulgences, and the pope gave official sanction in exchange for a fee.

Popes are empowered to grant plenary indulgences, which provide complete satisfaction for any remaining temporal punishment due to sins, and these were purchased on behalf of people believed to be in purgatory. This led to the popular saying, "As soon as the coin in the coffer rings, the soul from purgatory springs". Theologians at the University of Paris criticized this saying late in the 15th century. Earlier critics of indulgences included John Wycliffe, who denied that the pope had jurisdiction over purgatory. Jan Hus and his followers had advocated a more severe system of penance, in which indulgences were not available. Johannes von Wesel had also attacked indulgences late in the 15th century. Political rulers had an interest in controlling indulgences because local economies suffered when the money for indulgences left a given territory. Rulers often sought to receive a portion of the proceeds or prohibited indulgences altogether, as Duke George did in Luther's Electoral Saxony.

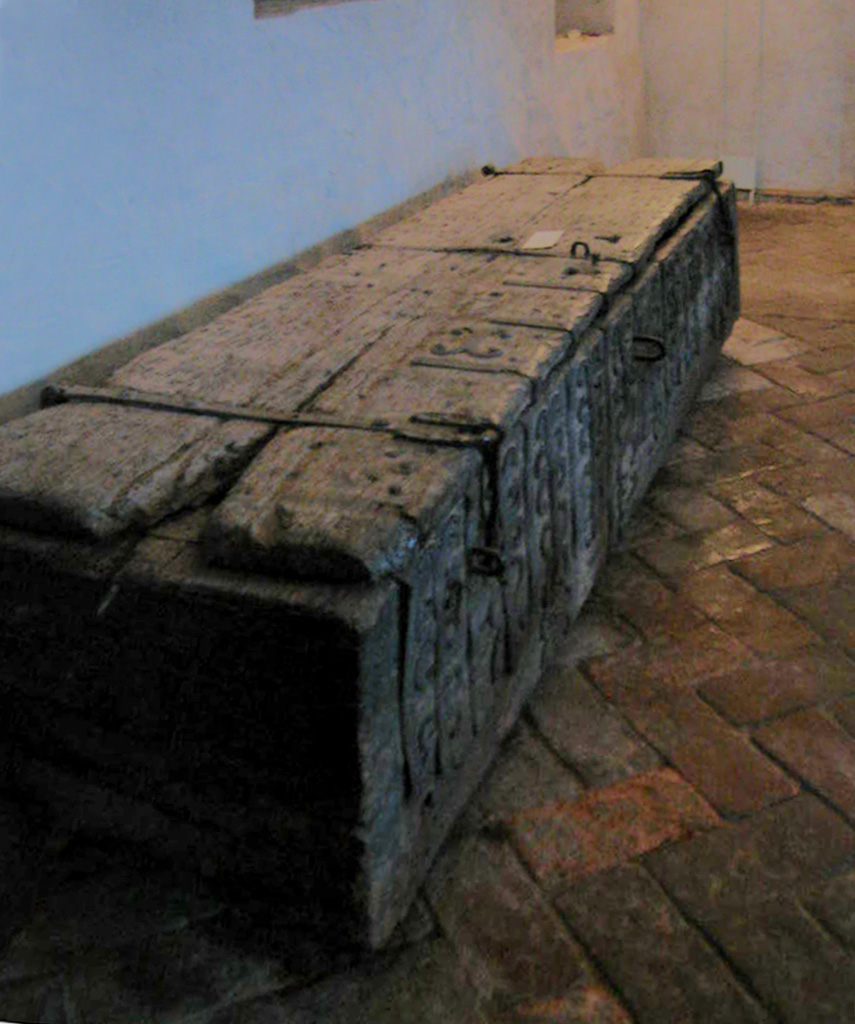
Johann Tetzel's coffer, now on display at St. Nicholaus church in Jüterbog, Germany

In 1515, Pope Leo X granted a plenary indulgence intended to finance the construction of St. Peter's Basilica in Rome. It would apply to almost any sin, including adultery and theft. All other indulgence preaching was to cease for the eight years in which it was offered. Indulgence preachers were given strict instructions on how the indulgence was to be preached, and they were much more laudatory of the indulgence than those of earlier indulgences. Johann Tetzel was commissioned to preach and offer the indulgence in 1517, and his campaign in cities near Wittenberg drew many Wittenbergers to travel to these cities and purchase them, since sales had been prohibited in Wittenberg and other Saxon cities.

Luther's views were informed by his experience at All Saints' Church, Wittenberg. By venerating the large collection of relics at the church, one could receive an indulgence. Luther had preached as early as 1514 against the abuse of indulgences and the way they cheapened grace rather than requiring true repentance. Luther became especially concerned in 1517 when his parishioners, returning from purchasing Tetzel's indulgences, claimed that they no longer needed to repent and change their lives to be forgiven of sin. After hearing what Tetzel had said about indulgences in his sermons, Luther began to study the issue more carefully and contacted experts on the subject. He preached about indulgences several times in 1517, explaining that true repentance was better than purchasing an indulgence. He taught that receiving an indulgence presupposed that the penitent had confessed and repented; otherwise, it was worthless. A truly repentant sinner would also not seek an indulgence because they loved God's righteousness and desired the inward punishment of their sin. These sermons seem to have ceased from April to October 1517, presumably while Luther was writing the Ninety-five Theses. He composed a Treatise on Indulgences, apparently in early autumn 1517. It is a cautious and searching examination of the subject. He contacted church leaders on the subject by letter, including his superior Hieronymus Schulz, Bishop of Brandenburg, sometime on or before 31 October, when he sent the Theses to Archbishop Albert of Brandenburg.

== Content ==
The first thesis states, "When our Lord and Master Jesus Christ said, 'Repent,' he willed the entire life of believers to be one of repentance." In the first few theses, Luther develops the idea of repentance as the Christian's inner struggle with sin rather than the external system of sacramental confession. Theses 5–7 then state that the pope, whom Luther called the Vicar of Christ on earth, can only release people from the punishments he has administered himself or through the church's system of penance, not the guilt of sin. The pope can only announce God's forgiveness of the guilt of sin in his name. In theses 14–29, Luther challenged common beliefs about purgatory. Theses 14–16 discuss the idea that the punishment of purgatory can be likened to the fear and despair felt by dying people. In theses 17–24, he asserts that nothing can be definitively said about the spiritual state of people in purgatory. He denies that the pope has any power over people in purgatory in theses 25 and 26. In theses 27–29, he attacks the idea that as soon as payment is made, the payer's loved one is released from purgatory. He sees it as encouraging sinful greed and says it is impossible to be certain because only God has ultimate power in forgiving punishments in purgatory.

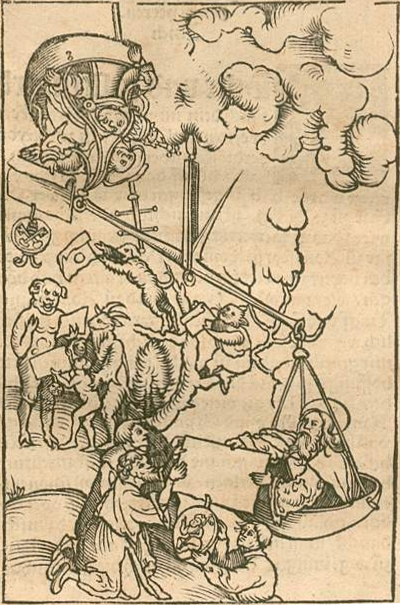
1525 woodcut of forgiveness from Christ outweighing the pope's indulgences

Theses 30–34 deal with the false certainty Luther believed the indulgence preachers offered Christians. Since no one knows whether a person is truly repentant, a letter assuring a person of his forgiveness is dangerous. In theses 35 and 36, he attacks the idea that an indulgence makes repentance unnecessary. This leads to the conclusion that the truly repentant person, who alone may benefit from the indulgence, has already received the only benefit the indulgence provides. Truly repentant Christians have already, according to Luther, been forgiven of the penalty as well as the guilt of sin. In thesis 37, he states that indulgences are not necessary for Christians to receive all the benefits provided by Christ. Theses 39 and 40 argue that indulgences make true repentance more difficult. True repentance desires God's punishment of sin, but indulgences teach one to avoid punishment, since that is the purpose of purchasing the indulgence.

In theses 41–47, Luther criticizes indulgences on the basis that they discourage works of mercy by those who purchase them. Here, he begins to use the phrase, "Christians are to be taught..." to state how he thinks people should be instructed on the value of indulgences. They should be taught that giving to the poor is incomparably more important than buying indulgences, that buying an indulgence rather than giving to the poor invites God's wrath, and that doing good works makes a person better while buying indulgences does not. In theses 48–52, Luther takes the side of the pope, saying that if the pope knew what was being preached in his name, he would rather St. Peter's Basilica be burned down than "built up with the skin, flesh, and bones of his sheep". In theses 53–55, Luther critiques the restrictions on preaching while the indulgence was being offered.

In theses 56–66, Martin Luther criticizes the doctrine of the treasury of merit on which the doctrine of indulgences is based. He states that everyday Christians do not understand the doctrine and are being misled. For Luther, the true treasure of the church is the gospel of Jesus Christ. This treasure tends to be hated because it makes "the first last", in the words of Matthew 19:30 and 20:16. Luther uses metaphor and wordplay to describe the treasures of the gospel as nets to catch wealthy people, whereas the treasures of indulgences are nets to catch the wealth of men.

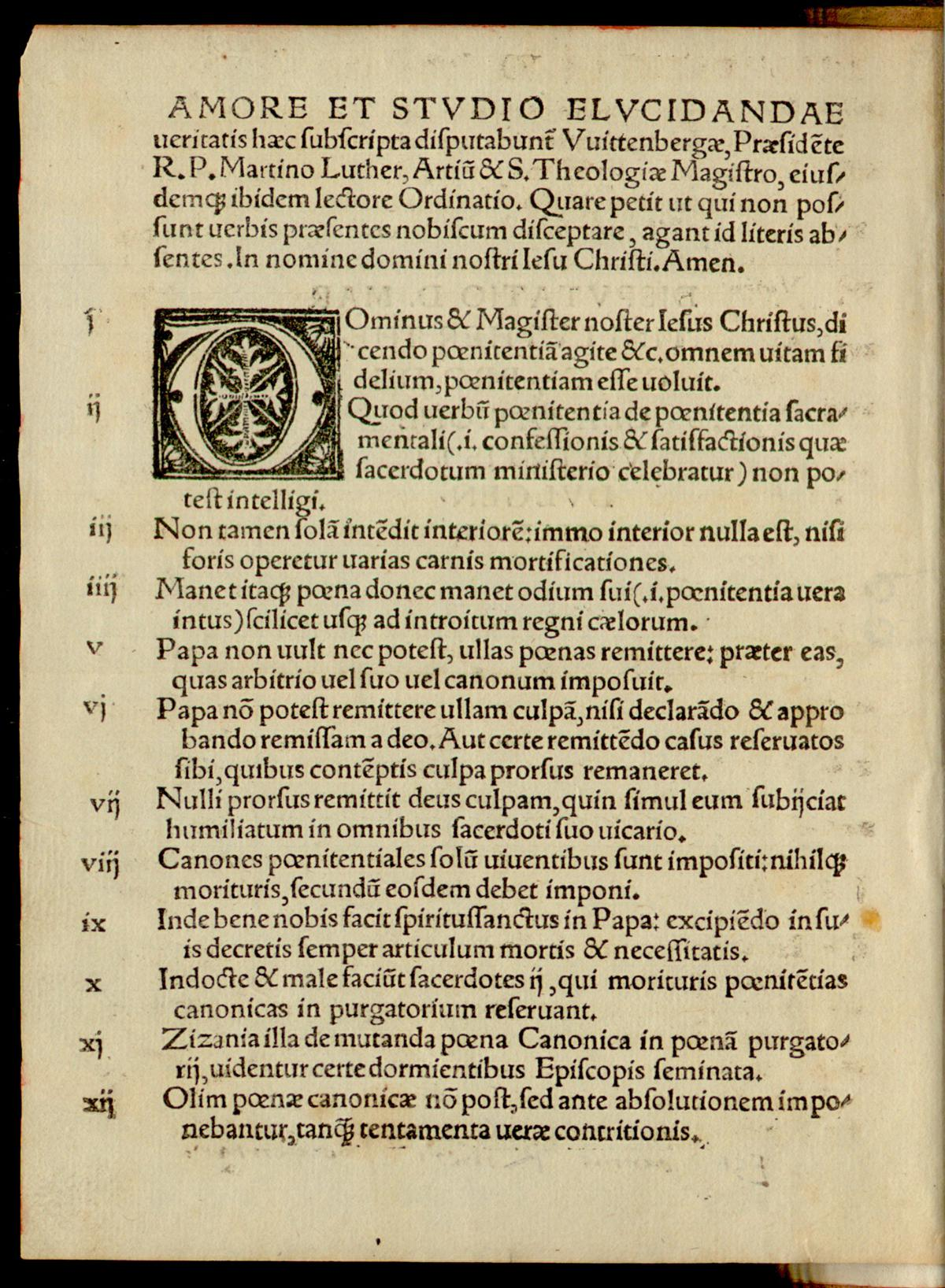
First page of the 1517 Basel printing of the Theses as a pamphlet

In theses 67–80, Luther discusses further the problems with the way indulgences are being preached, as he had done in the letter to Archbishop Albert. The preachers have been promoting indulgences as the greatest of the graces available from the church, but they actually only promote greed. He points out that bishops have been commanded to offer reverence to indulgence preachers who enter their jurisdiction, but bishops are also charged with protecting their people from preachers who preach contrary to the pope's intention. He then attacks the belief allegedly propagated by the preachers that the indulgence could forgive one who had violated the Virgin Mary. Luther states that indulgences cannot take away the guilt of even the lightest of venial sins. He labels several other alleged statements of the indulgence preachers as blasphemy: that Saint Peter could not have granted a greater indulgence than the current one, and that the indulgence cross with the papal arms is as worthy as the cross of Christ.

Luther lists several criticisms advanced by laypeople against indulgences in theses 81–91. He presents these as difficult objections his congregants are bringing rather than his own criticisms. How should he answer those who ask why the pope does not simply empty purgatory if it is in his power? What should he say to those who ask why anniversary masses for the dead, which were for the sake of those in purgatory, continued for those who had been redeemed by an indulgence? Luther claimed that it seemed strange to some that pious people in purgatory could be redeemed by living impious people. Luther also mentions the question of why the very rich pope requires money from poor believers to build St. Peter's Basilica. Luther claims that ignoring these questions risks allowing people to ridicule the pope. He appeals to the pope's financial interest, saying that if the preachers limited their preaching in accordance with Luther's positions on indulgences (which he claimed was also the pope's position), the objections would cease to be relevant. Luther closes the Theses by exhorting Christians to imitate Christ even if it brings pain and suffering. Enduring punishment and entering heaven is preferable to false security.

== Luther's intent ==
The Theses are written as propositions to be argued in a formal academic disputation, though there is no evidence that such an event ever took place. In the heading of the Theses, Luther invited interested scholars from other cities to participate. Holding such a debate was a privilege Luther held as a doctor, and it was not an unusual form of academic inquiry. Luther prepared twenty sets of theses for disputation at Wittenberg between 1516 and 1521. Andreas Karlstadt had written a set of such theses in April 1517, more radical in theological terms than Luther's, and posted them on the door of All Saints' Church, as Luther was alleged to have done with the Ninety-five Theses. Karlstadt posted his theses at a time when the relics of the church were placed on display, and this may have been considered a provocative gesture. Similarly, Luther posted the Ninety-five Theses on the eve of All Saints' Day, the most important day of the year for the display of relics at All Saints' Church.

Luther's theses were intended to begin a debate among academics, not a popular revolution, but there are indications that he saw his action as prophetic and significant. Around this time, he began using the name "Luther" and sometimes "Eleutherius", Greek for "free", rather than "Luder". This seems to refer to his being free from the scholastic theology which he had argued against earlier that year. Luther later claimed not to have desired the Theses to be widely distributed. Elizabeth Eisenstein has argued that his claimed surprise at their success may have involved self-deception, and Hans Hillerbrand has claimed that Luther was certainly intending to instigate a large controversy. At times, Luther seems to use the academic nature of the Theses as a cover to allow him to attack established beliefs while being able to deny that he intended to attack church teaching. Since writing a set of theses for a disputation does not necessarily commit the author to those views, Luther could deny that he held the most incendiary ideas in the Theses.

== Distribution and publication ==
On 31 October 1517, Luther sent a letter to the Archbishop of Mainz, Albert of Brandenburg, under whose authority the indulgences were being sold. In the letter, Luther addresses the archbishop out of a loyal desire to alert him to the pastoral problems created by the indulgence sermons. He assumes that Albert is unaware of what is being preached under his authority, and speaks out of concern that the people are being led away from the gospel, and that the indulgence preaching may bring shame to Albert's name. Luther does not condemn indulgences or the current doctrine regarding them, nor even the sermons which had been preached themselves, as he had not seen them firsthand. Instead, he states his concern regarding the misunderstandings of the people about indulgences, which have been fostered by the preaching, such as the belief that any sin could be forgiven by indulgences or that the guilt as well as the punishment for sin could be forgiven by an indulgence. In a postscript, Luther wrote that Albert could find some theses on the matter enclosed with his letter, so that he could see the uncertainty surrounding the doctrine of indulgences in contrast to the preachers who spoke so confidently of the benefits of indulgences.

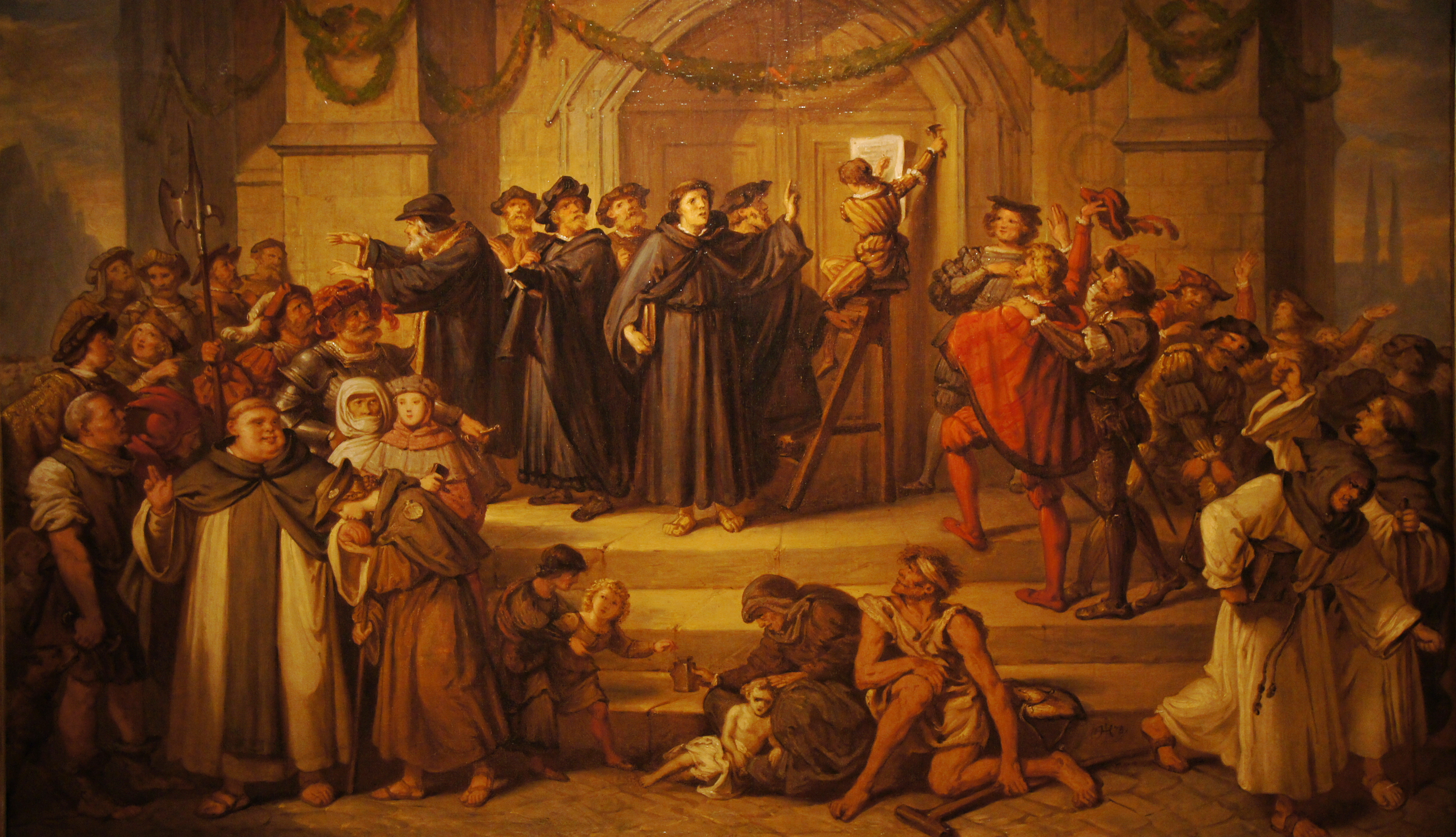
This 19th-century painting by Julius Hübner sensationalizes Luther's posting of the Theses before a crowd. In reality, posting theses for a disputation would have been routine.

It was customary when proposing a disputation to have the theses printed by the university press and publicly posted. No copies of a Wittenberg printing of the Ninety-five Theses have survived, but this is not surprising as Luther was not famous and the importance of the document was not recognized. (Note: The Wittenberg printer was Johann Rhau-Grunenberg. A Rhau-Grunenberg printing of Luther's "Disputation Against Scholastic Theology", published just eight weeks before the Ninety-five Theses, was discovered in 1983. Its form is very similar to that of the Nuremberg printing of the Ninety-five Theses. This is evidence for a Rhau-Grunenberg printing of the Ninety-five Theses, as the Nuremberg printing may be a copy of the Wittenberg printing.) In Wittenberg, the university statutes demand that theses be posted on every church door in the city, but Philip Melanchthon, who first mentioned the posting of the Theses, only mentioned the door of All Saints' Church. (Note: Georg Rörer, Luther's scribe, claimed in a note that Luther posted the theses to every church door.) Melanchthon also claimed that Luther posted the Theses on 31 October, but this conflicts with several of Luther's statements about the course of events, and Luther always claimed that he brought his objections through proper channels rather than inciting a public controversy. It is possible that while Luther later saw the 31 October letter to Albert as the beginning of the Reformation, he did not post the Theses to the church door until mid-November, but he may not have posted them on the door at all. Regardless, the Theses were well known among the Wittenberg intellectual elite soon after Luther sent them to Albert.

The Theses were copied and distributed to interested parties soon after Luther sent the letter to Archbishop Albert. The Latin Theses were printed in a four-page pamphlet in Basel, and as placards in Leipzig and Nuremberg. In all, several hundred copies of the Latin Theses were printed in Germany in 1517. Kaspar Nützel in Nuremberg translated them into German later that year, and copies of this translation were sent to several interested parties across Germany, but it was not necessarily printed. (Note: No copies of the 1517 German translation survive.)

== Reaction ==
Albert seems to have received Luther's letter with the Theses around the end of November. He requested the opinion of theologians at the University of Mainz and conferred with his advisers. His advisers recommended that he have Luther prohibited from preaching against indulgences in accordance with the indulgence bull. Albert requested such action from the Roman Curia. In Rome, Luther was immediately perceived as a threat. In February 1518, Pope Leo asked the head of the Augustinian Hermits, Luther's religious order, to convince him to stop spreading his ideas about indulgences. Sylvester Mazzolini was also appointed to write an opinion which would be used in the trial against him. Mazzolini wrote A Dialogue against Martin Luther's Presumptuous Theses concerning the Power of the Pope, which focused on Luther's questioning of the pope's authority rather than his complaints about indulgence preaching. Luther received a summons to Rome in August 1518. He responded with Explanations of the Disputation Concerning the Value of Indulgences, in which he attempted to clear himself of the charge that he was attacking the pope. As he set down his views more extensively, Luther seems to have recognized that the implications of his beliefs set him further from official teaching than he initially knew. He later said he might not have begun the controversy had he known where it would lead. The Explanations have been called Luther's first Reformation work.

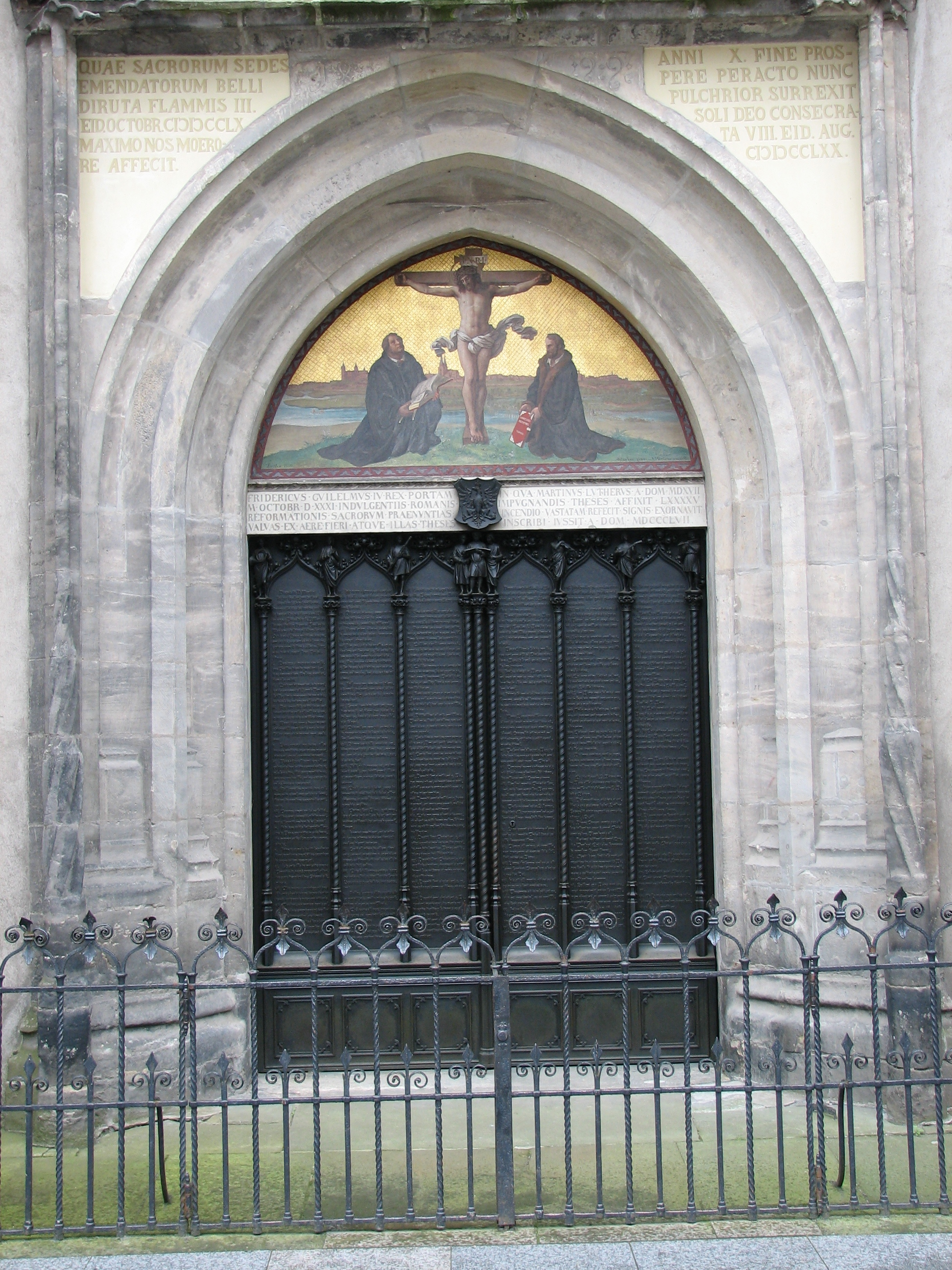
These commemorative doors were installed at All Saints' Church, Wittenberg, on Luther's 375th birthday in 1858.

Johann Tetzel responded to the Theses by calling for Luther to be burnt for heresy and having theologian Konrad Wimpina write 106 theses against Luther's work. Tetzel defended these in a disputation before the University of Frankfurt on the Oder in January 1518. 800 copies of the printed disputation were sent to be sold in Wittenberg, but students of the university seized them from the bookseller and burned them. Luther became increasingly fearful that the situation was out of hand and that he would be in danger. To placate his opponents, he published a Sermon on Indulgences and Grace, which did not challenge the pope's authority. This pamphlet, written in German, was very short and easy for laypeople to understand. Luther's first widely successful work, it was reprinted twenty times. Tetzel responded with a point-by-point refutation, citing heavily from the Bible and important theologians. (Note: Tetzel's pamphlet is titled Rebuttal Against a Presumptuous Sermon of Twenty Erroneous Articles.) His pamphlet was not nearly as popular as Luther's. Luther's reply to Tetzel's pamphlet, on the other hand, was another publishing success for Luther. (Note: Luther's reply to Tetzel's Rebuttal is titled Concerning the Freedom of the Sermon on Papal Indulgences and Grace. Luther intends to free the Sermon from Tetzel's insults.)

Another prominent opponent of the Theses was Johann Eck, Luther's friend and a theologian at the University of Ingolstadt. Eck wrote a refutation, intended for the Bishop of Eichstätt, entitled the Obelisks. This was in reference to the obelisks used to mark heretical passages in texts in the Middle Ages. It was a harsh and unexpected personal attack, charging Luther with heresy and stupidity. Luther responded privately with the Asterisks, titled after the asterisk marks then used to highlight important texts. Luther's response was angry, and he expressed the opinion that Eck did not understand the matter on which he wrote. The dispute between Luther and Eck would become public in the 1519 Leipzig Debate.

Luther was summoned by the authority of the pope to defend himself against charges of heresy before Thomas Cajetan at Augsburg in October 1518. Cajetan did not allow Luther to argue with him over his alleged heresies, but he did identify two points of controversy. The first was against the 58th thesis, which stated that the pope could not use the treasury of merit to forgive temporal punishment of sin. This contradicted the papal bull Unigenitus promulgated by Clement VI in 1343. The second point was whether one could be assured that one had been forgiven when one's sin had been absolved by a priest. Luther's Explanations on thesis seven asserted that one could be based on God's promise, but Cajetan argued that the humble Christian should never presume to be certain of their standing before God. Luther refused to recant and requested that the case be reviewed by university theologians. This request was denied, so Luther appealed to the pope before leaving Augsburg. Luther was finally excommunicated in 1521 after he burned the papal bull threatening him to recant or face excommunication.

== Legacy ==
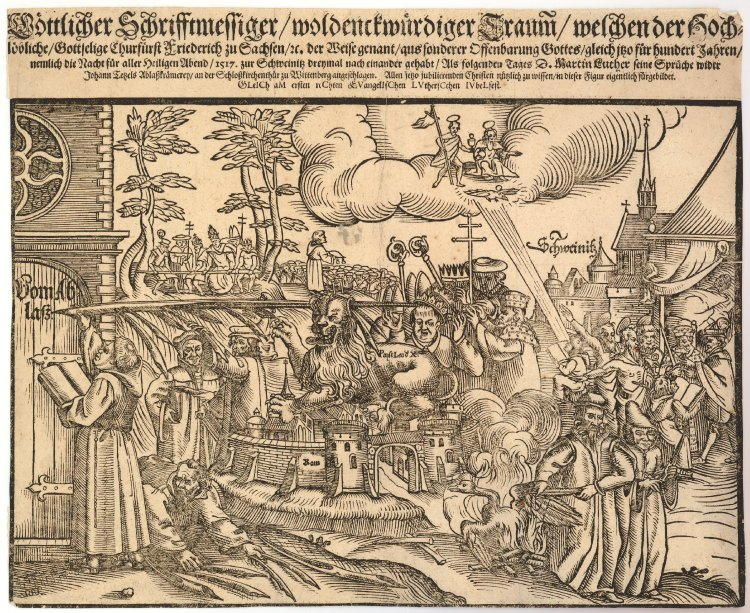
Print made for the 1617 Reformation Jubilee showing Luther inscribing the Theses on the Wittenberg church door with a giant quill.

The indulgence controversy set off by the Theses was the beginning of the Reformation, a schism in the Roman Catholic Church which initiated profound and lasting social and political change in Europe. Luther later stated that the issue of indulgences was insignificant relative to controversies which he would enter into later, such as his debate with Erasmus over the bondage of the will, as well as his definition of Law and Gospel. Luther later wrote that at the time that he wrote the Theses, he remained a "papist", and he did not seem to think the Theses represented a break with established Roman Catholic doctrine. But it was out of the indulgences controversy that the movement which would be called the Reformation began, and the controversy propelled Luther to the leadership position he would hold in that movement. The Theses also made evident that Luther believed the church was not preaching properly and that this put the laity in danger. Further, the Theses contradicted the decree of Pope Clement VI, in 1343, that indulgences are the treasury of the church. This disregard for papal authority presaged later conflicts.

31 October 1517, the day Luther sent the Theses to Albert, was commemorated as the beginning of the Reformation as early as 1527, when Luther and his friends raised a glass of beer to commemorate the "trampling out of indulgences". The posting of the Theses was established in the historiography of the Reformation as the beginning of the movement by Philip Melanchthon in his 1548 Historia de vita et actis Lutheri. During the 1617 Reformation Jubilee, the centenary of 31 October was celebrated by a procession to the Wittenberg Church, where Luther was believed to have posted the Theses. An engraving was made showing Luther writing the Theses on the door of the church with a gigantic quill. The quill penetrates the head of a lion symbolizing Pope Leo X. In 1668, 31 October was made Reformation Day, an annual holiday in Electoral Saxony, which spread to other Lutheran lands. 31 October 2017, the 500th Anniversary of Reformation Day, was celebrated with a national public holiday throughout Germany.
