= Jonathan Berman =

American film producer, director, screenwriter, and academic

- Born: Brooklyn, New York, U.S.
- Education: McGill University, BA; Bard College, MFA
- Occupations: Film director, film producer, screenwriter, academic
- Years active: 1986–present
- Employer: California State University San Marcos
- Known for: The Shvitz (1993), My Friend Paul (1999), Commune (2005), Calling All Earthlings (2018)
- Title: Professor

Jonathan Berman is an American film producer, director, screenwriter, and academic. He is best known for his documentary work as producer and film director of The Shvitz (1993), My Friend Paul (1999), Commune (2005), and Calling All Earthlings (2018). His non-fiction feature films explore subculture and identity, depicting how alternative people, groups and ideas are represented in media. Berman currently serves as a professor at California State University San Marcos.

== Biography ==
Jonathan Berman was born in Brooklyn, NY and raised in Merrick, New York. His father, Herb Berman was a veteran of World War II and a community newspapers publisher in Brooklyn. Berman graduated from McGill University in Montreal with a B.A. degree and received an M.F.A. from Bard College.

=== Beginnings ===
Berman began his film career in 1986, when he joined as an assistant film editor and production assistant several entertainment, art and documentary projects in New York including Pee-wee's Playhouse (1987), Costa Rica: A Child in the Wind and The Toxic Avenger Part II (1989).

== Filmmaking career ==
His directorial debut, The Shvitz (1993) was a 16mm black and white documentary depicting traditions revolving around the steambaths once popular in the Eastern European enclaves in New York. The project was supported by the National Endowment for the Arts. The next documentary film, My Friend Paul (1999), observed the nexus of mental illness, friendship, and crime and was one of the first films that ITVS, a division of US Public TV, produced on the subject of mental illness. It has been broadcast on networks worldwide, including US PBS, the Sundance Channel, Planète+, and Netflix. In 1999, Berman co-wrote the story with director Bruno de Almeida for the independent comedy feature On The Run starring Soprano's regulars Michael Imperioli and John Ventimiglia. His documentary Commune (2006) explores an archetypal 1960s California commune, the Black Bear Ranch, which discover that the path to utopia is fraught with struggle. The film opened numerous festivals (Munich, Jerusalem, Karlovy Vary), played on TV (Sundance Channel, BBC, others worldwide), and received positive reviews from the New York Times, Variety, and other publications. His fourth film, Calling All Earthlings (2018) examines California High Desert's UFO counterculture cult and Integratron, a structure near Landers, California built by George Van Tassel. The film gained critical acclaim from a number of media sources including Newsweek and the Boston Globe.

== Filmography ==
Year	Title	Credit	Notes
2018	Calling All Earthlings	Director/Producer/Writer	San Diego Film Week (Award Nominee); Illuminate Film Festival (2018 Award Winner: Debut Feature Competition Jury Prize)
2006	Commune	Producer/Writer	Documentary
2002	Down to Earth	Producer	Documentary
2000	Maternity Ward	Producer	T.V. Series
2000	Sabbath in Paradise	U.S Producer	Documentary (Germany/USA)
1999	Final Rinse	Associate producer	Documentary
1999	On the Run	Co-writer	Film
1999	My Friend Paul	Director/Producer/Writer	Slamdance Film Festival (Grand Jury Prize Nominee)
1993	The Shvitz	Director/Producer/Writer	Documentary
