= Unigenitus (1343) =

Papal bull declaring a Jubillee year every 50 years

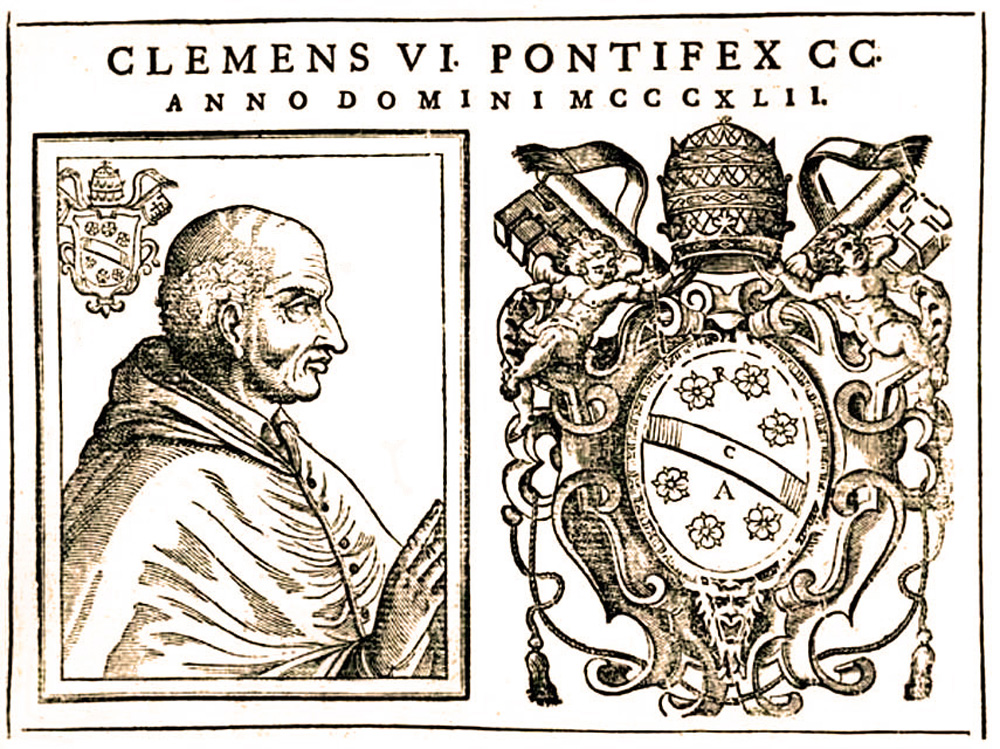
Pope Clement VI

Unigenitus (named for its Latin opening words Unigenitus Dei filius, or 'Only-Begotten Son of God') is a papal bull promulgated by Pope Clement VI on January 27, 1343. It designated the year 1350 as a year of Jubilee and set the tradition for a Jubilee to be held every fifty years. The bull dogmatically defined the existence of an infinite treasury of merits in the Catholic Church.

This doctrine was later contested in Martin Luther's Theses 56–58 of his Ninety-five Theses, stating that "the treasures of the Church from which the pope grants indulgences are not the merits of Christ and the saints". Pope Leo X's condemnation of Luther in the bull Exsurge Domine was a key event starting the Reformation.

== Historical context ==
In 1300, Pope Boniface VIII proclaimed the year A.D. 1300 as a year of Jubilee and set a schedule wherein a Jubilee year would be held every 100 years. However, upon the election of Pope Clement VI in 1342, the Roman people, suffering the absence of their Pope and general turmoil in the Italian Papal States, requested Clement to hold a Jubilee. Clement obliged, and in 1343 promulgated the bull Unigenitus, which set the year A.D. 1350 as a year of Jubilee.

== Content ==
Clement VI begins by explaining that the merits of Jesus Christ are infinitely superabundant and are thus stored as a thesaurus, or treasure, within the Catholic Church. Added to this are the merits of the Virgin Mary and the Saints:

Thus, furthermore, so that the compassion of His outpouring may not be rendered useless, vain, or superfluous, He accrued a treasure for the Church Militant, the blessed Father wishing to gather it up for His sons, so that thus it may be for men who use it an infinite treasure which makes them partakers in the love of God...To the pile of which treasure the merits of the Blessed Mother of God and of all the elect, from the first even to the last, are known to provide assistance ...

Clement VI then cites the historical precedent of Pope Boniface VIII's declaration of a Jubilee in the year 1300 and every hundred years thereafter. He changes this to every fiftieth year in accord with Mosaic Law and because of the common desire for a Jubilee amongst the people:

We, moreover, giving attention to the fact that the fiftieth year in Mosaic law (which God did not come to dissolve but to spiritually fulfill) is reckoned the Jubilee of remission and joy; and a sacred number of days by which remission comes about by law, and the fact that the very number fifty in the testaments, in the old indeed by the provision of the law, in the new by the visible sending of the Holy Ghost on the Apostles, through Whom the remission of sins is given, is singularly honored. And the fact that the many grand mysteries of the divine Scriptures correspond to this and the cry of our special Roman people...we have commanded, per the counsel of our brethren cardinals, that the aforementioned grant of indulgence be restored to the fiftieth year ...

Lastly, Clement sets forth the requirements for the attainment of an indulgence during the year of Jubilee. Those living in Rome must visit the basilicas of the Apostles Peter and Paul and the Lateran for at least 30 successive days; foreigners for at least 15 successive days. All must be truly repentant and must have made a good Confession:

... all the faithful who are truly penitent & have confessed in the upcoming 1350th year from the Nativity of Our Lord and thereafter for all future time in each subsequent fiftieth year, visit, for the sake of devotion in the manner described above, the basilicas of the same Apostles, Peter and Paul, and the church of the Lateran Namely so that whosoever will have wished to obtain an indulgence of this kind, they are obligated to visit the aforementioned basilicas and churches, if Roman, for at least thirty days, if on the other hand a pilgrim or foreigner, in a similar way for at least fifteen days: adding that even those who would go to those basilicas and churches for the sake of obtaining an indulgence, after the journey has begun were legitimately prevented from being able to reach the city in that year, or who will have died on route or in the said city with the predetermined number of days not completed, they may obtain the same indulgence if truly repentant (as has been said) and having confessed.

== Martin Luther ==
On 12–15 October 1518, at the Imperial Diet of Augsburg, Cardinal Cajetan questioned Martin Luther about Luther's views on indulgences, as he had seen them expressed in Luther's Sermon on Penance, as well as his 1518 Resolutions on Indulgences (Resolutiones disputationum de indulgentiarum virtute, WA vol. 1, pp. 522–628), which elaborated on the famous Ninety-five Theses. Cajetan thought that Luther's views directly contradicted the papal bull Unigenitus, and that Conclusion VII from the Resolutions on Indulgences taught a "new and erroneous doctrine" (WA, vol. 2.13). Luther answered that the papal bull carried no weight with him because it abused and twisted the words of scripture, which were, in contrast, correctly interpreted in his own writings. In the next day of his questioning, having asked to be heard in writing, Luther produced a lengthy scroll attacking the papal decree and the pope in disputational style, and adducing a lot of scriptural material to support his view on the sacraments. Cajetan was not impressed, but the questioning ended without any retraction from Luther.
