= Sabbath in Paradise =

- Directed by: Claudia Heuermann
- Produced by: Claudia Heuermann; Jonathan Berman; Andreas Wildbihler
- Starring: Anthony Coleman, Marc Ribot, Andy Statman, David Krakauer, Frank London, John Zorn
- Release date: 15 November 1997
- Running time: 85 minutes
- Country: Germany
- Language: English

Sabbath in Paradise is a documentary film by Claudia Heuermann examining contemporary Jewish musical culture in New York's avant garde Jazz scene in the 1990s. It features concert footage and interviews with Anthony Coleman, Marc Ribot, Andy Statman, David Krakauer, Frank London, John Zorn and others.
