= AD 98 =

AD 98 in various calendars
- Gregorian calendar: AD 98; XCVIII
- Ab urbe condita: 851
- Assyrian calendar: 4848
- Balinese saka calendar: 19–20
- Bengali calendar: −496 – −495
- Berber calendar: 1048
- Buddhist calendar: 642
- Burmese calendar: −540
- Byzantine calendar: 5606–5607
- Chinese calendar: 丁酉年 (Fire Rooster); 2795 or 2588 — to — 戊戌年 (Earth Dog); 2796 or 2589
- Coptic calendar: −186 – −185
- Discordian calendar: 1264
- Ethiopian calendar: 90–91
- Hebrew calendar: 3858–3859
- Hindu calendars
- Vikram Samvat: 154–155
- Shaka Samvat: 19–20
- Kali Yuga: 3198–3199
- Holocene calendar: 10098
- Iranian calendar: 524 BP – 523 BP
- Islamic calendar: 540 BH – 539 BH
- Javanese calendar: N/A
- Julian calendar: AD 98; XCVIII
- Korean calendar: 2431
- Minguo calendar: 1814 before ROC 民前1814年
- Nanakshahi calendar: −1370
- Seleucid era: 409/410 AG
- Thai solar calendar: 640–641
- Tibetan calendar: མེ་མོ་བྱ་ལོ་ (female Fire-Bird); 224 or −157 or −929 — to — ས་ཕོ་ཁྱི་ལོ་ (male Earth-Dog); 225 or −156 or −928

AD 98 (XCVIII) was a common year starting on Monday of the Julian calendar. At the time, it was known as the Year of the Consulship of Augustus and Traianus (or, less frequently, year 851 Ab urbe condita). The denomination AD 98 for this year has been used since the early medieval period, when the Anno Domini calendar era became the prevalent method in Europe for naming years.

== Events ==
=== By place ===
==== Roman Empire ====
- January 1 – Emperor Nerva suffers a stroke during a private audience.
- January 27 – Nerva dies of a fever at his villa in the Gardens of Sallust and is succeeded by his adopted son Trajan. Trajan is the first Roman Emperor born in Italica, near Seville. A brilliant soldier and administrator, he enters Rome without ceremony and wins over the public. Continuing the policies of Augustus, Vespasian and Nerva, he restores the Senate to its full status in the government and begins a form of state welfare aimed at assuring that poor children are fed and taken care of. He has a specific vision of the Empire, which reaches its maximum extent under his rule, and keeps a close watch on finances. Taxes, without any increase, are sufficient during his reign to pay the considerable costs of the budget. The informers used by Domitian to support his tyranny are expelled from Rome. In order to maintain the Port of Alexandria, Trajan reopens the canal between the Nile and the Red Sea.
- Trajan elevates Ladenburg to city status (civitas).

=== By topic ===
==== Arts and sciences ====
- Tacitus finishes his Germania (approximate date).

==== Commerce ====
- The silver content of the Roman denarius rises to 93 percent under emperor Trajan, up from 92 percent under Domitian.

== Deaths ==
- January 27 – Nerva, Roman emperor (b. AD 30)
- Casperius Aelianus, Roman praetorian prefect (b. AD 14)
