= Sermon on Indulgences and Grace =

1518 pamphlet by Martin Luther

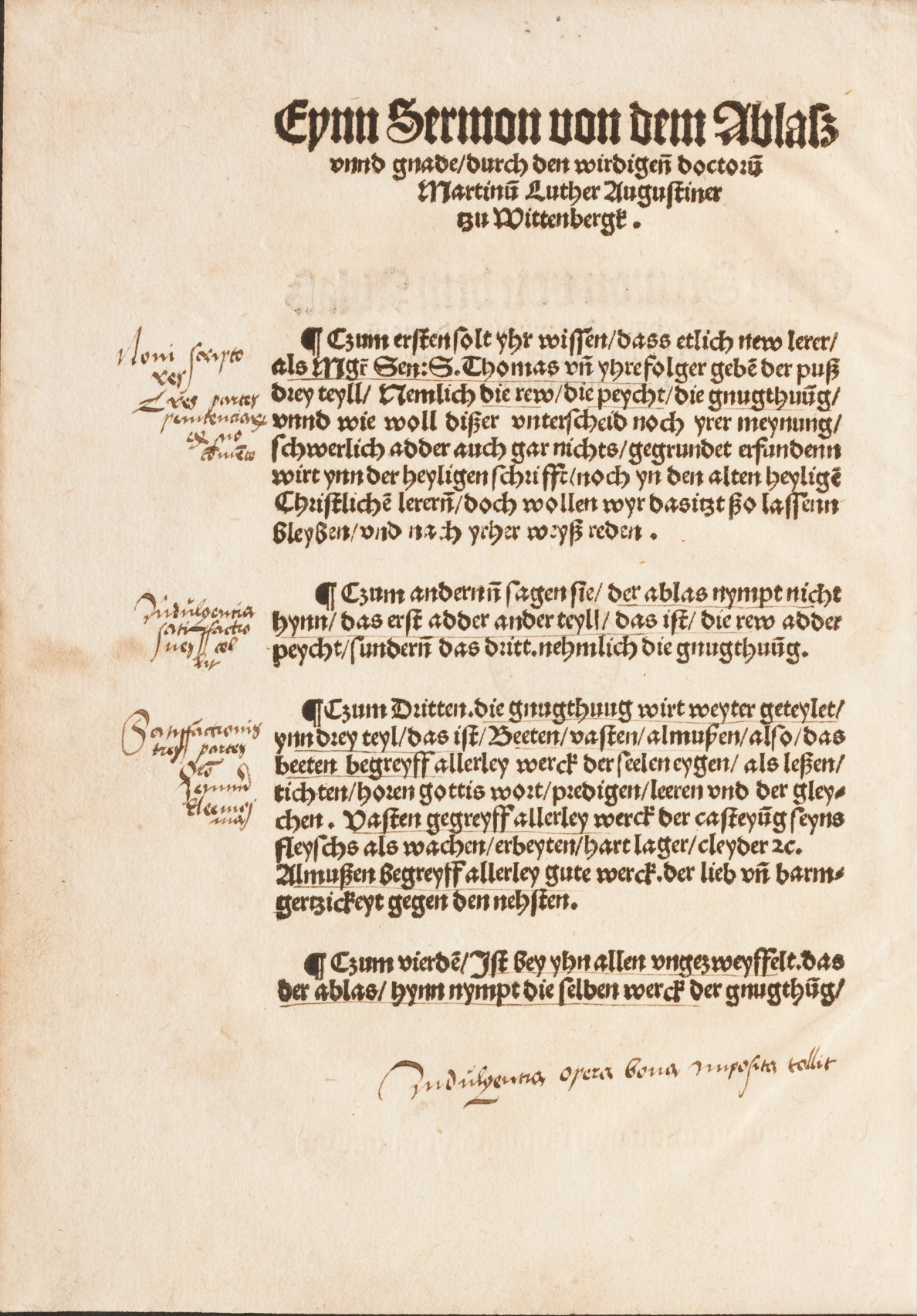
Wittenberg printing of the Sermon

Martin Luther's Sermon on Indulgences and Grace (German: Eynn Sermon von dem Ablasz und Gnade) is a pamphlet written in Wittenberg in the latter part of March, 1518 and published in April of that year.

The sermon itself was written as Luther directly addressing his audience. It stresses good works and sincere repentance over indulgences, with Luther criticizing indulgences as non-scriptural and the Catholic clergy as being greedy and wasting money on St. Peter's Basilica when it could be better spent on the poor in their own neighbourhoods.

== Impact ==
The pamphlet was an instant hit and was reprinted 14 times in 1518 alone, in print runs of at least 1,000 copies. It is regarded by many as the true starting point of the Reformation. Luther wrote the sermon in German, unlike his 95 Theses (written in Latin), and avoided regional vocabulary to ensure that his words were intelligible across all Germanic lands. This helped the work quickly reach a wide audience.

The sermon swept through the major centres of the Holy Roman Empire, and the broader reading public first came to know something of Luther through it. It has been described as "the world's first printed bestseller".

Wolfgang Capito thought highly of Luther's sermon.

The sermon was countered by Johann Tetzel in his Vorlegung (Presentation) condemning twenty errors of Luther.
