= Economy of Salvation =

Christian religious concept

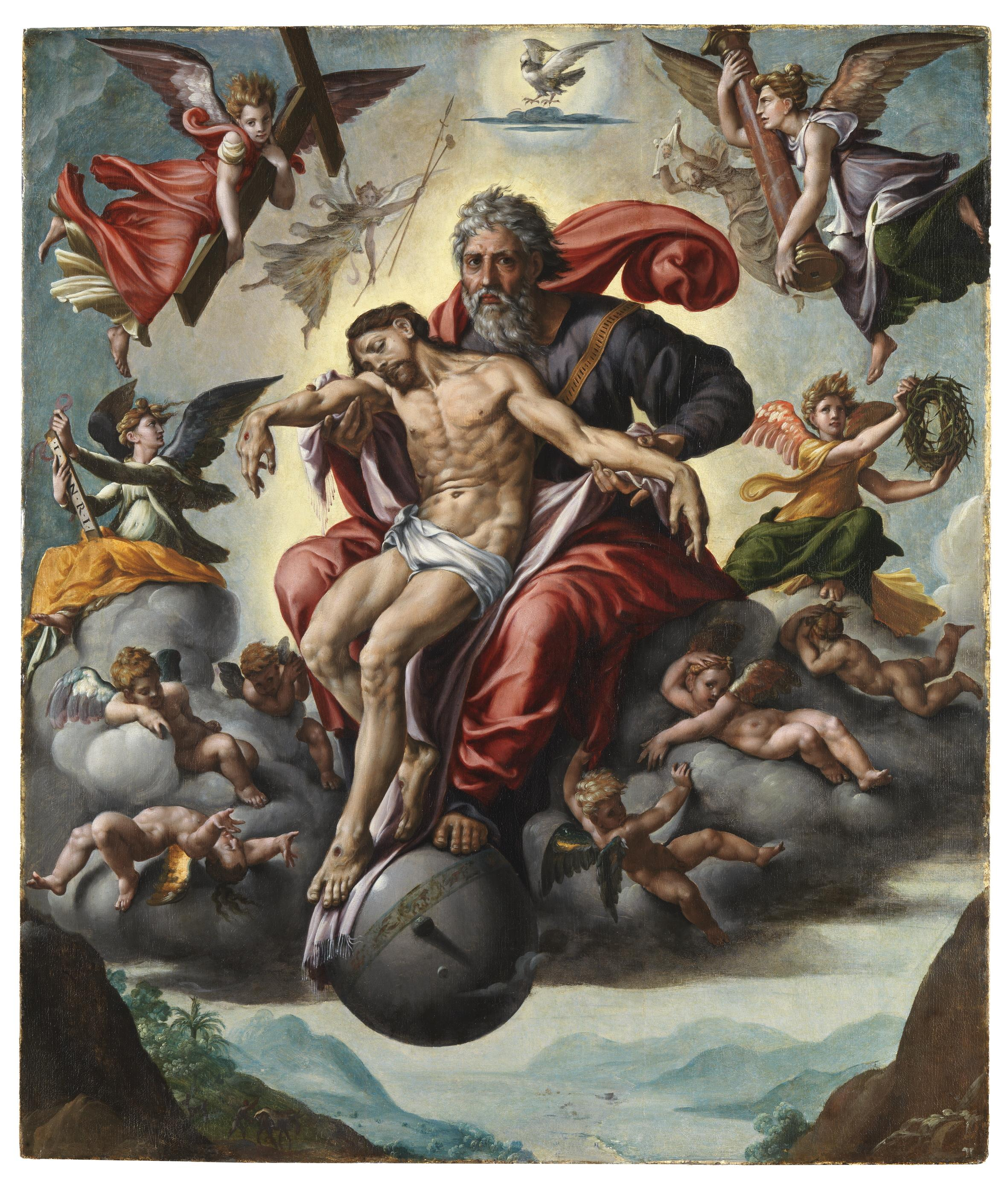
Holy Trinity, Jan Cornelisz Vermeyen, 16th century

The Economy of Salvation, also called the Divine Economy, is that part of divine revelation in the Roman Catholic tradition that deals with God's creation and management of the world, particularly his plan of salvation accomplished through the Church. Economy comes from the Greek oikonomia (economy), literally, "management of a household" or "stewardship".

Church doctrine sees this as the elements and resources revealed by God as necessary for the sake of mankind's salvation through God's revelation and communication of himself to mankind. It refers to God's creation of all things, and of his governance of the world, especially with regard to Jesus' part in salvation, which includes his mission being fulfilled by his body, the Church, and through the sacraments.

Paragraph 1103 of the Catechism of the Catholic Church also refers to the "Economy of Salvation" as the "economy of Revelation".

The term "Economy of Salvation" is first used by Origen of Alexandria, although references to the "Divine Economy", the "Economy of God" or simply the "Economy" are in earlier Church fathers.

Giorgio Agamben's The Kingdom and the Glory: For a Theological Genealogy of Economy and Government (2007; Eng. translation, 2011, p. 51) argues that this concept of "economy" (oikonomia) becomes narrowed to refer to a divine plan of salvation only after the Nicene dogma is established. In early Church history, the term also encompasses the "organization of the divine life" (51).

== See also ==
- Treasury of merit
