= Shivalila =

American commune in California

Shivalila was a commune founded in Bakersfield, California, in the 1970s by Gridley Lorimer Wright IV (1934-1979). They believed if a child was not dependent on just its mother (who could have a dysfunctional psychological disorder), but instead had a healthy relationship with many mothers, a more secure mode of attachment would be created, which would birth a new consciousness model for humanity...this information is from the 'Book of the Mother' The New York Sun describes them as a "nomadic cult of acid-taking, baby-worshiping hippies looking for the perfect place to bring up children.

The Shivalila at one point became part of another commune, the Black Bear Ranch until they were told to leave.
