= Black Bear Ranch =

US intentional community

- Intentional community
- Location map of Black Bear Ranch, United States
- Coordinates: 41.24184°N 123.17721°W
- Country: United States
- State: California
- Region: Shasta Cascade
- Established: 1968

Government
  - Type: Land trust
  - Founder: Richard Marley

Area
  - Urban: 0 sq mi (0 km^{2})
  - Metro: 0 sq mi (0 km^{2})

Population (2013)
  - Intentional community: 40
  - Urban: 0
  - Urban density: 0/sq mi (0/km^{2})
- Time zone: UTC-8 (Pacific Time Zone)
  - Summer (DST): UTC-7 (Pacific Daylight Time)
- Website: www.blackbearranch.org

Black Bear Ranch is an 80-acre intentional community located in Siskiyou County, California, about 25 miles from Forks of Salmon. It was founded in 1968, with the watchword "free land for free people". It has been considered by some participants and commentators to be one of the more radical examples of communal living/intentional communities that grew out of the counterculture of the 1960s.

Before being converted into a commune, it was a ghost town that had been a gold mining settlement in the 1860s. The commune's legal ownership was held by one resident, Richard Marley, until in 1987 it was transferred to the Black Bear Family Trust, which limits development of the property and established trustees to oversee various specified duties. Black Bear Ranch was the subject of the 2005 documentary Commune by Jonathan Berman. The commune still exists today and continues to follow the basic ideals which motivated its founding. At the Summer Solstice Gathering in 2013, there were over 40 residents, the highest population in decades. It is located in a steep pocket valley in the Siskiyou Mountains.

== Early life ==
According to the historian Timothy Miller, the community bought the property for $22,500 using money from a variety of sources including from supporters in the entertainment industry, as well as "one large unexpected angelic gift" and the "proceeds from a major LSD deal". The money from the entertainment industry was obtained through what Stephen Holden in The New York Times describes as "emotional blackmail", quoting Michael Tierra:

You're making money off our lifestyle. It's time you gave back some to us.

Although they struggled at first due to a lack of planning, the community at Black Bear Ranch learned to live self-sufficiently, as the ranch was often snowed in for extended periods during the winter months, and was many hours' drive from the nearest city. The residents managed to gather large quantities of food and medical supplies to see them through the winter and were able to treat a variety of illnesses and medical problems onsite, delivering babies and performing veterinary care. The community homeschooled their children, and maintained tools like chainsaws and cars without a need for mechanics. To raise money to pay for food and supplies, they found work fighting fires in the nearby forests.

Members of the commune were key organizers of Ent Forestry, a co-operative which took tree planting and forest rehabilitation contracts with the US Forest Service and Redwoods National Park, and provided income to the commune for several years.

Despite their remoteness, the community managed to keep in contact with a variety of radical groups including the Hells Angels and Black Power groups. There was a tension between those with a radical—even paramilitary—persuasion who wanted to pursue weapons training and possibly harbor radical political fugitives and the many pacifists. One of the founders of the commune, interviewed by the University of Kansas' 60s Commune Project and quoted in Miller:

we had a whole bunch of dependent people there, helpless, half of them reading comic books all day, waiting for someone to light the fire, who would rouse themselves when they smelled something cooking. So we founded the Black Bear Get-With-It Party, and we wrote a credo and went and nailed it up like Martin Luther on the door of the main house. It said, "We came up here to take over the world, to take over our own lives, and as a first step, we're announcing that we're going to take over Black Bear Ranch." It caused great consternation. Our tactic was to get up at the first light, have a bowl of porridge, and get to work and work all day—unheard of, right? Never mind smoking dope, you know—get to work.

Miller also records how "a strong sense of community" including ritual peyote use led to a variety of social experiments being conducted including the abolishing of private property and also the institution of a rule to prevent "coupling," which banned anyone from sleeping with the same partner for more than two consecutive nights, although this had disastrous consequences after a venereal disease spread amongst the community. Despite the ban on coupling (considered bourgeois decadence), traditional feelings of resentment came back when they tried to work out who had slept with whom in order to treat the disease:

We made up a chart with who slept with who, just go down and put a little "X" on it, and it turned out that I think we had to treat everybody. But the funny thing was, people would look at the chart and say "Joe, you bastard, you cheated on me with that bitch?" And I remember coming up and going, "Look at that son of a bitch Michael, he screwed everybody! And look at me, I got no marks next to my name!

At one point, a group called the Shivalila became part of the commune until they were forced to leave by the other members. The New York Sun describes them as a "nomadic cult of acid-taking, baby-worshiping hippies looking for the perfect place to bring up children" and they were led by a man called Gridley Wright.

Very few rules were ever adopted by the community. As Malcolm Terence notes: "Anarchists are good at lots of things but making rules isn’t one of them." After a hepatitis epidemic, they banned sitting on the kitchen counter, and they also banned turning the handle on the cream separator "because it used to drive people crazy when people would sit in the kitchen and play with the handle on the cream separator".

== Life today ==
Life at the ranch continues on, with similar struggles about what communal living means as took place during the early days. The rules have grown into a set of "Traditional Guidelines" which try to ensure "the continued existence of Black Bear Ranch and its tradition of communal living in a way that cares for and nourishes each other and the environment". Decision making by the group is managed through weekly 'Circles'.

In April 2017, the ranch made news when 15-year-old Tennessee student Elizabeth Thomas and her convicted kidnapper and former teacher Tad Cummins were found in a cabin in Cecilville, CA near the ranch after a month-long interstate manhunt. They had stayed for two weeks at Black Bear Ranch but were asked to leave, after which they moved into the cabin.

== See also ==
- Anti-globalization movement
- Beat Generation
- Cannabis culture
- Counterculture of the 1960s
- Food Not Bombs
- Freak scene
- Hippie
- Indomania
- Pacifism
- Sexual revolution
- Simple living
- Summer of Love
