= Pope Clement VI =

Head of the Catholic Church from 1342 to 1352

- Bishop of Rome
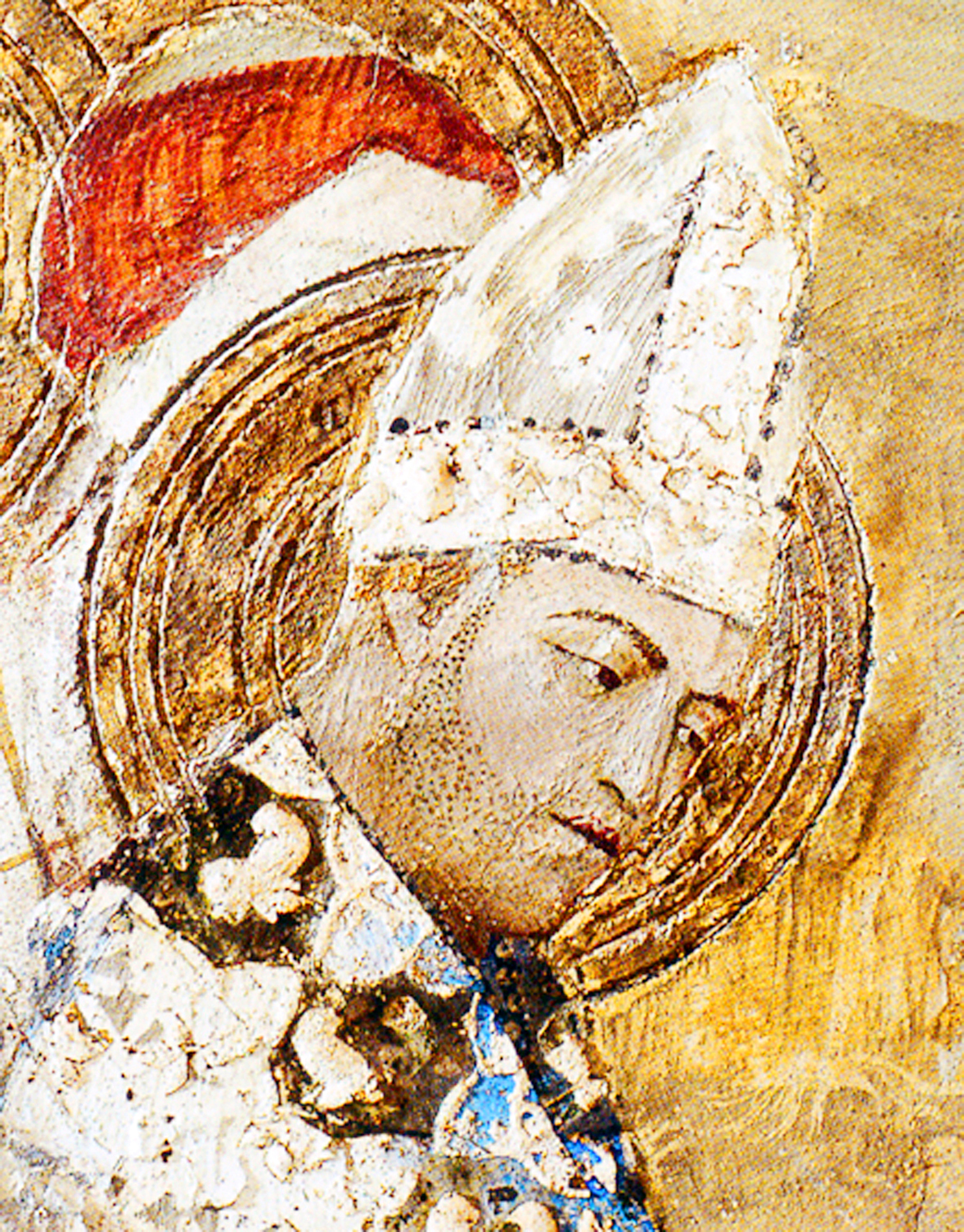
- Fresco in the Chapelle Saint-Martial of the Palais des Papes, 14th century
- Church: Catholic Church
- Papacy began: 7 May 1342
- Papacy ended: 6 December 1352
- Predecessor: Benedict XII
- Successor: Innocent VI

Orders
- Consecration: 1329
- Created cardinal: 18 December 1338 by Benedict XII

Personal details
- Born: Pierre Roger; 1291 Maumont, Rosiers-d'Égletons, Limousin, Kingdom of France
- Died: 6 December 1352 (aged 60–61) Avignon, Papal States
- Coat of arms

Papal styles of Pope Clement VI
- Reference style: His Holiness
- Spoken style: Your Holiness
- Religious style: Holy Father
- Posthumous style: None

Pope Clement VI (Latin: Clemens VI; 1291 – 6 December 1352), born Pierre Roger, was head of the Catholic Church from 7 May 1342 to his death, in December 1352. He was the fourth Avignon pope. Clement reigned during the first visitation of the Black Death (1348–1350), during which he granted remission of sins to all who died of the plague.

Roger steadfastly resisted temporal encroachments on the Church's ecclesiastical jurisdiction, and, as pope Clement VI, entrenched French dominance of the Church and opened its coffers to enhance the regal splendour of the Papacy. He recruited composers and music theorists for his court, including figures associated with the then-innovative Ars Nova style of France and the Low Countries.

== Early life ==
=== Birth and family ===
Pierre Roger (also spelled Rogier and Rosiers) was born in the château of Maumont, today part of the commune of Rosiers-d'Égletons, Corrèze, in Limousin, France, the son of the lord of Maumont-Rosiers-d'Égletons. He had an elder brother, Guillaume, who married three times and had thirteen children; and a younger brother, Hugues, who became Cardinal Priest of S. Lorenzo in Damaso and who could have become pope in 1362. Pierre also had two sisters: Delphine, who married Jacques de Besse; and Alienor, who married Jacques de la Jugie. His brother Guillaume became Seigneur de Chambon, thanks to his wife's dowry, and, with the benefit of his papal brother's influence on King Philip VI, became Vicomte de Beaufort.

=== Monk and scholar ===
Roger entered the Benedictine order as a boy in 1301, at the Abbey of La Chaise-Dieu in the diocese of Clermont in the Auvergne. After six years there, he was directed to higher studies by the Bishop of Le Puy, Jean de Cumenis, and his own abbot, Hugues d'Arc. In 1307 he took up studies in Paris at the College de Sorbonne, where he entered the Collège de Narbonne. To support him, beyond what was supplied by his bishop and his abbot, he was granted the post of Prior of St. Pantaléon in the diocese of Limoges. In the summer of 1323, after Pierre had been studying both theology and canon law in Paris for sixteen years, the Chancellor of Paris was ordered by Pope John XXII, on the recommendation of King Charles IV, to confer on him the doctorate in Theology, a chair, and a license to teach. Pierre was in his thirty-first year. He lectured publicly on the Sententiae of Peter Lombard, and defended and promoted the works of Thomas Aquinas. He was appalled by the Defensor Pacis of Marsilius of Padua, and wrote a treatise in 1325 condemning its principles and defending Pope John XXII.

He was granted the priory of St. Baudil, a dependency of the Abbey of La Chaise-Dieu, on 24 April 1324, at the personal order of Pope John XXII; and then, on 23 June 1326, he was named Abbot of Fécamp, a royal abbey and one of the most important monasteries in France. He held the position until 1329.

Pierre Roger was called to Avignon through the influence of his friend and protector, Cardinal Pierre de Mortemart (who was named a cardinal on 18 December 1327), both of whom were close to King Charles IV. Unfortunately, King Charles IV died on 1 February 1328, the last Capetian king of France in the direct line.

As Abbot of Fécamp, and therefore a feudal subject of Edward III, Pierre was assigned the task in 1328 of summoning Edward III of England to pay homage to Philip VI of France for the duchy of Aquitaine. He received no reply, however, from King Edward, and was forced to return to France, his mission unaccomplished.

== Episcopacy ==
On 3 December 1328 Peter Roger was named Bishop of Arras, in which capacity he became a royal councilor of King Philip VI. He held the diocese of Arras only until 24 November 1329, less than a year, when he was promoted to the Archdiocese of Sens. He held the Archbishopric of Sens for one year and one month, until his promotion to the See of Rouen on 14 December 1330.

In 1329, while Pierre Roger was still Archbishop-elect of Sens, a major assembly of the French Clergy was held at Vincennes in the presence of King Philip VI (1328–1350), to deal with issues involving the judicial powers of ecclesiastical authorities. Many propositions were put forward against ecclesiastical jurisdiction, which were ably argued by Pierre de Cugnières (Petrus de Cugneriis). Pierre Roger made the rejoinders on 22 December 1329, on behalf of the ecclesiastical authority.

When Pierre Roger became Archbishop of Rouen in December 1330, he was expected to swear allegiance to his feudal overlord. King Philip VI had recently given his son Jean the Dukedom of Normandy as an apanage, and Pierre was worried about what might happen if someone other than a member of the French royal family might become Duke of Normandy. He therefore asked the King for time to consider his position, but the King was firm and seized the temporalities of the Archbishop. Pierre was forced to go to Paris, where an agreement was worked out that, should someone other than a member of the royal family become Duke, then the Archbishop would swear fealty directly to the King.

As Archbishop of Rouen, Roger was one of the Peers of France and he was a member of the embassy sent by King Philip to his son John, in 1333, to swear in their name to take the cross and serve in a crusade in the Holy Land. Later in the year, in Paris in the Prés des Clercs, the King received the cross personally from the hands of Archbishop Roger.

It is said that he was promoted to the office of Chancellor of France, though there is no documentary proof. The earliest claim that he was Chancellor is made by Alfonso Chacon (Ciaconius) (1530–1599).

In 1333, the issue of the beatific vision, which had been under discussion since a sermon of Pope John XXII in 1329, reached a serious stage. The French Royal Court had been hearing complaints from various quarters, and the King and Queen finally decided to seek competent advice. The Pope knew that the University of Paris was hostile to his ideas, and so he sent Gerard Odonis, the Minister General of the Franciscans, and a Dominican preacher, to Paris to preach the Pope's views in public. King Philip responded to the general indignation by summoning the Masters of Theology of the University to Vincennes just before Christmas 1334, where it appeared that there was general agreement against the Pope. The King privately informed the Pope of their opinions, but the Pope harshly responded to the King that he should stop favoring an opinion which the Pope had not yet definitively settled. The Pope ordered the Archbishop of Rouen, Pierre Roger, to set the Pope's view down in writing and explain it to the King. Ironically, Pierre Roger was not on the Pope's side of the argument. A committee, which included Archbishop Roger, the theologian Pierre de la Palud (Petrus Paludensis), the Chancellor of France Guillaume de Sainte-Maure, the Archdeacon of Rouen Jean de Polenciac, and others, attempted to talk the Pope out of his notions. Early in 1334 Pope John XXII informed the King that he had ordered the Cardinals and prelates and Doctors of theology and of Canon Law at the Papal Court to look into the propositions thoroughly and report to him their findings. John XXII was attempting to save face by placing the matter in the hands of a committee, but in the end, on his deathbed, he was compelled to repudiate his opinions, which were formally condemned by his successor, Benedict XII.

On 14 April 1335, Pierre Roger's friend and patron, Cardinal Pierre de Mortemart died, naming Pierre Roger as one of the executors of his Testament.

In September 1335 Archbishop Roger held a provincial council at Rouen in the Priory of Nôtre-Dame-du Pré (later called Bonne-nouvelle). Two of his bishops were present, the other four were represented by procurators. The cathedral chapters of the province and the abbots of monasteries were invited as well. The council issued a dozen canons, urging the lower clergy to be diligent in their assigned duties. The most notable item was the encouragement given to bishops to facilitate the business of those who wished to join the King on crusade.

=== Cardinalate ===
Pierre Roger was created a Cardinal Priest by Pope Benedict XII (1334–1342) on 18 December 1338, in his only Consistory for the creation of cardinals. He created six new cardinals: four were fellow monks (two Benedictines, a Cistercian, and a Mercedarian); one was from Rimini, the rest from southern France. Four were lawyers, two were theologians. One died before he received the red hat, and was replaced by another candidate. Pierre Roger entered the Curia in Avignon for the first time on 5 May 1339, and received the titulus of Santi Nereo e Achilleo.

== Papacy ==
Cardinal Napoleone Orsini died during Lent of 1342, on 23 March. The funeral took place on Monday in Holy Week in the Franciscan church in Avignon, and the funeral sermon was preached by Cardinal Pierre Roger. A month later, on 25 April 1342, Pope Benedict XII died in the Papal Palace in Avignon. King Philip VI immediately sent his eldest son, Prince John, to press the candidacy of Pierre Roger, but he arrived too late to have any effect. Eighteen of the nineteen cardinals assembled for the Conclave to elect his successor. Fourteen were French, three were Italian, one was Spanish. Only Cardinal Bertrand de Montfavez, who was ill with podagra (gout), was unable to attend. The Conclave began on Sunday, 5 May 1342, and on the morning of Tuesday, 7 May, agreement was reached. Two cardinals wrote to King Edward III of England on 8 May that the election had been accomplished "with no preliminary politicking and with only Divine Inspiration." Cardinal Pierre Roger was chosen to succeed Benedict XII as pope. He was crowned on Pentecost Sunday, 19 May, in the church of the Dominicans, the largest church in Avignon. Present were Prince John of France, Duke of Normandy; Jacques, Duke of Burgundy, Imbert, Dauphin of Vienne, and many others. Cardinal Roger chose the regnal name Clement VI.

During the season of Pentecost immediately following his coronation, as Peter de Herenthal writes, when a new Pope customarily gratifies the expectations of his family, his followers, his supporters, his cardinals, and the Roman Curia, Pope Clement promised gifts to every cleric who presented himself at Avignon within two months. Such a multitude of poor clerics appeared in Avignon that a computation was made that the number of poor clerics in all the dioceses of the world was around 100,000, a number which Peter de Herenthal was quite prepared to accept. When Clement VI, at the very beginning of his pontificate was making reservations of abbacies and prelatures, and declaring elections in monasteries and Chapters void, in order to acquire benefices for papal use in granting favors, it was intimated to him that his predecessors had not engaged in reservations of such a sort. Clement is said to have replied, "Our predecessors did not know how to be pope."

=== New cardinals ===
One of the greatest ways in which a pope can reward his supporters is to raise them to the cardinalate. On 20 September 1342, four months after his coronation, Clement VI held a Consistory for the creation of cardinals. He appointed ten prelates, including three nephews, Hugues Roger, Ademar Roberti and Bernard de la Tour d'Auvergne. He also elevated Guy of Boulogne, the archbishop of Lyon and son of Count Robert VII of Auvergne, and Gerard de Daumar, the master-general of the Dominicans and a papal cousin, who died a year after his creation, on 27 September 1343. Five of his appointments were from his own native area of Limoges and one from Périgueux. Only one was Italian, Andrea Ghini Malpighi, a Florentine, who died on 2 June 1343. The College of Cardinals was now thoroughly French, with a strong accent of the Auvergne.

On 19 May 1344 the two new cardinals who had died were replaced by two more Frenchmen: the Provençal Pierre Bertrand, the nephew of Cardinal Pierre Bertrand; and Nicolas de Besse, yet another papal nephew.

Like his immediate predecessors, Clement was devoted to France, and he demonstrated his French sympathies by refusing a solemn invitation to return to Rome from the city's people, as well as from the poet Petrarch. To placate the Romans, however, Clement VI issued the bull Unigenitus (1343) on 27 January 1343, reducing the interval between one Great Jubilee and the next from 100 years to 50 years. In the document he elaborated for the first time the power of the pope in the use of indulgences. This document would later be used by Cardinal Cajetan in the examination of Martin Luther and his 95 Theses in his trial at Augsburg in 1518. By then, Unigenitus was firmly fixed in Canon Law, having been added in the collection called Extravagantes.

On 23 February 1343 Pope Clement appointed Pons Saturninus as his "Provisor of Works of the Palace", thereby beginning a program of construction and decoration that continued throughout his reign. It was immediately clear that the Pope had no intention of returning to Rome, and that he intended to provide offices and quarters for the various organs of the Roman Curia in the Palace. Pope Benedict XII, his predecessor, had built a palace, sufficiently accommodating for a Cistercian monk, but Pierre Roger had spent much of his career at the French Court and had imbibed its tastes for far greater display and ceremony. The Pope was, after all, a sovereign, and Clement intended to live and work in an appropriate state. He commissioned the new Tower of the Garde-Robe, the Audience (for the Auditors of the Rota), the new Papal Chapel and the grand staircase that led to it, and the Tour de la Gache (where the Audientia contradictarum, the appellate court for countersuits, had its offices). He was also responsible for the two new entrance façades.

He also purchased the sovereignty of Avignon from Queen Joan I of Naples in 1348 for the sum of 80,000 crowns.

=== The Black Death ===
Clement VI was on the papal throne when the Black Death first struck Europe in 1347. This pandemic swept through Asia and the Middle East and into Europe between 1347 and 1350, and is believed to have killed between a third and two-thirds of Europe's population. During the plague, Clement attributed the plague to divine wrath. But he also sought the opinions of astrologers for an explanation. Johannes de Muris was among the team "of three who drew up a treatise explaining the plague of 1348 by the conjunction of Saturn, Jupiter, and Mars in 1341" Clement VI's physicians advised him that surrounding himself with torches would block the plague. However, he soon became skeptical of this recommendation and stayed in Avignon supervising sick care, burials, and the pastoral care of the dying. He never contracted the disease, even though there was so much death around him that the cities ran out of ground for cemeteries, and he had to consecrate the entire Rhône River so that it could be considered holy ground and bodies could be thrown into it. Due to so many dying without access to priests, he granted a remission of sins to all who died of the plague. One of Pope Clement's physicians, Gui de Chauliac, later wrote a book called the Chirurgia magna (1363), in which he correctly distinguished between bubonic and pneumonic plague, based on his own observations of his patients and himself.

Perhaps feeling the pressure of mortality, having lost no fewer than six cardinals in the year 1348 alone, Pope Clement VI named a new cardinal on 29 May 1348, his nephew and namesake, Pierre Roger de Beaufort, who was not yet eighteen years old. On 17 December 1350, he added twelve more cardinals, nine of them French and only three from Limoges, including two relatives, Guillaume d'Aigrefeuille and Pierre de Cros.

Suspicion fell on the Jews for the plague, and pogroms erupted around Europe. Clement issued two papal bulls in 1348 (6 July and 26 September), the latter named Quamvis Perfidiam, which condemned the violence and said those who blamed the plague on the Jews had been "seduced by that liar, the Devil." He went on to emphasise that "It cannot be true that the Jews, by such a heinous crime, are the cause or occasion of the plague, because through many parts of the world the same plague, by the hidden judgment of God, has afflicted and afflicts the Jews themselves and many other races who have never lived alongside them." He urged clergy to take action to protect Jews as he had done.

=== Pope and Empire ===
Clement continued the struggle of his predecessors with Holy Roman Emperor Louis IV. On 13 April 1346, after protracted negotiations, he excommunicated the Emperor, and directed the election of Charles IV. After the death of Louis in October 1347 Charles received general recognition, ending the schism which had long divided Germany.

In response to increasing Turkish piracy in the Aegean, Clement proclaimed a crusade with the objective to recapture Smyrna which had been taken by the Aydinids in 1317. The crusaders were able to capture Smyrna on 28 October 1344 which was held by Latin Christians until 1402. He also had a role in the Hungarian invasion of the Kingdom of Naples, which was a papal fief; the contest between Louis I of Hungary and Joanna I of Naples, accused of ordering the assassination of her husband and the former's brother, concluded in 1348 in a trial held in Avignon, at which she was acquitted. Among the other benefits, Clement took advantage of the situation to obtain by her the rights over the city of Avignon.

Pope Clement was also involved in disputes with King Edward III of England as a result of the latter's encroachments on ecclesiastical jurisdiction. He also faced problems with the kings of Castile and Aragon. His negotiations for reunion with the Armenians and the Byzantine emperor, John VI Kantakouzenos, turned out to be fruitless.

In Italy the Papacy faced a serious challenge to its authority with the commencement of Cola di Rienzo's agitation in Rome. Pope Clement had appointed Cola to a civil position (Senator) at Rome, and, although at first approving of Rienzo's establishment of the tribunate, he later realized the implications of a permanent antagonist to papal government in the form of a popularly elected Tribune, and sent a Papal Legate who excommunicated Rienzo and, with the help of the aristocratic faction, drove him from the city in December 1347.

=== Poland and Bohemia ===
Clement also had warned King Casimir III of Poland, who was already under an interdict laid against him by the bishop of Kraków and the Apostolic See, because he had oppressed the Church of Kraków with intolerable burdens and then harassed the clergy who observed the interdict, that he was attracting more severe penalties to himself. In 1345 Clement sent a nuncio to King Casimir and King John of Bohemia, soliciting them to make peace between themselves, and threatening that, if they rejected his pleas, he would anathematize them and bar them from the sacraments.

Responding to numerous complaints against the highhanded behavior of the archbishop of Mainz, Prague's metropolitan, Clement made Prague an archbishopric on 30 April 1344, and assigned the Bishopric of Olomouc as its suffragan. The archbishop of Prague acquired the right to crown the king of Bohemia.

=== Private life ===
Unlike the Cistercian Benedict XII, the Benedictine Clement VI was devoted to an openhanded and generous lifestyle, and the treasury which he inherited from his predecessor made that lifestyle possible. He claimed to have "lived as a sinner among sinners" in his own words. During his pontificate, he added a new chapel to the Papal Palace and dedicated it to St. Peter. He commissioned the artist Matteo Giovanetti of Viterbo to paint common hunting and fishing scenes on the walls of the existing papal chapels, and purchased enormous tapestries to decorate the stone walls. To bring good music to the celebrations, he recruited musicians from northern France, especially from Liège, who cultivated the Ars Nova style. He liked music so much that he kept composers and theorists close to him throughout his entire pontificate, Philippe de Vitry being among the more famous. The first two payments he made after his coronation were to musicians.

=== Death, burial, and monument ===
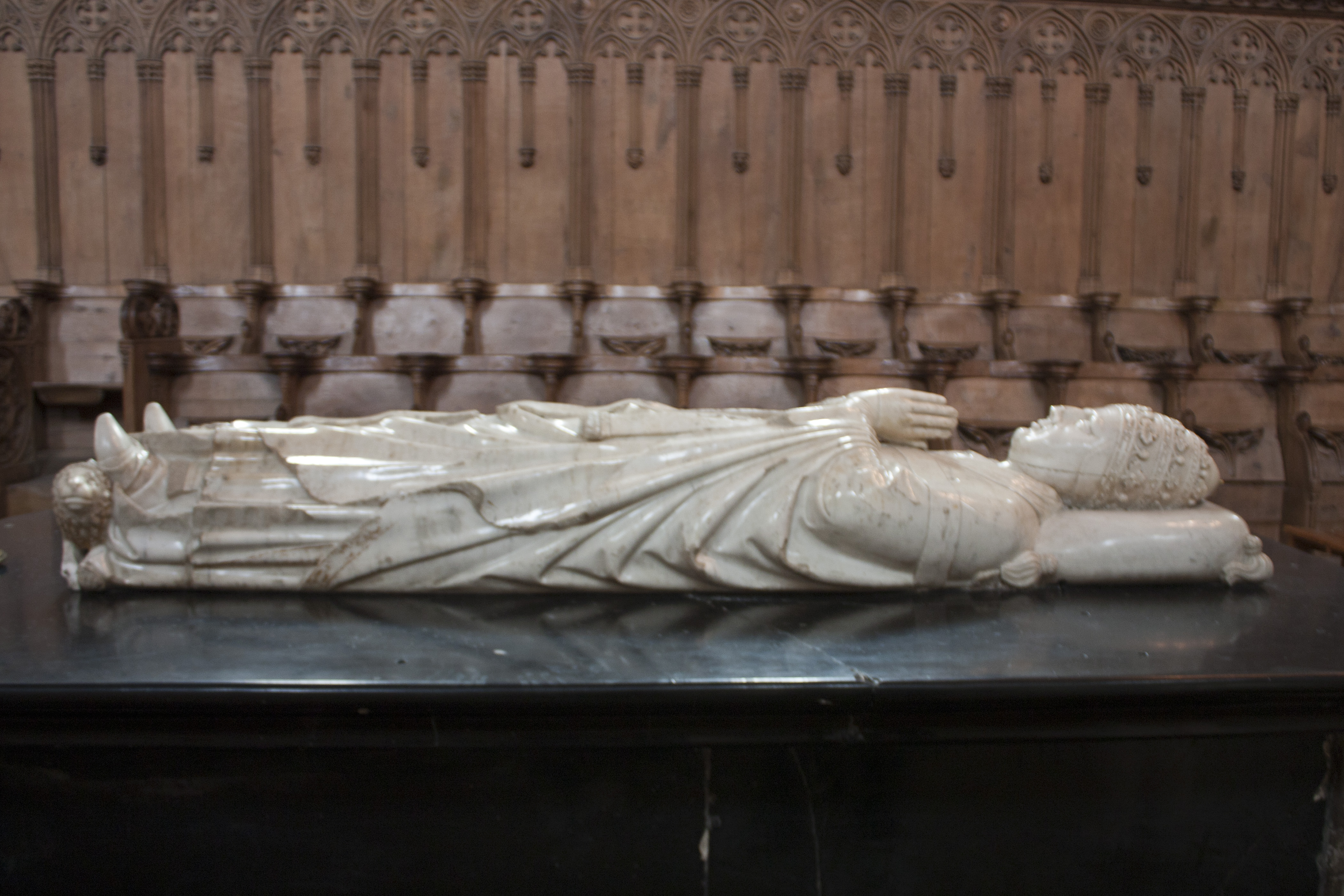
Tomb of Clement VI

Clement had been ill for some time in 1352, not just with kidney stones, which had troubled him for many years, but also with a tumor, which broke out into an abscess with fever during his last week. Pope Clement VI died on 6 December 1352, in the eleventh year of his reign. After his death, his Almoner, Pierre de Froideville, distributed the sum of 400 livres to the poor of Avignon, and on the day of the solemn funeral another 40 livres were distributed during the procession to the Cathedral to the poor who were present. Clement left the reputation of "a fine gentleman, a prince munificent to profusion, a patron of the arts and learning, but no saint". His body was placed on exhibit in the Notre Dame-des-Doms, where it was buried temporarily. Three months later, the body was transferred in a splendid procession to the abbey of La Chaise-Dieu, passing through Le Puy on 6 April. On arrival, the coffin was placed in the church of the Carmelites. Later in April it was permanently interred in a tomb in the center of the Choir of the Church. The funeral procession was accompanied by his brother Count William Roger of Beaufort, and by the five cardinals who were his family members: Hugues Roger, Guillaume de la Jugié, Nicolas de Besse, Pierre Roger de Beaufort, and Guillaume d'Aigrefeuille. In 1562, the tomb was attacked by the Huguenots and severely damaged, losing the forty-four statues of Clement's relatives which surrounded the sarcophagus. Only the sarcophagus and tomb cover survived, making the present tomb a mere shadow of its former architectural and decorative glory. The tomb cover, in white marble, was made by master sculptor Pierre Boye, and his two assistants Jean de Sanholis and Jean David. The construction of the tomb began in 1346, and was completed in 1351. It cost 3,500 florins, to which were added 120 écus d'or, as a gratuity for the master sculptor.

== See also ==
- List of popes
- Cardinals created by Clement VI
- Plague doctor
- Smyrniote crusades

Catholic Church titles
Preceded by Benedict XII	Pope; 1342 – 1352	Succeeded by Innocent VI
