= William Nolde =

United States Army officer (1929–1973)

Colonel William Benedict Nolde
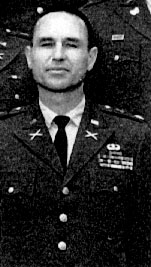
- William Nolde
- Born: August 8, 1929; Menominee, Michigan, US
- Died: January 27, 1973 (aged 43); An Lộc, Vietnam
- Burial place: Arlington National Cemetery
- Military career
- Allegiance: United States
- Branch: United States Army
- Rank: Colonel
- Conflicts: Korean War; Vietnam War †
- Awards: Legion of Merit; Bronze Star; Air Medal; Purple Heart; Vietnam Campaign Medal; Vietnam Service Medal

Colonel William Benedict Nolde (August 8, 1929 – January 27, 1973) was an officer in the United States Army. Born in Menominee, Michigan, Nolde was a professor of military science at Central Michigan University before joining the army. He is known for being the last official American combat casualty of the Vietnam War: the 45,914th confirmed death and 57,597th in the total list of Americans killed during the conflict. Nolde was killed by artillery fire eleven hours before the cessation of all hostilities in accordance with the Paris Peace Accords.

== Military career ==
Nolde was drafted into the U.S. Army and served in the Korean War. In 1970 he was the Battalion Commander, 5th BN, 30th Field Artillery, a Sergeant Missile Battalion deployed in northern Italy. After the war he stayed in the Army where he underwent officer training and served a first tour in South Vietnam in 1965. After returning from a posting in Italy in June 1972 he was asked by Army Chief of Staff William Westmoreland to return to South Vietnam as a military adviser to the Army of the Republic of Vietnam. Lt Col. Nolde became the senior military adviser in Bình Long Province. On 27 January 1973, eleven hours before the ceasefire under the Paris Peace Accords was to come into effect, Nolde was killed by North Vietnamese artillery fire near An Lộc.

While other Americans lost their lives after the truce was enacted, these were not recorded as combat casualties. During his time in the armed forces, he accumulated four medals, including the Bronze Star Medal and Legion of Merit. In 1997, Nolde was one of the first members inducted into the Central Michigan University Reserve Officer's Training Corps Hall of Fame. In 2006, Colonel Nolde was inducted into the Fort Sill Artillery Officer Candidate School Hall of Fame.

== Lecture Series ==
The William B. Nolde Lecture Series has the purpose to promote an understanding of the role of the United States Armed Forces in the life and history of the United States and to recognize the tie between military science and the broader disciplines within the university. The lectures serve as a stimulus to intellectual activity for future leaders both in the military and across the Central Michigan University campus and community. This program is sponsored by the university's Military Science Department. The following are the lectures presented:

William B. Nolde Lectures
| Date | Lecturer | Organization | Topic |
|---|---|---|---|
| Fall 1998 | Dr. Jerold Brown | Historian, Combat Studies Institute, Ft. Leavenworth | The Citizen-Soldier and the American Military Tradition |
| Spring 1999 | Hon. Dave Camp | US Representative, Michigan 4th Congressional District | The Role of Congress in Raising and Supporting the US Armed Forces |
| Fall 1999 | Dr. Gregory M.A. Gronbacher | Director, Center for Economic Personalism, Action Institute | The Just War Tradition: Will it Survive the 21st Century |
| Spring 2000 | Col. Edwin F. Veiga | Director of Media Relations, Office of Chief of Army Public Affairs | Media and the Military: Meeting the Challenge |
| Fall 2000 | Maj. Gen. E. Gordon Stump | Adjutant General, State of Michigan | The Role of the Michigan National Guard |
| Spring 2001 | Col. James M. McDonald | Office of the Deputy Chief of Staff, US Army | US Army Transition |
| Fall 2001 | Dr. Hans A. Andrews | President, Olney Central College | Leadership Education |
| Spring 2002 | Col. Genaro J. Dellarocco | Project Manager, Force Projections Combat Services Support, TACOM | Force Projection: The Spear of our Nation's Military Power Projection |
| Fall 2002 | Pres. Michael Rao, | Central Michigan University (with Dani Hiar, Jamie Brown, Jennifer Ireland, Michelle Howard, Nathan Westfall, and Nicole Wright) | CMU Student Leader Development: Preparing Leaders for our University, Community, Nation, and World |
| Spring 2003 | Brig. Gen. John G. Kulhavi and Terence F. Moore | Senior Vice President, Merrill Lynch and President/CEO, Mid-Michigan Health | Leadership in the Military and the Business World |
| Fall 2003 | Brig. Gen. Roger L. Allen | Deputy STARC Commander, Michigan Army National Guard | Building Leaders for Tomorrow |
| Fall 2004 | Capt. Shawn Abbe | Commander, 1437th Multi-Role Bridge Company | Leadership in Times of Conflict |
| Spring 2005 | Brig. Gen. Anne F. McDonald | Deputy Director for Operations, National Military Command Center | Gold Nuggets I Wish I had Known |
| Fall 2005 | Col. R. John Cully | Vice President, Trading Places International | Eastern Region Government and Armed Forces Cooperative |
| Spring 2006 | Lt. Col. Gary Brito | Commander, 1st Battalion, 15th Regiment (Mechanized), 3rd Infantry Division | Students should not be afraid to take risks |
| Fall 2006 | Col. James P. Coates | Commander. 9th Brigade, Western Region, US Army Cadet Command | OPEN DISCUSSIONS with Question and Answer |
| Fall 2007 | Lt. Col. Brian Mays | Assistant Principal, Colin Powell Middle School | OPEN DISCUSSIONS with Question and Answer |
| Spring 2008 | Col. Thomas Rini | Investigator, Office of the Inspector General, DoD | OPEN DISCUSSIONS with Question and Answer |
| Fall 2008 | Lt. Col. David A. Burdette | Vice President, Central Michigan University | Student, Citizen, and Soldier in the 21st Century |
| Spring 2009 | Col. Scott S. Haraburda | Director, Manufacturing & Engineering, Crane Army Ammunition Activity | Success by Surviving Changes |
| Fall 2009 | Lt. Col. Brian Eifler | Commander, Special Troops Battalion, 75th Ranger Regiment | Reflections of a CMU Ranger |
| Spring 2010 | Col. Elaine A. Edwards | Director of Marketing, US Army Cadet Command | OPEN DISCUSSIONS with Question and Answer |
| Fall 2010 | Michael Knapp | US Army National Guard Intelligence Center, Charlottesville, VA | Briefing on Islamic Extremism |
| Spring 2011 | COL Rick Nussio | Center for Strategic & International Studies, U.S. Army Service College | Plates and People: Educating Leaders for an Uncertain Future |
| Fall 2011 | BG(R) Mark Montjar | VSE Corporation | Leadership: Teamwork and Collaboration |
| Spring 2012 | MAJ(R) InSung Oaks Lee | Homeland Security | Army Core Value - Personal Courage |
| Fall 2012 | Captain Tim Hardy | Sunoco, Inc. | Leadership and Character |
| Spring 2013 | BG(R) John Leatherman | Michigan Army National Guard | You Will Receive More Than A Commission |
| Fall 2013 | CPT(R) William Talcott | | Effective Leadership |
| Spring 2014 | COL(R) John Hinck | | Being Smart is Your Best Weapon |
| Spring 2015 | Terence Moore | MidMichigan Health | The Value of ROTC in the Civilian World |

== Nolde Scholarship ==
At Central Michigan University, the William B. Nolde Scholarship was established in memory of Colonel William B. Nolde by students, family and friends.

== Burial ==
Nolde was buried on February 5, 1973 in Section 3 of Arlington National Cemetery (his widow Joyce was buried beside him in 2005). As the last official combat casualty, his funeral was broadcast on television and was attended by "considerably more brass than the funeral of a field-grade officer would normally command" including General Alexander Haig and President Richard Nixon.

== Awards and decorations ==
- Legion of Merit
- Bronze Star
- Purple Heart
- Air Medal
- Vietnam Service Medal
- Vietnam Campaign Medal
