= 2024 in public domain =

When a work's copyright expires, it enters the public domain. The following is a list of creators whose works entered the public domain in 2024. Since laws vary globally, the copyright status of some works are not uniform.

== Countries with life + 70 years ==
With the exception of Belarus (Life + 50 years) and Spain (which has a copyright term of Life + 80 years for creators that died before 1987), a work enters the public domain in Europe 70 years after the creator's death, if it was published during the creator's lifetime. For previously unpublished material, those who publish it first will have the publication rights for 25 years.

Names	Country	Death	Occupation	Notable work
Hans Aanrud	Norway	11 January 1953	Writer	
Tamar Abakelia	Georgia	14 May 1953	Sculptor	
Abdullah Yusuf Ali	India	10 December 1953	Translator	The Holy Qur'an: Text, Translation and Commentary
Dimitri Arakishvili	Georgia	13 August 1953	Composer	The Legend of Shota Rustaveli
Agustín Abarca	Chile	28 May 1953	Painter	
Walter Armitage	South Africa	22 February 1953	Playwright	
Vladimir Bakaleinikov	Russia	5 November 1953	Composer, conductor	
Rudolf Bauer	Germany	28 November 1953	Painter	
Arnold Bax	United Kingdom	3 October 1953	Composer, writer	List of compositions by Arnold Bax
Harmsen van der Beek	The Netherlands	24 July 1953	Illustrator, commercial artist	Noddy
Hilaire Belloc	United Kingdom	16 July 1953	Writer	Hilaire Belloc bibliography
Róbert Berény	Hungary	10 September 1953	Painter	Sleeping Lady with Black Vase
Henri Bernstein	France	27 November 1953	Playwright	Samson, Mélo
Elsa Beskow	Sweden	30 June 1953	Writer, illustrator	
Ugo Betti	Italy	9 June 1953	Playwright, judge	The Fugitive
Henrik Bull	Norway	2 June 1953	Architect	National Theatre
Ivan Bunin	Russia	9 June 1953	Writer	List of short stories by Ivan Bunin, List of poems by Ivan Bunin
John Horne Burns	United States	11 August 1953	Writer	The Gallery
Rosario Candela	United States	3 October 1953	Architect	740 Park Avenue
Harold Cazneaux	Australia	19 June 1953	Photographer	Cazneaux Tree
Ahmed Ghulam Ali Chagla	Pakistan	5 February 1953	Composer	"Qaumi Taranah"
Albert Coates	United Kingdom	11 December 1953	Composer, conductor	
Ruth Crawford Seeger	United States	18 November 1953	Composer	String Quartet 1931
Peter DeRose	United States	23 April 1953	Composer	"Deep Purple"
Raoul Dufy	France	23 March 1953	Painter	
Edmund Dulac	France	25 May 1953	Illustrator	
Jean Epstein	France	2 April 1953	Film director	The Fall of the House of Usher
Georges Le Faure	France	25 May 1953	Writer	
Emil Filla	Czech Republic	7 October 1953	Painter	
Konstanty Ildefons Gałczyński	Poland	6 December 1953	Poet	Skumbrie w tomacie
Albert Gleizes	France	23 June 1953	Painter, writer	List of works by Albert Gleizes
Milt Gross	United States	29 November 1953	Cartoonist	
Guccio Gucci	Italy	2 January 1953	Fashion designer	
Sophia Hayden	United States	3 February 1953	Architect	The Woman's Building
Mary Brewster Hazelton	United States	13 September 1953	Painter	
Jindřich Heisler	Czech Republic	4 January 1953	Photographer, writer and surrealist artist	
Cecil Hepworth	United Kingdom	9 February 1953	Film director, producer	Alice in Wonderland (1903 film)
Tatsuo Hori	Japan	28 May 1953	Writer	The Wind Has Risen
Curuppumullage Jinarajadasa	Sri Lanka	18 June 1953	Writer	Art as a factor in the soul's evolution
Joseph Jongen	Belgium	12 July 1953	Composer	Mass, Op. 130
Emmerich Kálmán	Hungary	30 October 1953	Composer	Die Csárdásfürstin, Countess Maritza, Die Zirkusprinzessin
Thiru. V. Kalyanasundaram	India	17 September 1953	Writer	
Fritz Kirchhoff	Germany	25 June 1953	Film director	Attack on Baku
Moïse Kisling	France	29 April 1953	Painter	
Eduard Künneke	Germany	27 October 1953	Composer	The Cousin from Nowhere
Elisabeth Kuyper	The Netherlands	26 February 1953	Composer	
Jorge de Lima	Brazil	15 November 1953	Politician, writer	
Will Longstaff	Australia	1 July 1953	Painter	Menin Gate at Midnight
Oskar Luts	Estonia	23 March 1953	Writer, playwright	
Kornel Makuszyński	Poland	31 July 1953	Writer	Koziołek Matołek
Herman J. Mankiewicz	United States	5 March 1953	Screenwriter	Citizen Kane
Emmanuel de Margerie	France	20 December 1953	Geographer	
John Marin	United States	2 October 1953	Painter	
Daniel Gregory Mason	United States	4 December 1953	Composer, music critic	
Erich Mendelsohn	Germany	15 September 1953	Architect	List of works by Erich Mendelsohn
Moses Milner	Russia	25 October 1953	Composer	
Mime Misu	Romania	25 October 1953	Dancer, film director	In Nacht und Eis, Das Mirakel
Vera Mukhina	Soviet Union	6 October 1953	Sculptor, painter	Worker and Kolkhoz Woman
Sulaiman Nadvi	Pakistan	22 November 1953	Writer	Khutbat-e-madras
Ibrahim Nagi	Egypt	6 October 1953	Poet	"Al-Atlal"
Francesco Saverio Nitti	Italy	20 February 1953	Politician	
Hisato Ohzawa	Japan	28 October 1953	Composer	Piano Concerto No. 3
Eugene O'Neill	United States	27 November 1953	Playwright	Long Day's Journey into Night
Francis Picabia	France	30 November 1953	Painter	List of works by Francis Picabia
Joseph Pinchon	France	20 June 1953	Illustrator	Bécassine
Uroš Predić	Serbia	12 February 1953	Painter	Happy Brothers
Alice Prin	France	30 November 1953	Model, painter, writer	Kiki's Memoirs
Sergei Prokofiev	Russia	5 March 1953	Composer, conductor	List of compositions by Sergei Prokofiev
Vsevolod Pudovkin	Russia	30 June 1953	Film director, screenwriter	
Roger Quilter	United Kingdom	21 September 1953	Composer	Arnold Book of Old Songs
Rachilde	France	4 April 1953	Writer	Monsieur Vénus
Graciliano Ramos	Brazil	20 March 1953	Writer, translator	Vidas secas
Marjorie Kinnan Rawlings	United States	14 December 1953	Author	The Yearling
Django Reinhardt	France	16 May 1953	Composer, musician	
Winold Reiss	United States	23 August 1953	Painter	Winold Reiss industrial murals
Pasquale Rizzoli	Italy	30 January 1953	Sculptor	
Ludomir Różycki	Poland	1 January 1953	Composer	
Max Sainsaulieu	France	21 February 1953	Architect	Carnegie Library of Reims
Rudolph Schindler	United States	22 August 1953	Architect	Schindler House
Edward Shanks	United Kingdom	4 May 1953	Writer	Fête Galante
Everett Shinn	United States	1 May 1953	Painter	
Joseph Stalin	Russia	5 March 1953	Politician	Economic Problems of Socialism in the USSR
Vladimir Tatlin	Russia	31 May 1953	Painter, architect	Tatlin's Tower
Neyzen Tevfik	Turkey	28 January 1953	Poet, satirist	
Jérôme Tharaud	France	28 January 1953	Writer	
Dylan Thomas	United Kingdom	9 November 1953	Poet	List of works by Dylan Thomas
Totius	South Africa	1 July 1953	Poet	
Julian Tuwim	Poland	27 December 1953	Poet	"Murzynek Bambo"
Jules Van Nuffel	Belgium	25 June 1953	Composer	In convertendo Dominus
Bernard Carra de Vaux	France	1953	Orientalist	
Vydūnas	Lithuania	20 February 1953	Poet	
Erich Weinert	Germany	20 April 1953	Writer	"Der Heimliche Aufmarsch"
Ben Ames Williams	United States	4 February 1953	Writer	The Unconquered
Hank Williams	United States	1 January 1953	Musician	List of songs written by Hank Williams
Arthur Wimperis	United Kingdom	14 October 1953	Lyricist, screenwriter	The Arcadians, Mrs. Miniver
Friedrich Wolf	Germany	5 October 1953	Writer	Professor Mamlock
Xu Beihong	China	26 September 1953	Painter	
Vsevolod Zaderatsky	Russia	1 February 1953	Composer	
John Stepan Zamecnik	United States	13 June 1953	Composer	

== Countries with life + 60 years ==
In Bangladesh, India and Venezuela, a work enters the public domain 60 years after the creator's death.

Names	Country	Death	Occupation	Notable work
Georges Braque	France	31 August 1963	Painter, sculptor	The Viaduct at L'Estaque
Babu Gulabrai	India	13 April 1963	Writer	
Nâzım Hikmet	Turkey	3 June 1963	Poet	Kız Çocuğu
Amar Nath Kak	India	1963	Writer	
Louis MacNeice	Ireland; UK	3 September 1963	Poet, playwright	Autumn Journal
Laudelino Mejías	Venezuela	30 November 1963	Composer	"Conticinio"
Enrique Pérez Arce	Mexico	25 June 1963	Politician, writer	La Tambora
Rajendra Prasad	India	28 February 1963	Politician, writer	
Hemendra Kumar Roy	India	18 April 1963	Writer	
Laxminarayan Sahu	India	18 January 1963	Writer	
Rahul Sankrityayan	India	14 April 1963	Activist, writer	Meri Jeevan Yatra
Anasuya Shankar	India	29 July 1963	Writer	
Acharya Shivpujan Sahay	India	21 January 1963	Writer	

== Countries with life + 50 years ==
In most countries of Africa and Asia, as well as Belarus, Bolivia and New Zealand, a work enters the public domain 50 years after the creator's death.

Names	Country	Death	Occupation	Notable work
Aziz Abaza	Egypt	11 July 1973	Poet, politician	
Zainal Abidin Ahmad	Malaysia	23 October 1973	Writer, linguist	
W. H. Auden	United Kingdom	29 September 1973	Poet	
Malek Bennabi	Algeria	31 October 1973	Philosopher	Les Conditions de la Renaissance
Charles Brasch	New Zealand	20 May 1973	Poet, editor	Landfall
Elizabeth Bowen	Ireland; United Kingdom	22 February 1973	Biologist	
Pearl S. Buck	United States	6 March 1973	Novelist	The Good Earth
Amílcar Cabral	Cape Verde; Guinea-Bissau	20 January 1973	Activist	Esta É a Nossa Pátria Bem Amada
Noël Coward	United Kingdom	26 March 1973	Playwright	Noël Coward on stage and screen
John Creasey	United Kingdom	9 June 1973	Writer	Gideon's Day
Jim Croce	United States	20 September 1973	Musician	
Bobby Darin	United States	20 December 1973	Musician	
Henry Darger	United States	13 April 1973	Novelist, artist	In the Realms of the Unreal
Dong Xiwen	China	8 January 1973	Painter	The Founding Ceremony of the Nation
Arthur Freed	United States	12 April 1973	Lyricist, film producer	Singin' in the Rain
John Ford	United States	4 August 1973	Director	John Ford filmography
Ragnar Frisch	Norway	31 January 1973	Economist	
Anthony Gilbert	Great Britain	9 December 1973	Writer	The Vanishing Corpse
Martti Haavio	Finland	4 February 1973	Poet, Folklorist, Mythologist	Karjalan jumalat, Bjarmien vallan kukoistus ja tuho
Elisabeth Hauptmann	Germany	20 April 1973	Playwright	The Threepenny Opera (with Bertolt Brecht)
Taha Hussein	Egypt	11 July 1973	Poet, politician	The Days
José Alfredo Jiménez	Mexico	23 November 1973	Songwriter	"El Rey"
Lyndon B. Johnson	United States	22 January 1973	Politician	
Raymonde de Kervern	Mauritius	1973	Poet	
Bruce Lee	United States	20 July 1973	Martial artist	Tao of Jeet Kune Do
Kathleen Lindsay	Great Britain	1973	Writer	
Gian Francesco Malipiero	Italy	1 August 1973	Composer, musicologist	L'Orfeide
Cornelia Meigs	United States	1973	Children's writer	The Windy Hill
Adolfo Mejía Navarro	Colombia	6 July 1973	Composer	"Pequeña Suite para Orquesta"
Nancy Mitford	Great Britain	30 June 1973	Writer	The Pursuit of Love
Timo K. Mukka	Finland	27 March 1973	Writer	Maa on syntinen laulu
Pablo Neruda	Chile	23 September 1973	Poet	Canto General, Oda al Gato
Robert C. O'Brien	United States	5 March 1973	Writer	Z for Zachariah
Kid Ory	United States	23 January 1973	Composer	Red Allen, Kid Ory & Jack Teagarden at Newport
Gram Parsons	United States	19 September 1973	Musician	
Isabel Peacocke	New Zealand	12 October 1973	Writer	Cathleen with a 'C'
Pablo Picasso	Spain	8 April 1973	Painter	Guernica, Les Demoiselles d'Avignon
Pixinguinha	Brazil	17 February 1973	Composer	
William Plomer	South Africa	20 September 1973	Writer	
Andy Razaf	United States	3 February 1973	Lyricist	Ain't Misbehavin'
Gopal Prasad Rimal	Nepal	24 October 1973	Poet	Jangi Nishan Hamro
Ivan T. Sanderson	United States	19 February 1973	Biologist	
Nigoghos Sarafian	France	1972	Poet	
Mohammed ash-Shanqîtî	Mauritania KSA	10 January 1973	Muslim scholar	Works
Allan Sherman	United States	20 November 1973	Comedian	"Hello Muddah, Hello Fadduh (A Letter from Camp)"
Ousmane Diop Socé	Senegal	27 October 1973	Poet	Contes et légendes d'Afrique noire
Abdillahi Suldaan Mohammed Timacade	Somalia	6 February 1973	Poet	
Bhim Nidhi Tiwari	Nepal	1973	Poet	Dagbatti
J. R. R. Tolkien	United Kingdom	2 September 1973	Writer	J. R. R. Tolkien bibliography
Valentin Tomberg	Russian Empire	24 February 1973	Mystic	Meditations on the Tarot
Âşık Veysel	Turkey	21 March 1973	Composer	
Alan Watts	United Kingdom	16 November 1973	Philosopher	Alan Watts bibliography
Chic Young	United States	14 March 1973	Cartoonist	Blondie

== Countries with life + 80 years ==
Spain has a copyright term of life + 80 years for creators that died before 1987. In Colombia and Equatorial Guinea a work enters the public domain 80 years after the creator's death.

Names	Country	Death	Occupation	Notable work
Carlos Arniches	Spain	16 April 1943	Playwright	
Carmen Karr	Spain	29 December 1943	Activist, composer	
Francisco Rodríguez Marín	Spain	9 June 1943	Poet	
José Jurado de la Parra	Spain	21 July 1943	Poet, playwright	
Guillermo Valencia	Colombia	8 July 1943	Poet, translator	

== Australia and Canada ==
In 2004 copyright in Australia changed from a "plus 50" law to a "plus 70" law, in line with the United States and the European Union. But the change was not made retroactive (unlike the 1995 change in the European Union which brought some e.g. British authors back into copyright, especially those who died from 1925 to 1944). Hence the work of an author who died before 1955 is normally in the public domain in Australia; but the copyright of authors was extended to 70 years after death for those who died in 1955 or later, and no more Australian authors would come out of copyright until 1 January 2026 (those who died in 1955).

Similarly, Canada amended its Copyright Act in 2022 from a "plus 50" law to a "plus 70" law, coming into force on December 30, 2022, but not reviving expired copyright. No more new authors will come out of copyright in Canada until 1 January 2043 (those who died in 1972). Crown copyright was not changed, thus works published in 1973 entered the public domain in 2024.

== United States ==
One of the most notable works which entered the public domain in 2024 is Walt Disney's animated short film Steamboat Willie, featuring the earliest incarnation of Mickey Mouse.

Under the Copyright Term Extension Act, books published in 1928, films released in 1928, and other works published in 1928, entered the public domain in 2024. Sound recordings that were published in 1923 and unpublished works whose authors died in 1953 also entered the public domain.

Public Domain Day 2024 attracted unparalleled media interest, primarily for marking the long-awaited arrival of Steamboat Willie, featuring the earliest incarnations of Mickey Mouse and Minnie Mouse, into the public domain. The short film's owner, The Walt Disney Company, had previously lobbied for the extension of copyright length in the United States in order to prevent the film and the character of Mickey from entering the public domain; the result of that lobby effort was the passage of the Copyright Term Extension Act in 1998. Additional works that were part of this year's wave of entrants to the American public domain included notable literature such as Lady Chatterley's Lover by D. H. Lawrence, Bertolt Brecht's play The Threepenny Opera in its original German, Orlando: A Biography by Virginia Woolf, Dark Princess by W. E. B. Du Bois, Home to Harlem by Claude McKay, The Well of Loneliness by Radclyffe Hall, and the children's books The House at Pooh Corner by A. A. Milne and Millions of Cats by Wanda Gág; notable films such as Buster Keaton's The Cameraman, the first all-talking full-length feature film Lights of New York, and Charlie Chaplin's The Circus; the musical Animal Crackers; notable popular songs such as Cole Porter's song "Let's Do It, Let's Fall in Love"; and sound recordings by such performers as Bessie Smith and Ida Cox.

J.M Barrie's play Peter Pan, or the Boy Who Won't Grow Up also entered the public domain in the United States in 2024.

Works from 1928 that were already public domain due to no renewal or no notice are the first appearances of radio characters Amos 'n' Andy (albeit only the scripts as ruled in 1989 court case Silverman v. CBS Inc), H.P. Lovecraft's The Call of Cthulhu, and the film Steamboat Bill, Jr.

== Worldwide ==
On May 28, 2024, American ballet choreographer Eliot Feld announced he will donate all his 149 ballets to the public domain.

On March 13, 2024, The J. Paul Getty Museum announced that it will release 88 thousand images into the public domain.

== See also ==
- List of American films of 1928
- 1953 in literature and 1973 in literature for deaths of writers
- Public Domain Day
- Creative Commons
