= 2034 in public domain =

When a work's copyright expires, it enters the public domain. Since laws vary globally, the copyright status of some works are not uniform. The following is a list of creators whose works enter the public domain in 2034 under the most common copyright regimes, assuming no further extensions to copyright terms become law in the interim.

== Countries with life + 70 years ==
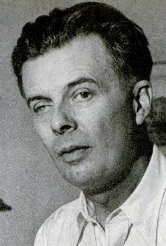
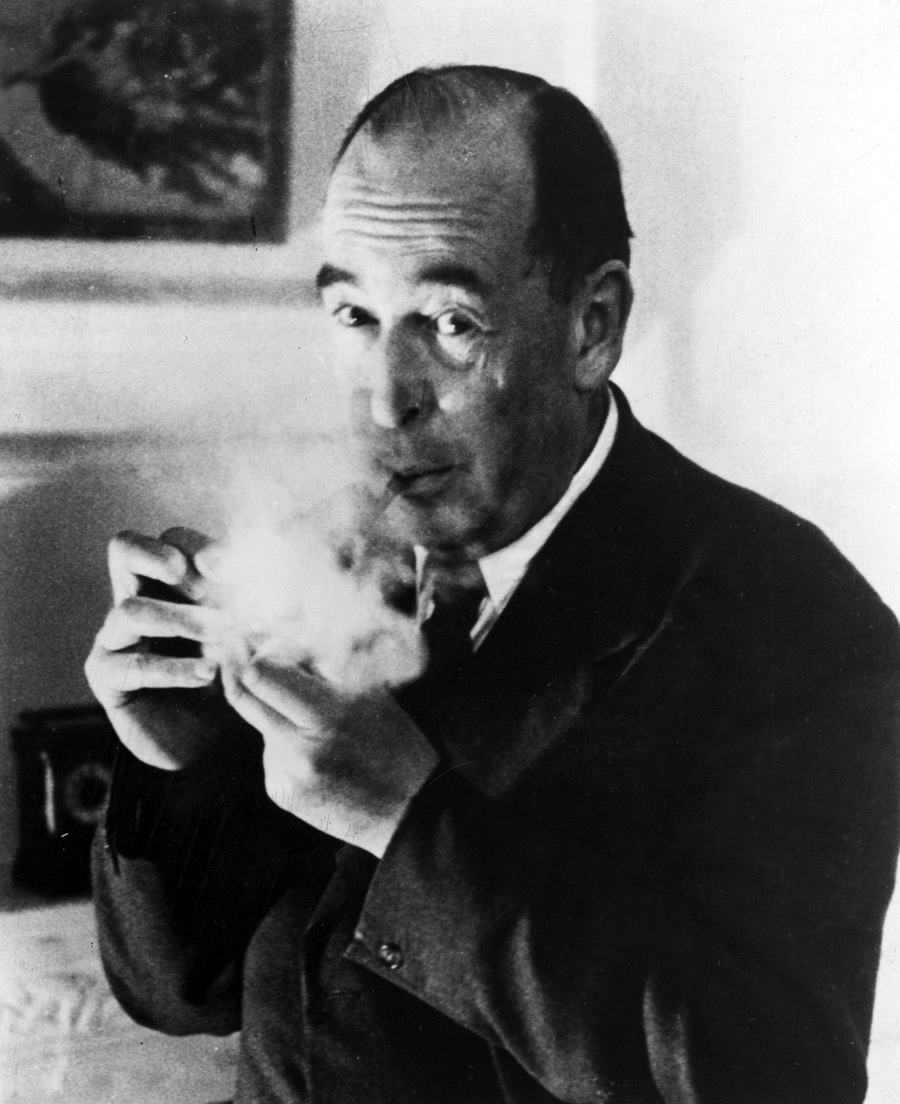
The literature of Aldous Huxley (left) and C. S. Lewis (right) will enter the public domain in Europe in 2034.

Except for Belarus (Life + 50 years) and Spain (which has a copyright term of Life + 80 years for creators that died before 1988), a work enters the public domain in Europe 70 years after the creator's death, if it was published during the creator's lifetime. In addition, several other countries have a limit of 70 years. The list is sorted alphabetically and includes a notable work of the creator.

Names	Country	Death	Occupation	Notable work
Georges Braque	France	31 August 1963	Painter, sculptor	The Viaduct at L'Estaque
Babu Gulabrai	India	13 April 1963	Writer	
Nâzım Hikmet	Turkey	3 June 1963	Poet	Kız Çocuğu
Aldous Huxley	United Kingdom	22 November 1963	Writer, Philosopher	Brave New World
Amar Nath Kak	India	1963	Writer	
John F. Kennedy	United States	22 November 1963	Politician, political writer	Why England Slept, A Nation of Immigrants, Profiles in Courage
C. S. Lewis	United Kingdom	22 November 1963	Writer, Literary scholar	The Chronicles of Narnia
Patrick MacGill	Ireland	23 November 1963	Poet, playwright	Suspense
Brinsley MacNamara	Ireland	4 February 1963	Poet, playwright	The Valley of the Squinting Windows
Louis MacNeice	Ireland; United Kingdom	3 September 1963	Novelist, playwright	Autumn Journal
Laudelino Mejías	Venezuela	30 November 1963	Composer	"Conticinio"
Enrique Pérez Arce	Mexico	25 June 1963	Politician, writer	La Tambora
Rajendra Prasad	India	28 February 1963	Politician, writer	
Hemendra Kumar Roy	India	18 April 1963	Writer	
Laxminarayan Sahu	India	18 January 1963	Writer	
Rahul Sankrityayan	India	14 April 1963	Activist, writer	Meri Jeevan Yatra
Anasuya Shankar	India	29 July 1963	Writer	
Acharya Shivpujan Sahay	India	21 January 1963	Writer	

== Countries with life + 60 years ==
In Bangladesh, India, and Venezuela a work enters the public domain 60 years after the creator's death.

Names	Country	Death	Occupation	Notable work
Aziz Abaza	Egypt	11 July 1973	Poet, politician	
Zainal Abidin Ahmad	Malaysia	23 October 1973	Writer, linguist	
W. H. Auden	United Kingdom	29 September 1973	Poet	
Malek Bennabi	Algeria	31 October 1973	Philosopher	Les Conditions de la Renaissance
Charles Brasch	New Zealand	20 May 1973	Poet, editor	Landfall
Elizabeth Bowen	Ireland; United Kingdom	22 February 1973	Biologist	
Pearl S. Buck	United States	6 March 1973	Novelist	The Good Earth
Amílcar Cabral	Cape Verde; Guinea-Bissau	20 January 1973	Activist	Esta É a Nossa Pátria Amada
Noël Coward	United Kingdom	26 March 1973	Playwright	Noël Coward on stage and screen
John Creasey	United Kingdom	9 June 1973	Writer	Gideon's Day
Jim Croce	United States	20 September 1973	Musician	
Bobby Darin	United States	20 December 1973	Musician	
Henry Darger	United States	13 April 1973	Novelist, artist	In the Realms of the Unreal
Dong Xiwen	China	8 January 1973	Painter	The Founding Ceremony of the Nation
Arthur Freed	United States	12 April 1973	Lyricist, film producer	Singin' in the Rain
John Ford	United States	4 August 1973	Director	John Ford filmography
Ragnar Frisch	Norway	31 January 1973	Economist	
Anthony Gilbert	Great Britain	9 December 1973	Writer	The Vanishing Corpse
Elisabeth Hauptmann	Germany	20 April 1973	Playwright	The Threepenny Opera (with Bertolt Brecht)
Taha Hussein	Egypt	11 July 1973	Poet, politician	The Days
José Alfredo Jiménez	Mexico	23 November 1973	Songwriter	"El Rey"
Lyndon B. Johnson	United States	22 January 1973	Politician	
Raymonde de Kervern	Mauritius	1973	Poet	
Bruce Lee	United States	20 July 1973	Martial artist	Tao of Jeet Kune Do
Kathleen Lindsay	Great Britain	1973	Writer	
Gian Francesco Malipiero	Italy	1 August 1973	Composer, musicologist	L'Orfeide
Cornelia Meigs	United States	1973	Children's writer	The Windy Hill
Nancy Mitford	Great Britain	30 June 1973	Writer	The Pursuit of Love
Pablo Neruda	Chile	23 September 1973	Poet	Canto General, Oda al Gato
Robert C. O'Brien	United States	5 March 1973	Writer	Z for Zachariah
Kid Ory	United States	23 January 1973	Composer	Red Allen, Kid Ory & Jack Teagarden at Newport
Gram Parsons	United States	19 September 1973	Musician	
Isabel Peacocke	New Zealand	12 October 1973	Writer	Cathleen with a 'C'
Pablo Picasso	Spain	8 April 1973	Painter	Guernica, Les Demoiselles d'Avignon
Pixinguinha	Brazil	17 February 1973	Composer	
William Plomer	South Africa	20 September 1973	Writer	
Andy Razaf	United States	3 February 1973	Lyricist	Ain't Misbehavin'
Gopal Prasad Rimal	Nepal	24 October 1973	Poet	Jangi Nishan Hamro
Ivan T. Sanderson	United States	19 February 1973	Biologist	
Nigoghos Sarafian	France	1972	Poet	
Mohammed ash-Shanqîtî	Mauritania; Saudi Arabia	10 January 1973	Muslim scholar	Works
Allan Sherman	United States	20 November 1973	Comedian	"Hello Muddah, Hello Fadduh (A Letter from Camp)"
Ousmane Diop Socé	Senegal	27 October 1973	Poet	Contes et légendes d'Afrique noire
Abdillahi Suldaan Mohammed Timacade	Somalia	6 February 1973	Poet	
Bhim Nidhi Tiwari	Nepal	1973	Poet	Dagbatti
J. R. R. Tolkien	United Kingdom	2 September 1973	Writer	J. R. R. Tolkien bibliography
Valentin Tomberg	Russian Empire	24 February 1973	Mystic	Meditations on the Tarot
Âşık Veysel	Turkey	21 March 1973	Composer	
Alan Watts	United Kingdom	16 November 1973	Philosopher	Alan Watts bibliography
Chic Young	United States	14 March 1973	Cartoonist	Blondie

== Countries with life + 50 years ==
In most countries of Africa and Asia, as well as Belarus, Bolivia, New Zealand, Egypt and Uruguay, a work enters the public domain 50 years after the creator's death.

Names	Country	Death	Occupation	Notable work
Hergé	Belgium	3 March 1983	Comic artist	The Adventures of Tintin
Otto Messmer	United States	28 October 1983	Animator	Felix the Cat

== Countries with life + 80 years ==
Spain has a copyright term of life + 80 years for creators that died before 1988. In Colombia and Equatorial Guinea, a work enters the public domain 80 years after the creator's death.

Names	Country	Death	Occupation	Notable work
Hans Aanrud	Norway	11 January 1953	Writer	
Tamar Abakelia	Georgia	14 May 1953	Sculptor	
Abdullah Yusuf Ali	India	10 December 1953	Translator	The Holy Qur'an: Text, Translation and Commentary
Dimitri Arakishvili	Georgia	13 August 1953	Composer	The Legend of Shota Rustaveli
Agustín Abarca	Chile	28 May 1953	Painter	
Walter Armitage	South Africa	22 February 1953	Playwright	
Vladimir Bakaleinikov	Russia	5 November 1953	Composer, conductor	
Rudolf Bauer	Germany	28 November 1953	Painter	
Arnold Bax	United Kingdom	3 October 1953	Composer, writer	List of compositions by Arnold Bax
Harmsen van der Beek	The Netherlands	24 July 1953	Illustrator, commercial artist	Noddy
Hilaire Belloc	United Kingdom	16 July 1953	Writer	Hilaire Belloc bibliography
Róbert Berény	Hungary	10 September 1953	Painter	Sleeping Lady with Black Vase
Henri Bernstein	France	27 November 1953	Playwright	Samson, Mélo
Elsa Beskow	Sweden	30 June 1953	Writer, illustrator	
Ugo Betti	Italy	9 June 1953	Playwright, judge	The Fugitive
Henrik Bull	Norway	2 June 1953	Architect	National Theatre
Ivan Bunin	Russia	9 June 1953	Writer	List of short stories by Ivan Bunin, List of poems by Ivan Bunin
John Horne Burns	United States	11 August 1953	Writer	The Gallery
Rosario Candela	United States	3 October 1953	Architect	740 Park Avenue
Harold Cazneaux	Australia	19 June 1953	Photographer	Cazneaux Tree
Ahmed Ghulam Ali Chagla	Pakistan	5 February 1953	Composer	"Qaumi Taranah"
Albert Coates	United Kingdom	11 December 1953	Composer, conductor	
Ruth Crawford Seeger	United States	18 November 1953	Composer	String Quartet 1931
Peter DeRose	United States	23 April 1953	Composer	"Deep Purple"
Raoul Dufy	France	23 March 1953	Painter	
Edmund Dulac	France	25 May 1953	Illustrator	
Jean Epstein	France	2 April 1953	Film director	The Fall of the House of Usher
Georges Le Faure	France	25 May 1953	Writer	
Emil Filla	Czech Republic	7 October 1953	Painter	
Konstanty Ildefons Gałczyński	Poland	6 December 1953	Poet	Skumbrie w tomacie
Albert Gleizes	France	23 June 1953	Painter, writer	List of works by Albert Gleizes
Milt Gross	United States	29 November 1953	Cartoonist	Count Screwloose
Guccio Gucci	Italy	2 January 1953	Fashion designer	
Sophia Hayden	United States	3 February 1953	Architect	The Woman's Building
Mary Brewster Hazelton	United States	13 September 1953	Painter	
Jindřich Heisler	Czech Republic	4 January 1953	Photographer, writer and surrealist artist	
Cecil Hepworth	United Kingdom	9 February 1953	Film director, producer	Alice in Wonderland (1903 film)
Tatsuo Hori	Japan	28 May 1953	Writer	The Wind Has Risen
Curuppumullage Jinarajadasa	Sri Lanka	18 June 1953	Writer	Art as a factor in the soul's evolution
Joseph Jongen	Belgium	12 July 1953	Composer	Mass, Op. 130
Emmerich Kálmán	Hungary	30 October 1953	Composer	Die Csárdásfürstin, Countess Maritza, Die Zirkusprinzessin
Thiru. V. Kalyanasundaram	India	17 September 1953	Writer	
Fritz Kirchhoff	Germany	25 June 1953	Film director	Attack on Baku
Moïse Kisling	France	29 April 1953	Painter	
Eduard Künneke	Germany	27 October 1953	Composer	The Cousin from Nowhere
Elisabeth Kuyper	The Netherlands	26 February 1953	Composer	
Jorge de Lima	Brazil	15 November 1953	Politician, writer	
Will Longstaff	Australia	1 July 1953	Painter	Menin Gate at Midnight
Oskar Luts	Estonia	23 March 1953	Writer, playwright	
Kornel Makuszyński	Poland	31 July 1953	Writer	Koziołek Matołek
Herman J. Mankiewicz	United States	5 March 1953	Screenwriter	Citizen Kane
Emmanuel de Margerie	France	20 December 1953	Geographer	
John Marin	United States	2 October 1953	Painter	
Daniel Gregory Mason	United States	4 December 1953	Composer, music critic	
Erich Mendelsohn	Germany	15 September 1953	Architect	List of works by Erich Mendelsohn
Moses Milner	Russia	25 October 1953	Composer	
Mime Misu	Romania	25 October 1953	Dancer, film director	In Nacht und Eis, Das Mirakel
Vera Mukhina	Soviet Union	6 October 1953	Sculptor, painter	Worker and Kolkhoz Woman
Sulaiman Nadvi	Pakistan	22 November 1953	Writer	Khutbat-e-madras
Ibrahim Nagi	Egypt	6 October 1953	Poet	"Al-Atlal"
Francesco Saverio Nitti	Italy	20 February 1953	Politician	
Hisato Ohzawa	Japan	28 October 1953	Composer	Piano Concerto No. 3
Eugene O'Neill	United States	27 November 1953	Playwright	Long Day's Journey into Night
Francis Picabia	France	30 November 1953	Painter	List of works by Francis Picabia
Joseph Pinchon	France	20 June 1953	Illustrator	Bécassine
Uroš Predić	Serbia	12 February 1953	Painter	Happy Brothers
Alice Prin	France	30 November 1953	Model, painter, writer	Kiki's Memoirs
Sergei Prokofiev	Russia	5 March 1953	Composer, conductor	List of compositions by Sergei Prokofiev
Vsevolod Pudovkin	Russia	30 June 1953	Film director, screenwriter	
Roger Quilter	United Kingdom	21 September 1953	Composer	Arnold Book of Old Songs
Rachilde	France	4 April 1953	Writer	Monsieur Vénus
Graciliano Ramos	Brazil	20 March 1953	Writer, translator	Vidas secas
Marjorie Kinnan Rawlings	United States	14 December 1953	Author	The Yearling
Django Reinhardt	France	16 May 1953	Composer, musician	
Winold Reiss	United States	23 August 1953	Painter	Winold Reiss industrial murals
Pasquale Rizzoli	Italy	30 January 1953	Sculptor	
Ludomir Różycki	Poland	1 January 1953	Composer	
Max Sainsaulieu	France	21 February 1953	Architect	Carnegie Library of Reims
Rudolph Schindler	United States	22 August 1953	Architect	Schindler House
Edward Shanks	United Kingdom	4 May 1953	Writer	Fête Galante
Everett Shinn	United States	1 May 1953	Painter	
Joseph Stalin	Russia	5 March 1953	Politician	Economic Problems of Socialism in the USSR
Vladimir Tatlin	Russia	31 May 1953	Painter, architect	Tatlin's Tower
Neyzen Tevfik	Turkey	28 January 1953	Poet, satirist	
Jérôme Tharaud	France	28 January 1953	Writer	
Dylan Thomas	United Kingdom	9 November 1953	Poet	List of works by Dylan Thomas
Totius	South Africa	1 July 1953	Poet	
Julian Tuwim	Poland	27 December 1953	Poet	"Murzynek Bambo"
Jules Van Nuffel	Belgium	25 June 1953	Composer	In convertendo Dominus
Bernard Carra de Vaux	France	1953	Orientalist	
Vydūnas	Lithuania	20 February 1953	Poet	
Erich Weinert	Germany	20 April 1953	Writer	"Der heimliche Aufmarsch"
Ben Ames Williams	United States	4 February 1953	Writer	The Unconquered
Hank Williams	United States	1 January 1953	Musician	List of songs written by Hank Williams
Arthur Wimperis	United Kingdom	14 October 1953	Lyricist, screenwriter	The Arcadians, Mrs. Miniver
Friedrich Wolf	Germany	5 October 1953	Writer	Professor Mamlock
Xu Beihong	China	26 September 1953	Painter	
Vsevolod Zaderatsky	Russia	1 February 1953	Composer	
John Stepan Zamecnik	United States	13 June 1953	Composer	

== United States ==
Under the Copyright Term Extension Act, books published in 1938, films released in 1938, and other works published in 1938 will enter the public domain in 2034. Sound recordings published in 1933 and unpublished works whose authors died in 1963 will also enter the public domain.

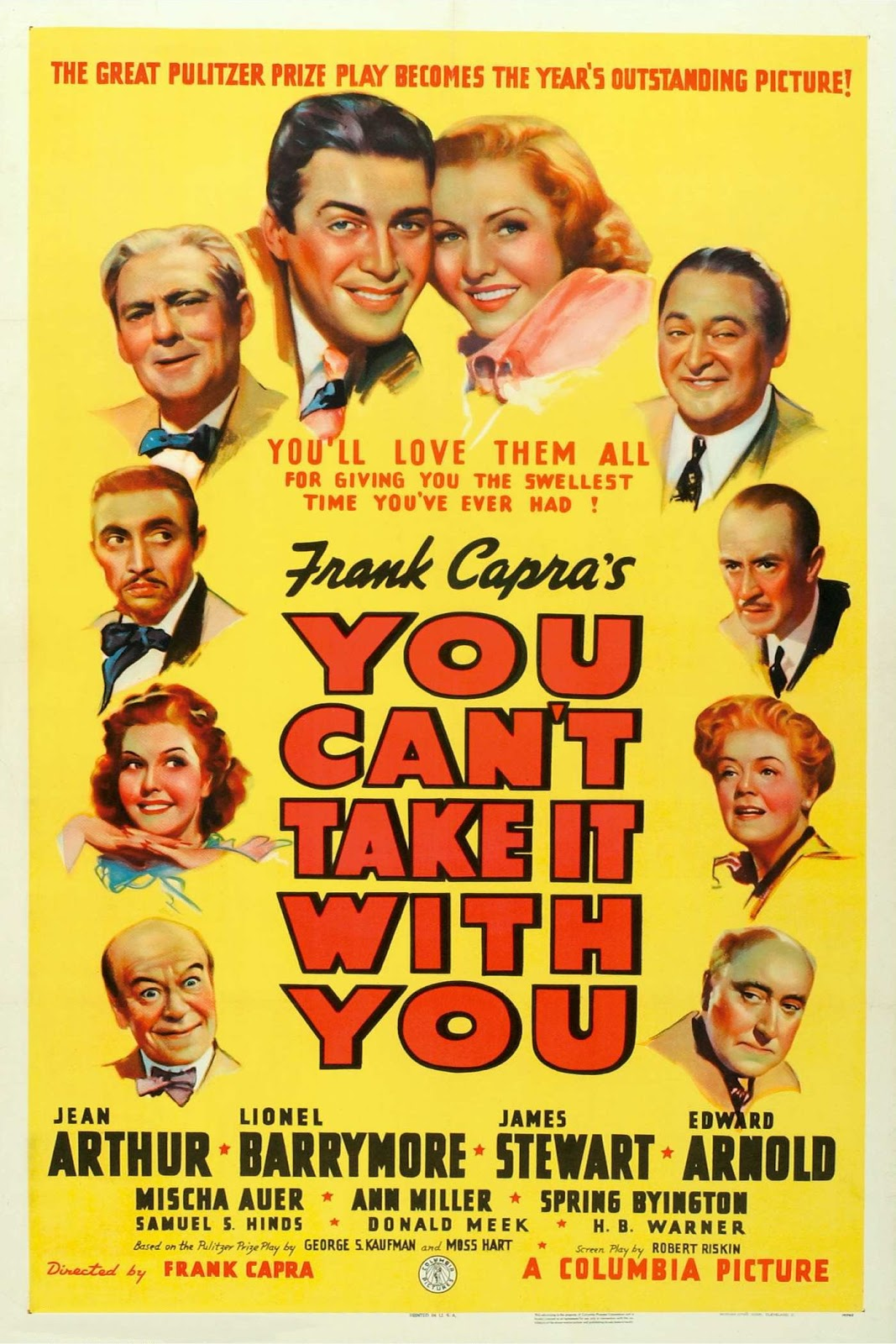
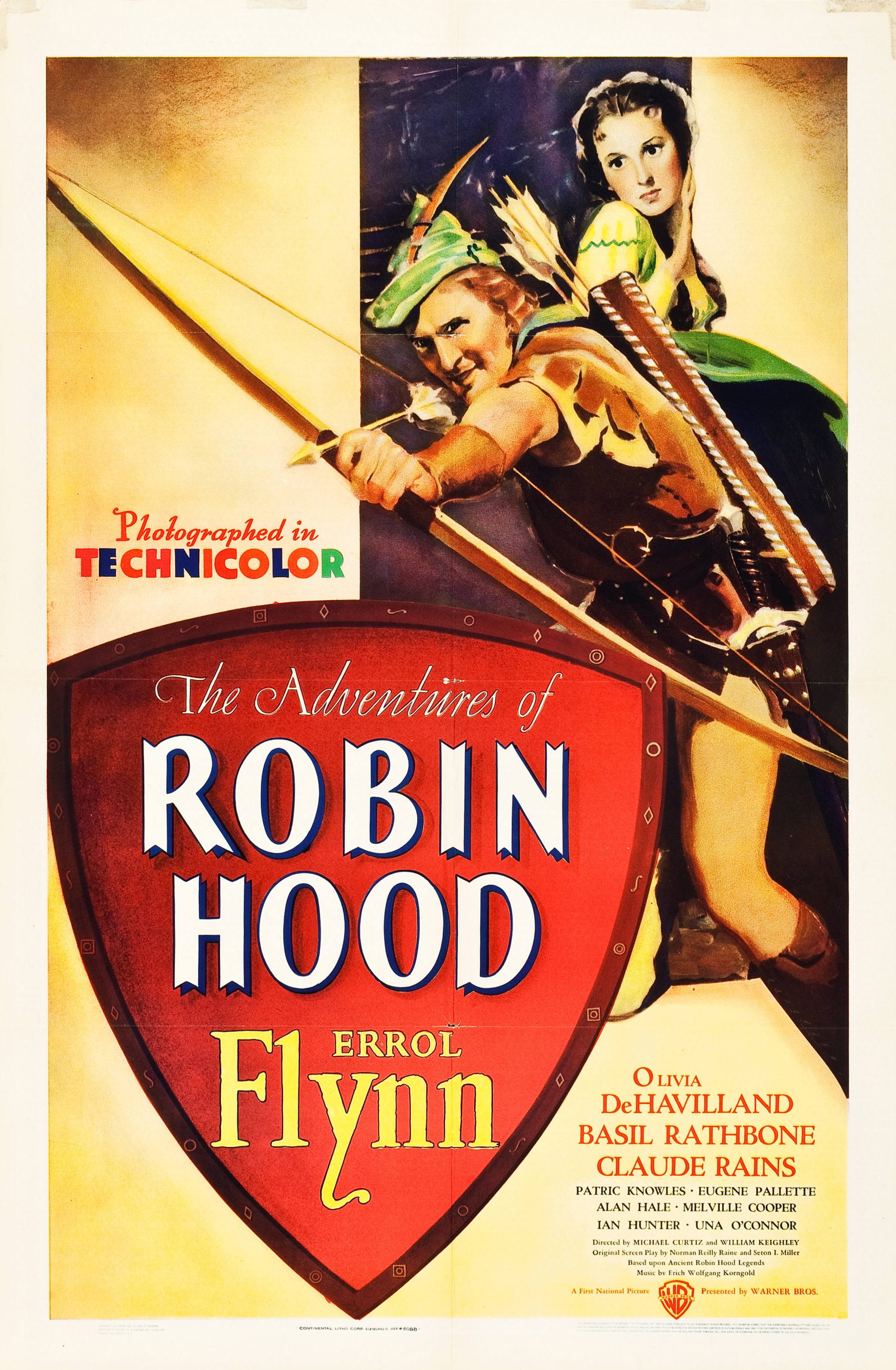
Two of the most significant films entering the public domain in the United States in 2034 are You Can't Take It with You and The Adventures of Robin Hood.

Significant films entering the public domain in 2034 include Frank Capra's Best Picture Academy Award-winning adaptation of You Can't Take It with You starring Jean Arthur alongside Lionel Barrymore and James Stewart, The Adventures of Robin Hood starring Errol Flynn in the title role alongside Olivia de Havilland as Maid Marian, Bringing Up Baby with Cary Grant and Katharine Hepburn, Boys Town with Spencer Tracy and Mickey Rooney, Sergei Eisenstein's historical epic Alexander Nevsky, the musical film Alexander's Ragtime Band based around Irving Berlin's same-named song, Alfred Hitchcock's The Lady Vanishes, William Wyler's Jezebel with Bette Davis and Henry Fonda, David Butler's Kentucky with Loretta Young and Richard Greene, The Big Broadcast of 1938 with W. C. Fields and Bob Hope, the Laurel and Hardy comedy Block-Heads, Roy Rogers' debut film Under Western Stars, Metro-Goldwyn-Mayer's first Technicolor feature film Sweethearts with Jeanette MacDonald and Nelson Eddy, Nancy Drew... Detective introducing its title character to cinema, Victor Fleming's Test Pilot starring Clark Gable, Irving Thalberg's last production Marie Antoinette, Marcel Carné's Port of Shadows, Leni Riefenstahl's documentary film Olympia, Walt Disney's Mickey Mouse cartoon Brave Little Tailor and Silly Symphony short Ferdinand the Bull, Chuck Jones' directorial debut The Night Watchman, and the Looney Tunes cartoons Porky in Wackyland and Porky's Hare Hunt, the latter of which featured a rabbit antagonist who was a prototype of Bugs Bunny. The modern character designs of Mickey Mouse and Minnie Mouse will also enter the public domain, through a single newspaper comic strip published toward the end of the year. Meanwhile, Orson Welles' radio series The Mercury Theatre on the Air, infamous for its War of the Worlds broadcast, was already in the public domain with no proper copyright renewal on any of its scripts.

Among the literary works entering the public domain are Dr. Seuss's children's book The 500 Hats of Bartholomew Cubbins (one of the few books of his not to use his traditional writing style), Marjorie Kinnan Rawlings' The Yearling, Samuel Beckett's first completed novel Murphy, Daphne du Maurier's novel Rebecca, Eric Knight's Lassie Come Home, T.H. White's The Sword in the Stone, the Pulitzer Prize-winning play Our Town, Ferdinand Bordewijk's novel Character, Hardy Boys novel #17 The Secret Warning by Franklin W. Dixon, and Herge's Tintin story The Black Island in its original French black-and-white version. The first seven issues of superhero comic Action Comics, which featured the first incarnations of DC Comics' Superman and Lois Lane, will enter the public domain in 2034; the same will also happen for the original incarnation of Charles Addams’ The Addams Family from their cartoons published in The New Yorker (where the family consisted of only Morticia, Pugsley, Grandmama, and butler Lurch, the last of whom was initially implied to be Morticia's husband and was thus a prototype of Gomez). The Franco-Belgian comic character Spirou will also become public domain in the United States in 2034, alongside the first comic strips of Tif et Tondu and the first issues of the British children's anthology comic magazine The Beano.

Works of art that will enter the public domain include Marc Chagall's White Crucifixion, Salvador Dalí's Apparition of Face and Fruit Dish on a Beach, Frida Kahlo's What the Water Gave Me, Wyndham Lewis' Portrait of T. S. Eliot, and Constantin Brâncuși's Sculptural Ensemble at Târgu Jiu.

Popular songs entering the public domain in 2034 include "Heart and Soul", "Jeepers Creepers", "My Reverie", "Thanks for the Memory", "I Let a Song Go Out of My Heart", "Love Walked In", "I'll Be Seeing You", and "You Must Have Been a Beautiful Baby".

== See also ==
- List of American films of 1938
- 1938 in literature
- 1938 in music
- 1963 in literature and 1983 in literature for deaths of writers
- Public Domain Day
- Creative Commons
