= Laudelino =

Laudelino is a given name. Notable people with the name include:

- Laudelino Barros (born 1975), Brazilian boxer
- Laudelino Cubino (born 1963), Spanish road racing cyclist
- Laudelino Freire (1873–1937), Brazilian journalist, lawyer and author
- Laudelino Mejías (1893–1963), Venezuelan composer
