= Hildegard Quiel =

Hildegard Quiel (23 April 1888 - 14 July 1971) was a German composer and pianist who wrote music for instruments, voice, and the theatre. She composed 25 lieder based on texts by Hermann Hesse.

== Life and works ==
Quiel was born in Berlin, where her father Reinhold Quiel was a professor at the Berlin Main Cadet Academy. She studied at the Berlin Academy of Music (today the Berlin University of the Arts) from 1909 to 1913. Her teachers included Elisabeth Kuyper and Engelbert Humperdinck. She died in Weiler im Allgäu.

Quiel was a member of the American Society of Composer, Authors and Publishers (ASCAP). Her music was published by Paragon Verlag, and included:

=== Chamber ===
- Trio (violin, cello and piano)
- Sonata (violin and piano)

=== Theatre ===
- Rosenrot (Rose Red)
- Schneeweisschen (Snow White)

=== Vocal ===
- 25 lieder (texts by Hermann Hesse)
