= Lights of New York =

Lights of New York may refer to:

- Lights of New York (1928 film), the first all-talking feature film
- Lights of New York (1916 film), a silent drama film directed by Van Dyke Brooke

== See also ==
- The Lights of New York
