= Lights of New York (1928 film) =

1928 film by Bryan Foy

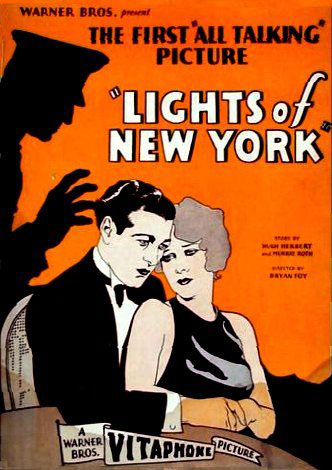
- Theatrical release poster
- Directed by: Bryan Foy
- Written by: Murray Roth; Hugh Herbert
- Starring: Helene Costello; Cullen Landis; Wheeler Oakman; Eugene Pallette
- Cinematography: Edwin B. DuPar
- Edited by: Jack Killifer
- Music by: Louis Silvers
- Production company: Warner Bros. Pictures
- Distributed by: Warner Bros. Pictures
- Release dates: July 6, 1928; July 21, 1928
- Running time: 57 minutes
- Country: United States
- Language: English
- Budget: $23,000
- Box office: $1,252,000

Lights of New York is a 1928 American crime drama film starring Helene Costello, Cullen Landis, Wheeler Oakman and Eugene Pallette, and directed by Bryan Foy. Filmed in the Vitaphone sound-on-disc sound system, it is the first all-talking full-length feature film. It was released by Warner Bros. Pictures, who had introduced the first feature-length film with synchronized sound, Don Juan, in 1926; and the first with spoken dialogue, The Jazz Singer, in 1927. The film cost $23,000 to produce (a "B" picture), and grossed over $1 million. The enthusiasm with which audiences greeted the talkies was so great that by the end of 1929, Hollywood was producing sound films exclusively.

== Plot ==
Lights of New York (1928)

When bootleggers Jake Jackson and Dan Dickson, who have been hiding out in a small upstate New York town, learn that they finally can return to New York City, they try to convince a young kid named Eddie Morgan and his friend, a local barber named Gene to come with them.

With a promise from Jackson and Dickson that they will help the young men establish a barbershop in the city, Eddie asks his mother, Mrs. Morgan, who owns the town's Morgan Hotel, to loan them $5,000 of her savings. Eddie and Gene set up the barbershop in New York City but soon learn that it is merely a front for a speakeasy.

Frustrated and yearning for a return to the quiet life, Gene and Eddie vow to go home as soon as they earn enough to pay back Mrs. Morgan. Eddie is in love with Kitty Lewis, his hometown sweetheart, who preceded him to New York. Now she is a performer at The Night Hawk, a nightclub owned by Hawk Miller, notorious bootlegger who controls the speakeasy behind the barbershop. Although Hawk's longtime mistress, Molly Thompson, warns him not to pursue Kitty, he coldly dismisses her, saying that their relationship is over.

After a police officer is killed in a bootlegging raid of a supply of Old Century liquor, Hawk tells his henchmen that they must find someone to take the blame to keep the police from closing him down. They suggest that Hawk frame Eddie, thereby "killing two birds with one stone." When Eddie comes to the club to visit Kitty, Hawk summons him to his office and asks him to hide his supply of Old Century, saying that it is only temporary, in case the police raid his club. When Detective Crosby comes to the club to question Hawk and implies that he is behind the policeman's murder, Hawk says that the only person he knows who has a supply of Old Century is Eddie.

A short time later, Hawk goes to the barbershop and is killed by an unknown assailant. Fearing that they will be blamed, Eddie and Gene put Hawk's body in a barber chair and cover his face with shaving cream just as Crosby arrives at the shop. After Eddie leaves, a nervous Gene pretends to shave Hawk, but the body slides from the chair, revealing its identity to Crosby. Although Gene swears that the absent Eddie is innocent, Crosby deduces that Eddie has gone to Kitty's apartment and follows him there. Crosby is about to arrest Eddie and Kitty, when Molly arrives and reveals that she killed Hawk because he no longer wanted her. Molly is prepared to pay for her crime but Crosby spares her, informing her that there is a reward, dead or alive, for the killer of the policeman. Now freed from their obligation to Hawk, Kitty and Eddie take the next train home.

== Cast ==
- Helene Costello as Kitty Lewis
- Cullen Landis as Eddie Morgan
- Eugene Pallette as Gene
- Mary Carr as Mrs. Morgan
- Wheeler Oakman as "Hawk" Miller
- Gladys Brockwell as Molly Thompson
- Robert Elliott as Detective Crosby
- Tom McGuire as Detective Collins
- Tom Dugan as henchman
- Guy D'Ennery as henchman
- Walter Percival as Jake Jackson
- Jere Delaney as Dan Dickson
- Harry Downing as cabaret entertainer

== Songs ==
Harry Downing performing At Dawnin'

- "National Emblem March" composed by Edwin Eugene Bagley (1902)" (danced by chorus girls in nightclub sequence)
- "At Dawnin'" (sung by Harry Downing)

== Production ==
Directed by Foy from a script written by Murray Roth and comedian Hugh Herbert, Lights of New York was intended to be a two-reel film with a budget of $12,000 as Warner Bros. Pictures had not yet committed to regular production of full-length talking films. However, with studio heads Harry and Jack Warner out of the country to oversee the European premiere of The Jazz Singer, the crew gradually elaborated the plot as the seven-day shooting schedule progressed. Louis Halper, who was in charge of the studio while the Warners were away, eventually wired Jack Warner for the additional money needed to finish the film.

Upon discovering that Foy had shot four reels more than promised, Jack Warner ordered him to cut the film back to the original two. Foy later said that the Warners' initial rejection was possibly based on their plans to make the first all-talkie a prestige picture. In an effort to keep the movie off the shelf, Foy screened the picture for an exhibitor friend, who immediately offered to buy it outright for $25,000. Upon hearing this, the Warners asked Albert Warner to view the film, and his praise of Lights convinced Jack and Harry that their decision was premature, securing the film's release.

== Reception ==
Contemporary critical reception of Lights of New York was decidedly cool. A New York Times review, while acknowledging the film's place as "the alpha of what may develop as the new language of the screen", called the plot "crude in the extreme" and the direction wooden, only singling out the musical interludes for praise. "Ordinary cast and production", reported Film Daily. "Discard the talking element, and it is just a second-rate meller." Variety was even more harsh in its dismissal, labeling the production "hokumed junk." "In a year from now everyone concerned...will run for the river before looking at it again." Oliver Claxton of The New Yorker also panned the film. "It would have been better silent, and much better unseen. The talking films have not even progressed to their infancy yet. Bad as it is, though, the film shows what I have been very reluctant to believe, that audibility will be a great help to the movies."

=== Box office ===
The criticism did not keep audiences away, but demand may have been driven more by the novelty of the first "all-talking" feature film than the film's dramatic qualities. A preview engagement in Pasadena, California resulted in lines around the block, and the first week's gross at New York City's Mark Strand Theater amounted to $47,000. Upon nationwide release, the film grossed $1.2 million, making the film a box-office success.

According to records at Warner Bros., the film earned $1,160,000 in the U.S. and $92,000 in other markets.

== Preservation status ==
The film and the Vitaphone soundtrack still survive in complete form. In a formal ceremony on July 24, 1946, Albert Warner presented a print of Lights of New York to the Library of Congress as part of a yearlong celebration of the twentieth anniversary of the premiere of the Warner Bros. studio's first sound features.

The film is currently available on DVD by Warner Bros. Home Entertainment and is now widely available online after it entered the public domain on January 1, 2024.

Most current prints crop off part of the main title. This is because the title card was photographed using the traditional (for 1928) silent-film aperture, allowing for a full-screen picture area. When the picture and sound were combined for sound-on-film prints, however, the aperture was now smaller to accommodate the soundtrack, so the picture was cropped.

== See also ==
- List of early sound feature films (1926–1929)
- List of early Warner Bros. sound and talking features
