= Washing the Ethiopian White =

Aesop's fable

Washing the Ethiopian (or at some periods the Blackamoor) White is one of Aesop's Fables and is numbered 393 in the Perry Index. The fable is only found in Greek sources and, applied to the impossibility of changing character, became proverbial at an early date. It was given greater currency in Europe during the Renaissance by being included in emblem books and then entered popular culture. There it was often used to reinforce outright racist attitudes.

== The fable and its meaning ==
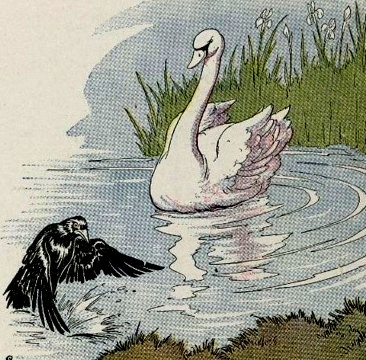
Milo Winter's illustration of the companion fable of "The Raven and the Swan", 1919

The story concerns the owner of a black slave who imagines that he has been neglected by his former master and tries to wash off the blackness. Some versions mention that this goes on so long that the poor man is made ill or even dies of a cold. In early times, the Greek word Άιθιοψ (Aithiops) was used of anyone of black colour; in the unreliable version by Syntipas, the man (who there is washing himself in a river) is identified as from India.

The usual meaning given the fable is that a person's basic nature cannot be changed or, as Thomas Bewick has it in his tale "The Blackamoor": "What's bred in the bone will never come out of the flesh". He goes on to comment that "when men aspire to eminence in any of the various arts or sciences, without being gifted with the innate powers or abilities for such attainments, it is only like attempting to wash the Blackamoor white."

In the 18th and 19th centuries, the fable was used to underline the perception of the black man's 'natural' inferiority, both moral and social. So, while Bewick's generalising conclusion seems innocent enough, its uglier subtext becomes apparent when referred back to the allusion to the fable in The Pilgrim's Progress (1678):

There the travellers come across the characters Fool and Want-Wit 'washing of an Ethiopian with intention to make him white, but the more they washed him the blacker he was. They then asked the Shepherds what that should mean. So they told them, saying, "Thus shall it be with the vile person. All means used to get such a one a good name shall in conclusion tend but to make him more abominable."

== Emblematic and proverbial use ==
Early allusion to the fable appears in the work of Lucian, who uses the phrase Αιθοπα σμηχεις proverbially in his epigram "Against an Ignoramus":

You wash the Ethiopian in vain; why not give up the task?
You will never manage to turn black night into day.

In the 15th century the proverb appeared in the Greek collection of Michael Apostolius (1.71), which was consulted by Erasmus when he was compiling his Adagia. In this book, which was written in Latin but cited Greek sources, Erasmus gave two versions. Firstly Aethiopem lavas or dealbas (You wash or make the Ethiopian white), which appeared in a list of other impossible tasks. The other version was Aethiops non albescit (The Ethiopian does not whiten).

Though the Adagia's many editions were one source for the proverb's widespread use in Europe, another work was equally influential. This was Andrea Alciato's Book of Emblems, first published in 1534 with frequent later editions. Here a despondent Ethiopian is pictured seated at a fountain where two Europeans are attempting to wash away his colour; the illustration is followed by a translation into Latin of Lucian's epigram. From here the theme was taken up by Hieronymus Osius (1564) and the English emblematist Geoffrey Whitney (1586). The long verse commentary by the latter draws the conclusion that Nature is not to be withstood; therefore in all dealings 'Let reason rule, and doe the thinges thou maie'.

A third source reinforcing use of the fable in Christian Europe was an apparent reference to it by the Jewish prophet Jeremiah: 'Can the Nubian ['Cushite' in the Hebrew] change his skin or the leopard his spots?' (13.23). Dating from the turn of the 6th century BCE, it suggests that a proverb of West Asian origin may even have preceded the fable. However, the episode of the baptized Ethiopian in the Christian New Testament (Acts 8.26–39) taught the different lesson that outward appearance is not everything and even that the inward nature may be changed, giving rise to the paradox at the start of Richard Crashaw's epigram on this subject: 'Let it no longer be a forlorn hope/ To wash an Ethiop'.

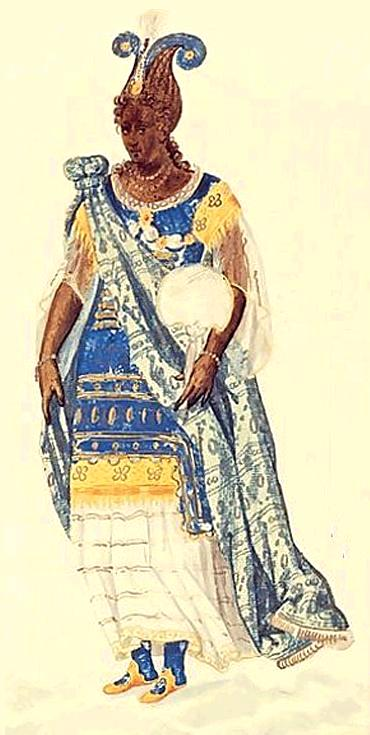
A design for the daughter of Niger by Inigo Jones

The ability to undo the created order of the world is through the action of divine grace, and it is this doctrine which underlies the Renaissance pagan presentation of Ben Jonson's "The Masque of Blackness" (1605). In it Niger, the god of the Nile, emerges from the ocean in search of a country where the skin of his black daughters can be whitened. The Ethiopian moon-goddess reassures him that his quest is at an end in Britain, which is

Ruled by a sun, that to this height doth grace it :
Whose beams shine day and night, and are of force
To blanch an Æthiop, and revive a corse.
His light sciential is, and, past mere nature,
Can salve the rude defects of every creature.
Call forth thy honor'd daughters then :
And let them, 'fore the Britain men,
Indent the land, with those pure traces
They flow with, in their native graces.
Invite them boldly to the shore;
Their beauties shall be scorch'd no more :
This sun is temperate, and refines
All things on which his radiance shines.

The same idea is returned to in Jonson's later masque, "The Gypsies Metamorphosed" (1621), which also involves change of skin colour from tawny to white.

For all that, a number of allied proverbs maintaining the opposite still persisted: they include negative statements such as "black will take no other hue", "one cannot wash a blackamoor white." and "a crow is never the whiter for washing." The last of these proverbs may have originated from the derivative fable of "The Raven and the Swan" recorded by Aphthonius (Perry Index 398). In this a raven, envying the swan's plumage, tries to bathe away its colour and dies of hunger. Lying at the back of it, and the associated lesson that a person's basic nature cannot be changed, is one of the proverbs of Ahiqar, Aesop's Near Eastern counterpart. "If water would stand still in heaven, and a black crow become white, and myrrh grow sweet as honey, then ignorant men and fools might understand and become wise."

In the later context of the slave trade and the racial mixing that followed, the proverbial phrase was given a new meaning. So it is recorded that, in Barbados, "where you find a European and an African mating, the product was a mulatto; a European and a mulatto mated, the product was an octoroon, one eighth white; if that octoroon mated with a white, the product was a quadroon, a quarter white; if a quadroon and a white mated, the product was a mustee; and if that mustee and a European mated, the product was a mustifino, or seven eighths white (or as they said, 'seven eighths human') and that process was called 'washing the blackamoor white.'"

== Popular references ==
The majority of popular depictions of the fable in Britain and America remained more or less offensive. The lyrics of the comic opera The Blackamoor Wash'd White (1776) by Henry Bate Dudley have been quoted as perpetuating negative racist stereotypes. In 1805 the writer William Godwin, using the pen-name Edward Baldwin, included the fable (under the title "Washing the Blackamoor White") in his Fables ancient and modern, adapted for the use of children. In it he demonstrates the inadvisability of spinning out Aesop's pithy telling in tedious modern detail and also how difficult it is for even a 'liberal' philosopher to rise above the spirit of the age. The humourist Thomas Hood manages no better in his poem "A Black Job", which takes as its subject a bogus philanthropic scheme to bathe away the skin colour of Africans so that they "Go in a raven and come out a swan."

Visual depictions are little better. Isaac Cruikshank issued a caricature print in 1795 under the title "Washing the Blackamoor White". Satirising the mistress of the future George IV, it shows Frances Villiers, Countess of Jersey, sitting in an arm-chair while two ladies wash her face, which has the complexion of a mulatto. The Prince of Wales crouches at her feet, holding out a basin. In a speech bubble, he says: "Another Scrub & then!! take more water," as she enquires, "Does it look any whiter?" The lady on the right holds a scrubbing-brush and puts a soap-ball to Lady Jersey's face.

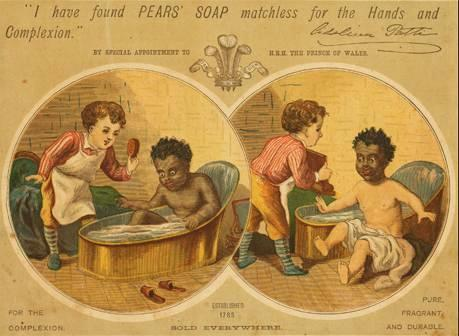
The original Pears soap advertisement based on Aesop's fable, 1884

The same title was used for a Punch cartoon in 1858, with the subtitle 'Sir Jung Bahadoor and his Knights Companions of the Bath.' This referred to the ennobling of the ruler of Nepal as Knight Grand Cross of the Order of the Bath in return for his support during the Indian Mutiny. In a travesty of Alciato's emblematic image, a group of knights clad in mediaeval armour keep a bath topped up with hot water and scrub down the king, who crouches in it wearing his regalia. The accompanying text referred to this as an 'ineffectual ablution' and commented that 'Jung Bahadoor is a gentleman of a dark red complexion. The Bath will not render it white'.

A series of Pears Soap advertisements also took the fable as its theme, depicting a black child literally losing his skin colour after using the product. It first appeared in the Graphic magazine for Christmas 1884 and made an immediate impact. Soon there was a reference to it in "Poor Little Liza", a popular song by the minstrel showman Harry Hunter, with the chorus 'And as for poor Liz, poor little Liza,/ I regret to say,/ She got two cakes of Pears soap/ And washed herself away. A later advertisement for Christmas 1901 shows a black mother carrying a screaming child out to a washing tub while three concerned youngsters peer round the corner of the cabin. It is captioned 'Oh Golly, she's gwine to make dat nigger white'.

== See also ==
- Aethiopia
- Murzynek Bambo - a much-loved Polish poem in which a black child tries to wash off his skin colour.
- Skin whitening
- Curse of Ham
