= John Horne Burns =

American writer

- Born: October 7, 1916; Andover, Massachusetts, U.S.
- Died: August 11, 1953 (aged 36); Cecina, Tuscany, Italy
- Education: Harvard University
- Occupations: Novelist; military intelligence officer; teacher
- Writing career
- Period: 1945–1953
- Genre: Fiction

John Horne Burns (October 7, 1916 – August 11, 1953) was an American writer, the author of three novels. The first, The Gallery (1947), is his best known work, was very well received when published, and has been reissued several times.

== Biography ==
Burns was born in 1916 in Andover, Massachusetts. He was the eldest of seven children in an upper-middle-class Irish Catholic family. He was educated by the Sisters of Notre Dame at St. Augustine's School and then Phillips Academy, where he pursued music. He attended Harvard, where he became fluent in French, German, and Italian and wrote the book for a student musical comedy in 1936. In 1937 he graduated Phi Beta Kappa with a BA in English magna cum laude and became a teacher at the Loomis School in Windsor, Connecticut. Burns wrote several novels while at Harvard and at Loomis, none of which he published.

He was drafted into the US Army as a private in 1942. He attended the Adjutant General's School in Washington, D.C. Commissioned a second lieutenant and sent overseas in 1943, he served in military intelligence in Casablanca and Algiers and then for a year and a half in Italy, mainly in Naples, the setting for The Gallery. There, he censored prisoner-of-war mail. After his discharge in 1946 he returned to teaching at Loomis.

At Loomis, he completed The Gallery in April 1946. Harper & Brothers published it in 1947 and it became a best-seller. It depicted life in Allied-occupied North Africa and Naples in 1944 from the perspective of several different characters. Burns explored the average man's resentment of the military, his struggle to assert his individuality within the complex war effort, the tension between officers and enlisted men, the psychological effects of dislocation, economic and social inequality between the Americans and those they defeated, the experience of homosexual military personnel, and the popular life of Naples in 1944 under Allied occupation. The title referred to the Galleria Umberto I, a shopping arcade in Naples through which all of the main characters pass. The work was unconventional in structure, comprising portraits of nine characters interspersed with eight recollections narrated by an anonymous American soldier following a route much like the one Burns tracked.

In the words of Paul Fussell, "Burns relied on discontinuity, like a sort of prose T.S. Eliot, thus suggesting incoherence as a contemporary social characteristic." Major newspapers and authors including Ernest Hemingway and Edmund Wilson praised it. The Saturday Review called the novel "the best war book of the year". John Dos Passos wrote:

It is written with a reality of detail and a human breadth and passion of understanding that is tonic, healthgiving. If Americans can still write in this sort of exultation of pity and disgust of the foul spots in the last few years of our history, then perhaps there is still hope that we can recover our manhood as a nation and our sense of purpose in the world.

A 1949 survey of the literature of World War II in Military Affairs credited Burns for the novel's "psychological study of rear echelon service personnel" and for capturing their speech, faulting only his attempt to depict infantry combat. Charles Poore in the New York Times thought Burns "has a great deal on the ball and he'll do even better when he gets it more under control." He called it "a rancorously vivid portrait" of "the mentally and morally lost" and noted that "some of its gamier passages show that you can say practically anything in a novel now." Time magazine mentioned that the novel depicted "an evening spent in a homosexuals' hangout", an entire chapter other reviewers left unmentioned.

Gore Vidal later reported a conversation he had with Burns following The Gallery's success:

Burns was a difficult man who drank too much, loved music, detested all other writers, wanted to be great.... He was also certain that to be a great writer it was necessary to be homosexual. When I disagreed, he named a half dozen celebrated contemporaries. "A Pleiad," he roared delightedly, "of pederasts!" But what about Faulkner?, I asked, and Hemingway? He was disdainful. Who said they were any good?

A decade later, surveying the American abroad as a literary type, Frederic Morton noted how the post-World War II role of conqueror proved so uncomfortable that "with the possible exception of John Horne Burns's The Gallery, no really distinguished novel has recorded it." By 1991 it had become, in Herbert Mitgang's words, "that forgotten gem of a novel". In 2011 William Zinsser described it as "the proto-Vietnam novel, anticipating by a generation the hubris that 'the ugly American' would bring to another foreign land" by asking "who was more degraded: the Italians hustling to feed their families, or the GIs selling their cheaply bought PX goods at a huge profit?"

Now sought for his own views on literature, Burns authored an occasional appreciative review, but became well known for unmeasured critiques of both peers and more successful writers, including James Michener, Thomas Wolfe, and Somerset Maugham. His second novel, Lucifer with a Book, a satirical representation of life at a boarding school much like Loomis, appeared in 1949 to largely unfavorable reviews. Vidal said it was "perhaps the most savagely attacked book of its day." Michener wrote decades later: "Never in my memory had they come so close to total annihilation of an author's work." Disheartened by the critical reception of his second novel, Burns returned to Italy in 1950, this time choosing Florence. There he wrote his last published work, A Cry of Children (1952), which was marketed as "a merciless novel" of "young love in the bohemian fringe-world". Its principal character was a composer and pianist likely modeled on his Harvard classmate Irving Fine. That novel also received negative press, though he remained still a young writer of promise. One critic wrote in the New York Times:

Lacking in real significance, flawed by excessive malice and nightmarish distortions, [A Cry of Children], nevertheless, reaffirms the author's status as one of America's gifted young writers. Perhaps his next one will bring both talent and subject-matter into sharper focus.

He began work on a fourth novel, left unfinished at his death. He supported himself by writing a piece about the city for Holiday.

In his time in Florence, he was known to drink to excess and complain of critics, rivals, and both friends and enemies. Vidal never saw him there: "In those years one tried not to think of Burns; it was too bitter. The best of us all had taken the worst way."

According to his biographer, journalist David Margolick, on August 6, 1954, Burns began to feel sick while sailing, and later that day, he was diagnosed with sunstroke. His conditions worsened, and on August 10, he fell into a coma and was admitted to a local hospital. The following day, he died, with the official cause of death being an old brain injury that was aggravated by the recent episode of sunstroke or by a cerebral hemorrhage. Due to complications with Italians customs, it took three weeks for his body to return to the U.S. A funeral service was held at St. Anne’s Church on St. Stephen Street before Burns was buried in the family plot in Holyhood Cemetery in Brookline, Massachusetts.

Hemingway later sketched Burns's brief life as a writer: "There was a fellow who wrote a fine book and then a stinking book about a prep school and then just blew himself up."

In 1959–1960, a plan for a film in the Italian neorealist mode based on The Gallery was postponed when the participants argued about the negative depiction of both the Neapolitans and Americans.

Some of Burns's papers, including student works and unpublished manuscripts, are held at the Howard Gotlieb Archival Research Center, Boston University.

One chapter of The Gallery, "Queen Penicillin", has been included in collections of short stories, such as The Best Short Stories of World War II, An American Anthology (1957) and American Men at Arms (1964). Another chapter, the narrator's first assessment of the Americans' treatment of the Neapolitans, was included in The Vintage Book of War Fiction (1999).

== Writing ==
- The Gallery (1947), reissued several times by various publishers, by New York Review Books Classics in 2004
- Lucifer with a Book (1949)
- A Cry of Children (1951)
