= Moses Milner =

Russian composer (1886–1953)

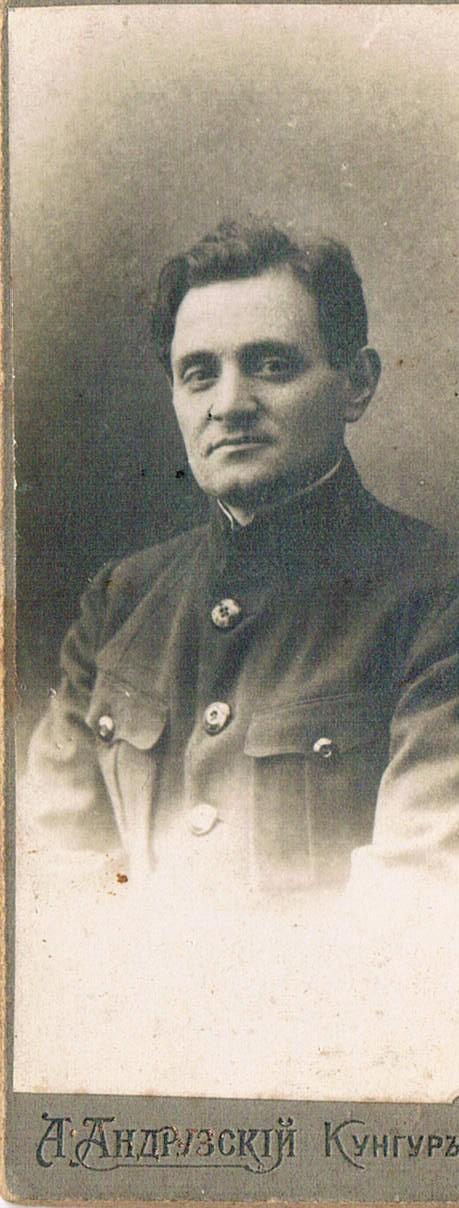
- Born: Mikhail Arnoldovich Milner; 1886; Rokitno Basilovsky, Kiev Governorate, Russian Empire
- Died: 1953 (aged 66–67); Leningrad, Soviet Union
- Education: Kiev Conservatory; St. Petersburg Conservatory
- Occupations: Pianist, composer

Mikhail "Moshe" Arnoldovich Milner (Мильнер, Михаил "Моше" Арнольдович; 1886–1953) was a Russian Jewish pianist and composer. He is notable as composer, and conductor, of the first Yiddish opera in post-revolution Russia "Die Himlen brenen" ("The Heavens Burn") in 1923.

== Biography ==
Moses Milner was born in Rokitno Basilovsky, Kiev Governorate in 1886.

He sang in the choir of the Brodsky Choral Synagogue in Kiev, then attended the Kiev Conservatory. He studied at the St. Petersburg Conservatory from 1907 till 1915. While in St Petersburg Milner began to compose Yiddish songs for Susman Kiselgof (Зусман Кисельгоф)'s Society for Jewish Folk Music (Общество еврейской народной музыки). He also wrote incidental music for Jewish theaters. He provided music for the Habima Theater and State Jewish Theater, Moscow (GOSET) (Государственный еврейский театр (ГОСЕТ)), and the Leningrad choir Evokans (Евоканс).

He died in Leningrad in 1953.
