= Laxminarayan Sahu =

Indian Odia-language writer and poet (1890–1963)

- Born: Laxminarayan Khetramohan Sahu; 3 October 1890; Manikhamba, Balasore
- Died: 18 January 1963 (aged 72)
- Occupation: writer

Dr. Laxminarayan Sahu (3 October 1890 – 18 January 1963) was a writer, poet, journalist, social worker, reformer, historian, politician from Odisha, India.

He was born in a village named Manikhamba near Balasore and was the only son of his father, Khetramohan Sahu and got degrees of M.A. and L.L.B. after graduation from school. He was a teacher of repute. He was noted for his writings and books recording the tribal myths of Odisha. His stories were connected with creation, heaven, and hell, life and death, which the tribal people of Odisha have been taken down from the lips to lips from generations. He was also deeply involved in promotion and preservation of folk dance and music of Odisha and Odia culture, language and literature. Apart from Odia he was also known for his writings in Hindi, Bengali, English and Sanskrit. His other famous stories are "Veena", "Sulata", "Control Room", poems " Pashara " and social story of "Springs of the Soul " etc. He was also editor of the Odia newspaper Sahakaara and English dailies - Vatarini and Star of Utkal As a reformer, he fought against untouchability and social evils against women.

He was elected to Odisha Assembly in 1947 and was a member of Constituent Assembly of India. He was noted for his fiery and to the fact debates while drafting of constitution of India and even Dr. B. R. Ambedkar had to admit in context of arguments put forth by Laxminarayan Sahu that the Constitution was carrying contradictions, harmful enough to shatter India, unless removed by the people's representatives in the earliest opportunity. At the debate in Constituent Assembly of India, he is said to have thundered:- Mr. Kamath has quietly introduced in it the God too. Some people hold that there is no God. The people of India do not want God.

He was awarded Padma Shri in year 1955 for his contributions in field of Literature & Education. He was also given title of Ithihasaratna for his works and writings on history of Odisha. He was a member of Asiatic Society, President of Odisha Sahitya Academy and also a member of Servants of India Society.

A school in Cuttack has been named after him as Lakshmi Narayan Sahu Mahavidyalaya.
