= Ousmane Diop Socé =

Senegalese writer and politician (1911–1973

Ousmane Diop Socé (October 31, 1911, Rufisque, Senegal, French West Africa – October 27, 1973, Dakar, Senegal) was a writer, politician, and one of the first Senegalese novelists.

== Biography ==
He attended a Qur'anic school, and later entered into the colonial school system, from which he would become one of the first African students to receive a scholarship to study at a French university. He studied veterinary medicine, during which time he had two novels published in Paris, France: Karim (1935) and Mirages de Paris (1937). The former expressed a concern of Socé's where young Africans would face problems moving from rural to urban areas, while in the latter he incorporated his own experiences in writing about the tragic love story of a Senegalese student and a French woman. Like that of other early Senegalese novelists, his writing was heavily influenced by his French counterparts—inventing a plot and leading their characters into various sorts of adventures. They also borrowed techniques such as dialogue, flashbacks, and stream of consciousness.

Socé later wrote a number of animal and historical tales in his Contes et légendes d'Afrique noire (1942; "Stories and Legends of Black Africa"), which he drew from Senegalese oral tradition. He founded the magazine Bingo in 1953, and in 1956 had Rythmes du Khalam, a volume of poetry, published.

Socé served in the French Senate from 1946 to 1952 and in the Sénat de la Communauté from 1959 to 1961. He also served as Senegal's ambassador to the United States and delegate to the United Nations. However, he was forced to retire in 1968 due to increasing blindness.
