= Vladimir Bakaleinikov =

American classical composer

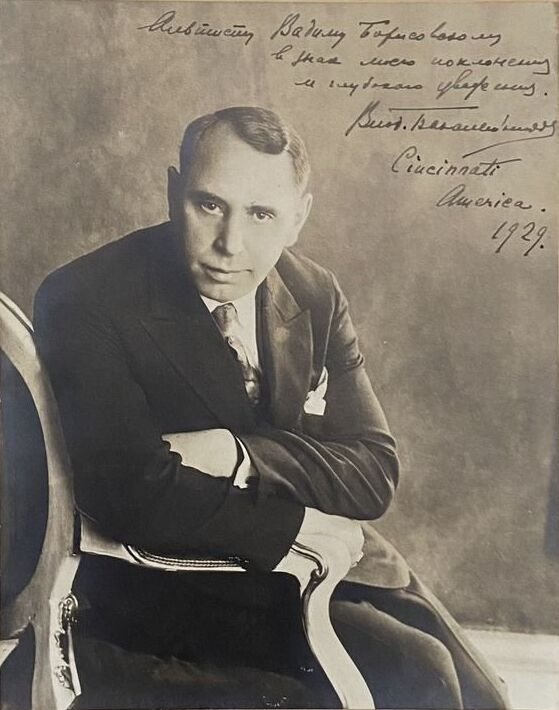
1929

Vladimir Romanovich Bakaleinikov, also Bakaleynikov and Bakaleinikoff (Russian: Владимир Романович Бакалейников; 3 October 1885 in Moscow – 5 November 1953 in Pittsburgh) was a Russian-American violist, music educator, conductor and composer.

== Life and career ==
Bakaleinikov, the son of a noted clarinetist, was from a large musical family who lived in poverty. His elder brother was flautist, composer and conductor Nikolai Bakaleinikov (1881–1957), his younger brothers, both composers, were Mikhail (Mischa) Bakaleinikov (1890–1960) and Constantin Bakaleinikoff (1898–1966).

"My father earned very little. We children helped him by playing at weddings, in restaurants, giving lessons, and later concertizing. We did not refuse any type of work. It was shameful not to be working, seeing as our mother did all of the washing, cooking, sewing, and waited on us all."

— Vladimir Bakaleinikov: Notes of a Musician

«Мой отец зарабатывал очень мало. Мы, дети, помогали ему зарабатывать игрой на свадьбах, в ресторанах, давая уроки, впоследствии концертируя. Никакими видами труда мы, дети, не гнушались. Стыдно было не работать, видя, как наша мать на всех стирала, на всех готовила, всех обшивала и всем прислуживала.»

— Владимир Бакалейников: Записки Музыканта

Bakaleinikov entered the Moscow Conservatory at the age of nine, studying with Jan Hřímalý. After his graduation in 1907, he quickly gained a reputation as a gifted violist and chamber musician, playing with the Russian Musical Society in Moscow, the Mecklenburg Quartet (1910–1920) of Saint Petersburg, and later with the Stradivari Quartet (1920–1924) in Moscow. He was conductor of the Theatre of Musical Drama (Театр музыкальной драмы) in Saint Petersburg (1914–1916), and at the Music Studio of the Moscow Art Theatre (1920–1926). Simultaneously, Bakaleinikov was professor of viola at the Saint Petersburg Conservatory (1918–1920) and at the Moscow Conservatory (1920–1924). As professor of viola, Bakaleinikov was a pioneer in promoting artistic standards for the instrument. Among his students were, in particular, Vadim Borisovsky, who succeeded him as professor of viola at the conservatory.

In 1925–1926, Bakaleinikov, together with his wife, singer and actress Julia Fatova (Юлия Фатова; Yulia Fatova), went to the United States with the Moscow Art Theater Music Studio on a highly successful tour. At the invitation of the conductor Fritz Reiner, Bakaleinikov was appointed assistant conductor and principal violist of the Cincinnati Symphony Orchestra (1927–1937). In 1937, following the lead of his two younger brothers, he moved to Hollywood to work in film. He was also associate conductor of the Los Angeles Philharmonic. During this time, Bakaleinikov began conducting lessons with seven-year-old Lorin Maazel. In 1938, Bakaleinikov again accepted an invitation from Reiner, then principal conductor of the Pittsburgh Symphony Orchestra, to be his assistant. The Maazel family followed Bakaleinikov to Pittsburgh so that the young conductor could continue working with his teacher. Between Reiner's departure from Pittsburgh in 1948 and the arrival of his successor William Steinberg in 1952, Bakaleinikov served as musical director of the orchestra. Affectionately known as "Bak," he possessed a delightful sense of humor and loved to tell stories.

Bakaleinikov wrote Elementary Rules of Conducting for Orchestra, Band and Chorus (1938), a memoir Записки музыканта (Notes of a Musician) (1943), and composed a concerto for viola as well as chamber works.

Bakaleinikov was awarded the honorary title of Honored Artist of the RSFSR in 1924.

== Selected works ==
- Aria for viola and piano (1935)
- Concerto for viola and orchestra (1937)
- Gavotte for viola and piano (1937)
- Minuetto for viola and piano (1937)
- Scales and Studies for the Viola (1938)
- Allegro moderato for double bass and piano (1939)
- Canzona for horn and piano (1939)
- Cavatina for horn and piano (1939)
- A Danse [sic] for oboe and piano (1939)
- Elegy for oboe and piano (1939)
- Introduction and Scherzo for woodwind quintet (1939)
- Largo for double bass and piano (1939)
- Pastorale for oboe and piano (1939)
- Three Pieces for bassoon and piano (1939)

1. A Ballad
2. Humoresque
3. March eccentric

- Valse: Allegro grazioso for double bass and piano (1939)
- Polonaise for cornet (or B♭ trumpet) and piano (1940)
- Legend for cornet (or B♭ trumpet) and piano (1952)
- Serenade for cornet (or B♭ trumpet) and piano (1952)
- Andantino cantabile for trombone or baritone and piano (1953)
- Meditation for trombone or baritone and piano (1953)
- Valse triste for trombone or baritone and piano (1953)
- Symphonie miniature (1954?)

Literary

- Elementary Rules of Conducting, for Orchestra, Band and Chorus (Основные правила дирижирования оркестром, духовым оркестром и хором) (1938)
- The Instruments of the Band and Orchestra: An Encyclopedia, co-authored with Milton Rosen (1940)
- Записки музыканта (Zapiski muzykanta; Notes of a Musician) (1943)

== Discography ==
- Fritz Reiner Conducts Richard Strauss – Don Quixote; Vladimir Bakaleinikov (viola); Gregor Piatigorsky (cello); Fritz Reiner (conductor); Pittsburgh Symphony Orchestra; Biddulph BID 83067 (2000)
