= Alan Watts bibliography =

Lectures and books by Alan Watts

Alan Watts was an orator and philosopher of the 20th century. He spent time reflecting on personal identity and higher consciousness. According to the critic Erik Davis, his "writings and recorded talks still shimmer with a profound and galvanising lucidity." These works are not accessible in the same way as his many books.

== Books ==
- Watts, Alan W. (1932) An Outline of Zen Buddhism, London: Golden Vista Press.
- Watts, Alan W. (1936) The Spirit of Zen: A Way of Life, Work, and Art in the Far East, London: John Murray.
- Watts, Alan W. (1937) The Legacy of Asia and Western Man: A Study of the Middle Way, London: John Murray.
- Watts, Alan W. (1940) The Meaning of Happiness: The Quest for Freedom of the Spirit in Modern Psychology and the Wisdom of the East, New York: Harper and Row. (2nd ed.; 1968), New York: Harper and Row.
- Watts, Alan (1947) Behold the Spirit: A Study in the Necessity of Mystical Religion, London: John Murray. (2nd ed.; 1971), New York: Random House.
- Watts, Alan (1950) Easter: Its Story and Meaning, New York: H. Schuman.
- Watts, Alan (1950) The Supreme Identity: An Essay on Oriental Metaphysic and the Christian Religion New York: Pantheon Books. (2nd ed.; 1971), New York: Random House.
- Watts, Alan (1951) The Wisdom of Insecurity: A Message for an Age of Anxiety, New York: Pantheon Books.
- Watts, Alan (1953) Myth and Ritual in Christianity, London: Thames and Hudson. ISBN 0-8070-1375-7.
- Watts, Alan (1957) The Way of Zen, New York: Pantheon Books. ISBN 0-375-70510-4.
- Watts, Alan (1958) Nature, Man and Woman, New York: Pantheon Books.
- Watts, Alan (1959) Beat Zen, Square Zen, and Zen, San Francisco, CA: City Lights Books.
- Watts, Alan (1960) This Is It: And Other Essays on Zen and Spiritual Experience, New York: Pantheon Books. ISBN 0-394-71904-2.
- Watts, Alan (1961) Psychotherapy East and West, New York: Pantheon Books. ISBN 0-394-71609-4.
- Watts, Alan (1962) The Joyous Cosmology: Adventures in the Chemistry of Consciousness, New York: Pantheon Books.
- Watts, Alan (1963) The Two Hands of God: The Myths of Polarity New York: George Braziller.
- Watts, Alan (1964) Beyond Theology: The Art of Godmanship, New York: Pantheon Books. ISBN 0-394-71923-9.
- Watts, Alan (1966) The Book: On the Taboo Against Knowing Who You Are, New York: Pantheon Books. ISBN 0-679-72300-5.
- Watts, Alan (1967) Nonsense (illustrations by Greg Irons), San Francisco, CA: Stolen Paper Review Editions.
- Watts, Alan (1970) Does it Matter? Essays on Man’s Relation to Materiality, New York: Pantheon Books. ISBN 0-394-71665-5.
- Watts, Alan (1971) Erotic Spirituality: The Vision of Konarak (photographs by Eliot Elisofon), New York: Macmillan Publishing Co.
- Watts, Alan (1972) In My Own Way: An Autobiography 1915–1965, New York: Pantheon Books. ISBN 978-1577315841.
- Watts, Alan (1972) The Art of Contemplation: A Facsimile Manuscript with Doodles, New York: Pantheon Books.
- Watts, Alan (1973) Cloud-Hidden, Whereabouts Unknown: A Mountain Journal, New York: Pantheon Books. ISBN 0-394-71999-9.
- Watts, Alan (1975) Tao: The Watercourse Way (with Chungliang Al Huang), New York: Pantheon Books.

=== Translations ===
- Pseudo-Dionysius the Areopagite (1944) Theologia Mystica: Being the Treatise of Saint Dionysius pseudo-Areopagite on Mystical Theology, Together with the First and Fifth Epistles. Translated from the Greek and with an introduction by Alan W. Watts. West Park, NY: Holy Cross Press. (2nd ed.; 1971), Sausalito, CA: The Society for Comparative Philosophy.

=== Posthumous publications ===
- 1974 The Essence of Alan Watts, ed. Mary Jane Watts, Celestial Arts
- 1976 Essential Alan Watts, ed. Mark Watts,
- 1978 Uncarved Block, Unbleached Silk: The Mystery of Life
- 1979 Om: Creative Meditations, ed. Mark Watts
- 1982 Play to Live, ed. Mark Watts
- 1983 Way of Liberation: Essays and Lectures on the Transformation of the Self, ed. Mark Watts
- 1985 Out of the Trap, ed. Mark Watts
- 1986 Diamond Web, ed. Mark Watts
- 1987 The Early Writings of Alan Watts, ed. John Snelling, Dennis T. Sibley, and Mark Watts
- 1990 The Modern Mystic: A New Collection of the Early Writings of Alan Watts, ed. John Snelling and Mark Watts
- 1994 Talking Zen, ed. Mark Watts
- 1995 Become What You Are, Shambhala, expanded ed. 2003. ISBN 1-57062-940-4
- 1995 Buddhism: The Religion of No-Religion, ed. Mark Watts A preview from Google Books
- 1995 The Philosophies of Asia, ed. Mark Watts
- 1995 The Tao of Philosophy, ed. Mark Watts, edited transcripts, Tuttle Publishing, 1999. ISBN 0-8048-3204-8
- 1996 Myth and Religion, ed. Mark Watts
- 1997 Taoism: Way Beyond Seeking, ed. Mark Watts
- 1997 Zen and the Beat Way, ed. Mark Watts
- 1998 Culture of Counterculture, ed. Mark Watts
- 1999 Buddhism: The Religion of No-Religion, ed. Mark Watts, edited transcripts, Tuttle Publishing. ISBN 0-8048-3203-X
- 2000 Eastern Wisdom, ed. Mark Watts, MJF Books. ISBN 1-56731-491-0, three books in one volume: What is Zen?, What is Tao?, and An Introduction to Meditation (Still the Mind). Assembled from transcriptions of audio tape recordings made by his son Mark, of lectures and seminars given by Alan Watts during the last decade of his life.
- 2000 Still the Mind: An Introduction to Meditation, ed. Mark Watts, New World Library. ISBN 1-57731-214-7
- 2000 What Is Tao?, ed. Mark Watts, New World Library. ISBN 1-57731-168-X
- 2000 What Is Zen?, ed. Mark Watts, New World Library. ISBN 0-394-71951-4 A preview from Google Books
- 2002 Zen, the Supreme Experience: The Newly Discovered Scripts, ed. Mark Watts, Vega
- 2006 Eastern Wisdom, Modern Life: Collected Talks, 1960–1969, New World Library
- 2017 Collected Letters of Alan Watts, Ed. Joan Watts & Anne Watts, New World Library. ISBN 978-1608684151
- 2020 Just So: Money, Materialism, and the Ineffable, Intelligent Universe, Boulder, CO: Sounds True. ISBN 978-1683642947
- 2023 Tao for Now: Wisdom of the Watercourse ed. Mark Watts, edited transcripts, Waterside Productions, 2023. ISBN 978-1960583901

== Audio and Video Works, Lectures, and Essays ==
A complete list of Audio Works and Lectures can be found at the Official Alan Watts website.

Including recordings of lectures at major universities and multi-session seminars.

- 1960 Eastern Wisdom and Modern Life, television series, Season 1 (1959) and Season 2 (1960)
- 1960 Essential Lectures
- 1960 From Time to Eternity
- 1960 Lecture on Zen
- 1960 Nature of Consciousness (here)
- 1960 Taoism
- 1960 The Cross of Cards
- 1960 The Value of Psychotic Experience
- 1960 The World As Emptiness
- 1960. Studs Terkel interviews Alan Watts. Discussion on Zen Buddhism.
- 1962 Haiku (Long playing album - MEA LP 1001)
- 1962 This Is It - Alan Watts and friends in a spontaneous musical happening (Long playing album - MEA LP 1007)
- 1968 Psychedelics & Religious Experience, in California Law Review (here)
- 1968 Alan Watts interviews Laura Huxley. Radio Broadcast, Sausalito, CA: KPFA. Discussion on Aldous Huxley, the art of conscious dying and Jiddu Krishnamurti.
- 1969 Why Not Now: The Art of Meditation
- 1970: Radio interview. Studs terkel interviews Alan watts who discusses and reads from his book "In My Own Way".
- 1971 Alan Watts on Living, 5-part television miniseries produced in Vancouver by CBC Television, concerning his views on the detrimental nature of culture.
- 1971 A Conversation With Myself: Part 1 on YouTube, Part 2 on YouTube, Part 3 on YouTube, Part 4 on YouTube
- 1972 The Art of Contemplation, Village Press
- 1972 The Way of Liberation in Zen Buddhism, Alan Watts Journal, vol. 2, nr 1
- 1972: Radio Interview. Elliot Mintz in conversation with Alan watts.
- 1972: Radio interview. Alan reads from his auto biography "In My Own Way" and discusses his life and philosophy with Lex Hixon; host of “In the Spirit” on WBAI Radio.
- 1994 Zen: The Best of Alan Watts (VHS)
- 1998 Summer Of Love: The Spirituality And Consciousness Of The 1960s (Cassette)
- 2004 Out of Your Mind: Essential Listening from the Alan Watts Audio Archives, Sounds True, Inc. Unabridged edition,
- 2005 Do You Do It, or Does It Do You?: How to let the universe meditate you (CD)
- 2007 Zen Meditations with Alan Watts, DVD (here)
- 2013 What If Money Was No Object? (3 minutes) on YouTube
- 2015 Thusness (CD)
- 2016 "You Are The Universe" Youtube
- 2019 PY1 Multimedia Show py1.co
- 2021 'Delta Goodrem' 'PLAY' Bridge Over Troubled Dreams
- 2022 'The Art of Meditation', Sigur Ros & Formless
- 2022 'Accepted Too', Akira The Don

=== Biographical publications ===
- Stuart, David (pseudonym for Edwin Palmer Hoyt Jr.)(1976). Alan Watts: The Rise and Decline of the Ordained Shaman of the Counterculture. Chilton Book Co., Pa. ISBN 978-0801959653
- Lhermite, Pierre (1983) Alan Watts, Taoïste d'Occident, éd. La Table Ronde.
- Furlong, Monica (1986). Genuine Fake: A Biography of Alan Watts. Heinemann (or titled Zen Effects: The Life of Alan Watts as published by Houghton Mifflin Company, Boston, ISBN 0-395-45392-5).
