= Khutbat-e-Madras =

1936 book by Syed Sulaiman Nadvi

Khutbat-e-Madras (Urdu: خطباتِ مدراس) is a collection of eight sermons on the life of the Islamic prophet Muhammad by Syed Suleiman Nadvi, first published in 1936. Nadvi prepared the material for a non-Arab, non-Muslim audience. Syed gave these sermons in October and November 1925 at the request of Islami Taleemi Anjuman at Madras University.

== Translations ==
In 2017, an English translation of Khutbat-e-madras was produced by Professor Abdur Rahim Kidwai of Aligarh Muslim University and published by Pharos Media under the title of Prophet Muhammad – the Role Model as the first of a series of planned translations of the Urdu-language works of Syed Sulaiman Nadwi.
