= List of works by Dylan Thomas =

This is a list of the works by Welsh poet and writer Dylan Thomas.

== Poetry collections ==
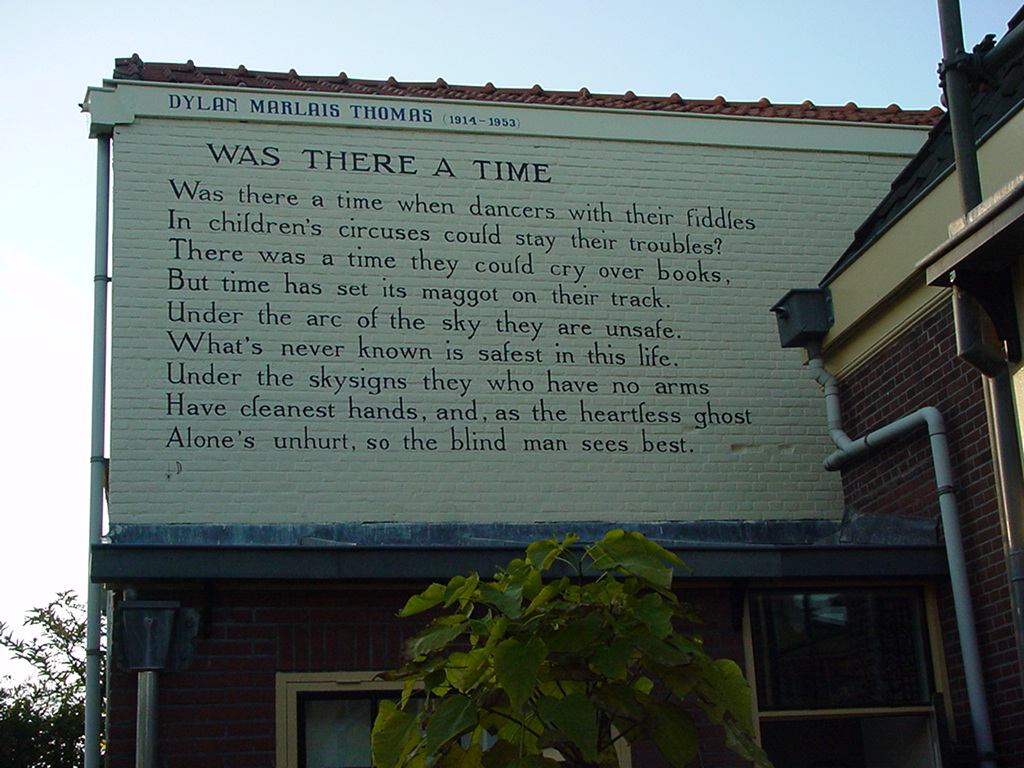
"Was there a time" as a wall poem in Leiden (first published in Twenty-Five Poems, 1936)

- 1934 18 Poems, The Sunday Referee; Parton Bookshop
- 1936 Twenty-Five Poems, Dent
- 1939 The Map of Love, Dent
- 1939 The World I Breathe, New Directions (selection of poems and short stories)
- 1943 New Poems, New Directions
- 1946 Deaths and Entrances, Dent
- 1949 Twenty-Six Poems, Dent
- 1952 In Country Sleep and Other Poems, New Directions
- 1952 Collected Poems, 1934–1952, Dent
- 2014 The Collected Poems of Dylan Thomas: The New Centenary Edition, Weidenfeld and Nicolson

== Prose works ==
- 1940 Portrait of the Artist as a Young Dog, Dent
- 1941 The Death of the King's Canary (with John Davenport, posthumously published) Dent 1976
- 1946 Selected Writings of Dylan Thomas, New Directions
- 1953 Adventures in the Skin Trade and Other Stories (Adventures in the Skin Trade, an unfinished novel), New Directions
- 1954 Quite Early One Morning (planned by Thomas, posthumously published by New Directions)
- 1955 A Child's Christmas in Wales, New Directions
- 1955 A Prospect of the Sea and Other Stories and Prose Writings, Dent
- 1957 Letters to Vernon Watkins, Dent
- 1965 Rebecca's Daughters, Triton
- 1970 Twelve More Letters, Turret (limited edition of 175)

== Documentaries ==
All produced through Strand Films for the Ministry of Information. Thomas was script writer on all these documentaries and commentator on These are the Men and Our Country.

- 1942 The Conquest of a Germ
- 1942 These are the Men
- 1942 This is Colour
- 1942 New Towns for Old
- 1942 Balloon Site 586
- 1943 Green Mountain, Black Mountain
- 1943 Our Country
- 1943 Is Your Ernie Really Necessary
- 1943 Where are They Now?

== Drama ==
- 1954 Under Milk Wood (Radio play)
- 1953 The Doctor and the Devils and Other Scripts

== Screenplays ==
- 1948 No Room at the Inn (with Ivan Foxwell, adapted from the 1945 play by Joan Birt)
- 1948 The Three Weird Sisters (with Louise Birt, adapted from the novel The Case of the Weird Sisters by Charlotte Armstrong)
- 1948 Rebecca's Daughters (produced posthumously)
- 1953 The Doctor and the Devils
- 1964 The Beach at Falesa
- 1964 Twenty Years a-Growing (unfinished)

== Collections ==
- 1963 Miscellany One: Poems, stories, broadcasts, Everyman Ltd, Reprint edition, ISBN 978-0460020138
- 1971 Miscellany Two: Including A Visit to Grandpa's and other stories and poems, Aldine, paperback / softback edition, ISBN 978-0460020497
- 1978 Miscellany Three: Poems, Stories, C Nicholls & Company, ISBN 978-0460011082
- 1982 Selected Works, Guild Publishing, London
- 1984 The Collected Stories of Dylan Thomas, New Directions Publishing
- 1986 Collected Letters, ed. Paul Ferris, MacMillan
- 1991 Dylan Thomas: The Broadcasts, ed. Ralph Maud. London: Dent
- 1994 Eight Stories, W. W. Norton & Co
- 1995 Dylan Thomas: The Complete Screenplays, ed. John Ackerman, Applause Books
- 1997 Fern Hill: An Illustrated edition of the Dylan Thomas poem. Red Deer College Press, Canada
- 2000 Collected Poems 1934–1953, London: Phoenix
- 2000 Selected Poems, London: Phoenix

== Illustrated ==
- 1971 The Outing illustrated by Meg Stevens, London: Dent (1985 edition illustrated by cartoonist Paul Cox, London: Dent)
- 1978 A Child's Christmas in Wales illustrated by Edward Ardizzone, London: Dent (1996: re-published as Dolphin Paperback from Orion Children's Books)

== Audio recordings ==
- Dylan Thomas: Volume I — A Child's Christmas in Wales and Five Poems (Caedmon TC 1002–1952)
- Under Milk Wood (Caedmon TC 2005–1953)
- Dylan Thomas: Volume II — Selections from the Writings of Dylan Thomas (Caedmon TC 1018–1954)
- Dylan Thomas: Volume III — Selections from the Writings of Dylan Thomas (Caedmon TC 1043)
- Dylan Thomas: Volume IV — Selections from the Writings of Dylan Thomas (Caedmon TC 1061)
- Dylan Thomas: Quite early one morning and other memories (Caedmon TC 1132–1960)
- Dylan Thomas: Under Milk Wood and other plays (Naxos Audiobooks NA288712 – 2008) (originally BBC – 1954)

[See details on French Wikipédia's article here : Dylan Thomas / Discographie].
