= Murzynek Bambo =

Poem by Polish author Julian Tuwim

- by Julian Tuwim
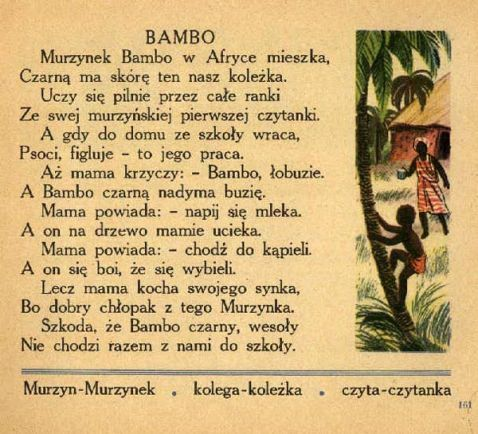
- Original title: Bambo
- Written: 1934
- Country: Poland
- Language: Polish
- Publisher: Wiadomości Literackie
- Publication date: 1935
- Metre: Couplet

Murzynek Bambo (Bambo the little negro) is a children's poem by Polish-Jewish author Julian Tuwim (September 1894 – December 1953), written in 1934, which tells a story of a fictitious African child named Bambo. Tuwim's poem, which was said to have been written to promote tolerance toward other ethnicities during interwar Poland, is now seen by some as highly controversial, with critics accusing the author of perpetuating harmful racial stereotypes.

== Analysis and controversy ==
=== Historical context ===
The poem is sixteen lines long, arranged in eight rhyming couplets. It is said to have been written by Tuwim to teach Polish youth tolerance towards Black children, suggesting they are not different from their Polish counterparts. Historians note that Tuwim, who faced strong anti-Semitic sentiments during the interwar period, opposed Polish nationalist politics and its discrimination against ethnic minorities. According to Jakub Wojas, Tuwim was widely known for his anti-nationalist and anti-racist views.

=== The meaning of Murzynek ===
The poem refers to Bambo as murzynek, the diminutive form of Murzyn. Murzynek can be translated into English in a variety of ways, such as 'little black child'. The word Murzyn, which historically had not been considered offensive, has come to be seen as increasingly discriminatory and derogatory in a process of semantic change during the 21st century. The word was derived from borrowing the German word Mohr, which derived from Latin maurus, similar to the English word 'moor'.

=== Accusations of racism ===
In the 21st century, Murzynek Bambo has been accused of racism and of presenting a culturally and socio-economically demeaning view of Africans. Writer Patrycja Pirog notes that the poem is a "story of an enlightened Europe trying to civilize a savage" which, despite its seemingly innocuous nature, perpetuates harmful primitivist stereotypes of European colonialism and contributes to promoting racist attitudes toward Black people in contemporary Poland. In the opinion of Margaret Ohia, who researched racism in the Polish language at the University of California, the protagonist of the poem is presented as inferior to the presumably white reader. The phrase Murzynek Bambo is often used in children's name-calling when the target is a black child.

Other Polish critics contend that the contemporary claims of the poem's seeming racism are exaggerated and anachronistic. Referencing Alan Gribben's controversial attempt to expurgate Mark Twain's Tom Sawyer and Adventures of Huckleberry Finn, conservative journalist Adam Kowalczyk dismisses the notion that Murzynek Bambo promotes racism in Poland. A reader of Gazeta Wyborcza, a major liberal newspaper in Poland, Ewa Trzeszczkowska, describes in a letter how she identifies with Bambo: "For me, this work was and is a cheerful story about a naughty boy from a distant, exotic country, that, although so distant – both the country and the boy – is also similar to me. He has a joy of life which is expressed, amongst other ways, in the climbing of the trees (I climbed them too), and has a slight note of defiance, independence, liberty. Which was and is close to me!" She writes that she does not suspect "the author of these words of bad intentions", though she admits feeling discomfort reading that Bambo fears baths because he might become white. The linguist Katarzyna Kłosińska has described Murzynek Bambo as incorporating offensive and overtly racialised stereotypes in its depiction of Africans. However, she has questioned how attuned to such tropes the poem's readers may historically have been, comparing the work to such contemporary depictions of Indians, Native Americans and Gorals by Kornel Makuszyński, for example.

== Text ==
A little Moor boy Bambo lives in Africa.
Our little friend has black skin.

He studies all morning
His 'Moor's First Textbook of Reading Skills'

And when he returns home from school,
He plays pranks, tricks — it's his job.

Even mom cries, 'Bambo, you little rascal!'
And Bambo puffs his little black cheeks.

Mom says, 'Drink some milk'
But he runs away from mom up a tree.

Mom says, 'Let's take a bath'
But he is afraid that he will wash out and whiten.

But mom loves her little son,
Because this little Moor is a good boy.

It's just a pity that this cheerful, black, little Bambo
Does not go to school with us.

== See also ==
- Little Black Sambo
- Washing the Ethiopian White
