= Sleeping Lady with Black Vase =

Painting by Róbert Berény

- Alvó nő fekete vázával (Hungarian)
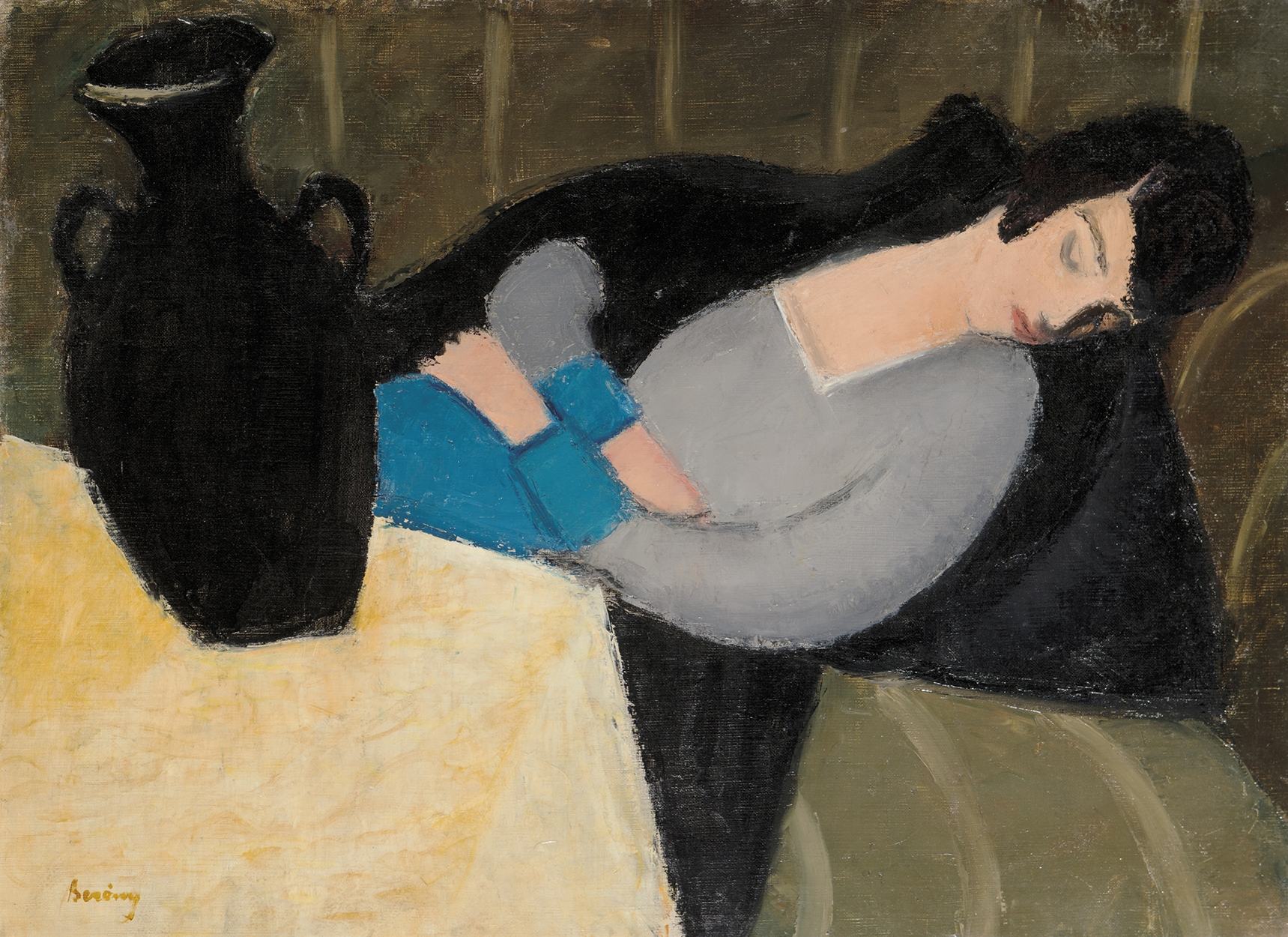
- Artist: Róbert Berény
- Year: 1927–1928
- Medium: Oil on canvas
- Subject: Eta Berény
- Dimensions: 64 cm × 87 cm (25 in × 34 in)
- Location: Private collection

Sleeping Lady with Black Vase (Hungarian: Alvó nő fekete vázával) is a 1927–1928 oil painting by Róbert Berény. It is a depiction of the painter's wife reclining asleep in a blue dress behind a table on which is set a black vase. The painting was sold in 1928 and was considered lost after World War II.

It was auctioned as a Berény in the mid-1990s and, with the artist's work valued cheaply at this time, was later sold to Sony Pictures, who used it in the 1999 film Stuart Little as set dressing in the house of the main character. In 2009, art historian Gergely Barki identified the painting while watching the film with his daughter, and tracked it down. It was owned by a set designer, who sold it to an art collector, who sold it at auction in 2014 for $285,700.

== Description ==
The painting is a portrait of Berény's second wife, Eta (née Breuer) and is made in the art deco style. It has been described as among Berény's best work. The sleeping subject wears a typical 1920s hair style and a blue dress. She reclines away from a table on which a black vase is set. It is painted in oil on a canvas in landscape orientation measuring 64 by 87 centimetres (25 in × 34 in). It is signed by the artist in the lower left.

Art historian Judit Virág describes Sleeping Lady with Black Vase as a "perfect" representation of 1920s European art incorporating elements of contemporary French, German, and Russian art trends.

== History ==
=== Early history ===
Berény is likely to have painted Sleeping Lady with Black Vase from 1927 to 1928, by which time he had returned to Budapest, in his native Hungary, from Berlin where he had fled following World War I. The painting was last seen in public in 1928 when it exhibited at the Ernst Museum before being sold. The buyer is likely to have been Jewish and left the country in the lead up to or during World War II. Hungary was turbulent during this period and the painting was considered lost.

=== Rediscovery ===
The painting was sold for $40 at a charity auction at the St Vincent de Paul auction house in San Diego in the mid-1990s to art collector Michael Hempstead. He sold it to an antique store in Pasadena, California, for $400, which was the going rate for a Berény at the time. The painting was purchased from the store by a set designer, on behalf of Sony Pictures, for $500. In 1999, Hempstead recognised the painting in the film Stuart Little, in which it was used as set dressing in the background of shots inside the main character's house. Hempstead considered tracking the painting down and buying it back, knowing that prices for Berény works had increased since he had sold it. In addition to Stuart Little, the painting was also featured in a number of soap opera episodes, including some of Family Law. The set designer later purchased the painting from the film company to hang in her house.

On 24 December 2009, Hungarian National Gallery researcher and art historian Gergely Barki recognised the painting whilst watching Stuart Little at home with his three-year-old daughter. Barki recognised the painting from a 1928 black-and-white photograph he had seen. As he had no recording software, he was unable to pause or playback the sections with the painting, but it was shown frequently during the film. Barki believed that the painting was unlikely to be a print or copy as it was not well-known. Barki sent 40–50 emails to different production companies and crew members in an attempt to track down the painting. After two years, he received a response from the set designer who owned it. Barki was invited to travel to the United States, where it hung in the set designer's house, to confirm its identity. Barki met the set designer in a park in Washington, D.C., and, after unscrewing the frame with a screwdriver borrowed from a hotdog vendor, was able to confirm the painting was genuine.

Ultimately, the set designer sold the work to an art collector, who put it up for auction in December 2014. The painting was listed with a reserve of $121,220 and was sold on 13 December to an unnamed Hungarian collector for $285,700. Because of the publicity generated by its unusual rediscovery, it has been described as the most widely known Hungarian painting.
