= Dimitri Arakishvili =

Georgian composer and ethnomusicologist

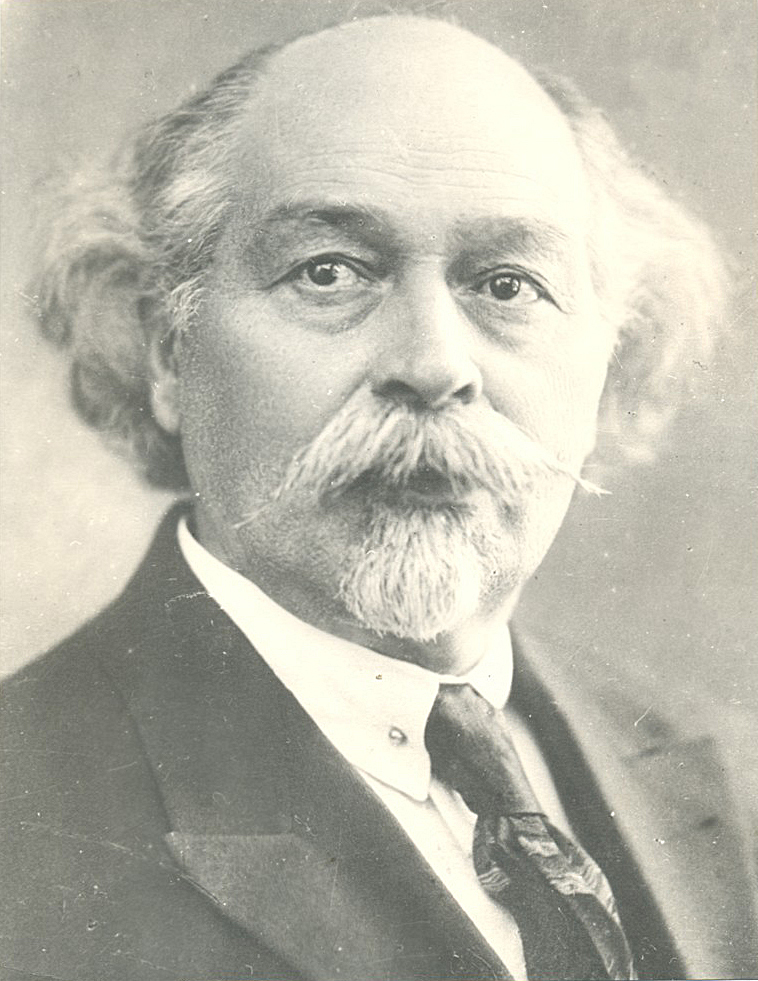
Arakishvili in 1930s

Dimitri Arakishvili (Georgian: დიმიტრი არაყიშვილი; 11 February 1873 – 13 August 1953) was a Soviet and Georgian composer and ethnomusicologist who is considered one of the founding fathers of modern Georgian music. He was also known by his Russified name Dimitry Ignatyevich Arakchiev (Russian: Димитрий Игнатьевич Аракчиев).

Born in Vladikavkaz, Terek Oblast, Russian Empire (now North Ossetia, Russia), he graduated, in 1901, from the School of Music and Drama operated by Moscow Philharmonic Society where he was tutored by Alexander Gretchaninov and Willem Kes. In addition he graduated from the Moscow Archaeological Institute in 1917. He helped found the Moscow People's Conservatory and offered free musical classes in Arbat Square in 1906. From 1908 to 1912, was editor-in-chief of the journal Muzika i zhizn. One of his major interests was Georgian folk music and he traveled throughout Georgia collecting traditional music and over 500 folk songs from 1901 to 1908. When Georgia established an independent republic in 1918, Arakishvili moved to Tbilisi and founded a conservatory which was merged with the Tbilisi State Conservatoire in 1923. He taught and composed, and directed the Conservatory from 1926 to 1929. He was actively involved in collecting and popularizing Georgian folk songs and published books on Georgian folk music. Since 1932, he chaired the Union of Georgian Composers. In 1950, he was awarded the Stalin Prize. He died on 13 August 1953.

== Selected works ==
- The Legend of Shota Rustaveli 1919
