= Malek Bennabi =

Algerian philosopher

- مالك بن نبي
- A prominent Algerian thinker.
- Born: 1 January 1905; Constantine, French Algeria
- Died: 31 October 1973 (aged 68); Algiers, Algeria
- Other name: Seddik Bennabi
- Occupations: Political philosopher, writer, speaker, university lecturer, theologian.

Philosophical work
- Main interests: primarily-the reconciliation of Islamism with nationalism, also civilizational cycle, problem of culture (empirical and civilizational culture), historical movement, problem of ideas, conditions of a renaissance, globalization, economics.

Malek Bennabi (1 January 1905 – 31 October 1973) (Arabic: مالك بن نبي, romanized: Malik ibn Nabī) was an Algerian writer and philosopher, of Islamic, Salafist and Wahhabi inspiration who wrote about human society, particularly Muslim society with a focus on the reasons behind the fall of Muslim civilization and the keys for Renaissance.

According to Malek Bennabi, the lack of new ideas in Islamic thought emerged what he coined civilizational bankruptcy. He argued that in order to recover its former magnificence, Islamic society had to become an environment in which individuals felt empowered. In order to satisfy his spiritual and material needs, a Muslim needed to feel that his industry and creativity would find reward.

== Education ==
Bennabi was born in Constantine, Algeria in 1905. Educated in Paris and Algiers in engineering, he later based himself in Cairo, where he spent much of his time working extensively in the fields of history, philosophy and sociology. In 1963, after returning to Algeria, he witnessed modern scientific inventions and technological creations unfold before his eyes. This spurred him to reflect on the question of culture in the early nineteenth century. His approach was simple, not parroting what had been discovered before his time, but rather, searching for what constitutes the essence of culture and the birth of civilization.

Following his return to Algeria, Bennabi helped establish El Qiyam al-Islamiyya ("Islamic Values"), an association dedicated to promoting Islamic values in post-independence Algerian society. The movement advocated a greater role for Islam in public life and brought together religious scholars and reformist intellectuals. Although historians differ on the extent of its influence, El Qiyam is generally regarded as an important precursor of later Algerian Islamist movements. The association was banned by the Algerian authorities in 1966 and formally dissolved in 1970.

== Work ==
From one of his works, Les Conditions de la Renaissance (1948), he defined culture as the mode of being and becoming of a people. This included aesthetic, ethical, pragmatic, and technical values. When these contents had been clearly defined, only then could various formulations of ideas be born. The birth of new ideas led to a dynamic society furthering the movement of vibrancy of a new civilization. In another book, The Question of Culture (1954), he said, the organisation of society, its life and movement, indeed, its deterioration and stagnation, all possessed a functional relation with the system of ideas found in that society. If that system were to change in one way or another, all other social characteristics would follow suit and adapt in the same direction. Ideas, as a whole, form an important part of the means of development in a given society. The various stages of development in such a society are indeed different forms of its intellectual developments. If one of those stages corresponds to what is called "renaissance", it will mean that society at that stage is enjoying a wonderful system of ideas; a system that can provide a suitable solution to each of the vital problems in that particular society. He added that ideas influence the life of a given society in two different ways; either they are factors of growth of social life, or on the contrary, the role of factors of contagion, thus rendering social growth rather difficult or even impossible.

== Views ==
His primary focus was on the term he coined called 'Post-Almohad Men'. Modern society had left this man hollow due to a stultifying lack of aspiration. He said that in the nineteenth century, the relations among nations were based on power for the position of a nation was dependent on the number of its factories, cannons, fleets and gold reserves. However, the twentieth century introduced a new development in which ideas were held in high esteem as national and international values. This development has not been strongly felt in many underdeveloped countries, for their inferiority complex created a warped infatuation with the criteria of power that was based on material things. Muslims living in an underdeveloped country often felt that they were inferior to people living in a developed country. As a result of this inferiority, Muslims ascribed this distance to the field of objects. They assessed their situation as an abomination caused by the lack of weapons, aeroplanes and banks. Thus, their inferiority complex, based on social efficacy, would lead only to pessimism on the psychological level. On the social level, it would lead to what we have elsewhere called takdis (heaping-up). To turn this feeling into an effective driving-force, Muslims needed to ascribe their backwardness to the level of ideas, not to that of "objects", for the development of the new world depended increasingly on ideas and other such intellectual criteria. In underdeveloped countries, which were still within the sphere of influence of the superpowers, arms and oil revenues were no longer sufficient to support that influence. The world had, therefore, entered a stage at which most of its problems could be solved only by certain systems of ideas. Therefore, the Arabs and other Muslim countries, especially those that did not possess a great deal of material power, should give more weight to the issue of ideas.

He later criticised the Muslim society for frequently falling into an apologetic state. Muslims tended to dig up past treasures instead of seeking to progress with new ones. He said that Muslims today were in a state of disarray. Muslim countries and societies were largely imperialized by the West. This was truly not a failure of Islam, but because Muslims and those in governance abandoned the true understanding of what Islamic values connoted. In this, Bennabi again pointed out, "after Egypt's humiliation in the Six-Day War in June 1967, it is the ummah's (global Muslim community) understanding and worldview, its stock of ideas rather than of arms and ammunition's, that needs to be renewed. Although looking back to what had been achieved in the Golden Age of Islam is still relevant, what is more important is to be able to appreciate the political values and culture of models and systems implemented by past prophets, reinterpret and apply these to our contemporary society. Enriching the society is part of dynamism in Islam. Colonisation of minds has driven Muslims towards a state of moral and psychological decay. Bennabi also mused about the ‘century of the woman, the Jew and the dollar’ as two threats to the larger Muslim world. He believed that moral paralysis resulted in intellectual paralysis.

Bennabi's writing influenced many thinkers and writers including the former Acting Director General Head of Al Jazeera Media Network, Mostefa Souag who quoted Bennabi in the 25th AJ anniversary commemorative flip book.

== A theory in social change ==
In his book, Bases of Civilization, Malek Bennabi put his theory of social change. He argues that we can split any given civilization into three basic elements: Man, soil (raw material) and time. This, then, becomes known as the civilization equation which he puts in this simple form: civilization = Man + soil + time. Renaissance in any society, Bennabi argues, requires a synthesis between these three essential elements. In studying many civilizations throughout the written history, Bennabi concludes that every civilization starts with a moral system which usually has its roots in some religious foundation. In the light of his theory, he explained how many social movements failed by missing the importance of moral reformation while focusing mainly and for most on the practical means. An example he gave is the Algerian revolution in that thinkers and religious leaders switched their attention to the ballot boxes which they wrongly thought as if it works as a magic wand that heals all their ethical and thinking problems.

== Bennabi in the archives of the intelligence services (DST) and the Court of Justice of Chartres (France) ==
Some groups which are hostile to Bennabi have alleged that he was a Nazi collaborator. His wife, Paulette Bennabi, was also accused by the French security service (DST) of acting for the Gestapo of Dreux (France), under the alias "Madame Mille". The Bennabi couple were the subject of several investigations by the DST and were imprisoned at the Pithiviers camp for 18 months, between 1944 and 1946. The accusations stem from Bennabi being offered a full-time job in a Muslim section of Jacques Doriot's French Popular Party (PPF).

In a book announced by the Parisian publisher Erick Bonnier in October 2019, Zidane Meriboute (a former researcher-teacher at SOAS, University of London) "has conducted his own investigation to establish the truth about the activities of Bennabi's 'spouses' during the Second World War "; his book is based essentially on the archives of the DST and the French Court of Justice (Chartres and Paris Archives), hitherto kept in absolute secrecy. Extensive extracts from DST files and recitals of the Court of Justice of Chartres are included for the first time in this book, which was published in March 2020. The recitals of the Chartres Court of Justice's ruling of 6 April 1946 cleared Mr and Mrs Bennabi of all suspicion, the judge having concluded that "the accused were detained for many months on fanciful charges - nothing of which could be retained".

== Bibliography (Partial list) ==
- Zidane Meriboute, Malek Bennabi - Père du courant islamique mondial ? Éditions Erick Bonnier, Paris 2020, 140 p.
- Walsh Sebastian,'Killing Post-Almohad Man: Malek Bennabi, Algerian Islamism and the Search for a Liberal Governance', The Journal of North African Studies, Volume 12, 2007.
- Bennabi and Malek. 1954. 'Vocation de l'Islam'. Islamic Studies, 24: 455–92. trans.
- Burgat, François and Dowell, William. 1993. 'The Islamic Movement in North Africa', Edited by: Burgat, François and Dowell, William. Austin, TX: University of Texas
- Les conditions de la renaissance (Conditions of a Renaissance)
- Vocation de l'Islam (Vocation of Islam)
- Le problème des idées dans le monde musulman (Problem of Ideas in Muslim World)
- Le phénomène coranique (The Quranic Phenomenon)
- Lebbeik (First and only novel that attracted interest of French filmmakers, due to the seductions and attractions he received, the writer decided no more to involve in novelry, but to engage himself for noble causes)
- La lutte idéologique (The Ideological Struggle in Third World Countries)
- L'Afro-asiatisme (Afro-asiatisme)
- Islam et Démocratie (Islam and Democracy)
- Dans le souffle de la bataille.( Within the breath of the battle)
- S.O.S Algérie (Save Algeria)
- Idée d'un commonwealth islamique (An Idea of Islamic Commonwealth)
- Naissance d'une société (Birth of a Society)
- Perspectives Algérienne (Algerian Prescriptives)
- Mémoires d'un témoin du siècle, tome1 et tome2
- Le rôle du musulman dans le dernier tiers du 20ème siècle
- Le role du musulman dans le monde de l'economie (The Role of the Muslim in the world of economy)
- Le livre et le milieu humain(inedit 2006)(Book and Human Milieu)
- l'Oeuvre des orientalistes (The Result of Orientalists)
- Contemplations (Reflections)
- Le Musulman dans le Monde de l'Economie
- Memoires d'un temoin du siecle, 2 first volumes (the Child, The Student
- Memoires d'un temoin du siecle, 4 with two added unpublished volumes (The Writer and Notes)

Malek Bennabi wrote more than 25 books, all his works were written between 1946 (The Quranic Phenomenon) and 1973. Yet, due to Mr.X whom he calls the imperialist enemies, many of his works are ceased from being published, some were lost or censored.
