= The Legend of Shota Rustaveli =

The Legend of Shota Rustaveli (Georgian: თქმულება შოთა რუსთაველზე, romanized: tkmuleba shota rustavelze) is a 1904 Georgian-language opera about the 12th-century poet Shota Rustaveli by Dimitri Arakishvili; it premiered at Tbilisi Opera House in 1919.

== Recordings ==
- Aria "Madloba Gmerts" (Thanks be to God), Lado Ataneli (baritone), Württembergische Philharmonie Reutlingen, conducted by Lodovico Zocche
- Cavatina of Queen Tamar, Anita Rachvelishvili, Orchestra Sinfonica di Torino della RAI, conducted by Giacomo Sagripanti
