= Oda al Gato =

Poem by Pablo Neruda

"Oda al Gato" ("Ode to the Cat") is a poem by the Chilean poet and Nobel laureate, Pablo Neruda. It was first published in his 1959 collection Navegaciones y regresos (Voyages and Homecomings, Losada, Buenos Aires). Navegaciones y regresos is the fourth of Neruda's books of odes, after Odas elementales, Nuevas odas elementales, and Tercer libro de las odas. Almost all of these odes address everyday subjects, such as conger eel soup, a happy day, the sea, tomatoes, wine, and onions. "Oda al Gato" compares the cat with other imperfect animals, depicting its nature as complete, proud, and unknowable.

The poem has been translated by many scholars, including Ken Krabbenhoft. It has been performed in Jazz music festivals and was used in the Poetry in Motion project in New York City, where poetry was displayed in public trains and buses in spaces normally reserved for commercial advertisements.
