= Babu Gulabrai =

Indian writer (1888–1963)

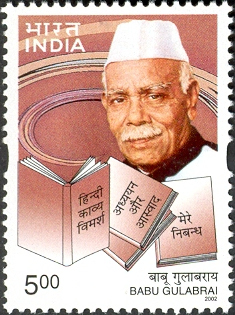
- Born: 17 January 1888; Jalesar, North-Western Provinces, British India
- Died: 13 April 1963 (aged 75); Agra, Uttar Pradesh, India
- Website: www.babugulabrai.in

Babu Gulabrai (17 January 1888 – 13 April 1963) was a significant figure in modern Hindi literature.

== Biography ==
Babu Gulabrai was born in Etawah, where his father, Babu Bhawani Prasad, was a munsarif in the judicial court. His mother was Gomati Devi. He spent his early life at Mainpuri.

Gulabrai completed his MA in philosophy from St. John's College, Agra and his LLB from Agra college, both affiliated to Allahabad University at that time. He started writing philosophical essays in English and switched to Hindi in order to promote it as a national language. His first two works, Shanti Dharma and Maitri Dharma, reflected his ideology and interests.

He then worked for the Maharaja of Chhatarpur as a philosophical companion, private secretary, Deewan(prime minister) and chief justice. After the death of the Maharaja, he returned to Agra and resumed writing. He taught at St John's College, Agra, and was noted for his teaching skills as well as his cordial attitude towards students.

He was conferred with an honorary doctorate from Agra University in the year 1957 by V. V. Giri, the then vice president of India. He continued writing until his death on 13 April (Baisakhi) 1963

Babu Gulabrai was married to Bhagwati Devi of Meerut. He had three sons and five daughters. His youngest son Shri Vinod Shanker Gupta has been a writer who wrote many books on Hindi literature along with his memoirs.

In June 2002, the Government of India issued a 5 Rs postal stamp to commemorate his contribution to Hindi literature.

== Literary works ==
Gulabrai wrote a history of Hindi literature, Hindi sahitya ka subodh itihaas and developed a unique style of self-satire, which is very prominent in his biographies titled Meri Asafaltaein and Thalua Club. He also started a literary magazine called Sahitya Sandesh.

His works can be broadly divided into three categories.

- Philosophical. Most of his early work comes into this category. As he was a philosopher by education as well as profession (his work in the court of the maharaja included him being a "philosophical companion" of the king). He was greatly inspired by the Gandhian philosophy and many of his works provide an analytical as well as scientific defence of it. Rashtriyata, which is a compilation of essays on nationalism, is one of the most mature and rationalistic descriptions of nationalism. He advocated the principle of harmony between internationalism, nationalism and regionalism, giving priority to them in this order.
- Literary essays. He was a prominent Hindi critic of Dwivedi and Shukla Yuga during the early half of the 20th century, which was the golden age of Hindi literature. He, along with the likes of Mahaveer Prasad Dwivedi and Acharya Ramchandra Shukla, gave the form a much-needed philosophical and analytical impetus.
- Satire. His output as a satirist include the most famous of his works that were produced in the later part of his life. His autobiography, Meri Asafaltain ("my Failures") was one of these and in it he made himself an object of humour and entertained the reader with an account of the failures of his life.

== Language ==
The language used by him was Sanskritized version of Hindi. His initial works were in English and he himself admits that he started writing in Hindi due to patriotic reasons and his knowledge of Sanskrit helped him in that. Hence we find heavy usage of Sanskrit words and shlokas. Unlike other essayist and critics of his time, he always tried to make his work simple (but analytical) and accessible to all which gained him much of the popularity.

There are several schools that have been named after his name. Few of them are following:

1. Shri Gulab Rai Montessori School, Bareilly. From Class KG to V. This school is affiliated to CBSE board, Delhi.
2. Shri Gulab Rai Montessori Senior Secondary School, Bareilly. From Class VI to XII. This school is affiliated to CBSE board, Delhi.
3. Shri Gulab Rai Inter College, Bareilly. From Class VI to XII. This school is affiliated to UP board, Allahabad.

== Books ==
Books written by him:

शांति धर्म – 1913
मैत्री धर्म – 1913
कर्तव्य शास्त्र – 1915
तर्क शाास्त्र – 1916
पाश्चात्य दर्शनों का इतिहास – 1917
फिर निराशा क्यों – 1918
नवरस – 1933
प्रबंध प्रभाकर – 1933
निबंध रत्नाकर – 1934
विज्ञान विनोद – 1937
हिंदी साहित्य का सुबोध इतिहास – 1940
हिन्दी साहित्य का संक्षिप्त इतिहास – 1943
मेरी असफलताएँ – 1946
सिद्धांत और अध्ययन – 1946
काव्य के रूप – 1947
हिंदी काव्य विमर्श – 1947
साहित्य समीक्षा – 1947
हिंदी नाट्य विमर्श – 1947
भारतीय संस्कृति की रूप रेखा – 1952
गांधीय मार्ग – 1953
मन की बाते – 1954
अभिनव भारत के प्रकाश स्तम्भ – 1955
सत्य और स्वतंत्रता के उपासक – 1955
कुछ उथले कुछ गहरे – 1955
मेरे निबंध – 1955
जीवन पथ – 1954
अध्ययन और अस्वाद – 1956
विद्यार्थी जीवन – 1956
हिंदी कविता और रहस्यवाद – 1956
