= Elisabeth Kuyper =

Dutch composer and conductor (1877–1953)

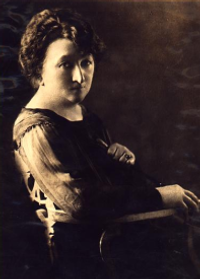

Background information
- Born: 13 September 1877; Amsterdam, Netherlands
- Died: 26 February 1953 (aged 75) Muzzano, Ticino, Switzerland
- Genres: Classical
- Occupations: Composer; conductor

Elisabeth Johanna Lamina Kuyper (13 September 1877 – 26 February 1953) was a Dutch Romantic composer and conductor.

== Life ==
Elisabeth Kuyper was born in Amsterdam, the eldest of three children. At the age of twelve, she began the formal study of music at the Maatschappij tot Bevordering der Toonkunst with Antoon Averkamp, Louis Coenen, and Daniel de Lange. She began composing at an early age, including a piano sonata and a prelude and fugue, which she performed for her diploma examination in 1895, and a one-act opera that was performed in Amsterdam in 1895. She moved to Berlin in 1896 to continue her composition studies with Heinrich Barth and Leopold Carl Wolff at the Hochschule für Musik, completing her studies there in 1900.

In 1901, Kuyper became the first woman to be admitted to study composition at the Meisterschule für Komposition, led by Max Bruch. She was quite productive as a composer during her master classes with Bruch, including creating a violin sonata, a ballad for cello and orchestra, and a serenade for orchestra. Max Bruch became a great champion of and mentor to Kuyper, and they stayed connected even through his very old age. He conducted many of her compositions, recommended her for stipends from the Dutch government, and even helped her obtain German citizenship.

In 1902, A. A. Noske of Middelburg became the first to publish one of Kuyper's compositions: her Sonata for Violin and Piano, which she dedicated to P. W. Janssen. The debut performance of the sonata was on July 18, 1902, at a music festival in the city of Nijmegen, with Elisabeth Kuyper on the piano and Marie Hekker on the violin.

On October 1, 1905, Elisabeth Kuyper became the first woman composer to be awarded the Mendelssohn Prize. She then composed perhaps her best known and most played work, the Violin Concerto in B Minor, opus 10. The piece premiered on February 13, 1908 with the Hochschule orchestra conducted by a 70-year-old Max Bruch. In April 1908, she became the first woman to be appointed as a professor of Composition and Theory at the Hochschule für Musik. Her students included Hildegard Quiel.

Because of the challenges Kuyper faced during her career, she became strongly connected with the women’s liberation movement of the period. Other than possible soloist performances, professional opportunities for female musicians were extremely limited, as no major orchestras of the time employed female musicians. Kuyper took great effort to bring change this situation. In 1908 she formed a women's choir at the Lyceum Club. In 1910 she formed and conducted the Berlin Women Musicians' Orchestra. For the convention of the International Council of Women held in The Hague in 1922, Kuyper assembled an orchestra and choir and led them in the performance of her Festival Cantata. After which, and with the encouragement of Lady Ishbel Aberdeen, Kuyper moved to London in 1923, where she founded the London Women's Symphony Orchestra. In 1924 she founded the American Women's Symphony Orchestra in New York City. In 1925 Kuyper returned to Europe and her teaching position at the Hochschule für Musik in Berlin, then retired to Switzerland. She died in the town of Muzzano, in the Lugano district of Switzerland.

== Works ==
Selected works include:

- Opus 1, Violin Sonata in A major
- Opus 8, Serenade for Orchestra, in D minor
- Opus 10, Concerto for Violin and Orchestra, in B minor
- Opus 11, Ballade for Cello and Orchestra, in G minor
- Opus 13, Trio for Violin, Cello and Piano, in D major
- Opus 17, Six Songs for Voice and Piano
- Serenata Ticinese in A major

== Discography ==
- Kuyper, Rediscovering a Dutch Master (Feminae Records, 2014)
  - Sonata in A Major for Violin and Piano, op. 1
    - Performed by: Aleksandra Maslovaric (violin), Tamara Rumiantsev (piano)
  - Violin Concerto in B minor, op. 10
    - Performed by: Aleksandra Maslovaric (violin), Brno Philharmonic, Mikel Toms (conductor)
    - Available:
