= Pasquale Rizzoli =

Italian sculptor

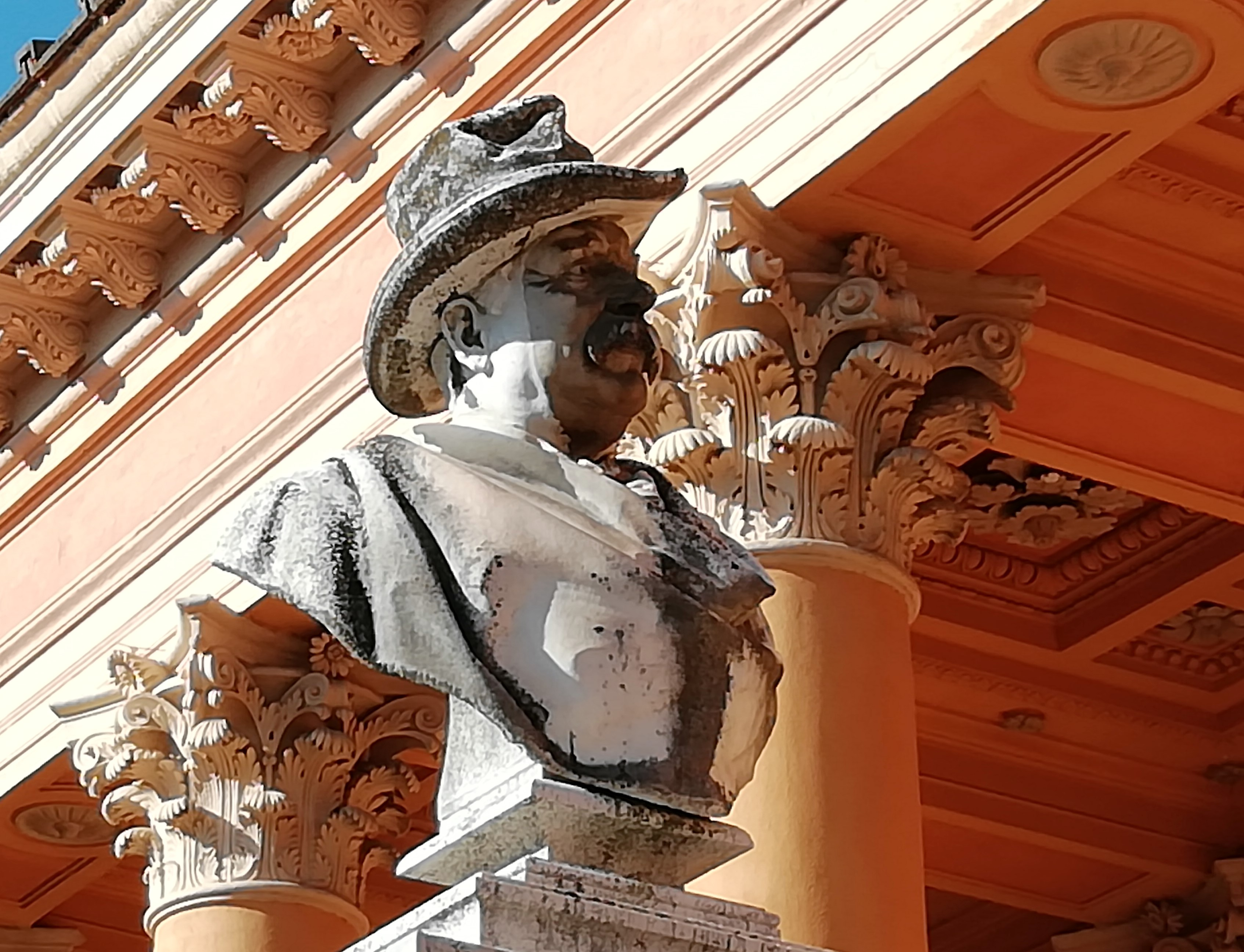
- Born: 9 April 1871; Bologna, Emilia Romagna
- Died: 30 January 1953 (aged 81) in Bologna, Emilia Romagna
- Years active: 1888-1928

Pasquale Rizzoli (9 April 1871, Bologna–30 January 1953) was an Italian sculptor. He was born to a family of wealthy merchants and was married to Adelinda Serra Zanetti in May, 1896. Rizzoli was a student of Salvino Salvini at the Accademia di Belle Arti of Bologna. In addition to his most famous bronze sculpture that, made in 1903, which is found in the Parco della Montagnola in Bologna, many of his works are in the cemetery Certosa of Bologna.

== Style ==
Rizzoli's artistic style is characterized by a mix of realism, with an interest in the effects of light, and the emerging Art Nouveau. This combination is evident in his sculpture for the Possenti-Vecchi family in which he uses the realist style for the faces but has many ornamental details on the same tomb.

As time progressed he began increasingly to favour the art nouveau style over his realism past. His mature style can be seen in the monumental tomb for the Ferrari family (1928).

In the later stages of his life, Rizzoli faced a difficult dichotomy: the desire to make sculptures faced with his disdain of the public taste for art, which he found lacking. Rizzoli did not seek to renovate his style and stopped having exhibits of his works.

== Legacy ==
Despite little production at the end of his career he had an important and fundamental impact on the artistic panorama of Bolognese art at the start of the 20th century. He participated at international exhibitions, like the ones in Bologna 1888 and Milano 1906. His impact continued to the middle of the century due to his ability to analyse, personalise, and synthesise the artistic trends that were present in Europe at the time.
