= Amar Nath Kak =

Kashmiri lawyer

Amar Nath Kak (1889–1963) was a prominent Kashmiri lawyer and author whose most important books are Hamara Vrittanta and the Gayatri, both written in Hindi. He was the older brother of Kashmiri archaeologist and politician Ram Chandra Kak.

Hamara Vrittanta contains information on the social and religious life of Kashmiri Pandits in the first half of the 20th century. It also presents the drama of the war between India and Pakistan.
