= Isabel Peacocke =

NZ teacher, novelist, broadcaster

Inez Isabel Maud Peacocke (31 January 1881–12 October 1973) was a New Zealand teacher, novelist and broadcaster. She was born in Devonport, Auckland, New Zealand in 1881. Ponsonby Peacocke was her grandfather. She is buried at Purewa Cemetery, Auckland.

She wrote fifty novels, mostly for children, but also 16 light adult romances. Significant works include My Friend Phil (1915) and Cathleen with a 'C' (1934).
