= The Viaduct at L'Estaque =

Painting by Georges Braque

- Artist: Georges Braque
- Year: 1907
- Medium: Oil on canvas
- Dimensions: 63.5 cm × 78.74 cm (25.0 in × 31.00 in)
- Location: Minneapolis Institute of Art; Minneapolis

The Viaduct at L'Estaque (French: Viaduc à l'Estaque) is an oil-on-canvas painting by Georges Braque, executed in 1907. The painting has the dimensions of 63.5 by 78.74 cm. It is housed at the Minneapolis Institute of Art.

== History and description ==
Braque made several trips to the south of France, from 1906 to 1910. He took particular interest in the port of L'Estaque, west of Marseille, where he made several paintings. Braque shows the influence of the Fauves and Paul Cézanne in the landscapes he created there in 1907. The nonnaturalistic colours of the Fauves are combined with the reduction to simple geometric forms of the landscape, in a similar way to Cézanne. The artist's own style is also characteristic of this work. By this time, Braque got to know his friend Pablo Picasso's new style of cubism, which caught his interest and he would soon adopt.
