= Conticinio =

Song composed by Laudelino Mejías

"Conticinio" is a well-known Venezuelan song, that was composed in 1922 by Laudelino Mejías, like anecdotal data, Mejías explained that his composition was made when he remembered Trujillo city in Venezuela.

== See also ==
- Venezuela
- Venezuelan music
- Laudelino Mejías
- Ilan Chester
