= Laudelino Mejías =

Venezuelan composer (1893–1963)

Background information
- Born: August 1893; Trujillo, Venezuela
- Died: November 30, 1963 Caracas, Venezuela
- Genre: Venezuelan waltz
- Occupations: musician, composer, director

Laudelino Mejías, (Trujillo, Venezuela, August, 1893-Caracas, Venezuela, November 30, 1963) was a Venezuelan composer, best known for the waltz Conticinio.

== See also ==
- Conticinio
- Venezuelan music
- Venezuelan waltz
