= Montgomery =

Montgomery may refer to:

== People and fictional characters ==
- Montgomery (surname), including a list of people and fictional characters with the surname Montgomery or Montgomerie
- Montgomery (given name), a list of people and fictional characters with the given name
- Montgomerie family, a family of Norman origin belonging to both French and British nobility
- Clan Montgomery, a Scottish clan

== Places ==
=== Pakistan ===
- Sahiwal, a city in Punjab formerly known as Montgomery
- Montgomery District, a former administrative district in Punjab now known as Sahiwal district
  - Montgomery Tahsil, a former administrative subdivision of Montgomery District in Punjab

=== United States ===
- Montgomery, Alabama, state capital
- Montgomery, Georgia
- Montgomery, Illinois
- Montgomery, Indiana
- Montgomery, Iowa
- Montgomery, Kentucky
- Montgomery, Louisiana
- Montgomery, Massachusetts
- Montgomery, Michigan
- Montgomery, Minnesota
- Montgomery, Mississippi
- Montgomery, New York (disambiguation)
- Montgomery, Ohio
- Montgomery, Pennsylvania
- Montgomery, Tennessee
- Montgomery, Texas
- Montgomery, Vermont
- Montgomery, West Virginia
- Montgomery City, Missouri
- Montgomery Creek, California
- Montgomery Reservoir, Colorado
- Montgomery Village, Maryland
- Montgomery County (disambiguation)
- Montgomery Township (disambiguation)

=== Other countries ===
- Montgomery Rocks, Tasmania, Australia
- Electoral division of Montgomery, Tasmania, Australia
- Montgomery Square, Brussels
- Montgomery, Calgary, a neighbourhood in Calgary, Alberta, Canada
- Montgomery, Powys, Wales
  - Montgomery Castle

== Schools ==
- Montgomery Academy (Alabama), a private school in Montgomery, Alabama, United States
- Montgomery Academy, Bispham, a state-funded secondary school in Bispham, Lancashire, England
- Montgomery College, Maryland, United States, a community college
- Montgomery High School (disambiguation)

== Ships ==
- USS Montgomery, several US Navy ships
- SS Richard Montgomery, an American World War II Liberty ship

== Transportation ==
- Montgomery metro station, Brussels, Belgium
- Montgomery Canal, in eastern Powys, Wales, and northwest Shropshire, England
- Montgomery Field, an airport in San Diego, California
- Montgomery Street (disambiguation)

== Other uses ==
- Montgomery Elevator, a defunct elevator company acquired by KONE
- Montgomery Motorcycles, a now defunct British motorcycle manufacturer
- Montgomery Guards, an Irish-American militia unit
- Montgomery cocktail, a Martini mixed at a gin:vermouth ratio of 15:1
- Montgomery Square (disambiguation)
- The Montgomery (Chicago), a building in Illinois, United States
- The Montgomery (San Francisco), a building in California, United States

== See also ==
- Glands of Montgomery, sebaceous glands in the areola, named for Dr. William Fetherstone Montgomery
- Montgomery modular multiplication, a method for multiplying large integers in modulo field
- Sainte-Foy-de-Montgommery, a commune in département Calvados, Normandy
- Saint-Germain-de-Montgommery, a commune in département Calvados, Normandy
- Colleville-Montgomery, a commune in département Calvados, Normandy
- Montgomeryshire (disambiguation)
