= Montgomery Meigs =

Montgomery Meigs may refer to:

== People ==
- Montgomery C. Meigs (1816–1892), Quartermaster General of the U.S. Army during the American Civil War
- Montgomery C. Meigs, Jr. (1847-1931), civil engineer
- Montgomery Cunningham Meigs (1919–1944), World War II lieutenant colonel tank commander, father of Montgomery Meigs (1945–2021)
- Montgomery Meigs (1945–2021), U.S. Army general who served in Vietnam War, the Gulf War, and Bosnian War

== Ships ==
- USAT Meigs, a U.S. Army transport ship sunk early in World War II
- USS General M. C. Meigs, a U.S. Navy transport ship in World War II

== See also ==
- Montgomery Meigs Taylor (1869–1952), admiral during the Spanish–American War, grandson of the Civil War leader
- Montgomery Meigs Atwater (1904–1976), avalanche researcher, grandson of the civil engineer
