= Montgomery High School =

Montgomery High School may refer to:

- Mary G. Montgomery High School in Semmes, Alabama
- Montgomery High School (Brownville, AL)
- Montgomery High School, Blackpool in Blackpool, England
- Montgomery High School (San Diego) in San Diego, California
- Montgomery High School (Santa Rosa, California)
- Montgomery High School in Montgomery, Louisiana
- Montgomery High School (New Jersey) in Skillman, New Jersey
- Montgomery High School in Montgomery, Pennsylvania
- Montgomery High School (Montgomery, Texas) in Montgomery, Texas
- Montgomery Catholic Preparatory School in Montgomery, Alabama
- Bishop Montgomery High School in Torrance, California
- Richard Montgomery High School in Rockville, Maryland
- Montgomery Blair High School in Silver Spring, Maryland
- Montgomery - Lonsdale High School in Montgomery, Minnesota
- East Montgomery High School in Biscoe, North Carolina
- Eastern Montgomery High School in Elliston, Virginia
- West Montgomery High School in Mount Gilead, North Carolina

== See also ==
- Montgomery Academy (disambiguation)
- Montgomery County High School (disambiguation)
