= Irregular warfare =

Warfare in which one or more combatants are irregular military rather than regular forces

Irregular warfare (IW) is defined in United States joint doctrine as "a violent struggle among state and non-state actors for legitimacy and influence over the relevant populations" and in U.S. law as "Department of Defense activities not involving armed conflict that support predetermined United States policy and military objectives conducted by, with, and through regular forces, irregular forces, groups, and individuals." In practice, control of institutions and infrastructure is also important. Concepts associated with irregular warfare are older than the term itself.

Irregular warfare favors indirect warfare and asymmetric warfare approaches, though it may employ the full range of military and other capabilities in order to erode the adversary's power, influence, and will. It is inherently a protracted struggle that will test the resolve of a state and its strategic partners.

The term "irregular warfare" in Joint doctrine was settled upon in distinction from "traditional warfare" and "unconventional warfare", and to differentiate it as such; it is unrelated to the distinction between "regular" and "irregular forces".

== Terminology ==
=== Early usage ===
One of the earliest known uses of the term "irregular warfare" is Charles Edward Callwell's classic 1896 publication for the United Kingdom War Office, Small Wars: Their Principles and Practices, where he noted in defining 'small wars':

Small wars include the partisan warfare which usually arises when trained soldiers are employed in the quelling of sedition and of insurrections in civilised countries; they include campaigns of conquest when a Great Power adds the territory of barbarous races to its possessions; and they include punitive expeditions against tribes bordering upon distant colonies....Whenever a regular army finds itself engaged upon hostilities against irregular forces, or forces which in their armament, their organization, and their discipline are palpably inferior to it, the conditions of the campaign become distinct from the conditions of modern regular warfare, and it is with hostilities of this nature that this volume proposes to deal. Upon the organization of armies for irregular warfare valuable information is to be found in many instructive military works, official and non-official.

A similar usage appears in the 1986 English edition of Modern Irregular Warfare in Defense Policy and as a Military Phenomenon by former Nazi officer Friedrich August Freiherr von der Heydte. The original 1972 German edition of the book is titled Der Moderne Kleinkrieg als Wehrpolitisches und Militarisches Phänomens. The German word "Kleinkrieg" is literally translated as "small war". The word "irregular," used in the title of the English translation, seems to be a reference to non-regular armed forces as per the Third Geneva Convention.

Another early use of the term is in a 1996 Central Intelligence Agency (CIA) document by Jeffrey B. White. Major military doctrine developments related to IW were done between 2004 and 2007 as a result of the September 11 attacks on the United States. A key proponent of IW within US Department of Defense (DoD) is Michael G. Vickers, a former paramilitary officer in the CIA. The CIA's Special Activities Center (SAC) is the premiere American paramilitary clandestine unit for creating and for combating irregular warfare units. For example, SAC paramilitary officers created and led successful irregular units from the Hmong tribe during the war in Laos in the 1960s, from the Northern Alliance against the Taliban during the war in Afghanistan in 2001, and from the Kurdish Peshmerga against Ansar al-Islam and the forces of Saddam Hussein during the war in Iraq in 2003.

=== Other definitions ===
- IW is a form of warfare that has as its objective the credibility and/or legitimacy of the relevant political authority with the goal of undermining or supporting that authority. IW favors indirect approaches, though it may employ the full range of military and other capabilities to seek asymmetric approaches in order to erode an adversary's power, influence, and will.
- IW is defined as a violent struggle among state and non-state actors for legitimacy and influence over the relevant population(s).
- IW involves conflicts in which enemy combatants are not regular military forces of nation-states.
- IW is "war among the people" as opposed to "industrial war" (i.e., regular war).

== Activities ==
Activities and types of conflict included in IW are:

- Asymmetric warfare
- Civil-military operations (CMO)
- Colonial war
- Foreign internal defense (FID)
- Guerrilla warfare (GW)
- Insurgency/Counter-insurgency (COIN)
- Law enforcement activities focused on countering irregular adversaries
- Military Intelligence and counter-intelligence activities
- Stabilization, Security, Transition, and Reconstruction Operations (SSTRO)
- Terrorism/Counter-terrorism
- Transnational criminal activities that support or sustain IW:
  - narco-trafficking
  - Illicit arms trafficking
  - illegal financial transactions
- Unconventional warfare (UW)

According to the DoD, there are five core activities of IW:

- Counter-insurgency (COIN)
- Counter-terrorism (CT)
- Unconventional warfare (UW)
- Foreign internal defense (FID)
- Stabilization Operations (SO)

== Modeling and simulation ==
As a result of DoD Directive 3000.07, United States armed forces are studying irregular warfare concepts using modeling and simulation.

== Examples ==
Nearly all modern wars include at least some element of irregular warfare. Since the time of Napoleon, approximately 80% of conflict has been irregular in nature. However, the following conflicts may be considered to have exemplified by irregular warfare:

- Afghan Civil War
- Algerian War
- American Indian Wars
- American Revolutionary War (Note: According to the definition of "regular forces," which came long after the American Revolutionary War, the American forces did not meet the following criteria at all times during the American Revolutionary War: having a fixed distinctive emblem recognizable at a distance; carrying arms openly; conducting operations in accordance with the laws and customs of war; Nonetheless, in terms of modern international humanitarian law, which was also developed much later than the American Revolutionary War, the American forces formed part of the armed forces of a party to an armed conflict but not belonging to that party's regular forces (since the United States of America did not exist and hence could not have had regular forces; the American forces were an insurgency at least until 1776) and operating in or outside of their own territory even if the territory is under occupation. American forces did become regular forces but cannot be considered regular forces during the entire period of the war. For example, the American flag was established in 1777, two years after the war started (1775). Also, there were great disparities between the American and British forces. It was not until France started to assist American forces (1778) that the disparity started to be narrowed. Conflict during the disparity surely counts as asymmetric warfare. Also, the Boston Tea Party (1773) can be viewed as guerrilla tactics. At the very least, a good portion of the American Revolutionary War should be counted as IW, although the entire war being counted as IW is controversial. However, since more than a half the war was fought as the American Revolutionary War, it is thought that it is safe to classify it as IW even though that the American forces acted in all respects as regular forces towards the end of the conflict.)
- Arab Revolt
- Chinese Civil War
- Cuban Revolution
- First Chechen War
- First Sudanese Civil War
- Iraq War
- Kosovo War
- Lebanese Civil War
- Mexican drug war
- Portuguese Colonial War
- Rwanda Civil War
- Second Boer War
- Second Chechen War
- Second Sudanese Civil War
- Somali Civil War
- Philippine-American War
- The Troubles
- Vietnam War
- Libyan Civil War (2011)
- Syrian Civil War
- Iraqi Civil War (2014–2017)
- Second Libyan Civil War
- Yemeni Civil War (2015–present)

== Wargames and exercises ==
There have been several military wargames and military exercises associated with IW, including:

- Unified Action,
- Unified Quest,
- January 2010 Tri-Service Maritime Workshop,
- Joint Irregular Warrior Series war games,
- Expeditionary Warrior war game series, and
- a December 2011 Naval War College Maritime Stability Operations Game focused specifically on stability operations in the maritime domain conducted by the Naval Service.

== See also ==
- Civilian casualty ratio
- Endemic warfare
- Fourth-generation warfare
- Hague Conventions (1899 and 1907)
- Information warfare
- Irregular military
- Low-intensity conflict
- Political warfare
- Psychological operations
- Small Wars Journal
- The Troubles
- War on terror
- War on drugs

Individuals:

- Che Guevara
- François Géré
- John R. M. Taylor
- T. E. Lawrence
- Robert Rogers' 28 "Rules of Ranging"
