= Montgomery Academy =

Montgomery Academy may refer to:

- Montgomery Academy (Alabama), a private school in Montgomery, Alabama, United States
- Montgomery Academy, Bispham, a state-funded secondary school in Bispham, Lancashire, England

== See also ==
- Montgomery (disambiguation)
