= Stabilization (warfare) =

Activities to placate an unstable region during a war

Stabilization is a dynamic to stabilize a region deemed unstable, as part of counter-insurgency in a war. Stabilization is generally used to refer to the immediate post-conflict phase in a militarized conflict. This is typically thought to occur after military intervention in a period when there may still be a considerable amount of violence, and before actual normalization. Stabilization is "the phase in which basic order has to be/is being restored and preparations are made for long-term reconstruction".

Stabilization programs can include development activities, like building roads and bridges, water wells, schools, and clinics. However, there needs to be an understanding of the situation at the beginning of the intervention (a "baseline") in order to measure stability and any improvements.

The term stabilization has different meanings and refers to all sorts of different activities and definitions. Some states use it to denote a grand strategy for the establishment of sustainable peace, whereas others only focus on the military contribution to so-called stability operations. States have different views on the short-term and long-term objectives, the actors, the level of violence or the duration and the timing of stabilization efforts. For example:

== Canada ==
“Tactical operations conducted by military forces in conjunction with other agencies to maintain, restore and establish a climate of order within which responsible government can function effectively and progress can be achieved".

== France ==
“Stabilization is a process of crisis management aimed at restoring the conditions for minimal viability of a state (or a region), which puts an end to violence as a means of contestation and lays the foundation for a return to normal life by launching a civilian reconstruction process. The stabilization phase is the period of crisis management in which this process in dominant”.

== NATO ==
"The process by which support is given to places descending into or emerging from violent conflict. This is achieved by: preventing or reducing violence; protecting people and key institutions; promoting political processes, which lead to greater stability and preparing for longer-term development; and non-violent politics".

== United Kingdom ==
“The process that supports states which are entering, enduring or emerging from conflict, in order to prevent or reduce violence; protect the population and key infrastructure; promote political processes and governance structures, which lead to a political settlement that institutionalizes non-violent contests for power; and prepares for sustainable social and economic development”.

== United States ==
"Stability operations encompass various military missions, tasks, and activities conducted outside the United States in coordination with other instruments of national power to maintain or reestablish a safe and secure environment, provide essential governmental services, emergency infrastructure reconstruction, and humanitarian relief”.

== See also ==
- Stabilization, Security, Transition, and Reconstruction Operations
- United Nations Stabilisation Mission in Haiti
