= Gary Burgess =

British broadcaster and journalist (1975–2022)

- Born: 13 November 1975; Bury, England
- Died: 1 January 2022 (aged 46); St Helier, Jersey
- Known for: ITV Channel Television; Channel 103; BBC Radio Guernsey; Island FM; Radio Wave 96.5; Jersey Evening Post
- Spouse: Alan Burgess (m. 2018)

Gary Burgess (13 November 1975 – 1 January 2022) was a British broadcaster and journalist, latterly in the Channel Islands where his freelance work on regional television, local radio and a newspaper led him to become known as a community champion who shared openly about his experiences of cancer and chronic fatigue syndrome. He was named Community Champion of the Year in the Jersey Evening Post 2021 Pride of Jersey awards.

== Early life and education ==
Gary Burgess was born in Bury, Greater Manchester on 13 November 1975. At age six, he moved with his family to South Africa due to his father's job. He returned to England at age ten to live in Blackpool, where his grandparents lived. He attended Montgomery High School where he joined their high school radio station 'MHR'. He presented a one-hour golden oldies show at 7 a.m., a one-hour pop programme during the lunch hour and a ten-minute news bulletin. This gave him the desire to have a career in the media.

== Career ==
After leaving school at age 17, he started his broadcasting career in 1992, making cups of tea from 1 a.m. until 7 a.m. during the overnight show at Blackpool's new station Radio Wave 96.5. After his shift there, he worked during the day at a call centre. Still age 17, he went on to host his own show. A few years later, he got a job as a journalist in the station's newsroom, and went on to host the afternoon show, the breakfast show, and then became programme controller. He set the world record for the longest breakfast show, broadcasting for 76 hours and raising tens of thousands of pounds for a new local cancer facility.

He also worked at Wire FM in Warrington, at Q96 in Renfrewshire, at Liverpool's Juice FM and as group programme controller for UTV's radio stations in the north of England.

His first stint in the Channel Islands was in Guernsey, joining the island's only commercial radio station Island FM in 2003 as breakfast presenter and programme director, having instantly "fallen in love" with the island.

He returned to Guernsey in January 2008, initially with no job to go to but, within a few weeks, had joined BBC Radio Guernsey to cover their afternoon show and, within a month, had been appointed as host of their breakfast show.

Burgess made the move to ITV Channel Television's Guernsey office in 2011, and to their Jersey office in March 2012 where he began producing the nightly 6pm news programme. He was a finalist in the Royal Television Society Southern Awards in 2021.

He returned to commercial radio in 2018, joining the presenting line-up at Channel 103. He also wrote regular columns for the Jersey Evening Post.

On 23 September 2021, he was named 'Community Champion of the Year' in the Pride of Jersey Awards in recognition of his journalistic work throughout the COVID-19 pandemic in Jersey.

== Personal life ==
Gary married his long-term partner Alan Stirling in 2018, becoming the first same-sex couple in Jersey to convert a civil partnership to a marriage after the island legalised same-sex marriage. They had held an unofficial wedding ceremony in March, before the law came into effect.

== Illness and death ==
In 1999 when he was aged 23, Burgess was diagnosed with testicular cancer, which spread to his chest and lungs, receiving three months of chemotherapy. In 2014, the cancer had returned to his lungs and, in 2015, he had parts of his right lung removed. He underwent further surgery in August 2016 to remove cancerous tissue between his heart and windpipe. He went on to become a figure head for campaigns by cancer charities including Macmillan Cancer Support and Cancer Research UK.

In 2016, Burgess began to suffer from exhaustion, brain fog, headaches and nausea. In January 2017, he was signed off work for 18 months and was eventually diagnosed as having myalgic encephalomyelitis (ME), also known as chronic fatigue syndrome. He set up a blog to share his experiences of living with the condition, and confessed to having suicidal thoughts.

In October 2019, a CT scan showed five inoperable tumours between his lungs and around his trachea and oesophagus, requiring salvage therapy.

On 3 November 2020, in the midst of the COVID-19 pandemic, Burgess was told in a video call with his oncology consultant in Southampton that his cancer was terminal with no treatment available, and that he would have six to twelve months to live. He retired from broadcasting in August 2021 to focus on his health and wellbeing. Shortly after his final ITV report and radio show, he was awarded a Silver Seal by Jersey's Bailiff, Timothy Le Cocq, in recognition of his contribution to island life.

Burgess had been open about his experience of cancer through a blog, newspaper articles and television interviews and sought to address a taboo about death.

He died from cancer on 1 January 2022 at Jersey Hospice Care, at the age of 46.

== Legacy ==
A Pride of Jersey award was created in his memory, to be awarded to "an inspirational person who has selflessly stepped up to support islanders and bring people together". In 2022, the inaugural award went to Ben Mason who raised money after his 14-year-old sister took her own life. In 2023, it was awarded posthumously to Dean Lowe, an inclusion campaigner, fundraiser and disability champion. In 2023, the posthumous winner was Simon Boas, a humanitarian whose inspirational writings after his own terminal diagnosis were turned into a book.
