= Montgomery (given name) =

Montgomery is a masculine given name which may refer to:

== People ==
- Montgomery Atwater (1904–1976), American author and outdoorsman
- Montgomery Bell (1769–1855), American manufacturing entrepreneur
- Montgomery P. Berry (1824–1898), American commander and politician
- Montgomery Blair (1813–1883), American politician and lawyer
- Montgomery Clift (1920–1966), American film and stage actor
- Montgomery Dent Corse (1816–1895), American banker, gold prospector, and Confederate general
- Montgomery Kaluhiokalani (1958–2013), American surfer
- Montgomery Knight (1901–1943), American aeronautical engineer
- Montgomery Oliver Koelsch (1912–1992), United States federal judge
- Montgomery McFate (born 1966), American cultural anthropologist
- Montgomery Meigs (disambiguation)
- Montgomery Pittman (1917–1962), American television director
- Montgomery Schuyler (1843–1914), American architect and critic
- Montgomery Schuyler Jr. (1877–1955), American diplomat
- Montgomery Sicard (1836–1900), American army officer
- Montgomery Slatkin (born 1945), American biologist
- Montgomery Steele, Canadian country music artist
- Montgomery M. Taylor (1869–1952), American naval officer
- Montgomery Tully (1904–1988), Irish film director
- Montgomery Wilson (1909–1964), Canadian figure skater

== Fictional characters ==
- Charles Montgomery Burns, from the animated sitcom The Simpsons
- Montgomery “Monty” de la Cruz, in the television series 13 Reasons Why
- Montgomery Fiske, on the animated series Kim Possible
- Montgomery Gator, from the video game Five Nights at Freddy's: Security Breach
- Montgomery "Lightning" McQueen, the main protagonist of the Cars film franchise
- Montgomery Montgomery, from the novels A Series of Unfortunate Events
- Montgomery Moose, from the animated series The Get Along Gang
- Montgomery "Scotty" Scott, on Star Trek
