= Montgomery Township, Ohio =

Montgomery Township, Ohio may refer to:

- Montgomery Township, Ashland County, Ohio
- Montgomery Township, Hamilton County, Ohio, a paper township for the City of Montgomery
- Montgomery Township, Marion County, Ohio
- Montgomery Township, Wood County, Ohio

== See also ==
- Montgomery Township (disambiguation)
