= Montgomeryville =

Montgomeryville is the name of some places:

United States

- Montgomeryville, Pennsylvania, a census-designated place
- Montgomeryville, Wisconsin, an unincorporated community

== See also ==
- Montgomery (disambiguation)
