= Simon Boas =

British aid worker (1977–2024)

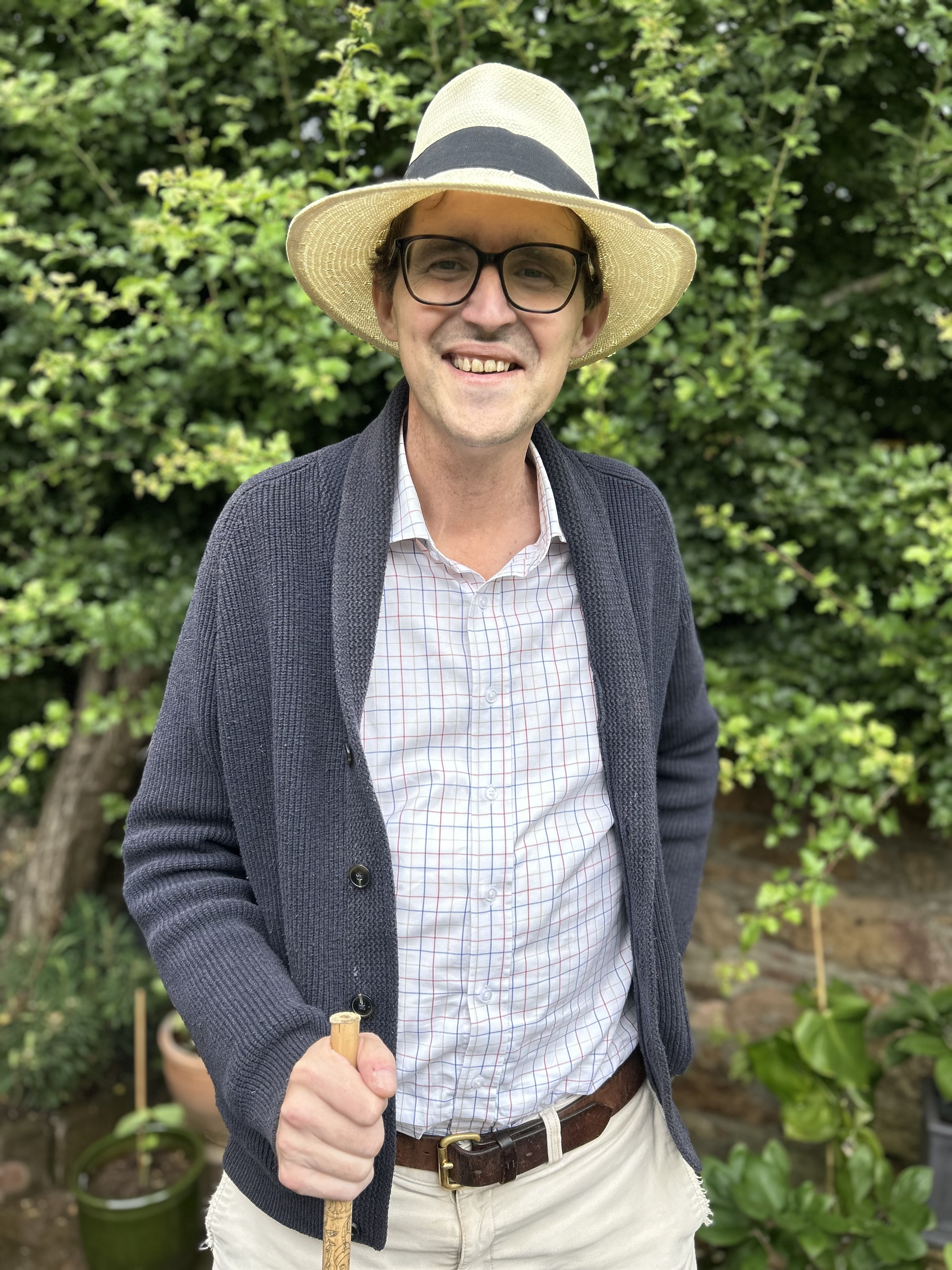
- Boas in June 2024
- Born: 6 July 1977; London
- Died: 15 July 2024 (aged 47); Jersey
- Cause of death: Cancer
- Education: University of Oxford; University of Bath (MSc)
- Occupation: Aid worker
- Years active: 2004 – 2024
- Employer: Jersey Overseas Aid
- Board member of: Jersey Heritage
- Spouse: Aurélie Veyret (m. 2010)

Simon Charles Boas (6 July 1977 – 15 July 2024) was a British aid worker who worked for development charities and the United Nations (UN). His writings about his terminal illness diagnosis—widely described as inspirational—were featured in British national newspapers and on BBC Radio 4's Today programme.

He delivered humanitarian aid to a refugee camp as a teenager and later earned a master's degree in international policy analysis. His early career took him across the Middle East and South Asia, first as a tour guide and then as a development professional working with international NGOs and the United Nations.

Over two decades, Boas held senior roles in humanitarian and development projects, including with the Palestinian Authority and the UN's Food and Agriculture Organization in Gaza and Nepal. In 2016, he became executive director of Jersey Overseas Aid, while serving as a Samaritans volunteer, honorary police officer, and chair of Jersey Heritage.

In 2023, Boas was diagnosed with terminal throat cancer. His candid essays on mortality, later collected in A Beginner's Guide to Dying, explored illness, acceptance, and meaning. Shortly before his death in July 2024, he received the Bailiff of Jersey's silver seal for his service to others, and posthumously the Pride of Jersey's Gary Burgess Award.

== Early life and education ==
He grew up in London where he attended Dulwich College Preparatory School, before moving to Winchester where he won a scholarship for his secondary education at Winchester College, an all-boys boarding school. His father was a businessman, and his mother was a book editor who also worked for Citizens Advice. Both volunteer for the homelessness charity Shelter and their local food bank.

Boas volunteered at a night shelter while at school. At the age of 16 he delivered his first humanitarian aid convoy to a refugee camp near Mostar in Bosnia with a church group, encountering mass graves and bombed out villages. During a gap year he lived in Cambodia and Vietnam.

He studied English at Brasenose College, Oxford, but a car accident meant he did not sit his final exams. In 2006–7 he studied for a master's degree in international policy analysis at the University of Bath.

== Career ==
After university, Boas worked as a tour guide in Egypt, Turkey and India. In 2004 he went on to work for the Palestine Economic Policy Research Institute (MAS). In 2008 he worked in Ramallah for a year as special adviser to the Minister of Planning and International Cooperation for the Palestinian National Authority, including helping develop the reconstruction plan for Gaza after the war in 2008–2009. During this time he learned Arabic at Birzeit University and met his French future wife Aurélie—an intern with a Palestinian news agency studying for a masters in journalism—when he helped her onto a crowded bus from Ben Gurion Airport in Tel Aviv to Jerusalem. She described him as "a tall English gentleman in a Panama, reading The Economist".

After their marriage, the couple lived in the Gaza Strip from 2010 to 2012 where he was head of the UN Food and Agriculture Organization office. In November 2012, they moved to Nepal where he worked for the same organisation as coordinator of its Emergency Centre for Transboundary Animal Diseases.

In October 2014 they returned to the UK and he began work for the Government, where he was seconded to several organisations including HM Revenue & Customs and the Government of Jersey. They moved permanently to Jersey in 2016 where he was executive director of Jersey's overseas aid agency from that October until his death in 2024.

During their time in Jersey, Boas and his wife volunteered for the Honorary Police in their home parish of Trinity, which entailed being called out to deal with incidents like dangerous overhanging branches and loose horses, but he never made any arrests. He became a Samaritans volunteer in 2019, manning a crisis hotline. He was a trustee of Jersey Heritage from 2020 and became chairman in 2023.

== Cancer diagnosis ==
A heavy smoker, Boas estimated that he had smoked around 200,000 cigarettes over 30 years and described a few periods of his drinking as "fairly Churchillian". In September 2023, when he was aged 46, Boas wrote an article in the Jersey Evening Post where he announced that lumps in his neck and difficulty swallowing had been diagnosed as terminal throat cancer. Despite chemotherapy and radiotherapy at Southampton General Hospital, the squamous-cell carcinoma spread to his lungs, liver, spine, pelvis, sternum and soft tissues.

The newspaper published the second of three articles about his diagnosis and approach to life on 11 February 2024, and it was subsequently reprinted in The Spectator, The Daily Telegraph and the Daily Mail. He also read it on the BBC Radio 4 programme Broadcasting House.

His third and final article was published on 13 May 2024. People from all over the world contacted him, including celebrants and priests who wanted permission to read parts of the letters at weddings or in sermons.

In May 2024 he was awarded the Bailiff of Jersey's silver seal "for his contribution to the Island through service to the community and to the betterment of humanity through both his work in Jersey Overseas Aid and by his writings". On 6 July he moved into Jersey Hospice Care. During his last days, he was due to meet Charles III and Queen Camilla at a tea party during their visit to the island, but as his condition had worsened, instead the Lieutenant Governor of Jersey delivered a hand-written letter from them which said how moved they had been by his charitable work and courage.

He died at the hospice on 15 July 2024, the day of the royal visit.

== A Beginner's Guide to Dying ==
His book, A Beginner's Guide to Dying (ISBN 978-1-80-075503-1), became the second-best seller on Amazon.co.uk through pre-orders before being published posthumously in hardback by Swift Press on 12 September 2024. He also narrated an audiobook version.

The first section of the book includes copies of the Jersey Evening Post articles. A section entitled 'Death and Equanimity' includes his thoughts on meditation, gratitude, God and religion, counselling, others' grief, psychedelics – in which he advocates use of psilocybin – miracle cures, hope and acceptance, thinking about death, optimism, regrets and bucket lists. The final section gives his advice on interacting with the dying.

Reviewing the book for The Guardian, Alex Preston wrote that "you're struck repeatedly by the terrible juxtaposition of the rush of erudition from this fantastically bright mind still thrumming with life and wit, and the silence of the end, which is so near." He added, "There are wonderful vignettes, beautiful meditations on faith and friendship, advice for the dying and those around them."

It was announced that some of the proceeds would be donated to the International Children's Palliative Care Network and African Palliative Care Association. The book became a bestseller in the first week of sales, and all 20,000 copies in the initial print run sold within the first month. It was due to be published in seven other countries including Germany, Japan, Latvia and Taiwan.

== Legacy ==
At the 2024 Pride of Jersey Awards, Boas was posthumously awarded the Gary Burgess award, which was established in memory of a Jersey journalist who died of cancer in 2022 "to recognise islanders who stand out as beacons of the community and for bringing people together in times of adversity".

In November 2024, Jersey Finance renamed one of its Sustainable Finance Awards the "Simon Boas Award for Outstanding Individual Contribution". He had previously been a member of the judging panel. The award was presented for the first time in 2025 by his widow.

Emma Barnett's interview with him for BBC Radio 4's Today programme was selected as "Interview of the Year 2024".

In January 2026, the University of Bath awarded Boas a posthumous doctorate — Doctor of Policy Research and Practice — presented to his sister by the university’s chancellor, Prince Edward, Duke of Edinburgh.

== Bibliography ==
- Cyclists are Cunts: A Poem (16 April 2024; ISBN 979-8-32-300354-9)
- A Beginner's Guide to Dying (12 September 2024, Swift Press; ISBN 9781800755031 / 15 July 2025, Vintage Books; ISBN 9798217007745)
  Polish translation: Poradnik umierania dla początkujących (12 March 2025, Agora; ISBN 978-8383801612)
  Latvian translation: Miršanas ceļvedis iesācējam (1 August 2025, Zvaigzne ABC; ISBN 9789934332777)
  Italian translation: Morire. Istruzioni per l'uso (29 August 2025, Garzanti; ISBN 9788811016861)
  German translation: Was dicke Bücher und grüne Bananen mit dem Tod zu tun haben: … und andere Dinge, die ich über Leben und Sterben gelernt habe (10 September 2025, Mosaik Verlag; ISBN 978-3442394555)
  Chinese translation: 我47歲就要死了,但很平靜滿足 : 一個癌末男子如何知足,樂觀面對生命的結束 (2024, True Culture Publishing; ISBN 9786269899623)
  Lithuanian translation: PRADEDANČIOJO GIDAS Į MIRTĮ: bestseleriu tapusi meditacija apie gyvenimą ir jo pabaigą (2025, Abulys; ISBN 9786094849077)

== See also ==
- Being Mortal
