= Montgomery, New York (disambiguation) =

Montgomery, New York may refer to several places:

- Montgomery (town), New York in Orange County
  - Montgomery (village), New York in Orange County
- Montgomery County, New York

== See also ==
- Fort Montgomery (Hudson River), an American Revolutionary War fort near West Point on the Hudson River
- Fort Montgomery, New York, a hamlet (and census-designated place) in Orange County
- Montgomery (disambiguation)
