= Vic McGlynn =

English radio presenter and disc jockey

- Born: Victoria Claire McGlynn; 19 May 1978 (age 48); Cleveleys, Blackpool, Lancashire
- Occupations: radio presenter, voiceover, disc jockey, actress, student nurse

Victoria Claire McGlynn, known as Vic McGlynn, (born 19 May 1978) is a former English radio presenter, voiceover, disc jockey (DJ), who is now a practicing nurse.

She is also a performance DJ, as well as a former comedian, and has performed as an animal mascot as a monkey, shark, lion and rabbit, and on stage with The Flaming Lips at the Manchester Apollo.

McGlynn also works as an actress in varied productions.

In 2020 McGlynn began working for the National Health Service (NHS) as part of the MTU (mobile testing unit). The MTU was enforced to help stop the spread of COVID-19 coronavirus and she was employed by the Scottish Ambulance Service. In 2021 she began her studies in Adult Nursing (MSc) at the University of Dundee and qualified in 2024. She practices in Edinburgh.

== Background ==
McGlynn was raised in Blackpool. She attended Montgomery High School in Bispham, and left in 1994. She began her career in radio at the age of 13 working on her school station before graduating to a voluntary role at local station Radio Wave.

McGlynn cites her love of 1980s pop band The Smiths, who she became an avid fan of when she was eight years old, as the reason behind her passion for music.

== Career ==
In 1994 McGlynn started working at Blackpool Tower as DJ and compere in the family entertainment room, The Hornpipe Gallery, where she stayed until 1997. She began her broadcasting career at the age of 17 in 1995 starting off as a weekend presenter on Splash FM in Blackpool. In 1997 she worked at Rock FM in Preston as the weekend overnight presenter. Aged 20, she moved to London where she produced and co-hosted the breakfast show as part of "Flynn and McGlynn in the Morning" on Millennium FM.

From 1999 to 2000 she worked as a presenter for Virgin Megastore Radio in London. And in 2000 she was co-presenter and producer of the breakfast show on Channel 4 FM, Dubai, UAE. She then moved back to England and worked as a presenter on Juice 107.6 in Liverpool until 2001. Later that year she moved to Galaxy 102 in Manchester, where she was presented the mid-morning show and the Sunday breakfast show. She also worked as a stand-up comedian on the Manchester Comedy circuit, and was named as "a newcomer to look out for" by BBC Radio Manchester.

In 2003 McGlynn joined the digital radio station BBC 6 Music, hosting the weekly 6 Music Chart, before becoming the presenter of the weekday lunch time radio music show.

In 2006 McGlynn announced that her last afternoon show for BBC 6 Music was to be on 25 August 2006 and then left the BBC to embark on a trip circumnavigating Australia on a tandem bicycle.

In 2007/2008, McGlynn hosted and produced a weekly show titled 'Oddball' on 'Bondi Fm'. This was a 2-hour show, playing rarities from all genres. She then as part of the Wwoof (Willing Workers on Organic Farms) programme, worked at the Flying Fox Backpackers – managing it for short time – in Katoomba, New South Wales, Australia.

Returning to the UK, she freelanced within Commercial Radio, BBC Local Radio, and as a specialist presenter with fellow 6 music presenter Jo Good on Beatwolf Radio.

McGlynn retired from radio in 2017 but continues her voice acting work and can be heard on commercial radio and the BBC.

She resides in Scotland.

== Personal life ==
McGlynn is the granddaughter of professional cricketer William Aubrey Hill who played for Warwickshire County Cricket Club from 1929 to 1948 and who lived in Blackpool and died there in 1995. She is also related to both Nick Banks, the drummer with alternative rock band Pulp, actress Molly McGlynn, and writer and journalist Victoria Segal.

== Quotes ==
On Kurt Cobain, McGlynn has said:

Kurt left a legacy of a brutally honest artist who opened up his most personal thoughts and exposed his self-loathing and laid them down for all to see. His music was honest, tortured and vulnerable. He gave his all for his art but left nothing for himself.

== See also ==
- BBC 6 Music
