= William M. Steele =

United States Army general

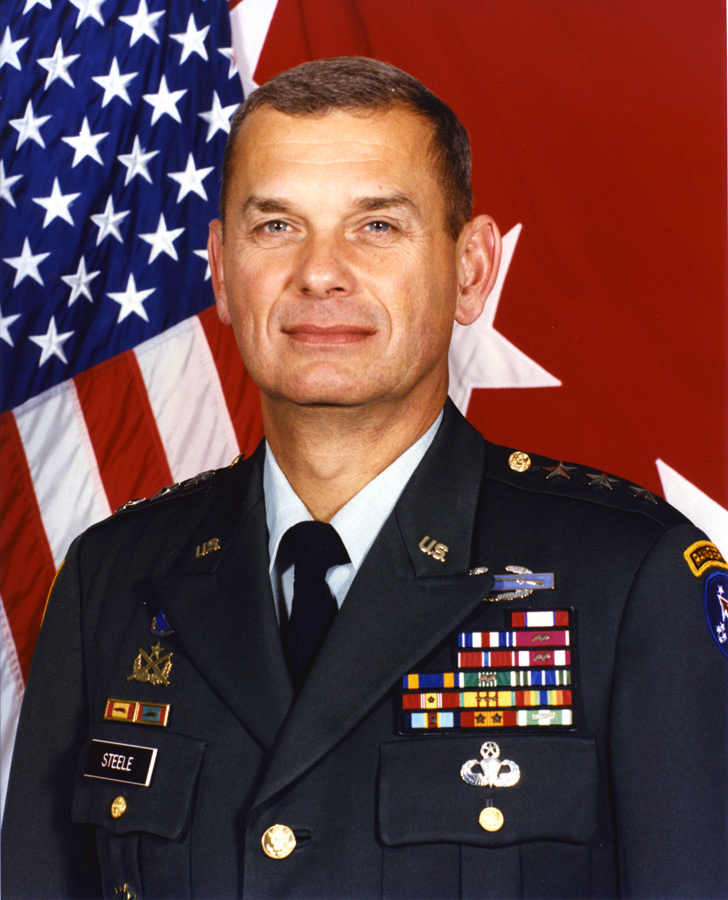
- Lieutenant General William M. Steele
- Military career
- Allegiance: United States of America
- Branch: United States Army
- Service years: 1967-2001
- Rank: Lieutenant General
- Commands: United States Army Pacific; Combined Arms Center; 82nd Airborne Division; 504th Parachute Infantry Regiment
- Conflicts: Vietnam War
- Awards: Silver Star; Legion of Merit; Bronze Star

William Michael Steele is a retired United States Army lieutenant general who commanded major organizations including U.S. Army, Pacific, the Combined Arms Center and the 82d Airborne Division . A native of Atlanta, Georgia, he graduated from The Citadel in 1967 and earned a Master of Arts in management from Webster University in St. Louis. His military education includes the National War College.

Commissioned an armor officer and assigned to the 3d Armored Division in Germany, he branch transferred to infantry while serving in South Vietnam. As an infantry officer, he served in airborne, air assault, light and mechanized Infantry units. In South Vietnam, Steele served from 1969 to 1970 as battalion advisor for the 23rd Ranger Battalion and operations advisor for the 2nd Ranger Group conducting operations in the highlands of Kontum and Pleiku Provinces in South Vietnam and in Cambodia. Promoted to brigadier general in 1990, his major command assignments include serving as deputy commanding general of the US Army Infantry Center at Fort Benning, Georgia, assistant division commander for the 8th Infantry Division in Germany and deputy commandant for the U.S. Army Command and General Staff College at Fort Leavenworth. LTG Steele served as commanding general, 82nd Airborne Division at Fort Bragg, North Carolina, U. S. Army Pacific headquartered at Fort Shafter, Hawaii, and the U. S. Army Combined Arms Center at Fort Leavenworth, Kansas.

Other major duty assignments for Steele were commanding officer, 2d Battalion, 504th Parachute Infantry Regiment, and commanding officer, 504th Parachute Infantry Regiment (Devils in Baggy Pants) at Fort Bragg, North Carolina, executive assistant to General Maxwell Thurman when he was commanding general, U. S. Army Training and Doctrine Command, and as director for operations for the U.S. Atlantic Command in Norfolk, Virginia. Steele retired from active duty on 30 September 2001. After retirement, he served as a senior executive in the defense industry and on several boards and as a member of The Citadel board of visitors.

== Awards and decorations ==

Military offices
| Preceded by Montgomery C. Meigs | Commandants of the United States Army Command and General Staff College; October 23, 1998 - July 25, 2001 | Succeeded by James C. Riley |
