= Being Mortal =

Book by Atul Gawande

Being Mortal: Medicine and What Matters in the End
- Author: Atul Gawande
- Language: English
- Published: October 7, 2014
- Publisher: Metropolitan Books
- Publication place: United States of America
- ISBN: 0805095152

Being Mortal: Medicine and What Matters in the End is a 2014 non-fiction book by American surgeon Atul Gawande. The book addresses end-of-life care, hospice care, and also contains Gawande's reflections and personal stories. He suggests that medical care should focus on well-being rather than survival. Being Mortal has won awards, appeared on lists of best books, and been featured in a documentary.

== Description ==
Being Mortal is a meditation on how people can better live with age-related frailty, serious illness, and approaching death. Gawande calls for a change in the way that medical professionals treat patients approaching their ends. He recommends that instead of focusing on survival, practitioners should work to improve quality of life and enable well-being. Gawande shares personal stories of his patients' and his own relatives' experiences, the realities of old age which involve broken hips and dementia, overwhelmed families and expensive geriatric care, and loneliness and loss of independence.

In the beginning of the book he explores different models of senior living, including concepts such as poorhouses, multi-generational households and nursing homes. Gawande explores personal stories as well as accounts from geriatric doctors such as Keren Brown Wilson, an originator of the assisted living concept. He ruminates on stories of people dealing with age-related frailty, serious illness and death, and his own confrontation with mortality. Gawande emphasizes the notion that people nearing death should be given the opportunity to live a meaningful life and still have a purpose.

In the latter part of the book, Gawande shifts to end-of-life medical care and mentions practices such as euthanasia and physician-assisted suicide. He postulates that hospice is the most humane model of care.

The book includes two of Gawande's New Yorker essays, which make up two of the book's eight chapters: "Things Fall Apart" and "Letting Go".

== Reception ==
Being Mortal won British Medical Association Council Chair's Choice, the overall prize, at the BMA Medical Book Awards, and the National MS Society Books for a Better Life Award Winner. Other recognitions include, Samuel Johnson Prize for Non-Fiction Nominee for Longlist (2014), Royal Society of Biology General Book Prize (2015), Oprah.com Best Books of the Year, Los Angeles Times Holiday Books Guide, BuzzFeed Best Books of the Year, Shelf Awareness Best Books of the Year, Apple iBooks Best of the Year, L.A. Times Book Prize – Finalist, NPR Best Book of the Year, Indies Choice Book Awards winner, Milwaukee Journal Sentinel Guide to the 100 Best Books of the Year, Barnes & Noble Discover Great New Writers Award, Audie Award finalist, Amazon's Best Books of the Year, Barnes and Noble Best New Books of the Year, and The Economist Books of the Year.

== Adaptations ==
=== Television documentary ===
"Being Mortal" was a PBS Frontline documentary episode based on the book of the same name that aired February 2015. It was directed and co-written by Thomas Jennings; Gawande served as co-writer and correspondent. It follows Gawande "as he explores the relationships doctors have with patients who are nearing the end of life". The film shows how doctors—himself included—are often untrained, ill-suited and uncomfortable talking about chronic illness and death with their patients. "Being Mortal" was nominated for an Emmy award in the "Outstanding Informational Programming: Long Form" category.

=== Film ===
In February 2022, Searchlight Pictures announced the development of a film adaptation written, directed, and produced by Aziz Ansari in his feature directorial debut. It was set to star Ansari, Bill Murray, Keke Palmer, and Seth Rogen. After principal photography began on March 28, 2022, Searchlight halted production on April 18 and officially suspended production on April 20 after investigating a complaint filed against Murray for "inappropriate behavior" a week prior.

== See also ==
- A Beginner's Guide to Dying
