= François Géré =

French historian

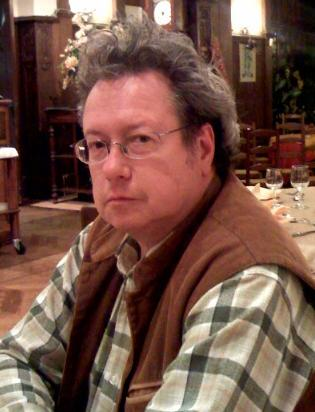
François Géré in 2007.

François Géré (born August 28, 1950), a French historian specializing in geostrategy, is notably the founding president of the French strategic analysis institute, the Institut français d’analyse stratégique (IFAS). He is also an official representative for the French Institute of Higher National Defense Studies, the Institut des Hautes études de défense nationale (IHEDN) and research director at Paris III University. He was awarded the distinction of Knight of the French Legion of Honor in 2005.

== Life path ==
=== An education focused on analyzing wars and nuclear arms control ===
François Géré was born in Paris on August 28, 1950. In 1975, he became Agrégé in History, PhD in 1991, then in 2000 he obtained post-doctoral research accreditation (Docteur Habilité) in contemporary history at the University of Paris III – Sorbonne Nouvelle, where he was appointed research director in 2003. At the same time, he contributed from 1977 to 1982 to the magazine Cahiers du Cinéma , under the section “Cinéma, Histoire et Guerre” (Cinema, History, and War).

As early as 1985, he specialized in analysis of irregular wars (Indochina, Algeria, etc.) and the first developments of the nuclear weapon under the French Fourth Republic, as well as in the study of the different currents of French and American strategic thought since 1945. In 1988, he entered the Fondation pour les etudes de defense nationale, where until 1992 he was student and assistant to General Lucien Poirier, a theoretician in nuclear deterrence. During several stays in the United States, he trained in the physics of nuclear weapons and in ballistics from the perspective of oversight processes for arms control treaties.

=== Research and advisory activities ===
In 1993, François Géré was technical advisor for nuclear affairs and official representative for arms control at the French national secretariat for national defense and security (Secrétariat général de la défense et de la sécurité nationale).

In 1994-95, he was visiting professor at the School of Advanced International Studies (SAIS) at Johns Hopkins University in Washington, D.C., where he taught French foreign and defense policy.

Senior researcher in 1994 at the Centre de Recherches et d'Études sur les Stratégies et les Technologies or Centre for Study of Strategies and Technologies (CREST) of the École Polytechnique in Palaiseau (France), in 1997 he became director of scientific affairs at the Foundation for Strategic Research, then in 2001 founded the Institut Diplomatie et Défense, which in 2003 became the Institut français d'analyse stratégique (IFAS), of which he is director (see below for more details on the IFAS). At the same time, he directed the Institut Diplomatie et Défense (2001–2004).

Starting in 1998, François Géré developed an independent research program on the relations between China, the United States and the European Union.

=== Institut français d'analyse stratégique (IFAS) ===
The Institut français d’analyse stratégique studies all the conflicts around the world. Its analyses focus on the material and spiritual motives that generate them, on the military forms that they take, in particular terrorism and guerrilla warfare, and on all the technological instruments that they use. Because of the extreme importance of this latter component, the IFAS analyzes nuclear proliferation, chemical and bio-bacteriological risks, and strategies connected to missiles and anti-missiles. as well as the development of military activity in space. IFAS activities comprise all the fields connected with nuclear warfare, added to which is research on the conflicts and terrorism in the Middle East.

The institute studies procedures for controlling organized violence and returning to a state of peace, and the role of international organizations in managing and resolving crises. In this perspective, it gives special attention to information operations, psychological action, and conflict mediation.

The IFAS approach consists in combining field studies (Pakistan, Iran, Israel, Palestine, etc.) with theoretical considerations on the modern forms of war as linked to the historical and anthropological constants governing human confrontations.

== Main publications ==
=== Books ===
- La prolifération nucléaire, coll. Que sais-je ?, Presses universitaires de France, Paris 1995, 127 pp.
- La guerre psychologique, Economica, Paris, 1997, 423 pp.
- Demain la guerre : une visite guidée, Calmann-Lévy, Paris, 1997, 257 pp.
- La société sans la guerre, Ed. Desclée de Brouwer, Paris, 1998, 329 pp.
- La réserve et l'attente : l'avenir des armes nucléaires françaises, with General Lucien Poirier, Economica, Paris, 2001, 329 pp.
- Les volontaires de la mort : l’arme du suicide, coll. Essais Bayard, Bayard Presse, Paris, 2003, 295 pp.
- Pourquoi les guerres ? Un siècle de géopolitique, coll. 20/21, d’un siècle à l’autre, Ed. Larousse, Paris, 2002, 192 pp.
- Pourquoi le terrorisme ?, coll. Pourquoi, Ed. Larousse, Paris, 2006, 160 pp.
- Iran, l'état de crise, coll. Tropiques, Karthala, Paris, 2010, 252 pp.
- Dictionnaire de la désinformation, Éditions Armand Colin, Paris, 2011, 352 pp.

=== Proposal Paper ===
"World Governance of Civilian and Military Nuclear Energy", Proposal Paper, Forum for a new World Governance, March 2010, 64 pp.

=== Articles ===
- "La mesure de l’homme, essai sur l’imaginaire raciste", Cahiers du Cinéma, N° 315, September 1980.
- "American Strategy, Space, Strategic Negotiations", United Nations Institute for Disarmament Research Newsletter, Vol. 3, The Institute, New York, 1980.
- "In Search of a Missing Link: Nuclear Terrorism and Nuclear Smugglng", unpublished manuscript, Centro A. Volta, Como (Italy), 1994.
- "U.S. Hegemony and NATO", Defense News, Washington DC, March 8–14, 1999.
- "French Offer New Path", Defense News, Washington DC, August 6–12, 2001.

=== Contributions to collective works ===
- "Two Fictions Concerning Hate", with Jean-Louis Comolli in Jenkins, Stephen (ed.), Fritz Lang: The Image and the Look, British Film Institute, London, 1981.
- "Suicide Bombing: A possibility for France?", in Sharpe, Mary (ed.), Suicide Bombers: The Psychological, Religious and Other Imperatives, NATO Science for Peace and Security Series, Proceedings of the NATO Advanced Research Workshop on Suicide Bombers: The Psychological, Religious and Other Imperatives, IOS Press, Amsterdam, 2008.
- "Suicide Operations: Between War and Terrorism", in Gérard Chaliand and Arnaud Blin, The History of Terrorism: From Antiquity to Al Qaeda, University of California Press, Berkeley and Los Angeles, 2007.
