= Montgomeryshire (disambiguation) =

Montgomeryshire is a historic county and former administrative county and district in Wales.

Montgomeryshire may also refer to:

- Montgomeryshire (UK Parliament constituency), a former constituency of the House of Commons of the Parliament of the United Kingdom
- Montgomeryshire (Senedd constituency), a constituency of the Senedd
- Montgomeryshire Canal

== See also ==
- Shropshire and Montgomeryshire Railway, a railway running from Shrewsbury, England to Llanymynech, Wales
- Montgomery (disambiguation)
