= Montgomery Street (disambiguation) =

Montgomery Street may refer to:

- Montgomery Street in the heart of the Financial District, San Francisco, and home to Montgomery Street Station
  - New Montgomery Street, the extension of San Francisco's Montgomery Street south of Market Street
- Montgomery Street (Baltimore), home to Little Montgomery Street Historic District
- Montgomery Street in Louisville, Kentucky, home to Montgomery Street School
- Southwest Montgomery Street in Portland, Oregon, home to the PSU Urban Center
- Montgomery Street (Savannah, Georgia), home to Savannah Civic Center
- Montgomery Street in Syracuse, New York, home to Montgomery Street-Columbus Circle Historic District
- Montgomery Street (Manhattan) in New York City's Lower East Side
- Monto, colloquial name for Montgomery Street, Dublin, former red-light district in Ireland
