= Montgomery County High School =

Montgomery County High School may refer to several high schools in the United States:

- Montgomery County High School (Alabama) in Montgomery, Alabama
- Montgomery County High School (Georgia) in Mount Vernon, Georgia
- Montgomery County High School (Kentucky) in Mount Sterling, Kentucky
- Montgomery County High School (Mississippi) in Kilmichael, Mississippi
- Montgomery County High School (Missouri) in Montgomery City, Missouri

== See also ==
- Montgomery County Public Schools (Maryland), Montgomery County, Maryland
- Montgomery County Public Schools (Virginia), Montgomery County, Virginia
