= USS Montgomery =

USS Montgomery may refer to the following ships of the United States Navy:

- USS Montgomery (1776) was a frigate that was never completed during the Revolutionary War.
- USS Montgomery (1813) was a sloop or schooner in service from 1813 to 1815.
- USS Montgomery (1861) was a screw-driven steamer in service from 1861 to 1865.
- USS Montgomery (C-9) was an unprotected cruiser in service between 1891 and 1918.
- USS Montgomery (DD-121) was a destroyer commissioned in 1918 and later converted to a minelayer. Served in World War II, and sold for scrap in 1946.
- USS Montgomery (LCS-8) is an Independence-class littoral combat ship commissioned in 2016

== See also ==
- USS Elmer Montgomery was a destroyer escort, later redesignated a frigate. Launched in November 1970 and decommissioned in June 1993.
- USS Montgomery County was a World War II tank landing ship.
- Montgomery (sloop) was an American privateer during the War for Independence commissioned by the State of New York
- SS Richard Montgomery was a Liberty ship that was wrecked off Sheerness, Thames estuary, England, in 1944 with thousands of tons of ammunition on board.
