= Montgomery Square (disambiguation) =

Montgomery Square is a major intersection in the east of Brussels.

Montgomery Square may also refer to:

- Montgomery Square, Pennsylvania, US
- Montgomery Square, in the centre of Wath-upon-Dearne, England
- Montgomery Square, Canary Wharf, London, site of a sculpture by Eilis O'Connell

== See also ==
- Montgomery modular multiplication
