= John R. M. Taylor =

American military officer (1865–1949)

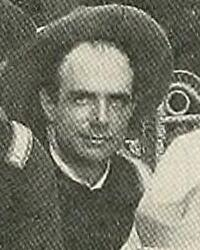
John R. M. Taylor in 1899

John Rodgers Meigs Taylor (13 January 1865 – 31 March 1949) (Note: Sources provide various renderings of his name. The middle names are often given as initials but the R, if spelled out, is variously given as e.g., Rogers, Rodgers, or Roger.) was a captain of the 14th Infantry Regiment of the United States Army. He was placed in charge of what became known as the Philippine Insurgent Records. That is, the collection of documents seized from Philippine revolutionaries during the Philippine–American War. Taylor later served as military attaché at the U.S. embassy in Constantinople, Turkey from 1911 to 1914 and retired from the Army on 9 July 1918 as a colonel.

Taylor was a West Point graduate of 1889 and served in the Boxer Rebellion in China in 1899. Subsequently, he was transferred to the Philippines in the same year. General Elwell Stephen Otis, Military Governor of the Philippines, instructed him to collate original documents captured from "insurgents' in the Spanish–American War and to translate them for the United States Department of War and the United States Senate.

== Philippine Insurgent Records ==
Taylor returned to the United States in 1901 and was detailed to the Bureau of Insular Affairs where he supervised the filing, selection and translation of a representation of some of the 200,000 documents from that conflict. For five years Taylor supervised the transcription and translation (from Spanish or Tagalog) of these documents in order to present what he claimed would be a "truthful version" of the Philippine revolution and the subsequent war between the Philippine revolutionaries and the American colonialists.

In his letter of transmittal for the compilation, Taylor wrote of the documents in the compilation:

These telegrams were found by me while in charge of the division of military information, adjutant-general's office, Division of the Philippines, among a mass of papers captured from the so-called insurgent government. I do not suppose that they are by any means all the telegrams received by Aguinaldo between June, 1898 and March, 1899. They are merely papers which have survived the vicissitudes of warfare and the series must necessarily be incomplete, but they show, to me at least, that Aguinaldo relied much on the opinion and advice of other men; that there was serious opposition to his government even in Luzon; that it had been fully determined to attack the Americans in Manila upon a favorable opportunity, and that in the event of the success of this attack the so-called insurgent government would not have continued even to call itself a republic. A republic does not award titles of nobility.

Taylor ordered the Government Printing Office to typeset galley proofs, with two volumes dedicated to his analytical history of US-Philippine relations and three other volumes containing 1,340 supporting papers of original documents. Then Secretary of War William Howard Taft decided to defer its publication for fear of antagonizing both Americans and Filipinos. In 1909 a second attempt was made to publish the volumes when President Taft's former secretary James A. LeRoy wrote a scathing critique objecting to its publication. The Bureau of Insular Affairs then abandoned the project. It was subsequently published in the Philippines in 1968 by the Eugenio Lopez Foundation.

John R. M. Taylor was not shy in stating his opinions. "The mass of the people of the Philippines – the men who work and have no desire to live from contributions levied upon their neighbors – welcomed the crushing of the Katipunan." Also more damaging: "The government which Aguinaldo established did not represent the aspirations of the men who were best entitled to be consulted. He played upon his people as an instrument... he deceived the Spaniards, the Americans, and the Filipinos in Hong Kong alive; fraud and murder were the instruments upon which he relied to cut out the path for his ambition."

In the 1968 foreword to the publication of John Taylor's magnum opus, historian Renato Constantino wrote that notwithstanding the openly anti-Filipino bias, the collection of original documents itself would "make available to Philippine scholars a part of the voluminous file of original documents of the Philippine Revolution."

== Re-evaluation ==
In 2002 American historian John M. Gates (College of Wooster, Ohio) wrote: "Capt. Taylor paid a severe penalty for his attempt to write the history of a highly controversial event. A victim of political censorship, he died never knowing how important his work would become to a future generation of scholars.

In June 2007 Filipiniana.net, a "digital library" website of material related to the Philippines, published a "Virtual Philippine Revolutionary Records" web page.

== Personal ==
Taylor was born into a distinguished military family. He was named after his uncle Union Army Brevet Major John Rodgers Meigs, who had been killed during the Civil War three months before he was born. His paternal grandfather was Army Brigadier General Joseph P. Taylor, the younger brother of President Zachary Taylor. His maternal grandfather was Army Brevet Major General Montgomery C. Meigs and his younger brother was Navy Admiral Montgomery M. Taylor. After his 1949 death in Washington, D.C., he was buried at Arlington National Cemetery on 5 April 1949.
