= Montgomery District =

Administrative district in British India

Coordinates: 30°35′N 73°20′E

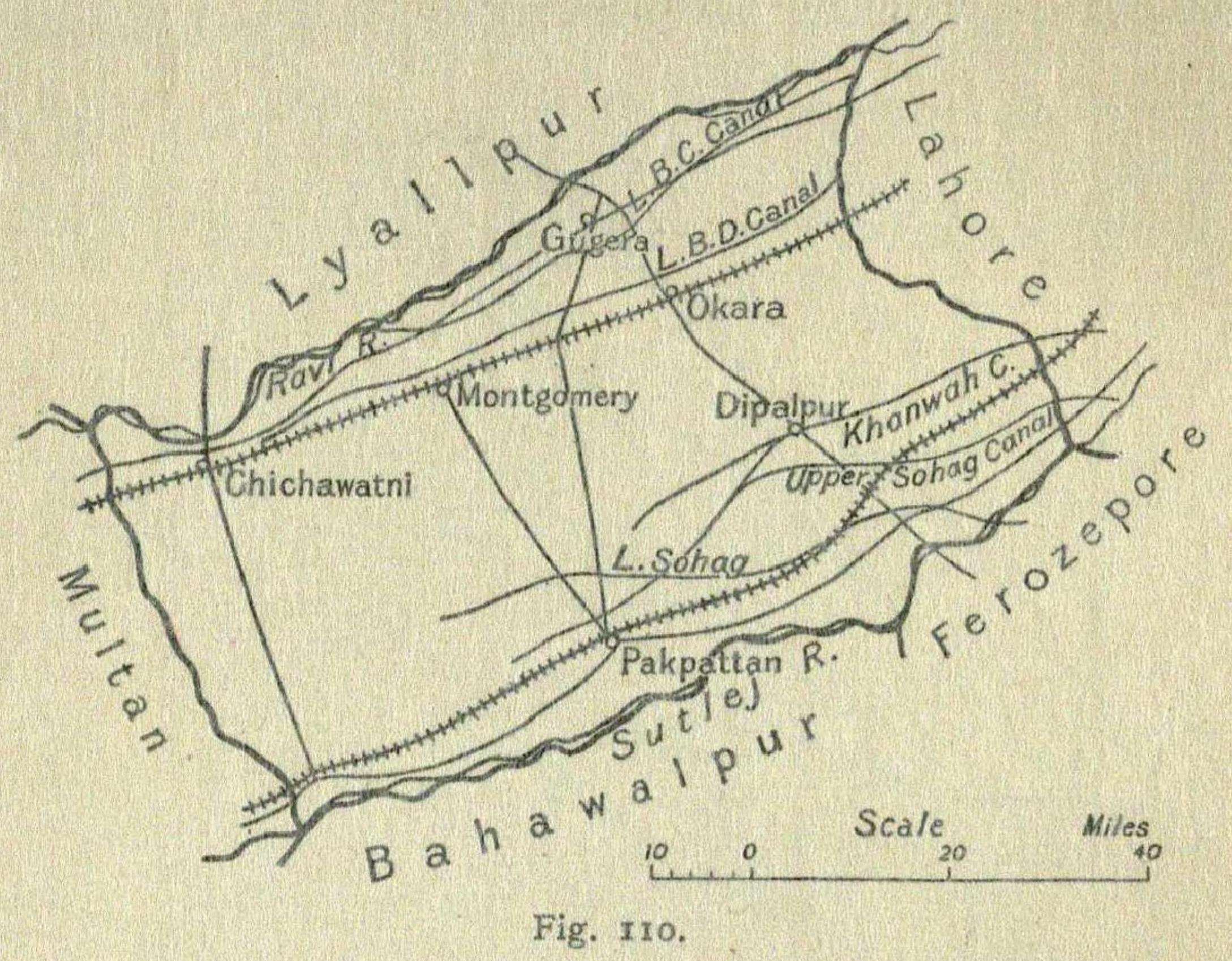
Map of Montgomery district of Punjab Province, British India, published in 'The Panjab, North-West Frontier Province and Kashmir' (1916)

Montgomery District was an administrative division of the former Punjab Province of British India, in what is now Pakistan. Named after Sir Robert Montgomery, it lay in the Bari Doab, or the tract between the Sutlej and the Ravi rivers, extending also across the Ravi into the Rechna Doab, which lies between the Ravi and the Chenab. The administrative headquarters was the town of Montgomery, present-day Sahiwal. In 1967, the name of Montgomery District was changed to Sahiwal District.

== History ==
The population according to the 1901 census of India was 463,586, a decrease of 0.4% in the decade due to emigration to the Chenab Colony. The principal crops in the early 20th century were wheat, pulse, cotton and fodder; camels were bred for export. The leading industries were cotton, silk and lacquered woodwork, and there were factories for ginning and pressing cotton. The district was traversed by the main line of the North-Western Railway, from Lahore to Multan; it is irrigated by the Upper Sutlej inundation canal system and also from the Ravi.

The Rechna Doab was long home to the pastoral Jats, who had constantly maintained a sturdy independence against the successive rulers of northern India. The sites of Kamalia and Harappa contain large mounds of antique bricks and other ruins left by the Indus Valley Civilisation, while many other remains of ancient cities or villages lie scattered along the river bank, or dotted the then-barren stretches of the central waste. In 997 CE, Sultan Mahmud Ghaznavi, took over the Ghaznavid dynasty empire established by his father, Sultan Sebuktegin, In 1005 he conquered the Shahis in Kabul in 1005, and followed it by the conquests of northern Punjab region. The Delhi Sultanate and later Mughal Empire ruled the region. The Punjab region became predominantly Muslim due to missionary Sufi saints whose dargahs dot the landscape of Punjab region. After the decline of the Mughal Empire, the Sikh Empire invaded and occupied Sahiwal. The pastoral tribes of this barren expanse did not appear to have paid more than a nominal allegiance to the Muslim rulers, and even in the 19th century, when Ranjit Singh extended the Sikh supremacy as far as Multan, the population for the most part remained in a chronic state of rebellion. In 1847 British influence was first exercised in the district when an officer was deputed to effect a summary settlement of the land revenue. Direct British rule was commenced on the annexation of the Punjab in 1849.

During the Indian Rebellion of 1857, there was a general rising of the Jat clans, the District formed the scene of the only rising which took place north of the Sutlej. Before the end of May, emissaries from Delhi crossed the river from Sirsa and Hissar, where open rebellion was already rife, and met with a ready reception from the Kharrals and other fierce Jat clans. The District authorities, however, kept down the threatened rising till August 26, when the prisoners in jail made a desperate attempt to break loose. At the same time Ahmad Khan, a famous Kharral leader, who had been detained at Gogera, broke his arrest, and, though apprehended, was released on security, together with several other suspected chieftains. On September 16 they fled to their homes, and the whole country rose in open rebellion. Kamalia was sacked; and Major Chamberlain, moving up with a small force from Multan, was besieged for some days at Chichawatni on the Ravi. The situation at the civil station remained critical till Colonel Paton arrived with substantial reinforcements from Lahore. An attack which took place immediately after their arrival was repulsed. Several minor actions followed in the open field, until finally the rebels, driven from the plain into the wildest jungles of the interior, were utterly defeated and dispersed. The British troops then inflicted severe punishment on the insurgent clans, destroying their villages, and seizing large numbers of cattle for sale.

The district was also home to the 71st Punjabis, a short-lived unit that uniquely among Indian army recruits were drawn from Punjab's Christian population.

The district was part of the Lahore Division of Punjab Province. The predominantly Muslim population supported Muslim League and Pakistan Movement. After the independence of Pakistan in 1947, the minority Hindus and Sikhs migrated to India while the Muslim refugees from India settled in the Montgomery District.

In 1967, the name of Montgomery District was changed to Sahiwal District.

== Administration ==
The district was administratively subdivided into 4 tehsils, these were:

- Montgomery
- Gogera
- Depalpur
- Pakpattan

== Boundaries ==
The district had an area of 4,771 sq mi (12,360 km^{2}) and included the present-day districts of Sahiwal, Pakpattan, Okara, and portions of Shekhupura, Faisalabad, Toba Tek Singh, and Vehari.

It was bounded by the Districts of Lahore on the north-east, Jhang on the north-west, and Multan on the south-west, while on the south-east it bordered the Native State of Bahawalpur and the British District of Firozpur.

In the former tract a fringe of cultivated lowland skirted the bank of either river, but the whole interior upland consisted of a desert plateau partially overgrown with brushwood and coarse grass, and impenetrable jungle in places. On the farther side of the Ravi, again, the country at once assumed the same desert aspect.

== Demographics ==
Religious groups in Montgomery District (British Punjab province era)
Religious group	1881		1891		1901		1911		1921		1931		1941	
Religious group	Pop.	%	Pop.	%	Pop.	%	Pop.	%	Pop.	%	Pop.	%	Pop.	%
Islam	330,495	77.48%	361,923	72.45%	334,474	72.15%	399,723	74.67%	513,055	71.88%	697,542	69.77%	918,564	69.11%
Hinduism (Note: 1931-1941: Including Ad-Dharmis)	83,974	19.69%	121,481	24.32%	109,945	23.72%	66,803	12.48%	94,791	13.28%	136,783	13.68%	210,966	15.87%
Sikhism	11,964	2.8%	16,032	3.21%	19,092	4.12%	68,175	12.74%	95,520	13.38%	148,155	14.82%	175,064	13.17%
Christianity	93	0.02%	85	0.02%	66	0.01%	581	0.11%	10,408	1.46%	17,245	1.72%	24,432	1.84%
Zoroastrianism	2	0%	0	0%	1	0%	4	0%	0	0%	7	0%	4	0%
Jainism	1	0%	0	0%	8	0%	13	0%	12	0%	38	0%	49	0%
Buddhism	0	0%	0	0%	0	0%	0	0%	0	0%	2	0%	3	0%
Judaism	—N/a	—N/a	0	0%	0	0%	0	0%	0	0%	0	0%	0	0%
Others	0	0%	0	0%	0	0%	0	0%	0	0%	0	0%	21	0%
Total population	426,529	100%	499,521	100%	463,586	100%	535,299	100%	713,786	100%	999,772	100%	1,329,103	100%
Note1: British Punjab province era district borders are not an exact match in the present-day due to various bifurcations to district borders — which since created new districts — throughout the historic Punjab Province region during the post-independence era that have taken into account population increases. Note2: Presently known as Sahiwal District, following district renaming in 1978.

Religion in the Tehsils of Montgomery District (1921)
Tehsil	Islam		Hinduism		Sikhism		Christianity		Jainism		Others (Note: Including Buddhism, Zoroastrianism, Judaism, Tribals, others, or not stated)		Total	
Tehsil	Pop.	%	Pop.	%	Pop.	%	Pop.	%	Pop.	%	Pop.	%	Pop.	%
Montgomery Tehsil	156,965	70.49%	37,080	16.65%	23,737	10.66%	4,887	2.19%	6	0%	0	0%	222,675	100%
Okara Tehsil	104,015	69.94%	15,091	10.15%	24,481	16.46%	5,123	3.44%	6	0%	0	0%	148,716	100%
Dipalpur Tehsil	151,572	75.42%	20,106	10%	29,210	14.53%	90	0.04%	0	0%	0	0%	200,978	100%
Pakpattan Tehsil	100,503	71.07%	22,514	15.92%	18,092	12.79%	308	0.22%	0	0%	0	0%	141,417	100%
Note: British Punjab province era tehsil borders are not an exact match in the present-day due to various bifurcations to tehsil borders — which since created new tehsils — throughout the historic Punjab Province region during the post-independence era that have taken into account population increases.

Religion in the Tehsils of Montgomery District (1941)
Tehsil	Islam		Hinduism		Sikhism		Christianity		Jainism		Others (Note: Including Anglo-Indian Christians, British Christians, Buddhism, Zoroastrianism, Judaism, Tribals, others, or not stated)		Total	
Tehsil	Pop.	%	Pop.	%	Pop.	%	Pop.	%	Pop.	%	Pop.	%	Pop.	%
Montgomery Tehsil	289,161	67.56%	71,018	16.59%	55,258	12.91%	12,265	2.87%	33	0.01%	294	0.07%	428,029	100%
Okara Tehsil	203,602	69.58%	41,008	14.01%	39,682	13.56%	8,288	2.83%	10	0%	37	0.01%	292,627	100%
Dipalpur Tehsil	210,835	76.68%	37,743	13.73%	26,077	9.48%	314	0.11%	0	0%	3	0%	274,972	100%
Pakpattan Tehsil	214,966	64.46%	61,197	18.35%	54,047	16.21%	3,234	0.97%	6	0%	25	0.01%	333,475	100%
Note1: British Punjab province era tehsil borders are not an exact match in the present-day due to various bifurcations to tehsil borders — which since created new tehsils — throughout the historic Punjab Province region during the post-independence era that have taken into account population increases. Note2: Tehsil religious breakdown figures for Christianity only includes local Christians, labeled as "Indian Christians" on census. Does not include Anglo-Indian Christians or British Christians, who were classified under "Other" category.
