= Stabilization, Security, Transition, and Reconstruction Operations =

U.S. military operations meant to secure a new social order in failed states

Stabilization, Security, Transition, and Reconstruction Operations (SSTRO) are a U.S. Department of Defense doctrinal concept. They are military operations designed to establish a safe, secure environment and simultaneously work with the inter-agency, coalition, multinational, and host nation partners to support the establishment of a new domestic social order in countries where a national government is weak, corrupt, incompetent and has no governing authority.

A triggering shock can seriously exacerbate the already difficult situation, producing widespread suffering, growing popular grievance, and often civil unrest, all of which can be intensified by several interrelated factors: the absence of key government functions, widespread lawlessness, poor economic performance, pronounced economic disparities, and in some cases, a serious external threat.

Once such difficult conditions emerge, the drivers of instability and conflict tend to reinforce one another, creating a degenerating cycle in which conditions continue to deteriorate, and the feelings of insecurity and the grievances of the local population intensify. Without a countervailing force to break this cycle, these developments can eventually destabilize the interlinked political, economic, and social systems that make up the fabric of a society.

== See also ==
- Irregular Warfare
- Irregular military
- Asymmetric warfare
