= Capital Liverpool =

Coordinates: 53.40315°N 2.99048°W

- Liverpool; United Kingdom
- Broadcast area: Merseyside
- Frequencies: FM: 107.6 MHz; DAB: 10C
- RDS: CAPITAL
- Branding: Liverpool's No.1 Hit Music Station

Programming
- Format: CHR
- Network: Capital

Ownership
- Owner: Global
- Sister stations: Capital Cymru; Capital London; Capital Manchester and Lancashire; Capital Mid-Counties; Capital Midlands; Capital North East; Capital North West and Wales; Capital Scotland; Capital South; Capital South Wales; Capital Yorkshire; Capital UK; Capital Xtra; Heart North West; Smooth North West

History
- First air date: 18 January 2016

Technical information
- Licensing authority: Ofcom

Links
- Webcast: Global Player
- Website: Capital Liverpool

Capital Liverpool is an Independent Local Radio station serving Liverpool, England. It is owned and operated by Global as part of the Capital network.

== History ==
=== Crash FM ===
The station was launched by Janice Long and Bernie Connor as Liverpool's answer to XFM, with the idea for an alternative music radio station being thought up by the pair at Keith’s Wine Bar on Lark Lane in 1994. Crash FM acquired a restricted service licence (RSL) to broadcast for a month from 5 November 1995, with the studios at Mabel Fletcher College on Greenbank, seeing presenters such as Inspiral Carpets member Clint Boon take to the airwaves.

After a few more RSL broadcasts, the station relaunched on 107.6FM as a full time service, from studios at 27 Fleet Street, on 27 March 1998. Now known as 107 Crash FM, the station had backing from Bob Geldof, Primal Scream, Urban Splash, Kiss 102's Mike Gray and Boy George.

In its application for a full-time licence, Crash FM said it would provide an alternative rock and dance station, aimed at 15- to 34-year-olds, with a target audience of over 80,000 tuning in for around eight hours per week in the first year. The original shareholders also included CLT, although they withdrew before launch with their 25% stake taken by Channel Radio.

=== Juice 107.6 ===
Crash was bought out by Forever Broadcasting in late 1999 and relaunched as Juice 107.6 on 26 March 2000. By September of that year, the station's RAJAR had increased significantly, after its format had been altered to include more mainstream pop and dance music.

In September 2003, Juice was sold to Absolute Radio (UK) Limited (AR-UK), a consortium made up of UTV Media and Eurocast, for £3.1m. AR-UK were, at the time, making moves in the FM radio licence world, notably in the West Midlands and Glasgow. The new owners aimed to develop more local programming, news and marketing but sold the station to UTV less than two years later.

On 12 January 2012, Juice switched from its Fleet Street studios to a new £1.1m facility at One Park West in Liverpool One, overlooking the Albert Dock.

=== Capital Liverpool ===
On 5 June 2015, Juice FM was sold again to Global for £10 million. The sale was given regulatory approval from the Competition and Markets Authority exactly three months later, following a consultation.

On the same day as the sale was cleared, Global announced it would rebrand and relaunch Juice FM as part of the Capital network of contemporary hit radio stations.

The Juice FM brand was phased out at 4pm on 10 January 2016, with the station entering a transition period ahead of the full relaunch as Capital, which took place at 6am on 18 January 2016.

According to RAJAR, Capital Liverpool's listening figures fell to 167,000 listeners per week a year after the rebrand. But as of RAJAR Q2 2019, after significant changes to the initial lineup, the numbers had recovered to 212,000 weekly listeners.

On 26 February 2019, Global confirmed the station's local breakfast and weekend shows would be replaced with networked programming from April 2019. The weekday drivetime show was retained alongside local news bulletins, traffic updates and advertising. Three of Capital Liverpool's presenters left the station.

=== Digital radio ===
Juice FM was not present on the Bauer-operated central Liverpool DAB multiplex, but did subsequently procure a slot on MuxCo's more recent multiplex serving Cheshire, the Wirral and northeast Wales. Following the relaunch as Capital Liverpool, the station took the place of Capital's 97.1 FM Wirral service on the Bauer Liverpool multiplex.

Capital Liverpool remained on MuxCo's multiplex until August 2016, when the slot was transferred to the 103.4 FM Wrexham/Chester version of Capital.

== Programming ==
All programming is broadcast and produced from Global's London headquarters.

Global's Manchester newsroom broadcasts hourly localised news updates from 6am-6pm on weekdays and 8am-12pm at weekends.

== Previous presenters ==
- Christian O'Connell (now at Gold 104.3)
- Vic McGlynn
- Janice Long (deceased)
- Graeme Smith
- Dave Whelan
- Anton Powers
