= Montgomery Tahsil =

Montgomery Tahsil was an administrative subdivision of Montgomery District in Punjab province of British India. The tahsil was located between 30°16' and 31°2' N. and 72°27' and 73°26'E on both banks of the Ravi River, with an area of 1,472 square miles.

The population according to the census of 1901 was 76,573, compared with 93,648 in 1891, a decrease of almost 20,000. The decrease being due to migration into the Chenab Colony. The tahsil contained the towns of Montgomery (1901 population, 6,602), the headquarters, and Kamalia (6,976); and 218 villages. The land revenue and cesses in 1903-4 amounted to Rs. 78,000.

The greater part of the tahsil was uncultivated. It included on the south a narrow strip of the Sutlej valley, from which it rises abruptly into the desert uplands lying between the old banks of the Beds and the Ravi. Farther north lie the Ravi lowlands, interspersed with great stretches of jungle, and, beyond the river, sloping gently upwards towards the fertile plateau irrigated by the Chenab Canal. Cultivation is confined to the lands along the river, and a few scattered patches round the wells elsewhere. The scanty cultivation accounted for the low density of population, 52 persons per square mile.
