= Montgomery Meigs (born 1945) =

Recipient of the Purple Heart medal (1945–2021)

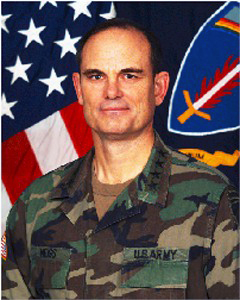
- Meigs in c. 2002
- Born: Montgomery Cunningham Meigs; 11 January 1945; Annapolis, Maryland, U.S.
- Died: 6 July 2021 (aged 76); Austin, Texas, U.S.
- Relatives: Montgomery Cunningham Meigs (father); Montgomery C. Meigs (granduncle)
- Military career
- Allegiance: United States
- Branch: United States Army
- Service years: 1967–2002
- Rank: General
- Commands: United States Army Europe; Seventh United States Army; 1st Armored Division; 3rd Infantry Division; 1st Infantry Division
- Conflicts: Vietnam War; Gulf War: Operation Desert Storm; Battle of Al Busayyah; Battle of Medina Ridge; Bosnian War: Operation Joint Endeavor; Operation Joint Guard
- Awards: Army Distinguished Service Medal; Legion of Merit (2); Bronze Star Medal; Purple Heart
- Other work: Professor at Syracuse University and Georgetown University; CEO of Business Executives for National Security

Montgomery Cunningham Meigs (11 January 1945 – 6 July 2021) was a United States Army general. He was named for his triple great-granduncle, Quartermaster General Montgomery C. Meigs, the father of Arlington National Cemetery, and for his father Lieutenant Colonel Montgomery Meigs, a World War II tank commander who was killed in action one month before Meigs was born.

== Early life and education ==
Meigs graduated from the Holderness School in Holderness, New Hampshire, in 1963 and went on to United States Military Academy at West Point, New York, where he graduated in 1967. He served as a cavalry troop commander in the Vietnam War with the 9th Infantry Division. After study at the University of Wisconsin–Madison and a year at the Army's Command and General Staff College, he taught in the History Department at West Point and spent the 1981–82 academic year at Massachusetts Institute of Technology as an International Affairs Fellow of the Council on Foreign Relations.

== Military career ==
Meigs visiting a coalition basecamp in Bosnia and Herzegovina

Meigs received his PhD in history from Wisconsin in 1982 before reporting to 2nd Armored Cavalry Regiment as its executive officer. In 1984, Meigs commanded the 1st Squadron, 1st Armored Cavalry Regiment. Following a stint at the National War College as an Army Fellow, he worked as a strategic planner on the Joint Staff in Washington, D.C. for three years. In 1988–1989, he attended MIT Seminar XXI. Returning to Germany, he assumed command of the 2nd Brigade, 1st Armored Division on 26 September 1990, and commanded it through Operation Desert Storm. He subsequently commanded the 7th Army Training Command in Grafenwoehr and served as Chief of Staff of V Corps and Deputy Chief of Staff for Operations of the United States Army, Europe, and 7th Army. Meigs commanded the 3rd Infantry Division from July 1995 until its reflagging as the 1st Infantry Division in February 1996. In October, he deployed with the 1st Infantry Division to Bosnia, serving nine months in command of NATO's Multi-National Division (North) in Operations Joint Endeavor and Joint Guard.

Meigs commanded the NATO Stabilisation Force in Bosnia and Herzegovina from 23 October 1998 to October 1999, concurrent with his command of United States Army Europe/7th Army.

Meigs was the commander-in-chief of the United States Army Europe and Africa until his retirement in 2002.

== Post-military career ==
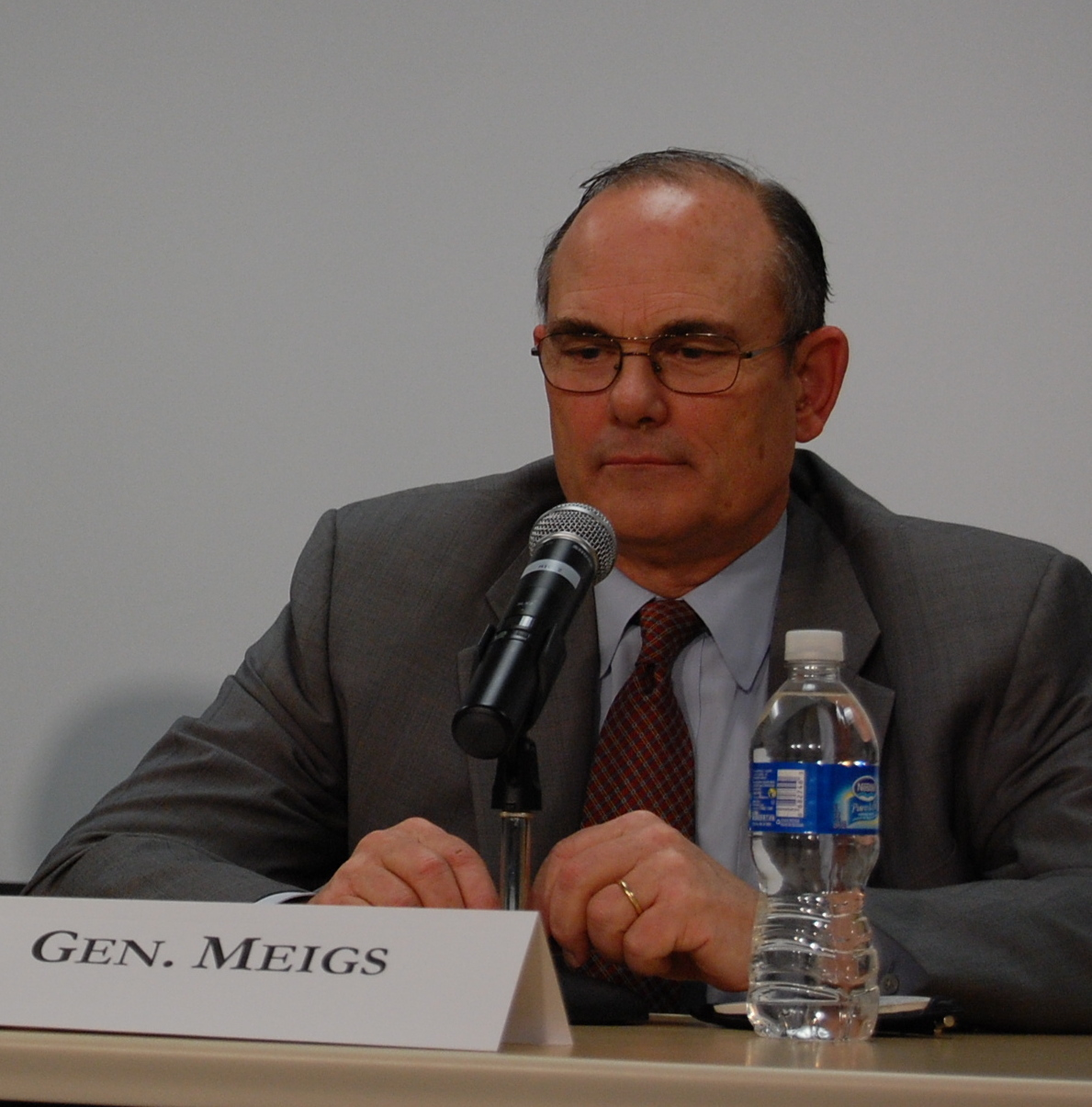
Meigs in 2010

After Meigs left active military service, he was a professor at the Maxwell School at Syracuse University and served as a military consultant to The Pentagon. In 2008 he returned to NBC News as a military consultant.

In December 2007, Meigs left his previous position as the director of the United States Department of Defense's Joint Improvised Explosive Device Defeat Organization (JIEDDO). He was a visiting professor of Strategy and Military Operations at Georgetown University's School of Foreign Service and held positions at Mitre Corporation, International Executive Service Corps, and the LBJ School of Public Affairs at The University of Texas at Austin.

From 1 January 2010 to 25 July 2013, Meigs served as president and chief executive officer of Business Executives for National Security (BENS), a nonprofit composed of senior business executives who volunteer to help address national security challenges.

He died on 6 July 2021, in Austin, Texas.

== Awards and decorations ==
Meigs' awards include the Army Distinguished Service Medal, the Legion of Merit with oak leaf cluster, the Bronze Star Medal with "V" device, and the Purple Heart.

== Author ==
- Meigs, Montgomery C. (1990). Slide Rules and Submarines: American Scientists and Subsurface Warfare in World War II. National Defense University Press. p. 269. ISBN 9780160185915.
  - University Press of the Pacific (2002, ISBN 978-0-89875-905-1)

Military offices
Preceded by Leonard D. Holder, Jr.	Commandants of the United States Army Command and General Staff College; 7 August 1997 – 22 October 1998	Succeeded by William M. Steele
Preceded by Eric K. Shinseki	Commanding General of United States Army Europe; 10 November 1998 – 3 December 2002	Succeeded by Burwell B. Bell III
