= Montgomery Cunningham Meigs (1919–1944) =

United States Army officer (1919–1944)

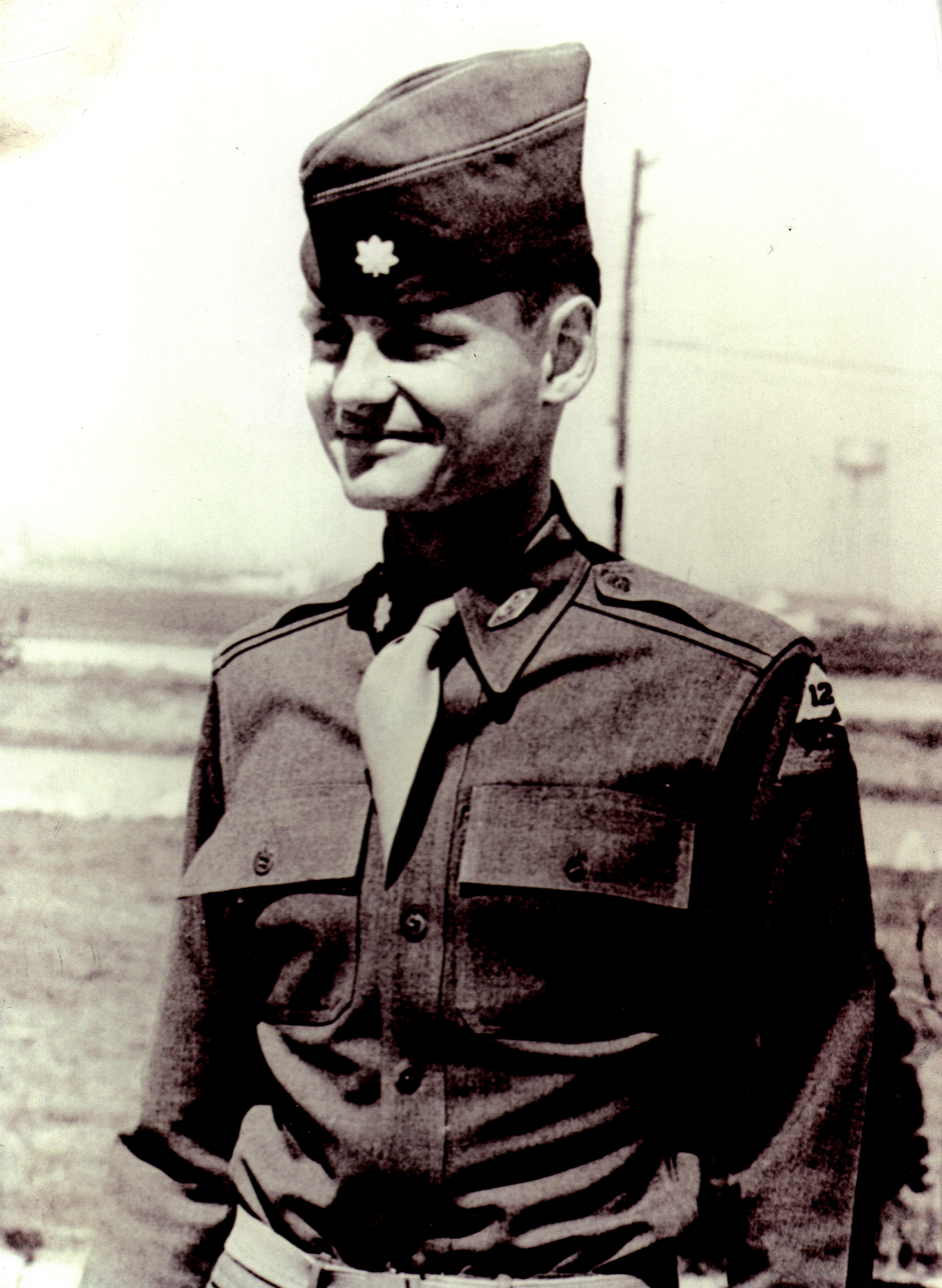
- Lieutenant Colonel Montgomery Cunningham Meigs, c. 1942
- Born: October 8, 1919; Weston, Massachusetts, United States
- Died: December 11, 1944 (aged 25); Rohrbach, France
- Burial place: Lorraine American Cemetery
- Relatives: Montgomery Meigs (son); Montgomery C. Meigs (granduncle)
- Military career
- Allegiance: United States
- Branch: United States Army
- Service years: 1940–1944
- Rank: Lieutenant Colonel
- Nicknames: "Monty", "Mont"
- Commands: 23rd Tank Battalion, 12th Armored Division
- Conflicts: World War II: Battle of the Bulge
- Awards: Silver Star; Purple Heart

Montgomery Cunningham Meigs (/ˈmɛɡz/; August 10, 1919 – December 11, 1944) was a lieutenant colonel in the United States Army and commander of a tank battalion during World War II. He is the great-great-grandnephew of Montgomery C. Meigs, Quartermaster of the Union Army during the American Civil War, and father of General Montgomery Meigs (1945–2021). He was killed in action during the first weeks of battle faced by the 12th Armored Division during the liberation of Alsace in France.

== Early life and education ==
Meigs was the youngest of three sons of Commander John Forsyth Meigs of the United States Navy (1890–1963) and Elisabeth Hubbard Meigs (1894–1991). He was born in Weston, Massachusetts, and due to his father's naval posting, he attended 8 different schools, graduating from the Brent School in Baguio, Philippines, and attended the United States Military Academy at West Point, New York, graduating 44th in his class in 1940. During the latter part of his school career he was handicapped by a painful back injury which kept him in a plaster cast for six months and in an iron brace for a year.

== Military career ==
Upon graduation from West Point in 1940, Meigs chose to enter the cavalry and first served in the 8th Cavalry Regiment, at Fort Bliss, Texas. In 1941, he was transferred to the 2nd Armored Division and in 1942 to the 7th Armored Division, serving as an MP at Fort Polk, Louisiana. While in these two divisions he was seriously and painfully injured in motorcycle accidents, first with a broken neck vertebra and second with a broken knee.

Meigs recuperated at Walter Reed General Hospital, and met several survivors of the Doolittle Raid on Tokyo. He was given command of the 23rd Tank Battalion of the 12th Armored Division after his second discharge from the hospital, and went overseas to the European Theater of Operations with the division in September 1944.

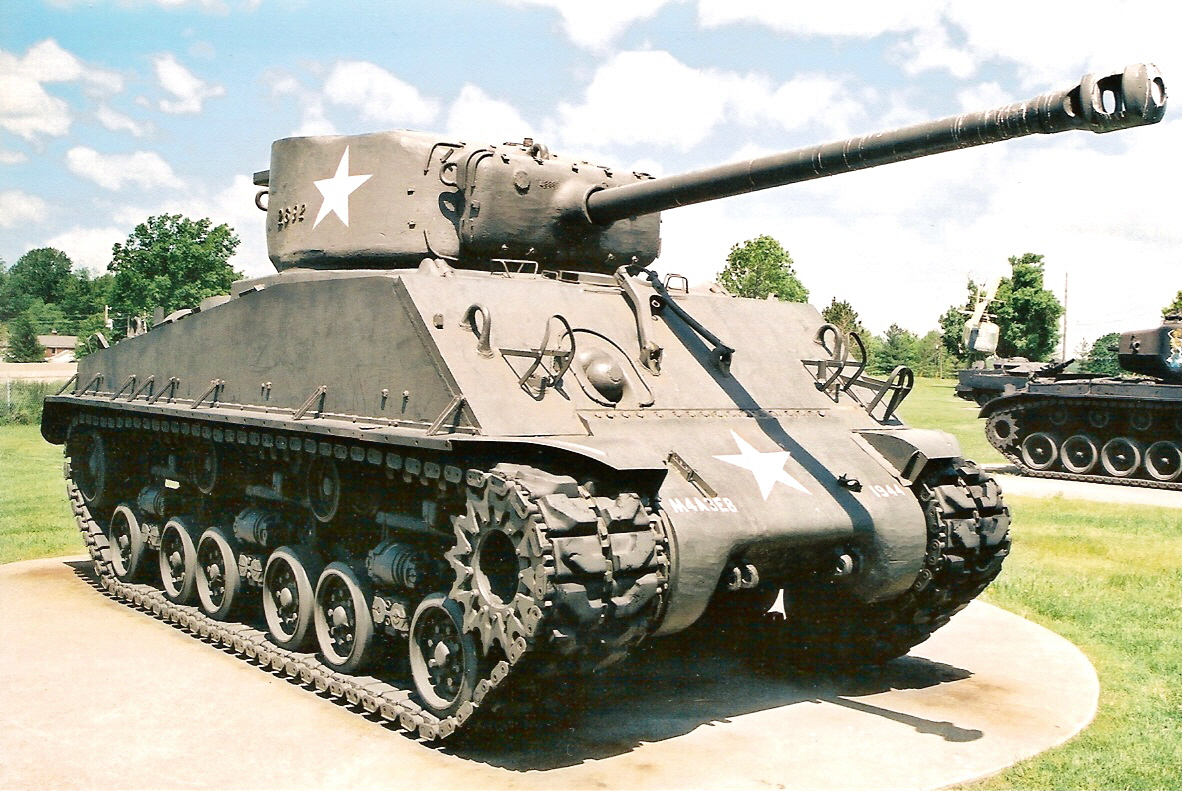
An M4A3E8 Sherman tank used by the 23rd Tank Battalion

The first mission given to the 23rd Tank Battalion was to support the 17th Armored Infantry Battalion (AIB) in attacking the barracks at Binning on December 9, 1944. A platoon of five tanks from Company A led by 1st Lieutenant Robert Seymour supported the infantry advance, while the rest of the tank battalion fired on the barracks from the flank. Leaving from Rohrbach at 0930, Colonel Meigs, with his S-2 Captain Virgil Thorp in the gunner's seat of the M-4 with a 75mm gun, advanced to a position on a ridge that allowed Meigs to observe and direct the fire. The tanks encountered anti-tank mines, and heavy artillery and mortar attacks from the 11th Panzer Division. "Never once did the colonel close his turret hatch. He would just duck his head when an enemy round would land near the tank and be right up again to observe the action of the enemy and his own forces."

The tanks held their position overnight, while Meigs walked back to division headquarters because the areas was heavily mined. One company commander was killed and another seriously wounded when they drove back to headquarters that night. While waiting to speak to General Ennis at division headquarters, Meigs found that his canteen on his pistol belt had been pierced by shrapnel.

Overnight, Meigs issued orders to his company commanders, notifying them that the 23rd Tank Battalion would be leading a task force attacking the Maginot Line north of Rohrbach. He returned to his tank which led the attack. Moving out from Oberstmuhl on December 10, the task force hit a mine field and turned south to Sinnesberg. They advanced under heavy fire to the Maginot Line defenses by 1500 hours, but were forced by increased anti-tank fire from concealed positions held by the 11th Panzer Division, and mounting casualties to fall back to a defiladed position overnight. Six tanks were lost in the engagement.

One G.I. (most likely from the 17th AIB, which together with the 23rd Tank Battalion and the 435th Armored Field Artillery, constituted Combat Command Reserve (CCR)) who was following Meigs' tank, was hit by an enemy artillery barrage. Meigs stopped his tank, dismounted, picked up the soldier and, with Captain Thorp, placed him on the deck of his tank. He ordered the tank to move to a position of cover from a large pillbox, where he personally administered first aid and morphine to the wounded soldier. He was evacuated later losing both legs but he lived due to the action of Meigs.

Orders for December 11, 1944, were to proceed through Rohrbach then take the road leading east to Bitche. Meigs, who had not slept in three days, was in the lead tank of the first assault wave, advanced 1,200 yards (1,100 m) onto a ridge which the Germans had "zeroed in" with well-concealed 88mm anti-tank artillery guns. The Germans unleashed "the most intense artillery barrage the 23rd had suffered". Three tanks were disabled and several exposed officers were killed. Due to the loss of the company commanders of B and C companies, two junior officers were made acting company commanders. One of them, 1st Lieutenant John Lee of Company B, would distinguish himself at the end of the war during the Battle for Castle Itter.

Meigs called a halt until the guns could be located and told the tanks to take cover. He ordered his tank driver to move forward until he could just see over the ridge without exposing the entire tank, into a hull defilade position. He observed a flash of light coming from the direction of Bettwiller and called for smoke on the edge of the town. He told the tank driver to back up, but at that moment, an anti-tank projectile went through the open hatch door and struck him, killing him instantly. Captain William Comfort, an S-3 officer, took temporary command of the battalion, until December 13 when Major William Edwards took command of the battalion. The 17th AIB advanced to the pillboxes of the Maginot Line but was pinned down at the front and left flank. Artillery fire directed by 12th AD liaison planes knocked out the pillboxes that were impeding the 17th advance.

The division accomplished its objectives by December 15, capturing Bettviller, Guising, Binning, Hoelling and Rohrbach. The division casualty report for the period of 7 through December 15, 1944, included six officers and 37 enlisted men killed, 16 officers and 141 enlisted men wounded. At least 10 tanks were lost in the first engagement of the war.

Meigs was posthumously awarded the Silver Star for "gallantry and extraordinary service". His citation states that:

Lieutenant Colonel Meigs' actions during the three days' operations under artillery, mortar, and small arms fire set an example for all officers and men of his battalion, inspiring them to continue the attack on the Division objective, which was taken on December 12, 1944. Lieutenant Colonel Meigs' courage and utter disregard for his own life in leading his battalion, exemplifies the finest traditions of the Armed Forces of the United States.

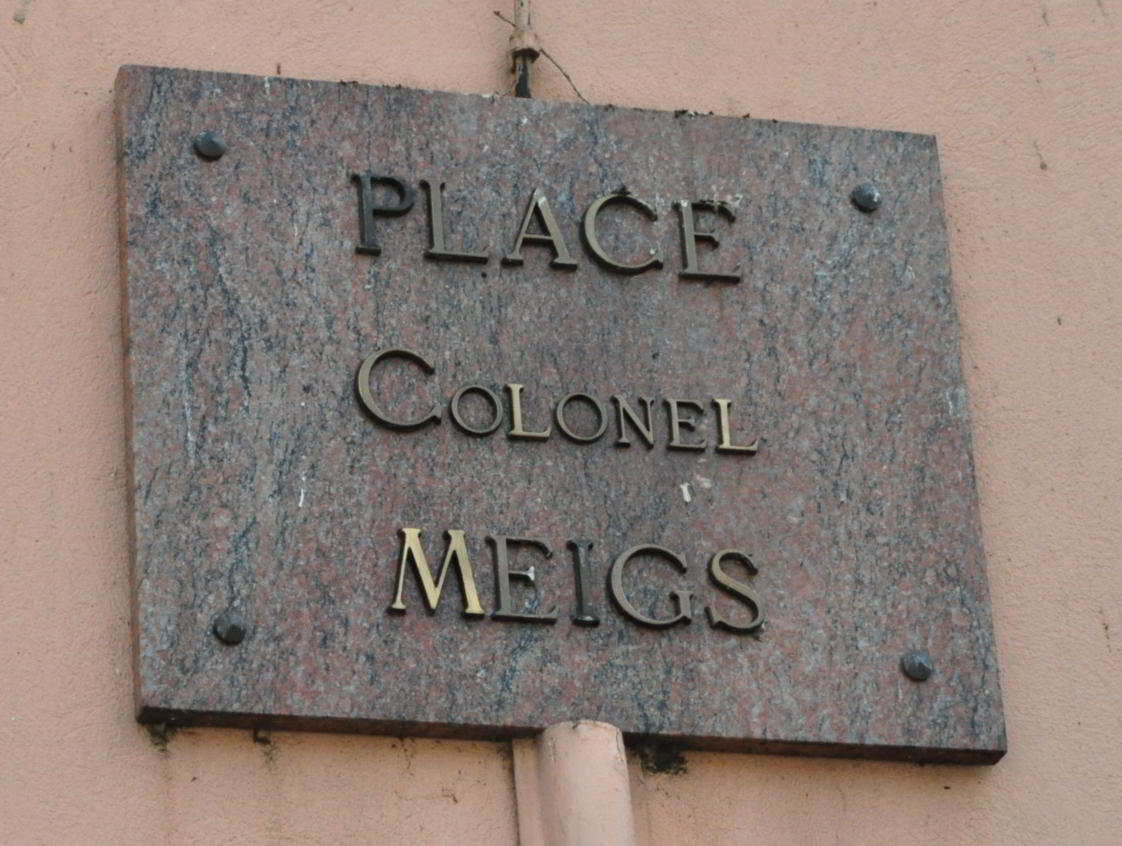
Place Colonel Meigs is located in Rohrbach, France near where Lt. Col. Montgomery C. Meigs died while commanding the 23rd Tank Bn, 12th Armored Div.

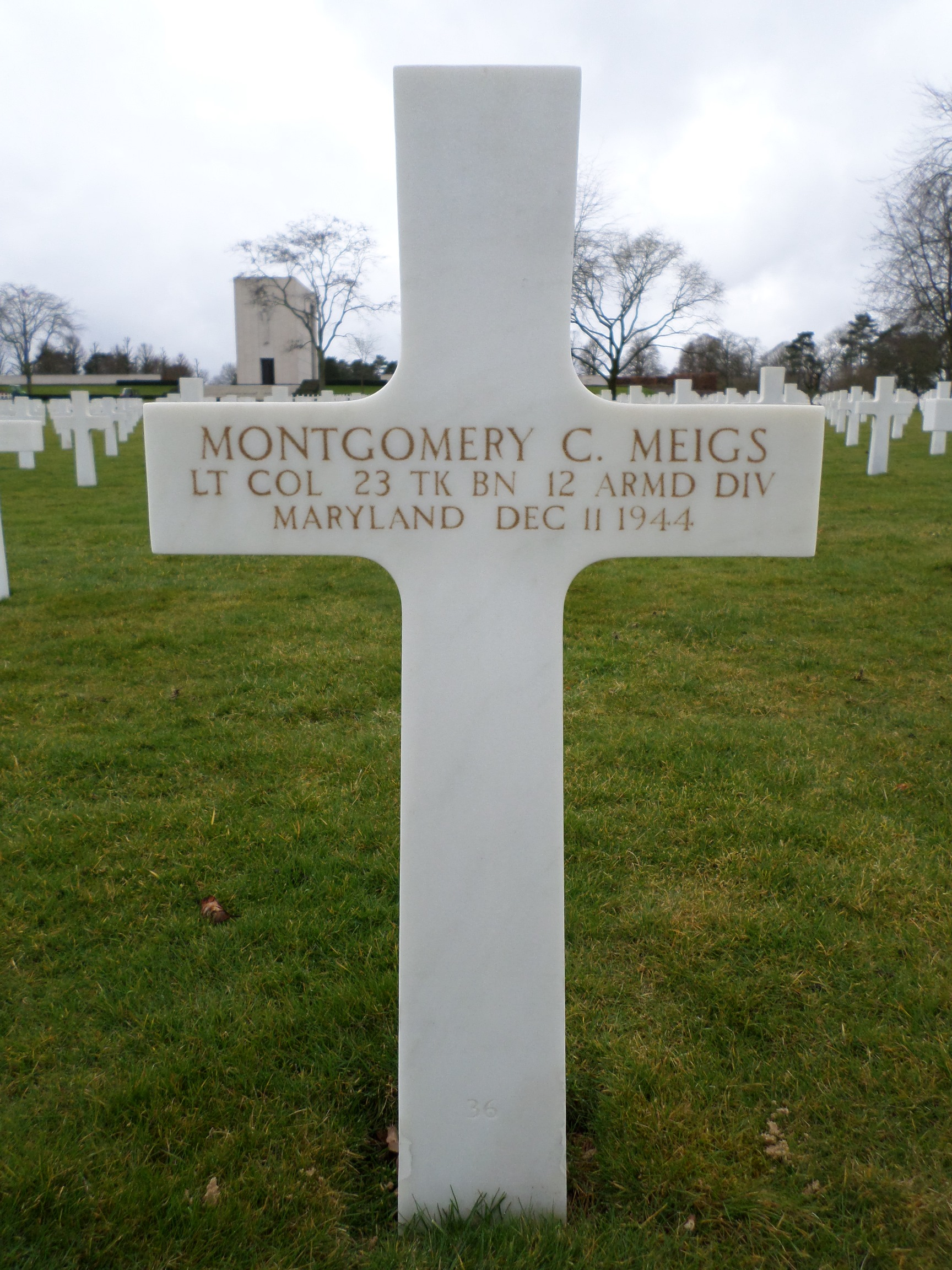
Grave marker of Lt. Col Meigs, Lorraine American Cemetery, Saint-Avold, Departement de la Moselle, Lorraine, France. Photo courtesy of CSM Dwight "Andy" Anderson (ret.), American Battle Monuments Commission.

== Personal life ==
Meigs had two older brothers, Captain Charles Hubbard Meigs (1915–2008), who served in the United States Navy, and John Forsyth Meigs (1917–1938). His nickname, like many of his namesakes was "Mont". He was married to Elizabeth Shoemaker Griggs on May 25, 1943, in Annapolis, Maryland. They had one son, Montgomery Meigs, who was born one month after his death, and went on to attend West Point and eventually become Commanding General of United States Army, Europe.

Meigs was a member of a long and distinguished military family. He is the father of General Montgomery Meigs (1945–2021), the son of Commander John Forsyth Meigs, Jr., son-in law of Captain John B. Griggs, brother of Commander Charles Hubbard Meigs, great-grandnephew of Brevet Major General Montgomery C. Meigs, nephew of Admiral Montgomery Meigs Taylor, cousin of Brevet Major John Rodgers Meigs, Brevet Colonel Return Jonathan Meigs, Jr., and Colonel Return Jonathan Meigs.
