= Montgomery M. Taylor =

United States Navy admiral (1869–1952)

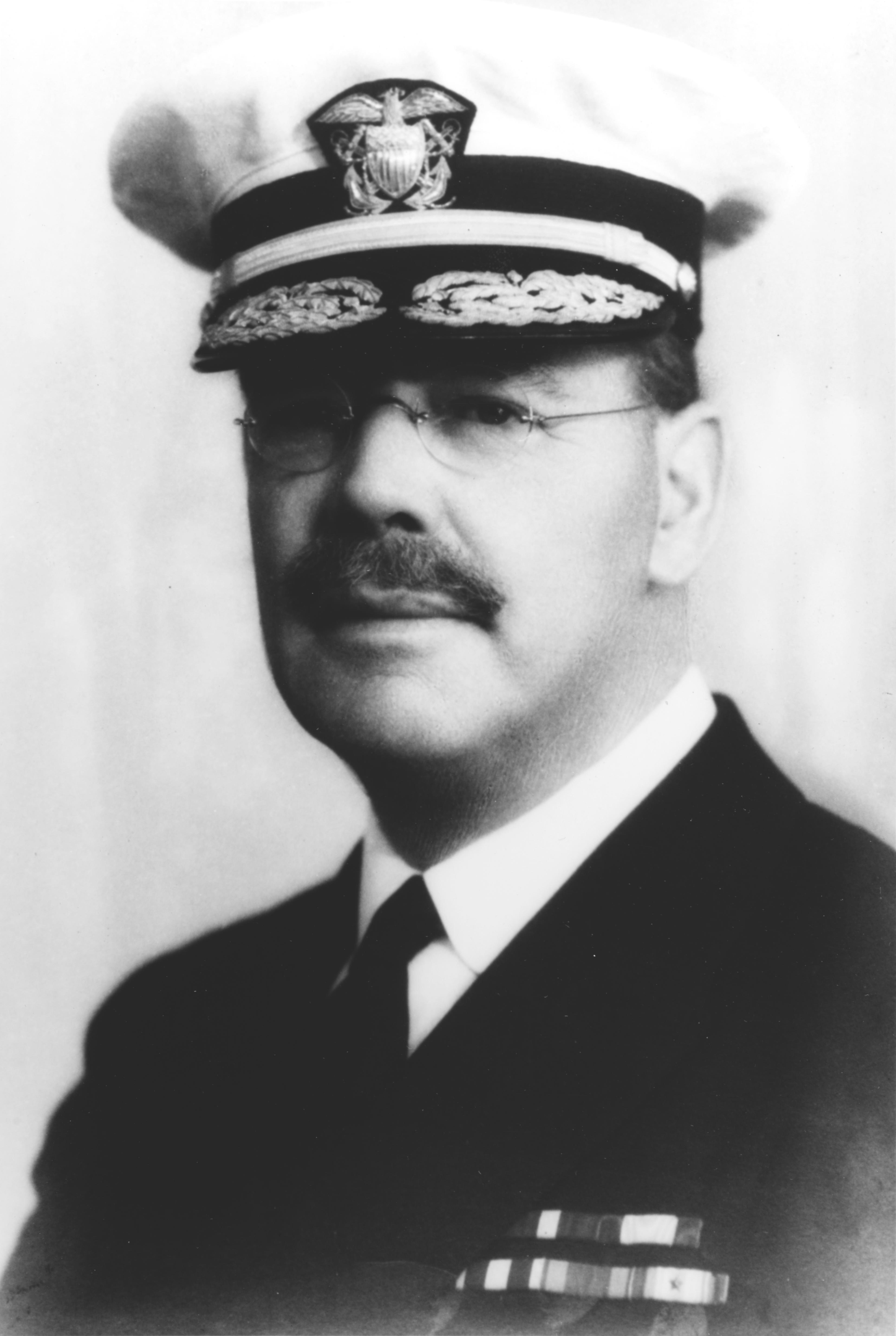
- Born: October 13, 1869; Washington, D.C., U.S.
- Died: October 21, 1952 (aged 83); Bethesda Naval Medical Center, Bethesda, Maryland, U.S.
- Burial place: Arlington National Cemetery
- Relatives: Zachary Taylor (great-uncle); Montgomery C. Meigs (grandfather); Montgomery Meigs (nephew)
- Military career
- Allegiance: United States of America
- Branch: United States Navy
- Service years: 1890–1936
- Rank: Admiral
- Commands: United States Asiatic Fleet; Control Fleet; Scouting Fleet
- Conflicts: Spanish–American War; World War I

Montgomery Meigs Taylor (13 October 1869 – 21 October 1952) was an admiral in the United States Navy. He served in the Navy from 1890 to 1933, fought in the Battle of Manila Bay during the Spanish–American War in 1898, and later commanded the Control Fleet and the Scouting Fleet. He served as commander-in-chief of the United States Asiatic Fleet from 1931 to 1933.

== Early life ==
Taylor was born on October 13, 1869, in Washington, D.C., to Joseph Hancock and Mary Meigs Taylor. He was born in the house of his grandfather, Montgomery C. Meigs, Quartermaster General of the United States Army during the American Civil War, for whom he was also named. His grand-uncle was President Zachary Taylor. His brother was John R. M. Taylor, an officer in the United States Army during the Philippine–American War.

Taylor grew up in Washington, D.C., where he attended public school.

== Naval career ==
=== Early assignments ===
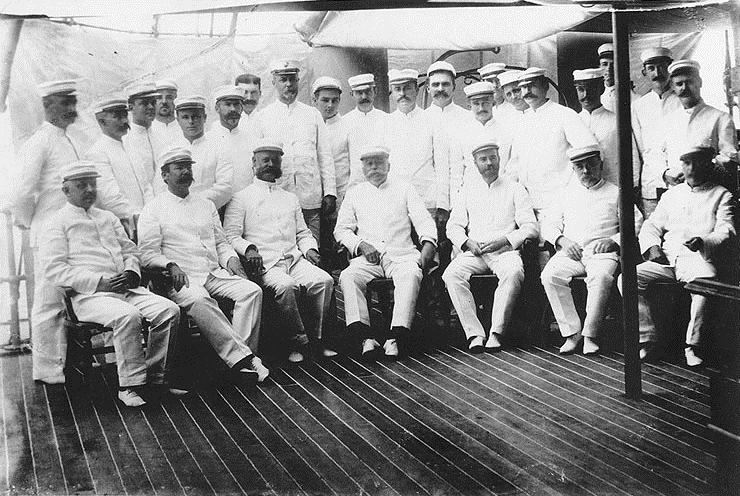
Rear Admiral George Dewey and officers and staff of Olympia while at anchor in Manila Bay. Taylor is standing at far left.

Taylor was appointed in 1886 to the United States Naval Academy, where he was an outstanding halfback on the first football team the school fielded. He graduated in 1890, and was to have trained aboard the armed steamer USS Galena, but she was wrecked before he could join her. He spent the next two years aboard the screw sloop USS Richmond, the screw sloop USS Enterprise, and finally the protected cruiser USS Chicago. He was appointed an ensign in 1892, and his first assignment was aboard the protected cruiser USS Baltimore. He also served short stints aboard the screw sloops USS Monongahela and USS Essex and the steamer USS Thetis.

Taylor was next assigned to the gunboat USS Yorktown. He traveled to Shanghai, China, via commercial steamer and joined the ship in the summer of 1900. Yorktown was ordered back to the United States on 10 September 1900. Taylor disembarked at Nagasaki, Japan, and joined the protected cruiser USS Olympia, Admiral George Dewey's flagship, in September 1897.

During the Spanish–American War of 1898, Taylor served as a battery commander aboard Olympia and took part in the Battle of Manila Bay on 1 May 1898. Taylor received a promotion to lieutenant after Olympia returned to the United States in 1899.

Taylor was assigned to the full-rigged ship USS Chesapeake in November 1899 for the ship's sea trials, but after a month was ordered to leave the ship and proceed to Washington, D.C., for coursework in modern armament. In February 1900, he successfully applied for sea duty in the Pacific. Over the next few years, Taylor served on several ships:

- Commanding officer, USS Pampanga from March 1900 to 1902 during the Philippine–American War.
- Commanding officer, gunboat USS Hopkins, from 1903 to 1905.
- Commanding officer, tender USS Siren
- Commanding officer, 2nd Torpedo Flotilla, United States Atlantic Fleet, from 1905 to 1906.
- Commanding officer, receiving ship USS Wabash, from 1906 to 1908.
- Executive officer, scout cruiser USS Salem, from 1908 to 1909.
- Executive officer, protected cruiser USS Milwaukee, from 1909 to 1910.
- Commanding officer, gunboat USS Petrel, from 1910 to 1911.

Talor was promoted to lieutenant commander on 1 July 1905 and to commander on 4 March 1911.

=== Rise in the ranks ===
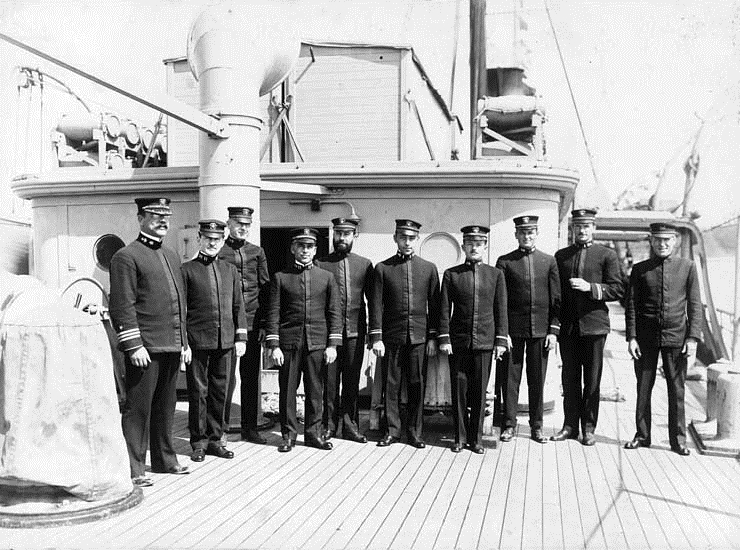
Lt. Commander Taylor (far left) aboard USS Buffalo during its Alaska expedition in 1914.

After 21 years at sea, Taylor received his first land assignment. He was appointed aide to the commandant of the Brooklyn Navy Yard in Brooklyn, New York, in 1911, and served there until 1913. He was given command of the auxiliary cruiser USS Buffalo in 1913, serving until 1915. Buffalo cruised through the Caribbean Sea and along the west coast of Central America before being ordered to Alaska. While in port at Kodiak, Alaska, Taylor learned that World War I had broken out in Europe in 1914.

From 1915 to 1916, Taylor attended the Naval War College in Newport, Rhode Island, with orders to report to the armored cruiser USS Colorado to serve as her commanding officer in the event of a national emergency. After graduating in 1916, he was promoted to captain on 16 August 1916 and given command of the battleship USS Maine.

After the United States entered World War I in 1917, Taylor was assigned duties in the Office of Naval Operations at the United States Department of the Navy. He took command of the battleship USS Florida in 1918. Florida operated in cooperation with the British Grand Fleet during the war, and Taylor received the Navy Distinguished Service Medal for this service.

Taylor was assigned to the staff of the Naval War College from 1919 to 1921. In June 1922 he became commander of the 15th Naval District and of the Naval Operating Base at Coco Solo in the Panama Canal Zone.

Taylor returned to the United States in 1923 and was appointed a member of the Naval Examining and Retiring Board in the Department of the Navy. In June 1923, he was appointed commander of the Control Fleet, a unit consisting of submarines, destroyers, and Marine Corps units designed to control sea lanes after they had been cleared of enemy forces by the Navy Battle Fleet.

=== Admiralty ===
Taylor was promoted to rear admiral on 1 October 1922. He was director of fleet training from 1925 to 1927, and afterward commanded the 3rd Battleship Division of the Battle Fleet, with the battleship USS Pennsylvania as his flagship. During fleet exercises in August 1927, he received an informal reprimand from his superior, Admiral Henry A. Wiley, (Commander-in-Chief, United States Fleet), for launching planes from aircraft carriers after confronting an enemy rather than using his ships' superior speed to escape. In September 1927, Taylor made Joseph J. Clark (later an admiral himself who played a significant role in the Battle of the Philippine Sea in June 1944) his division chief of staff.

Taylor was given command of the Scouting Fleet on 30 March 1926. The Scouting Fleet, based in the Atlantic Ocean, was an operational step down for Taylor. Although it contained two divisions of battleships, these were some of the Navy's oldest battleships, and the Scouting Fleet primarily consisted of cruiser and destroyer divisions. The old aircraft carrier USS Langley was also attached to the Scouting Fleet for aircraft training purposes. Taylor's job was to train the Scouting Fleet for scouting missions. He was promoted to vice admiral in the summer of 1928.

Taylor's command of the Scouting Fleet ended on March 8, 1929. He was succeeded by Rear Admiral William Carey Cole. Taylor was named chief of the War Plans Division of the Office of Naval Operations. Although energetic, deeply interested in Asia and the Pacific region, and a student of blockades and invasions, Taylor contributed little to war planning in these crucial years. According to naval historian Edward S. Miller, Taylor believed that Japan (a rising naval power in the Pacific) "deserved" American friendship, and that Japanese attempts to control Manchuria were a positive development. Naval historian Robert Love agrees, noting that Taylor deeply distrusted the Chinese and believed the Nationalist Government unwilling to defend its own territory. During this period, Taylor became good friends with Japanese Admiral Kichisaburo Nomura. While serving in the War Plans office, Taylor was appointed to the navy board assigned with selecting officers for promotion to admiral, commander, and captain. He also was appointed to the board of inquiry into comments made by Major General Smedley Butler (USMC) about an alleged crime committed by Benito Mussolini. Butler retired before the board finished its work.

=== Command of the Asiatic Fleet ===
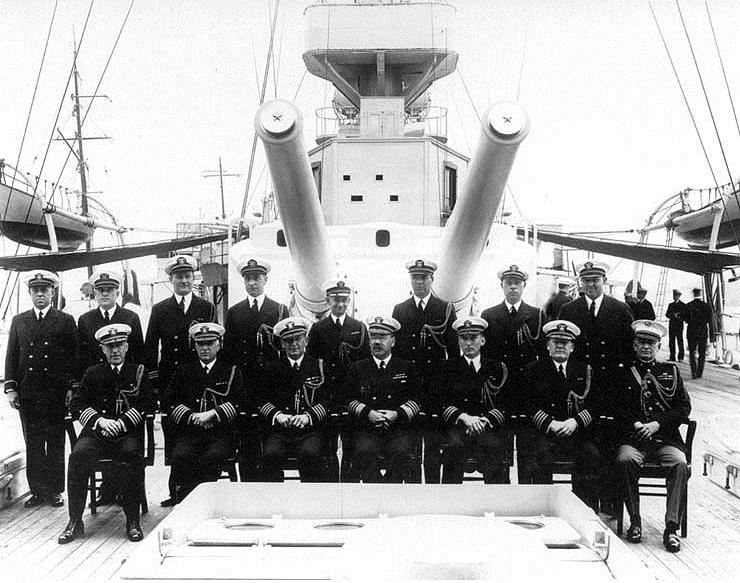
Admiral Taylor (front row, center) and the U.S. Asiatic Fleet staff aboard USS Rochester in Shanghai, China, in 1932.

Taylor was promoted to admiral and appointed Commander-in-Chief of the Asiatic Fleet (CICAF) on April 2, 1931. His command became effective September 1, 1931. He won the position based on a reputation for quick thinking and making decisions without waiting for approval by superiors. His chief of staff was Captain Frank Jack Fletcher (a future admiral who would successfully lead fleets in the Battle of the Coral Sea and Battle of Midway). Admiral Taylor believed that the role of the United States Navy in the Far East was "sitting tight" and not getting involved. He openly counseled American non-intervention in the Japanese invasion of Manchuria (which began on September 19, 1931) and believed that Japan could not be convinced to give up her war-won possessions on the mainland without coercion. Nonetheless, he acted decisively to ensure that the United States was positioned to intervene if necessary. The Asiatic Fleet was based in Manila in the Philippines. After the Mukden Incident, Taylor dispatched four fast destroyers to Shanghai without orders. He then ordered (again without approval from superiors) a troop of U.S. Marines to board his remaining ships so that the Asiatic Fleet had a ground force to use as well. As he prepared to sail, only then did U.S. Fleet Admiral William V. Pratt order him to proceed to Shanghai.

Taylor's tenure as commander-in-chief of the Asiatic Fleet was a tumultuous one. On February 24, 1932, Taylor helped Italy and China avoid an international incident. An artillery shell from the mainland hit the Italian Navy ship Libia, leading the Italians to threaten retaliation. Taylor convinced the Italians that, in the absence of any intentional shelling, they should consider the matter closed. His advice was taken, and Admiral Pratt publicly praised him for his quick thinking. On March 5, 1932, Taylor joined a joint British, French, and Italian committee sponsored by the League of Nations to investigate the war between China and Japan. The Asiatic Fleet returned to Manila in late March 1932. In May 1933, Taylor ordered the Asiatic Fleet to make a goodwill tour of Japan. He was cordially received by Emperor Hirohito.

Admiral Taylor became nationally known for his tact and diplomacy in dealing with the Japanese. Nonetheless, he stepped down as CINCAF on August 18, 1933. His successor was Admiral Frank B. Upham.

== Retirement and death ==
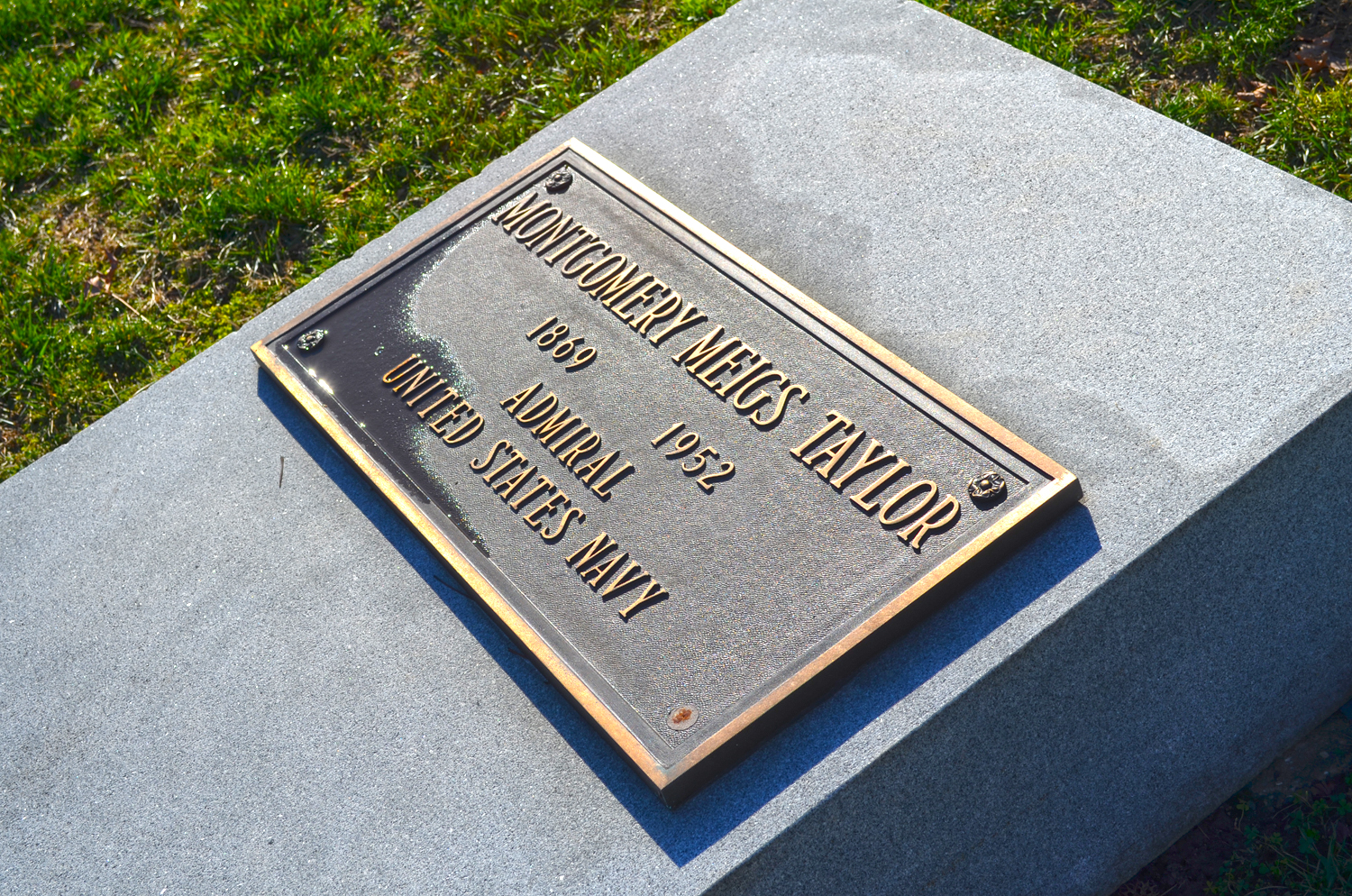
Grave of Montgomery M. Taylor in Arlington National Cemetery.

Montgomery M. Taylor retired from the U.S. Navy due to age restrictions on November 1, 1933.

Retirement did not end Taylor's public service, however. He was appointed to serve on the United States Maritime Commission on September 26, 1936, replacing Admiral Harry G. Hamlet. He remained on the commission until 1938, and then resigned. Thomas M. Woodward was appointed to fulfill the remainder of Taylor's term, which was due to end on September 26, 1939.

Taylor never married. After a lengthy illness, he died at Bethesda Naval Medical Center of a stroke on October 21, 1952. He was buried in Arlington National Cemetery.

== Awards and decorations ==
His awards and medals included the Dewey Medal, Spanish Campaign Medal, Philippine Campaign Medal, World War I Victory Medal, and the Navy Distinguished Service Medal.

He was a member of the Aztec Club of 1847 by right of his relationship to Major General Zachary Taylor.

== Bibliography ==
- "Acquisition Notes." Information Bulletin. Library of Congress. July 6, 1953.
- The American Year Book. New York: T. Nelson & Sons, 1938.
- Braisted, William Reynolds. Diplomats in Blue: U.S. Naval Officers in China, 1922–1933. Gainesville, Fla.: University Press of Florida, 2009.
- Coletta, Paolo Enrico. American Secretaries of the Navy. Annapolis, Md.: Naval Institute Press, 1980.
- Felker, Craig C. Testing American Sea Power: U.S. Navy Strategic Exercises, 1923–1940. College Station, Tex.: Texas A & M University Press, 2007.
- General Register of the Navy and Marine Corps of the United States. Washington, D.C.: Government Printing Office, January 1, 1920. Accessed 2013-01-20.
- Howarth, Stephen. To Shining Sea: A History of the United States Navy, 1775–1998. Norman, Okla.: University of Oklahoma Press, 1999.
- Jordan, Donald A. China's Trial By Fire: The Shanghai War of 1932. Ann Arbor, Mich.: University of Michigan Press, 2001.
- Kehn, Donald M. A Blue Sea of Blood: Deciphering the Mysterious Fate of the USS Edsall. Grand Rapids, Mich.: Publishers Group, 2008.
- Lundstrom, John B. Black Shoe Carrier Admiral: Frank Jack Fletcher at Coral Sea, Midway, and Guadalcanal. Annapolis, md.: Naval Institute Press, 2006.
- Love, Robert William. History of the U.S. Navy. Harrisburg, Penn.: Stackpole Books, 1992.
- Meigs, Benjamin. Record of the Descendants of Vincent Meigs. Baltimore, Md.: J.S. Bridges & Co., 1901.
- Miller, Edward S. War Plan Orange: The U.S. Strategy to Defeat Japan, 1897–1945. Annapolis, Md.: Naval Institute Press, 1991.
- Nicholson, Ruth S. Montgomery Meigs Taylor Papers: A Finding Aid to the Papers in the Naval Historical Foundation Collection in the Library of Congress. Manuscript Division, Library of Congress, Washington, D.C., 2011. Accessed 2013-01-20.
- Nofi, Albert A. To Train the Fleet for War: The U.S. Navy Fleet Problems, 1923–1940. Naval War College Historical Monograph Series, No. 18. Newport, R.I.: Naval War College, 2010.
- Register of the Commissioned and Warrant Officers of the United States Navy and of the Marine Corps to January 1, 1902. Washington, D.C.: Government Printing Office, 1902. Accessed 2013-01-20.
- Register of the Commissioned and Warrant Officers of the United States Navy and of the Marine Corps to January 1, 1922. Washington, D.C.: Government Printing Office, 1922. Accessed 2013-01-20.
- Reynolds, Clark G. On the Warpath in the Pacific: Admiral Jocko Clark and the Fast Carriers. Annapolis, Md.: Naval Institute Press, 2005.
- Stein, Harold. American Civil-Military Decisions: A Book of Case Studies. Birmingham, Ala.: University of Alabama Press, 1963.
- "Taylor, Montgomery Meigs." In The National Cyclopaedia of American Biography. James Terry White, Raymond D. McGill, and H.A. Harvey, eds. New York: J.T. White & Co., 1958.
- "Taylor, Montgomery Meigs." In Who Was Who in American History, the Military. Chicago: Marquis Who's Who, 1975.
- Tolley, Kemp. Yangtze Patrol: The U.S. Navy in China. Annapolis, Md.: Naval Institute Press, 1971.

Military offices
Preceded by Charles B. McVay, Jr.	Commander-in-Chief, United States Asiatic Fleet; September 1, 1931 – August 18, 1933	Succeeded by Frank B. Upham
