= Montgomery Township =

Montgomery Township may refer to:

== Arkansas ==
- Montgomery Township, Hot Spring County, Arkansas, in Hot Spring County, Arkansas

== Illinois ==
- Montgomery Township, Crawford County, Illinois
- Montgomery Township, Woodford County, Illinois

== Indiana ==
- Montgomery Township, Gibson County, Indiana
- Montgomery Township, Jennings County, Indiana
- Montgomery Township, Owen County, Indiana

== Minnesota ==
- Montgomery Township, Le Sueur County, Minnesota

== Missouri ==
- Montgomery Township, Hickory County, Missouri, in Hickory County, Missouri
- Montgomery Township, Montgomery County, Missouri
- Montgomery Township, Wright County, Missouri

== New Jersey ==
- Montgomery Township, New Jersey

== Ohio ==
- Montgomery Township, Ashland County, Ohio
- Montgomery Township, Franklin County, Ohio, now part of the city of Columbus
- Montgomery Township, Marion County, Ohio
- Montgomery Township, Wood County, Ohio

== Pennsylvania ==
- Montgomery Township, Franklin County, Pennsylvania
- Montgomery Township, Indiana County, Pennsylvania
- Montgomery Township, Montgomery County, Pennsylvania
