= Montgomery Academy, Bispham =

Coordinates: 53.85554°N 3.03796°W

Montgomery Academy
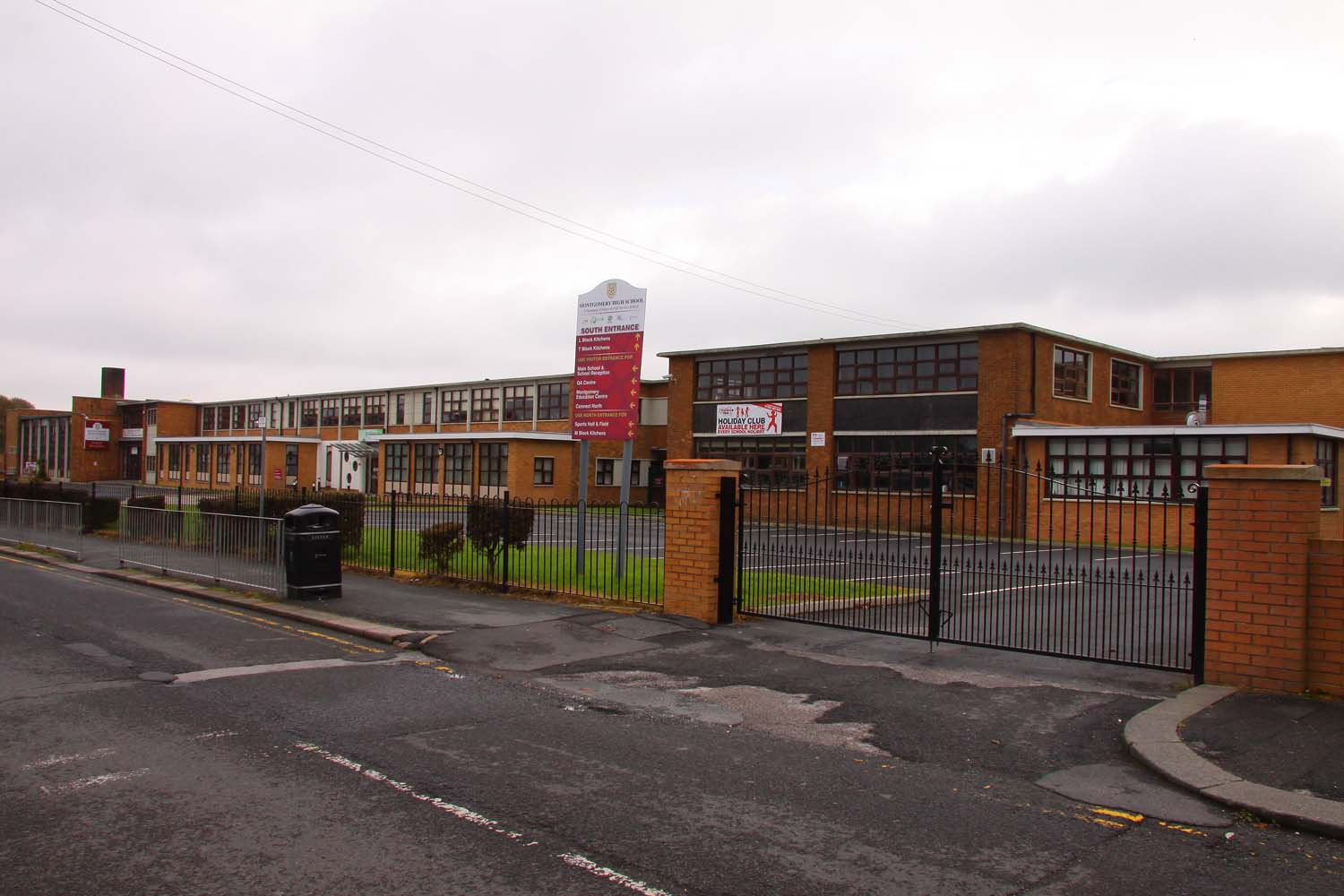
- School buildings (2011)

Location
- All Hallows Road; Blackpool, Lancashire, FY2 0AZ; England

Information
- Type: Academy
- Established: 1959
- Founder: Field Marshal Montgomery
- Department for Education URN: 137973 Tables
- Ofsted: Reports
- Principal: Stephen Careless
- Gender: Co-educational
- Age: 11 to 16
- Enrolment: 1,400
- Colours: Maroon and gunpowder black
- Website: http://www.montgomeryschool.co.uk/

Montgomery Academy (formerly Montgomery High School) is a co-educational secondary school located in Bispham (near Blackpool) in the English county of Lancashire.

== History ==
The school has previously held Specialist Language College status and was part of the Beacon schools programme.

In February 2001, the Times Educational Supplement listed Montgomery in a group of schools that had received outstanding inspection reports or achieved sustained excellent GCSE results.

In September 2005 it was notable for being awarded 'outstanding' assessments by Ofsted in the following key areas:

- How well does the school work in partnership with others to promote learners' well-being?
- How good is the overall personal development and well-being of the learners?
- How well do the curriculum and other activities meet the range of needs and interests of learners?
- How well are learners cared for, guided and supported?

Joan Humble and Stephen Twigg congratulated the school for its achievements in the House of Commons on 20 January 2005 and the school was then visited by the Secretary of State for Education Ruth Kelly.

Previously a foundation school administered by Blackpool Council, in April 2012 Montgomery High School converted to academy status. The school is now sponsored by the Fylde Coast Academy Trust, and was later renamed Montgomery Academy.

In 2014, Montgomery was placed in special measures. Ofsted rated it inadequate in all four areas of effectiveness: achievement of pupils, quality of teaching, behaviour and safety of pupils and leadership and management.

== Notable alumni ==
- Gary Burgess, broadcaster
- Paul Burgess, groundskeeper
- Vic McGlynn, DJ
- Hayley Tamaddon, actress
- Roger Uttley, rugby player
