= Atwater =

Atwater may refer to:

== Places ==
- Atwater, California, a city in Merced County, California
- Atwater Village, Los Angeles, a neighborhood of the city of Los Angeles in Los Angeles County, California
- Atwater, Georgia
- Atwater, Illinois
- Atwater, Minnesota
- Atwater Township, Portage County, Ohio
  - Atwater (CDP), Ohio, a census-designated place in the township
- Atwater, Saskatchewan, a village in Saskatchewan, Canada
- Atwater, Wisconsin

== People with the surname ==
- Amy Atwater, American paleontologist
- Ann Atwater (1935–2016), American civil rights activist
- Barry Atwater (1918–1978), American actor
- Caleb Atwater (1778–1867), American politician, historian, and early archaeologist
- Dorence Atwater (1845–1910), American civil war soldier known for keeping the "Atwater List" of Union fatalities
- Edwin Atwater (1808–1874), municipal alderman in Montreal for the district of Saint-Antoine
- Harry Atwater (born 1960), professor of physics at California Institute of Technology
- Helen W. Atwater (1876–1947), American author, home economist and editor
- Isaac Atwater (1818–1906), American jurist
- James E. Atwater (born 1946), American/Canadian multidisciplinary physical scientist and Wright Brothers medalist
- Jeff Atwater (born 1958), American politician
- Jeremiah Atwater (1773–1858), American educator, minister, and President of Middlebury College
- John Atwater (died 1499), Irish politician
- Lee Atwater (1951–1991), American Republican political strategist
- Mary Meigs Atwater (1878-1956), American handweaver, author, founder of the Shuttle-craft Guild
- Montgomery Atwater (1904-1976), Author, avalanche control expert, Skiing Hall of Fame inductee
- Reuben Atwater (1768–1831), American politician
- Richard M. Atwater (1844–1922), American chemist
- Richard and Florence Atwater (1892–1948; 1899–1979), authors of the children's book Mr. Popper's Penguins
- Steve Atwater (born 1966), former Denver Broncos and New York Jets Free Safety
- Tanya Atwater (born 1942), professor of geological sciences at the University of California, Santa Barbara who specializes in plate tectonics
- Tony Atwater, president of Indiana University of Pennsylvania
- Wilbur Olin Atwater (1844–1907), American developer of the respiration calorimeter
- William Atwater (curator) (born 1945), Director of the U.S. Army Ordnance Museum in Maryland

== Other ==
- Atwater (Montreal Metro), a station on the Green Line of the Montreal Metro
- Atwater Avenue, a street in Montreal
- Atwater Library of the Mechanics' Institute of Montreal, an independent library in Montreal operated by the Mechanics' Institute of Montreal
- Atwater Market, a public market in Montreal
- Atwater v. City of Lago Vista, a United States Supreme Court case
- United States Penitentiary, Atwater, a prison near Atwater, California
- The Atwater system for calculating the energy content of food (named after Wilbur Olin Atwater)

== See also ==
- Attwater, a surname
