= James E. Atwater =

American scientist

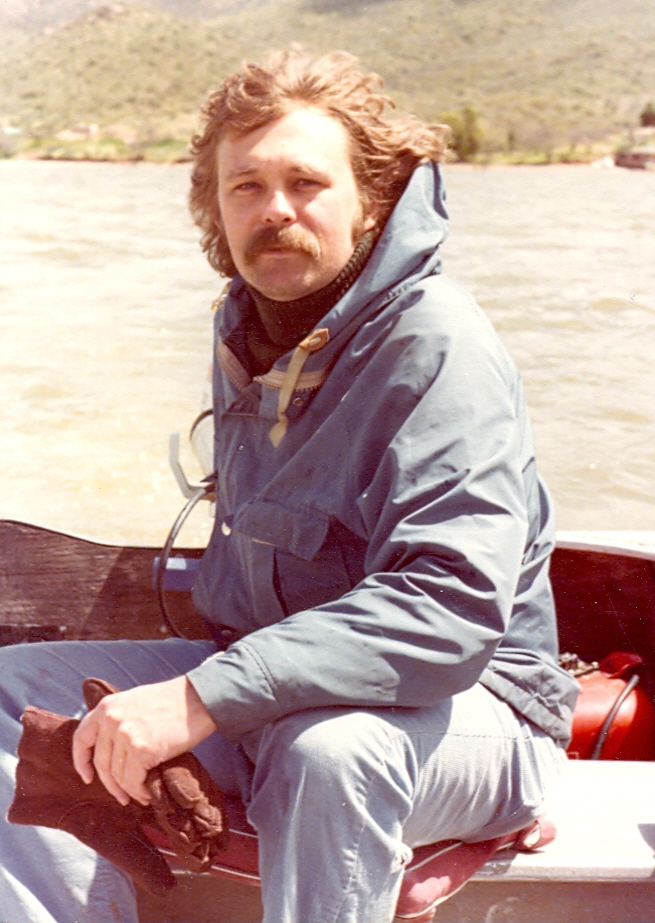
- Born: September 22, 1946 (age 79)

James E. Atwater (born September 22, 1946) is a retired North American multidisciplinary physical scientist with training in geophysics, chemistry, and biological science. Atwater holds courtesy faculty appointments with the University of Oregon Department of Chemistry and Biochemistry, and the School of Chemical, Biological and Environmental Engineering at Oregon State University On ResearchGate he has accumulated a score for Research Interest of 396.4 with a total of 8,689 reads and 811 citations of his peer-reviewed publications, as of April 23, 2026. He was awarded the Wright Brothers Medal for his work on microwave-powered methods for microbial stabilization and water recovery from solid waste. Atwater served in the United States Marine Corps (1963–1967) prior to attending the University of Utah (1968–1975) and University at Albany (1975).

== Early life and career ==
In his early career (1977–1980), Atwater concentrated on methods and instrumentation for identification and quantification of radionuclides associated with uranium exploration and recovery by gamma ray and alpha particle energy spectrometry. Subsequently, (1980–1987) he applied radiometric geophysical well logging techniques to the characterization of sandstone, limestone, dolomite and shale core samples. At this time he also refined methods for the determination of porosity and permeability of unconsolidated bitumen and heavy oil bearing sands. Later Atwater's attention turned to problems of long-term human presence in space, working on regenerable systems for water and air purification, and means for decomposition and stabilization of solid waste materials and recovery of useful resources therefrom.

During these years Atwater and colleagues also developed novel sensors and analytical instrumentation for monitoring and control of life support systems. In addition to instrumentation and methods, much of this work entailed the development of novel materials and the characterization of material properties, particularly with respect to magnetic and broadband microwave dielectric phenomena. Other research includes the study of multiphase immiscible fluid flow in porous media, and the recovery of hydrogen from methane (natural gas) using magnetically stabilized fluidized bed and microwave plasma reactors. Though in retirement, Atwater continues his association with former colleagues, providing theoretical analysis of experimental data and preparation of materials for publication.

== Family ==
Atwater is the son of the noted avalanche control pioneer and author Montgomery Atwater; the grandson of Maxwell Atwater, the first mining engineer to employ flotation hydrometallurgy in North America; and the grandson of Mary Meigs Atwater, the "Dean of American Hand Weaving". Other notable family members include his great-aunt Cornelia Meigs, a noted teacher historian and novelist; his great-grandfather Montgomery C. Meigs Jr., an accomplished civil engineer; and his great-great-grandfather Brigadier General Montgomery C. Meigs, a military and civil engineer, Quartermaster General of the Army during the American Civil War, and one of those present at the death bed of President Abraham Lincoln
