= Montgomery C. Meigs Jr. =

- Born: February 27, 1847; Detroit, Michigan, U.S.
- Died: December 9, 1931 (aged 84)
- Education: Harvard University
- Children: 6, including Mary, Grace and Cornelia
- Father: Montgomery C. Meigs
- Relatives: John Rodgers Meigs (brother)

Montgomery Cunningham "Monty" Meigs Jr. (February 27, 1847 – December 9, 1931) was an American civil engineer.

== Background ==
The son of U.S. Army General Montgomery C. Meigs, he was born in Detroit, Michigan, and educated at Harvard University and in Germany. He worked for a few years for the Northern Pacific Railroad, before taking the post of a civil engineer in Keokuk, Iowa, in 1882.

== Civil career ==
The junior Meigs is best known for his management of the canal and locks at the Des Moines Rapids, as well his involvement in the construction of the dam at the same which inundated the canal.

Although Meigs had not served in the military, he was often referred to as "Major" out of courtesy, because his predecessor at the Des Moines Rapids had been an army officer. Meigs' design for traffic control at the canal and locks prompted Captain F.A. Whitney to tell the Saturday Evening Post in 1924 that he could not recall a single incident having occurred by any vessel passing through the locks, so long as the rules had been obeyed, and that Meigs did not hesitate to become involved personally if needs be.

== Other interests and skills ==
Meigs was an accomplished riverboat pilot. One of his six daughters, author Cornelia Meigs, wrote in the Keokuk Daily Gate newspaper, dated July 30, 1966:

"...It is an unrecorded part of my father’s work that he had the whole picture of the river channel so fully in his mind, with his almost day to day information as to what the mighty Mississippi was about that he felt himself able, where other men would be in doubt, to take the wheel of the big passenger and cargo boats, carrying several hundred people, and pilot them himself down through some treacherous reach of the channel, often rising from his bed at night to do so. He was accepted as a welcome aide by the regular pilots who must know the long stretches of the river but could sometimes not be quite sure in the particularly difficult and rapidly changing channel."

Besides fulfilling this position for the government, Meigs was an inventor. He invented a "canvas coffer-dam," and pioneered the application of crude oil to dirt roads to improve driving conditions by controlling dust and mud.

He also built and designed steamboats and steam dredge tenders. From 1910 to 1913 he was the local inspecting engineer in the construction of the great lock, dry dock, and power developments on the Mississippi at Keokuk.

== Personal life ==
Meigs and his wife Grace Lynde had six daughters:

- Mary Meigs Atwater
- Louisa Meigs Green
- Grace Meigs Crowder, the physician
- Alice Meigs Orr
- Cornelia Lynde Meigs, writer
- Emily Meigs Fales.
