= Clearing Weather =

1928 book by Cornelia Meigs

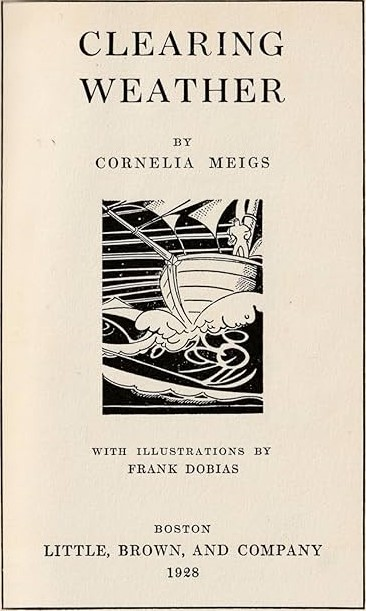
- Cover page
- Author: Cornelia Meigs
- Illustrator: Frank Dobias
- Language: English
- Genre: Children's literature / Historical fiction
- Publisher: Little, Brown, and Company
- Publication date: January 1, 1928
- Publication place: United States

Clearing Weather is a 1928 children's historical fiction novel written by Cornelia Meigs and illustrated by Frank Dobias. Opening in a coastal Massachusetts town shortly after the American Revolution, it follows the circumstances of the building of a great sailing ship, the Jocasta, and its first voyage to the Caribbean. The novel was a Newbery Honor recipient in 1929.
