= Mary E. Black =

American-Canadian artist

- Born: Mary Ellouise Black; September 18, 1895; Nantucket Island, Massachusetts
- Died: February 11, 1988 (aged 92); Wolfville, Nova Scotia
- Occupations: weaver, author, occupational therapist
- Employer(s): Nova Scotia Department of Industry and Publicity (later Trade and Industry)
- Known for: master weaver who promoted textile crafts in Nova Scotia
- Website: https://archives.novascotia.ca/black

Mary Ellouise Black (September 18, 1895 – February 11, 1988), an occupational therapist, teacher, master weaver and writer, created almost single-handedly a renaissance in crafts in Nova Scotia in the 1940s and 1950s. Her best-known book, The Key to Weaving, was published in 1945 and has since run to three editions and numerous printings. Its clarity is without parallel, and more than half a century later it remains a handweaver's prime source of information.

== Early life ==
Mary Ellouise Black was born on 18 September 1895 at Nantucket Island, Massachusetts. The eldest daughter of William M. and Ellouise (Eldridge) Black, she received her early education in the schools of Wolfville, Nova Scotia, and graduated from Acadia Ladies Seminary in 1913. From 1914 to 1919 she was employed first by the Town of Wolfville and later by the Royal Bank of Canada.

It could be said that Mary Black's career as a weaver started when she was aged eight in Wolfville, Nova Scotia, after she saw a picture of a Native loom. "Left on her own one day, she built a small loom. By evening, she had woven a grass doormat and the family wiped muddy boots on it for years."

== Occupational therapy ==
In June 1919, at age 23, she was trained as a ward occupation aide at McGill University in Montreal under a special program established by the federal government for disabled soldiers. Her first assignment upon her return was to the Nova Scotia Tuberculosis Sanatorium in Kentville. From there she was transferred to the Nova Scotia Hospital in Dartmouth in 1920, where she taught crafts to men returned from the trench warfare of World War I under the "Soldier's Civil Re-establishment" department, and subsequently organized an occupational therapy program there for civilians.

She once wrote that there was much more to be achieved through occupational therapy than had been realized, and perceiving no future for her own professional advancement in the province, she moved to the United States in 1922. In Boston she lectured on psychiatry and crafts at Massachusetts State Hospital for a year. Then in 1923, she moved to the Traverse City State Hospital in Michigan, where she organized and directed occupational therapy programs for the mentally ill and instructed student nurses in OT procedures. In 1932, she was transferred to Ypsilanti, Michigan, where a new hospital opened that was the first on the continent to use occupational (and recreational) therapy as a standard treatment for the mentally ill. Here she organized and directed OT and industrial therapy programs and instructed student nurses in OT from the University of Michigan, Ann Arbor.

From 1939 to 1943, she re-organized OT and set up new programs for patients in specialized environments at Milwaukee Sanitarium in Wauwatosa, Wisconsin. It was during this time that she began to gather material on weaving in order to assist a colleague who wanted to help a patient learn to weave. She also found time to join a number of occupational therapy groups and to produce several professional articles on occupational therapy and handcrafts.

== Nova Scotia arts and crafts ==
"By 1940 Black wanted to come home to Nova Scotia. Word of the movement to revive Nova Scotia's rural arts and crafts had reached her in Milwaukee, and she started to write letters to anyone in the province who might advance her interests." p. 165. In 1942, she was asked by the Province of Nova Scotia to return to the province to organize a provincial handcrafts program. "On August 18, 1942, Harold Connolly, the Minister of Industry and Publicity and a tourism zealot, wrote to Mary Black, an expatriate Nova Scotian and authority on handicrafts: "It is important that we get our arts and crafts set-up into operation immediately and for that reason it is imperative that we secure the services of a director at once." p. 164. In 1943, she became Supervisor of Handcrafts for the Department of Industry and Publicity (later Trade and Industry), a position she held until her retirement in 1954.

Under her guidance, craftspeople in rural communities were encouraged to develop and market their work, and classes in crafts were held all over the province to assist fledgling artists. She organized centres to teach and promote weaving, ceramics and needlework. As a result, a more tourism-oriented crafts industry emerged in the province. "Mary Black did not try to direct the efforts of craftspeople. Instead she acted as an enabler, helping producers to improve their work and to find markets for it". During her tenure in the Handcrafts Division, Black provided valuable sponsorship for the development of the Nova Scotia tartan by Bessie Murray in 1953.

She retired in 1954, but her 12 years' work in Nova Scotia had a lasting impact. Craftspeople found pride and profit in their work; cottage industries arose which continue to thrive and still provide finely crafted goods.

== Author ==
Realizing a need for instructional texts, Mary Black extended her teaching of weaving through writing. Her best known work, The Key to Weaving, began as a series of notes used for occupational therapy purposes. In 1941, she made contact with the Bruce Publishing Company of Milwaukee in an attempt to help her sister publish a book on doll's clothes. The publisher indicated that he really needed a weaving textbook. As a result, in 1943 she submitted the manuscript for The Key to Weaving, but it was not published until 1945 due to lack of paper during World War II.

The Key to Weaving has been reprinted 19 times. Mary did revisions to her masterpiece and in 1957 brought it out as The New Key to Weaving. This work became the bible of weavers internationally. During her lifetime it sold over 100,000 copies worldwide. A well-known weaver and author, Harriet Tidball, dedicated a copy of her own work Foundations for Handweavers to "Mary Black, a "Guiding Light" to all of us weavers".

When she was 85 years old, a still-vital Mary Black said in an interview that, when she wrote her book, she had to pretend to herself that she knew absolutely nothing about weaving, "yet I had to explain it so that anyone who was a beginner would understand what it was all about."

She is the author of a number of other publications and from 1944 to 1955 she was writer and editor of The Handcrafts Bulletin for the Nova Scotia government. From 1957 to 1960, she was co-owner and publisher of the bi-monthly Shuttlecraft Bulletins with Joyce Chown.

== Later life ==
During her lifetime, Mary belonged to a number of diverse organizations, including the Zonta Club of Halifax, the Nova Scotia branch of the Canadian Authors' Association, and the Canadian Crafts Council. She took a number of weaving courses, including one in Sweden and one at Penland, North Carolina, both of which were world-famous. She was also an accredited master weaver of the Boston Society of Fine Arts and of the Guild of Canadian Weavers.

Mary Black also helped to establish professional organizations: Guild of Canadian Weavers in 1947, the Nova Scotia Craftsmen's Guild and the Halifax Weavers' Guild. In 1971, the Atlantic Spinners and Handweavers (A.S.H.) appointed Mary their Honorary President for Life.

Her later life did not see a curtailment of her activities; in 1975 she was instrumental in establishing the Tideways Co-Operative Housing Complex for senior citizens in Wolfville, N.S. and sat on its board of directors for several years.

Mary E. Black died in Wolfville, Nova Scotia on February 11, 1988, at age 92.

== Her bequest ==
Her estate bequeathed to the Atlantic Spinners and Handweavers (A. S. H) a handmade chest containing, in orderly sequence, the collection of superbly woven textile samples along with research notes and correspondence relating to her published works, most notably The New Key to Weaving. To keep this unique collection secure and available for study, a permanent home was needed, so the Public Archives of Nova Scotia was approached. The Archives already had a significant collection of primary documents from Mary E. Black and her family as well as the manuscripts of her books. When the importance of the textiles to the entire Mary E. Black collection was perceived, the Archives made an exception to their normal acquisition policy and agreed to receive them as archival material in 1992.

== Conservation project ==
The collection of 1,350 textile items required careful conservation, which A.S.H. agreed to provide. Costume and textile specialists Clary and Sharon Croft of Halifax prepared a report listing all the items and their condition, and recommending a basic conservation plan and estimated budget. The estimated conservation cost of around $5,700 was well beyond the resources of a small volunteer society. A.S.H. gave $500 to defray the preliminary expenses, raised $1,700 through a raffle, and applied for and received $2,000 from the Jean A. Chalmers Fund of the Canada Council. Additional funds were solicited from the international weaving community. Ads in national and international weaving and textile publications and direct appeals to North American weaving societies brought immediate and gratifying results. Many weavers' and spinners' guilds from across the continent sent contributions both large and small; and many individuals who had been influenced by Mary Black's work sent personal donations.

Conservation work began in December 1993 with training sessions. Over the next year, under the careful supervision of the Crofts, A.S.H. volunteers and friends removed the destructive adhesives, staples and acid papers, and cleaned and labelled the textiles using current basic archival standards. The volunteer hours for conservation work alone amounted to a total of 658 hours. As part of the initial agreement, the Archives provided working space and additional support services, such as photocopying. The project was completed in February 1995.

== Virtual collection ==
For the 20th anniversary of her death in 2008, the Atlantic Spinners and Handweavers planned a celebration of her life and work. An exhibit of selected pieces from the collection was arranged in the Archives and ran from October 2007 to February 2008, and developed as a permanent website, the Mary E Black Virtual Collection.

== Bibliography ==
- Key to Weaving (1945)
- Weaving for Beginners (1953)
- Handweavers' Reference (1954)
- The Sett and Weaving of Tartans (1954)
- The Ready Reference Tables (1956 co-authored with Joyce Chown)
- New Key to Weaving (1957)
- Colour Guide for Handweavers (1958 co-authored with Joyce Chown)
- Thread Guide for Handweavers (1959 co-authored with Joyce Chown)
- You Can Weave (1974, co-authored with Bessie Murray)
- Key to Weaving, Second revised edition (1980)
