= John Heatwole =

American artist, historian and storyteller (1948-2006)

John L. Heatwole, III
- Born: March 24, 1948; Washington, DC
- Died: November 22, 2006; Rockingham Memorial Hospital, Harrisonburg, Virginia
- Resting place: Green Hill Cemetery, Churchville, Virginia
- Citizenship: United States
- Spouse: Miriam Dale Heatwole
- Parents: John L. Heatwole, Jr. (father); Lillye Marie Preston Heatwole (mother)

John L. Heatwole (1948–2006) was an artist, historian, tour guide, and storyteller who gathered and preserved hundreds of oral history and folklore stories from the Shenandoah Valley and throughout Virginia and West Virginia through writings, lectures, and radio programs.

Heatwole was born in Washington, DC and grew up in Northern Virginia, where he met his wife Miriam. After high school, he served in the U.S. Marine Corps. He worked at the Library of Congress.

Heatwole moved to the Shenandoah Valley at the persuasion of his uncle and began work at the Virginia Craftsmen Furniture Company in Harrisonburg, Virginia, in March 1974 as head woodcarver. He opened his own shop in Bridgewater, Virginia, in 1976.

Heatwole died of inoperable cancer on November 22, 2006.

== Artist ==
Heatwole began working in clay, but turned to woodcarving in his early 20s, seeking out two mentors who taught him to use woodcarving tools. Heatwole exhibited his art publicly for many years before finding a strategic success when his art was showcased in the Neiman Marcus department store's 1979 Christmas window in Washington, DC. He continued shows there until 1985. The Delaware Art Museum invited Heatwole to show his work in 1989, and in 1990 added a piece to its permanent collection. In 2004, the Harrisonburg-Rockingham Historical Society displayed more than 200 pieces at its museum in Dayton for a 30th anniversary celebration of the artist's career-change decision. In 1991 Heatwole became the first artist from Virginia to display art in the Capitol Rotunda. As of 2004, Heatwole estimated he had completed about 3,000 pieces of art.

== Historian and preservationist ==
Heatwole's interest in Civil War history began as a child. He salvaged bullets, buckles, pot pieces and other war-related artifacts from a field near his home.

Heatwole was the author of many books and booklets, including the Virginia and West Virginia Mountain and Valley Folk Life Series and The Burning: Sheridan in the Shenandoah Valley, which concerned the effects of Sheridan's fall 1864 campaign on civilians., Heatwole's Shenandoah Voices: Folklore, Legends, and Traditions of the Valley, published in 1995, featured recollections of people he interviewed who grew up in the 19th and 20th centuries.

Beginning in 1992, Heatwole hosted WSVA Radio's "Civil War on the Air" – a monthly, two hour call in radio program about the American Civil War. He also hosted a WSVA program on Valley folklore, and an additional show at a Lexington radio station. He served as adviser to the Frontier Culture Museum of Virginia in Staunton, Virginia, and has consulted with Time-Life Books.

Heatwole served on many committees and boards related to art and history throughout his life, including service as chair of the Rockingham County Bicentennial Committee. By 1998, Congress appointed Heatwole to the Shenandoah Valley Battlefields National Historic District Commission. Heatwole also served on the Shenandoah Valley Battlefields Foundation, created by the Commission. His preservation efforts included the site of the shooting of Union Lt. John Rodgers Meigs near Dayton, Virginia.

== Selected works ==
=== Articles ===
- Heatwole, John L. (October 31, 2003). "The Upland Witches". Daily News-Record. Harrisonburg, Virginia: Byrd Newspapers.
- Heatwole, John L. (December 23, 2004). "'Let The Belsnicklers In!'". Daily News-Record. Harrisonburg, Virginia: Byrd Newspapers.

=== Books ===
- Heatwole, John L. (1998). The Burning: Sheridan in the Shenandoah Valley. Charlottesville, VA: Rockbridge Pub. ISBN 9781883522186.
- Heatwole, John L. (1995). Shenandoah voices : folklore, legends, and traditions of the Valley. Berryville, VA: Rockbridge Pub. Co. ISBN 9781883522070.
- Heatwole, John L (2000). Chrisman's Boy Company : a history of the Civil War service of Company A, 3rd Battalion, Virginia Mounted Reserves. Bridgewater, Virginia: Mountain and Valley Pub. ISBN 9781893934085.
- Virginia and West Virginia Mountain and Valley Folk Life Series, 11 booklets

== Awards ==
- Jefferson Davis Historical Medal, Turner Ashby Chapter of the United Daughters of the Confederacy (2003). "for his life-long work to preserve history, including the publication of his latest book, "The Burning."
- Shenandoah University President's Award for Outstanding Service in Community History, Shenandoah University (2003)
- Carrington Williams Preservation Award, The Shenandoah Valley Battlefields Foundation (2006)
- Rockingham County Board of Supervisors Resolution (2006).
- Senate Joint Resolution No. 430: Celebrating the life of John L. Heatwole, U.S. Congress (2007)
