= Invincible Louisa =

1933 book by Cornelia Meigs

- Author: Cornelia Meigs
- Language: English
- Subject: Louisa May Alcott
- Genre: Biography
- Publisher: Little, Brown & Company/Hachette Book Groump
- Publication date: 1933
- Publication place: United States
- Media type: Hardback
- ISBN: 978-0-316-56594-3
- OCLC: 33669076

Invincible Louisa is a biography by Cornelia Meigs that won the Newbery Medal and the Lewis Carroll Shelf Award. It retells the life of Louisa May Alcott, author of Little Women.

== Plot ==
Invincible Louisa, subtitled "The Story of the Author of Little Women", opens with Louisa Alcott's birth on a snowy November day in Germantown, Pennsylvania. Her father, Bronson Alcott, ran a school for young children in their home. "It was a time of great happiness, peace, and security... Happiness was to continue... but peace and security were not to come again for a very long time". So Meigs introduces her reader to Alcott's life. Her father, Bronson, is portrayed as brilliant but impractical, unable to support his family as a man of the times was expected to.

The book follows the Alcott family to Boston and Concord, as Bronson Alcott seeks places that understand his unusual views on education and transcendentalism. Louisa proves to be an active child, getting into trouble and causing her mother, Abba, some anxiety. When she is ten the family moves again to Fruitlands, the transcendentalist community Alcott helps found. By now there are four girls in the family. Meigs portrays Bronson Alcott and the oldest daughter, Anna, as being fully committed to the ideals of this new life, but says that Louisa and her mother understand how much hard work would be necessary for a communal farm to succeed. The contrast between idealistic and practical is shown when Bronson and the only other adult leave the area for a conference just as the barley is being harvested. An approaching storm has Abba and the children bringing in the grain alone. In less than a year Fruitlands failed, and the family moved several more times.

Invincible Louisa follows the Alcotts' friendship with Ralph Waldo Emerson, and recounts some of the events Louisa later used in Little Women, including meetings of the Pickwick Club and the death of one of Louisa's younger sisters, Elizabeth. Louisa later leaves the family to earn her own way writing and teaching. During the Civil War she travels to Washington, DC to nurse soldiers. The book concludes with Louisa writing Little Women and the two books that followed, Little Men and Jo's Boys. The success of these books, according to Meigs, gives Louisa her own "happy ending... the whole of what she had wanted from life -- just to take care of them all."

Invincible Louisa ends with a five page chronology of Louisa May Alcott's life.

== Critical reception ==
Children's Literature calls Invincible Louisa a "graceful, well-written account"... Besides presenting the facts of her life, the author weaves in many evocative descriptions of Louisa's environment and feelings, thus creating a biography that seems more interesting and appealing than a more factual, unadorned work." Kirkus Reviews called Meigs "one of the best-loved authors of fiction for boys and girls." It went on to praise "the new biography, which makes Joe (sic) live again in the courageous, gallant girlhood of this favorite of American story tellers."

Invincible Louisa received the Newbery Medal for "the most distinguished contribution to American literature for children" in 1934. It was awarded the Lewis Carroll Shelf Award in 1963.

Awards
Preceded by Young Fu of the Upper Yangtze	Newbery Medal recipient 1934	Succeeded by Dobry
