= Harriet Tidball =

American weaver (1909–1969)

- Born: Harriet Colburn Tidball; 1909; Ohio
- Died: June 25, 1969 (aged 59–60); Lansing, Michigan
- Occupations: Weaver, author
- Known for: Handweaving, Director of Shuttle Craft Guild
- Parent(s): Rev. Harvey Cade and Mary Scott Colburn

Harriet Colburn Tidball (1909 – June 25, 1969) was an American weaver who served as the director of the Shuttle Craft Guild from 1946 to 1957, and from 1960 until her death in 1969. She was the editor of the monthly periodical, Shuttle Craft Bulletin. Tidball taught weaving at the Montana Division of Rehabilitation of the Blind. She was the author of The Weaver's Book, and has written many monographs published by the Shuttle Craft Guild. She died in 1969 after a cerebral hemorrhage.

== Life ==
Tidball was an influential figure in the field of handweaving and textiles, known for her contributions to the craft through her writings and educational efforts. She authored numerous books and monographs that served as successive impact to weavers and textile workers. She studied with Mary Meigs Atwater and upon Atwater's retirement in 1946 bought the Shuttle Craft Guild in Virginia City, Montana.

Her works include The Weaver's Book: Fundamentals of Handweaving, which is considered a seminal text in the field, providing comprehensive coverage of handweaving techniques and principles. Tidball's expertise also extended to specific weaving methods, as seen in her books Doubleweave Plain and Patterned and Weaving Inkle Bands.

Her book The Handloom Weaves is an analysis and classification of the most important harness-controlled weaves for the handloom, complete with illustrations and explanations.

Throughout her career, Tidball was dedicated to exploring and documenting the rich diversity of textile traditions from around the world. Her monograph Peru: Textiles Unlimited reportedly showcases the vast array of Peruvian textiles, reflecting her interest in cultural textile practices.

== Selected work ==
Shuttle Craft Guild Monograph

- Surface Interest: Textiles of Today
- Contemporary Tapestry
- Color and Dyeing
- Contemporary Costume

Others

- Thomas Jackson, Weaver (A historical account of the 17th and 18th-century weaver Thomas Jackson)
- Mexican Motifs
- Contemporary Satins
- The Handweaver's Project Book

== See also ==
- Mary Meigs Atwater
