= The Windy Hill =

Children's book by Cornelia Meigs

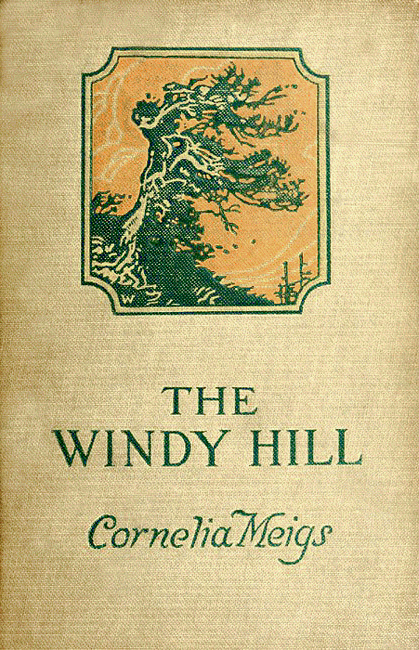
- Author: Cornelia Meigs
- Illustrator: Berta and Elmer Hader
- Language: English
- Genre: Children's literature
- Publisher: Macmillan
- Publication date: 1921
- Publication place: United States
- Pages: 210

The Windy Hill is a 1921 children's novel written by Cornelia Meigs and illustrated by Berta and Elmer Hader. A brother and sister learn about their own family's history in New England through a series of tales told by an elderly beekeeper. The novel was one of the first five books awarded with a Newbery Honor in 1922.
