= Attwater =

Attwater is a surname. Notable people with the surname include:

- Henry Philemon Attwater (1854–1931), British-Canadian-American naturalist and conservationist
- Sam Attwater (born 1986), English actor and singer

== See also ==
- Atwater (disambiguation)
