= Grace Meigs Crowder =

American physician (1881–1925)

- Born: August 30, 1881; Rock Island, Illinois, US
- Died: January 20, 1925 (aged 43)
- Known for: Studies of infant and maternal mortality
- Spouse: Thomas Reid Crowder
- Parents: Montgomery Meigs (father); Grace Lynde Meigs (mother)
- Relatives: Cornelia Meigs (sister)
- Scientific career
- Institutions: Cook County Hospital

Grace Lynde Meigs Crowder (August 30, 1881 – January 20, 1925) was an American physician who studied infant mortality and maternal mortality. She did early comparisons with the data from other countries, and she discovered that childbirth was the second most common cause of death in younger American women.

== Early life and education ==
Meigs was born in Rock Island, Illinois, on August 30, 1881. Her parents were Montgomery Meigs, a civil engineer, and his wife Grace Lynde. Meigs had five sisters, one of whom, Cornelia Meigs, became a noted author.

Meigs was educated at Keokuk High School, before attending Bryn Mawr College, Pennsylvania, where she participated in collegiate athletics. She graduated from Bryn Mawr in 1903 with honors. From 1904 to 1905, Meigs attended Keokuk Medical College, followed from 1905 to 1908 by study at Rush Medical College, which at that time was affiliated with the University of Chicago. Meigs graduated from Rush first in her class. During her final two years at Rush, she spent considerable time at the Presbyterian Hospital. Meigs gained top marks in the competitive examination for interns at Cook County Hospital, Illinois. Her grade average was 87.91, ahead of the second placed student who had an average grade of 81.77. Meigs had been the only woman to sit the examination, and, after Anna Blount, was the second woman to attain top marks.

== Career ==
Now a medical doctor, Meigs travelled to Europe for post-graduate studies in Germany and Austria. After two years of study abroad, Meigs became attending physician at the Cook County Hospital.

In 1915, Meigs was recruited by Julia Lathrop, chief of the Children's Bureau of the U.S. Department of Labor, to become the first director of the Child Hygiene Division. There Meigs oversaw research on infant and maternal mortality. In 1917, she authored a study of childbirth-related maternal mortality, collating data from the United States as well as other countries. Her research found that women's deaths from pregnancy and childbirth-related issues had not decreased in the years between 1890 and 1913, a finding counter to the prevailing opinion of physicians at the time. This was the first study which compared infant mortality in the United States to that in other countries. The study found that, after tuberculosis, childbirth was the second-most common cause of death of women aged 15 to 45 years.

Meigs' 1917 report on maternal mortality was influential in the US, and led to the development of services for pregnant women and nursing mothers, the increased establishment of obstetric facilities, and the passing of the Sheppard–Towner Act. Meigs was a proponent of mothers remaining at home with their children; she wrote:

The chief preventative measure for protecting babies is to ensure their intelligent care and nursing by healthy mothers in their own homes.

During her career, Meigs served on the Commission on Infant Welfare, and was a member of the General Medical Board and the Council of National Defense.

Meigs continued as Director of the Division of Hygiene until July 15, 1918, a few months prior to her marriage on September 9, 1918, to Thomas Reid Crowder, a fellow physician, in Keokuk, Iowa. She was his second wife; they had three children, Alice Meigs, Juliet Reid and Thomas Reid Jr.

Meigs died on January 20, 1925, in Chicago.

== Works ==
- Meigs, Grace L.; Swain Routzahn, Mary (1915). Baby-week campaigns : suggestions for communities of various sizes (Report). Miscellaneous Series No. 5 | Bureau Publication No. 15. Washington: Government Printing Office. OCLC 6236547 – via HathiTrust.
- Meigs, Grace (1 July 1915). "Review of the literature on the feeding and gastrointestinal diseases of infants for the year 1914–1915". Archives of Pediatrics & Adolescent Medicine. X (1): 42. doi:10.1001/archpedi.1915.04110010045006.
- Meigs, Grace (1916). "Rural obstetrics". Transactions of the American Association for the Study and Prevention of Infant Mortality. 7: 46–61.
- Meigs, Grace L. (1917). Maternal Mortality from all conditions connected with childbirth in the United States and certain other countries (Report). Miscellaneous Series No. 6 | Bureau Publication No. 19. Washington: Government Printing Office – via HathiTrust.
- Meigs, Grace L. (August 1917). "Infant welfare work in war time". American Journal of Diseases of Children. 15. Chicago: American Medical Association: 80–97 – via HathiTrust.
- Meigs, Grace L. (27 July 1918). "The Children's Year Campaign". The Journal of the American Medical Association. 71 (4): 243. doi:10.1001/jama.1918.02600300007003.
