= Frank Dobias =

American illustrator

Franz August Rudolph de Santis Dobiáš (May 11, 1900 – January 10, 1976), known as Frank Dobias, was an Austrian-born American illustrator of children's books. Among many other works, his illustrations for the Japanese version of Little Black Sambo made the book a bestseller in Japan, selling well over a million copies between 1953 and 1988.

== Biography ==
Dobias was born in Gloggnitz, Austria-Hungary, the son of Franz Dobiáš Sr. from Bohemia and Anna Maria Katharina Fondi, of Italian noble descent. His father and uncle were landscape painters. His maternal grandfather and uncle, both named August Fondi, were architects. He grew up in Vienna, where he attended the Kunstgewerbeschule and Kunst Akademie in Vienna. Frank Dobias studied under Franz Cižek and Alfred Roller.

He emigrated to the United States in 1923 and settled in Pennsylvania, where he started his professional career as illustrator mostly for Macmillan Publishers books. The illustrations used in the Japanese best-seller were originally drawn for Little Black Sambo published from Macmillan in 1927.

The Macmillan 1927 version was revived from Komichi Shobo Publishing, a Japanese publisher in Tokyo, in 2008.

== Selected works ==
- Bannerman, Helen. Little Black Sambo. The Happy Hour Books. Macmillan Publishers, 1927.
- Siebe, Josephine. Kasperle’s Adventures. Translated by Florence Geiser. Macmillan Publishers, 1929.
- Morris, William. Sons of the Volsungs. Adapted by Dorothy Hosford from Sigurd the Volsung by William Morris. Macmillan Publishers, 1932.
- Junior Bible. Macmillan Publishers, 1936.
- Cook, Canfield. Sky Attack. New York: Grosset & Dunlap, 1942. OCLC 4865269
- Kelsey, Alice (Geer). Once the Hodja. Longman’s 1943.
- Bannerman, Helen. Chibikuro Sambo. Komichi Shobo Publishing, 2008. (A Japanese translation of Macmillan's 1927 version.)
