= Swift Rivers =

1932 children's novel by Cornelia Meigs

- Author: Cornelia Meigs
- Illustrator: Forrest W. Orr
- Language: English
- Genre: Children's literature
- Publisher: Little, Brown and Company
- Publication date: 1932
- Publication place: United States

Swift Rivers is a children's historical novel by Cornelia Meigs. Set in 1835 Minnesota, orphan Chris Dahbert lives with his drunk and abusive uncle on the Goose Wing River. After his uncle kicks him out, Chris lives with his grandfather, Alexis, a man of simple means. To supplement his grandfather's meagre income, Chris and his friend Eric decide to float logs down to the Mississippi River to sell in St. Louis. The novel was a Newbery Honor recipient in 1933.
