= Alice Geer Kelsey =

American writer

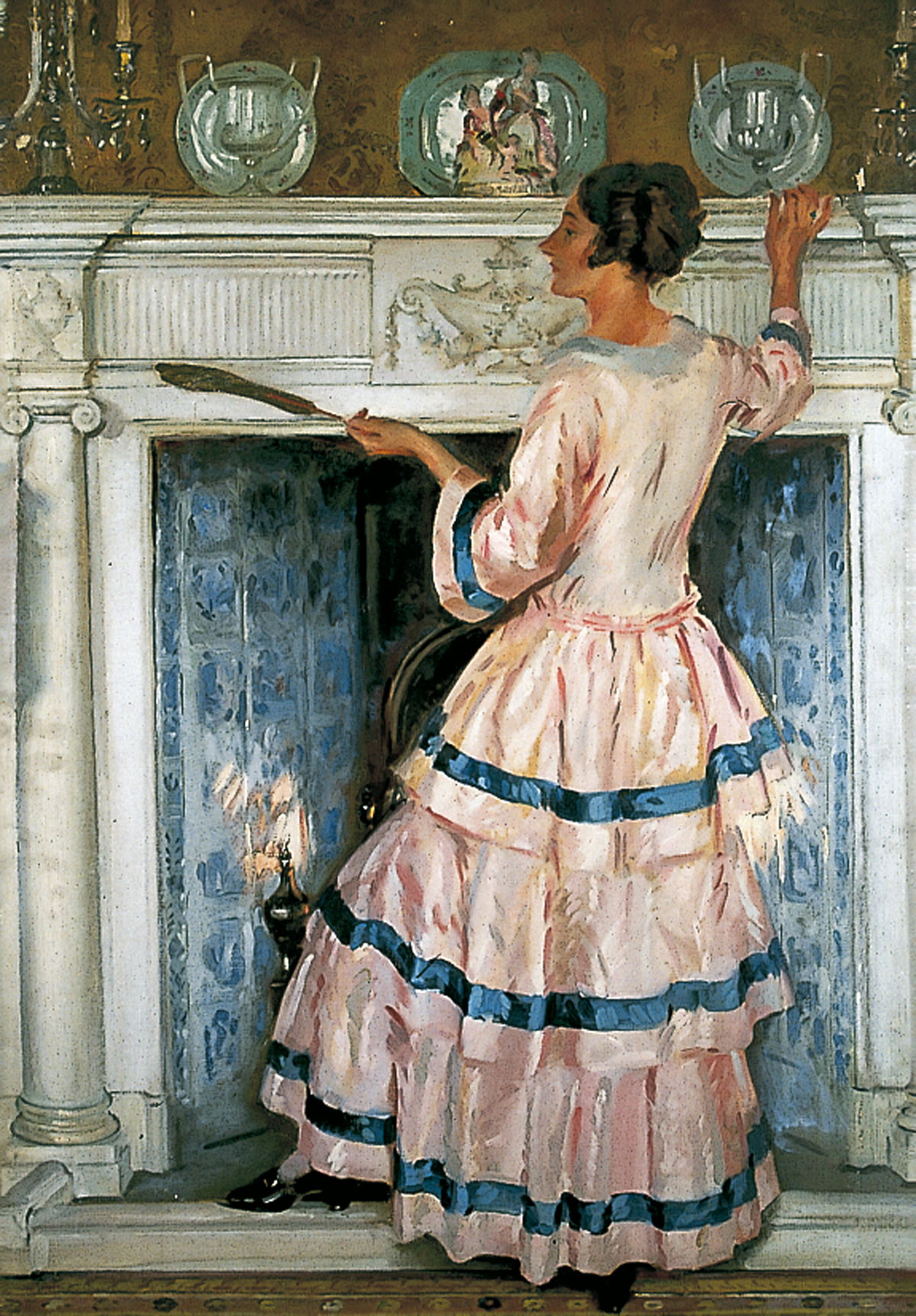
Mrs Kelsey in Pink, 1919, by William Bruce Ellis Ranken

Alice Geer Kelsey (September 21, 1896 – September 1982) was an American writer of children's books, many of which were based on folk tales she collected during her long public service career in Europe and the Near East.

== Life and career ==
Alice Geer was born in Danvers, Massachusetts, and grew up in Lewiston, Maine, and West Hartford, Connecticut. She received her B.A. in history from Mount Holyoke College in 1918. In 1919, she married Lincoln David Kelsey and immediately thereafter left on the second boat taking relief workers to the Near East after World War I. She worked with war orphans at Merzifoun, Turkey, and collected the stories retold Once the Hodja.

In 1928, Mr. Kelsey joined the faculty of Cornell University in Ithaca, New York, where the Kelseys made their home. <author's bio on I Give You My Colt, Longman's Green & Co. 1956.> When World War II called them again for relief work, Mrs. Kelsey served with UNRRA in Athens, while her husband's skill was again helpful in revitalizing the agricultural infrastructure across Europe. From her experiences in Athens, Mrs. Kelsey wrote the children's book Racing the Red Sail. A long sojourn studying social problems in Puerto Rico followed, and this gave Mrs. Kelsey the material for Ricardo's White Horse. She published a second collection of folk stories, Once the Mullah, following work in Iran in 1952–1953. I Give You My Colt followed, providing a portrait of youthful life in mid-century Iran.

Mrs. Kelsey is the sister of classicist Russel M. Geer, who, in 1955, famously resigned in protest as Tulane University's associate dean of arts and sciences over what he perceived as undue academic favoritism to two football players.
