= Montgomery C. Meigs =

Union Army general

Montgomery Cunningham Meigs
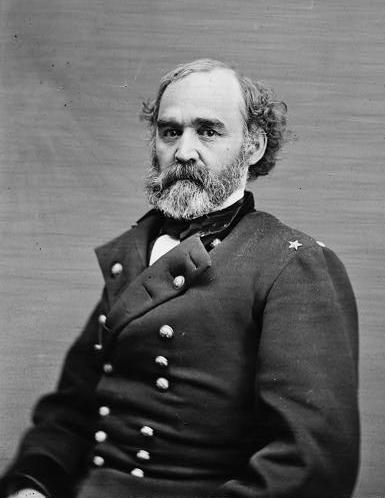
- Montgomery C. Meigs
- Born: May 3, 1816; Augusta, Georgia, U.S.
- Died: January 2, 1892 (aged 75); Washington, D.C., U.S.
- Burial place: Arlington National Cemetery (Arlington County, Virginia, U.S.)
- Relatives: John Rodgers Meigs (son) "Monty" Meigs (son); John Rodgers (brother in law)
- Military career
- Allegiance: United States; Union
- Branch: United States Army; Union Army
- Service years: 1836–1882
- Rank: Brigadier General; Brevet Major General
- Commands: Quartermaster General
- Conflicts: American Civil War
- Other work: Smithsonian Institution regent National Academy of Sciences, member, builder of Arlington National Cemetery

Montgomery Cunningham Meigs (/ˈmɛɡz/; May 3, 1816 – January 2, 1892) was a career United States Army officer and military and civil engineer, who served as Quartermaster General of the U.S. Army during and after the American Civil War. Although a Southerner from Georgia, Meigs strongly opposed secession and supported the Union. His record as Quartermaster General was regarded as outstanding, both in effectiveness and in ethical probity, and Secretary of State William H. Seward viewed Meigs' leadership and contributions as key factors in the Union victory in the war.

Meigs was one of the principal architects of Arlington National Cemetery. Meigs's decision to locate the cemetery on Robert E. Lee's family estate, Arlington House, was partly a gesture to humiliate Lee for siding with the Confederacy.

== Early life and education ==
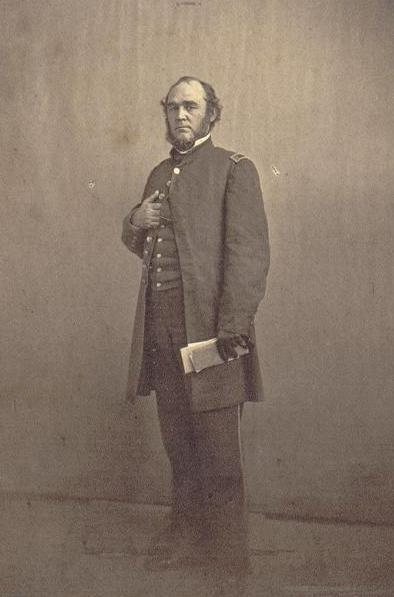
Meigs in March 1861, roughly a month before the outbreak of the American Civil War

Meigs was born in Augusta, Georgia, in May 1816. He was the son of Dr. Charles Delucena Meigs and Mary Montgomery Meigs. His father was a nationally known obstetrician and professor of obstetrics at Jefferson Medical College in Philadelphia. His grandfather, Josiah Meigs, graduated from Yale University, where he was a classmate of future dictionary creator Noah Webster and American Revolutionary War general and politician Oliver Wolcott, and later was president of the University of Georgia. Montgomery Meigs' mother, Mary, was the granddaughter of a Scottish family from Brigend with somewhat distant claims to a baronetcy, which emigrated to America in 1701.

Meigs' father apprenticed as a physician in Philadelphia until 1812, at which time he moved to Athens, Georgia. He enrolled at the University of Pennsylvania in Philadelphia three years later, in 1815, the same year he began to practice medicine in Georgia. Charles Meigs received his medical degree from the University of Pennsylvania School of Medicine in 1817, and that summer he moved his family, which then included a one-year-old Montgomery, to Philadelphia and established a practice there. The Meigs family was wealthy and well-connected, and Charles Meigs was a strong supporter of the Democratic Party. Meigs had an extremely good memory, and his father instilled in him a sense of duty and a desire to pursue honorable causes. Young Montgomery received schooling at the Franklin Institute and then a preparatory school for the University of Pennsylvania. Meigs learned French, German, and Latin, and studied art, literature, and poetry. He enrolled at the University of Pennsylvania when he was only 15 years old. A hard worker, he was one of the top students at the university.

The Meigs family had extensive ties to the military and to the United States Military Academy in West Point, New York. Montgomery Meigs wished to serve in the United States Army. West Point was the only well established engineering school in the United States at the time. Through family connections, Meigs won an appointment to West Point, entering in 1832. He excelled academically at West Point, although he said he spent too much time with athletics and outdoor activities. He was among the top three students in French and mathematics, and did well in history. He graduated fifth out of a class of 49 in 1836, and he had more good conduct merits that ranked in the top third his class.

He received a commission as a second lieutenant in the 1st U.S. Artillery, but most of his army service was with the Corps of Engineers, in which he worked on important engineering projects.

In his early assignments, Meigs helped build Fort Mifflin and Fort Delaware, both on the Delaware River, and Fort Wayne on the Detroit River. He also served under the command of then-Lt. Robert E. Lee to make navigational improvements on the Mississippi River. Beginning in 1844, Meigs also was involved with the construction of Fort Montgomery on Lake Champlain in upstate New York.

Within a few days of each other, in late March 1853, Meigs became responsible for supervising both the building of the Washington Aqueduct and the enlargement of the United States Capitol. His favorite pre-Civil War engineering project was the Washington Aqueduct, which he supervised from 1852 to 1860. It involved constructing the monumental Union Arch Bridge across Cabin John Creek, designed by Alfred L. Rives, which for 50 years remained the longest single-span masonry arch in the world. From 1853 to 1859, he also supervised the building of the wings and dome of the United States Capitol and, from 1855 to 1859, the extension of the General Post Office Building.

In the fall of 1860, as a result of a disagreement over procurement contracts, Meigs incurred the ill will of the Secretary of War, John B. Floyd, and was banished to Tortugas in the Gulf of Mexico to construct fortifications there and at Key West, including Fort Jefferson, Florida. Upon the resignation of Floyd a few months later, Meigs was recalled to his work on the aqueduct at Washington.

== Civil War ==
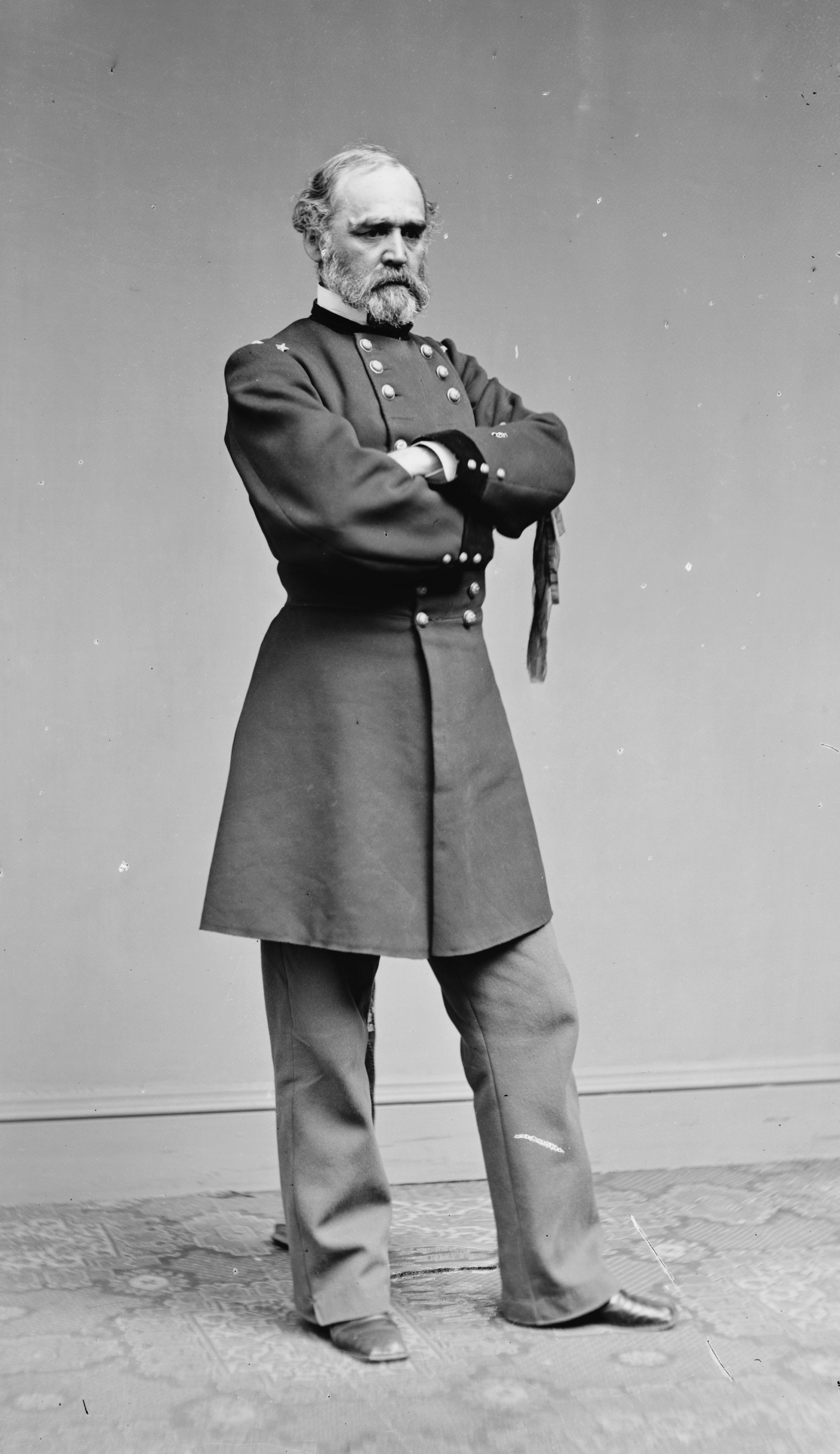
Montgomery C. Meigs

Just before the outbreak of the Civil War, Meigs and Lt. Col. Erasmus D. Keyes were quietly charged by President Abraham Lincoln and Secretary of State William H. Seward with drawing up a plan for the relief of Fort Pickens in Florida, by means of a secret expedition. In April 1861, together with Lieutenant David D. Porter of the Navy, they carried out the expedition, embarking under orders from the President without the knowledge of either the Secretary of the Navy or the Secretary of War.

On May 14, 1861, Meigs was appointed colonel, 11th U.S. Infantry, and on the following day, promoted to brigadier general and Quartermaster General of the Army. The previous Quartermaster General, Joseph Johnston, had resigned and become a general in the Confederate Army. Meigs established a reputation for being efficient, hard-driving, and honest. He molded a large and somewhat diffuse department into an effective tool of war. He was one of the first to fully appreciate the importance of logistical preparations in military planning, and under his leadership, supplies moved forward and troops were transported over long distances with ever-greater efficiency.

James G. Blaine, commenting on Meigs' work in the quartermaster's office, said:

Montgomery C. Meigs, one of the ablest graduates of the Military Academy, was kept from the command of troops by the inestimably important services he performed as Quartermaster General. Perhaps in the military history of the world there never was so large an amount of money disbursed upon the order of a single man ... The aggregate sum could not have been less during the war than fifteen hundred million dollars, accurately vouched and accounted for to the last cent.

U.S. Secretary of State William H. Seward estimated that "without the services of this eminent soldier the national cause must have been lost or deeply imperiled."

While Meigs served as Quartermaster General throughout the war he went on an extensive inspection tour from August 1863 to January 1864. During that time Colonel Charles Thomas acted in his stead back in Washington, D.C. Meigs' field services during the Civil War included command of Lieutenant General Ulysses S. Grant's base of supplies at Fredericksburg and Belle Plain, Virginia (1864); command of a division of War Department employees in the defense of Washington at the time of Jubal A. Early's raid (July 11 to 14, 1864); personally supervising the refitting and supplying of Major General William T. Sherman's army at Savannah (January 5 to 29, 1865), Goldsboro, and Raleigh, North Carolina and reopening Sherman's lines of supply (March to April 1865). He was brevetted to major general on July 5, 1864.

A staunch Unionist, Meigs detested the Confederacy. His feelings led directly to the establishment of Arlington National Cemetery. On July 16, 1862, Congress passed legislation authorizing the U.S. federal government to purchase land for national cemeteries for military dead, and put the U.S. Army Quartermaster General in charge of this program. The Soldiers' Home in Washington, D.C., and the Alexandria Cemetery were the primary burying grounds for war dead in the D.C. area, but by late 1863 both cemeteries were full. In May 1864, Union forces suffered large numbers of dead in the Battle of the Wilderness. Meigs ordered that an examination of eligible sites be made for the establishment for a large new national military cemetery. Within weeks, his staff reported that Arlington Estate was the most suitable property in the area. The property was high and free from floods (which might unearth graves), it had a view of the District of Columbia, and it was aesthetically pleasing. It was also the home of Robert E. Lee, future General-in-Chief of the Confederacy, whom Meigs considered a traitor, and denying Lee use of his home after the war was a valuable political consideration. Although the first military burial at Arlington had been made on May 13, Meigs did not authorize establishment of burials until June 15, 1864. Meigs ordered that the estate be surveyed and that 200 acres (81 ha) be set aside for use as a cemetery.

=== The logistics system ===
There was a notable disparity between the Union and Confederate logistical situations. The Confederacy had a longstanding supply deficit, which only intensified as the war dragged on. Union forces, on the other hand, usually had enough food, ammunition, weapons, and other supplies. The Union logistics system, even as it penetrated deeper into the South, maintained its efficiency. Historians credit these achievements to Meigs. Union quartermasters were responsible for most of the $3 billion spent for the war. They operated out of sixteen major depots, which formed the basis of the system of procurement and supply throughout the war. As the war expanded, operation of these depots became much more complex, with an overlapping and interweaving relationship between the army and government operated factories, private factories, and numerous middlemen. The purchase of goods and services through contracts supervised by the quartermasters accounted for most of federal military expenditures, apart from the wages of the soldiers. The quartermasters supervised their own soldiers, and cooperated closely with state officials, manufacturers and wholesalers trying to sell directly to the army; and representatives of civilian workers looking for higher pay at government factories. The complex system was closely monitored by congressmen anxious to ensure that their districts won their share of contracts. The system grew in efficiency to the point Union troops on long marches would simply throw away excess knapsacks, bedrolls, overcoats, and other pieces of clothing and equipment that they felt were weighing them down, fully confident that they would be resupplied at some point in the near future.

=== Wartime deaths ===
In October 1864, his son, 1st Lieutenant John Rodgers Meigs, was killed at Swift Run Gap in Virginia and was buried at a Georgetown Cemetery. Lt. Meigs was part of a three-man patrol which ran into a three-man Confederate patrol. Lt. Meigs was killed, one man was captured, and one man escaped. To the end of his life, Meigs believed that his son had been murdered after being captured—despite evidence to the contrary. The younger Meigs was laid to rest in Oak Hill Cemetery in Georgetown in Washington, D.C. Both Abraham Lincoln and Secretary of War Edwin M. Stanton attended the interment. He was later re-interred at Arlington National Cemetery.

Meigs was also present for Lincoln's death. At 10:00 pm on the evening of April 14, 1865, Meigs heard that William Seward had been attacked by a knife-wielding assailant. Meigs rushed to Rodgers House, Seward's home on Lafayette Square just across the street from the White House. Shortly after arriving at Seward's home, Meigs learned of the shooting of Lincoln. He rushed to the Petersen House across from Ford's Theatre, where Lincoln lay dying. Meigs stood at the front door of the house for the rest of the deathwatch. He alone decided who was admitted to the house. When Lincoln died at 7:22 am on April 15, Meigs moved into the parlor to sit with the president's body. During Lincoln's funeral procession in the city five days later, Meigs rode at the head of two battalions of quartermaster corps soldiers.

== Role in developing Arlington National Cemetery ==
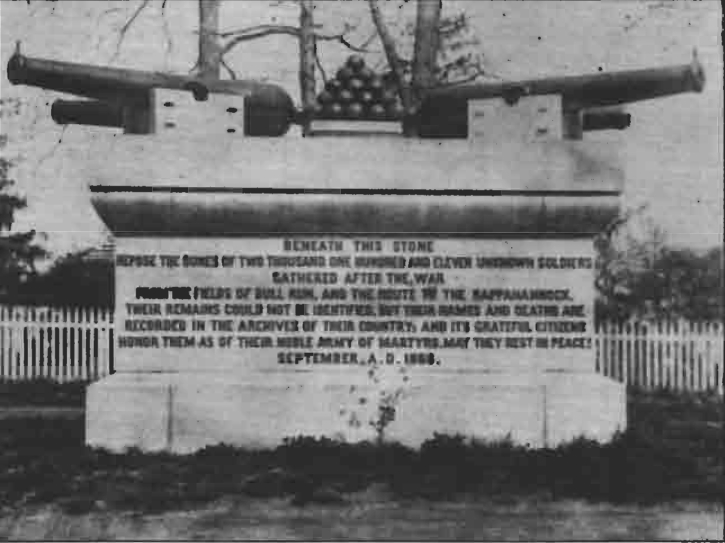
The Civil War Unknowns Monument c. 1866, designed by Montgomery Meigs.

Meigs played a critical role in developing Arlington National Cemetery, both during the Civil War and afterward.

Although most burials initially occurred near the freedmen's cemetery in the estate's northeast corner, in mid-June 1864 Meigs ordered that burials commence immediately on the grounds of Arlington House. Brigadier General René Edward De Russy was living in Arlington House at the time and opposed the burial of bodies close to his quarters, forcing new interments to occur far to the west (in what is now Section 1 of the cemetery). But Meigs still demanded that officers be buried on the grounds of the mansion, around the Lees' former flower garden. The first officer burial had occurred there on May 17, but with Meigs' order another 44 officers were buried along the southern and eastern sides within a month. By May 31, more than 2,600 burials had occurred in the cemetery, and Meigs ordered that a white picket fence be constructed around the burial grounds. In December 1865, Robert E. Lee's brother, Smith Lee, visited Arlington House and observed that the house could be made livable again if the graves around the flower garden were removed. Meigs hated Lee for betraying the Union, and ordered that more burials occur near the house to make it politically impossible for disinterment to occur.

Meigs himself designed and implemented most of the changes at the cemetery in the 15 years after the war. In 1865, for example, Meigs decided to build a monument to Civil War dead in the center of a grove of trees west of the Lee's flower garden. U.S. Army troops were dispatched to investigate every battlefield within a 35-mile (56 km) radius of the city of Washington, D.C. The bodies of 2,111 Union and Confederate dead were collected, most of them from the battlefields of First and Second Bull Run, as well as the Union army's retreat along the Rappahannock River (which occurred after both battles). Although Meigs had not intended to collect the remains of Confederate war dead, the inability to identify remains meant that both Union and Confederate dead were interred below the cenotaph. U.S. Army engineers chopped down most of the trees and dug a circular pit about 20 ft (6.1 m) wide and 20 ft (6.1 m) deep into the earth. The walls and floor were lined with brick, and it was segmented it into compartments with mortared brick walls. Into each compartment were placed a different body part: skulls, legs, arms, ribs, etc. The vault was half full by the time it was ready for sealing in September 1866. Meigs designed a 6-foot (1.8 m) tall, 12-foot (3.7 m) long, 4-foot (1.2 m) wide grey granite and concrete cenotaph to rest on top of the burial vault. The Civil War Unknowns Monument consists of two long, light grey granite slabs, with the shorter ends formed by sandwiching a smaller slab between the longer two. On the west face was an inscription describing the number of dead in the vault below, and honoring the "unknowns of the Civil War". Originally, a Rodman gun was placed on each corner, and a pyramid of shot adorned the center of the lid. A circular walk, centered 45 feet (14 m) from the center of the memorial, provided access. A walk led east to the flower garden, and another west to the road. Sod was laid around the memorial, and planting beds filled with annual plants emplaced.

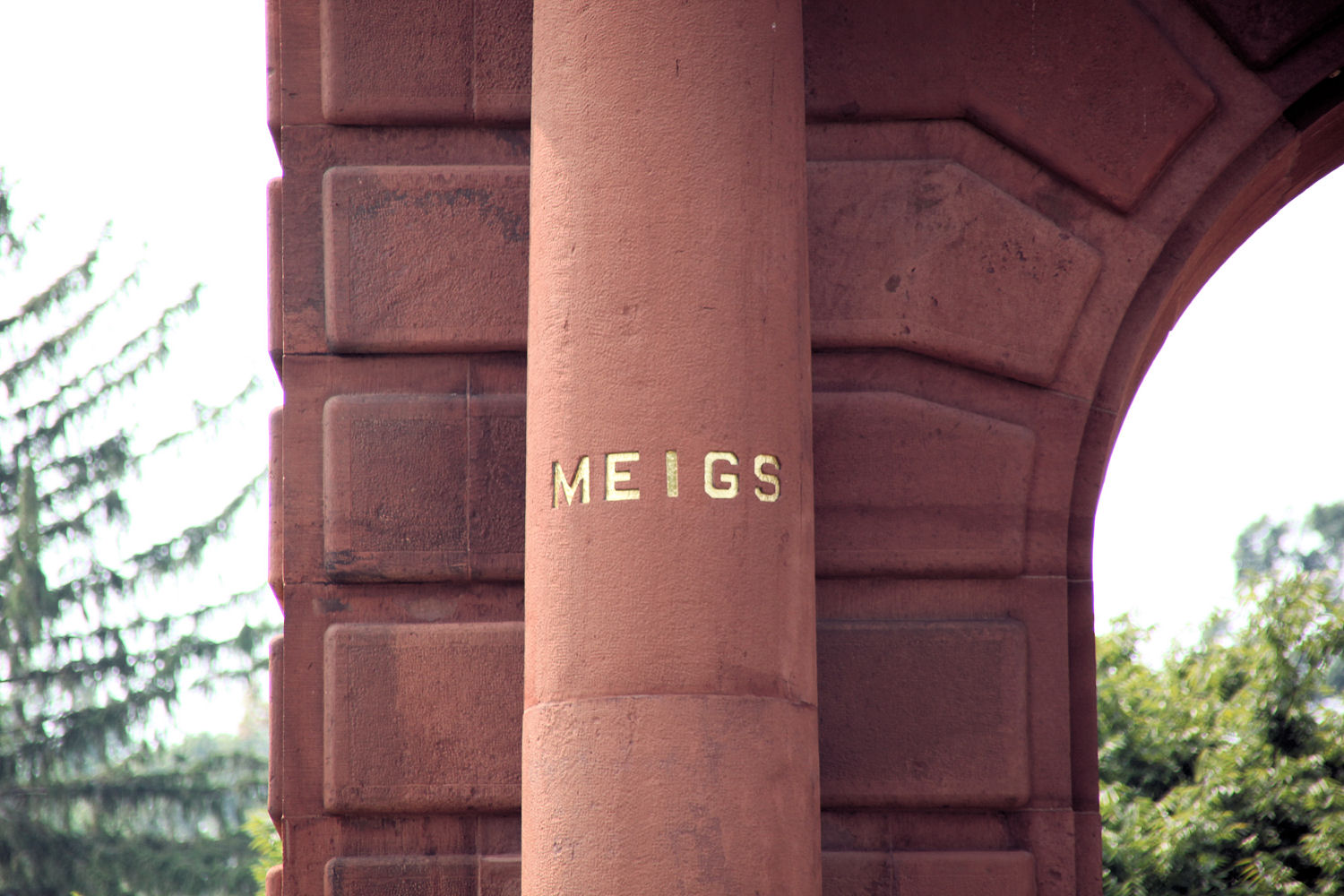
South column on the east side of the McClellan Gate, where Meigs had his own name inscribed.

Meigs made additional major changes to the cemetery in the 1870s. In 1870, he ordered that a "Sylvan Hall"—a series of three cruciform tree plantings, one inside the other—be planted in the "Field of the Dead" (in what is now Section 13). A year later, Meigs ordered the McClellan Gate constructed. Located just west of the intersection of what is today McClellan and Eisenhower Drives, this was originally Arlington National Cemetery's main gate. Built of red sandstone and red brick, the name "MCCLELLAN" tops the simple rectangular gate in gilt letters. But just below the name was inscribed the name "MEIGS"—a tribute to himself which Meigs could not help making. Due to the growing importance of the cemetery as well as the much larger crowds attending Memorial Day observances, Meigs also decided a formal meeting space at the cemetery was needed. A grove of trees southwest of Arlington House was cut down, and an amphitheater (today known as the Tanner Amphitheater) was constructed in 1874. Meigs himself designed the amphitheater.

Meigs continued to work to ensure that the Lee family could never take control of Arlington. In 1882, the Supreme Court of the United States ruled in United States v. Lee that the seizure of the Arlington estate at a tax sale by the United States was illegal, and returned the estate to George Washington Custis Lee, General Lee's oldest son. He, in turn, sold the estate back to the U.S. government for $150,000 in 1883. To commemorate the retention of the estate, in 1884 Meigs ordered that a Temple of Fame be erected in the Lee flower garden. The U.S. Patent Office building had suffered a massive fire in 1877. It was torn down and rebuilt in 1879, but the work went very slowly. Meigs ordered that stone columns, pediments, and entablatures which had been saved from the Patent Office be used to construct the Temple of Fame. The Temple was a round, Greek Revival, temple-like structure with Doric columns supporting a central dome. Inscribed on the pediment supporting the dome were the names of great Americans such as George Washington, Ulysses S. Grant, Abraham Lincoln, and David Farragut. A year after it was built, the names of Union Civil War generals were carved into its columns. Since not enough marble was available to rebuild the dome, a tin dome (molded and painted to look like marble) was installed, instead. The Temple of Fame was demolished in 1967.

== Postbellum career and death ==
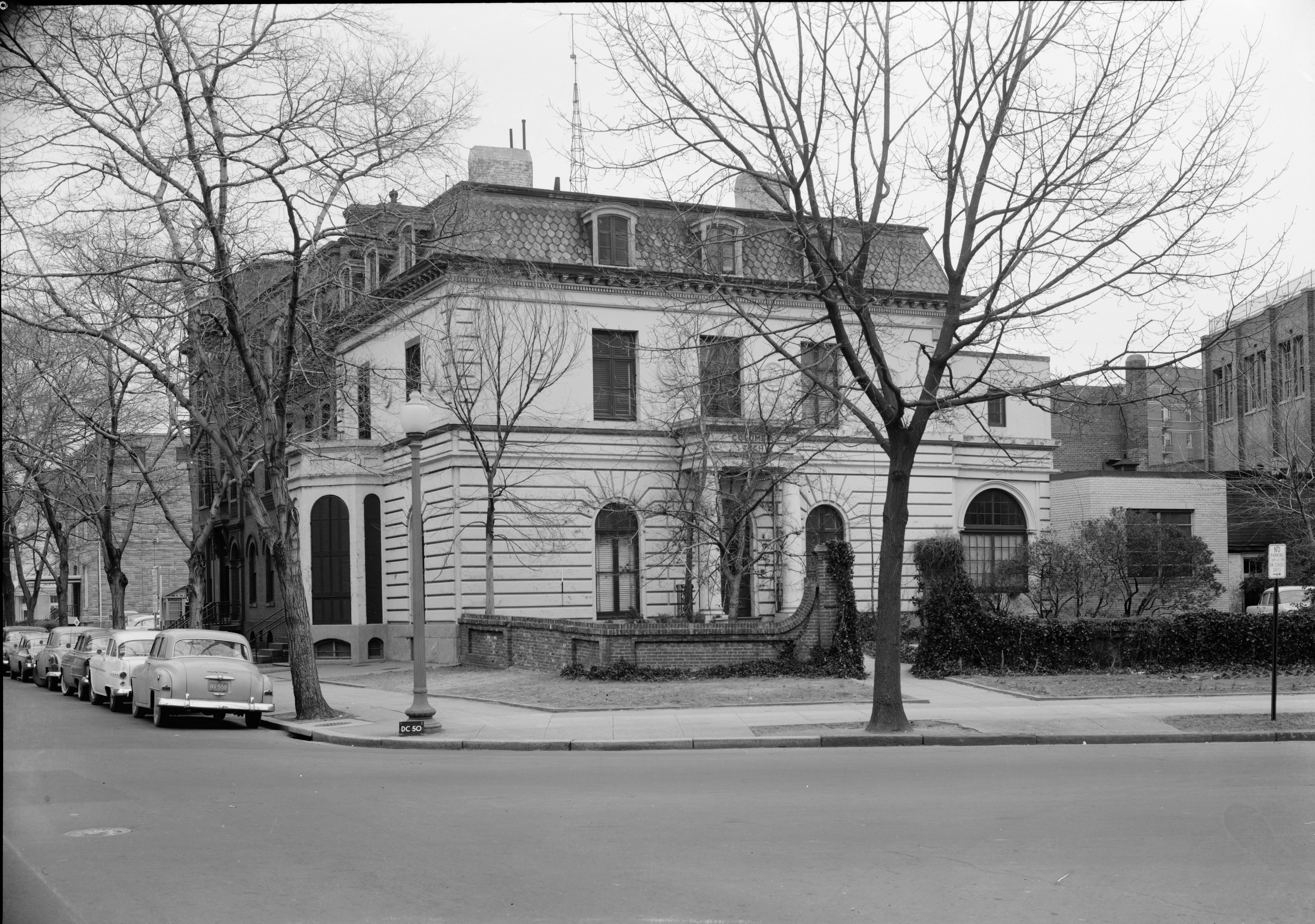
Looking southeast at the west (front) of Meigs' home (1958).

Meigs became a permanent resident of the District of Columbia after the war. He purchased a home located at 1239 Vermont Avenue NW (at the corner of Vermont Avenue and N Street).

As Quartermaster General after the Civil War, Meigs supervised plans for the new War Department building (constructed between 1866 and 1867), the National Museum (constructed in 1876), the extension of the Washington Aqueduct (constructed in 1876), and for a hall of records (constructed in 1878). Along with fellow Quartermaster Brigadier General Roeliff Brinkerhoff, Meigs edited a volume entitled, The Volunteer Quartermaster, a treatise which was considered the standard guide for the officers and employees of the quartermaster's department up until World War I.

From 1866 to 1868, to recuperate from the strain of his war service, Meigs visited Europe. From 1875 to 1876, he made another visit to study the organization of European armies, this time with nephew and Army officer Montgomery M. Macomb assigned as aide-de-camp. After his retirement on February 6, 1882, he was succeeded by Daniel H. Rucker and became architect of the Pension Office Building, now home to the National Building Museum. He was a regent of the Smithsonian Institution, a member of the American Philosophical Society, a co-founder of the Philosophical Society of Washington, and one of the earliest members of the National Academy of Sciences.

=== Pension Building (1882 to 1887) ===
Following the end of the Civil War, the US Congress passed legislation that greatly extended the scope of pension coverage for both veterans and their survivors and dependents, notably their widows and orphans. This greatly increased the number of staff needed to administer the new benefits system. More than 1,500 clerks were required, and a new building was needed to house them. Meigs was chosen to design and construct the new building, now the National Building Museum. He broke away from the established Greco-Roman models that had been the basis of government buildings in Washington, D.C., until then, and was to continue following the completion of the Pension Building. Meigs based his design on Italian Renaissance precedents, notably Rome's Palazzo Farnese and Palazzo della Cancelleria.

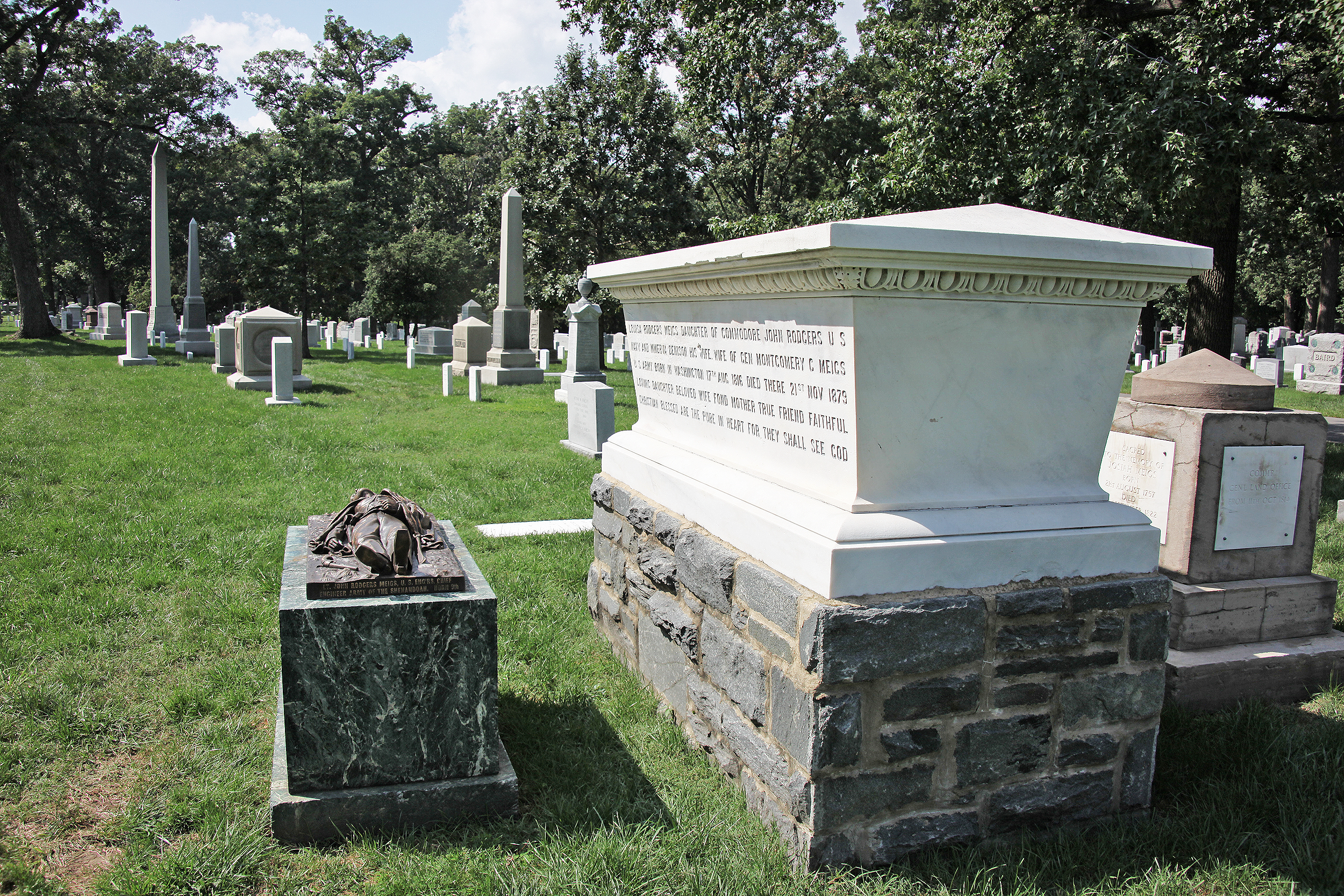
The white tomb of Montgomery C. Meigs: To the left is the sarcophagus Meigs designed for his son, John (shown in high relief). To the right is a marker above the graves of his father and grandfather, who were reinterred next to him.

Included in his design was a 1,200-foot (370 m) long sculptured frieze executed by Caspar Buberl. Since creating a work of sculpture of that size was well out of Meigs's budget, he had Buberl create 28 different scenes (totaling 69 feet (21 m) in length), which were then mixed and slightly modified to create the continuous 1,200-foot (370 m) long parade that includes over 1,300 figures. Because of the way the 28 sections are modified and mixed up, only somewhat careful examination reveals the frieze to be the same figures repeated over and over. The sculpture includes infantry, navy, artillery, cavalry, and medical components, as well as a good deal of the supply and quartermaster functions. Meigs's correspondence with Buberl reveals that Meigs insisted that one teamster, "must be a negro, a plantation slave, freed by war," be included in the quartermaster panel. This figure was ultimately to assume a position in the center, over the west entrance to the building.

When Philip Sheridan was asked to comment on the building, his reply echoed the sentiment of many of the Washington establishment of the day, that the only thing that he could find wrong with the building was that it was fireproof. (A similar quote is also attributed to William T. Sherman, so the story might well be apocryphal.) The completed building, sometimes referred to as "Meigs's Old Red Barn", was created by using more than 15,000,000 bricks, which, according to the wits of the day, were all counted by the parsimonious Meigs.

=== Death ===
Meigs contracted a cold on December 27, 1891. Within a few days, it turned into pneumonia. Meigs died at home at 5:00 pm on January 2, 1892. His body was interred with high military honors in Arlington National Cemetery. General orders issued at the time of his death declared, "the Army has rarely possessed an officer ... who was entrusted by the government with a great variety of weighty responsibilities, or who proved himself more worthy of confidence."

== Family ==
In 1841, Meigs married Louisa Rodgers (1816–1879), the daughter of Commodore John Rodgers. Their children included:

- John Rodgers Meigs (1842–1864), a West Point graduate and Army officer who was killed in action during the Civil War
- Mary Montgomery Meigs (1843–1930), the wife of Army officer Joseph Hancock Taylor, who was the son of Union Army Brigadier General Joseph Pannell Taylor, and nephew of President Zachary Taylor
- Charles Delucena Meigs (1845–1853), who was named for Meigs' father
- Montgomery Meigs (1847–1931), a civil engineer who enjoyed a long career in railroad, bridge, canal, power plant, and road construction
- Vincent Trowbridge Meigs (1851–1853)
- Louisa Rodgers Meigs (1854–1922), the wife of British journalist Archibald Forbes

== Honors ==
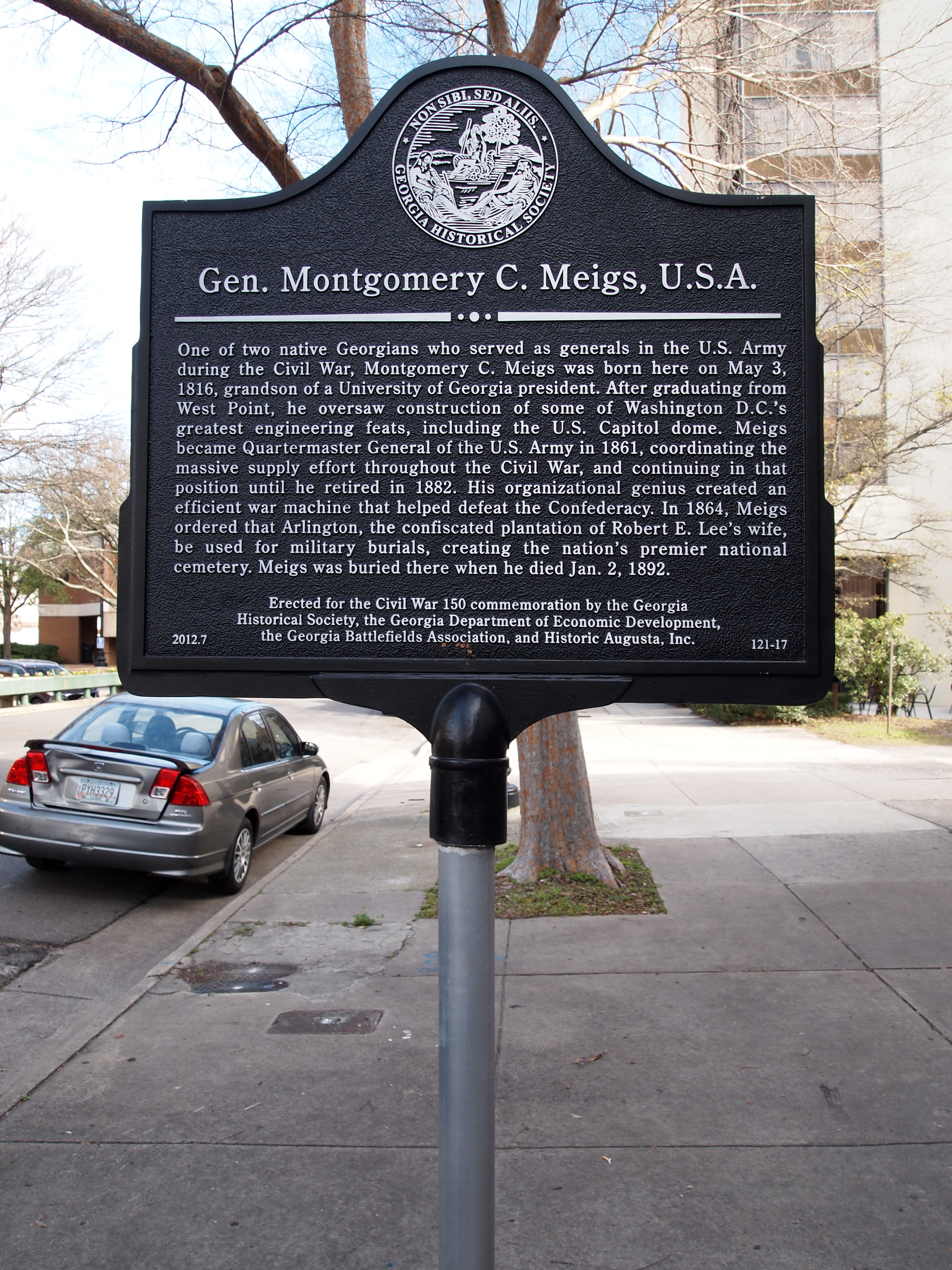
The Gen. Montgomery C. Meigs, U.S.A. historical marker in Augusta, Georgia, erected by the Georgia Historical Society in 2012.

- General Meigs was inducted into the Quartermaster Hall of Fame in its charter year of 1986.
- In 2012, the Georgia Historical Society erected a historical marker at the birthplace of Gen. Montgomery C. Meigs in Augusta, Georgia.
- Camp Meigs, in Readville, Massachusetts was named after him.

=== Ships ===
- General Meigs, a Quartermaster Corps passenger and freight steamer built in 1892 and serving in the early 20th century.
- USAT Meigs, an Army transport ship sunk at Darwin, Northern Territory.
- USS General M. C. Meigs (AP-116), a troop transport launched in 1944, serving in WWII and Korea.

== See also ==
- List of American Civil War generals (Union)

== Bibliography ==
- Atkinson, Rick. Where Valor Rests: Arlington National Cemetery. Washington, D.C.: National Geographic Society, 2007.
- Bednar, Michael J. L' Enfant's Legacy: Public Open Spaces in Washington, D.C. Baltimore, Md.: Johns Hopkins University Press, 2006.
- Browning, Charles Henry. Americans of Royal Descent. Baltimore, Md.: Genealogical Publishing, 1911.
- Cultural Landscape Program. Arlington House: The Robert E. Lee Memorial Cultural Landscape Report. National Capital Region. National Park Service. U.S. Department of the Interior. Washington, D.C.: 2001.
- Dickinson, William C. and Dean A. Herrin. Montgomery C. Meigs and the Building of the Nation's Capital (2002)
- East, Sherrod E. "Montgomery C. Meigs and the Quartermaster Department." Military Affairs (1961): 183–196. [ in JSTOR]
- Eicher, John H. and Eicher, David J. Civil War High Commands. Palo Alto, Calif: Stanford University Press, 2001, ISBN 0-8047-3641-3.
- Farwell, Byron. The Encyclopedia of Nineteenth-Century Land Warfare. New York: Norton, 2001.
- Field, Cynthia R. "A Rich Repast of Classicism: Meigs and Classical Sources." In Montgomery C. Meigs and the Building of the Nation's Capital. William C Dickinson, Dean A Herrin, and Donald R Kennon, eds. Athens, Ohio: United States Capitol Historical Society, 2001.
- Freeman, Douglas S. R. E. Lee, A Biography. 4 vol. New York: Scribners, 1934.
- Hannan, Caryn, ed. Georgia Biographical Dictionary. Vol. 1. Hamburg, Mich.: State History Publications, 2008.
- Herrin, Dean A. "The Eclectic Engineer: Montgomery C. Meigs and His Engineering Projects." In Montgomery C. Meigs and the Building of the Nation's Capital. William C Dickinson, Dean A Herrin, and Donald R Kennon, eds. Athens, Ohio: United States Capitol Historical Society, 2001.
- Holt, Dean W. American Military Cemeteries. Jefferson, N.C.: McFarland & Co., 2010.
- Hughes, Nathaniel Cheairs and Ware, Thomas Clayton. Theodore O'Hara: Poet-Soldier of the Old South. Lexington, Ky.: University of Tennessee Press, 1998.
- McDaniel, Joyce L. The Collected Works of Caspar Buberl: An Analysis of a Nineteenth Century American Sculptor Master's Thesis. Wellesley University, 1976.
- Miller, David W. Second Only to Grant: Quartermaster General Montgomery C. Meigs. Shippensburg, Pa.: White Maine Books, 2000.
- Morton, Thomas G. The History of the Pennsylvania Hospital, 1751-1895. Philadelphia: Times Printing House, 1895.
- Peters, James Edward. Arlington National Cemetery, Shrine to America's Heroes. Bethesda, Md.: Woodbine House, 2000.
- Poole, Robert M. On Hallowed Ground: The Story of Arlington National Cemetery. New York: Walker, 2009.
- R., C. D. (1933). "Meigs, Montgomery Cunningham". In Malone, Dumas (ed.). Dictionary of American Biography. Vol. 12 (McCrady-Millington). New York: Charles Scribner's Sons. pp. 507–508 – via Internet Archive.
- Schama, Simon. The American Future: A History. New York: Ecco, 2009.
- Scott, Pamela and Lee, Antoinette J. Buildings of the District of Columbia, Oxford University Press, New York, 1993.
- Ulbrich, David. "Montgomery Cunningham Meigs." In Encyclopedia of the American Civil War: A Political, Social, and Military History. David S. Heidler, and Jeanne T. Heidler, eds. New York: W. W. Norton & Company, 2000. ISBN 0-393-04758-X.
- Weigley, Russell F. (1959). Quartermaster General of the Union Army: A Biography of M.C. Meigs. Columbia University Press – via Questia.
- Wilson, Mark R. The Business of Civil War: Military Mobilization and the State, 1861-1865. Baltimore, Md.: Johns Hopkins University Press, 2006.
- Wolff, Wendy, ed. Capitol Builder: The Shorthand Journals of Montgomery C. Meigs. Washington, D.C.: U.S. Government Printing Office, 2001.
