= Cornelia Meigs =

American children's writer

- Born: December 6, 1884; Rock Island, Illinois
- Died: September 10, 1973; Havre de Grace, Maryland
- Occupations: Writer, teacher
- Writing career
- Pen name: Adair Aldon
- Period: 1915–1970 (as author)
- Genres: Children's fiction, biography
- Subjects: History of children's literature, literary criticism
- Notable works: Invincible Louisa; A Critical History of Children's Literature
- Notable awards: Newbery Medal; 1934

Cornelia Lynde Meigs (1884–1973) was an American writer of fiction and biography for children, teacher of English and writing, historian and critic of children's literature. She won the Newbery Medal for her 1933 biography of Louisa May Alcott, entitled Invincible Louisa. She also wrote three Newbery Honor Books.

== Life ==
Cornelia Meigs was born December 6, 1884, to civil engineer Montgomery C. Meigs, Jr. and Grace Lynde Meigs in Rock Island, Illinois, the fifth of six daughters. Her sister Grace Meigs Crowder became a noted physician.The family moved to Keokuk, Iowa when she was one month old. After graduating from Keokuk High School in 1901 she attended Bryn Mawr College, receiving an A.B. degree in 1907.

Meigs began writing children's books while an English teacher at St. Katherine's School in Davenport, Iowa. Her first book, The Kingdom of the Winding Road, was published by Macmillan US in 1915. In 1922 she was one runner-up for the inaugural Newbery Medal from the professional librarians, recognizing the previous year's "most distinguished contribution to American literature for children". Members of the American Library Association were asked to nominate a book and The Windy Hill by Meigs was the last of six that received at least two votes subsequently designated runners-up. She was one of the runners-up again in 1929 (Clearing Weather) and 1933 (Swift Rivers). Runner-up works are now called Newbery Honor Books, so latter-day editions are authorized to display a silver seal on the cover.

Meigs won a Little, Brown and Co. prize competition with The Trade Wind. Little, Brown published that book in 1927 and subsequently a few more of her works including the children's biographies of Louisa May Alcott and Jane Addams. Meigs is best known for the Alcott biography, Invincible Louisa: The Story of the Author of "Little Women", which won the Newbery Medal in 1934. It follows Alcott from childhood in Pennsylvania and Boston through writing the classic novel Little Women. Kirkus Reviews called Meigs "one of the best-loved authors of fiction for boys and girls", observed that Little Women is "virtually autobiographical", and recommended that the books be paired.

In 1932, Meigs became a professor of English at Bryn Mawr, where she remained until her retirement in 1950. During World War II she took a year of absence for three years to work for the War Department. After leaving Bryn Mawr, Meigs taught writing at the New School of Social Research in New York City. She was the lead editor and one writer of A Critical History of Children's Literature, published by Macmillan in 1953, which has been called "a landmark in the field of children's literature". It was revised under Meigs' leadership and re-issued in 1969. In her lifetime Meigs wrote over 30 fiction books for children, as well as two plays, two biographies, and several books and articles for adults.

Meigs lived at Sion Hill, Havre de Grace, Maryland; and Brandon, Vermont. She died at Havre de Grace, Maryland, on September 10, 1973. Most of her papers are in the Special Collections Library at Dartmouth College. Others are in the de Grummond Collection at the University of Southern Mississippi in Hattiesburg and at the University of Iowa in Iowa City.

== Awards ==
- 1915 Drama League prize, The Steadfast Princess
- 1922 Newbery runner-up, Windy Hill
- 1928 Newbery runner-up, Clearing Weather
- 1933 Newbery runner-up, Swift Rivers
- 1927 Beacon Hill Bookshelf Prize, The Trade Wind
- 1934 Newbery Medal, Invincible Louisa
- 1963 Lewis Carroll Shelf Award, Invincible Louisa

== Letter ==
For a glimpse into her life, here are excerpts from a letter sent to an Albert Northrop, presumed husband to her niece Elizabeth (Betty):

January 29, 1950.

Dear Albert,

Your nice birthday letter should have had an answer long before this, but so many things do seem to come between me and writing even the letters that I want so much to write. The birthday was a very portentous one, my sixty-fifth, which means I am no longer eligible for Bryn Mawr after June; they have to keep me until then. By a singular chance they have given me more work to do than ever before, quite regardless of the fact that in six months I shall be considered totally unfit ...

You were so good to speak so kindly of Violent Men and Two Arrows. The former had been in hand for a very long time, quite the largest piece of work I had ever undertaken, but it has been the one that I most enjoyed. I have a real passion for history, which grows as the years go by, and was whetted ever more by my seeing some of it being made first hand while I was doing a very humble job in Washington. I realized that if I did not finish it while I was at Bryn Mawr I never would, so I finally succeeded in getting it finished and out of my hands. The Macmillan Company had it for a long time before they published it, so, since I had promised a child's book as the very next thing, I wrote that last year and they came out rather embarrassingly close together. You were a very good friend to read them both. You always give such nice detailed comments, not like the reviewers, or sometimes even the writer of the blurb on the cover who have visibly not got much farther than Chapter six or so ...

Nina (signed in her hand)

== Selected works ==
Frontispiece, The Windy Hill

=== Children's fiction ===
- The Kingdom of the Winding Road, The Macmillan Company, 1915
- Master Simon's Garden, Macmillan, 1916
- The Pool of Stars, Macmillan, 1919
- The Windy Hill, Macmillan, 1921
- The Trade Wind, Little, Brown & Co., 1927
- The Wonderful Locomotive, Macmillan, 1928
- Clearing Weather, Little Brown, 1928
- The Crooked Apple Tree, Little Brown, 1929
- Swift Rivers, Macmillan, 1934
- The Covered Bridge, Macmillan, 1936
- Young Americans, Ginn & Co., 1936
- The Scarlet Oak, Macmillan, 1938
- Call of the Mountain, Little Brown, 1940
- The Two Arrows, Macmillan, 1949
- The Dutch Colt, Macmillan, 1952
- Wild Geese Flying, Macmillan, 1957
- Mystery at the Red House, Macmillan, 1961
- Willow Whistle
- As the Crow Flies
- The Mounted Messenger
- The New Moon
- Rain on the Roof
- The Vanished Island
- Wind in the Chimney
- Fair Wind to Virginia

=== Fiction as Adair Aldon ===
- The Island of Appledore, Macmillan, 1917
- The Pirate of Jasper Peak, Macmillan, 1918
- At the Sign of the Two Heroes, The Century Company, 1920
- The Hill of Adventure, Century, 1922

=== Plays ===
- The Steadfast Princess, Macmillan, 1916
- Helga and the White Peacock, Macmillan, 1922

=== Biographies ===
- Invincible Louisa: The Story of the Author of "Little Women", Little Brown, 1933
- Jane Adams: Pioneer for Social Justice: A Biography, Little Brown, 1970

=== For adults ===
- Railroad West, Little Brown, 1937, (novel)
- The Violent Men: A Study of Human Relations in the First American Congress, Macmillan, 1949
- A Critical History of Children's Literature: A Survey of Children's Books in English from Earliest Times to the Present, Prepared in Four Parts Under the Editorship of Cornelia Meigs, Macmillan, 1953 (624pp); Cornelia Meigs with Anne Thaxter Eaton, Elizabeth Nesbitt and Ruth Hill Viguers

Second edition, A Critical History of Children's Literature: A Survey of Children's Books in English, Macmillan, 1969 (708pp)

- What Makes a College? A History of Bryn Mawr, Macmillan, 1956
