= Montgomery Atwater =

American writer

- Monty Atwater on skis
- Born: 1904; Baker City, Oregon
- Died: 1976 (aged 71–72)
- Education: Harvard College, 1926
- Known for: Avalanche research and forecasting
- Scientific career
- Fields: Snow Science, Author
- Workplaces: United States Forest Service, 1945–

Montgomery Meigs "Monty" Atwater (1904–1976) was an American avalanche researcher, forester, skier, and author. He is considered the founder of the field of avalanche research and forecasting in North America.

== Early life ==
In 1904, Atwater was born in Baker City, Oregon to Mary Meigs and Maxwell Wanton Atwater.

== Education ==
Atwater was educated privately at Phillips Exeter Academy and graduated with an AB in English Literature from Harvard College in 1926.

== Career ==
Atwater worked a number of jobs including football coach, cattle rancher, and trapper. He lived in Montana in the 1930s and wrote short stories and mysteries, some under the pseudonym of Max Montgomery.

During World War II, Atwater served in the 10th Mountain Division as a winter warfare instructor. Atwater reached the rank of captain while in active combat duty and being wounded. Atwater was discharged due to his injury.

In autumn 1945, Atwater became a forest ranger for the Wasatch National Forest where he managed public safety in Little Cottonwood Canyon in Alta, Utah. Over the next two decades he established the first avalanche research center in the Western Hemisphere at Alta, inventing many of the techniques and much of the equipment needed for avalanche forecasting and control.

In 1960, Atwater served as the Avalanche Control Chief during the 1960 Winter Olympics in Squaw Valley, California. Atwater successfully prevented any major avalanches during the Games despite a history of huge chairlift-destroying avalanches there.

In 1960s, with Frank Parsoneault, Atwater developed the Mark 10 Avalaunchers, a pneumatic cannon for launching avalanche control explosives.

In 1964, Atwater retired from the Forest Service. In 1966, he repeated his masterful job of avalanche control at the alpine skiing World Championships in Portillo, Chile, where the ski area had been almost completely destroyed by massive avalanches only a year earlier but successfully held the Championships unscathed. He also served as a consultant to ski areas, mining companies, and telecommunication companies throughout the mountainous regions of North and South America.

Atwater ran a small research lab in Squaw Valley.

== Personal life ==
In 1945, Atwater moved to Alta, Utah.

Atwater had three sons, James E. Atwater, Robert and Montgomery.

In 1976, Atwater died of a heart attack.

== Awards ==
- 1973 Father of snow avalanche work in the United States. Named by National Ski Patrol, U.S. Forest Service and the National Park Service.
- 1979 U.S. Ski and Snowboard Hall of Fame.

== Bibliography ==
General books

- Atwater, Montgomery M. (1968). The Avalanche Hunters. Macrae Smith Company. ISBN 0-8255-1345-6.
- Atwater, Montgomery M. (1953). Avalanche Handbook. USDA Forest Service.
- Atwater, Montgomery M.; LaChapelle, Edward R. (1961). The Climax Avalanche: A Study in Case Histories. USDA Forest Service.
- Atwater, Montgomery M. (1969). The Forest Rangers. Macrae Smith Company. ISBN 0-8255-1346-4.
- Engen, Sverre; Atwater, Montgomery M. (1947). Ski with Sverre: Deep Snow and Packed Slope Ski Technique. New Directions.

Young Adult/Juvenile Fiction

- Atwater, Montgomery M. (1940). Government Hunter. Macmillan.
- Atwater, Montgomery M. (1941). Flaming Forest. Little, Brown and Company.
- Atwater, Montgomery M. (1943). Ski Patrol. Random House.
- Atwater, Montgomery M. (1947). Hank Winton: Smokechaser. Random House.
- Atwater, Montgomery M. (1949). Smoke Patrol. Random House.
- Atwater, Montgomery M. (1951). Avalanche Patrol. Random House.
- Atwater, Montgomery M. (1952). Rustlers on the High Range. Random House.
- Atwater, Montgomery M. (1954). Cattle Dog. Random House.
- Atwater, Montgomery M. (1956). The Trouble Hunters. Random House.
- Atwater, Montgomery M. (1959). The Ski Lodge Mystery. Random House.
- Atwater, Montgomery M. (1967). Snow Rangers of the Andes. Random House. ISBN 0-394-91899-1.
