= John Rodgers Meigs =

Union United States Army officer (1842–1864)

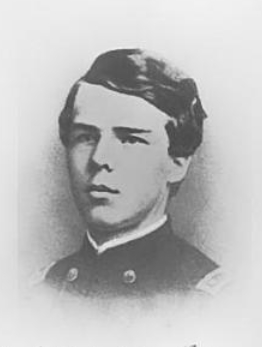
- John Rodgers Meigs circa 1864
- Born: February 9, 1842; Washington, D.C., U.S.
- Died: October 3, 1864 (aged 22); Dayton, Virginia, U.S.
- Burial place: Arlington National Cemetery
- Relatives: Montgomery C. Meigs, father
- Military career
- Allegiance: United States; Union
- Branch: United States Army; Union Army
- Service years: 1863-1864
- Rank: 1st Lieutenant; Bvt. Major
- Conflicts: American Civil War

John Rodgers Meigs (February 9, 1842 – October 3, 1864) was an officer in the Union Army during the American Civil War. He was the son of Brigadier General Montgomery C. Meigs, the Quartermaster General of the United States Army. He participated in the First Battle of Bull Run, and later testified in the court-martial trial of an officer involved in the retreat from the battle. He attended the United States Military Academy, where he was an acting assistant professor of mathematics and graduated first in his class in June 1863. He was lauded by Secretary of War Edwin M. Stanton for strengthening the defenses of Baltimore, Maryland; was an engineer and acting aide-de-camp on the staff of Brigadier General (Volunteers) William W. Averell; was Chief Engineer of the Shenandoah Valley for the Department of West Virginia; and was Chief Engineer of the Middle Military Division and aide-de-camp to General Phillip Sheridan. The circumstances under which Meigs died led to the burning of Dayton, Virginia, in retaliation. His funeral was a public event attended by President Abraham Lincoln, Stanton, and numerous government dignitaries. A book of Meigs' letters were published in 2006 under the title A Civil War Soldier of Christ and Country: The Selected Correspondence of John Rodgers Meigs, 1859-64.

== Early life ==
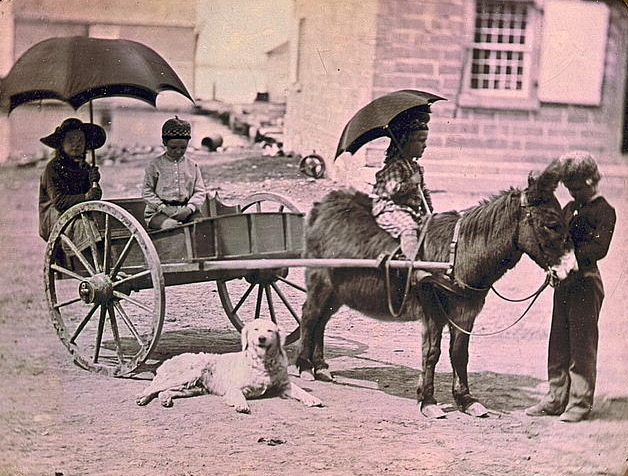
Tinted daguerreotype circa 1853 of (left to right) Mary, Charles, Vincent, and John Rodgers Meigs in Detroit, Michigan.

Meigs was born February 9, 1842, in Washington, D.C., to Major General Montgomery C. Meigs and Louisa Rodgers Meigs. He was the oldest of seven children. Three of his siblings—Charles Delucena (1845-1853), Vincent Trowbridge (1851-1853), and an unnamed stillborn daughter (b. 1847)—died. He and three others (Mary Montgomery, Montgomery Jr., and Louisa Rodgers) survived into adulthood. John was also the maternal grandson of United States Navy Commodore John Rodgers, a hero of the War of 1812.

Meigs' father was assigned to a number of military posts while John was young, and the family moved often. After his birth, his father was assigned to Fort Wayne near modern-day Detroit, Michigan. He was largely taught at home in these formative years. He began speaking at an early age, learned the alphabet while still very young, and was reading and writing by the age of four. In 1849, the Meigs family returned to the District of Columbia, but in October 1850 they moved to Rouses Point, New York, where John's father was engaged in building Fort Montgomery. John had a violent temper and often bullied his siblings, behaviors which deeply concerned his parents.

The Meigs family returned to Washington, D.C., on November 3, 1852, after Montgomery Meigs was assigned to design and finish the Washington Aqueduct (a public works project which brought large amounts of fresh water to Washington, D.C., for the first time). His parents finally enrolled him in school (public or private is not clear). But his discipline problems continued. After one particularly violent temper tantrum, his father tied John's wrists together, tied him to a chest of drawers, and left him there all afternoon without allowing him to eat lunch. When Meigs learned that his son had untied himself, he spanked him with the rope.

John Rodgers Meigs was generally an excellent student in school. He liked a wide variety of subjects, excelled in science, and knew more than most children his age. In the fall of 1856, he enrolled at Columbian College in the District of Columbia as a freshman, even though he was only 14 years old.

== Military career ==
=== Appointment to West Point ===
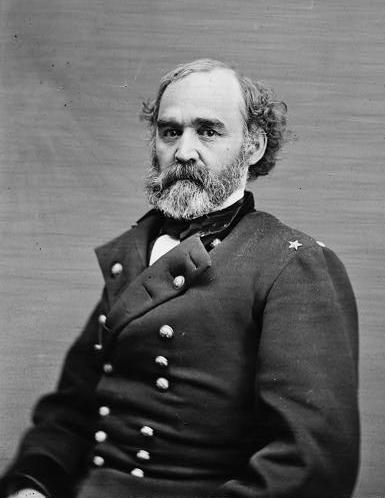
Montgomery C. Meigs, John's father, personally intervened with President James Buchanan to win his son an appointment to the U.S. Military Academy.

By 1858, John Rodgers Meigs was more interested in a military career like his father's than he was in obtaining a college education. In December 1857, he applied for entrance into the United States Military Academy (better known as "West Point"). His mother strongly supported the move, but his father was more equivocal.

John's application ran into problems, however. On December 16, 1857, Senator Jefferson Davis (Secretary of War from March 7, 1853, to March 4, 1857, and Montgomery Meigs' political protector) advised that since John was the son of an Army officer, he had to seek an "at large" appointment to West Point. But at-large appointments needed the approval of Secretary of War John B. Floyd, a corrupt and venal politician who strongly disliked Montgomery Meigs. At Montgomery Meigs' urging, Davis and 11 other senators wrote a letter to Floyd supporting John Meigs' application to West Point, noting as well his relationship to Commodore Meigs. But Floyd blocked the appointment.

John applied to West Point again in November 1858. Meigs' father met personally with President James Buchanan to win his son's appointment, but John was refused again when the new appointment list came out in March 1859. Montgomery Meigs learned that Floyd had again blocked his son's appointment. Meigs again approached President Buchanan, who told Meigs that he should meet with Floyd. On June 25, Meigs met with Floyd and openly admitted how distasteful the meeting was to him. He gave Floyd a letter in which he outlined his objections to the rejection of John's appointment, and requested that it be reconsidered. Floyd admitted to blocking John's appointment, but said that Meigs had opposed him "in everything" regarding construction of the Washington Aqueduct and the United States Capitol dome and said he would resign from the cabinet if John Meigs' appointment had been approved. Floyd was particularly offended that Montgomery Meigs had seen Buchanan about the appointment rather than him. Meigs apologized, claiming he did not intend to make an end run around Floyd. Floyd accepted the apology, and promised that John would get an appointment if a vacancy occurred.

A vacancy opened in September 1859, and Buchanan personally delivered the appointment to Montgomery Meigs. Meigs thanked Floyd in a letter. He gave a copy of it to John, telling him to save it and to remember that John B. Floyd was his patron.

=== West Point education ===
John Rodgers Meigs entered West Point on September 7, 1859. He initially found it difficult to fit in at West Point. His parents wrote him frequently, advising him to maintain the highest moral standards, work on developing the highest social graces, and to seek as much glory and official recognition as possible. They criticized the smallest things, such as omitting to date a letter or slurping his soup. His father urged him to learn how to read Greek and Latin, and to read only the best books such as compilations of famous people's letters, histories, and those novels which taught only the highest moral values.

He seemed little able to take their advice. In November 1860, the academy sent a report to Meigs' parents, informing them that their son had received 74 demerits. Should he receive 100 demerits, he would be expelled. John argued that the demerits were unfair, since his first lieutenant disliked him irrationally and did not given the proper military or personal respect he deserved.

=== Bull Run ===
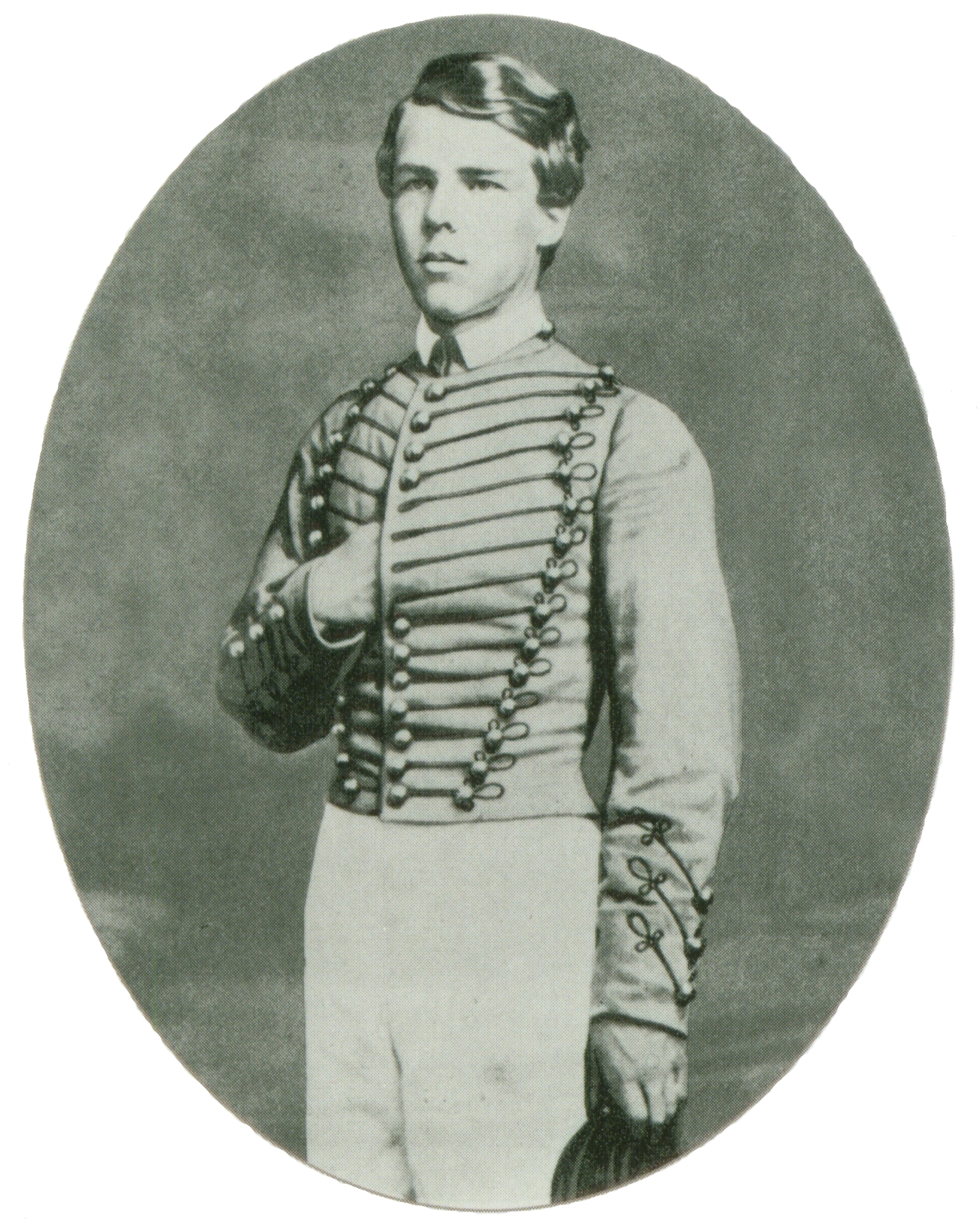
Portrait of John Rodgers Meigs while he was a cadet at West Point.

The Civil War broke out on April 12, 1861. Many of the cadets at West Point were eager to engage in the fighting, but many teachers at West Point resigned to fight for the Confederacy and the Union Army desperately needed more trained officers. By now, John's father had been promoted to brigadier general, and was helping to reinforce several Union-held forts in the Deep South. He took a ship to Fort Pickens in Pensacola, Florida, and retrieved Major Henry J. Hunt and a unit of artillery and brought them back to Washington, D.C. But with so few officers left in the Union Army's ranks, John felt it urgent that he join the fighting, at least temporarily. John asked his father for a furlough to join in the defense of Washington, and General Meigs gave his permission. The furlough commenced on July 2 and ended on August 28. On July 18, Cadet John Rodgers Meigs arrived at his parents' house.

The same day Meigs arrived back home, he joined Hunt's Light Company M, 2nd United States Artillery, newly reconstituted and now a reserve unit attached to General Irvin McDowell's Army of Northeastern Virginia. The following day, McDowell assigned Company M to Colonel Israel B. Richardson's 4th Brigade, Second Michigan Volunteers. Sources vary as to what John Meigs' official role was. Several, including the official U.S. Army biographical register, claim he was an aide-de-camp to Colonel Richardson. However, others note that he was formally assigned to Major Hunt's Light Company M. Among these are the Meigs' family, and Meigs himself. It is clear, however, that he carried orders and acted as an observer for Hunt and carried orders for Richardson.

On July 21, 1861, John participated in the First Battle of Bull Run, a disastrous Union defeat just a few miles from the national capital. Most of the Union Army panicked and fled in a disorderly retreat. For a time during the tumultuous battle, Meigs directed the fire and movement of troops in the absence of commanding officers. Meigs' unit fell back on Fairfax, Virginia. Without orders to do so, John left the unit and returned to the capital. He reached his parents' home at about 8 A.M., and let them know he was uninjured. He said he left Company M to report to Lieutenant General Winfield Scott, commander-in-chief of all Union armed forces. Although John wished to return to his unit, his father ordered him to depart for West Point after reporting to General Scott.

Cadet Meigs received high praise from his superiors. Major Hunt later wrote: On the death of Lieutenant Craig, Cadet Meigs performed his duties until the close of action with spirit and intelligence, and was very useful, after the affair was over, in conveying orders, observing the enemy, and rallying our troops. Colonel Richardson, too, lauded him. He wrote in his after-action report, "Meigs carried my orders promptly, and a braver and more gallant young man was never in service." He also praised John in a letter to General Meigs, saying, the "gallant conduct of your son, and his exertions in carrying orders for me in the field" "recommended him to be immediately made a Lieut. in the regular Army." Secretary of War Simon Cameron offered to give John a commission as a Second lieutenant, but General Meigs prevailed on the Secretary to send his son back to school. Instead, Cameron wrote a glowing letter of commendation to Cadet Meigs on December 15, 1861.

=== Remainder of West Point education ===
Meigs was appointed sergeant in the Battalion of Cadets on August 29, 1861. Two days later, he was detailed to the mathematics department under the supervision of Professor Albert E. Church.

But on August 19, Meigs became a participant in a court-martial proceeding against Colonel Dixon S. Miles. Miles and Richardson covered the retreat of McDowell's forces at Bull Run. They argued during the retreat, and Richardson accused Miles of drunkenness. In his defense, Miles claimed that Cadet Meigs had issued orders which he was not authorized to give, and that this was part of the cause of the disagreement between himself and Richardson on July 21. Miles produced at least three witnesses who testified that Meigs had given orders. Meigs admitted to suggesting courses of action, but denied absolutely giving any orders.

John Rodgers Meigs' remaining education at West Point went far more smoothly than his first year. His parents continued to urge him to attain the highest honors in academics, deportment, and military glory. He became sensitive to the slightest attack on his honor, and engaged in a brawl with another cadet on May 17, 1862, after receiving a mild insult on the parade ground. Both men beat each other so brutally they both required hospitalization, although Meigs was much worse off (he lost the fight and could not continue). A military tribunal found Meigs guilty of fighting, court-martialed him, and sentenced him to a year's suspension. But the tribunal itself asked for the sentence to be dismissed. Secretary of War Cameron reviewed the sentence and ordered it reduced to confinement to camp for the duration of the summer.

By early 1863, John was an acting assistant professor at West Point, teaching courses in calculus and surveying. He graduated first in his class from West Point on June 11, 1863, and was immediately commissioned a First Lieutenant of Engineers.

== War service and death ==
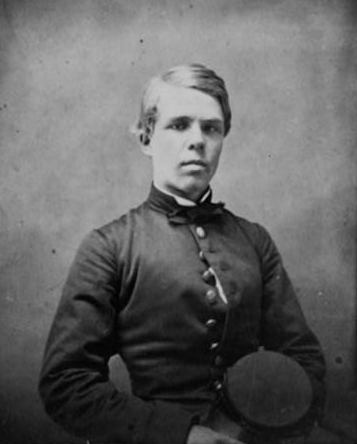
John Rodgers Meigs upon his commissioning as a First Lieutenant in the Corps of Engineers, U.S. Army.

Meigs' first assignment after entering military service was as Assistant Engineer working to improve the western and southwestern defenses of Baltimore, Maryland; Harpers Ferry, West Virginia; and Cumberland, Maryland. His efforts begin on June 15, 1863. During this time, Meigs often operated in active theaters of war. Secretary of War Edwin M. Stanton called his service improving these defenses "meritorious and dangerous".

During General Robert E. Lee's retreat from the Battle of Gettysburg (July 4 to July 23), Meigs assisted in keeping the telegraph and roads open along the Baltimore and Ohio Railroad (B&O) line between Washington and Harpers Ferry. His small unit of engineers skirmished with pickets of Lee's retreating forces near Harpers Ferry about July 13.

On July 23, 1863, Meigs was assigned as an engineer to the staff of Brigadier General Benjamin Franklin Kelley. He was also assigned as an engineer and acting aide-de-camp on the staff of Brigadier General (Volunteers) William W. Averell. He engaged in extensive surveying of the area and drew hundreds of topographical maps, and assisted in designing and overseeing the construction of defensive works. He also reconnoitered on behalf of General Averell's troops on several occasions. He participated in the Battle of Rocky Gap on August 26 to 27, 1863. Meigs was made Chief Engineer of the Shenandoah Valley for the Department of West Virginia (a Union military district) on November 3, staying in the position until August 17, 1864. On November 6, he participated in the Battle of Droop Mountain in West Virginia, and the pursuit of Confederate forces after the battle from November 6 to 18. Meigs was detached from Kelley's command on November 23.

Meigs continued to participate in military action as part of Averell's command. Averell determined to break the supply line from Virginia to Tennessee, which kept General James Longstreet's Army of Tennessee supplied. From December 8 to December 25, Meigs traveled with Averell's troops through bitter cold and snow over the mountains of West Virginia to strike at the Virginia and Tennessee Railroad line at Salem, Virginia. The "Salem Raid" culminated with a daylight dash into Salem on December 16. Reconnoitering with a small unit of engineers, Meigs ordered the first shots fired in the raid. Averell's troops destroyed 16 miles (26 km) of track before rushing back to their base. Although the raid itself did little to disrupt Longstreet's supply lines, several cavalry corps of the Army of Northern Virginia fruitlessly searched for Averell's command for three months.

=== The Lynchburg campaign ===
At the start of campaigning in the spring of 1864, Lieutenant General Ulysses S. Grant was named commander of all Union armies. Grant resolved to strike at the Confederacy on multiple fronts, including a major attack from West Virginia southwest through the Shenandoah Valley. Scorched earth tactics would deny the Confederacy use of this vital agricultural center. Major General Franz Sigel appointed him chief engineer and topographer of the Army of the Shenandoah. Sigel opened the Valley Campaigns of 1864 by taking the Army of the Shenandoah to destroy the railroad center at Lynchburg, Virginia. On May 15, 1864, Meigs was involved in combat at the Battle of New Market. But Sigel was defeated at Newmarket, and retreated to Strasburg, Virginia.

Sigel was replaced as commander by Brigadier General (Volunteers) David Hunter, who resumed the offensive and pushed toward Staunton, Virginia. Hunter retained Meigs as chief engineer and topographer. Meigs helped repair the bridge over Passage Creek (burned during Sigel's retreat) on May 15, which had temporarily stalled Hunter's advance. On May 28, Hunter discovered that Confederate troops had fallen some 6 to 15 miles (9.7 to 24.1 km) back, and he was unopposed along his front. Without Hunter's approval, Meigs led a scouting party which returned that night confirming the lack of opposition. Meigs also informed him that he had burned the home of a Virginian who had helped capture or kill some of Sigel's retreating troops two weeks earlier, and discussed a rumor that Southern women had armed themselves to fight for the Confederacy.

As Hunter prepared to attack the village of Piedmont, Virginia, on June 5, Meigs suggested that cavalry be sent in a feint to take Mount Crawford overlooking the town. Sources differ as to whether he rode with or without orders, but Meigs accompanied the cavalry to show them the way. Lieutenant Colonel John Platner's 1st Regiment of New York Volunteer Veteran Cavalry briefly skirmished with the defenders on Mount Crawford. The feint worked as nervous Confederates held off their attack and gave Hunter time to attack. But Meigs' ride with the cavalry proved a problem as well. Hunter planned an early attack on the town as a means of keeping the Confederates off-balance. But the Confederates had burned the bridge over the South Fork of the Shenandoah River. Hunter ordered a pontoon bridge constructed. But hours passed, and no bridge was built. Hunter was angered when he realized that Meigs, the responsible officer, was off with the cavalry. It is unclear whether Meigs rushed back to his unit and quickly constructed the bridge or whether Hunter oversaw its construction himself. At any rate, the bridge was poorly constructed, and only a small number of troops could cross it at once. The delay cost the Army of the Shenandoah three critical hours and ruined its planned early-hours attack.

Meigs fought in the Battle of Piedmont on June 5, although his combat role is not clear. It is known that he reconnoitered the battlefield during the day, and was the one to inform Hunter that a gap in the center of the Confederate lines had only partially been filled by the 60th Virginia Infantry. Hunter quickly took advantage of the gap, and ordered Colonel Joseph Thoburn's 2nd Brigade into the gap. Meigs rode back and forth along the line of the 2nd Brigade, urging the men to attack as fiercely as possible. The Army of the Shenandoah won the day.

Meigs remained with the troops (but did not fight) when they successfully seized the city of Staunton, Virginia, on June 6. When Union soldiers set fire to several houses in the city, the conflagration threatened to engulf the town. Meigs oversaw an effort to tear down a carriage house to prevent the blaze from spreading.

On June 12, Hunter's forces shelled and burned the Virginia Military Institute (VMI). Meigs retrieved some mathematical instruments from the classrooms. VMI was the home of a life-size bronze statue of George Washington by the noted sculptor Jean-Antoine Houdon. Hunter ordered it removed and sent to West Virginia as a war trophy. Meigs argued that it should go to West Point, but it was shipped to West Virginia. (The statue was damaged when removed from its pedestal).

Hunter pressed on to Lynchburg. His army was delayed again in its crossing of the Big Otter River on June 16, as Meigs struggled for two hours to build yet another pontoon bridge. Riding with the General William Henry Powell's 1st and 2nd West Virginia Cavalry on June 17, Meigs was involved in combat at Diamond Hill at the Battle of Lynchburg (June 17–18).

But the Union army was repulsed at Lynchburg. The late afternoon of June 17, Hunter's forces began retreating. At about 3:00 A.M., they reached the Big Otter River. Hunter had ordered the pontoon bridge destroyed so that Confederate forces could not attack him from the rear. But now, needing another bridge built, Meigs could not be found. With the entire Army of the Shenandoah imperiled by Meigs' absence, Hunter fired him as engineer and appointed Captain Frank Martindale of the First New York Cavalry as engineer in his place. His supply lines long and under attack and supporting armies stymied in their attempt to reach him, Hunter retreated back to West Virginia. In his after-action reports, Hunter had nothing but scorn for Meigs. Meigs learned of his replacement only when Powell's cavalry rejoined the Army of the Shenandoah about June 20.

Meigs remained with the Army of the Shenandoah into August 1864. Hunter was removed as commander of the army on July 3, and Brigadier General Philip Sheridan appointed its commander.

=== The Valley campaign ===
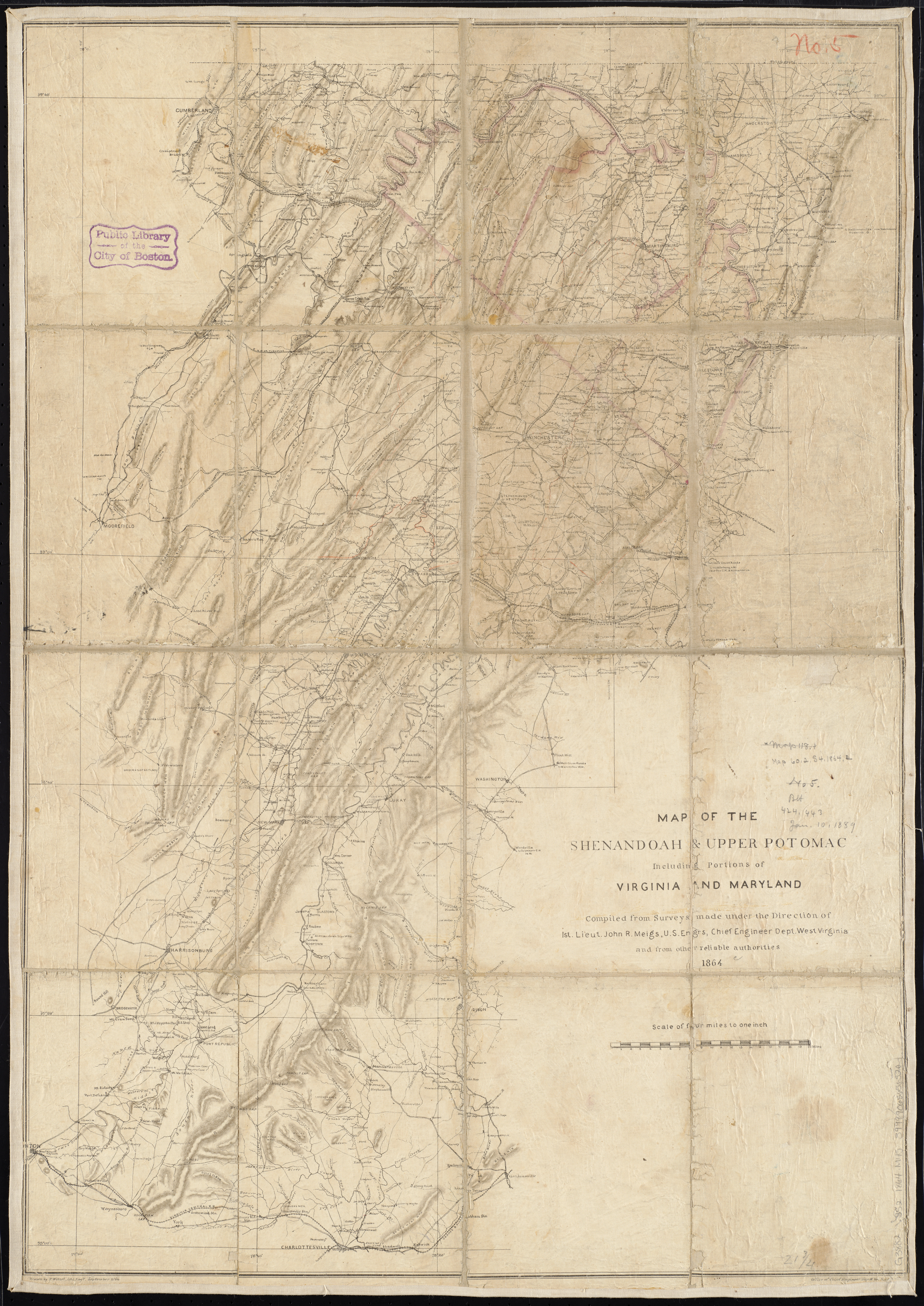
Map of the Shenandoah Valley drawn by John Rodgers Meigs.

Sheridan believed that understanding the topography of the Shenandoah Valley would give him a strategic and tactical advantage. By the summer of 1864, Meigs was recognized as one of the best mapmakers in the Union Army. At his base in Harpers Ferry, West Virginia, he spent hours being tutored by Meigs on the layout of the valley. From Meigs, Sheridan learned that the long ridges in the Shenandoah were not the great protective barriers Union commanders had assumed. The ridges had a number of gaps. Confederate forces could ride north and south, screened by the ridges, and then turn through the gaps to initiate flank attacks on Union forces. Sheridan resolved to protect his flanks from these attacks, and take advantage of the gaps himself.

Meigs quickly became one of Sheridan's favorite officers. On August 17, John Rodgers Meigs was appointed Chief Engineer of the Middle Military Division and aide-de-camp to General Sheridan.

After Hunter's retreat from the Shenandoah, Confederate Lieutenant General Jubal Early rushed north with his Army of the Valley up the Shenandoah, invaded Maryland, and threatened Washington, D.C. Sheridan was determined to wipe out Early's forces, but he needed to move cautiously so that no major defeat would occur that might imperil the re-election of President Abraham Lincoln in November. What is known as the Valley Campaign opened on August 16 in the Battle of Guard Hill, when Union forces surprised Confederate cavalry riding to reinforce Early in Maryland. Early won the initial skirmishes, but Sheridan's forces began pushing south down the Shenandoah Valley again. Early dispersed his forces to continue raiding the B&O Railroad, hoping Sheridan would follow. But Sheridan instead struck at Winchester, Virginia. In the Battle of Opequon on September 19, 1864, Meigs was again in combat. The battle was a decisive victory for the Army of the Shenandoah, and Early took ruinous casualties. Sheridan promoted Meigs to brevet Captain the following day for his battlefield valor. (Note: Beginning with the War of 1812 and continuing through the end of the Civil War, the U.S. armed forces did not awards medals or citation for military valor or bravery. Instead, temporary battlefield promotions, known as "brevet" promotions, were used to recognize these actions.)

Sheridan pressed his advantage against Early immediately. On September 21, he initiated a flank attack against Early's Army of the Valley at Fisher's Hill near Strasburg, Virginia. In the Battle of Fisher's Hill (September 21–22), Meigs again saw combat. Sheridan promoted him to brevet Major on September 22.

=== Death ===
October 3, 1864, was a rainy day. Meigs and two assistants spent the day mapping the area around Harrisonburg, Virginia, plotting routes for the movement of Sheridan's troops. As Meigs and his assistants rode at dusk along the old Swift Run Gap Road, which intersected Warm Springs Turnpike between Harrisonburg and Dayton, Virginia, (where Sheridan's headquarters were), they encountered three men in blue. Believing the men to be Union troops, Meigs rode into their midst. The men turned out to be Confederate scouts attached to a cavalry brigade commanded by Brigadier General Williams Carter Wickham. Although it is unclear who recognized who first, or who fired first, within moments Meigs lay dead, one assistant had been captured, and the other escaped. Meigs' assistant raced back to Sheridan's headquarters, where he told the general that Meigs had been killed—shot in the back—while crying "Don't shoot me!"

Initially, many in the Confederacy argued that neither Meigs nor the Confederates recognized one another. Both groups were wearing rain ponchos which covered their uniforms and made it difficult to see to which army each belongs. According to this account, each group demanded that the other surrender and each group fired.

About 1914, the papers of one of the Confederate scouts, Frank Shaver, were published. In his papers, Shaver corroborated the second Union topographer's account, including the charge that Meigs fired first. He claimed Meigs was given fair warning that they were Confederates, but charged at them. He also said that he shot Meigs in the head, while Private F.M. Campbell shot Meigs in the chest.

== Legacy ==
=== Burning of Dayton ===
It is unclear if the Union topographer's account was accurate or not. Noting that the Confederates were more than 1.5 miles (2.4 km) behind Union lines, Sheridan was convinced that the scouts were actually spies visiting their homes by pretending to be Union soldiers. He ordered that Dayton and every house within 5 miles (8.0 km) of town be burned to the ground. Realizing whom his men had killed, Wickham released his prisoner and sent him back to Sheridan in the hopes of telling a more accurate version of the story. This second assistant told Sheridan that the Confederates pulled their guns first, and captured Meigs and his men. With his cape concealing his movements, Meigs then pulled his pistol out and shot Private George Martin in the groin. The uninjured Confederates then shot Meigs.

Sheridan's men began to burn Dayton. Local townspeople pleaded for them to stop, and Union soldiers often helped them carry belongings out of the house before setting fire to it. Sheridan then ordered the burning of Dayton stopped. His motive is unclear, although both citizens of the town and his own subordinates asked him to rescind the order. Instead, Sheridan ordered that homes and barns around the area where Meigs died be burned, and all able-bodied men in the area were arrested as prisoners of war.

Brigadier General Montgomery C. Meigs was devastated by his son's death. Believing John's death to be murder, he offered a $1,000 reward to anyone who would apprehend George Martin (whom he believed to be the real killer). For many years, Martin lived in hiding for fear of the Meigs' bounty.

=== Burial ===
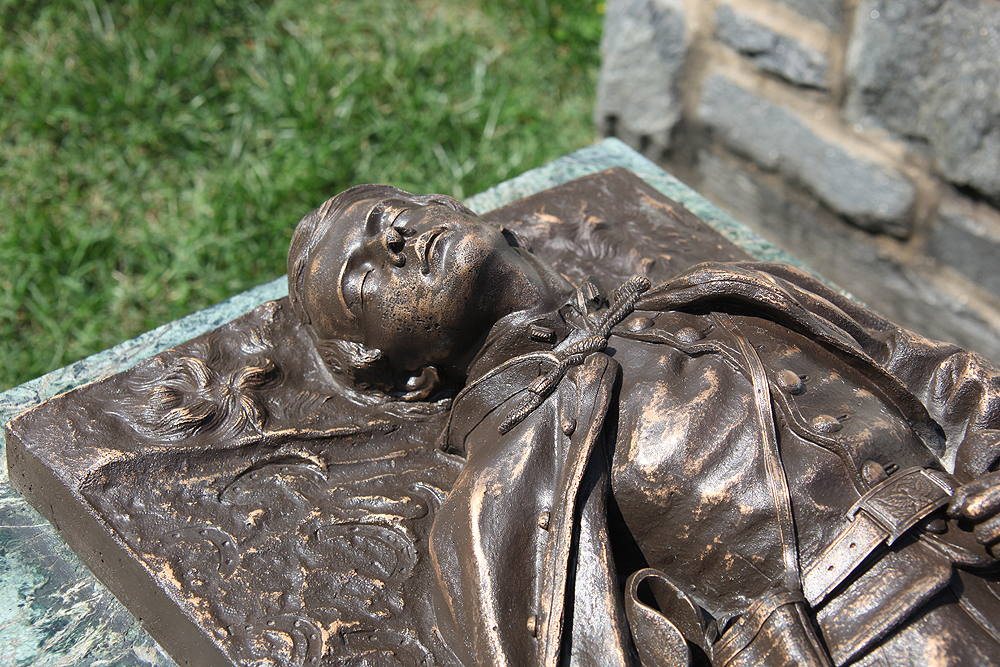
Detail of the cover of the tomb of John Rodgers Meigs at Arlington National Cemetery.

Although the death of John Rodgers Meigs was similar to that of thousands of others who died during the Civil War, his death received national wide attention because of his father's status as Quartermaster General of the United States Army.

John Rodgers Meigs was originally buried at Oak Hill Cemetery in Washington, D.C. President Abraham Lincoln, Secretary of State William H. Seward, Secretary of War Edwin M. Stanton, Army Chief-of-Staff Major General Henry Halleck, and numerous other dignitaries attended his funeral. Stanton eulogized him as "One of the youngest and brightest of the military profession, he has fallen an early victim to murderous rebel warfare".

Montgomery Meigs later had his son's body moved to Arlington National Cemetery, where it rests in a tomb next to his own and many others of the Meigs family. John Rodgers Meigs' tomb is covered by a distinctive bronze gisant by Theophilus Fisk Mills. The high relief sculpture depicts a two-thirds life-size John Rodgers Meigs, in his first lieutenant's engineer uniform, lying on his back in the mud. The hooves of the Confederate cavalrymen have trampled on the body and left imprints in the mud.

A marble column at West Point, erected in the memory of all graduates who fought for the Union cause, also bears his name.

A book of Meigs' letters were published in 2006 under the title A Civil War Soldier of Christ and Country: The Selected Correspondence of John Rodgers Meigs, 1859-64.
