= Mary Meigs Atwater =

American weaver (1878–1956)

- Born: February 28, 1878; Rock Island, Illinois
- Died: September 5, 1956 (aged 78); Salt Lake City, Utah
- Known for: Textile art

Mary Meigs Atwater (February 28, 1878 – September 5, 1956) was an American weaver. She revived handweaving in America by collecting weaving drafts, teaching and writing; Handweaver and Craftsman called Atwater "the grand dame and grand mother of the revival of handweaving in [the United States]".

== Biography ==
Atwater née Meigs was born on February 28, 1878, in Rock Island, Illinois. She attended Miss Wheeler’s Academy in Providence, Rhode Island and went on to study art at the Chicago Art Institute and in Paris, France. In 1902, while in Paris, she met the American mining engineer Maxwell Atwater. She married him in 1903 and the couple had three children, two of whom survived infancy. They settled in Telluride, Colorado and until Maxwell's death in 1919 the couple lived a peripatetic life, residing in several western states, Bolivia and Mexico. When living in Basin, Montana, she began weaving as an artistic outlet and to provide business opportunities for the women in her community. While in Montana, Atwater was involved in the suffrage movement and supported Jeannette Rankin's successful run for office.

After women won the right to vote in Montana, Atwater turned her attention to weaving. She created the Shuttle-Craft Guild and Weaving Shop around 1916. In 1918 Atwater was teaching weaving as occupational therapy to returning World War I veterans in San Francisco, California. In 1919 Maxwell died, and around this time she created the Shuttle-Craft Guild Correspondence Course. She left children with her in-laws and returned to occupational therapy until she settled in Seattle with her children.

In 1928 she published The Shuttle-Craft Book of American Hand-Weaving (Macmillan, 1928). In the early 1930s, during the Great Depression she self published the Mary Meigs Atwater Recipe Book Patterns for Handweavers. This book contained traditional patterns for weaving to be used by craftspeople. During these years Atwater was also publishing the Shuttle-Craft Guild Bulletin.

By 1946 Atwater sold her Shuttle-Craft Guild company and moved to Utah to be near her son. Atwater died on September 5, 1956, in Salt Lake City, Utah.

== Atwater's place in 20th Century weaving ==
The artistic endeavor of handweaving nearly disappeared in America, except for Weaver Rose (William Henry Harrison Rose) and his sister Elsie Maria Babcock Rose in Rhode Island and isolated women in the Appalachian Mountains. Atwater researched patterns and collected forgotten weaves and through her efforts restored weaving in America as an artistic endeavor. As she states in The Shuttle-Craft Book of American Hand-Weaving, "There are actually more hand-looms in operation at the present time than there were at the time of the Revolution when all textiles were woven by hand."

"The 20th-century revival of American hand-weaving began with a few individuals who rediscovered the old coverlets and the surviving weavers. These interested individuals saw a need to collect the woven pieces and knowledge still around before the coverlets were permanently destroyed and the information lost. They recorded or acquired coverlets and coverlet fragments, as well as written drafts, notebooks, and account books. Founding weaving schools and donating collections to museums, these individuals including Mary Meigs Atwater, left a legacy to today's weavers, historians and collectors."

In 1983 Ed Rossbach wrote about Atwater for American Craft magazine.

In an essay for the book Crafting Modernism, curator Elissa Auther discusses Atwater's contribution to the American handweavers movement. Atwater precedes the notable weavers of the 1940s and 1950s (Anni Albers, Ruth Asawa, and Dorothy Liebes). Atwater was more interested in preserving the tradition of handweaving and employing the craft for pleasure and therapy. She did have contact with Albers and the two debated the value of handweaving as an art.

Atwater is credited with bringing Summer & Winter tied unit weave to a 20th century audience, including modern weavers. The patterns had fallen out of use in the mid-1850s.

== See also ==
- Montgomery Atwater (son)
- James E. Atwater (grandson)
