= Moloch in literature and popular culture =

References to the Canaanite god Moloch in literature, arts and entertainment

The Biblical term Moloch has traditionally been understood as a Canaanite god to whom child sacrifice was offered. In post-classical rabbinical tradition, this supposed deity was associated with Greco-Roman reports of Carthaginian child sacrifice to the god Baal Hammon. In later Christian tradition, Moloch was often described as a demon. Moloch is depicted in John Milton's epic poem Paradise Lost as one of the greatest warriors of the rebel angels, vengeful and militant.

In the 19th century, "Moloch" came to be used allegorically for any idol or cause requiring excessive sacrifice. Bertrand Russell in 1903 used Moloch to describe oppressive religion, and Winston Churchill in his 1948 history The Gathering Storm used "Moloch" as a metaphor for Adolf Hitler's cult of personality.

== Allegorical ==
Part II of Allen Ginsberg's 1955 poem "Howl", "Moloch", is about the state of industrial civilization. Moloch is the name of an industrial, demonic figure in Fritz Lang's Metropolis, which Ginsberg credited with influencing "Howl, Part II".

Moloch (Молох) is a 1999 Russian biographical drama film directed by Alexander Sokurov. It portrays Adolf Hitler living life in an unassuming manner during an abrupt journey to the Bavarian Alps.

Moloch, an 1906 opera by Max von Schillings, is about a priest, seeking to teach those oppressed by the Romanas, who becomes frustrated and commits suicide.

== Eponymy and other references ==
Eponym: One who gives, or is supposed to give, his name to a people, place, or institution (OED)

=== Literature ===
- Gustave Flaubert's Salammbô (1862), a semi-historical novel about Carthage, depicts the practice of child sacrifice to Moloch.
- In the dystopian novel The Secret of the League (1907) by Ernest Bramah, Moloch is the name of a prototype flying-machine that goes off course and is eventually lost.
- In Isaac Asimov's short story "The Dead Past" (1956), the plot hinges on a historian's obsession with exonerating the Carthaginians of their supposed child sacrifice to Moloch.
- In Robert A. Heinlein's novel Job: A Comedy of Justice (1984), the main characters join a church pastored by "Reverend Dr. M. O. Loch."
- In Walter Moers's The 131/2 Lives of Captain Bluebear (1999), the great ship is called the Moloch. It appears as a soulless object of machinery, a gigantic floating city that exerts great attraction but from which no one returns.
- Moloch is one of the names given to Corky Laputa in Dean Koontz's novel The Face (2003).
- Moloch played an important role in Jeff Lindsay's novel Dexter in the Dark (2007).
- Moloch is a character in the Felix Castor novels written by Mike Carey (2007 and following).
- In Derek Landy's Skulduggery Pleasant (2007), Moloch is the name of a vampire living in Ballymun.
- In Wayne Barlowe's novel God's Demon (2007), Moloch appears as an infernal general to the ruling demonic legions, ruling under Beelzebub. His relationship with Hannibal particularly focuses on his demands for child sacrifice from his followers.
- In Dan Brown's novel The Lost Symbol (2009), the principal villain's backstory reveals that he renamed himself Mal'akh after the angel Moloch in Paradise Lost. The villain also performs a black magic ritual to allow the angel to descend and possess him, as he gains extra powers after the ritual is complete.
- In Ilona Andrews' novella "Blood Heir" (2021), Moloch is the principle antagonist.
- In Patrick Rothfuss' children's book "The Princess and Mr. Wiffle", Moloch is the proposed name for a kitten which is subsequently and symbolically eaten by the Princess.
- In the Slate Star Codex popular post "Meditations on Moloch", Scott Alexander takes inspiration from the Moloch introduced in Allen Ginsberg's "Howl", and tags Moloch as the name for abstract, systemic, failures of coordination.

=== Comics and anime ===
- Alan Moore's Watchmen features a retired underworld crime boss who once adopted the name Moloch the Mystic (real name Edgar William Jacobi) and wore the robes of a magician.
- Moloch von Zinzer is a supporting character in the webcomic Girl Genius.
- The cartoonist Paul Mavrides depicts a serious/comical Moloch in Anarchy Comics #1, in a piece entitled "Some Straight Talk about ANARCHY".
- In Marvel Comics, Moloch was the antagonist of Marvel Fanfare #52, in which a cult of "hill-people" attempt to sacrifice the Black Knight to him.
- Also from Marvel, Molek was the name of an Arabic spirit of vengeance in Jason Aaron's run on Ghost Rider.
- In Yondemasu yo, Azazel-san, Moloch is the demon of violence, and is implied to be the strongest demon summoned; however, in all of his incarnations, he is exorcized or killed before he can display any of his power. His appearance is that of a bull plushy.
- In "The Chapel of Moloch", Hellboy travels to Tavira, Portugal, to investigate a centuries-old chapel reputedly devoted to the worship of Moloch. In the Hellboy universe, Moloch is also portrayed as a bull-headed creature.
- In the anime/manga Dragon Ball Super, the main villain of the Galactic Patrol Prisoner Saga, named Moro, is depicted as a goat-like, humanoid creature, similar to the Canaanite god Moloch.

=== Film and TV ===
- In Giovanni Pastrone's silent epic film Cabiria (1914), substantially based on Flaubert, the heroine is saved from being sacrificed to the idol Molech.
- In Fritz Lang's silent film Metropolis (1927), Moloch is a vision of a demonic machine. His face overlays machinery, and the hero, Freder, has a vision of workers being dragged by chains into the fires inside Moloch's mouth.
- "Moloch", an episode of the BBC television series Blake's 7 (1980).
- Moloch is a character in Stargate SG-1 who demands all female children be burnt alive at birth. He is killed by a missile strike in the episode "Sacrifices", written by Stargate actor Christopher Judge .
- Moloch the Corrupter is the name of a demon in the Buffy the Vampire Slayer episode "I, Robot... You, Jane" (1997). In this adaptation, Moloch is portrayed as a powerful demon who charms his victims with false promises of power and glory if they devote their love to him.
- Moloch is the entity after Alfie's soul in Indonesian films May the Devil Take You and May the Devil Take You Too
- In the Korean reality game show Agents of Mystery (2024), the evil cult attempts to resurrect Molek in a ritual.
- In the Inside No. 9 episode "The Harrowing", the surnames of Hector, Tabitha, and Andras is Moloch. Andras himself is possessed by a demon.

=== Video games ===
- Moloch is an archdevil in the Dungeons & Dragons role-playing game.
- In Total War: Warhammer III, the Chaos Dwarfs worship a minor chaos god called Hashut. This god is commonly depicted as a golden bull. Hashut constantly demands slaves and sacrifices to be appeased.
- Moloch is an Oni demon in the Mortal Kombat franchise who was first introduced as a sub-boss in Deadly Alliance (2002).
- Moloch regularly appears in the Megami Tensei series, first introduced in Digital Devil Story: Megami Tensei II.
- In the series Golden Sun, Moloch is the name of a summon the player can use to damage enemies with the help of tiny elemental creatures called Djinn. Moloch's design is inspired by the legend of the Yeti.
- Appears as one of the gods players can pray to in 2023's Total War: Pharaoh. Moloch gives players large combat bonuses for devoted generals.
