= Kai Lung Raises His Voice =

2010 collection of fantasy stories by Ernest Bramah

- Cover of the first edition
- Author: Ernest Bramah
- Cover artist: Jin Liying (1772–1807)
- Language: English
- Series: Kai Lung
- Genre: Fantasy
- Publisher: Durrant Publishing
- Publication date: 2010
- Publication place: United Kingdom
- Media type: Print (paperback), ebook (Kindle/Mobipocket, ePub)
- Pages: x, 225
- ISBN: 978-1-905946-10-5
- Preceded by: Kai Lung: Six

Kai Lung Raises His voice is a collection of fantasy stories by English writer Ernest Bramah featuring Kai Lung, an itinerant story-teller of ancient China. It was first published in 2010 in paperback and ebook in the United Kingdom by Durrant Publishing, and is available world-wide.

The collection gathers into book form the final six Kai Lung stories published by the author during his lifetime, which originally appeared in the magazine Punch and first appeared in book form in Kai Lung: Six, together with the one Kai Lung story from The Specimen Case and four previously unpublished stories, originally written before 1905, transcribed from the Bramah archives at the Harry Ransom Center by William Charlton.

== Contents ==
- "Preface" (by William Charlton)
- "The Subtlety of Kang Chieng" (previously unpublished)
- "Ming Tseuen and the Emergency"
- "Lam-Hoo and the Reward of Merit"
- "Chung Pun and the Miraculous Peacocks"
- "Yeun Yang and the Empty Lo-Chee Crate"
- "Sing Tsung and the Exponent of Dark Magic"
- "Kwey Chao and the Grateful Song Bird"
- "Li Pao, Lucky Star and the Intruding Stranger"
- "The Cupidity of Ah Pak or Riches No Protection Against Thunderbolts" (previously unpublished)
- "The Romance of Kwang the Fruit Gatherer" (previously unpublished)
- "The Destiny of Cheng, the Son of Sha-kien of the Waste Expanses" (previously unpublished)

The ebook contains one additional story, an alternative version of "The Romance of Kwang the Fruit Gatherer":

- "The Emperor Who Meant Well" (previously unpublished)

== Reviews ==
- Reviewed in The Tablet, 2 September 2010, by Anthony Lejeune.
