= Grant Richards (publisher) =

British publisher & writer (1872–1948)

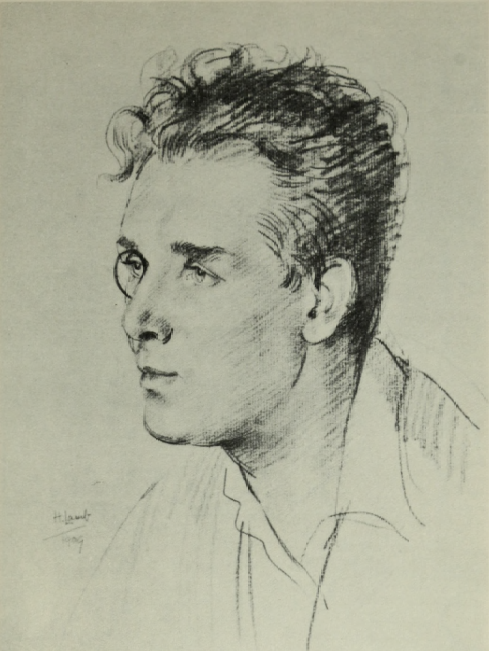
- Grant Richards (1872-1948), British publisher and writer, in 1909. From a pencil drawing by Henry Lamb.
- Born: Franklin Thomas Grant Richards; 21 October 1872; Hillhead, Partick, Lanarkshire
- Died: 24 February 1948 (aged 75); Monte Carlo, Monaco
- Occupations: Publisher, writer
- Known for: Founder of Grant Richards and The World's Classics

Franklin Thomas Grant Richards (21 October 1872 – 24 February 1948) was a British publisher and writer. After creating his own publishing firm at the age of 24, he launched The World's Classics series (still published by Oxford University Press as Oxford World's Classics) and published writers such as George Bernard Shaw, A. E. Housman, Samuel Butler, Frederick Rolfe and James Joyce. He made "a significant impact on the publishing business of the early twentieth century". Theodore Dreiser immortalized him under the name 'Barfleur' so as to shield his privacy in his non-fiction book, "A Traveler at Forty."

== Early life and career ==
He was born Franklin Thomas Grant Richards in University Hall, Hillhead, Partick, Lanarkshire on 21 October 1872. His father was Franklin Thomas Richards, a fellow and tutor of Trinity College, Oxford. From 1880, he attended school first at Langdale House, Oxford and later he attended the City of London School.

Richards was close to Grant Allen, an uncle who was a Canadian science writer and novelist. Allen recognized his nephew's interest in books and publishing and it was thanks to Allen's recommendation that in 1888 Richards obtained his first job as a junior clerk at the wholesale booksellers, Hamilton, Adams and Company. Allen also helped obtain a position with W. T. Stead, the publishers of Review of Reviews where for six years Richards would be employed as an editor and reviewer.

== Career as a publisher ==
In 1897, Richards launched his first eponymous publishing house based at 9 Henrietta Street in Covent Garden, London. He published several books by Grant Allen, including titles in the Grant Allen’s Historical Guides series and The Evolution of the Idea of God: An Inquiry into the Origins of Religion.

In 1897, Richards began publishing Dumpy Books for Children, a series of small, pocket books for children. With their tiny size, charming stories and poems and coloured illustrations, the series was an instant success. "[T]he success of the Dumpy format encouraged other publishers to release small children’s books" (for example, in 1902 Frederick Warne issued Beatrix Potter's series with a similar success). In 1907 Richards would publish the animal fable, The Cock, the Mouse and the Little Red Hen, for a similar audience and with similar success and it remains in print to this day.

In 1898, he published books by major authors including the collection Plays: Pleasant and Unpleasant by George Bernard Shaw and a new edition of A Shropshire Lad by A. E. Housman. In 1900 he published G. K. Chesterton's first book, The Wild Knight and Other Poems, Saki's The Rise of the Russian Empire and Ernest Bramah's The Wallet of Kai Lung. In 1901 he published Fame and Fiction: An Enquiry into Certain Popularities by Arnold Bennett. In 1901 and 1903 he issued Erewhon Revisited and The Way of All Flesh by Samuel Butler.

In 1901, Richards published Frederick Rolfe's first book, Chronicles of the House of Borgia. The difficult relationship between the author and publisher is dealt with in detail in A.J.A. Symons' biography of Rolfe, The Quest for Corvo.

In 1901, he launched The World's Classics series of reprints of literary classics. While the titles in this series were mostly public domain books, Richards aimed to distinguish his series from those of his competitors by publishing well produced books at an affordable price.

Unfortunately, when the series experienced a great success with the reading public, the undercapitalized firm went into heavy debt to meet the unexpected demand. This, along with firm's move to larger premises at 48 Leicester Square, led to bankruptcy and liquidation of the business in 1905. Henry Frowde, the manager of the Oxford University Press, purchased the series which continues to be published as Oxford World's Classics.

Richards moved to smaller premises in 7 Carlton Street and established a new publishing firm under the name E. Grant Richards (the first initial being added from his wife's name, Elisina). In 1908, he moved premises once again—to 8 St. Martin's Street—and began trading as Grant Richards Ltd. In this period, he published A Commentary (1908) by John Galsworthy, Spain, a Study of Her Life and Arts by Royall Tyler (1909), Dubliners (1914) and Exiles: A Play in Three Acts (1918) by James Joyce, The Ragged-Trousered Philanthropists (1914) by Robert Tressell, and several works by John Masefield. He published Love's Wild Geese (1924) and several other books by Jack Kahane, who would later establish the Parisian Obelisk Press in 1929.

In 1926, Richards' firm became bankrupt once more. He thenceforth published under the name of the Richards Press and also Grant Richards Fronto Limited.

== Career as a writer ==
Richards was the author of nine novels, beginning with the first three, Caviare (1912), Valentine (1913) and Bittersweet (1915). These three novels have been said to "capture the essence of romance – seeking love, fine food, fine wine and Paris". Richards's final novel was published in 1935. Some of Richards' novels were published by Richards's own firm and others were published by major publishers such as Jonathan Cape, William Heinemann and Cassell.

Richards also published two autobiographies—Memories of a Misspent Youth (1932) and its sequel, Author Hunting by An Old Literary Sportsman (1934)—in which "much valuable information about the literary world of the period is recorded".

== Personal life ==
Richards married twice. In 1898 he married Elisina Palamidessi de Castelvecchio (later known as Elisina Tyler, 1878–1959), the great-granddaughter of Napoleon’s brother Louis. The couple had four children:

- Gioia Vivian Mary Elisina Grant Richards Owtram;
- Gerard Franklin Richards;
- Charles Geoffrey ("Carlos") Richards; and
- Geoffrey Herbert Richards.

Their marriage ended in divorce in 1914.

On 2 July 1915, he married Maria Magdalena de Csanády (later known as Marie Madeleine Agnes Richards, born 1889/90).

Richards died at 3 avenue des Citronniers, Monte Carlo, Monaco on 24 February 1948. His final address in Britain was given in the probate documents as "46 Buckingham-court, London S.W.1".

== Posthumous reputation ==
In its obituary for Grant Richards, The Times praised him as "an adventurous publisher" who had "published some of the best books of his time ... in spite of two rather devastating bankruptcies". It observed that "he had a very real feeling for literature which the reader of his own novels would scarcely suspect". He was also remembered for "his very real instinct for friendship, his unruffled amiability, his handsome attire, and [his] monocle".

== Book series published by Grant Richards ==
- The Dumpy Books for Children
- Grant Allen's Historical Guides
- The Omar Series
- Smaller Classics Series
- The World's Classics

For full list click here

== Books written by Grant Richards ==
- Caviare, London: Grant Richards Ltd., 1912.
- Valentine, London: Grant Richards Ltd., 1913.
- Bittersweet, London: Grant Richards Ltd., 1915.
- Double Life: A Novel, London: Grant Richards Ltd., 1920.
- Every Wife: An Amusement, London: Grant Richards Ltd., 1924.
- Fair Exchange, London: Heinemann, 1927.
- The Coast of Pleasure : Chapters Practical, Geographical and Anecdotal on the Social, Open-air and Restaurant Life of the French Riviera, with a few Notes on the Ways of Approach to that Resort of Worldlings, London: Jonathan Cape, 1928. Illustrations by Tom Van Oss.
- The Hasty Marriage, London: Jonathan Cape, 1928.
- Vain Pursuit, London: Grant Richards, 1931.
- Memories of a Misspent Youth, 1872-1896, London: Heinemann, 1932. Introduction by Max Beerbohm.
- Author Hunting, by an Old Literary Sportsman; Memories of Years Spent Mainly in Publishing, 1897-1925, London: Hamish Hamilton, 1934.
- The Amiable Charles, London: Cassell and Company Limited, 1935.
- Housman, 1897–1936, Oxford: Oxford University Press and London: Humphrey Milford, 1941. With an Introduction by Mrs. E. W. Symons and Appendices by G. B. A. Fletcher and Others.
