= Dumpy =

Dumpy may refer to:

- Dumpy level, an optical instrument used in surveying and building to transfer, measure, or set horizontal levels
- Dumpy's Rusty Nuts, a British rock band founded by Graham "Dumpy" Dunnell
- Scots Dumpy, a breed of chicken from Scotland
- Dumpy books, a series of small-format books published in Britain by Grant Richards between 1897 and 1904
- Dumpy tree frog, a common name for Australian Green Tree Frog
