= Kai Lung =

Fictional character in a series of books by Ernest Bramah

Kai Lung is a fictional character in a series of books by Ernest Bramah, consisting of The Wallet of Kai Lung (1900), Kai Lung's Golden Hours (1922), Kai Lung Unrolls His Mat (1928), The Moon of Much Gladness (1932; published in the US as The Return of Kai Lung), Kai Lung Beneath the Mulberry Tree (1940), Kai Lung: Six (1974) and Kai Lung Raises His Voice (2010).

== Overview ==
Kai Lung is a Chinese storyteller whose travels and exploits serve mainly as excuses to introduce substories, which generally take up the majority of a Kai Lung book. He is a man of very simple motivations; most frequently, he is animated by a desire for enough taels to be able to feed and clothe himself. Otherwise, his main motivation is love for his wife, Hwa-mei, and he seeks nothing more than a simple, sustainable lifestyle. Generally, he does not intrude in other people's affairs unless he thinks it necessary to teach them the rudiments of classical proportion with one of his fables.

He usually comes into conflict with barbarians, bandits, and other people who are not classically educated, as well as various unscrupulous individuals who are intent on taking away his property.

== References by other writers ==
In Thorne Smith's comedic fantasy The Stray Lamb, the character Mr. Lamb relaxes while reading Kai Lung.

Dorothy L. Sayers mentions Kai Lung and/or quotes from the books in several Lord Peter Wimsey novels, specifically Strong Poison, Gaudy Night and Busman's Honeymoon

In "'He Cometh and He Passeth By!'" by H. Russell Wakefield, one of the principal characters reads The Wallet of Kai-Lung before retiring to bed.

Ford Madox Ford repeatedly quoted the allegedly Chinese proverb "It would be hypocrisy to seek for the person of the Sacred Emperor in a Low Tea House." It has been convincingly argued that Ford originally acquired this proverb from the Kai Lung novels of Ernest Bramah, and that Bramah had created it for Kai Lung, rather than quoting a genuine Chinese proverb.

Irene the Librarian quotes Kai Lung in Genevieve Cogman’s novel “The Secret Chapter”.
