= The Wallet of Kai Lung =

1900 collection of fantasy stories by Ernest Bramah

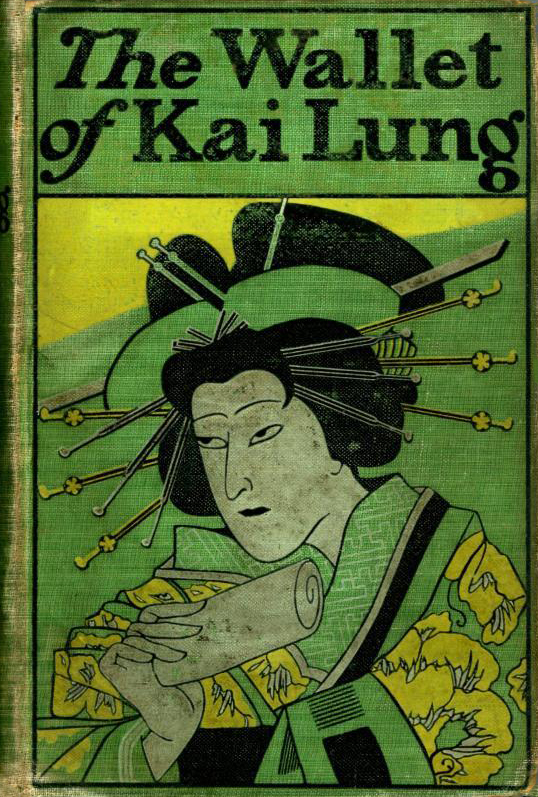
- Dust-jacket from the first edition
- Author: Ernest Bramah
- Language: English
- Series: Kai Lung
- Genre: Fantasy
- Publisher: Grant Richards
- Publication date: 1900
- Publication place: United Kingdom
- Media type: Print (hardback)
- Pages: 337
- Followed by: Kai Lung's Golden Hours

The Wallet of Kai Lung is a collection of fantasy stories by English writer Ernest Bramah, all but the last of which feature Kai Lung, an itinerant story-teller of ancient China. It was first published in hardcover in London by Grant Richards in 1900, and there have been numerous editions since. Its initial tale, "The Transmutation of Ling", was also issued by the same publisher as a separate chapbook in 1911. The collection's importance in the history of fantasy literature was recognized by the anthologization of two of its tales in the celebrated Ballantine Adult Fantasy Series, edited by Lin Carter and published by Ballantine Books; "The Vision of Yin" in Discoveries in Fantasy (March, 1972), and "The Transmutation of Ling" in Great Short Novels of Adult Fantasy Volume II (March, 1973).

Although the collection is presented in the fashion of a novel, with each of its component stories designated chapters, there is no overall plot aside from each of the first eight tales being presented as narratives told by Kai Lung at various points in his itinerant career. The final tale is represented as being from a manuscript left by its own separate first-person narrator, Kin Yen.

== Contents ==
1. "The Transmutation of Ling"
2. "The Story of Yung Chang"
3. "The Probation of Sen Heng"
4. "The Experiment of the Mandarin Chan Hung"
5. "The Confession of Kai Lung"
6. "The Vengeance of Tung Fel"
7. "The Career of the Charitable Quen-Ki-Tong"
  "First Period: The Public Official"
  "Second Period: The Temple Builder"
8. "The Vision of Yin, the Son of Yat Huang"
9. "The Ill-Regulated Destiny of Kin Yen, the Picture Maker"

== Copyright ==
The copyright for this story has expired in the United States, and thus now resides in the public domain. The text is available via Project Gutenberg.
