= Sambo (racial term) =

Ethnic slur for someone of African ancestry

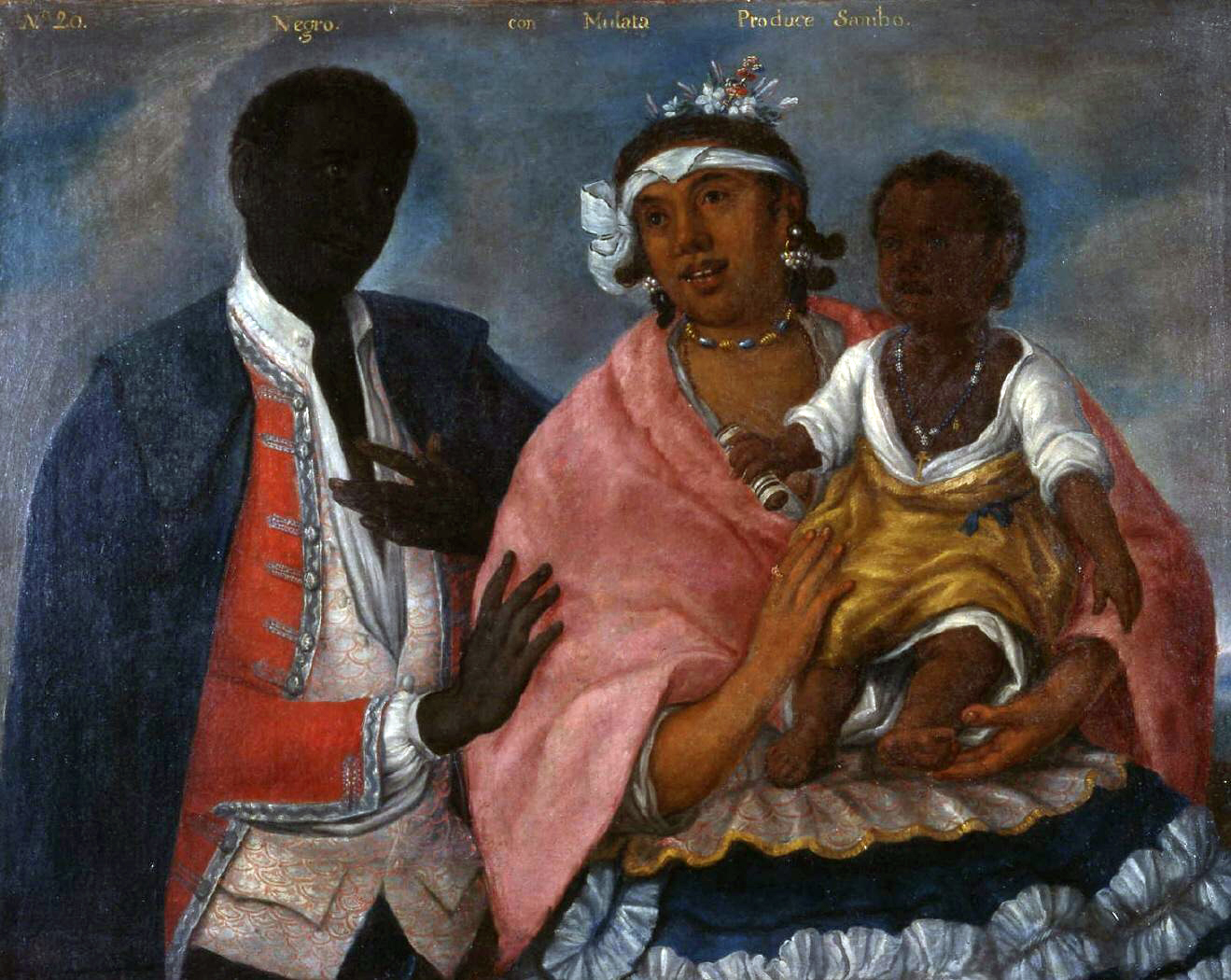
The painting Negro con Mulata produce Zambo ('a negro man with a mulatto woman makes a zambo'), Cristóbal Lozano, c. 1771–1776

Sambo is a derogatory label for a person of Black-African descent in the Spanish language. Historically, it is a name in American English derived from a Spanish term for a person of three quarters African and one quarter European ancestry typically the offspring of a Black person and a Mulatto. After the Civil War, during and after the Jim Crow era the term was used in conversation, print advertising and household items as a pejorative descriptor for Black people of Black African descent. The term is considered offensive in American and British English.

== Etymology ==
Sambo came into the English language from zambo, the Spanish word in Latin America for a person of South American negro, mixed European, and native descent. This in turn may have come from one of three African language sources. Webster's Third International Dictionary holds that it may have come from the Kongo word nzambu ('monkey'). The Royal Spanish Academy gives the origin from a Latin word, possibly the adjective valgus or another modern Spanish term (patizambo), both of which translate to 'bow-legged'.

The equivalent term in Brazil is cafuzo. However, in Portugal and Portuguese-speaking Africa, cafuzo is used to refer to someone born of an African person and a person of mixed African and European ancestry.

Another possibility is that Sambo may be a corruption of the name Samba (meaning "second son" in the Fula language, an ethnicity spread throughout West Africa). Michael A. Gomez has argued that Sambo is actually an Islamic name and that men named Sambo in the South were likely to have been slaves who practiced Islam.

== Literature ==
Examples of Sambo as a common name can be found as far back as the 19th century. In Vanity Fair (serialised from 1847) by William M. Thackeray, the black-skinned Indian servant of the Sedley family from Chapter One is called Sambo. Similarly, in Uncle Tom's Cabin (1852) by Harriet Beecher Stowe, one of Simon Legree's overseers is named Sambo. Instances of it being used as a stereotypical name for African Americans can be found as early as the Civil War.

The name Sambo became especially associated with the children's book The Story of Little Black Sambo by Helen Bannerman, published in 1899. It was the story of a southern Indian boy named "Sambo" who outwitted a group of hungry tigers. Bannerman also wrote Little Black Mingo, Little Black Quasha, and Little Black Quibba.

== Places ==
=== Sambo's Grave ===
Sambo's Grave is the 1736 burial site of a young Indian cabin boy or slave, on unconsecrated ground in a field near the small village of Sunderland Point, near Heysham and Overton, Lancashire, England. Sunderland Point used to be a port, serving cotton, sugar and slave ships from the West Indies and North America.

=== Sambo's restaurant chain ===
The once-popular Sambo's restaurant chain used the Helen Bannerman images to promote and decorate their restaurants, although the restaurants were originally claimed to have been named after the chain's co-owners, Samuel Battistone and Newell Bohnett.

== See also ==
- Afro-Latin Americans
- Casta
- Dinah
- Race and ethnicity in Latin America
- The Peculiar Institution

== Bibliography ==
- Boskin, Joseph (1986) Sambo: The Rise and Demise of an American Jester, New York: Oxford University Press
- Goings, Kenneth (1994) Mammy and Uncle Mose: Black Collectibles and American Stereotyping, Bloomington: Indiana University Press, ISBN 0-253-32592-7
