= The Story of Little Black Sambo =

1899 children's book by Helen Bannerman

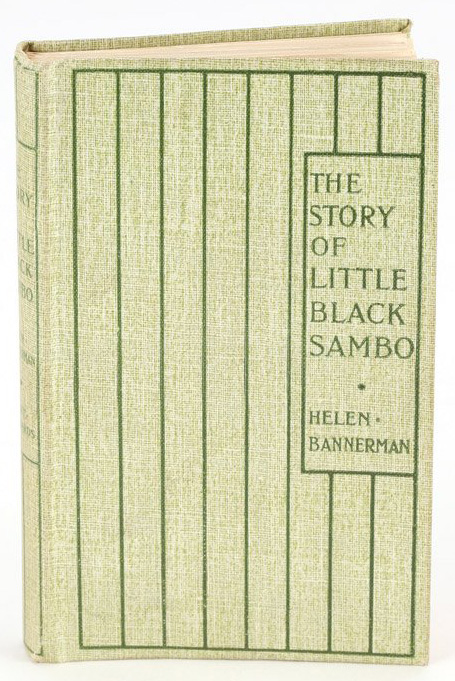
- 1st edition cover, 1899
- Author: Helen Bannerman
- Illustrator: Helen Bannerman
- Language: English
- Genre: Children's literature
- Publisher: Grant Richards, London
- Publication date: 1899
- Publication place: United Kingdom
- Media type: Print

The Story of Little Black Sambo is a children's book written and illustrated by Scottish author Helen Bannerman and published by Grant Richards in October 1899. As one in a series of small-format books called The Dumpy Books for Children, the story was popular for more than half a century. It was later published in Britain by Chatto & Windus.

Contemporary critics observed that Bannerman presented one of the first black heroes in children's literature and regarded the book as positively portraying black characters in both the text and pictures, especially in comparison to books of that era that depicted black people as simple and uncivilised. However, the name "Sambo" has since been considered offensive in American and British English. Bannerman's book became an object of allegations of racism in the mid-20th century due to the names of the characters being racial slurs for dark-skinned people, and the fact that the illustrations were, as Langston Hughes expressed it, in the pickaninny style. In more recent editions, both text and illustrations have undergone considerable revision.

== Plot ==
Sambo is a South Indian boy who lives with his father and mother, named Black Jumbo and Black Mumbo respectively. While out walking, Sambo encounters four hungry tigers, and he surrenders his colourful new clothes, shoes and umbrella so that they will not eat him. The tigers are vain and each thinks that it is better dressed than the others. They have a big argument and chase each other around a tree until they are reduced to a pool of ghee (clarified butter). Sambo recovers his clothes and goes home, and his father later collects the ghee, which his mother uses to make pancakes.

== Controversy ==
The book's original illustrations were created by the author and were simple in style, and depicted Sambo as a Southern Indian or Tamil child. Little Black Sambo's success led to many counterfeit, inexpensive, easily available versions that incorporated popular stereotypes of "black" peoples. One example was a 1908 edition illustrated by John R. Neill, best known for his illustration of the Oz books by L. Frank Baum. In 1932, Langston Hughes criticised Little Black Sambo as a typical "pickaninny" storybook which was hurtful to black children, and gradually the book disappeared from lists of recommended stories for children.

Cover of 1900 first U.S. edition published by Frederick A. Stokes

In 1942, Saalfield Publishing Company released a version of Little Black Sambo illustrated by Ethel Hays. In 1943, Julian Wehr created an animated version. During the mid-20th century, some American editions of the story, including a 1950 audio version on Peter Pan Records, changed the title to the racially neutral Little Brave Sambo.

The book is beloved in Japan and is not widely considered controversial there. Little Black Sambo (ちびくろサンボ, Chibikuro Sanbo) was first published in Japan by Iwanami Shoten Publishing in 1953. The book was an unlicensed version of the original, and it contained drawings by Frank Dobias that had appeared in a U.S. edition published by Macmillan Publishers in 1927. Sambo was illustrated as an African boy rather than an Indian boy. Although it did not contain Bannerman's original illustrations, this book was long mistaken for the original version in Japan. It sold over 1,000,000 copies before it was removed from shelves in 1988, when The Association to Stop Racism Against Blacks launched a complaint against all major publishers in Japan that published variations of the story, which, in turn, triggered self-censorship among those publishers. In 2005, after copyright of the 1953 Iwanami Shoten Publishing edition of the book expired, Zuiunsya reprinted the original version and sold more than 150,000 copies within five months' time, and Kodansha and Shogakukan, the two largest publishers in Japan, published official editions. These are still in print, and as of August 2011, an equally controversial "side story" for Little Black Sambo, called Ufu and Mufu, is being sold and merchandised in Japan. The reprinting caused criticism from media outside Japan, such as the Los Angeles Times.

== Modern versions ==
In 1959, Whitman Publishing Company released an edition illustrated by Violet LaMont. Her colorful pictures show an Indian family wearing bright Indian clothes. The story of the boy and the tigers is as described in the plot section above.

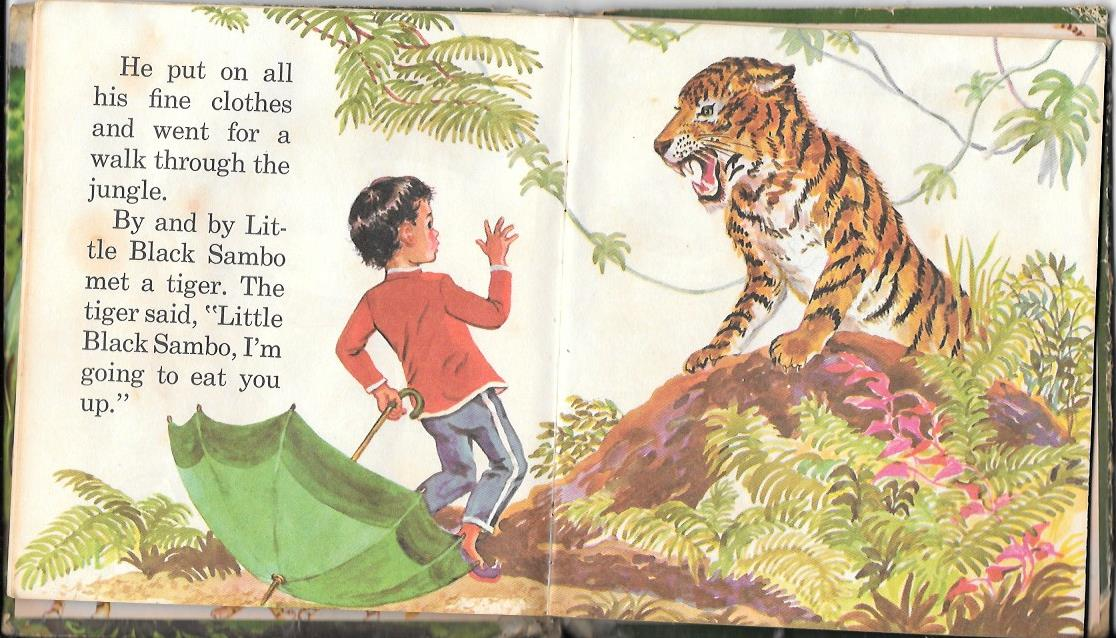
A page from the 1959 edition of Little Black Sambo

In 1996, illustrator Fred Marcellino considered that the story itself contained no racist overtones and produced a re-illustrated version, The Story of Little Babaji, which changed the characters' names but otherwise left the text unmodified.

Julius Lester, in his Sam and the Tigers, also published in 1996, recast "Sam" as the African American hero of the mythical Sam-sam-sa-mara, where all the human inhabitants are named "Sam".

A 2003 printing with the original title substituted more racially sensitive illustrations by Christopher Bing, portraying Sambo, in his publisher's words, as "a glorious and unabashedly African child". It was chosen for the Kirkus 2003 Editor's Choice list. Some critics remained unsatisfied. Alvin F. Poussaint said of the 2003 publication: "I don't see how I can get past the title and what it means. It would be like ... trying to do 'Little Black Darky' and saying, 'As long as I fix up the character so he doesn't look like a darky on the plantation, it's OK.'"

In 1997, Kitaooji Shobo Publishing in Kyoto obtained formal license from the UK publisher, and republished the work under the title of Chibikuro Sampo (In Japanese, "Chibi" means "little,""kuro" means black, and "Sampo" means a stroll, a kind of pun for the original word "Sambo"). The protagonist is depicted as a black Labrador puppy that goes for a stroll in the jungle; no humans appear in the edition. The Association To Stop Racism Against Blacks still refers to the book in this edition as discriminatory.

Bannerman's original was first published with a translation of Masahisa Nadamoto by Komichi Shobo Publishing, Tokyo, in 1999.

In 2004, a Little Golden Books edition was published under the title The Boy and the Tigers, with new names and illustrations by Valeria Petrone. The boy is called Little Rajani.

Because Iwanami's copyright expired fifty years after its first appearance, the Iwanami version, with its controversial Dobias illustrations and without the proper copyright, was re-released in April 2005 in Japan by a Tokyo-based publisher Zuiunsya.

In 2017 the Cajun version of this old story was published under the name of "The Story of Tee-Blanc Sambeaux as Told by Auntie Amíe"

== Adaptations ==
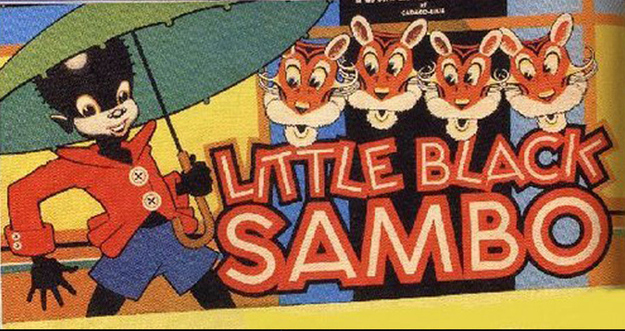
Little Black Sambo board game (box lid)

A board game was produced in 1924, and re-issued in 1945, with different artwork. Essentially, the game followed the storyline, starting and ending at home.

In the 1930s, Wyandotte Toys used a pickaninny caricature "Sambo" image for a dart-gun target.

An animated version of the story was produced in 1935 as part of Ub Iwerks's ComiColor series.

In 1939, Little Nipper (RCA Records for children) issued, in addition to a record storybook set of the traditional story, a two 45-RPM record storybook set entitled "Little Black Sambo's Jungle Band", narrated by Paul Wing. In the story, Little Black Sambo (in India) goes for a walk in the jungle and encounters a variety of animals, each, in the style of Peter and the Wolf (which had been composed by Sergei Prokofiev three years before), with its own distinctive instrument (e.g., an elephant with a tuba, a "big baboon with a big bassoon", a honey bear with a "perfectly peach piccolo", and a long green snake "playing its scales"). Each animal plays a distinctive song for him, and then they elect him to be their band director. By trial and error, Sambo trains the animals to play and harmonize together. In short, he is the talented hero of the story.

Columbia Records issued a 1946 version on two 78 RPM records with narration by Don Lyon. It was issued in a folder with artwork showing Sambo to be quite black indeed, though the narrative preserves the locale as India.

In 1961, the His Master's Voice Junior Record Club issued a dramatised version – words by David Croft, music by Cyril Ornadel – with Susan Hampshire in the title role and narrated by Ray Ellington.

== Referenced or parodied in ==
The visual novel Danganronpa: Trigger Happy Havoc (as well as its anime adaptation) references The Story of Little Black Sambo in the second chapter of the story. When Mondo Owada is found guilty of murdering a fellow student, the headmaster of the academy executes him in the "Motorcycle Death Cage". Owada is tied to the back of a motorcycle and sent to spin in circles in a large steel cage; spinning at this fast rate while the cage becomes charged with electricity causes Mondo to be electrocuted to a point of liquefying into a butter-like substance that is packaged as "Mondo Butter". "Little Black Sambo" (痴美苦露惨母) is seen written in kanji on the back of the motorcycle at the beginning of the execution, and the tiger design on the motorcycle and the two bobbing tiger panels on the sides of the death cage are a clear reference to this story.

The novel Fahrenheit 451 by Ray Bradbury references Little Black Sambo in Part One: The Hearth and the Salamander as Captain Beatty discusses literature with Guy Montag: "Colored people don't like Little Black Sambo. Burn it. White people don't feel good about Uncle Tom's Cabin. Burn it."

"Begin the Begin", the opening song on R.E.M.'s 1986 album Lifes Rich Pageant, references the story with the lyrics "tiger run around the tree, follow the leader, run and turn into butter."

The novel Butter by Asako Yuzuki makes frequent references to The Story of Little Babaji.

== Restaurants ==
Lil' Sambo's was a restaurant founded in 1957 in Lincoln City, Oregon named after the fictional character. It operated for 65 years as a popular spot in the community with many novelty merchandise items for sale. It closed in 2022 with the aging of the owners.

Sambo's was a popular U.S. restaurant chain of the 1950s through 1970s that borrowed characters from the book (including Sambo and the tigers) for promotional purposes, although the Sambo name was originally a blend of the founders' names and nicknames: Sam (Sam Battistone) and Bo (Newell Bohnett). For a period in the late 1970s, some locations were renamed "The Jolly Tiger". The controversy about the book led to accusations of racism that contributed to its demise in the early 1980s. Images inspired by the book (now considered by some to be racially insensitive) were common interior decorations in the restaurants. Though portions of the original chain were renamed "No Place Like Sam's" to try to forestall closure, all but the original restaurant in Santa Barbara, California had closed by 1983. The original location, owned by Battistone's grandson Chad Stevens, existed in Santa Barbara under the name "Sambo's" until June 2020. The name on the restaurant's sign was temporarily changed to the motto "☮ & LOVE" due to pressure from the Black Lives Matter group during the George Floyd protests and a separate signature drive that collected thousands of signatures. In July 2020, the restaurant was officially renamed "Chad's".

== See also ==
- Ethnic issues in Japan
- Jynx
- Lists of banned books
- Murzynek Bambo –- Little Black Bambo by Polish writer Julian Tuwim
- Zambo, a term used in the Spanish colonial caste system to denote a person with both African and Amerindian ancestry
