= Huamei =

Huamei may refer to:

- Li hing mui (話梅 huàméi), pickled ume
- Chinese hwamei (畫眉 huàméi), a songbird of China
- A character in Kai Lung Unrolls His Mat
- Hua Mei (giant panda) (华美 huáměi), a giant panda in the San Diego Zoo
