= The Cock, the Mouse and the Little Red Hen =

Modern fable

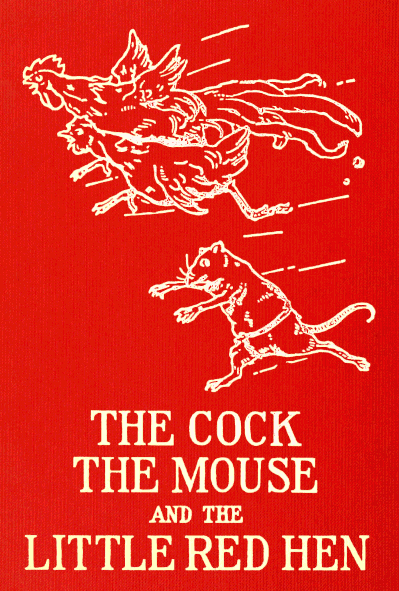
1907 book cover of fable retold by Félicité Lefèvre & illustrated by Tony Sarg

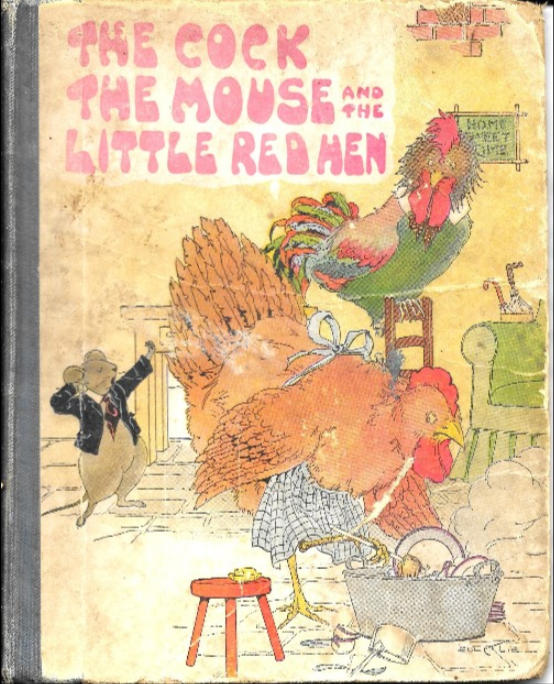
1925 book cover of fable retold by Watty Piper & illustrated by Eulalie Minfred Banks

The Cock, the Mouse and the Little Red Hen is a European fable first collected by Félicité Lefèvre and published in illustrated form by Grant Richards in 1907. The story is a variation of the fable, the Little Red Hen and has been further adapted to the modern fable, the Fox and the Little Red Hen.

== The plot ==
On two hills are two houses. One house is well kept where the cock, mouse and red hen live. The other house is ramshackle where the bad fox and little foxes live. The little foxes are hungry so the greedy fox decides to catch the cock, the mouse and the hen for their supper. At the well kept house, the cock and the mouse show their nature of laziness by refusing to help with breakfast chores. The hard working red hen does all the chores cheerfully.

The mouse and the cock sleep while the fox approaches the house and they carelessly let the fox in. All are captured and popped into a sack and carried off. The fox tires and lays down to rest. The red hen effects the escape from the sack by using her sewing utensils and substituting stones for themselves. After the three run away home, fox awakes, picks up the sack of stones, and falls into the stream, and is never seen again. As a reward, the hen enjoys a break while cock and mouse do all the chores, thankful to be alive.

== The moral lesson ==
The central moral lesson of the fable is that "hard work pays", in that the laziness of the cock & mouse lead to the capture of the animals by the fox and the assiduous hen then works hard to get them free again.

The secondary moral lesson is to "be prepared for every eventuality" whereby the red hen kept a sewing kit on her person just in case it was ever needed and this saved their lives.

== Background and adaptations ==
=== Retelling ===
As with such old tales, these were retold orally over time and naturally varied. In recent history, the tale has been re-told through different publications with variations in the storyline appearing: -

- 1907; - retold by Félicité Lefèvre, published by E Grant Richards
- 1925; - retold by Watty Piper, published by Platt & Munk
- 1931; - retold by Peat Fern Bisel, published by Saalfield
- 1960; - retold by Helen Adler, published by Rand McNally
- 1982; - retold by Lorinda Bryan Cauley, published by Putnam Juvenile
- 1992; - retold by Graham Percy, published by Candlewick

=== The little red hen ===
The tale is related to the Little Red Hen, as both stories have a red hen representing an assiduous nature and other animals representing a slothful nature, with a central moral lesson of both stories being that "hard work pays". Where they differ is in their secondary moral lessons. The Little Red Hen shows that if you don't help someone, you can’t expect to reap the resulting benefits, whereas the cock, the mouse and the little red hen promotes being prepared for every eventuality as an important maxim of the story. The two fables are likely to have had a common ancestor story which diverged into the two tales sometime in the historical past.

=== The fox and the little red hen ===
The significant modern adaptation of this fable has been its simplification for younger readers with the name simply referring to the fox and the hen. Here the other animals are dropped and the core story focuses on the red hen escaping from the fox because of having the sewing kit on her person. In these variants, the assiduous nature of the little red hen is not bought out instead the moral is on her being prepared for every eventuality. The simplified tale for children learning to read has been published many times, a list of early publications is shown below: -

- 1957; - Lazy Fox and Red Hen - no author credited published by western publishing company under a Whitman book
- 1931; - The Little Red Hen and the Fox - Fairy Tales From the World Over retold by Georgene Faulkner, published by Grosset & Dunlap, New York
- 1968; - The Sly Fox and the Little Red Hen - retold by Vera Southgate, published by Ladybird Books
- 1969; - Lazy Fox and Red Hen (tell-a-tale) - retold by Jane Dwyer, published by Whitman
- 1999; - The Sly Fox and Little Red Hen - retold by Jenny Giles, published by Cengage Learning New Zealand
- 1999; - The Sly Fox and Little Red Hen - retold by Mandy Ross, published by Penguin Books
- 2009; - The Fox and the Little Red Hen - retold by Brenda Parkes, published by ThriftBooks, Dallas

The ladybird series, "read it yourself" also has had several re-tellers, including: - Diana Mayo, Fran Hunia and Susan Ullstein
