= Kai Lung: Six =

1974 collection of fantasy stories by Ernest Bramah

- First edition
- Author: Ernest Bramah
- Language: English
- Series: Kai Lung
- Genre: Fantasy
- Publisher: The Non-Profit Press
- Publication date: 1974
- Publication place: United States
- Media type: Print (hardback)
- Pages: xii, 58
- Preceded by: Kai Lung Beneath the Mulberry Tree
- Followed by: Kai Lung Raises His Voice

Kai Lung: Six is a collection of fantasy stories by English writer Ernest Bramah featuring Kai Lung, an itinerant story-teller of ancient China. It was first published as a limited edition of 250 copies in hardcover in Tacoma, Washington by The Non-Profit Press in 1974.

The collection gathers into book form for the first time the final six Kai Lung stories published by the author during his lifetime, all of which originally appeared in the magazine Punch. It appeared thirty-four years after the previous Kai Lung collection. It was subsequently superseded by Kai Lung Raises His Voice (2010), a more comprehensive collection including both its stories and a number of previously unpublished ones.

The title of the collection reflects the fact that it is both the sixth book in the Kai Lung series and contains six stories. It also includes an introduction by William White.

== Contents ==
- "Introduction" (by William White)
- "The Story of Lam-Hoo and the Reward of Merit"
- "The Story of Chung Pun and the Miraculous Peacocks"
- "The Story of Yeun Yang and the Empty Soo-Shong Chest"
- "The Story of Sing Tsung and the Exponent of Dark Magic"
- "The Story Kwey Chao and the Grateful Song Bird"
- "The Story Li Pao, Lucky Star and the Intruding Stranger"
