= Kai Lung's Golden Hours =

1922 novel by Ernest Bramah

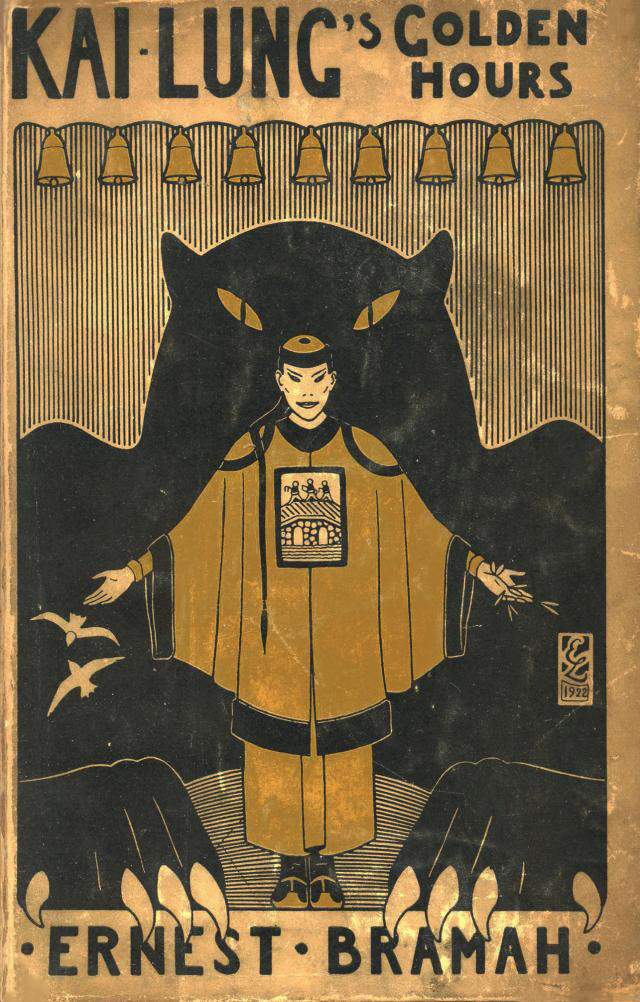
- Dust-jacket from the first edition
- Author: Ernest Bramah
- Language: English
- Series: Kai Lung
- Genre: Fantasy
- Publisher: Grant Richards Ltd.
- Publication date: 1922
- Publication place: United Kingdom
- Media type: Print (Hardback)
- Pages: vii, 312
- Preceded by: The Wallet of Kai Lung
- Followed by: Kai Lung Unrolls His Mat

Kai Lung's Golden Hours is a fantasy novel by English writer Ernest Bramah. It was first published in hardcover in London by Grant Richards Ltd. in October, 1922, and there have been numerous editions since. The first edition included a preface by Hilaire Belloc, which has also been a feature of every edition since. It was reissued by Ballantine Books as the forty-fifth volume of the Ballantine Adult Fantasy series in April, 1972. The Ballantine edition includes an introduction by Lin Carter.

== Plot introduction ==
As with other Kai Lung novels, the main plot serves primarily as a vehicle for the presentation of the gem-like, aphorism-laden stories told by the protagonist Kai Lung, an itinerant story-teller of ancient China. In Kai Lung's Golden Hours he is brought before the court of the Mandarin Shan Tien on charges of treason by the Mandarin's confidential agent Ming-shu. In a unique defense, Kai Lung recites his beguiling tales to the Mandarin, successfully postponing his conviction time after time until he is finally set free. In the process he attains the love and hand of the maiden Hwa-Mei.

== Contents ==
- "Preface" (Hilaire Belloc)
1. "The Encountering of Six within a Wood"
2. "The Inexorable Justice of the Mandarin Shan Tien"
  "The Story of Wong T'sin and the Willow Plate Embellishment"
3. "The Degraded Persistence of the Effete Ming-shu"
  "The Story of Ning, the Captive God, and the Dreams that mark his Race"
4. "The Inopportune Behaviour of the Covetous Li-loe"
  "The Story of Wong Pao and the Minstrel"
5. "The Timely Intervention of the Mandarin Shan Tien's Lucky Day"
  "The Story of Lao Ting and the Luminous Insect"
6. "The High-minded Strategy of the Amiable Hwa-mei"
  "The Story of Weng Cho; or, the One Devoid of Name"
7. "Not Concerned with any Particular Attribute of Those who are Involved"
  "The Story of Wang Ho and the Burial Robe"
8. "The Timely Disputation among Those of an Inner Chamber of Yu-Ping"
  "The Story of Chang Tao, Melodious Vision and the Dragon"
9. "The Propitious Dissension between Two whose General Attributes have already been sufficiently Described"
  "The Story of Yuen Yan, of the Barber Chou-hu, and His Wife, Tsae-che"
10. "The Incredible Obtuseness of Those who had Opposed the Virtuous Kai Lung"
  "The Story of Hien and the Chief Examiner"
11. "Of Which it is Written: 'In Shallow Water Dragons become the Laughing-stock of Shrimps'"
12. "The Out-passing into a State of Assured Felicity of the Much-Enduring Two With Whom These Printed Leaves Have Chiefly Been Concerned"
  "The Story of the Loyalty of Ten-teh, the Fisherman"

== Copyright ==
The copyright for this story has expired in the United States, and thus now resides in the public domain. The text is available via Project Gutenberg.
