= The Moon of Much Gladness =

1932 novel by Ernest Bramah

- Dust-jacket from the first edition
- Author: Ernest Bramah
- Language: English
- Series: Kai Lung
- Genre: Fantasy
- Publisher: Cassell
- Publication date: 1932
- Publication place: United Kingdom
- Media type: Print (Hardback)
- Pages: 316
- Preceded by: Kai Lung Unrolls His Mat
- Followed by: Kai Lung Beneath the Mulberry Tree

The Moon of Much Gladness is a fantasy novel by English writer Ernest Bramah, told by an unnamed narrator who may be Kai Lung, a fictional itinerant story-teller of ancient China from other books by Bramah. It was first published in hardcover in London by Cassell and Company, Ltd. in May 1932, and was reprinted in 1934. The first American edition was issued by Sheridan House in 1937.

While the fictional narrator of this novel never refers to himself by name, the British first edition is subtitled "A Kai Lung story", and the American edition has the title The Return of Kai Lung.

Unlike the other books by Bramah, it is a true novel rather than a string of short stories. The queue of the mandarin T'sin Wong has mysteriously vanished while he slept. The maiden Hwa-che seeks to solve the mystery, using the methods she has learned from the crime novels of the Western barbarians. In this she is aided by Chin-tung, the mandarin's male secretary. Initially disguised as a man, she and Chin-tung become increasingly attracted to each other as the story progresses.

The story humorously spoofs the conventions of the mystery novel, and contains allusions to well known fictional detectives. Readers will catch allusions to Sherlock Holmes, Lord Peter Wimsey, and Hercule Poirot, among others. As with Bramah's other Chinese stories, much of the humor is also derived from a mock "Chinese" re-phrasing of common English expressions.
