= Max Carrados =

Fictional British detective of the early 20th century; created by Ernest Bramah

- First appearance: The Coin of Dionysius (1914)
- Last appearance: The Bravo of London (1934)
- Created by: Ernest Bramah
- Portrayed by: Alfred Shirley; Robert Stephens; Simon Callow; Charles Edwards; Pip Torrens

In-universe information
- Gender: Male
- Occupation: Detective
- Nationality: English

Max Carrados is a fictional blind detective in a series of mystery stories by Ernest Bramah, first published in 1914.

George Orwell wrote that, together with those of Doyle and R. Austin Freeman, Max Carrados and The Eyes of Max Carrados "are the only detective stories since Poe that are worth re-reading."

== Characters ==
The characters and identities of Max Carrados and his usual accomplice Mr Carlyle are explained in the first story, "The Coin of Dionysius". Mr Carlyle is a private investigator, running a private inquiry agency concerned mainly with divorce and defalcation. He is directed to the home of Wynn Carrados at The Turrets, Richmond, London, for an expert opinion on a tetradrachm of Dionysius the Elder of Sicily which he believes may be a forgery substituted into a famous collection in the course of a theft. At their meeting, the blind Carrados immediately recognises Mr Carlyle (from his voice) as his former schoolfriend (at St Michael's), Louis Calling. Carlyle then recognizes him in turn as Max Wynn ("Winning" Wynn).

Max explains that he was made financially independent by a rich American cousin who left him a fortune won by doctoring his crop reports, on condition that he adopt the surname Carrados. He was blinded some twelve years before the first story, as a result of a minor incident while out horse-riding with a friend. His friend, who was leading, brushed past a twig which flicked back and caught Max in the eye. From this he was blinded by the illness called amaurosis.

Carrados makes use of his remaining senses in such a way that his blindness is often not immediately apparent to others. A wealthy, cultured and urbane man, he is an expert numismatist with a large private collection of bronzes, and is a specialist in forgeries. Carrados can read print by finger-touch, uses a typewriter and smokes the most desirable and unobtainable cigars. He has a trusted (sighted) manservant named Parkinson (who is trained to be highly observant but without placing his own interpretations on what he observes) and also a secretary, Mr Greatorex.

Carlyle was formerly a solicitor, who was struck off for his supposed involvement with the falsifying of a trust account. After this scandal he changed his name and set up the inquiry agency, which is fronted by an ex-Scotland Yard policeman.

Carrados enjoys the éclat of revealing his explanations of mysteries through powers of perception, which ought to be at the disposal of any sighted person, but which in his case are heightened in positive compensation for his visual impairment. The problem of the forged coin (his first 'case'), including the names of the collector, the forger and the thief, and the method, is explained to Carlyle without Carrados ever leaving his study. In subsequent cases, however, Carrados is active, adventurous and even intrepid in tracking down his quarry.

Given the somewhat unusual idea that a blind man could be a detective, Bramah took pains to compare his hero's achievements to those of real life blind people such as Nicholas Saunderson, Lucasian Professor of Mathematics at Cambridge, Blind Jack of Knaresborough the road builder, John Fielding the Bow Street Magistrate, of whom it was said he could identify 3,000 thieves by their voices, and Helen Keller.

== Canon ==
As published in book form, the series comprises:

- Max Carrados (Methuen & Co, London 1914)

- The Coin of Dionysius
- The Knight's Cross Signal Problem
- The Tragedy at Brookbend Cottage
- The Clever Mrs. Straithwaite
- The Last Exploit of Harry the Actor
- The Tilling Shaw Mystery
- The Comedy at Fountain Cottage
- The Game Played in the Dark

- The Eyes of Max Carrados (Grant Richards, London 1923)

- The Virginiola Fraud
- The Disappearance of Marie Severe
- The Secret of Dunstan's Tower
- The Mystery of the Poisoned Dish of Mushrooms
- The Ghost of Massingham Mansions
- The Missing Actress Sensation
- The Ingenious Mr. Spinola
- The Kingsmouth Spy Case
- The Eastern Mystery

- The Specimen Case (Hodder and Stoughton, London 1924)

- The Bunch of Violets

- Max Carrados Mysteries (Hodder and Stoughton, London 1927)

- The Secret of Headlam Height
- The Mystery of the Vanished Petition Crown
- The Holloway Flat Tragedy
- The Curious Circumstances of the Two Left Shoes
- The Ingenious Mind of Mr. Rigby Lacksome
- The Crime at the House in Culver Street
- The Strange Case of Cyril Bycourt
- The Missing Witness Sensation

- The Bravo of London (a novel) (Cassell & Co, London 1934)

A selection of stories from the earlier volumes were later gathered into Best Max Carrados Detective Stories (1972).

== TV and radio adaptations ==
Carrados is portrayed by Robert Stephens in a 50-minute adaptation of "The Missing Witness Sensation," an episode of the 1971 TV series The Rivals of Sherlock Holmes.

In the BBC Radio 4 series Thriller Playhouse, Max Carrados is played by Simon Callow.

Arthur Darvill narrated a series of Max Carrados stories for BBC Radio 4 Extra in 2011.

- The Coin of Dionysius
- The Knight's Cross Signal Problem
- The Tragedy at Brookbend Cottage
- The Last Exploit of Harry the Actor
- A Game Played in the Dark

Max Carrados appeared in three episodes of the BBC Radio 4 series The Rivals: in the Series Two story "The Game Played in the Dark" (where he was played by Charles Edwards), the Series Three story "The Knight's Cross Signal Problem" and the Season Four episode "The Secret of Dunstan's Tower" (in both of which he was played by Pip Torrens).

Max Carrados appeared on American radio in the 1942 series called Murder Clinic from WOR and the Mutual Broadcasting System. A single episode entitled "The Holloway Flat Tragedy" from August 18, 1942, featured British actor Alfred Shirley as the blind detective.

Stephen Fry narrated a series of Max Carrados stories for Audible.

== Bibliography ==
- Greene, Hugh. The Rivals of Sherlock Holmes: Early Detective Stories (1970; Penguin 1971): Introduction.
- Wilson, Aubrey. The Search for Ernest Bramah (Creighton and Read 2007) ISBN 0-9553753-0-4
