= The Bravo of London =

1934 novel

- First edition
- Author: Ernest Bramah
- Language: English
- Series: Max Carrados
- Genre: Thriller
- Publisher: Cassell
- Publication date: 1934
- Publication place: United Kingdom
- Media type: Print
- Preceded by: Max Carrados Mysteries

The Bravo of London is a 1934 mystery thriller novel by the British writer Ernest Bramah. It featured his most celebrated character the blind detective Max Carrados who had first appeared in 1914. It was the first and only full-length novel to feature Carrados, who usually appeared in short stories.

In a later review David Langford described it as "a disappointing performance whose most memorable section turns out to be a recycling of one of the short stories". Another modern commentator observed that only in this novel "did Bramah's invention flag, though Joolby, a criminal antique dealer, makes for a memorable villain".

== Bibliography ==
- Langford, David. Up Through an Empty House of Stars. Wildside Press, 2003.
- Miskimmin, Esme. 100 British Crime Writers. Springer Nature, 2020.
- Reilly, John M. Twentieth Century Crime & Mystery Writers. Springer, 2015.
