= Kai Lung Beneath the Mulberry Tree =

1940 collection of fantasy stories by Ernest Bramah

- First edition dust cover
- Author: Ernest Bramah
- Language: English
- Series: Kai Lung
- Genre: Fantasy
- Publisher: The Richards Press Ltd.
- Publication date: 1940
- Publication place: United Kingdom
- Media type: Print (Hardback)
- Pages: 320
- Preceded by: The Moon of Much Gladness
- Followed by: Kai Lung: Six

Kai Lung Beneath the Mulberry Tree is a collection of fantasy stories by English writer Ernest Bramah featuring Kai Lung, an itinerant story-teller of ancient China. It was first published in hardcover in London by The Richards Press Ltd. in February 1940, and was reprinted in 1942, 1944, 1946, and 1951. The first American edition was issued by Arno Press as a volume in its Lost Race and Adult Fantasy Fiction series in 1978.

The title is from Kai Lung's customary venue for telling his stories, sitting on his mat under a mulberry tree.

Although the collection is presented in the fashion of a novel, with each of its component stories designated chapters, there is no overall plot aside from the tales being presented as narratives told by Kai Lung at various points in his itinerant career.

== Contents ==
1. "The Story of Prince Ying, Virtuous Mei, and the Pursuit of Worthiness"
2. "The Three Recorded Judgments of Prince Ying, from the Inscribed Scroll of Mou Tao, The Beggar"
3. "The Ignoble Alliance of Lin T'sing with the Outlaw Fang Wang, and How It Affected the Destinies"
4. "The Story of Yin Ho, Hoa-mi, and the Magician"
5. "The Story of Ton Hi, Precious Gem and the Incospicuous Elephant"
6. "The Story of Sam-tso, the Family Called Wong, and the Willing Buffalo"
7. "The Story of Saho Chi, the No-longer Merchant Ng Hon, and the Docile Linnets"
8. "The Story of the Poet Lao Ping, Chun Shin's Daughter Fa, and the Fighting Crickets"
