= Jin Liying =

Chinese painter

- 金禮嬴
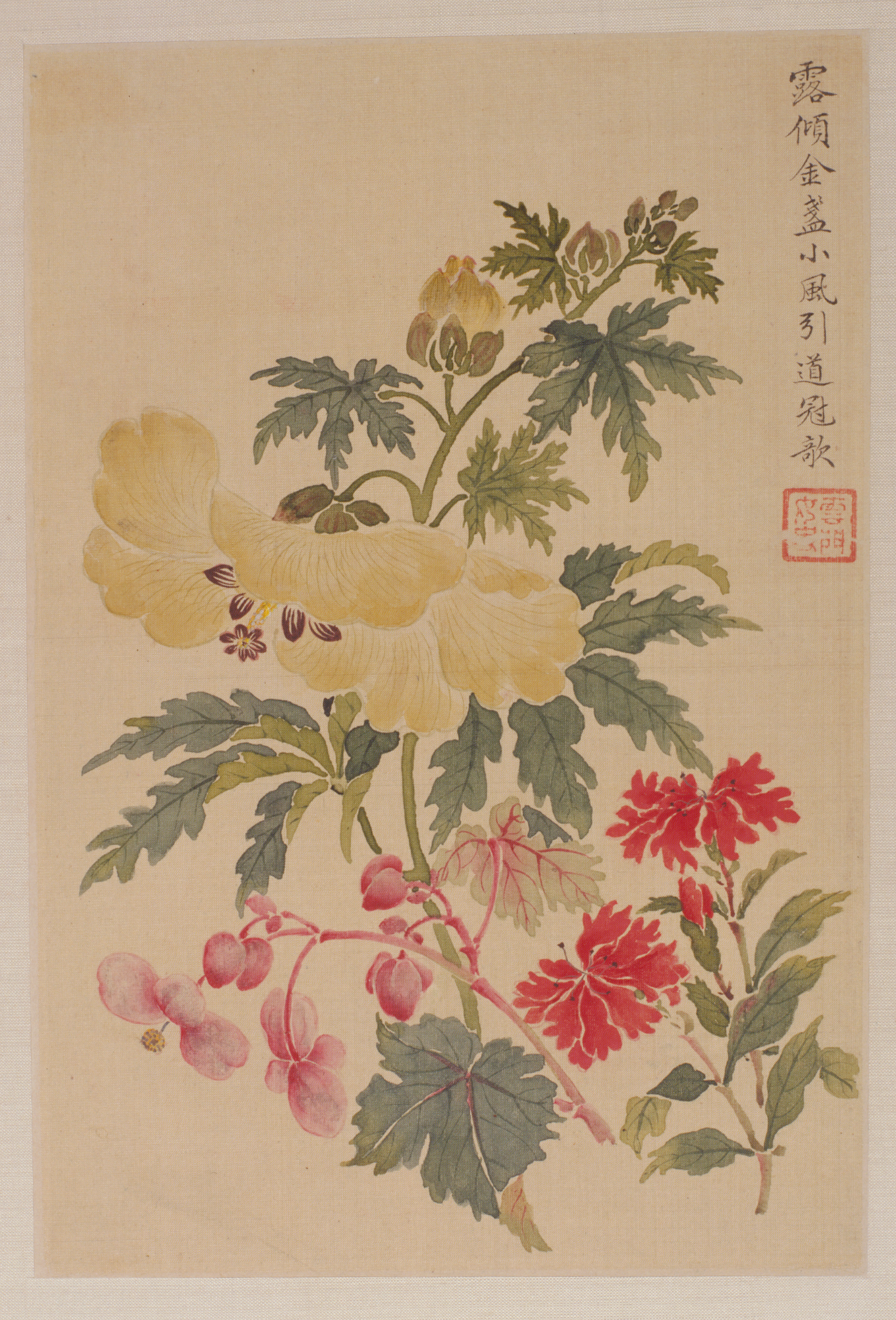
- Born: 1772; Shaoxing
- Died: 1807 (aged 34–35)
- Occupation: Painter, poet
- Spouse(s): Wang Tan

Jin Liying (Chinese: 金禮贏; pinyin: Jīn Lǐyíng; 1772 – 1807) was a Chinese painter. She is regarded as one of the best female painters of the High Qing era.

Jin Liying was born in 1772 in Shanyin, now part of Shaoxing. She was raised in a gentry family in Kuaiji (now also part of Shaoxing) and was taught Confucian and Buddhist classics. At the age of 22, she became the second wife of poet and painter Wang Tan (王曇).

Her paintings depict landscapes, portraits, still lifes, flowers, and Buddhist religious subjects, including dozens of images of Guanyin. A devout Mahāyāna Buddhist, she painted an elaborate hanging scroll of Guanyin in 1803 to commemorate her Bodhisattva vows. She was a successful professional painter and her work was sought after not only in China, but also in Japan and Korea.

Jin Liying died in 1807 at the age of 36.
