= Grant Richards (publishing house) =

British publishing house

- Founded: 1897
- Founder: Franklin Thomas Grant Richards
- Country of origin: United Kingdom
- Headquarters location: London
- Publication types: Books

Grant Richards was a small British publishing house founded in 1897 by the writer Grant Richards.

Significant publications from the company's first incorporation were George Bernard Shaw's Plays Pleasant and Unpleasant and A. E. Housman's A Shropshire Lad, as well as books by G. K. Chesterton, Saki, Arnold Bennett, Samuel Butler, and Ernest Bramah.

In 1897, the Grant Richards publishing house began publishing the Dumpy Books for Children series of small format books for children.

In 1901, the publishing house launched The World's Classics, a reprint series of out of copyright literary classics. In 1905, the series was acquired by Henry Frowde of Oxford University Press, which continues to publish the series as Oxford World's Classics.

Richards declared bankruptcy in 1905. He reorganised and continued to run the firm, publishing first under the name of E. Grant Richards (which included the initial of his wife's first name) and then under the name of Grant Richards Ltd. In these years the firm published works by John Galsworthy, Royall Tyler, James Joyce, Robert Tressell, John Masefield, and Jack Kahane.

In 1926, when Richards declared bankruptcy a second time, the firm was renamed as the Richards Press. In 1937, the firm was bought by Martin Secker. It was subsequently bought by John Baker and finally by A & C Black.

== Book series ==
- The Children's Library
- The Dumpy Books for Children
- Ethics of the Surface Series
- Grant Allen's Historical Guides
- How To series
- The Larger Dumpy Books for Children
- Omar Series
- The Russian Library
- Smaller Classics Series
- The Sylvan Series
- The World's Classics
