= Oxford World's Classics =

Series of classic literature

Three different cover designs of the Oxford World's Classics series. From left to right: 1987, 1998, 2009.

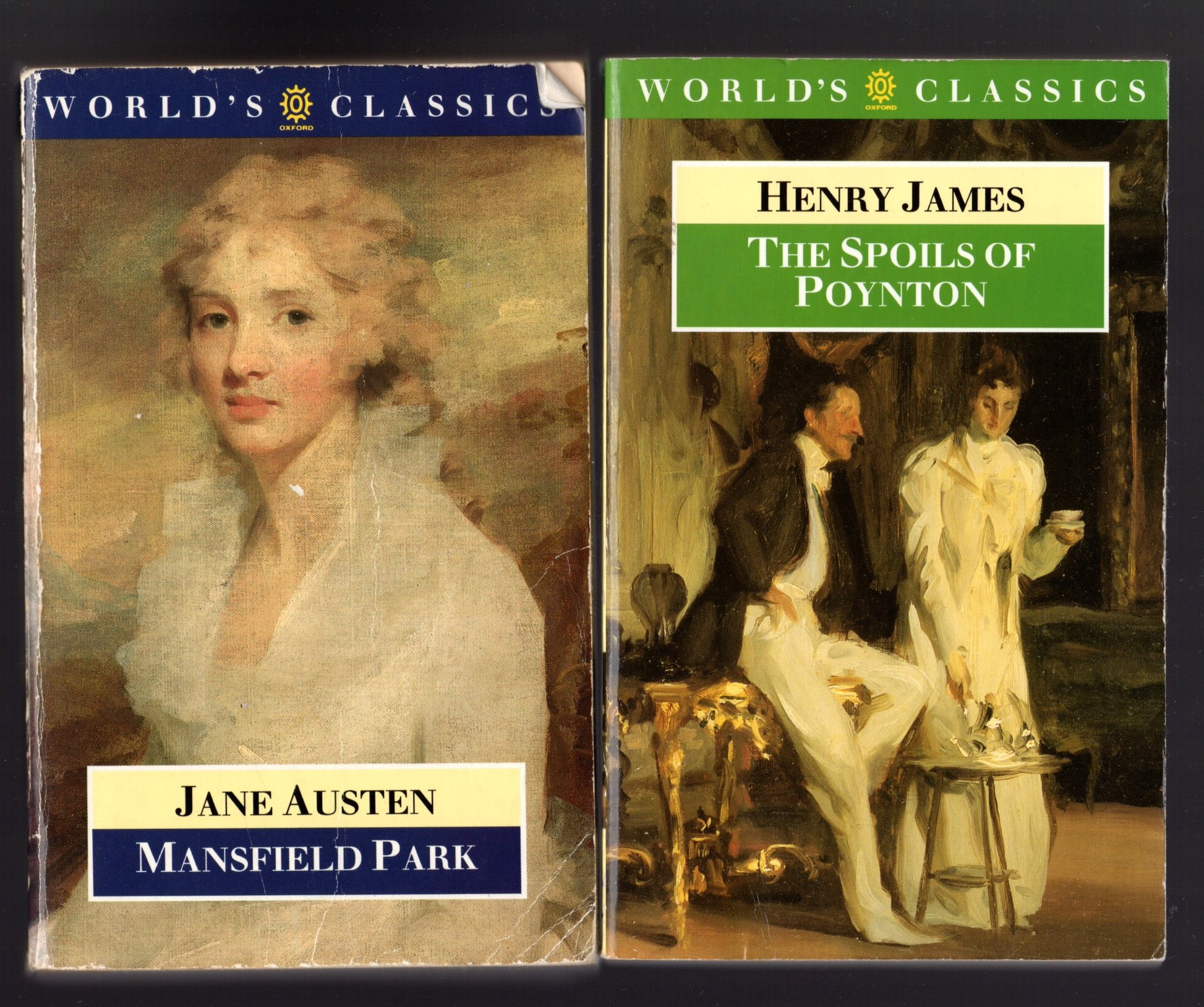
World's Classics paperbacks were printed with minor variations in design and colour scheme.

1998 cover with dark blue and off-white colour scheme.

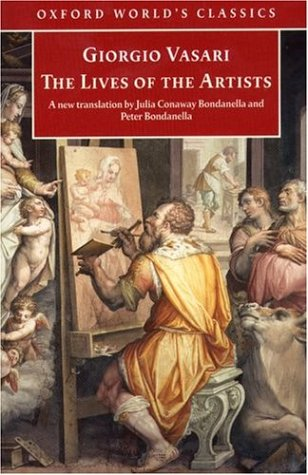
The cover of Giorgio Vasari's Lives of the Artists in the Oxford World's Classics series.

Oxford World's Classics is an imprint of Oxford University Press. First established in 1901 by Grant Richards and purchased by OUP in 1906, this imprint publishes primarily dramatic and classic literature for students and the general public. Its competitors include Penguin Classics, Everyman's Library, and the Modern Library. Most titles include critical apparatus – usually, an introduction, bibliography, chronology, and explanatory notes – as is the case with Penguin Classics.

== History ==
=== Grant Richards ===
The World's Classics imprint was created by London publisher Grant Richards in 1901. Richards had an "ambitious publishing programme", and this ambition led to the liquidation of Grant Richards in 1905. Henry Frowde, manager of the Oxford University Press, purchased the series in October 1905.

The Oxford World's Classics were classed as "the most famous works of the English Language" and many volumes contained introductions by distinguished authors, such as T. S. Eliot and Virginia Woolf, among others. The books were marketed as a cheap and accessible series for the general public to read some of the greatest works of literature:

“Cheaply and in little shelf space, the general reader can build up a library of those books, which, having become part of himself, he wishes now to make a part of his home.”

World's Classics were first published as ‘pocket-sized hardbacks’, measuring 6” by 3¾”.

=== Present day ===
In response to competition from Penguin, the series was relaunched in paperback format in March 1980, with twenty-four initial titles.

The World's Classics series was renamed in March 1998 as Oxford World's Classics. The new series initially had a dark blue and off-white colour scheme, but this was changed to red and off-white in July 1998 after Penguin Books USA brought a lawsuit, which argued that the new covers were similar in design to theirs, constituting an infringement on their 'trade dress' rights.

A decade later, a major redesign (retaining the basic red and white colour scheme) of all titles was introduced.

Many existing titles are reprints of texts established by the earlier Oxford English Novels series, with revisions to the critical material. Some of these titles have since been updated with new introductions and notes by different editors, while retaining the original base text. For example, the Oxford World's Classics edition of Emma has been updated twice with new introductions by different editors since it was first published in the series in 1980, while retaining the base text established by James Kinsley.

== Series ==
=== Oxford English Drama ===
Oxford English Drama editions offer a selection of plays, selected from an author's œuvre or as an anthology of plays linked by topic or theme (e. g. Four Revenge Tragedies). Renaissance, Restoration and eighteenth-century plays have glossaries of archaic words appended, in addition to the usual array of critical material. The series' general editor is Michael Cordner of the University of York. Scholar Anne Barton praised the series as a 'splendid and imaginative project', adding that it 'should reshape the canon in a number of significant areas'.

=== Major works ===
Major Works are mini-anthologies of an author's most significant works and selected correspondence. For example, the Major Works edition of Alexander Pope includes the major poems like The Rape of the Lock and The Dunciad, alongside prose essays like Peri Bathous, and an excerpt of his translation of Homer. Some editions include whole novels as well; the Major Works edition of Oscar Wilde anthologised many of his plays and prose alongside the whole of The Picture of Dorian Gray. Most titles are often reprints (with revisions) of volumes from an earlier Oxford series, Oxford Authors, under the general editorship of Frank Kermode.

=== Classical texts ===
Oxford World's Classics feature multiple works from antiquity in new translations. One notable series consists of Latin standards including The Golden Ass by Apuleius, and The Satyricon by Petronius translated and with introductions by P.G.Walsh. Another is the Euripides series translated from the Greek by James Morwood and Robin Waterfield, including Medea, The Bacchae and 17 other plays by Euripides. The series comprises five volumes, each with an introduction by the classicist Edith Hall.

== See also ==
- Penguin Classics
- Western canon
- Classic book
