= Kai Lung Unrolls His Mat =

1928 novel by Ernest Bramah

- First edition (UK)
- Author: Ernest Bramah
- Language: English
- Series: Kai Lung
- Genre: Fantasy
- Publisher: Richards Press (UK); Doubleday, Doran (US)
- Publication date: 1928
- Publication place: United Kingdom
- Media type: Print (Hardback)
- Pages: vii, 344
- Preceded by: Kai Lung's Golden Hours
- Followed by: The Moon of Much Gladness

Kai Lung Unrolls His Mat is a fantasy novel by English writer Ernest Bramah. It was first published in 1928 and has been reprinted a number of times since, most notably as the sixty-fourth volume of the celebrated Ballantine Adult Fantasy series in February 1974.

== Plot introduction ==
This book consists of three parts. In the first, Kai Lung's village has been pillaged by the evil Ming Shu, and not only have his house and garden been destroyed, but his wife has also been taken away. It is left to the story-teller's wits to think of a plan to defeat Ming Shu and reclaim his property.

In the second part, Kai Lung overhears a neighbor using an improper analogy and decides to educate him by providing an example of a properly composed piece of prose.

In the third part, Kai Lung receives the distinction of being allowed to practise his craft before any official within three and a half li of his residence, provided that official is not engaged in important business at the time, and is authorized to style himself as "Literary Instructor to the Shades of Female Ancestors". He then finds a suitable occasion to launch into one of his narratives.

=== Explanation of the novel's title ===
Unrolling his mat is something Kai Lung does very often (usually under a mulberry tree), to tell his tales.

== Plot summary ==
Kai Lung adventures usually serve as mere excuses to bring upside stories along the way, which typically take up the better part of a Kai Lung book. However, this is one of the few books that has a purposeful main narrative as well as intriguing side stories.

=== Part One: The Protecting Ancestors ===
==== The main plot ====
Kai Lung comes home one day to meet his wife but finds everything in a state of disarray. An elderly neighbour tells him that the village has been devastated by Ming Shu. Kai Lung goes in the direction of Ming Shu. Along the way, he meets barbarians, a poor farmer named Thang, a bandless captain in the city of Chi-U, and finally (disguised as Mang-hi, a foreigner from the land of Kham) Ming Shu himself.

==== Substories ====
===== Wan and the Remarkable Shrub =====
A sage, finding sleep to be an unwelcome obstruction to his pursuit of enlightenment, cuts off his eyelids and throws them away. At the spot where his eyelids land grows a shrub whose leaves look like his eyelids. Later, during a famine, the shrub is rediscovered and used to make a potion that soon becomes famous enough to catch the attention of the emperor, who subsequently bestows great honors on Wan.

===== Wong Tsoi and the Merchant Teen King's Thumb =====
A case of two people with the same fingerprints creates difficulties which are resolved by the mandarin Wong Tsoi.

===== Tong So, the Averter of Calamities =====
A ring of thieves realizes that its members don't need to take the trouble to steal to make a living, if they exact a tribute from everyone in the town in return for a promise not to give them any trouble.

===== Lin Ho and the Treasure of Fang-tso =====
Lin Ho, an ugly boy, is orphaned and sent to live with his rich uncle, who employs him as a slave. Lin Ho has been taught to do the best he can and not worry about the reaction to his actions, so he accepts this lot stoically. Then, one day, his uncle decides to get rid of him by sending him to make an offering at a shrine, giving him a lunch that contains a poisoned onion. At the foot of the hill containing the shrine, Lin Ho meets a proud warrior named Lam-Kwong, who, on the pretense that one cannot speak to the gods with onion breath, takes his onion, devours it greedily, and then dies—but not before killing Lin Ho with a stone directed at his head. Lin Ho goes to heaven, but the beings there are not quite ready to receive him, and so, as a reward for the virtuous life he has led so far, he is allowed to reënter his body. However, once he comes back to earth, he sees his own body lying beside that of Lam-Kwong and decides that it would be much nicer to inhabit the forbidding body of a warrior than to resume his original post. This, however, poses a problem, for now he needs to work out what is expected of him…

===== Kin Weng and the Miraculous Tusk =====
The apprentice to an ivory-carver, who works diligently but without much reward, wanders into the woods one day, and sees a tree, a pagoda, and a young woman, all of perfect proportion…

=== Part Two: The Great Sky Lantern ===
Some years later, Kai Lung tells a story to an unwilling listener, a suitor of one of his daughters.

==== The Story of the Philosopher Kou Tsun and of his daughter, Peerless Chou ====
At an early mythical period of imagined history, a young man redeems his word to cut a crescent off the moon, in order to win a young lady's hand.

=== Part Three: The Bringer of Good News ===
Kai Lung is informed by his neighbors that he has received official honorable recognition, though he is displeased when he discovers it is for rumored skills he does not possess, rather than for his real accomplishments.

==== Ching-Kwei and the Destinies ====
The last scion of a deposed dynasty overthrows a corrupt monarch and finds happiness, and a prophecy comes true, though not in the expected way.

== Characters in "Kai Lung Unrolls His Mat" ==
- Kai Lung, the main character.
- Hwa-mei, his wife.
- Ming Shu, the antagonist.

== Allusions/references to other works ==
Much mention is made of Chinese mythology, such as a creation myth, as well as belief in various supernatural beings (most commonly referred to as "demons"), and the almost commonplace practice of magic and divination through omens. Also, some aspects of Chinese cosmology are incorporated, such as geocentricity, and the division between "Upper Air", "Middle Air", and "Lower Air".

== Allusions/references to actual history, geography and current science ==
Various allusions are made to actual events and periods in Chinese history, such as the Golden Age of Han.

The topography seems to be largely invented, though places are given plausible-sounding names.

The names and toponyms do not seem to conform to any single dialect of Chinese; some names look more Mandarin (transliterated, of course, with the Wade-Giles system, as was the convention at the time), others more Cantonese. This is evidence that the names are largely invented.

Cover of Ballantine Adult Fantasy edition

== Publication history ==
- London: The Richards Press Ltd., 1928, hardcover
- Garden City, New York: Doubleday, Doran & Company, Inc., 1928, hardcover
- London: Jonathan Cape, 1935, hardcover
- London: Penguin Books, 1937, paperback
- New York: Ballantine Books SBN 345237870, February 1974, paperback
