= Dumpy Books for Children =

The Dumpy Books for Children were a series of small-format books selected by E. V. Lucas and published by British publisher Grant Richards between 1897 and 1904. Subsequent books were published by Chatto & Windus and by Sampson, Low.

== Books in the collection ==
| Order | Title | Author | Illustrator | Year |
|---|---|---|---|---|
| 01 | The Flamp and Other Stories | E. V. Lucas | | 1897 |
| 02 | Mrs Turner's Cautionary Stories | | | 1897 |
| 03 | The Bad Family and Other Stories | Mrs. Fenwick | | 1899 |
| 04 | The Story of Little Black Sambo | Helen Bannerman | Helen Bannerman | 1899 |
| 05 | The Bountiful Lady | Thomas Cobb | | 1900 |
| 06 | A Cat Book | E. V. Lucas | H. Officer Smith | 1901 |
| 07 | A Flower Book | Eden Coybee | Nellie Benson | 1901 |
| 08 | The Pink Knight | J. R. Monsell | J. R. Monsell | 1901 |
| 09 | The Little Clown | Thomas Cobb | | 1901 |
| 10 | A Horse Book | Mary Tourtel | | 1901 |
| 11 | Little People: An Alphabet | T. W. H. Crosland | Henry Mayer | 1901 |
| 12 | A Dog Book | Ethel Bicknell | C. Moore Park | 1902 |
| 13 | The Adventures of Samuel and Selina | Jean C. Archer | | 1902 |
| 14 | The Little Lost Girl | Eleanor Raper | | 1902 |
| 15 | Dollies | Richard Hunter | Ruth Cobb | 1902 |
| 16 | The Bad Mrs. Ginger | Honor C. Appleton | Honor C. Appleton | 1902 |
| 17 | Peter Piper's Practical Principles | | | 1902 |
| 18 | The Little White Barbara | Eleanor S. March | | 1902 |
| 19 | Japanese Dumpy | Yoshio Markino | Yoshio Markino | 1903 |
| 20 | Towlocks and His Wooden Horse | Alice Appleton | Honor C. Appleton | 1903 |
| 21 | The Three Little Foxes | Mary Tourtel | | 1903 |
| 22 | The Old Man's Bag | T. W. H. Crosland | J. R. Monsell | 1903 |
| 23 | The Three Goblins | M. G. Taggart | | 1903 |
| 24 | Dumpy Proverbs | Honor C. Appleton | Honor C. Appleton | 1903 |
| 25 | More Dollies | Richard Hunter | Ruth Cobb | 1903 |
| 26 | Little Yellow Wang-Lo | M.C. Bell | | 1903 |
| 27 | Plain Jane | G. M. George | G. M. C. Fry | 1903 |
| 28 | The Sooty Man | E. B. Mackinnon and Eden Coybee | | 1903 |
| 29 | Fishy Winkle | Jean Archer | Jean Archer | 1903 |
| 30 | Rosalina | Jean Archer | | 1904 |
| 31 | Sammy and the Snarliwink | Lena and Norman Ault | | 1904 |
| 32 | The Motor Car Dumpy book | T. W. H. Crosland | J. R. Monsell | 1904 |
| 33 | Irene's Christmas Party | Richard Hunter | Ruth Cobb | 1904 |
| 34 | The Little Soldier Book | Jessie Pope | Henry Mayer | 1907 |
| 35 | A Dutch Doll's Ditties | C. Aubrey Moore | | 1907 |
| 36 | Ten Little Nigger Boys | Nora Case | | 1907 |
| 37 | Humpty Dumpty's Little Son | Helen Reid Cross | | 1907 |
| 38 | Simple Simon | Helen Reid Cross | | |
| 39 | The Little Frenchman | Eden Coybee | K. J. Fricero | |
| 40 | The Story of an Irish Potato | Lily Schofield | | |
