= The Secret of the League =

1907 novel by Ernest Bramah

- Author: Ernest Bramah
- Language: English
- Publication date: 1907

What Might Have Been is a 1907 British dystopian novel by Ernest Bramah (published in USA as The Secret of the League, 1909), which describes a successful overthrow of a democratically elected British Labour Party government by members of the upper classes, and depicts such an overthrow as being a positive and desirable outcome.

George Orwell credited the book with having given a considerably accurate prediction of the rise of Fascism, and also with reflecting "the mentality of the middle classes" and the brutal measures which members of these classes might condone should they feel threatened with a revolution — "even such a decent and kindly writer as Ernest Bramah", in Orwell's words.

== Background behind the book ==
The book was written after the 1906 United Kingdom general election, in which the Labour Party, formed just seven years before, gained 29 parliamentary seats — a great increase from the two seats it had before — and for the first time became a serious factor of British politics. The idea of Labour gaining a majority, though still apparently unlikely, was no longer impossible — a prospect which some Britons, evidently including Bramah, considered alarming, especially since the period after the elections featured intensive labour disputes and militant strikes.

== Plot summary ==
In the fictional British history depicted in the book, the Labour Party wins an overwhelming majority in general elections and forms a government. They do not institute a completely socialist economy, but increase wages frequently, tax the upper classes greatly and create a large government bureaucracy. In foreign policy, the Labour Government is conciliatory towards other powers and curtails military spending.

A powerful upper-class cabal (the "League" of the title), whose members feel that "the country is going to the dogs", makes careful secret preparations for overthrowing the government. Over two years, they secretly hoard large quantities of fuel oil and convert coal-burning plants to oil-burning. Then, they suddenly announce a consumer strike against the coal industry — at the time, a central part of the British economy — and cause large-scale unemployment and distress among coal miners and secondary industries dependent on coal. This culminates in civil war, during which the upper-class conspirators gain foreign help and are victorious.

Once in power, they forcibly dismantle the trade unions and institute a "strong" non-parliamentary regime resembling in many ways the Fascist regimes formed decades after the book's publication. As mentioned, the members of the League are the heroes of the story and their acts are described as positive and worthy.

The policies which Bramah attributed to his fictional Labour government proved a good prediction of those actually enacted by the Labour government of Clement Attlee, which gained power as a result of the 1945 United Kingdom general election. Bramah's fictional scenario significantly resembles how the Socialist government of President Salvador Allende in Chile (1970–1973) was "destabilised" and eventually overthrown with the help of the United States of America.
