= Helen Bannerman =

Scottish children's writer (1862–1946)

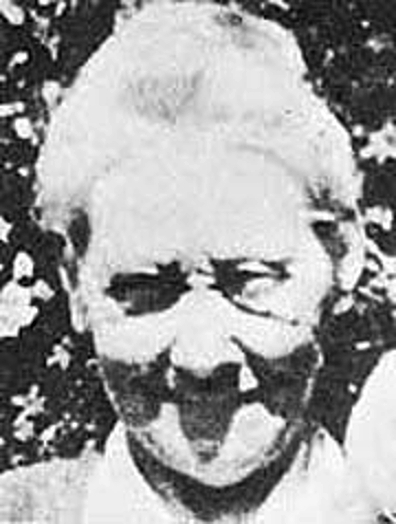
- Helen Bannerman
- Born: Helen Brodie Cowan Watson; 25 February 1862; Edinburgh, Scotland
- Died: 13 October 1946 (aged 84); Edinburgh, Scotland
- Resting place: Grange Cemetery, Edinburgh, Scotland
- Education: University of St. Andrews (LLA)
- Occupation: Author
- Spouse: William Burney Bannerman (m. 1889, died)
- Children: 4
- Relatives: Tom Kibble (grandson); Robert Boog Watson (father); Patrick Heron Watson (uncle); Alexander Cowan (grandfather)
- Writing career
- Years active: 1889–1936
- Genre: Children's books
- Notable work: Little Black Sambo

Helen Brodie Cowan Bannerman (née Watson; 25 February 1862 – 13 October 1946) was a Scottish children's writer. She is best known for her first book, Little Black Sambo (1899).

== Life ==
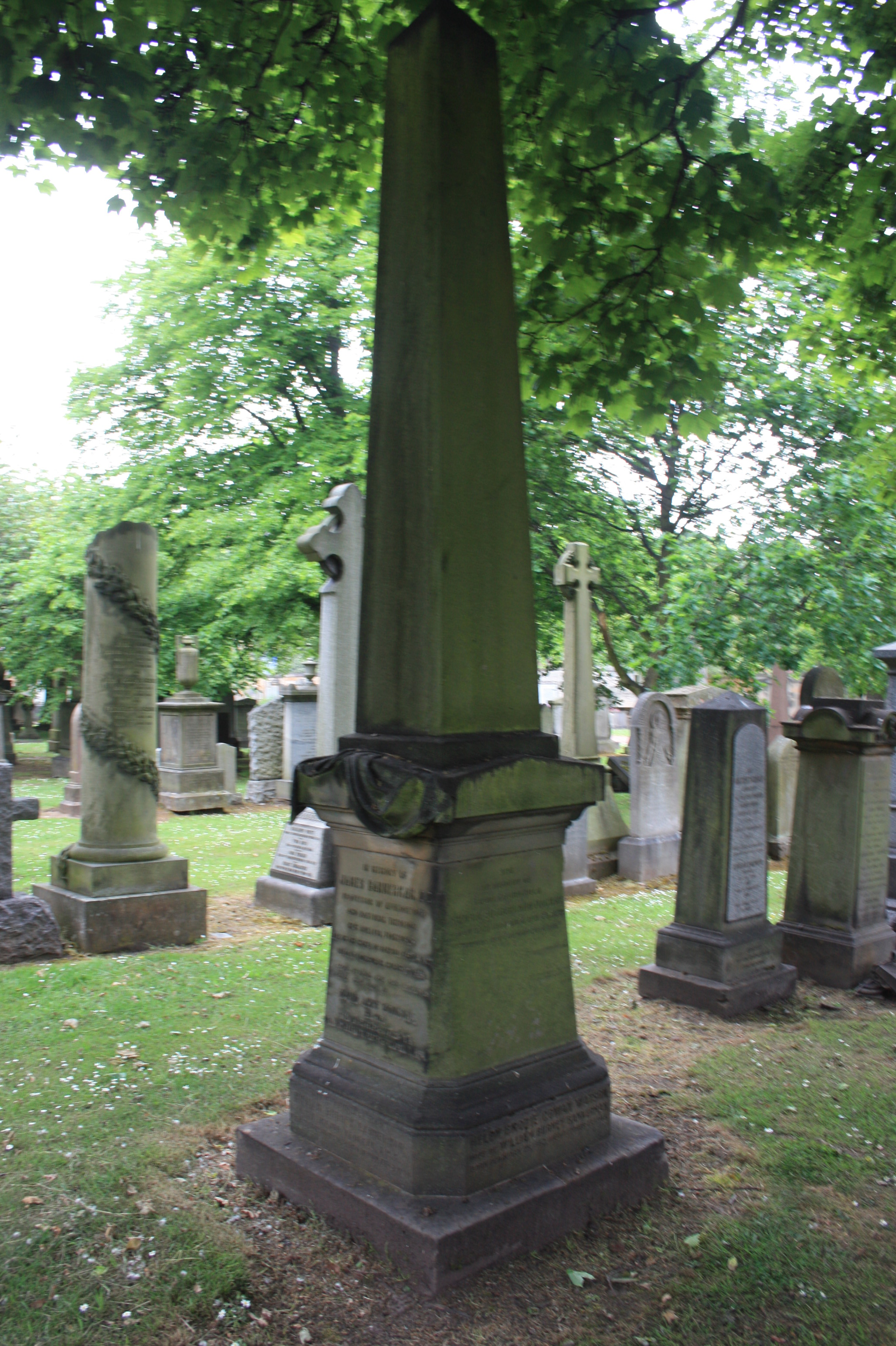
The Bannerman grave, Grange Cemetery

Bannerman was born at 35 Royal Terrace, Edinburgh. She was the eldest daughter and fourth child of seven children of Robert Boog Watson (1823–1910), minister of the Free Church of Scotland and malacologist, and his wife Janet (1831–1912), daughter of Helen Brodie and the papermaker and philanthropist Alexander Cowan. Between the ages of 2-12, she lived in Madeira, where her father was minister at the Scottish church. When the family returned, they spent much time with their maternal aunt, Mrs Cowan, at 35 Royal Terrace on Calton Hill.

Because women were not admitted into Scottish universities at the time, she sat external examinations set by the University of St. Andrews, attaining the qualification of Lady Literate in Arts (LLA) in 1887. She then married Dr William Burney Bannerman, a physician and an officer in the Indian Medical Service (IMS), in 1889.

The couple moved to India in 1889, taking up residence in Madras (modern-day Chennai), capital of the state of Tamil Nadu on the southeastern seacoast, populated mostly by the Tamil ethnic group. During their thirty years in India, they had four children: daughters Janet (b. 1893) and Day (b. 1896), and sons James "Pat" Patrick (b. 1900) and Robert (b. 1902).

Bannerman and her husband returned to Edinburgh in 1918; he died in 1924. She died at home on 13 October 1946, of cerebral thrombosis and a fractured femur; her body was cremated. She is buried with her husband in Grange Cemetery in south Edinburgh.

Bannerman was the grandmother of the physicist Tom Kibble, who discovered the Higgs–Kibble mechanism and the Higgs boson.

== Works ==
The illustrations and settings of Bannerman's books are all about Indians and their culture. Little Black Sambo has ghee, tigers, and a bazaar, The Story of Little Black Mingo has jungle, a mugger crocodile, a dhobi, and a mongoose, Little Black Quasha has a bazaar and tigers, and The Story of Little Black Quibba has mangoes and elephants.

- The Story of Little Black Sambo, 1899
- Story of Little Black Mingo, 1901
- The Story of Little Black Quibba, 1902
- Little Degchie-Head: An Awful Warning to Bad Babas, 1903
- Little Kettle-Head, 1904
- Pat and the Spider, 1905
- The Story of the Teasing Monkey, 1907
- Little Black Quasha, 1908
- Story of Little Black Bobtail, 1909
- Sambo and the Twins, 1936
- The Story of Little White Squibba, 1966 Finished by her daughter

== See also ==
- Golliwogg
