= Ernest Bramah =

English author

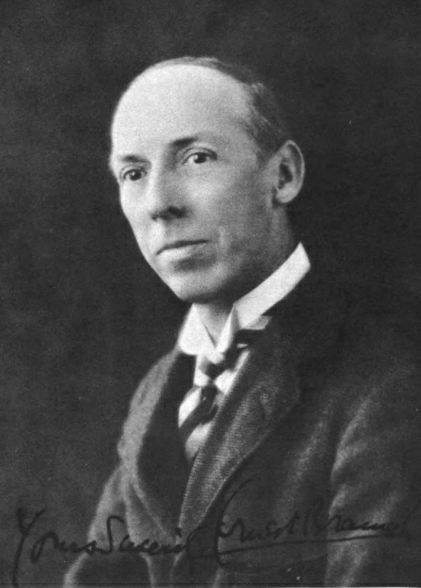
- Born: Ernest Bramah Smith; 20 March 1868 near Manchester, England
- Died: 27 June 1942 (aged 74); Hammersmith, London, England

Ernest Brammah Smith (20 March 1868 – 23 June 1942), who wrote under the pseudonym of Ernest Bramah, was an English author. He published 21 books and numerous short stories and features. His humorous works were often ranked with Jerome K. Jerome and W. W. Jacobs, his detective stories with Conan Doyle, his politico-science fiction with H. G. Wells, and his supernatural stories with Algernon Blackwood. George Orwell acknowledged that Bramah's book What Might Have Been influenced his Nineteen Eighty-Four. Bramah created the characters Kai Lung and Max Carrados.

== Early career ==
Ernest Brammah Smith (the spelling of his middle name on his birth certificate was recorded by the register as 'Brammah', not 'Bramah') was born in Manchester, England, in 1868, the son of Charles Clement Smith and Susannah (Brammah) Smith. Aged 16, he quit Manchester Grammar School, having been near the bottom in each subject. He became a farmer, first as a pupil and then in his own right. He was assisted financially by his father, who had transformed in a short time from a factory hand to a wealthy man. The farming enterprise cost his father £100,000 in modern money, but it was while farming that Bramah began to contribute local vignettes to the Birmingham News. Later he wrote a satirical book about his adventures in farming. It had few buyers, and was remaindered and pulped, though his father agreed to assist him financially while he made his way in Grub Street as a writer. He eventually obtained a position as secretary to Jerome K. Jerome and became editor of one of Jerome's magazines. After quitting Jerome, Smith edited other journals for a publishing business that later went bankrupt.

== Writing career ==
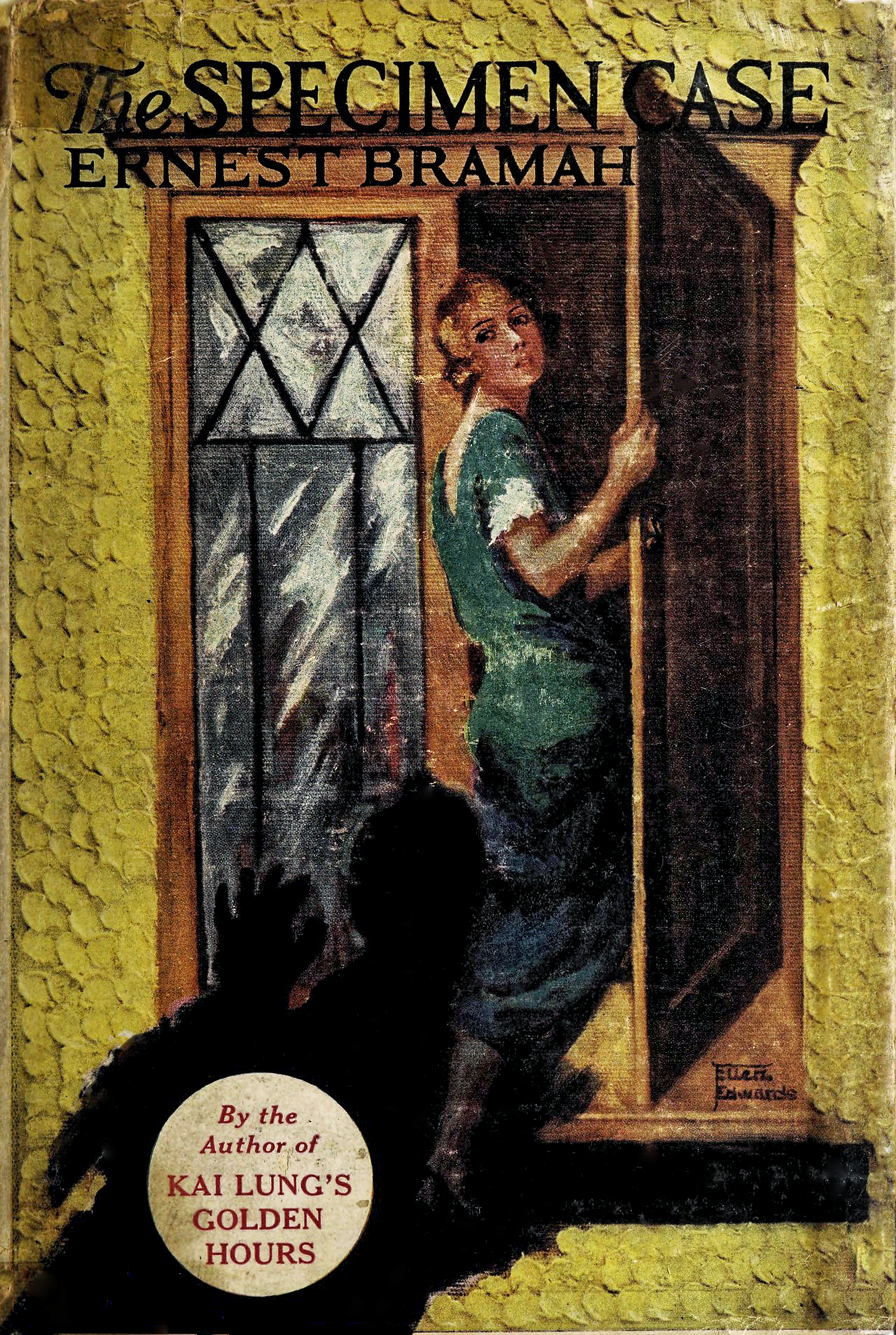
The Specimen Case by Ernest Bramah, with cover illustration by Mary Ellen Edwards.

Bramah attained commercial and critical success with his creation of Kai Lung, an itinerant storyteller. He first appears in The Wallet of Kai Lung which was rejected by eight publishers before Grant Richards published it in 1900. It was still in print a hundred years later. The Kai Lung stories are humorous tales set in China, often with fantasy elements such as dragons and gods.

With Kai Lung, Bramah developed a style of narration typified by the following passages:

- "Kai Lung rose guardedly to his feet, with many gestures of polite assurance and having bowed several times to indicate his pacific nature, he stood in an attitude of deferential admiration. At this display the elder and less attractive of the maidens fled, uttering loud and continuous cries of apprehension to conceal the direction of her flight".
- "In particular, there is among this august crowd of Mandarins one Wang Yu, who has departed on three previous occasions without bestowing the reward of a single cash. If the feeble and covetous Wang Yu will place in his very ordinary bowl the price of one of his exceedingly ill-made pipes, this unworthy person will proceed."
- "After secretly observing the unstudied grace of her movements, the most celebrated picture-maker of the province burned the implements of his craft, and began life anew as a trainer of performing elephants."

The Kai Lung stories include many proverbs and aphorisms, such as the following:

- "He who lacks a single tael sees many bargains"
- "It is a mark of insincerity of purpose to spend one’s time in looking for the sacred Emperor in low-class teashops"
- "It has been said there are few situations in life that cannot be honourably settled, and without loss of time, either by suicide, a bag of gold or by thrusting a despised antagonist over the edge of a precipice on a dark night"

Bramah also wrote political science fiction. What Might Have Been, published in 1907 and republished as The Secret of the League in 1909, is an anti-socialist dystopia representing Bramah's conservative political opinions. It was acknowledged by George Orwell as a source for Nineteen Eighty-Four. Orwell credited it with giving a considerably accurate prediction of the rise of Fascism.

At a time when the English Channel had yet to be crossed by an aeroplane, Bramah foresaw aerial express trains traveling at 10,000 feet, a nationwide wireless-telegraphy network, a prototype fax machine and a cypher typewriter similar to the German Enigma machine.

In 1914, Bramah created Max Carrados, a blind detective. Given the outlandish idea that a blind man could be a detective, in the introduction to the second Carrados book The Eyes of Max Carrados, Bramah compared his hero's achievements to those of real-life blind people such as Nicholas Saunderson, Lucasian Professor of Mathematics at Cambridge, Blind Jack of Knaresborough the road builder, John Fielding the Bow Street Magistrate (of whom it was said he could identify 3,000 thieves by their voices), and Helen Keller.

In 1929, Bramah wrote the book "English Regal Copper Coins" which was published by Methuen. The book concentrates on British copper coinage from 1671 during the reign of Charles II until the end of pure copper coin production in 1860. The book is still used widely by numismatic auction houses throughout the world with Bramah reference numbers. The section on coin rarity as a percentage of production for each year is still considered useful to date.

== "Interesting times" and other quotations ==
Bramah has been credited with the invention of the saying, quoted often as an ancient Chinese curse, "May you live in interesting times", along with "May you come to the attention of those in authority" and "May you find what you are looking for". However, these do not appear in the Kai Lung stories.

== Archives at Harry Ransom Center ==
Bramah's manuscripts, correspondence and additional materials including his work for Jerome K. Jerome and as staff member for the magazine Today, The Idler and the Grosvenor Press are held at the University of Texas Harry Ransom Center. A letter of 27 April 1923 from Bramah to Grant Richards explains that he had never been to China.

== Personal life and death ==
Bramah was a very private man who did not make public any details of his personal life. He was married to Lucy Maisie Smith. He died at the age of 74 in Weston-super-Mare, Somerset, leaving an estate valued at £15,172 ((equivalent to £618,059 in 2025)). After his death, his widow presented a collection of all his published books to the Hammersmith borough libraries, for reference use only. Bramah had lived in Hammersmith for some 30 years, not far from Ravenscourt Park.

== Select bibliography ==
=== Kai Lung ===
==== Books ====
- The Wallet of Kai Lung (1900)
  - "The Transmutation of Ling"
  - "The Story of Yung Chang"
  - "The Probation of Sen Heng"
  - "The Experiment of the Mandarin Chan Hung"
  - "The Confession of Kai Lung"
  - "The Vengeance of Tung Fel"
  - "The Career of the Charitable Quen-Ki-Tong"
  - "The Vision of Yin, the Son of Yat Huang"
  - "The Ill-Regulated Destiny of Kin Yen, the Picture-Maker"
- Kai Lung's Golden Hours (1922)
  - "The Story of Wong Ts'in and the Willow Plate Embellishment"
  - "The Story of Ning, the Captive God, and the Dreams That Mark His Race"
  - "The Story of Wong Pao and the Minstrel"
  - "The Story of Lao Ting and the Luminous Insect"
  - "The Story of Weng Cho or the One Devoid of Name"
  - "The Story of Wang Ho and the Burial Robe"
  - "The Story of Chang Tao, Melodious Vision and the Dragon"
  - "The Story of Yuen Yan, of the Barber Chou-hu, and of His Wife, Tsae-che"
  - 'The Story of Hien and the Chief Examiner'
  - "The Story of the Loyalty of Ten-teh, the Fisherman"
- Kai Lung Unrolls His Mat (1928)
  - "The Story of Wan and the Remarkable Shrub"
  - "The Story of Wong Tsoi and the Merchant Teen King's Thumb"
  - "The Story of Tong So, the Averter of Calamities"
  - "The Story of Lin Ho and the Treasure of Fang-Tso"
  - "The Story of Kin Weng and the Miraculous Tusk"
  - "The Story of the Philosopher Kuo Tsun and of His Daughter, Peerless Chou"
  - "The Story of Ching-kwei and the Destinies"
- The Moon of Much Gladness (1932; published in the United States as The Return of Kai Lung)
- The Kai Lung Omnibus (1936)
  - The Wallet of Kai Lung
  - Kai Lung Unrolls His Mat
  - Kai Lung's Golden Hours'
- Kai Lung Beneath the Mulberry Tree (1940)
  - "The Story of Prince Ying, Virtuous Mei and the Pursuit of Worthiness"
  - "The Three Recorded Judgments of Prince Ying, from the Inscribed Scroll of Mou Tao, the Beggar"
  - "The Ignoble Alliance of Lin T'sing with the Outlaw Fang Wang, and How It Affected the Destinies"
  - "The Story of Yin Ho, Hoa-mi, and the Magician"
  - "The Story of Ton Hi, Precious Gem and the Inconspicuous Elephant"
  - "The Story of Sam-Tso, the Family Called Wong, and the Willing Buffalo"
  - "The Story of Saho Chi, the No-longer Merchant Ng Hon, and the Docile Linnets"
  - "The Story of the Poet Lao Ping, Chun Shin's Daughter Fa, and the Fighting Crickets"
- The Celestial Omnibus (1940)
  - "The Transmutation of Ling"
  - "The Vengeance of Tung Fel"
  - "The Confession of Kai Lung"
  - "The Encountering of Six Within a Wood"
  - "The Inexorable Justice of Mandarin Shan Tien"
  - "The Out-Passing into a State of Assured Felicity"
  - "The High-minded Strategy of the Amiable Hwa-mei"
  - "The Malignity of the Depraved Ming Shu"
  - "The Story of Prince Ying"
  - "The Story of the Poet Lao Ping"
- Kai Lung: Six (1974)
  - "The Story of Lam-Hoo and the Reward of Merit"
  - "The Story of Chung Pun and the Miraculous Peacocks"
  - "The Story of Yeun Yang and the Empty Soo-Shong Chest"
  - "The Story of Sing Tsung and the Exponent of Dark Magic"
  - "The Story Kwey Chao and the Grateful Song Bird"
  - "The Story Li Pao, Lucky Star and the Intruding Stranger"
- Kai Lung Raises His Voice (2010)
  - "The Subtlety of Kang Chieng" (previously unpublished)
  - "Ming Tseuen and the Emergency"
  - "Lam-Hoo and the Reward of Merit"
  - "Chung Pun and the Miraculous Peacocks"
  - "Yeun Yang and the Empty Lo-Chee Crate"
  - "Sing Tsung and the Exponent of Dark Magic"
  - "Kwey Chao and the Grateful Song Bird"
  - "Li Pao, Lucky Star and the Intruding Stranger"
  - "The Cupidity of Ah Pak or Riches No Protection Against Thunderbolts" (previously unpublished)
  - "The Romance of Kwang the Fruit Gatherer" (previously unpublished)
  - "The Destiny of Cheng, the Son of Sha-kien of the Waste Expanses" (previously unpublished)
  - "The Romance of Kwang the Fruit Gatherer" (alternative version; e-book only)
  - "The Emperor Who Meant Well" (previously unpublished)

=== Max Carrados ===
==== Books ====
- Max Carrados (1914)
  - "The Coin of Dionysius"
  - "The Knight's Cross Signal Problem"
  - "The Tragedy at Brookbend Cottage"
  - "The Clever Mrs. Straithwaite"
  - "The Last Exploit of Harry the Actor"
  - "The Tilling Shaw Mystery"
  - "The Comedy at Fountain Cottage"
  - "The Game Played in the Dark"
- The Eyes of Max Carrados (1923)
  - "The Virginiola Fraud"
  - "The Disappearance of Marie Severe"
  - "The Secret of Dunstan's Tower"
  - "The Mystery of the Poisoned Dish of Mushrooms"
  - "The Ghost of Massingham Mansions"
  - "The Missing Actress Sensation"
  - "The Ingenious Mr. Spinola"
  - "The Kingsmouth Spy Case"
  - "The Eastern Mystery"
- Max Carrados Mysteries (1927)
  - "The Secret of Headlam Height"
  - "The Mystery of the Vanished Petition Crown"
  - "The Holloway Flat Tragedy"
  - "The Curious Circumstances of the Two Left Shoes"
  - "The Ingenious Mind of Mr. Rigby Lacksome"
  - "The Crime at the House in Culver Street"
  - "The Strange Case of Cyril Bycourt"
  - "The Missing Witness Sensation"
- The Bravo of London (1934)
- Best Max Carrados Detective Stories (1972)
  - "The Coin of Dionysius"
  - "The Knight's Cross Signal Problem"
  - "The Tragedy at Brookbend Cottage"
  - "The Last Exploit of Harry the Actor"
  - "The Disappearance of Marie Severe"
  - "The Mystery of the Poisoned Dish of Mushrooms"
  - "The Ghost of Massingham Mansions"
  - "The Ingenious Mr. Spinola"
  - "The Mystery of the Vanished Petition Crown"
  - "The Holloway Flat Tragedy"
- The Eyes of Max Carrados (2013), comprises all of Bramah's writing about Max Carrados except the stage play Blind Man's Bluff and the radio broadcast "Meet Max Carrados"
  - Max Carrados
  - The Eyes of Max Carrados
  - Max Carrados Mysteries
  - "A Bunch of Violets"

==== Short stories ====
- "The Story of Yung Chang". First publication unknown; reprinted Melbourne Leader, 19 December 1896.
- "The Master Coiner Unmasked". News of the World, 17 August 1913. Collected in Max Carrados as "The Coin of Dionysius".
- "The Mystery of the Signals". News of the World, 24 and 31 August 1913. Collected in Max Carrados as "The Knights Cross Signal Problem".
- "The Tragedy at Brookbend Cottage". News of the World, 7 and 14 September 1913. Collected in Max Carrados.
- "The Clever Mrs. Straithwaite". News of the World, 21 and 28 September 1913. Collected in Max Carrados.
- "The Great Safe Deposit Coup". News of the World, 5 and 12 October 1913. Collected in Max Carrados as "The Last Exploit of Harry the Actor".
- "The Tilling Shaw Mystery". News of the World, 19 and 26 October 1913. Collected in Max Carrados.
- "The Secret of Dunstan's Tower". News of the World, 2 and 9 November 1913. Collected in The Eyes of Max Carrados.
- "The Comedy at Fountain Cottage". News of the World, 16 and 23 November 1913. Collected in Max Carrados.
- "The Kingsmouth German Spy Case". News of the World, 30 November and 7 December 1913. Collected in The Eyes of Max Carrados as "The Kingsmouth Spy Case".
- "The Missing Actress Sensation". News of the World, 14 December 1913. Collected in The Eyes of Max Carrados.
- "The Virginiola Fraud". News of the World, 21 December 1913. Collected in The Eyes of Max Carrados.
- "The Game Played in the Dark". News of the World, 28 December 1913. Collected in Max Carrados.
- "The Disappearance of Marie Severe". First published in The Eyes of Max Carrados.
- "The Mystery of the Poisoned Dish of Mushrooms". First published in The Eyes of Max Carrados; also published as "Who Killed Charlie Winpole?"
- "The Ghost at Massingham Mansions". First published in The Eyes of Max Carrados.
- "The Ingenious Mr. Spinola". First published in The Eyes of Max Carrados.
- "The Eastern Mystery". First published in The Eyes of Max Carrados.
- "The Bunch of Violets". Strand Magazine, July 1924. Collected in The Specimen Case.
- "The Secret of Headlam Heights". The New Magazine, December 1925. Collected in Max Carrados Mysteries.
- "The Mystery of the Vanished Petition Crown". The New Magazine, January 1926. Collected in Max Carrados Mysteries.
- "The Crime at the House in Culver Street". The New Magazine, February 1926. Collected in Max Carrados Mysteries.
- "The Curious Circumstances of the Two Left Shoes". The New Magazine, May 1926. Collected in Max Carrados Mysteries.
- "The Strange Case of Cyril Bycourt". The New Magazine, June 1926. Collected in Max Carrados Mysteries.
- "The Missing Witness Sensation". Pearson's Magazine, July 1926. Collected in Max Carrados Mysteries.
- "The Holloway Flat Tragedy". The Story-Teller, March 1927. Collected in Max Carrados Mysteries.
- "The Ingenious Mind of Mr. Rigby Lacksome". First published in Max Carrados Mysteries.
- "Meet Max Carrados". BBC, 3 May 1935. A profile and commentary by Bramah on the character's origins.

==== Stage plays ====
- Blind Man's Bluff (1918). Collected in Bodies from the Library (Ed. Tony Medawar). Previously unpublished

==== Stage plays by others ====
- In the Dark (1917) by Gilbert Heron, adapted from The Game Played in the Dark

=== Other fiction ===
==== Books ====
- What Might Have Been (1900)
- The Mirror of Kong Ho (1905)
- The Secret of the League (1907). Revised version of What Might Have Been.
- The Transmutation of Ling (1912)
- The Specimen Case (1924)
  - "Ming-Tsuen and the Emergency" (Kai Lung)
  - "The Delicate Case of Mlle. Celestine Bon"
  - "The Dead March"
  - "A Very Black Business"
  - "The Bunch of Violets" (Max Carrados)
  - "Revolution"
  - "Smothered in Corpses"
  - "Fate and a Family Council"
  - "Lucretia and the Horse-Doctor"
  - "The War Hawks"
  - "The Great Hockington Find"
  - "Hautpierre's Star"
  - "The Goose and the Golden Egg"
  - "The Making of Marianna"
  - "Bobbie and Poetic Justice"
  - "The Heart of the Pagan"
  - "Once in a Blue Moon"
  - "The Marquise Ring"
  - "The 'Dragon' of Swafton"
  - "The Dream of William Elgood"
  - "From a London Balcony"
- Short Stories of To-day and Yesterday (1929)
  - "Hien and the Chief Examiner"
  - "Wong Pao and the Minstrel"
  - "Chang Tao, Melodious Vision and the Dragon"
  - "Wong T'sin and the Willow Plate Embellishment"
  - "The Secret of Headlam Height"
  - "The Curious Circumstances of the Two Left Shoes"
  - "The Missing Actress Sensation"
  - "The Delicate Case of Mlle. Celestine Bon"
  - "A Very Black Business"
  - "Smothered in Corpses"
  - "The Goose and the Golden Egg"
- A Little Flutter (1930)

==== Short stories ====
- "The Story of Yung Chang". Chapman's Magazine, October 1896. Collected in The Wallet of Kai Lung.
- "The Story of Kin-Yen, the Picture-Maker". Crampton's Magazine, December 1898; also published as 'The Ill-Regulated Destiny of Kin Yeng, the Picture-Maker'. Collected in The Wallet of Kai Lung.
- "The Duplicity of Tiao". The Woman at Home, December 1900.
- "The Impiety of Yuan Yan". Macmillan's Magazine, February 1904.
- "The 'Dragon' of Swafton". The Graphic, Summer 1904. Collected in The Specimen Case.
- "While You Wait". The Bystander, December 1905 (a dialogue).
- "The Heart of the Pagan". The Grand Magazine, April 1906. Collected in The Specimen Case.
- "The Goose and the Golden Egg". The Grand Magazine, February 1907. Collected in The Specimen Case.
- "The War Hawks". Pall Mall Magazine, September 1909. Collected in The Specimen Case.
- "The Great Hockington Find". Pall Mall Magazine, February 1910. Collected in The Specimen Case.
- "The Red Splinter". Wickepin Argus, 3 April 1913.
- "The Chief Examiner". Methuen's Annual, 1914. Collected in Kai Lung's Golden Hours.
- "Wang-Ho and the Burial Robe". The London Mercury, September 1920. Collected in Kai Lung's Golden Hours.
- "Lao Ting and the Luminous Insect". The London Mercury, June 1922. . Collected in Kai Lung's Golden Hours.
- "The Story of Kin Weng and the Miraculous Tusk". The London Mercury, June 1927. Collected in Kai Lung Unrolls His Mat.

==== Stage plays adapted by others ====
- Kai Lung's Golden Hours (1931) by Allan D Mainds
- The Willow Pattern (1937) by Colonel Newton
- The Probation of Sen Heng (1937) by unknown adaptor

=== Nonfiction books ===
- English Farming and Why I Turned It Up (1894)
- A Handbook for Writers and Artists: A Practical Guide for Contributors to the Press and to Literary and Artistic Publications; by a London editor [i.e., E. B. Smith]. London: Charles William Deacon & Co., 1897
- A Guide to the Varieties and Rarity of English Regal Copper Coins: Charles II–Victoria, 1671–1860 (1929)
