= A Trap to Catch a Cracksman =

- Short story by E. W. Hornung
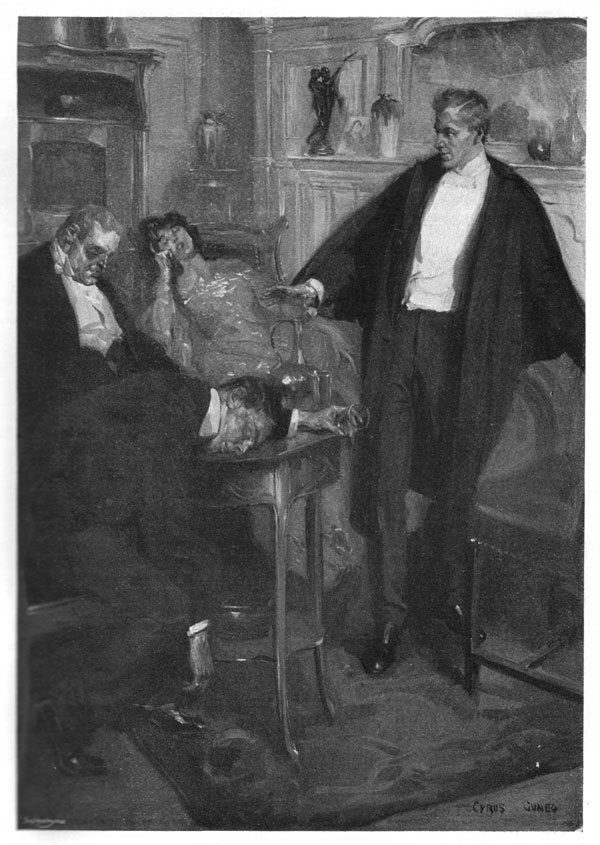
- 1905 Pall Mall illustration by Cyrus Cuneo
- Country: United Kingdom
- Language: English
- Genre(s): Crime fiction

Publication
- Publisher: Pall Mall Magazine
- Media type: Print (Magazine)
- Publication date: July 1905

Chronology
- Series: A. J. Raffles
A Bad Night	The Spoils of Sacrilege

"A Trap to Catch a Cracksman" is a short story by E. W. Hornung, and features the gentleman thief A. J. Raffles, and his companion and biographer, Bunny Manders. The story was published in July 1905 by Pall Mall Magazine in London. The story was also included as the seventh story in the collection A Thief in the Night, published by Chatto & Windus in London, and Charles Scribner's Sons in New York, both in 1905.

== Plot ==
Very early morning, Bunny receives a vague and distressing telephone call from Raffles, telling Bunny that he has fallen into Maguire's trap. Barney Maguire, the heavyweight champion of the United States who is in England to fight a leading British contender, had met Raffles and Bunny at the Imperial Sporting Club a week ago and invited them to his home. Raffles had admired Maguire's many jewels and valuable trophies, and, being further encouraged by Maguire's boast that he had devised a perfect trap to catch any cracksman, had decided to steal Maguire's trophies on the night after Maguire was to fight the British champion, correctly assuming that Maguire would win and go out drinking to celebrate. However, Raffles faints before he can tell Bunny over the phone the nature of the trap was that has indeed caught him.

Horrified, Bunny rushes to Maguire's house in Half-moon Street, and rings repeatedly, but to no answer. Then, Maguire, his secretary, and his lady friend arrive in a carriage. Bunny appeases Maguire's suspicions by identifying himself as Raffles's friend, come to visit. They enter the house, and discover a disguised Raffles unconscious on the floor. Maguire, pleased to have caught a thief, reveals the nature of the trap was that caught the burglar: a silver-labelled bottle of whisky, drugged and left out for thieves. The secretary finds Raffles's bag of loot under a table, which holds Maguire's statues, infuriating Maguire. The secretary also notes that the telephone has been used, and suggests that they make inquiries as to who was called. Bunny says that it was he whom the thief called, and that the thief had pretended to be Raffles inviting him to Maguire's house.

"Bunny!" he yawned, and nothing more until his position came back to him. "So you came to me," he went on, in a tone that thrilled me with its affectionate appreciation, "as I knew you would! Have they turned up yet? They will any minute, you know; there’s not one to lose."

— Raffles, before he sees that his pursuers have been drugged

The other three drink from a safe whisky bottle and, before Bunny can drink, fall unconscious. Amazed, Bunny wakes Raffles, who is glad to see him, and also delighted that his scheme worked: before fainting, Raffles had moved the silver label from the drugged whisky bottle to the safe one. Though there is still the question of explaining the telephone call, Bunny agrees to maintain his innocence by pretending to be unconscious, and then calling the police, while Raffles escapes with the loot.

After fulfilling his grim task, Bunny returns to his own flat, only to find it has been burgled in his absence. Suspecting Raffles, he goes to the Albany for an explanation. Raffles cheerfully tells him that the police will now blame the telephone call on the unknown burglar's scheme of drawing Bunny from his rooms, in order to burgle them.

== Adaptations ==
=== Television ===
The story was adapted as the seventh episode of the Raffles television series, with Anthony Valentine as A. J. Raffles and Christopher Strauli as Bunny Manders. The episode, titled "A Trap to Catch a Cracksman", first aired on 8 April 1977.

=== Radio ===
BBC Radio adapted the story into the tenth episode of its Raffles radio drama, "A Trap to Catch a Cracksman", which first aired on 29 June 1988. The drama features Jeremy Clyde as Raffles and Michael Cochrane as Bunny. The episode largely follows the plot of the original story, with minor changes:

- In the drama, Maguire's astute secretary is replaced by two simple-minded lackeys named Cruncher and Hambone, and the unnamed lady friend acquires the name Ruby.
- In the original story, Bunny only pretends to have been drugged, whereas in the drama Raffles surreptitiously drugs Bunny's drink.
- In the drama only, Inspector Mackenzie is among the police that come to Maguire's house.
