= The Spoils of Sacrilege =

- Short story by E. W. Hornung
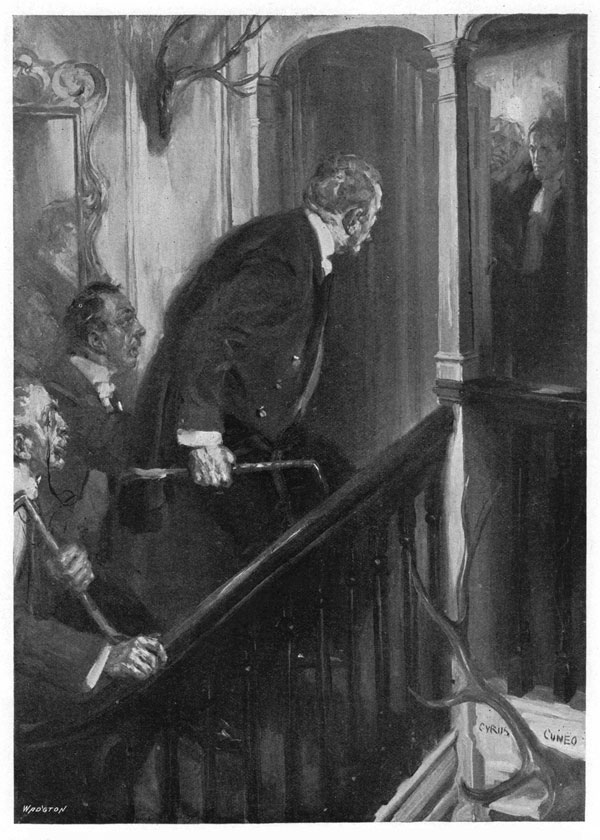
- 1905 Pall Mall illustration by Cyrus Cuneo
- Country: United Kingdom
- Language: English
- Genre(s): Crime fiction

Publication
- Publisher: Pall Mall Magazine
- Media type: Print (Magazine)
- Publication date: August 1905

Chronology
- Series: A. J. Raffles
A Trap to Catch a Cracksman	The Raffles Relics

"The Spoils of Sacrilege" is a short story by E. W. Hornung, and features the gentleman thief A. J. Raffles, and his companion and biographer, Bunny Manders. The story was published in August 1905 by Pall Mall Magazine in London. The story was also included as the seventh story in the collection A Thief in the Night, published by Chatto & Windus in London, and Charles Scribner's Sons in New York, both in 1905.

== Plot ==
Bunny, wanting to demonstrate his own worthiness to Raffles, proposes they burgle his childhood home, now owned by a rich man named Guillemard who has altered the property to accommodate stables of horses, in Horsham. Bunny visits old friends in order to take photographs of the place and show them to Raffles. Bunny suggests they try for Guillemard's bedroom on the night when Guillemard will celebrate a horse race by hosting a dinner-party. Raffles prepares himself and his tools for the job, but on the understanding that Bunny will lead.

On the night of the dinner-party, Raffles and Bunny meet near the house. They sneak through the garden, and observe that all the house's inhabitants are in the dining room. They use Raffles's rope-ladder to ascend to the balcony of Bunny's old room, and proceed to the main bedroom. Raffles jams the door with wedge and gimlet, and Bunny draws the bolt on the connected dressing room's outer door. Bunny lowers the rope-ladder from the bedroom window, to prepare a way of escape. Raffles rifles the bedroom, but finds nothing of value.

In the dressing room, Raffles is encouraged by the presence of the door's bolt. While he jimmies open a chest, Bunny wanders back to the bedroom, in time to see the rope-ladder be removed from below. Alarmed, Bunny retreats and tells Raffles. They pocket some jewel cases, and Raffles follows Bunny out the bedroom door. They are spotted by Guillemard and other men climbing the stairs. Raffles and Bunny hurry through the hallway and upstairs, into a room underneath the house's tower. They climb the stepladder and shut the trapdoor, hitting Guillemard.

They stand on the trapdoor until Raffles screws it closed with gimlets. Through the tower's one window with a view of the house's roof, they see a man climbing through a skylight. Raffles fires his revolver to scare the man off. With no other course, Raffles shimmies down the perilously thin wire of a lightning rod, and Bunny follows. They descend safely to ground and take shelter in a small boathouse on a tiny lake in the backyard, hoping the place will be overlooked by their pursuers.

Soon, however, they realize that their pursuers have inexplicably given up the chase. Wordlessly, Raffles creeps away, but doesn't return. Bunny waits anxiously for hours, until Raffles returns with stolen riding-clothes. They leave, taking a train and several cabs home.

"Sorry I've been so long, Bunny, but we should never have got away as we were; this riding-suit makes a new man of me, on top of my own, and here's a youth's kit that should do you down to the ground."

— Raffles returns after his second, solitary break-in

At the Albany, after Raffles says that the jewel cases he took were unfortunately empty, Bunny admits that his own were full, but that he left them in the tower out of guilt for robbing his childhood home. Yet Raffles declares that he had seen the house's inhabitants gloating merrily over Bunny's forfeited plunder. Raffles shows the jewelry to Bunny. He promises to relay to Bunny the full story of his second break-in at a Turkish bath.

== Adaptations ==
The story was adapted as the third episode of the Raffles television series, with Anthony Valentine as A. J. Raffles and Christopher Strauli as Bunny Manders. The episode, titled "Spoils of Sacrilege", first aired on 11 March 1977.

BBC Radio did not adapt "The Spoils of Sacrilege" for an episode as part of its series of adaptations for the Raffles stories.
