= Raffles (radio series) =

- Cover of Raffles: Series 1 & 2
- Genre: Radio drama
- Country of origin: United Kingdom
- Language: English
- Home station: BBC Radio 4
- Starring: Jeremy Clyde; Michael Cochrane
- Original release: 20 October 1985 – 17 January 1993
- No. of series: 3
- No. of episodes: 19

Raffles is a British radio programme including eighteen episodes that first aired on BBC Radio 4 from 1985 to 1992, and an additional radio play that aired in 1993 on the BBC World Service. The series was directed by Gordon House and was based on the A. J. Raffles stories (first published 1898–1909) by author E. W. Hornung.

The series starred Jeremy Clyde as fictional gentleman thief A. J. Raffles, and Michael Cochrane as Raffles's companion Bunny Manders.

Raffles is occasionally rebroadcast on radio by the BBC and has been released on home audio.

== Background and production ==
The series was a BBC Radio 4 and BBC World Service co-production. The first two series were adapted from E. W. Hornung's stories by David Buck, and the last series was adapted by Olwen Wymark. The director was Gordon House, and the signature tune was composed by Jim Parker. Jeremy Clyde played A. J. Raffles, and Michael Cochrane played Bunny Manders. Henry Stamper played a major recurring character, police detective Inspector Mackenzie.

Jeremy Clyde and Michael Cochrane had previously portrayed Raffles and Bunny respectively in the first episode of the 1978 BBC One television series Crime Writers, a documentary series about the history of crime fiction. In the same episode, Clyde and Cochrane also portrayed characters that inspired the creation of Raffles and Bunny, Sherlock Holmes and Dr. Watson, as well as the fictional detective C. Auguste Dupin and Dupin's unnamed companion.

Clyde and Cochrane had appeared together in the 1982 three part radio drama The Riddle of the Sands. Adapted by Colin Davis and Directed by Gordon House it was broadcast by BBC World Service January 1982 and repeated on Radio 4 Extra in January 2026.

After playing Raffles and Bunny in eighteen episodes on BBC Radio 4 between 1985 and 1992, all adapted from Hornung's stories, Clyde and Cochrane reprised their roles for the radio dramatisation of Graham Greene's play The Return of A. J. Raffles, which aired on the BBC World Service on 17 January 1993. The third series of Raffles had also been broadcast on the BBC World Service from 10 December 1992 though 14 January 1993. Henry Stamper reprised his role as Inspector Mackenzie for the 1993 radio play. Gordon House, who directed the Raffles series, also adapted and directed the production, and it used the Raffles series theme music composed by Jim Parker.

== Cast ==
=== Main ===
- Jeremy Clyde as A. J. Raffles, a gentleman thief and cricketer
- Michael Cochrane as Bunny Manders, Raffles's companion

=== Recurring ===
- Henry Stamper as Inspector Mackenzie, a detective from Scotland Yard
- Ron Pember as Crawshay, a rival working-class thief (Series 1)
- Gordon Reid as Dr Theobald, a physician in Earl's Court, London (Series 3)
- John Hartley as Mr Maturin, an alter ego of Raffles (Series 3)
- Gudrun Ure as Mrs Fisher, a landlady in Ham Common (Series 3)

== Episodes ==
Three series were aired with six 30-minute episodes each. An additional 60-minute radio play was broadcast in 1993, and was included in the BBC's home audio release of the third series.

=== Series 1 ===
Episode	Title	First broadcast	Adapted from	Main additional cast
1	"The Ides of March"	20 October 1985	"The Ides of March"	James Dykes as Young Bunny, George Parsons as Lord Upton
2	"Gentlemen and Players"	27 October 1985	"Gentlemen and Players"	Henry Stamper as Inspector Mackenzie, Ron Pember as Crawshay, David Garth as Lord Amersteth
3	"A Costume Piece"	3 November 1985	"A Costume Piece"	Geoffrey Matthews as Reuben Rosenthall, John Hollis as 'Slammer' Purvis
4	"Nine Points of the Law"	10 November 1985	"Nine Points of the Law"	David Buck as Addenbrooke, Nigel Graham as Craggs
5	"Wilful Murder or The Return Match"	17 November 1985	"Wilful Murder" and "The Return Match"	Henry Stamper as Inspector Mackenzie, Ron Pember as Crawshay
6	"The Chest of Silver"	24 November 1985	"The Chest of Silver"	Henry Stamper as Inspector Mackenzie, Brian Smith as the Clerk

=== Series 2 ===
Episode	Title	First broadcast	Adapted from	Main additional cast
1	"The Rest Cure"	1 June 1988	"The Rest Cure"	Christopher Benjamin as Colonel Crutchley, Laurence Payne as the Porter
2	"The Criminologists' Club"	8 June 1988	"The Criminologists' Club"	Henry Stamper as Inspector Mackenzie, David March as Lord Thornaby
3	"The Field of Philippi"	15 June 1988	"The Field of Philippi"	Bernard Brown as Sudborough, Michael Deacon as McNab/Porter
4	"A Bad Night"	22 June 1988	"A Bad Night"	Anton Lesser as Medlicott, John Baddeley as the Police Officer
5	"A Trap to Catch a Cracksman"	29 June 1988	"A Trap to Catch a Cracksman"	Henry Stamper as Inspector Mackenzie, Alan Tilvern as Maguire
6	"The Gift of the Emperor"	6 July 1988	"The Gift of the Emperor"	Henry Stamper as Inspector Mackenzie, Frederick Jaeger as Von Heumann, Zelah Clarke as Miss Werner

=== Series 3 ===
Episode	Title	First broadcast	Adapted from	Main additional cast
1	"No Sinecure"	30 July 1992	"No Sinecure" and "A Jubilee Present"	Gordon Reid as Dr Theobald, John Hartley as Mr Maturin
2	"To Catch a Thief"	6 August 1992	"To Catch a Thief"	Henry Stamper as Inspector Mackenzie, Gordon Reid as Dr Theobald, John Hartley as Mr Maturin
3	"An Old Flame"	13 August 1992	"An Old Flame"	Gordon Reid as Dr Theobald, John Hartley as Mr Maturin, Gudrun Ure as Mrs Fisher, Eleanor Bron as Jacques Saillard
4	"The Raffles Relics"	20 August 1992	"The Raffles Relics" and "The Wrong House"	Gudrun Ure as Mrs Fisher, Peter Forbes as Druce
5	"The Knees of the Gods"	27 August 1992	"The Knees of the Gods"	Gudrun Ure as Mrs Fisher, Seán Barrett as Connell, Peter Penry-Jones as the General
6	"The Last Word"	3 September 1992	"Out of Paradise" and "The Last Word"	Emily Richard as Sophie, Matthew Morgan as Alec
7	"The Return of A. J. Raffles"	17 January 1993	The Return of A. J. Raffles (by Graham Greene)	Henry Stamper as Inspector Mackenzie, Edward de Souza as Mr Portland (the Prince of Wales)

== Release ==
The series has been rebroadcast occasionally on BBC Radio 4 Extra since its original release.

The first two series of Raffles were released together digitally by BBC Worldwide and on CD by BBC Books in 2015. The third series was released in 2017. The release of the third series includes "The Return of A. J. Raffles" by Graham Greene.
