= A Bad Night =

- Short story by E. W. Hornung
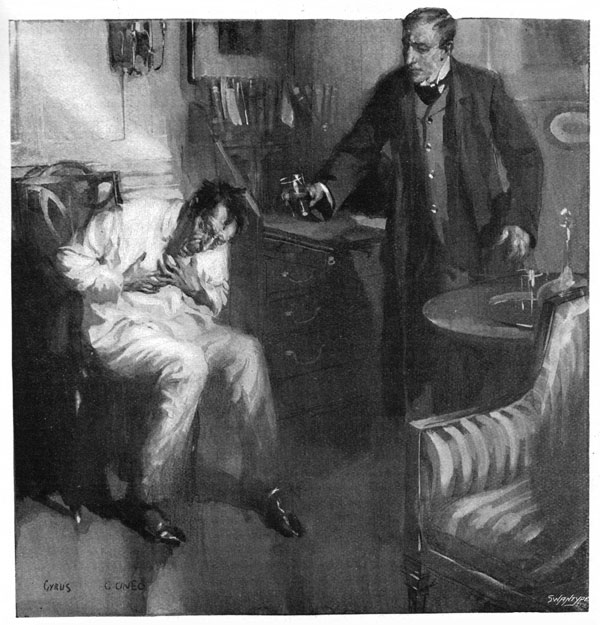
- 1905 Pall Mall illustration by Cyrus Cuneo
- Country: United Kingdom
- Language: English
- Genre(s): Crime fiction

Publication
- Publisher: Pall Mall Magazine
- Media type: Print (Magazine)
- Publication date: June 1905

Chronology
- Series: A. J. Raffles
The Criminologists' Club	A Trap to Catch a Cracksman

"A Bad Night" is a short story by E. W. Hornung, and features the gentleman thief A. J. Raffles, and his companion and biographer, Bunny Manders. The story was published in June 1905 by Pall Mall Magazine in London. The story was also included as the sixth story in the collection A Thief in the Night, published by Chatto & Windus in London, and Charles Scribner's Sons in New York, both in 1905.

== Plot ==
I saw his fears for me; and nothing could have made me more fearless for myself. Raffles had been wrong about me all these years; now was my chance to set him right.

— Bunny is ready to show his strength

Raffles plans to burgle the house on the banks of the Mole of a bride-to-be, which is presently so laden with wedding gifts that she has had the gifts insured. However, Raffles is selected to play for the English in the Second Test Match, the first day of which will be the day of the wedding, when her gifts will be vulnerable. Bunny insists on taking the burglary job himself, so that Raffles can be free to serve his country. Raffles is anxious, but Bunny is eager to prove himself.

The night of the wedding, Bunny sneaks to the house's garden. He stops to light a cigarette, merely to demonstrate his nerves. As Bunny finishes, a window opens overhead, and a wheezing voice accosts him. Bunny, relying on a story rehearsed with Raffles, pretends that he is from the insurance company. The young man at the window, who is the bride-to-be's asthmatic brother Mr. Medlicott, believes Bunny, and lets him into the house.

Bunny follows Medlicott, who struggles to return to a library upstairs. Though Medlicott is ailing, he is kind, and he and Bunny discuss cricket. Bunny begins reluctantly to sympathize with Medlicott, and helps to keep the man's asthma pacified. Suddenly Bunny hears a noise, and looks out the window to see there is a new light from downstairs. When Bunny decides to go downstairs and investigate, Medlicott is impressed and offers his concealed revolver to Bunny, but Bunny prefers to use the life preserver he has brought.

Downstairs, Bunny finds and quickly knocks out the burglar, only to realize afterward in anguish and bitterness that it is Raffles in disguise. Medlicott joins Bunny, and Bunny sends Medlicott to fetch the policeman on his beat outside. Raffles rises, and expresses his irritation. Together they escape the house. Raffles changes their clothes using garments he has hidden in some bushes, and they catch a train. Bunny only learns later that Medlicott had been unable to reach the policeman, and eventually had to struggle home.

Bunny regrets having wronged both Raffles and Medlicott. Raffles, however, apologizes himself, and explains: rain had cut the day's cricket short, and he had been so anxious about Bunny that he had come to keep an eye on Bunny. He had followed Bunny the entire time, and had admired Bunny's performance throughout. Moreover, Raffles was able to take some jewellery from the collection of wedding presents.

== Adaptations ==
=== Television ===
The story was adapted into the ninth episode of the Raffles television series, with Anthony Valentine as A. J. Raffles and Christopher Strauli as Bunny Manders. The episode, titled "A Bad Night", first aired on 22 April 1977.

=== Radio ===
BBC Radio adapted the story into the tenth episode of its Raffles radio drama, "A Bad Night", which first aired on 22 June 1988. The drama features Jeremy Clyde as Raffles and Michael Cochrane as Bunny. The episode follows the plot of the original story, with some changes:

- In the drama, Raffles goes after this house as an act of revenge against young Medlicott's prosperous father, for the sake of the man's orphaned and financially ruined nephew, Spadger, who killed himself after his appeal for help from his rich uncle fell on deaf ears.
- In the drama, rather than explain all to Bunny in the train afterwards, Raffles sleeps nearly all the way back to the cricket match in Trafford, thereby recovering well enough from Bunny's blow to play well against the Australians the next day. He explains his actions to Bunny in the Albany later.
