= The Raffles Relics =

- Short story by E. W. Hornung
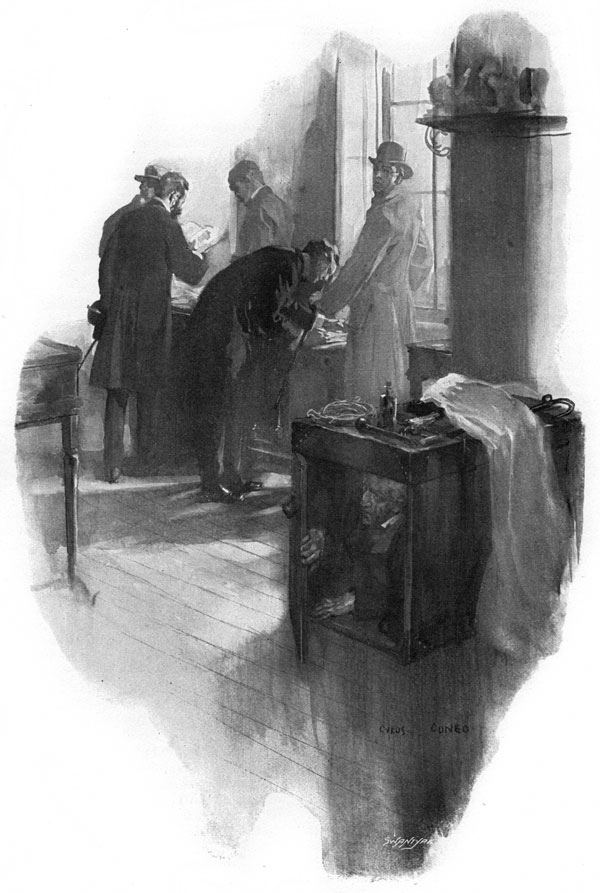
- 1905 Pall Mall illustration by Cyrus Cuneo
- Country: United Kingdom
- Language: English
- Genre(s): Crime fiction

Publication
- Publisher: Pall Mall Magazine
- Media type: Print (Magazine)
- Publication date: September 1905

Chronology
- Series: A. J. Raffles
The Spoils of Sacrilege	The Last Word

"The Raffles Relics" is a short story by E. W. Hornung, and features the gentleman thief A. J. Raffles, and his companion and biographer, Bunny Manders. The story was published in September 1905 by Pall Mall Magazine in London. The story was also included as the eighth story in the collection A Thief in the Night, published by Chatto & Windus in London, and Charles Scribner's Sons in New York, both in 1905.

== Plot ==
It is December 1899, at which time the reputations of Raffles and Bunny are ruined and they are secretly living in Ham Common. They read in a magazine about the so-called Raffles Relics on display at the Black Museum at New Scotland Yard. Excited, Raffles passive-aggressively persuades Bunny, now a journalist, to get a journalist's pass for two to visit the museum.

They enter the museum without incident. An enthusiastic young clerk arrives to give them a tour, though he is less knowledgeable than Raffles and Bunny on the museum's inventory, which includes the infamous cigarette box of two criminals who were never caught. Eventually, the clerk shows them the Raffles Relics, taken from Raffles's Albany rooms after his apparent death. He points out several objects, including Raffles's old revolver, which Raffles had once fired at a man on a roof and had once hidden a pearl inside of, the rope-ladder and telescope walking-stick he used at the house of Lord Thornaby, the velvet bag whose use is unknown, the life-preserver that Bunny had once hit Raffles with, and Raffles's chest. The clerk speaks poorly of Raffles's partner, to Bunny's chagrin.

A well-known detective and two other guests also browse the museum. Raffles, wary of the detective, tells Bunny to hide his face in some photographs; Bunny does so, until he realizes that Raffles has vanished. Irritated, he nonetheless tells the clerk that Raffles had to catch a train. Bunny lingers until the detective's party leaves, then tips the clerk and leaves. He searches for Raffles for four hours, in vain. At home, he anxiously waits hours for Raffles.

“A lot may happen in three or four weeks; and what should you say if this turned out to be the last as well as the least of all my crimes? I must own that it seems to me their natural and fitting end, though I might have stopped more characteristically than with a mere crime of sentiment."

— Raffles to Bunny, after stealing the Relics

Bunny wakes abruptly in the morning to see Raffles, and the entire collection of Raffles Relics, except for the chest. Raffles had hid himself in the chest, using its secret side door. He had replaced his relics with items from other collections, so that the robbery will not be noticed for weeks. Raffles wonders about putting his relics to use again, but also speaks prophetically about the competing excitement that the ongoing war might soon offer them.

== Adaptations ==
BBC Radio adapted the story into the first half of the sixteenth episode of its Raffles radio drama, "The Raffles Relics", which first aired on 20 August 1992. The drama features Jeremy Clyde as Raffles and Michael Cochrane as Bunny. The episode faithfully follows the plot of the original story, with a minor change:

- In the drama, the stealing of the Raffles Relics is their first Ham Common crime, rather than their last. In the episode, Raffles and Bunny use the stolen items to carry out the burglary in "The Wrong House".
