= The Wrong House =

- Short story by E. W. Hornung
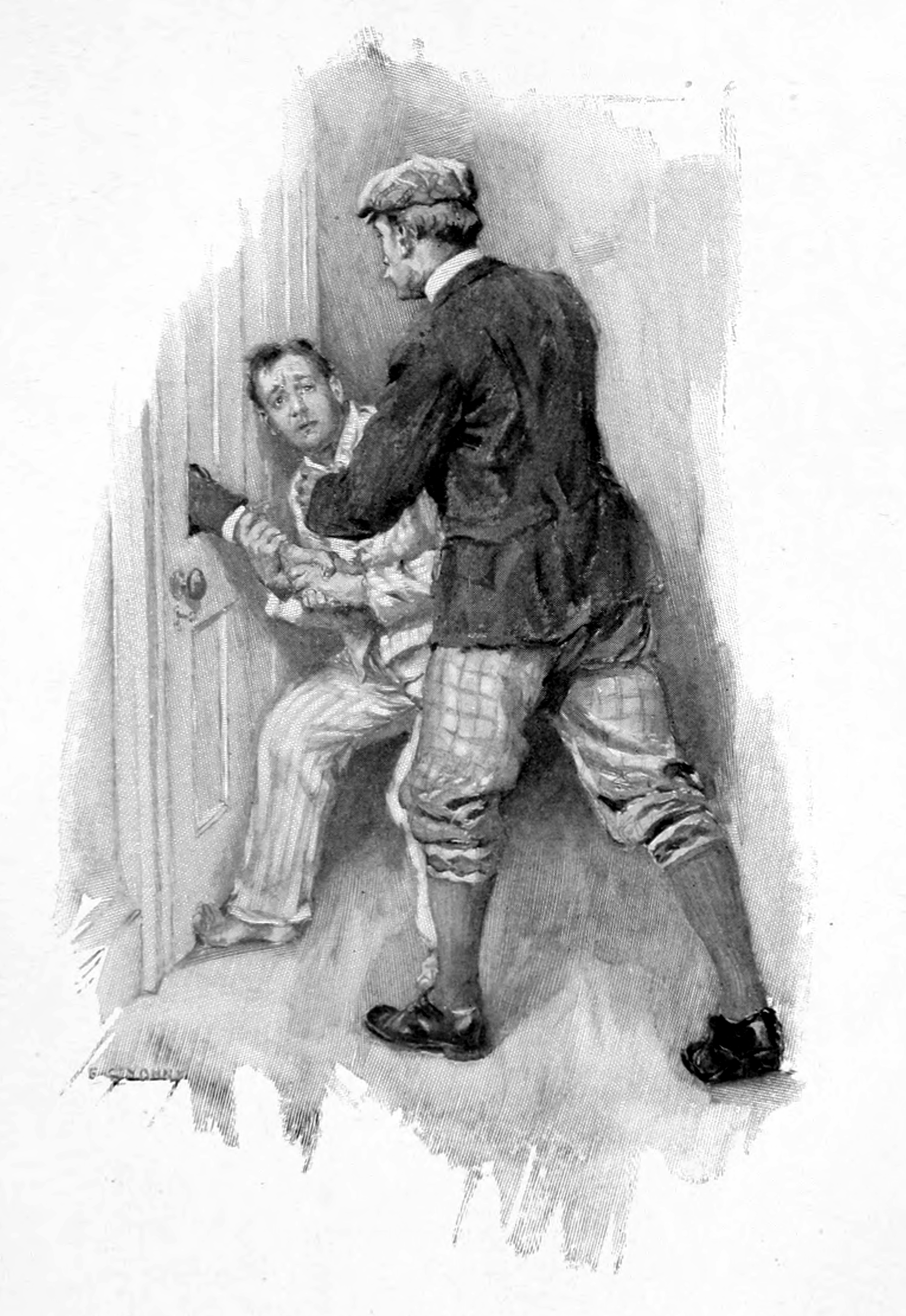
- 1906 illustration by F. C. Yohn
- Country: United Kingdom
- Language: English
- Genre(s): Crime fiction

Publication
- Publisher: Charles Scribner's Sons
- Media type: Print (Magazine)
- Publication date: September 1901

Chronology
- Series: A. J. Raffles
An Old Flame	The Knees of the Gods

"The Wrong House" is a short story by E. W. Hornung, and features the gentleman thief A. J. Raffles, and his companion and biographer, Bunny Manders. The story was first published in Scribner's Magazine in September 1901. The story was also included as the seventh story in the collection The Black Mask, published by Grant Richards in London, and Charles Scribner's Sons in New York, both in 1901.

== Plot ==
Raffles is now living with Bunny in Ham Common as Bunny's colonial brother, Ralph. Raffles and Bunny occasionally commit burglaries at night, using their bicycles. Raffles becomes a favorite of their unsuspecting landlady.

For their next haul, Raffles and Bunny pick out a stockbroker's house. At night, they approach with their bicycles, unscrew the bars of the pantry window, and enter. Bunny brings an electric torch, outfitted by Raffles with shades to act as a dark lantern. Using a knife, Raffles cuts a hole through a panel in a door, in order to try to turn the key that is in the lock on the other side. When Raffles reaches through, however, his hand is suddenly grabbed by some boys.

Yes, I would get out, but only to come in again, for it was my turn—mine—not his. Would Raffles leave me held by a hand through a hole in a door? What he would have done in my place was the thing for me to do now.

— Bunny resolves to save Raffles

Raffles and Bunny, horrified, realize that they have not broken into the house of the stockbroker, as intended, but the neighboring house, occupied by an army-trainer and his students. Raffles, caught, bids Bunny to leave and save himself. Bunny does leave, but only to reenter the house from the front. He convinces the boys that he saw Raffles's accomplice escape. The boys not holding Raffles leave to give chase. Abruptly, Bunny grabs the remaining one, Beefy, in a chokehold, forcing him to release Raffles. Raffles lets himself in by turning the key in the lock. He chloroforms Beefy and locks him in the pantry.

They are soon joined by the awakened army instructor, and rejoined by the other boys. All of them suspect Bunny and Raffles. To explain himself, Bunny pretends to have gone outside to fetch his friend, Raffles, only to find Beefy gone upon returning. Raffles quickly adds that they should follow the burglars on their bikes, and leads Bunny outside. They are soon chased after by the boys and instructor. They ride their bicycles away, though Bunny accidentally chooses a difficult uphill path, and their escape is narrow. When they are safely at home, Raffles warmly congratulates Bunny for his quick thinking.

== Adaptations ==
=== Television ===
Part of the story was adapted into the third episode of the Raffles television series, with Anthony Valentine as A. J. Raffles and Christopher Strauli as Bunny Manders. The episode, titled "The Spoils of Sacrilege", first aired on 11 March 1977.

=== Radio ===
BBC Radio adapted the story into the second half of the sixteenth episode of its Raffles radio drama, "The Raffles Relics", which first aired on 20 August 1992. The drama features Jeremy Clyde as Raffles and Michael Cochrane as Bunny. The episode faithfully follows the plot of the original story, with minor changes:

- In the episode, the events of the original story follow the events of "The Raffles Relics", rather than precede them. At the end of the drama, Raffles even adds that their black masks, which Bunny had to remove from their faces before they were seen by the boys, will serve as a start to a new collection, the Bunny Manders Relics.
- In the drama, instead of proposing to chase the burglars, Raffles leads Bunny outside on the pretense of bringing their bicycles inside, to protect them from the burglars.
- The landlady, unnamed in the original stories, is named Mrs Fisher in the radio play.
