= The Inn of the Two Witches =

- Short story by Joseph Conrad
- Country: United Kingdom
- Language: English

Publication
- Published in: The Pall Mall Magazine
- Publication date: March 1913

"The Inn of the Two Witches" is a work of short fiction by Joseph Conrad, first published in The Pall Mall Magazine in March 1913. The story was collected in Within the Tides (1915) published by J. M. Dent and Sons.

== Plot ==
The story is set during the Spanish Peninsular War, a military theater of the Napoleonic Wars. A British naval officer goes in search of his henchman who has disappeared. Spending the night at an isolated inn, the officer narrowly escapes death. The four-poster bed he sleeps in is an ingenious device fitted with a descending canopy that serves to suffocate its slumbering victims. He narrowly escapes the fate of his servant.

== Critical assessment ==
Biographer Jocelyn Baines provides no analysis of "The Inn of the Two Witches", merely describing it as "a very un-typical potboiler" and "a story more suitable for boys than for adults." Literary critic Laurence Graver, after providing a thumbnail sketch of the story, adds that the work "does not require discussion."

Graver offers these remarks concerning Conrad's final efforts as a writer of short fiction:

Few writers capable of achieving "Heart of Darkness" ever descended to the dismal fabrication of "The Inn of the Two Witches"...perhaps the most painful part of tracing Conrad's career as a story writer is to watched an elegant, aristocratic man of genius try, from necessity, to learn the formulaic secrets of commercial fiction - and fail.

== Sources ==
- Baines, Jocelyn. 1960. Joseph Conrad: A Critical Biography, McGraw-Hill Book Company, New York. ISBN 978-0297167556
- Graver, Laurence. 1969. Conrad's Short Fiction. University of California Press, Berkeley, California. ISBN 0-520-00513-9
