= Raffles (TV series) =

1977 British television series

- Based on: A. J. Raffles stories by E. W. Hornung
- Screenplay by: Philip Mackie
- Starring: Anthony Valentine; Christopher Strauli; Victor Brooks; Victor Carin; Trevor Ray; Andrew Jackson; James Maxwell; Robert Hardy; John Savident; Peter Sallis
- Theme music composer: Anthony Isaac
- Country of origin: United Kingdom
- Original language: English
- No. of episodes: 13 (and 1 pilot)

Production
- Running time: 50 minutes
- Production company: Yorkshire Television

Original release
- Network: ITV
- Release: 10 September 1975 – 20 May 1977

Raffles is a 1977 television series adapted from the A. J. Raffles stories by E. W. Hornung. The stories were adapted by Philip Mackie.

Set in Victorian era London, the series features the criminal adventures of gentleman thief A. J. Raffles, a renowned cricketer, and his friend, the eager but naive Bunny Manders, as they test their skills in relieving the wealthy of their valuables whilst avoiding detection, especially from Inspector Mackenzie.

The episodes were largely faithful adaptations of the stories in the books, though occasionally two stories would be merged to create one episode, such as "The Gold Cup", which featured elements from two short stories, "A Jubilee Present" and "The Criminologist's Club". The series has been released on DVD.

== Regular cast ==
- Anthony Valentine as A. J. Raffles, a clever and daring gentleman who is a well-known cricketer and also secretly an expert burglar
- Christopher Strauli as Bunny Manders, Raffles's loyal friend and accomplice, who is more idealistic and naive than Raffles
- Victor Carin as Inspector Mackenzie, a diligent Scottish detective from Scotland Yard who is suspicious of Raffles
- Victor Brooks as the porter at the Albany, the prestigious address where Raffles lives

== Production ==
The 1975 pilot was produced by Peter Willes, and the producer of the 1977 series was Jacky Stoller. The executive producer of the series was David Cunliffe and the theme music was by Anthony Isaac. The production company was Yorkshire Television. Screenwriter Philip Mackie adapted the episodes from the A. J. Raffles stories of author E. W. Hornung.

Filming for the full series took place during the summer of 1976, which saw Britain experiencing a prolonged heatwave. Actors remembered how hot it was filming outdoor scenes, especially wearing their heavy Victorian costumes and stiff collars.

The Albany refused to give Yorkshire Television permission to film on their grounds, so the production team instead built their own exterior. The television series took six months to film and was shot on a mixture of video and film.

Some episodes were released on VHS. The series was later released on DVD.

== Episodes ==
=== Pilot (1975) ===
Title	Original release date
"The Amateur Cracksman"	10 September 1975
In this television pilot episode, Raffles is invited to play cricket for a wealthy lord's son's cricket team at Milchester Abbey. Raffles conspires to use the invitation as an opportunity to bring Bunny along and burgle the house. Their plans are complicated, however, when Raffles and Bunny learn that an undercover Scotland Yard detective is hunting for burglars at Milchester. This episode is adapted from the short stories "Gentlemen and Players" and "The Return Match". Additional cast: James Maxwell as Inspector Mackenzie (only in this pilot episode), John Junkin as Crawshay, Michael Barrington as the Earl of Milchester, Osmund Bullock as Viscount Crowley, Philip Voss as Albany Manager and Eric Francis as Newsvendor. The director was Christopher Hodson.

=== Season 1 (1977) ===
No.	Title	Original release date
1	"The First Step"	25 February 1977
Bunny meets his old schoolmate Raffles, now a nationally famous cricketer, for the first time in many years at Raffles' flat at the Albany. However, Bunny is drawn into a Baccarat game by Raffles' other guests, and loses. After writing bad cheques to cover his losses, a desperate Bunny turns to Raffles for help. Raffles, who is himself hard-up, surprises Bunny by proposing that they burgle the wealthy family of one of the other guests, Alick Carruthers (played by Jeremy Clyde, who would later portray Raffles in the BBC radio series Raffles). This episode is adapted from the first half of the short story "The Ides of March", and from elements of "Out of Paradise" and "A Jubilee Present". The title is a reference to the name of the unadapted story "Le Premier Pas". Additional cast: Thorley Walters as Lord Lochmaben, Jeremy Clyde as Alick Carruthers, Susan Skipper as Maud, David Firth as Tremayne, Sally Grace as Polly and Godfrey James as Sgt. Broom. The director was Christopher Hodson. Anthony Valentine met his future wife Susan Skipper during the recording of this episode. Susan was already married to John Skipper, but divorced in the late seventies. She married Anthony in 1982, and remained married to him until his death in 2015.
2	"A Costume Piece"	4 March 1977
Raffles is intrigued when his club's guest of honour, a brutish South African millionaire, dares the club members to try to steal his diamond stud and ring. With Bunny's help and with a few disguises, Raffles undertakes the challenge of stealing the diamonds, but it becomes a matter of life or death when their well-laid plans go terribly awry. This episode is adapted from the short story "A Costume Piece". Additional cast: Alfred Marks as Reuben Rosenthall, Brian Glover as Billy Purvis, Jill Gascoine as Dolly, and Lesley Daine as Maisie. The director was Christopher Hodson.
3	"The Spoils of Sacrilege"	11 March 1977
Eager to prove his worth in his criminal partnership with Raffles, Bunny takes it upon himself to plan their next burglary of a well-to-do house that was once his childhood home. To win over Raffles, Bunny contrives for him to catch a glimpse of the diamond necklace worn by the lady of the house, at a party. Tempted by the necklace, Raffles agrees to play along, and Bunny takes the lead. But when disaster strikes, it falls to Raffles to extricate them both from ruin. This episode is adapted from the short story "The Spoils of Sacrilege", with elements of "The Wrong House". Additional cast: William Mervyn as Osborne, Barbara Hicks as Lady Osborne, and Sally Osborn as Lady Adela. The director was Christopher Hodson.
4	"The Gold Cup"	18 March 1977
During the Queen's jubilee, Raffles and Bunny steal the Royal Gold Cup from the British Museum while in disguise. However, the heist earns the attention of a gentlemen club of criminology enthusiasts, who invite Raffles and Bunny to dinner in order to prove their suspicions. This episode is adapted from the short stories "A Jubilee Present" and "The Criminologists' Club". Additional cast: Tony Britton as Lord Thornaby, Peter Sallis as Kingsmill, Diana Weston as Lady Alice, Michael Nightingale as Butler and George Tovey as Cabbie. The director was David Cunliffe.
5	"The Chest of Silver"	25 March 1977
Raffles is going away to Scotland for a week to practice his accent while having electric lights and a telephone installed in his room. With respect to the chest of stolen silver lying in his room, Raffles asks Bunny to store it his bank until Raffles's return. However, when Bunny's bank later becomes the site of a burglary, Bunny fears that their old rival, Crawshay, has targeted the chest of silver. This episode is adapted from the short story "The Chest of Silver". Additional cast: Geoffrey Hutchings as the bank clerk, Victor Carin as Inspector Mackenzie, John Ringham as First Commissionaire, James Murray as Policeman, Trevor Ray as Bunny’s porter and Johnnie Wade as Growler Driver. The director was Alan Gibson.
6	"The Last Laugh"	1 April 1977
While enjoying a house party with Bunny, Raffles becomes infatuated with the house jewels, as well as with a mysterious Italian maid who works at the house. In his quest to steal a ring from the house, Raffles must avoid the close scrutiny of another party guest, Inspector Mackenzie. Later, in his quest to save the Italian maid from a forced marriage and send her to safety in America, Raffles must extract her from the clutches of the head of the Camorra. This episode is loosely adapted from the short story "The Last Laugh". Additional cast: Robert Lang as Count Corbucci, Marina Sirtis as Faustina, Victor Carin as Inspector Mackenzie and Cyril Shaps as Pinelli. The director was Jim Goddard.
7	"A Trap to Catch a Cracksman"	8 April 1977
At a party thrown by a sporting club, Raffles and Bunny meet Barney MacGuire, an ill-mannered boxing champion from America. MacGuire not only shows off his extravagant boxing trophies to them, but also boasts that he has a secret trap guaranteed to catch any thief who tries to steal them. Raffles takes the boast as a challenge, and decides to make the attempt alone. However, in the middle of the night of Raffles's burglary attempt, Bunny receives a cryptic telephone call from Raffles, telling Bunny that he has been caught. This episode is adapted from the short story "A Trap to Catch a Cracksman". Additional cast: Christopher Malcolm as Barney Maquire, John Stratton as Sergeant Thompson and Trevor Ray as Bunny’s porter. The director was John Davies.
8	"To Catch a Thief"	15 April 1977
Although Inspector Mackenzie suspects that Raffles is the culprit behind a recent string of unsolved society burglaries, Raffles is innocent. Raffles himself deduces that the real culprit is the respectable gentleman Lord Ernest Belville. Raffles learns about Belville, so that he and Bunny can make an attempt to steal Belville's haul for themselves. During their search of Belville's flat, however, Raffles and Bunny are caught in the act by the man himself. This episode is adapted from the short story "To Catch a Thief". Additional cast: Robert Hardy as Lord Ernest Belville, Victor Carin as Inspector Mackenzie and John Flint as Policeman. The director was Christopher Hodson.
9	"A Bad Night"	22 April 1977
Raffles is interested in some wedding presents which will be at a country house in East Molesey, but he will be busy playing cricket at Old Trafford the day the presents will be on display, so Bunny volunteers to take on the task of stealing them alone. However, Bunny faces an unexpected problem as soon as he arrives at the house. This episode is adapted from the short story "A Bad Night". Additional cast: Jan Francis as Netje, Norman Bird as Sergeant Holly and Dennis Chinnery as Waiter. The director was Christopher Hodson.
10	"Mr. Justice Raffles"	29 April 1977
Raffles and Bunny fail to score during a burglary attempt on an unscrupulous moneylender named Brigstock, while staying at the same hotel. Later, a friend of Raffles named Teddy Garland, who has been roped into massive debt by Brigstock, comes to Raffles for help. For Teddy and for his fiancée, Camilla Belsize, Raffles comes up with a complicated plan to save Teddy from ruin, with Bunny's help. This episode is adapted from the novel Mr. Justice Raffles. Additional cast: John Savident as Brigstock, Lynette Davies as Lady Camilla Belsize, Charles Dance as Teddy Garland, Maurice Bush as 1st Heavy and Steve Emerson as 2nd Heavy. The director was Christopher Hodson.
11	"Home Affairs"	6 May 1977
Irritated by constant persecution from Inspector Mackenzie and by the harsh punishments for thieves being politically supported by the Home Secretary, Raffles decides to teach his enemies a lesson by going with Bunny to burgle the Home Secretary's house in Kensington Palace Gardens. The heist goes smoothly, until a mistake by Bunny lands him in trouble, and Raffles must contrive a way to use Inspector Mackenzie to save Bunny. This episode features an original plot. Additional cast: Graham Crowden as Sir Arthur Rumbold, Victor Carin as Inspector Mackenzie, Erin Geraghty as Jane, Claire Davenport as Lady Rumbold and Erik Chitty as Dodson. The director was Jim Goddard.
12	"The Gift of the Emperor"	13 May 1977
An agent from the Foreign Office tasks Raffles with stealing a pearl belonging to Kaiser Wilhelm, as an act of patriotism. Inspector Mackenzie, too, is keen on helping Raffles steal the pearl. Yet Raffles is determined to snatch the pearl the old-fashioned way: with no one's help but Bunny's, and for personal profit alone. This episode is loosely adapted from the short story "The Gift of the Emperor". Additional cast: John Carson as Carstairs, Hilary Gasson as Felicia, John Hallam as Von Heumann, Victor Carin as Inspector Mackenzie and Yuri Borienko as Rumpelmayer. The director was Jim Goddard.
13	"An Old Flame"	20 May 1977
While breaking into a random house in Kensington Gardens, Raffles is caught in the act by a married woman who was his former lover. She lets him go, and tries to rekindle their relationship. Her financially dependent husband, however, is eager to keep Raffles away from his wealthy wife by any means necessary. This episode is loosely adapted from the short story "An Old Flame". Additional cast: Gerald Flood as Lord Paulton, Caroline Blakiston as Lady Paulton, Victor Carin as Inspector Mackenzie, Gary Watson as Dr Addison, Maurice Quick as Pelham, Malcolm Rogers as Cabbie and Peter Spraggon as Police Constable. The director was Jim Goddard.

== Reception ==
In his book Raffles and His Creator, Peter Rowland praised the television series for its fidelity to Hornung's stories, stating that the adapter Philip Mackie kept as close as he could to the spirit and dialogue of the original stories. Rowland noted that, while the series simplified the Raffles saga by keeping A. J. Raffles a well-known cricketer living at the Albany (unlike in the original stories, in which Raffles's situation changes in the short story "The Gift of the Emperor"), the basic characters of Raffles and Bunny were brought more accurately to life than in any previous adaptation. Rowland also stated that Raffles had previously been portrayed with non-canonical features (for example, both David Niven and Ronald Colman portrayed Raffles with a moustache). Compared to previous actors, Anthony Valentine portrayed Raffles with an appearance closer to the slim, dark-haired, clean-shaven description of the original character, with Bunny Manders (Christopher Strauli) being fair-haired and appearing a few years younger than Raffles, as in the stories.

According to Rowland, the series was positively received by viewers and critics. David Pryce-Jones wrote in The Listener (3 March 1977): "Raffles has become a serial. In Anthony Valentine, what is more, Raffles has been splendidly personified, a lean, dark figure with a smile at once engaging and slightly saturnine. The eye is cold, the manner debonair. He looks as if he could well play cricket for England and would steal any tiara without compunction."

John Pinkney of The Age praised the series for its effective recreation of late‑Victorian atmosphere and its faithful engagement with Ernest Hornung's satirical tone. Pinkney noted that the series captured the contrast between Victorian moral strictness and the characters gentleman‑thief persona, commending the scripts and the performances of Anthony Valentine and Christopher Strauli. He also praised the series for its production and for its strong visual style.

Jon E. Lewis and Penny Stempel described Raffles as a "stylishly mounted" Edwardian tale of a "gentleman‑cracksman", noting its blend of charm, wit, and criminal mischief.

== Accolades ==
The series was nominated in 1978 for the BAFTA TV Awards for Best Costume Design (Brian Castle), Make-up (Phillippa Haigh), and VTR Editor (the Yorkshire TV Team).
