= A Thief in the Night (short story collection) =

1905 short story collection by E. W. Hornung

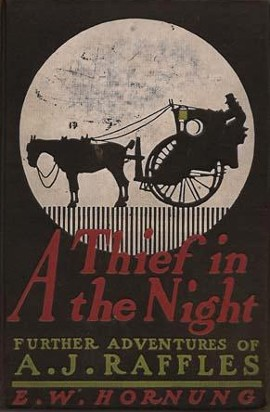
- First US edition
- Author: E.W. Hornung
- Language: English
- Series: A. J. Raffles
- Genre: Crime fiction
- Publisher: Chatto & Windus (UK); Scribner's (US)
- Publication date: 1905
- Publication place: United Kingdom
- Preceded by: The Black Mask
- Followed by: Mr. Justice Raffles

A Thief in the Night is a 1905 collection of short stories by E. W. Hornung. It was published in the UK by Chatto & Windus, London, and in the US by Scribner's, New York.

The stories feature Hornung's popular character A. J. Raffles. It was the third book in the series, and the final collection of short stories. In it, Raffles, a gentleman thief, commits a number of burglaries in late Victorian England.

A full-length Raffles novel, Mr. Justice Raffles, would follow in 1909.

== Overview ==
Chronicler and accomplice Bunny Manders narrates additional adventures which he had previously omitted, from various points in their criminal careers. All but the last two stories take place while A. J. Raffles and Bunny Manders are still respectable gentlemen and Raffles is still an amateur cricketer who lives in rooms at the Albany.

The two remaining stories take place after Raffles and Bunny become professional criminals of ruined reputations: the second last story follows after the events of "An Old Flame", and the final story takes place after the events of "The Knees of the Gods".

All stories are largely self-contained and independent, with the exception of the last story, which serves as an epilogue to events explored in the first story. Each story was first published in serial format, except for "The Last Word" which is a short epilogue to the events of "Out of Paradise".

== Contents ==
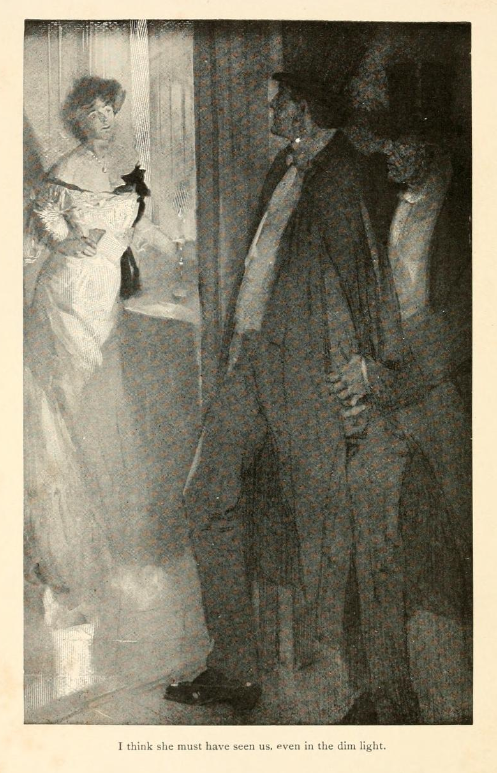
Bunny, Raffles, and Bunny's ex-fiancée, 1908 frontispiece by Cyrus Cuneo

1. "Out of Paradise" – Raffles proposes breaking into the house that once belonged to the rich uncle of Bunny's cherished ex-fiancée.
2. "The Chest of Silver" — While vacating his rooms to allow Scotland Yard to search them, Raffles entrusts Bunny to deposit a chest of Raffles's stolen silver at Bunny's bank.
3. "The Rest Cure" — To avoid Inspector Mackenzie, Raffles grows a beard and takes a quiet Rest Cure in the house of a prison warden, and he invites Bunny to join him.
4. "The Criminologists' Club" — Raffles and Bunny are invited to dine with four crime enthusiasts, who want to discuss crime in sport with the cricketer Raffles, but Bunny fears they suspect Raffles of being a thief.
5. "The Field of Philippi" — When Raffles and Bunny visit their old school, Raffles takes a position in a debate against a dogmatic old schoolmate.
6. "A Bad Night" — When Raffles has to give up a burglary job to play for the English in a Test match, Bunny is eager to prove that he can pull off the job himself.
7. "A Trap to Catch a Cracksman" — A wealthy and brutish boxer from the United States claims to have devised an ingenious trap to catch a burglar, and Raffles, enticed by the boxer's challenge, falls right into it.
8. "The Spoils of Sacrilege" — Wishing to take the lead in a burglary for once, Bunny proposes to Raffles that they rob the rich residents of Bunny's childhood home.
9. "The Raffles Relics" — While Raffles and Bunny are living in retirement in Ham Common, they learn about the Raffles Relics that are on display at the Black Museum at Scotland Yard, and decide to pay a visit.
10. "The Last Word" — After returning home from the war, Bunny runs into his ex-fiancée, who tells him a story of an unsung kindness Raffles once did for Bunny, and also that she would like to be Bunny's friend again. "The Last Word" is significantly shorter than the other Raffles stories and was not published previously in a magazine.
