= An Old Flame (short story) =

- Short story by E. W. Hornung
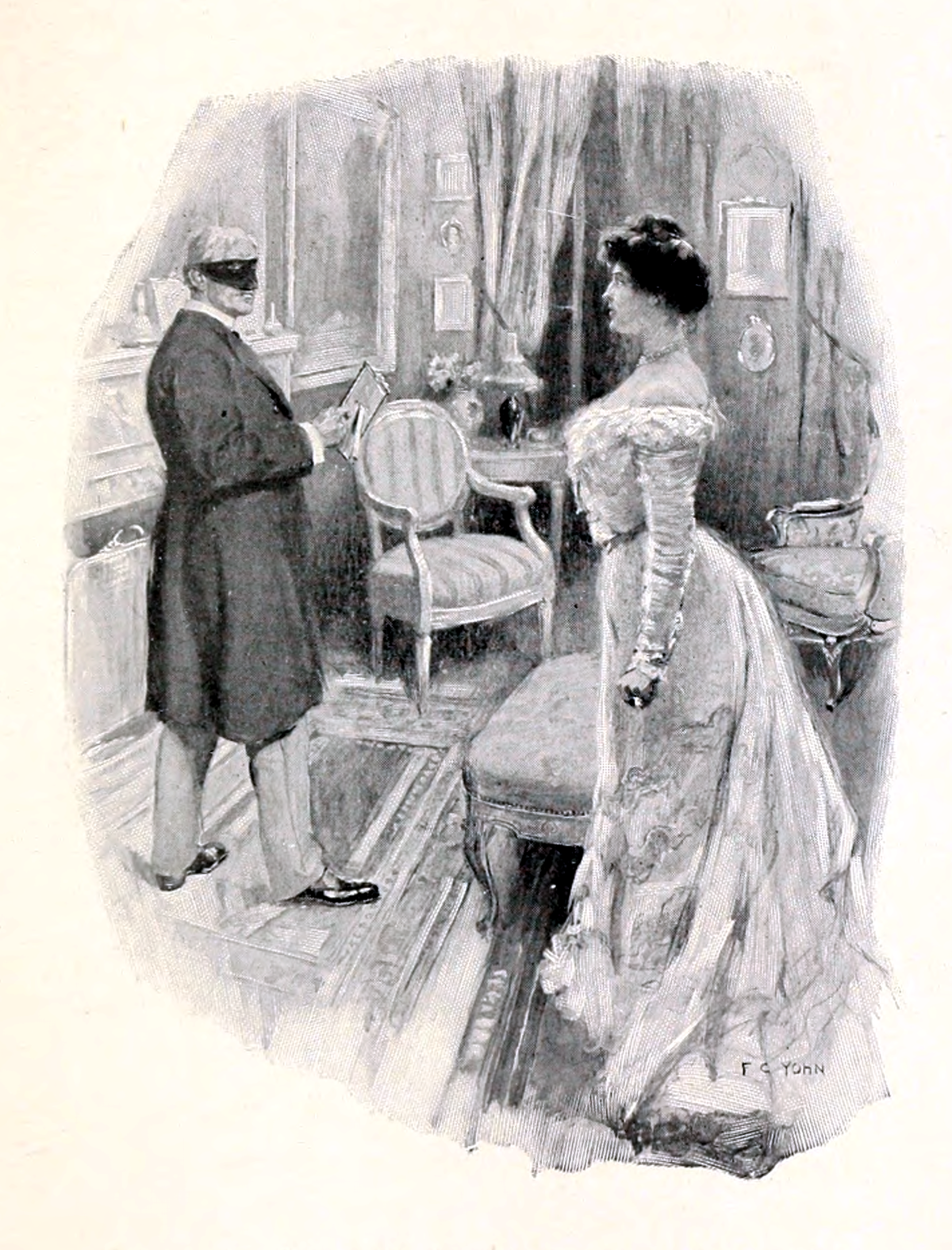
- Raffles and Saillard, 1906 illustration by F. C. Yohn
- Country: United Kingdom
- Language: English
- Genre: Crime fiction

Publication
- Publisher: Charles Scribner's Sons
- Media type: Print (Magazine)
- Publication date: June 1901

Chronology
- Series: A. J. Raffles
To Catch a Thief	The Wrong House

"An Old Flame" is a short story by E. W. Hornung, and features the gentleman thief A. J. Raffles, and his companion and biographer, Bunny Manders. The story was first published in Scribner's Magazine in June 1901. The story was also included as the sixth story in the collection The Black Mask, published by Grant Richards in London, and Charles Scribner's Sons in New York, both in 1901.

== Plot summary ==
=== Part one ===
Bunny pulls Raffles, disguised as the ailing Mr. Maturin, in a wheelchair through a relatively low-class residential area, when Raffles demands they stop near one peculiarly large, well-furnished house. They observe a couple dining inside. Raffles dashes away burgle the house. Bunny, unhappily, prepares himself to extricate Raffles, but Raffles climbs up to the house's balcony and enters without incident.

Bunny is able to watch both the dining couple and Raffles. The woman discovers Raffles, and recognizes him. Both disappear from sight. Bunny waits around the corner, unseen, until Raffles returns and urges them home.

At home, Raffles admits that the woman was Jacques Saillard, a famous painter, who once cheated on her husband with Raffles. Raffles had ended the relationship, and now fears that Saillard will blackmail him into reuniting with her. He has tried to lose her. Shortly, however, Saillard arrives at the flat, furious.

=== Part two ===
Saillard visits Raffles frequently for weeks, driving him ragged. Raffles tells Bunny that, because of the intolerability of both Saillard and Dr. Theobald, Bunny must leave and find them a new place to live. Raffles promises he will contact Bunny in ten days, or never at all.

Bunny stays at a hotel until he find a cottage for rent in Ham Common for him and Raffles. After a full ten days have passed without any sign from Raffles, Bunny impatiently returns to Earl's Court, where he finds Dr. Theobald, lamenting the death of Mr. Maturin, from typhoid.

Here was a new excitement in which to drown my grief; here was something to think about; and I should be spared the intolerable experience of a solitary return to the little place at Ham.

— Bunny, welcoming his apparent arrest

Bunny is devastated. He attends Raffles's funeral. There, a Scotland Yard official quietly arrests Bunny, and takes him away in a hansom. However, to Bunny's joy, the official quickly reveals himself to be Raffles. He has paid off Dr. Theobald and faked his death to throw off Saillard. Together, Raffles and Bunny continue to Ham Common.

== Adaptations ==
=== Television ===
The story was adapted into the last episode of the Raffles television series, with Anthony Valentine as A. J. Raffles and Christopher Strauli as Bunny Manders. The episode, titled "An Old Flame", first aired on 20 May 1977.

=== Radio ===
BBC Radio adapted the story into the fifteenth episode of its Raffles radio drama, "An Old Flame", which first aired on 15 August 1992. The drama features Jeremy Clyde as Raffles and Michael Cochrane as Bunny. The plot of the episode largely follows that of the original story, with some changes:

- At the start of the episode, Bunny himself has the flu.
- In the drama, Saillard was not married when Raffles knew her previously.
