= Gentleman Thief (2001 film) =

2001 film by Ernest William Hornung

- Genre: Crime drama
- Created by: Matthew Graham
- Based on: the stories by E.W. Hornung
- Directed by: Justin Hardy
- Starring: Nigel Havers; Michael French
- Composer: Christian Vassie
- Country of origin: United Kingdom
- Original language: English

Production
- Executive producer: Mal Young
- Producer: Victoria Fea
- Cinematography: Tim Palmer
- Editor: Michael Harrowes
- Production companies: Bravo Cable; BBC

Original release
- Network: BBC One
- Release: 24 June 2001

Gentleman Thief is a 2001 British television film loosely based on the A. J. Raffles stories by E. W. Hornung. It stars Nigel Havers as A. J. Raffles and Michael French as Ellis Bride, an original character who appears as Raffles's sidekick instead of Bunny Manders, Raffles's sidekick in Hornung's stories. It aired on 24 June 2001 on BBC One.

== Plot ==
Gentleman thief A.J. Raffles finds himself caught up in murder following the theft of a ruby.

== Production ==
The television film was written by Matthew Graham and directed by Justin Hardy. The executive producer was Mal Young and the producer was Victoria Fea. The music was composed by Christian Vassie.
