= Offending Angels =

- Directed by: Andrew Rajan
- Written by: Tim Moyler Moyler; Andrew Rajan
- Produced by: Andrew Rajan
- Starring: Susannah Harker; Shaun Parkes; Andrew Lincoln; Andrew Rajan
- Cinematography: Alvin Leong
- Edited by: Roger Burgess; Catherine Fletcher
- Music by: Martin Ward
- Distributed by: Guerilla Films
- Release dates: October 2000 (Raindance Film Festival); 19 April 2002
- Running time: 94 minutes
- Country: United Kingdom
- Language: English
- Budget: £70,000
- Box office: £79–89

Offending Angels is a 2000 British romantic comedy film directed by Andrew Rajan and written by Tim Moyler and Andrew Rajan, and produced by Rajan.

== Plot summary ==
Sam and Baggy are two non-committal slackers who waste their time on nonsensical pursuits while dreaming of greater things in life. Paris and Zeke are two guardian angels who confront them with plans for change. Paris is a former dolphin, while Zeke is a former squirrel.

== Cast ==
- Susannah Harker as Paris
- Shaun Parkes as Zeke
- Andrew Lincoln as Sam
- Andrew Rajan as Baggy
- Jack Davenport as Rory
- Stephen Mangan as Fergus
- Michael Cochrane as Mentor
- Jesse Hopkins as Young Sam

== Reception ==
The film became notorious because it took less than £100 at the box office.

=== Critics ===
The film polarized critics; it was panned by some—including the BBC, who called it a "truly awful pile of garbage", and Total Film, who called it "irredeemable"—but Film Review called it "A rather heartwarming story of the need to remember to live your life".

== Awards and nominations ==
Emden International Film Festival

- Nominated, "Emden Film Award" – Andrew Rajan
