= Barry Perowne =

English Writer (1908–1985)

William Philip Atkey (1908–1985) better known under the pseudonym Barry Perowne, was an English writer, best known for his crime fiction. Atkey also published books under his own name and under the pseudonym Pat Merriman.

== Life ==
Atkey, a nephew of the writer Bertram Atkey, was born on 25 June 1908 in Downton in the New Forest area of Wiltshire, England. He was educated at St John's College, Portsmouth. By agreement with the E W Hornung Estate, he continued the A. J. Raffles series after its creator E. W. Hornung's death. He was invited to do so in 1932, and after World War II regularly published in Ellery Queen's Magazine, The Saint Magazine and John Bull.

Atkey also wrote other stories with his own characters.

An amateur cricketer, Atkey played for the Somerset Stragglers. He died in Marbella on 24 December 1985.
