= The Burglar and the Lady =

Play by Langdon McCormick

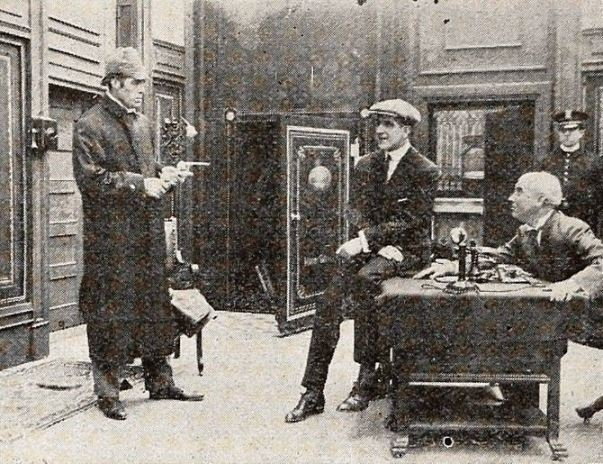
- Still from the 1914 film
- Original language: English
- Written by: Langdon McCormick
- Characters: Sherlock Holmes; A. J. Raffles
- Genre: Melodrama

Premiere
- Date: October 1, 1905
- Place: State Street Theater, Trenton, New Jersey

The Burglar and the Lady is a 1905 play written by Langdon McCormick that features the characters Sherlock Holmes and A. J. Raffles, which were originally created by other authors. The play was a commercial success, and a film adaptation was made in 1914.

== History ==
Like many of McCormick's plays, The Burglar and the Lady was primarily a touring show and first premiered on October 1, 1905, at the State Street Theatre in Trenton, New Jersey. It came to Broadway in September 1906, appearing for a week at the American Theatre. The story pitted Sherlock Holmes, the famous fictional detective created by Arthur Conan Doyle, against A. J. Raffles, a fictional criminal created by E. W. Hornung. McCormick did not bother to ask permission for the use of either character.

Former World Heavyweight boxing champion "Gentleman Jim" Corbett played Raffles. The character's nationality was changed from English to American to match Corbett's casting. The play was produced by Corbett's touring company. Sherlock Holmes was initially played by Arthur V. Johnson. The play toured the country for several years and several other actors played Holmes.

In the Sherlock Holmes journal Baker Street Miscellanea, Donald K. Pollock states that the play "was performed at least 374 times and toured the entire U.S., placing it among the more successful of Sherlockian plays."

== Reception ==
Following the Broadway production, a critic in the New York Dramatic Mirror praised Corbett for his "natural and self-possessed demeanor" but was more critical of Johnson's portrayal of Holmes, claiming he lacked "the air of confidence which should accompany the character". The reviewer also expressed concern that "the delights of thievery are exhibited in a way calculated to impress youths of criminal inclinations with a desire to emulate the successful burglar".

After a brief run of the play in Chicago in December 1906, a reviewer in the Chicago Examiner wrote regarding the play, "Sherlock Holmes gets the worst of it in every act and the 'burglar' finally gets 'the lady'". The reviewer also referenced Corbett's boxing career: "In this newest dramatic uplift, Corbett proceeds along new lines. Instead of foiling the other fellow with a right cross to the jaw and a left hook to the solar plexus, the actor uses nothing more persuasive than a pair of large .44-caliber revolvers."

== Film adaptation ==
The play was adapted as a silent film in 1914. Herbert Blaché directed and Corbett again played Raffles. The adaptation removed the Holmes character.
