= Bunny Manders =

Fictional companion to AJ Raffles

Harry "Bunny" Manders
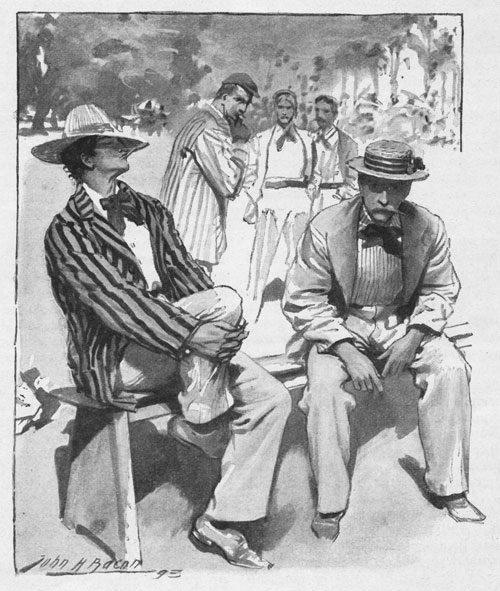
- Raffles and Bunny, 1898 illustration by John H. Bacon
- First appearance: "The Ides of March" (1898)
- Created by: E. W. Hornung
- Portrayed by: Christopher Strauli; Michael Cochrane and others

In-universe information
- Gender: Male
- Occupation: Gentleman thief Writer
- Nationality: British

Harry Manders (almost exclusively known as Bunny Manders) is a fictional character in the popular series of Raffles stories by E. W. Hornung. He is the companion of A. J. Raffles, a cricketer and gentleman thief, who makes a living robbing the rich in late Victorian British High Society.

Bunny is the narrator in the original Raffles short stories and novel by Hornung, from the first short story "The Ides of March" (1898) to the novel and last story Mr. Justice Raffles (1909).

== Inspiration ==
A. J. Raffles was to a certain extent an inverted version of Arthur Conan Doyle's character Sherlock Holmes, and Bunny, as the companion and biographer of Raffles, was similarly inspired by Dr. Watson.

The fact that Bunny contributed to his public school's magazine may have been inspired by Hornung's own experience, since Hornung's earliest literary work appeared in the magazine of his public school in 1882–83.

According to Richard Lancelyn Green, prototypes of Raffles and Bunny appeared in Hornung's short story "After the Fact", which was published in Chambers's Journal in January 1896. While the difference in age between Raffles and Bunny is not specified, the ages of these prototype characters are clearly stated in the story.

In "After the Fact", set in Australia, the narrator finds a burglar in an empty house and recognizes him, since the narrator had been the burglar's fag at their old school (as Bunny had been for Raffles): "'We were at school together,' I explained. 'I was your fag when you were captain of footer.' 'The Beetle!' cried Deedes, not unkindly; a moment later he was shaking my hand and smiling on my confusion...We were twenty-eight and twenty-four now, instead of eighteen and fourteen; yet, as we walked, only one of us was a man, and I was once more his fag. I felt quite proud when he accepted a cigarette from my case, prouder yet when he took my arm.'"

== Fictional biography ==
=== History ===
Bunny was an only child. He attended the same public school as Raffles. There was a considerable age gap between them and Bunny had been Raffles's fag (i.e. a younger pupil required to act as a personal servant to a senior one). Bunny had always admired the older, charming Raffles who was a top sportsman and seemed to prevail in anything he did. Bunny wrote verse for the school's magazine, and also did Raffles's verses for him. Raffles mentions in "The Ides of March" that Bunny edited the school magazine before leaving the school.

Ten years after they were at school together, during which time Bunny inherits a considerable amount of money, the two reunite at Raffles's apartment in the Albany to play baccarat with others. Bunny loses heavily during the course of the evening. However, he has spent his inheritance and is unable to pay his gambling debts. Feeling himself to be ruined and dishonoured, he returns later to confront Raffles and explain his situation, with the intention of then shooting himself. However, Raffles persuades him not to do this and offers to help.

Admiring his pluck, Raffles tricks Bunny into joining him on a burglary, and the two become companions in crime. Together the two launch a series of daring robberies on London society, until they are eventually exposed in "The Gift of the Emperor" and arrested on board a passenger liner. Raffles leaps overboard and is presumed drowned, while Bunny is returned to England to serve a term of eighteen months in prison. After his release, he writes a series of articles on prison life. A mysterious newspaper advertisement reunites him with Raffles, who survived jumping off the liner and is now living under a false name. The two men continue their crime spree, now acting as outlaws.

In 1900 both Raffles and Bunny volunteer for service in the Boer War, where soldiers of the British Empire were fighting the Boer guerillas. After uncovering an enemy spy, Raffles is killed in battle and Bunny is badly wounded. He returns to England to write his memoirs about his escapades with Raffles. He chooses not to write about a number of their thefts which were successful but uneventful.

=== Appearance ===
Bunny is fair-haired and short enough to pass himself off as a tall woman in "The Rest Cure".

Bunny has an innocent-looking appearance, and in the short story "An Old Flame", in which Bunny says he is thirty, he remarks that his appearance was not altered by his time in prison. Bunny writes, "Incredible as it may appear to the moralists, I had sustained no external hallmark by my term of imprisonment, and I am vain enough to believe that the evil which I did had not a separate existence in my face. This afternoon, indeed, I was struck by the purity of my fresh complexion, and rather depressed by the general innocence of the visage which peered into mine from the little mirror. My straw-colored moustache, grown in the flat after a protracted holiday, again preserved the most disappointing dimensions, and was still invisible in certain lights without wax."

Bunny's innocent appearance is useful for deflecting suspicion from him and Raffles, but Bunny is not a skilled actor, so Raffles sometimes keeps secrets from him to make sure Bunny seems as guiltless as possible. An instance of this occurs in "No Sinecure", in which Raffles remarks that Bunny's face is "worth its weight in innocence".

=== Personality ===
When Raffles tricks Bunny into joining him on a burglary in "The Ides of March", Bunny approaches the situation "with an involuntary zeal" and is entranced by the "romance and the peril of the whole proceeding". After learning Raffles is a burglar, Bunny expects that his liking and admiration for Raffles "must turn to loathing and disgust", yet to his own surprise, his regard for Raffles does not change. At the end of the story, Bunny initially has misgivings about becoming Raffles's partner in crime, but he ultimately agrees, telling Raffles, "I've gone to the devil anyhow. I can't go back, and wouldn't if I could. Nothing matters another rap! When you want me, I'm your man!".

Whereas Raffles is sharp-witted and cynical, the younger Bunny is more innocent and idealistic. Raffles often uses Bunny's naivete and innocent manner to his and Bunny's advantage. Bunny dislikes Raffles's tendency to keep secrets about his plans from him, noting in "A Costume Piece" that Raffles has "the instinctive secretiveness of the inveterate criminal". Generally, Bunny gets along with Raffles. For example, in "Gentlemen and Players", Bunny states that it was a pleasure for him "to accompany Raffles to all his [cricket] matches, to watch every ball he bowled, or played, or fielded, and to sit chatting with him in the pavilion when he was doing none of these three things".

=== Skills ===
Though not an expert burglar like Raffles, Bunny is a dependable and loyal accomplice to Raffles and assists him in a number of ways, such as by providing a distraction in "Nine Points of the Law", acting as a lookout in "The Field of Philippi", and saving Raffles when his plans go awry in "The Wrong House".

Bunny is a writer, and Raffles encourages Bunny to cultivate his career in journalism, to build a reputation as a cover for his secret occupation as a burglar. Bunny struggles as a journalist however, commenting, "It was no easy matter to keep your end up as a raw freelance of letters; for my part, I was afraid I wrote neither well enough nor ill enough for success." He can write verse, and a satiric verse he wrote obtained a better place in a magazine than anything he had written before then, but he found that writing verses did not pay. He eventually writes about his adventures with Raffles.

== As narrator ==
Bunny Manders is the first-person narrator of all of E. W. Hornung's Raffles stories. Hornung's creation of Bunny was influenced by Arthur Conan Doyle's character Dr. Watson, the first-person narrator of most of the Sherlock Holmes stories, although there are significant differences between them. For instance, Watson starts his narrative in the first Sherlock Holmes story, A Study in Scarlet, by providing preliminary information about his career, his service in the second Afghan war, why he needed relatively cheap lodgings, and how he came to be introduced to Holmes. In contrast, Bunny's narrative in the first Raffles story, "The Ides of March", starts right at a crucial point when Bunny returns to the Albany in despair over his gambling debt.

Like Watson, Bunny is frequently kept in the dark about his companion's plans. He also sometimes doubts Raffles's loyalty, but always realizes in the end that Raffles has worked events to their mutual advantage. Bunny thinks very highly of Raffles; he "relates Raffles’ adventures in tones that range from adulatory to fawning", and can be considered "an early example of the ultimately unreliable narrator".

While Bunny agrees to become Raffles's accomplice, he does worry about the ethics of their burglaries. William Vivian Butler writes that this eliminates any need for readers "to battle with [their] conscience: Bunny, the narrator of the stories, obligingly takes that chore clean off [their] shoulders". In addition, Bunny's concerns about the consequences that may befall him and Raffles contribute to the suspenseful atmosphere of the Raffles stories.

== Portrayals ==
=== Film ===
- Frank Morgan portrayed Bunny Manders in the 1917 film Raffles, the Amateur Cracksman.
- Lyonel Watts portrayed Bunny in the 1921 film Mr. Justice Raffles.
- In the 1925 film Raffles, the Amateur Cracksman, Bunny was played by Freeman Wood.
- Bunny was played by Bramwell Fletcher in the 1930 film Raffles.
- Claud Allister played Bunny in the 1932 film The Return of Raffles.
- Bunny was portrayed by Douglas Walton in the 1939 film Raffles.
  - In this film, Bunny has a sister, Gwen Manders, who is the love interest of Raffles.

=== Television ===
- Christopher Strauli portrayed Bunny Manders in the 1977 television series Raffles and its 1975 pilot episode, with Anthony Valentine as Raffles.

=== Radio ===
- "The Ides of March" was adapted for radio and broadcast on 9 December 1941 on the BBC Forces Programme, with Ronald Simpson as Bunny Manders. Raffles was voiced by Malcolm Graeme.
- Six of the Raffles stories were adapted and broadcast on the BBC Light Programme between 3 December 1945 and 14 January 1946. Bunny was voiced by Eric Micklewood opposite Frank Allenby as Raffles.
- A radio adaptation of Mr. Justice Raffles aired on the BBC Home Service on 8 February 1964. Bunny was voiced by Lewis Stringer, with Austin Trevor as Raffles.
- Michael Cochrane voiced Bunny in the BBC radio series Raffles (1985–1993).
- Dennis Bateman portrays Bunny in Raffles, the Gentleman Thief (2004–present), a series on the American radio show Imagination Theatre.

=== Theatre ===
- A play by Hornung and Eugene Presbrey, titled Raffles, the Amateur Cracksman, premiered at the Princess Theatre, New York, on 27 October 1903, with Stanton Elliot as Bunny Manders. Kyrle Bellew portrayed Raffles. The play premiered in London at the Comedy Theatre on 12 May 1906, with Graham Browne as Bunny, and Gerald du Maurier as Raffles.
- The play The Return of A. J. Raffles, written by Graham Greene, premiered in 1975 at the Aldwych Theatre, with Clive Francis as Bunny and Denholm Elliott as Raffles.
