= Christopher Strauli =

English actor (born 1946)

- Born: 13 April 1946 (age 80); Harpenden, Hertfordshire, England
- Occupation: Actor
- Years active: 1969–present
- Spouse: Lesley Pottle (m. 1977)
- Children: 4
- Website: http://www.strauli.co.uk

Christopher Strauli (born 13 April 1946) is an English film, television and theatre actor. He is known for appearing as Norman Binns in the British Yorkshire Television sitcom Only When I Laugh.

== Early life and education ==
Strauli was born in Harpenden, Hertfordshire. He was educated at Felixstowe Grammar School in Felixstowe, Suffolk. After teacher-training college he gave up a career as a mathematics and science teacher to attend the Royal Academy of Dramatic Art in London.

== Career ==
Following his education, he spent some years at the Bristol Old Vic, before earning some minor and supporting television roles.

Since 1969, Strauli has appeared in at least two films and over twenty-five television productions. In 1974 he appeared in On We Go, a series of 15-minute episodes teaching English.

Strauli played Bunny Manders, the assistant to A.J. Raffles, the gentleman thief in the Yorkshire Television series Raffles (1975–1977). He later appeared as feeble hospital patient Norman Binns in the ITV sitcom Only When I Laugh, occupying a bed in a ward next to characters played by James Bolam and Peter Bowles and attended by doctor Richard Wilson. Strauli was then recruited by the show's writer, Eric Chappell, to replace Richard Beckinsale in the film version of Rising Damp (another of Chappell's shows) as a new character, John, an art student.

He appeared as Benvolio in Romeo and Juliet (1978), Claudio in Measure for Measure (1979) as part of The BBC Television Shakespeare and he also appeared in the last episode of the period drama series Strangers and Brothers (1984).

He played a leading character, Paul Hatfield, in ITV 1985-86 sitcom Full House (known as Mixed Doubles in the United States) (1985) and also featured in some of Victoria Wood's sketch shows. In recent years he has concentrated predominantly on theatre work.

He appeared in the TV movie S.O.S. Titanic (1979) as wireless operator Harold Cottam, and in 3 episodes of the 1987 television serial of Fortunes of War playing Toby Lush. He played Nigel Smith in 1 episode of: Bergerac: "Tangos in the Night" the same year.

Strauli also appeared in Doctors as Paul Woodford in "God's Gift"(2000), Down to Earth as Mr. Bell in 'The Great Escape'(2000), and Waking the Dead, playing Duncan Sanderson MP, in Parts 1 and 2 of "False Flag" (2004).

== Filmography ==
Year	Title	Role	Notes
1972	Harriet's Back in Town	Chris Pearson	14 episodes
1975-1977	Raffles	Bunny Manders	14 episodes
1977	Eustace and Hilda	Eustace	2 episodes
1978-1979	BBC Television Shakespeare	Benvolio/Claudio	2 episodes, Romeo and Juliet, Measure for Measure
1979-1982	Only When I Laugh	Norman Binns	29 episodes
1985-1986	Full House	Paul Hatfield	20 episode
1987	Fortunes of War	Toby Lush	3 episodes
