= Michael Cochrane =

English actor (born 1947)

- Born: Michael Dundonald Cochrane; 19 May 1947 (age 79); Brighton, Sussex, England
- Occupation: Actor
- Years active: 1973–present
- Spouse: Belinda Carroll (m. 1979)
- Children: 1

Michael Dundonald Cochrane (born 19 May 1947) is an English actor. He has played Oliver Sterling in the Radio 4 soap opera The Archers since 2007.

== Early life ==
Cochrane was born 19 May 1947, in Brighton, East Sussex. He was educated at Cranleigh School.

== Career ==
Cochrane played the role of a fireman in Are You Being Served? in 1972 and Lieutenant Charles Gaylion, a Royal Flying Corps pilot in the BBC television series Wings (1977–78). He has twice appeared in the BBC science fiction series Doctor Who, first as Charles Cranleigh in the serial Black Orchid (1982) and later as Redvers Fenn-Cooper in Ghost Light (1989). Cochrane was later associated with Doctor Who when he appeared in the 2006 Big Finish Productions audio drama, No Man's Land. This was followed by further appearances in the 2008 Big Finish Productions audio drama Brotherhood of the Daleks, Trail of the White Worm/The Oseidon Adventure in 2012, and The Fate of Krelos/Return to Telos in 2015.

Cochrane has also appeared as different characters in the Yorkshire Television period drama Heartbeat. His first appearance was as the narcissistic businessman Derek Lightfoot in the episode Fool for Love (1997). A further appearance came in 2009, when Cochrane appeared as a character named Cunningham, a confidence trickster and sneak thief, in two episodes ("Thursday's Children" and "The Middle of Somewhere"), both of which were set in Australia.

Other significant roles in which Cochrane has appeared are The Pallisers (1974), Love in a Cold Climate (1980), The Citadel (1983), a BBC serial adaptation of Goodbye Mr. Chips (1984), Raffles (1985–1993), No Job for a Lady, The Chief (1990–1995), and as Sir Henry Simmerson in the Sharpe series. His film career has included roles in Escape to Victory (1981), The Return of the Soldier (1982), Real Life (1984), Number One Gun (1990), The Saint (1997), Incognito (1998), A Different Loyalty (2004), and The Iron Lady (2011).

He was featured in the ITV science fiction series The Uninvited. In 2008, he appeared in the soap opera Doctors as Daniel's solicitor and in 2009 in Margaret as MP Alan Clark.

He appeared in the sitcom Perfect World as the sex-obsessed marketing director. He appeared in Offending Angels (2002). He was seen as the vicar in Downton Abbey with Hugh Bonneville and Maggie Smith.

He had a small role in episode 5 of the BBC serial drama The Musketeers (2014). He had a small role as Roger in series 1 episode 1 of the BBC sitcom Dear John. He appeared as the ship's officer in the BBC's Keeping Up Appearances episode titled "Sea Fever" (1993), and he also appeared as Mr Price in the ITV's detective drama Wycliffe episode titled "Strangers" (1997).

In 2016, he played the role of Henry Marten in the Netflix series The Crown.

Since 2007, Cochrane has played Oliver Sterling in the Radio 4 soap opera The Archers.

In 2019 Cochrane appeared as one of the Number 2's in the 2016 Big Finish Productions audio drama adaptation of the cult 1960s British TV series The Prisoner aired by BBC Radio 4 Extra. In 2021, he appeared as Mr Kingsley the lawyer in The Outlaws.

== Personal life ==
Cochrane is married to the actress Belinda Carroll.

== Filmography ==
Year	Title	Role	Notes
1974	The Pallisers	Gerald	Miniseries
1974	Warship	Lieutenant Palfrey, RM	2 episodes
1975	Love Thy Neighbour	Bernard	Season 6 episode 6
1976–1978	Wings	Lt. Charles Gaylion	
1980	Love in a Cold Climate	Cedric Hampton	TV Serial
1981	The Life and Times of David Lloyd George	Charles Masterman	TV Serial
1981	Escape to Victory	Farrell – The English	
1982, 1989	Doctor Who	Lord Cranleigh/Redvers Fenn-Cooper	"Black Orchid"/"Ghost Light"
1982	The Return of the Soldier	Stephen	
1983	Ascendancy	Officer	
1984	Strangers and Brothers	Sammikins	2 episodes
1984	Frankenstein	Henry Clervell	TV movie
1984	Real Life	Lipton	
1984	Hay Fever	Sandy Tyrell	TV play
1987	Fortunes of War	Clifford	Miniseries
1989–2010	The Bill	Commander Whiteside/Nigel Boscombe/Howard Walsh	3 episodes
1990	Howard's Way	Pierre Challon	1 episode
1990	Number One Gun	Flash Fairmaid	
1992	The Darling Buds of May	Former Battle of Britain pilot	Episode: A Season of Heavenly Gifts
1992	A Dangerous Man: Lawrence After Arabia	Winston Churchill	TV movie
1993–2008	Sharpe	Sir Henry Simmerson	
1993	Keeping Up Appearances	The Ship's Officer	Episode: Sea Fever
1994	EastEnders	Coroner	2 episodes
1997	The Saint	Cold Fusion Broker	
1997	Wycliffe	Mr. Price	Episode: Strangers
1997	Heartbeat	Derek Lightfoot	Episode: Fool for Love
1998	Coronation Street	Bob Fay	1 episode
1998	Incognito	Deeks	
2000	Offending Angels	Mentor	
2002	A Touch of Frost	Babcock, HMI	2 episodes
2003	Spooks	Ross Vaughan	1 episode
2003	Rosemary & Thyme	Franklin Danvers	1 episode
2004	A Different Loyalty	Dick Madsen	
2004	Monarch of the Glen	Colonel Ford	1 episode
2004	Jonathan Creek	Owen Glendower	1 episode
2005–2019	Doctors	Rowland Bryant/Charles Honeychurch/Tom O'Docherty/Judge David Tennyson	
2006	Wire in the Blood	Judge Hynes	1 episode
2009	Heartbeat	Cunningham	Episode: Thursday's Children
2010	Law & Order: UK	Judge Burchville	Episode: Help
2011–2012, 2015	Downton Abbey	Reverend Travis	
2011	The Iron Lady	William	
2012	Run for Your Wife	Man on Bus	
2012	Titanic: Blood and Steel	Captain Smith	Miniseries
2013	The Escape Artist	Judge	Miniseries (Part 2)
2014	The Musketeers	Judge	Episode: Homecoming
2016	The Crown	Henry Marten	Episode: Scientia Potentia Est
2016	We're Doomed! The Dad's Army Story (TV movie)	Arnold Ridley/Pte Godfrey	
2021	The Outlaws	Mr Kingsley (lawyer)	Episodes 2&5
2022	Living	Sir James	
2023	Call the Midwife	Sir Brigham Aylward	1 episode
2026	Beyond Paradise	Kenneth Linder	Series 4, Episode 1

== Radio ==
Year	Title	Role	Notes
1985–1993	Raffles	Bunny Manders	BBC Radio 4
1995-1997	Thackeray (radio plays)	Private detective Jim Thackeray	BBC Radio 4
2000–	The Archers	Oliver Sterling	BBC Radio 4 Soap Opera
2002–2003	King Street Junior Revisited	Mr Maxwell	BBC Radio 4

== Video games ==
Year	Title	Role	Notes
2021	Bravely Default II	Archbishop Domenic	Voice role
