= The Pall Mall Magazine =

Monthly literary magazine

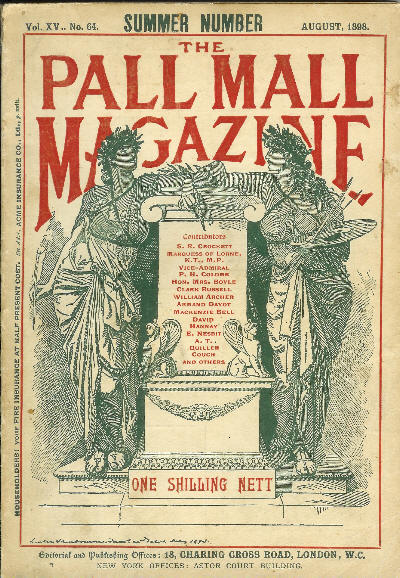
- Editor: Douglas Straight (1893–1896); Lord Frederick Spencer Hamilton (1896–1900); George Halkett (1901–1905); Charles Morley (1905–1914)
- Categories: Literature
- Frequency: Monthly
- Founder: William Waldorf Astor
- Founded: 1893
- Final issue: 1914
- Country: United Kingdom

The Pall Mall Magazine was a monthly British literary magazine published between 1893 and 1914. Begun by William Waldorf Astor as an offshoot of The Pall Mall Gazette, the magazine included poetry, short stories, serialized fiction, and general commentaries, along with extensive artwork. It was notable in its time as the first British magazine to "publish illustrations in number and finish comparable to those of American periodicals of the same class" much of which was in the late Pre-Raphaelite style. It was often compared to the competing publication The Strand Magazine; many artists, such as illustrator Sidney Paget and author H. G. Wells, sold freelance work to both.

During its run, the magazine published many of the most significant artists of the day, including illustrators George Morrow and Edmund Joseph Sullivan, poets Algernon Charles Swinburne and Rudyard Kipling, and authors such as Julian Osgood Field, Bernard Capes, Charlotte O'Conor Eccles, Jack London, M. R. James, and Joseph Conrad, whose novel Typhoon was first serialized therein, and Israel Zangwill (author of Children of the Ghetto). Among the magazine's editors were Douglas Straight (1893–1896), Lord Frederick Hamilton (1896–1900), George Halkett (1901–1905) and Charles Morley (1905–1914).

On 6 October 1912, The New York Times reported that Waldorf Astor had sold the magazine, "Said to Have Obtained Very Little for It." In 1914, as romantic ideas faded with the onset of the First World War, The Pall Mall Magazine merged with Nash's Magazine, controlled by the Hearst Corporation since 1910, to become Nash's Pall Mall Magazine. From May 1927, the two magazines were again published separately, but they were re-merged after the September 1929 issue, and finally ceased publication altogether following the issue of September 1937.
