= A. J. Raffles =

Character in the works of E. W. Hornung

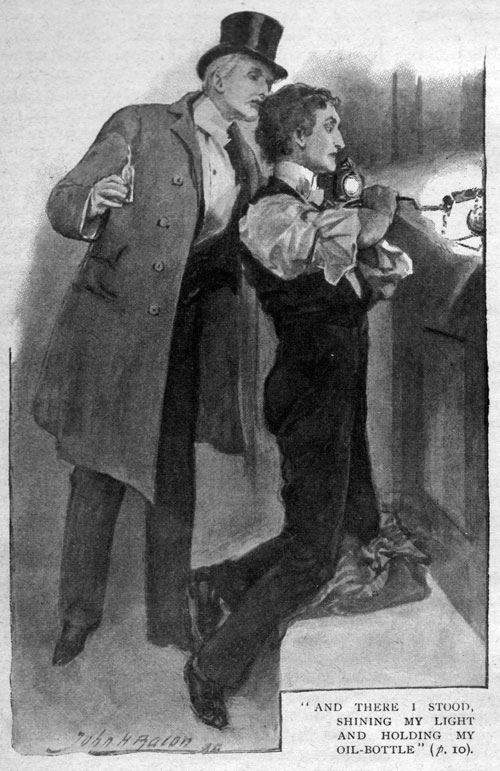
- Raffles (right) lock-picking with Bunny's assistance, by John H. Bacon (1898)
- First appearance: "The Ides of March" (1898)
- Created by: E. W. Hornung
- Portrayed by: Anthony Valentine; Jeremy Clyde; David Niven and others

In-universe information
- Gender: Male
- Occupation: Gentleman thief "Amateur" cricketer
- Nationality: British

Arthur J. Raffles (usually called A. J. Raffles) is a fictional character created in 1898 by E. W. Hornung, brother-in-law of Sir Arthur Conan Doyle, the creator of Sherlock Holmes. Raffles is, in many ways, an inversion of Holmes – he is a "gentleman thief", living at the Albany, a prestigious address in London, also rents an art studio as his own fence after jobs, playing cricket as a gentleman (or "amateur") for the Gentlemen of England and supporting himself by carrying out ingenious burglaries. He is called the "Amateur Cracksman" and often, at first, differentiates between him and the "professors" – professional criminals from the lower classes.

As Holmes has Dr. Watson to chronicle his adventures, Raffles has Harry "Bunny" Manders – a former schoolmate saved from disgrace by Raffles, whom Raffles persuaded to accompany him on a burglary. Raffles is an expert thief and like Holmes, he is a master of disguise. Raffles's adventures have been adapted across various media, the character played by a number of popular actors including Anthony Valentine and John Barrymore and David Niven.

== Inspiration ==
Hornung was inspired by the Sherlock Holmes stories of his brother-in-law Arthur Conan Doyle and dedicated The Amateur Cracksman to Doyle: "To A. C. D. This Form of Flattery". It has been suggested that Raffles's name may have been inspired by the title of Doyle's 1891 novel The Doings of Raffles Haw. Richard Lancelyn Green points out that Raffles shares his first name with Conan Doyle and with Hornung's son, Arthur Oscar Hornung. Raffles's initials are those of Hornung's housemaster at Uppingham School, A. J. Tuck and reversed, those of J. A. Turner, the cricket captain at Uppingham during 1882, Hornung's first year.

The model for Raffles was George Ives, a Cambridge-educated criminologist and talented cricketer, according to Andrew Lycett. Hornung and Ives played cricket for the Authors Cricket Club. Ives was privately homosexual and although Hornung "may not have understood this sexual side of Ives' character", Raffles "enjoys a remarkably intimate relationship with his sidekick Bunny Manders". Owen Dudley Edwards writes that Raffles and Bunny are "an imitation of Holmes and Watson which is very obviously homosexual", while C. P. Snow, in a 1975 review, describes their relationship as juvenile and innocent but with homosexual undertones. Raffles is also shown to have romantic relationships with the Neapolitan girl Faustina (in "The Fate of Faustina") and a woman artist using the name Jacques Saillard (in "An Old Flame"). Biographer Peter Rowland notes that these relationships are not shown until the second Raffles story collection, The Black Mask.

Rowland writes that Raffles and Manders were also fictionalised versions of Oscar Wilde and his lover, Lord Alfred Douglas. Characters in Hornung's 1896 short story "After the Fact" were prototypes for Raffles and Bunny. In "After the Fact", which is set in Australia, a young man, Bower, discovers that the man he used to fag for at school, Deedes, is a burglar. Hornung explained in an interview with Tit-Bits in 1909:

A good many years ago I wrote a story about a public-school villain; he committed a terrible crime in Australia, and was met by his old fag, who shielded him. Unfortunately, I killed the villain at the end of the story. One day my brother-in-law, Sir Arthur Conan Doyle, to whom I owe a very great deal, said to me, 'What a pity you killed that fellow! A public-school villain would be a new figure for a series. Why not revive him?' 'I don't believe I could write such a series to save my life,' I replied. However, I was advised to think the suggestion over. I did so, and the eventual result was a variation of the type in the shape of Raffles.

"After the Fact" was inspired by Hornung's travels in Australia and by his only experience with a real burglar, which occurred while the author was living at Teddington, England. Hornung described the incident to Tit-Bits in 1909 when discussing Raffles, though the burglar was unimpressive and nothing like the gentleman thief character. Hornung had been asked by a house's caretakers to help them catch a burglar, who tried to hide in a space under the kitchen floor but was ultimately apprehended by a policeman.

In his book Raffles and His Creator, Peter Rowland states that Deedes is Raffles's prototype, but also differs significantly from Raffles. While Raffles and Deedes are both charismatic, Raffles has a code of honour and "is not really evil at all" according to Rowland, whereas Deedes "turns very nasty indeed" after Bower tries to get him to return the money he stole. Rowland writes that "Hornung (having passed the midway point of his story) had realised that he was on very dangerous ground and had speedily de-glamorised Deedes. Morality had been asserted at the eleventh hour, and justice had to be administered without further ado.... After experimenting with his new concept in 'After the Fact', Hornung was aware that his amateur cracksman would have to be a thoroughly decent chap even if he is a bit of a law-breaker." Furthermore, Raffles views burglary as a sporting challenge and has a prominent position in society (as a gentleman cricketer), unlike Deedes, who is only after money and is a social outcast.

== Fictional biography ==
=== History ===
Raffles has a sister. At his public school, Raffles played cricket and was captain of the eleven. He also played rugby football. He attended the same public school as Bunny, who was Raffles's fag (a junior student who does menial jobs for an older student). In "The Ides of March" Bunny says that Raffles was kind to him at school. In turn, Bunny would help Raffles sneak out of their dormitory at night, pulling up the rope after him and later letting it down for him to climb back in. Raffles stole at least one policeman's helmet while at Oxford according to the short story "A Costume Piece", but was a member of the Cambridge cricket team according to "The Field of Philippi". Raffles eventually becomes a gentleman cricketer. At one point, he goes to Australia to play cricket and commits his first burglary there, as he tells Bunny in "Le Premier Pas". He uses the prestige of his sporting fame to maintain his standing in London society, while secretly supporting himself with burglary. Raffles plays for multiple cricket clubs and teams, including I Zingari, the Gentlemen against the Players, the Middlesex eleven, and the English team. He lives in the Albany, a prestigious residential building in London.

Ten years after they were at their public school together, Raffles meets Bunny again when they play baccarat with others in "The Ides of March". Raffles saves Bunny from disgrace and suicide, and Bunny becomes his accomplice. "The Ides of March" takes place in March 1891 (according to biographer Peter Rowland). Raffles and Bunny act as "amateur" (gentleman) thieves and rob wealthy members of London society while appearing respectable. They encounter a rival thief, Crawshay, in "Gentlemen and Players" and again in "The Return Match". Scotland Yard detective Inspector Mackenzie, who is first mentioned in "A Costume Piece" and is first seen by Bunny in "Gentlemen and Players", is suspicious of Raffles. Inspector Mackenzie ultimately exposes Raffles and Bunny as burglars in "The Gift of the Emperor" on a passenger liner. Raffles jumps overboard, and is believed to have drowned, while Bunny is arrested and serves a term of eighteen months in prison.

Raffles survives and goes to Italy, where he endures hardships, as he later tells Bunny in "The Fate of Faustina". Raffles returns to England, and in "No Sinecure", set in May 1897, Raffles, now in disguise so that the police will not realize he is alive, reunites with Bunny. They become "professional" thieves and no longer have their old positions as respectable gentlemen in society. Initially, Raffles pretends to be an invalid named Mr. Maturin living under a doctor's supervision in an Earl's Court flat, with Bunny as his nurse. After Raffles fakes his death a second time in "An Old Flame", they move to a cottage owned by a genial landlady on the edge of Ham Common, where Raffles pretends he is Bunny's brother Ralph. In December 1899, Raffles and Bunny become interested in the Boer War. In 1900, they decide to volunteer for service in the war, leaving England in February and enlisting in South Africa. Six months after first taking an interest in the war, Raffles is killed in battle. Bunny, wounded in battle, eventually returns to England and writes about his adventures with Raffles.

=== Appearance ===
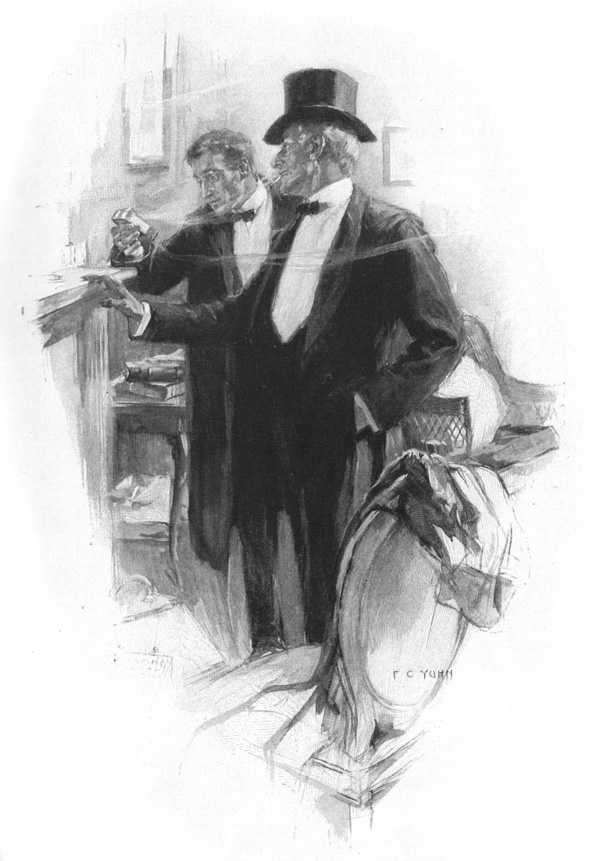
Raffles (right) with Bunny after returning from Italy, by F. C. Yohn (1901)

At the start of the series, Raffles has piercing steel blue eyes, curly black hair, pale skin, an athletic build, a strong, unscrupulous mouth, and is clean-shaven. As Raffles tells Bunny, after recounting his first burglary: '"I used to have rather a heavy moustache," said Raffles, "but I lost it the day after I lost my innocence."' He is some years older than Bunny, who is thirty years old in "An Old Flame", which takes place sometime after Raffles and Bunny reunite in "No Sinecure".

After returning from Italy, Raffles's appearance is considerably aged due to his hardships abroad. His face is more wrinkled and pale than before, he appears weakened, and his hair has turned completely white. His sharp eyes and strong mouth, however, are unchanged. His physical strength later returns to him when he and Bunny move to live in the suburbs, where Raffles also wears clouded spectacles during the day to partially conceal his face.

Raffles dyes his hair after he decides to volunteer for military service in 1900, to make sure he is not recognized by officers he knew in the past. According to Bunny, Raffles acquires "a bottle of ladies' hair-dye, warranted to change any shade into the once fashionable yellow", though Raffles is ultimately "ginger-headed" by the end of January, shortly before they leave England.

=== Personality ===
Raffles is charismatic and has "the subtle power of making himself irresistible at will", as stated by Bunny. Raffles is cynical about society, and is aware that his social position depends upon his status as a cricketer. At one point, he comments "we can't all be moralists, and the distribution of wealth is all wrong anyway". He does have scruples, despite his profession – he will not steal from his host, and will not kill to accomplish a burglary. (He does kill once under different circumstances according to the story he recounts in "The Fate of Faustina" and plans to at another time in "Wilful Murder".) He tells Bunny that he would settle down permanently if he could just make a big enough haul. He is also very patriotic.

In "Gentlemen and Players", Raffles claims he has lost all enthusiasm for cricket, and keeps it up only as a cover for his real occupation (which he considers more exciting) and as mental exercise. However, Bunny observes that Raffles practises earnestly before the first match of the season, and that when Raffles did play, "there was no keener performer on the field, nor one more anxious to do well for his side."

Though Raffles is driven by economic necessity, he also pursues burglary as a sporting challenge, and considers himself a sort of artist. Some of his crimes do not involve a motive for profit. In a late story, he steals a gold cup from the British Museum on impulse: when challenged by Bunny as to how he will dispose of it, he posts it to the Queen as a Diamond Jubilee present. In "The Field of Philippi", he steals money from a tight-fisted Old Boy and donates it all to their former school, partly to spite the man. His last crime, committed just before he goes off to the Boer War, is to steal a collection of memorabilia of his crimes from New Scotland Yard's Black Museum.

While Raffles sometimes keeps parts of his plans secret from Bunny for various reasons, for instance to keep Bunny from inadvertently revealing something, he knows that Bunny's loyalty and bravery are to be relied on utterly. In several stories, Bunny saves the day for the two of them after Raffles gets into situations he cannot get out of on his own.

Raffles is a member of The Old Bohemian Club, is partial to expensive dining and champagne (Cafe Royal, Romano’s, and Willis’s restaurants ), expensive invitation trips to country estates, expensive clothing, to Scotch Whiskey and Sullivan cigarettes and keeps them in a silver cigarette case.

=== Skills ===
Raffles using his rope-ladder, by Cyrus Cuneo (1905)

One of the things that Raffles has in common with Sherlock Holmes is a mastery of disguise – during his days as an ostensible man-about-town, Raffles keeps the components of various disguises in a studio apartment in Chelsea, which he maintains under a false name. He can imitate the regional speech of many parts of Britain flawlessly, and is fluent in Italian.

Raffles is adept at using burglary tools such as hand drills and skeleton keys. He also uses more unusual tools of his own invention, including a rope-ladder which can be concealed under his waistcoat and hooked up with a telescopic walking-stick, and a small velvet bag designed to silence the sound of filing a skeleton key. These tools are used in various stories and displayed together in Scotland Yard's Black Museum in "The Raffles Relics". He has a small dark lantern in "The Ides of March" and uses a collapsible opera hat as a makeshift lantern in "The Rest Cure". He takes time to examine places he intends to steal from in advance, and is capable of improvising when the need arises.

Raffles is also skilled as a cricketer. In "Gentlemen and Players", Bunny describes Raffles as "a dangerous bat, a brilliant field, and perhaps the very finest slow bowler of his decade". Raffles believes that bowling provides good mental practice for "always looking for the weak spot", and Bunny, while watching Raffles play, notices how Raffles's skills as a cricketer overlap with his skills as a thief: "What I admired, and what I remember, was the combination of resource and cunning, of patience and precision, of head-work and handiwork, which made every over an artistic whole. It was all so characteristic of that other Raffles whom I alone knew!"

== Reception ==
The Raffles stories were instantly popular in Britain. Raffles became the second most popular fictional character of the time, behind Sherlock Holmes. Raffles has also been called the most famous fictional cricketer.

In his 1944 essay "Raffles and Miss Blandish", George Orwell writes that Raffles and Bunny hold themselves to certain standards of behaviour as gentlemen even though they are criminals, in contrast with the violent criminals of then-contemporary crime fiction. Orwell, who calls Raffles "one of the best-known characters in English fiction", states that "the charm of Raffles is partly in the period atmosphere and partly in the technical excellence of the stories.... However, the truly dramatic thing, about Raffles, the thing that makes him a sort of byword even to this day (only a few weeks ago, in a burglary case, a magistrate referred to the prisoner as 'a Raffles in real life'), is the fact that he is a gentleman."

Orwell says in his essay that, though Raffles and Bunny "are devoid of religious belief, and they have no real ethical code, merely certain rules of behaviour", they "are gentlemen, and such standards as they do have are not to be violated. Certain things are 'not done', and the idea of doing them hardly arises. Raffles will not, for example, abuse hospitality. He will commit a burglary in a house where he is staying as a guest, but the victim must be a fellow-guest and not the host." Orwell also comments that Raffles's crimes are relatively minor, and that the stories contain very little "sensationalism" in the form of violence, unlike many other works of crime fiction, including novels written from the perspective of a detective.

Literary critic Stuart Evers said of the Raffles stories, "Their off-kilter plotting and sometimes hysterical style, which Hornung uses to great effect to show Bunny's emotionally erratic state, may date them. But the constant inventiveness and sly wit of Hornung make every one a real joy. They are among the great treasures of crime writing, and should be cherished as such."

== Influence ==
Raffles has been described as "the classic gentleman thief". The character contributed to the archetype of the gentleman criminal who has a code of honour, steals only from the rich, and is drawn to burglary for the sport as much as for the money.

A. J. Raffles appeared in print before author Maurice Leblanc created the French gentleman thief character Arsène Lupin in 1905 but after Ponson du Terrail created the character of Rocambole in 1857. Jess Nevins writes that Raffles is better known than Lupin in English-speaking countries, though Lupin has been more widely imitated in the popular literature of Europe, Asia, and Central and South America. Martin Edwards states that Lupin was heavily influenced by Raffles. According to Federico Pagello, the Raffles series was the most influential predecessor to the Lupin series, though both series were also influenced by the Sherlock Holmes stories by Arthur Conan Doyle and, for Lupin at least, by Rocambole. The gentleman thief character Raffles (Lord Lister), introduced in a German magazine in 1908, was an imitation of Hornung's Raffles.

The British press used Raffles as a synonym for a real-life thief in at least forty-seven newspaper articles in the period 1905–1939, in many cases in the headlines. Examples include the articles "'Raffles' in Real Life" (Daily Express, 1907), "Exploit of a 'Raffles'" (Daily Herald, 1927), and "A Modern Raffles" (Police Journal, 1939). The same usage can be seen in press reports from the same period in other countries, such as "'Cat' Burglar: A Modern Raffles" (Brisbane Courier, 1927) and "Feminine Raffles Comes to Grief" (Los Angeles Times, 1927). Raffles has also been referenced in newspaper articles about real thefts since this period.

While Raffles and Bunny were inspired by Sherlock Holmes and Dr. Watson, several of the Holmes stories, including the story of his return from the dead, were not published until after the first two collections of Raffles short stories, The Amateur Cracksman and The Black Mask, were published in 1899 and 1901 respectively. Arthur Conan Doyle killed off Holmes in "The Adventure of the Final Problem" (1893) and did not write of him again until The Hound of the Baskervilles (serialised 1901–1902), which is set before "The Adventure of the Final Problem". Peter Rowland writes that Doyle's biographers generally acknowledge that his decision to return Holmes to life in "The Adventure of the Empty House" in October 1903 was prompted by Hornung's success with A. J. Raffles, who had been returned to life in the 1901 story "No Sinecure" after his supposed death in an earlier story. The grand reveal scene in "The Adventure of the Empty House", when Holmes drops his disguise, parallels Raffles's own reveal scene in "No Sinecure". Thus, while the pre-hiatus Sherlock Holmes stories influenced the Raffles stories, this relationship would later be reversed.

The plot of the Sherlock Holmes story "The Adventure of Charles Augustus Milverton" (1904) was inspired by the Raffles story "Wilful Murder" (1899), according to Richard Lancelyn Green. A character in the Sherlock Holmes novel The Valley of Fear (1915), Scottish police detective Inspector MacDonald, may have been inspired by the Scottish police detective Inspector Mackenzie of the Raffles stories, though the two inspectors are very different in character.

John Kendrick Bangs wrote a series of stories about Raffles Holmes, collected in the 1906 book Raffles Holmes and Company. He is described as the son of Sherlock Holmes by Marjorie Raffles, the daughter of A.J. Raffles.

== Works ==
A. J. Raffles appears in the following four books (three short story collections and one novel) by E. W. Hornung. Most of the short stories were first published in magazines.

- The Amateur Cracksman (1899, 8 short stories)
- The Black Mask (1901, 8 short stories)
- A Thief in the Night (1905, 10 short stories)
- Mr. Justice Raffles (1909 novel)

Raffles also features in pastiches written by Barry Perowne, Peter Tremayne, Richard Foreman, and other authors.

== Adaptations ==
Like Holmes, the Raffles stories have been adapted into multiple forms of popular media across the 20th and 21st centuries, some even co-authored by Hornung himself.

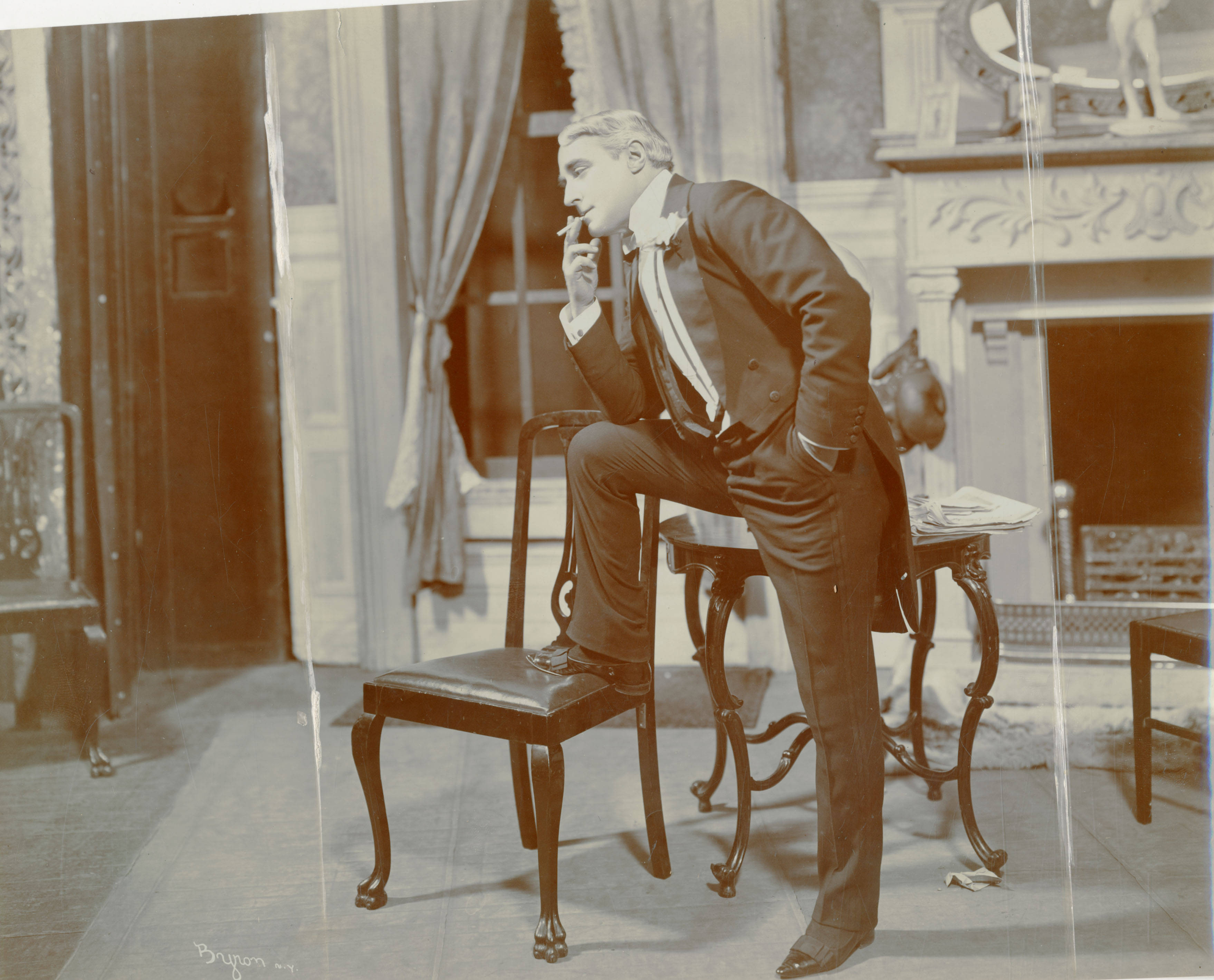
Kyrle Bellew in the Broadway production of Raffles, the Amateur Cracksman (1903)

=== Theatre ===
- Kyrle Bellew portrayed Raffles in the premiere of Raffles, the Amateur Cracksman, a play by Hornung and Eugene Presbrey, which opened on 27 October 1903 in New York. The play premiered in London on 12 May 1906, starring Gerald du Maurier as Raffles. André Brulé starred as Raffles in a 1907 production in Paris. Eille Norwood, later famous for his silent film portrayal of Sherlock Holmes, appeared as Raffles in a touring version of the play in 1909.
- James J. Corbett portrayed an American version of Raffles in the play The Burglar and the Lady, by Langdon McCormick, in 1906.
- The play A Visit from Raffles, by Hornung and Charles Sansom, premiered in 1909 with H. A. Saintsbury as Raffles.
- Denholm Elliott starred as Raffles in the 1975 premiere of The Return of A. J. Raffles, written by Graham Greene.

=== Film ===
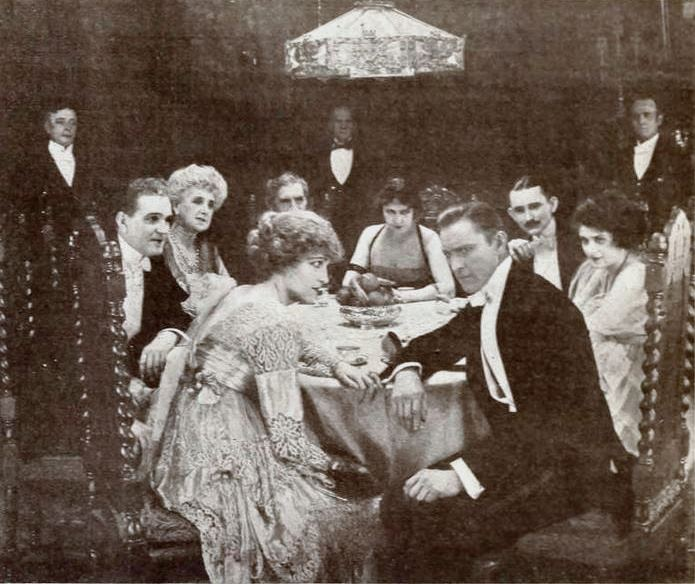
John Barrymore (right foreground) in Raffles, the Amateur Cracksman (1917)

- Raffles was portrayed by J. Barney Sherry in the 1905 short film Raffles, the Amateur Cracksman.
- Forrest Holger-Madsen portrayed Raffles in three short films released in Denmark in 1908, with Viggo Larsen as Sherlock Holmes.
- Reggie Morris portrayed Raffles in the 1913 film The Van Nostrand Tiara.
- James J. Corbett played Raffles in the 1914 film version of the play The Burglar and the Lady.
- Raffles was played by John Barrymore in the 1917 film Raffles, the Amateur Cracksman.
- Gerald Ames portrayed Raffles in the 1921 film Mr. Justice Raffles.
- House Peters portrayed Raffles In the 1925 film Raffles, the Amateur Cracksman.
- Ronald Colman played Raffles in the 1930 film Raffles.
- George Barraud played Raffles in the 1932 film The Return of Raffles.
- Raffles was played by David Niven in the 1939 film Raffles.
- Rafael Bertrand portrayed a Mexican version of the character in the 1958 film Raffles.

=== Radio ===
- Raffles was voiced by Frederic Worlock in a CBS radio production, Raffles, the Amateur Cracksman (1934).
- Malcolm Graeme voiced Raffles in a radio adaptation of "The Ides of March" broadcast on 9 December 1941 on the BBC Forces Programme.
- Horace Braham voiced Raffles in CBS radio productions between 1942 and 1945.
- Raffles was voiced by Frank Allenby in six radio episodes broadcast on the BBC Light Programme between 3 December 1945 and 14 January 1946.
- Douglas Fairbanks, Jr. voiced Raffles in a radio adaptation for Screen Directors Playhouse that aired September 14, 1951.
- Austin Trevor voiced Raffles in a radio adaptation of Mr. Justice Raffles that aired on the BBC Home Service on 8 February 1964.
- Jeremy Clyde voiced Raffles in the 1985–1993 BBC radio series Raffles, which included a dramatisation of the play The Return of A. J. Raffles.
- John Armstrong portrays Raffles in Raffles, the Gentleman Thief (2004–present), a series on the American radio show Imagination Theatre.

=== Television ===
- Anthony Valentine portrayed Raffles in the 1977 television series Raffles and its 1975 pilot episode.
- Alan Coates portrayed Raffles in the 1992 television film Incident at Victoria Falls, where he is encountered by Sherlock Holmes (as played by Christopher Lee).
- Nigel Havers portrayed Raffles in the 2001 television film Gentleman Thief.
- The BBC had been developing a new Raffles series, to be helmed by BAFTA winner Sukey Fisher. As of 2021, its status is unknown.
