= Anthony Valentine =

British actor (1939–2015)

- as A. J. Raffles (1977)
- Born: 17 August 1939; Blackburn, Lancashire, England
- Died: 2 December 2015 (aged 76); Guildford, Surrey, England
- Occupation: Actor
- Years active: 1949–2015
- Spouse: Susan Skipper (m. 1982)

Anthony Valentine (17 August 1939 – 2 December 2015) was an English actor best known for his television roles: the ruthless Toby Meres in Callan (1967–72), the sadistic Major Horst Mohn in Colditz (1972–74), the suave titular gentleman thief in Raffles (1977), the satanic Baron Simon de Belleme in Robin of Sherwood, and the murderous Baron Gruner in the Sherlock Holmes episode "The Illustrious Client" (1991).

== Early life and education ==
Valentine was born in Blackburn, Lancashire; he moved with his family to Chiswick, West London when he was 6 years old, going on to attend Acton County Grammar School.

== Career ==
Aged 9, Valentine was spotted tap-dancing in a stage version of Robin Hood at Ealing Town Hall. He made his professional acting debut at the age of 10 in the Nettlefold Studios film No Way Back (1949), and at the age of 12 he played a boy sleuth in The Girl on the Pier (1953). He worked regularly as a child actor for the BBC, most notably as Harry Wharton in the 1950s adaptation of Billy Bunter of Greyfriars School, having initially played Lord Mauleverer in earlier episodes.

In 1958 he appeared in a television production of Ibsen's John Gabriel Borkman, with Laurence Olivier as Borkman and Irene Worth as his wife, as part of ITV's series The Play of the Week.

Valentine's early stage credits include the premiere of Arnold Wesker's Chicken Soup with Barley (Royal Court Theatre, 1958); John Osborne's Epitaph for George Dillon (Royal Court Theatre, 1958); the Australian drama The Shifting Heart (Duke of York's Theatre, 1959, with Leo McKern); John Mortimer's Two Stars for Comfort (Garrick Theatre, 1962, with Trevor Howard); the original production of Half a Sixpence (Cambridge Theatre, 1963, with Tommy Steele); and The Platinum Cat (Wyndham's Theatre, London, 1965, with Kenneth Williams).

Valentine continued to work on stage, but he became best known for his striking performances on television: as the ruthless Toby Meres in the series Callan (1967–72), the Luftwaffe officer Major Horst Mohn in the BBC drama Colditz (1974), the eponym in Yorkshire TV's Raffles (1975-1977), and the suave crook George Webster in The Knock (1994–96).

Valentine's later stage credits include No Sex Please, We're British (Strand Theatre, 1971); Anthony Shaffer's Sleuth (St Martin's Theatre, 1972, with Marius Goring); a revival of Hans Christian Andersen (London Palladium, 1977, again with Tommy Steele); 'Art' (Wyndham's Theatre, 1999–2000); and, as Cardinal Monticelso, in Webster's The White Devil (Lyric Theatre, 2000).

Valentine made his debut as a writer and director in 1998 at The Mill at Sonning with The Waiting Game. He went on to direct regularly at the Mill, including productions of Separate Tables (2005), The Odd Couple (2009) and California Suite (2012). On 12 November 2005 Valentine became a patron of the Thwaites Empire Theatre in his birthplace, Blackburn.

He narrated three Wildlife Explorer documentary films: Powerful Predators, Animal Defences, and Weird and Wonderful. He was also the voice of Dr. X on the American heavy metal band Queensrÿche's 1988 album Operation: Mindcrime. He narrated a 1980 NOVA documentary entitled It's About Time, presented by Dudley Moore and featuring Isaac Asimov. He also recorded voiceovers for many television adverts, most notably one for Fry's Turkish Delight, with the slogan "Full of eastern promise".

== Death ==
Valentine died on 2 December 2015 in Guildford, Surrey. He had suffered from Parkinson's disease since 2012. He was survived by his wife, actress Susan Skipper. The couple married in 1982, having met during the filming of the successful Raffles television series, and later appeared together again in a television film of Ivor Novello's show The Dancing Years (1979).

Interviewed in 1995, Valentine recalled two earlier brushes with death. First, when he was dangerously ill with meningitis at the age of 26; and secondly in 1974, when caught up in the Turkish invasion of Cyprus, he was holed up for two days in a holiday hotel as gunfire raged outside. "I've always felt that everything since has been an incredible bonus," he said.

== Filmography ==
=== Film ===
Year	Title	Role	Notes
1949	No Way Back	Little Fighting Boy	
1953	The Girl on the Pier	Charlie Chubb	
1954	Adventure in the Hopfields		Uncredited
1955	The Brain Machine	Tony (Charlie's Son)	
1956	Fun at St. Fanny's	Schoolboy in Audience	Uncredited
1960	The Flesh and the Fiends	Student	Uncredited
1962	The Damned	Teddy Boy	Uncredited
1963	West 11	Man at Party	
1970	Performance	Joey Maddocks	
1972	Tower of Evil	Dr Simpson	
1976	To the Devil a Daughter	David Kennedy	
1979	Escape to Athena	SS Sturmbannführer Volkmann	
1981	The Monster Club	Mooney	(segment "Vampire Story")
1982	The Plague Dogs	Civil Servant #4	Voice
1988	A Father's Revenge	Vickers	TV movie
1988	The Dirty Dozen: The Fatal Mission	Colonel Clark	TV movie
1995	Jefferson in Paris	British Ambassador	
1995	Singapore Sling: Midnight Orchid	Morgan	TV film
1997	The House of Angelo	Lord Travers	
1998	Cuisine américaine	Wellington	
2002	Two Men Went to War	Sergeant Major Dudley	

=== Television ===
Year	Title	Role	Notes
1956-57	The Adventures of Aggie	Page Boy	1 episode
1958	Play of the Week	Erhart	Episode: "John Gabriel Borkman"
1961	Saturday Playhouse	Sub-Lieutenant Granger	Episode: "Seagulls Over Sorrento"
1961	A for Andromeda	Corporal	Episodes: "The Miracle" and "The Last Mystery"
1967-1972	Callan	Toby Meres	30 episodes
1967, 1968	The Avengers	1) George Cunliffe; 2)Calvin	1)"The Bird Who Knew Too Much"; 2)"Killer"
1969	Softly, Softly	Yob	Episode: "A Quantity of Gelignite"
1969	Dr Finlay's Casebook	Bruce Cameron	3 episodes
1969	Scobie in September	Vickers	5 episodes
1970	Department S	Gregory	Episode: "The Soup of the Day"
1970	Codename	Philip West	13 episodes
1971-1974	Justice	James Eliot	
1971	Budgie	Jeff Staines	Episode: "Grandee Hotel"
1971	Sunset Song	Rev Colquhoun	
1972	Pathfinders	Squadron Leader Jim Stanton	Episode: "One Man’s Lancaster"
1972	Z-Cars	Bright	Episodes: "Not Good Enough" (Parts 1 & 2) and "Connor"
1973	The Donati Conspiracy	Paul Frederick	
1974	Colditz	Major Horst Mohn	11 episodes
1975, 1977	Raffles	A. J. Raffles	
1975	Thriller	Garard	Episode: "The Crazy Kill"
1975	Space: 1999	Male Alien	Episode: "War Games"
1979-1983	Minder	Maurice Michaelson	
1980, 1982	Tales of the Unexpected	1) Roland Trent; 2) Bob	1) "I'll Be Seeing You"; 2) "The Absence of Emily"
1980	Hammer House of Horror	Cliff	Episode: "Carpathian Eagle"
1981	Masada a.k.a. The Antagonists	Merovius, Head Tribune	
1982	Airline	Dickie Marlowe	Episode: "Look After Number One"
1983	Bergerac	Lionel	Episode: "Prime Target"
1984	Killer	Robin	Episode: "Killer Exposed"
1984-1986	Robin of Sherwood	Baron de Belleme	Episodes: "Robin Hood and the Sorcerer - Part 1", "Robin Hood and the Sorcerer - Part 2", and "The Enchantment"
1986-1991	Lovejoy	Michael Seymour	Episodes: "The Judas Pair" and "Just Desserts"
1989	Boon	Sammy Robinson	Episodes: "Do Not Forsake Me"
1991	The House of Eliott	Victor Stride	
1991	The Case-Book of Sherlock Holmes	Baron Gruner	Episode: "The Illustrious Client"
1993	Riders	Colonel Carter	
1994, 1997	The Detectives	1) Chauffeur; 2) Grey Wolf	1) "Never Without Protection"; 2) "The Curse Of The Comanches"
1994-1996	The Knock	George Webster	
1998	The Bill	Paul Chambers	Episode: "Too Many Cooks"
2001	Waking the Dead	Patrick Mantel	Episode: "A Simple Sacrifice"
2002	New Tricks	Spitz Snr	Episode: "Creative Problem Solving"
2005	Agatha Christie's Poirot	Giovanni Gallaccio	Episode: "After the Funeral"
2005-2008	The Commander	Edward Sumpter	"Virus", "Blackdog" and "Blacklight"
2006	Heartbeat	Mac MacKenzie	Episode: "This Happy Breed"
2006	Nuremberg: Nazis on Trial	Prison Commandant Colonel Burton C. Andrus	
2007	The Last Detective	Jimmy "The Gent" Vincent	Episode: "Once Upon a Time on the Westway"
2009	Casualty	Edward	Episode: "The Price we Pay"
2009-2010	Coronation Street	George Wilson	16 episodes
