= List of works by E. W. Hornung =

E. W. Hornung bibliography
- Novels↙: 21
- Stories↙: 56
- Collections↙: 8
- Poems↙: 3
- Plays↙: 3
- Non-fiction↙: 2

Ernest William Hornung (professionally known as E. W. Hornung; 1866–1921), was an English poet and writer. From a Hungarian background, Hornung was educated at Uppingham School; as a result of poor health he left the school in December 1883 to travel to Sydney, where he stayed for two years. He returned in early 1886 when his father was dying and bankrupt, and began writing professionally shortly afterwards.

Hornung had his first work published in 1887—the short story "Stroke of Five" in Belgravia magazine. His first novel, A Bride from the Bush, was published in 1890, and Hornung used his Australian experiences as a backdrop to the story. He went on to use Australia as a setting or plot element in a further seven novels and two collections of short stories.

In 1899 The Amateur Cracksman was published, a series of short stories that introduced A. J. Raffles, a gentleman thief in late-Victorian Britain. Hornung dedicated the book to his friend, the writer Arthur Conan Doyle: "To A.C.D. This form of flattery", and the narrative form is similar to Doyle's Sherlock Holmes stories, with Raffles and his partner Bunny Manders being the criminal counterparts to Holmes and Dr. Watson. Two further short story collections and a novel followed, as did a play, Raffles, The Amateur Cracksman, first shown at the Princess Theatre, New York in 1903. It is for the character of Raffles that Hornung is best remembered.

In 1893 Hornung married Constance Doyle (1868–1924), the sister of Arthur Conan Doyle and in 1895 their son, Arthur Oscar, was born. Oscar was killed at the Second Battle of Ypres in July 1915. It marked the end of Hornung's work in fiction, and after that point he published three works of poetry—two of which were first published in The Times—and two volumes of non-fiction: a biography of his son and an account of his time working at the front line as ambulance driver, rest-station attendant and for the YMCA. Hornung's fragile constitution was further weakened by the stress of his war work. To aid his recuperation, he and his wife visited the South of France in 1921. He fell ill from influenza on the journey, and died on 22 March 1922, aged 54.

== Publications in periodicals ==
This list may be incomplete. Four Raffles stories ("Le Premier Pas", "Wilful Murder", "The Knees of the Gods", and "The Last Word") were not published in periodicals and only appeared in short story collections.

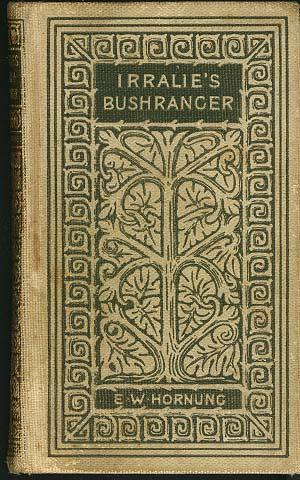
Cover of Irralie's Bushranger (1896)

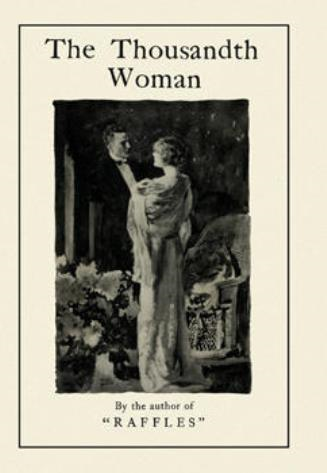
Cover of The Thousandth Woman (1913)

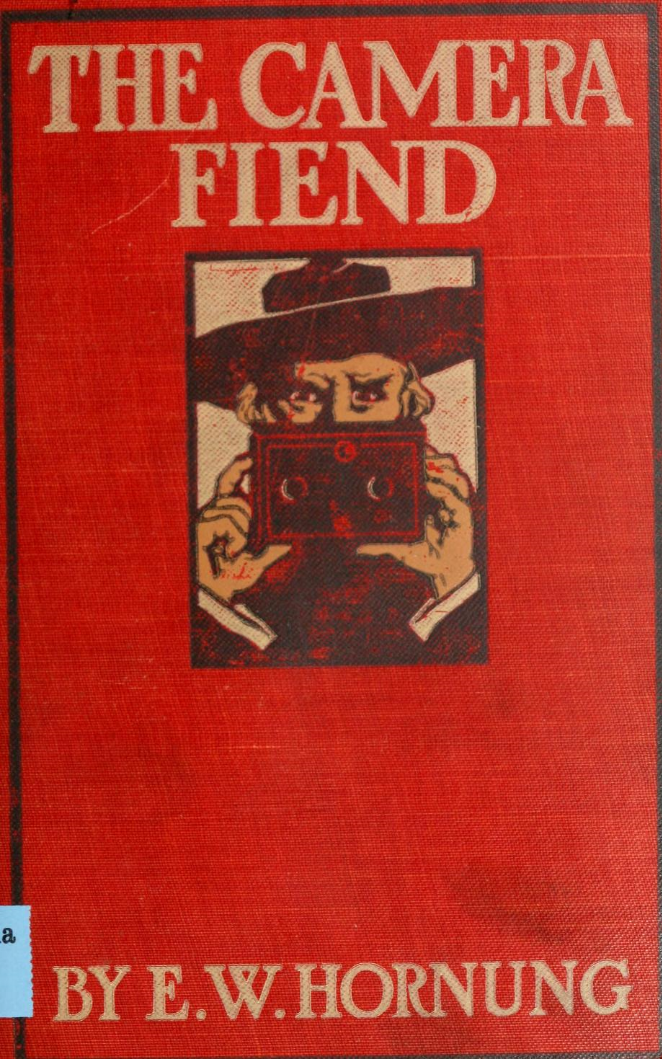
Cover of The Camera Fiend (1911)

Title	Date of publication	Periodical	Details	Ref.
"Stroke of Five"	1887	Belgravia	Vol 64, page 70; subtitled "a story"	
"Spoilt Negative"	1887	Belgravia	Vol 64, page 76; subtitled "a story"	
"Nettleship's Score"	January 1890	Cornhill Magazine	Vol 61, pages 1–25	
"A Bride From the Bush": part 1	July 1890	Cornhill Magazine	Vol 61, pages 89–112	
"A Bride From the Bush": part 2	August 1890	Cornhill Magazine	Vol 61, pages 201–24	
"A Bride From the Bush": part 3	September 1890	Cornhill Magazine	Vol 61, pages 315–36	
"A Bride From the Bush": part 4	October 1890	Cornhill Magazine	Vol 61, pages 429–48	
"A Bride From the Bush": part 5	November 1890	Cornhill Magazine	Vol 61, pages 543–60	
"The Luckiest Man in the Colony"	April 1891	The Strand Magazine	Author credited as "S. W. Hornung"	
"The Notorious Miss Anstruther"	May 1891	The Strand Magazine	–	
"Strong-Minded Miss Methuen"	March 1892	The Strand Magazine	–	
"Thunderbolt's Mate": part 1	5 March 1892	Chambers's Journal	Fifth series, vol 9, pages 154–57; subtitled "a story"	
"Thunderbolt's Mate": part 2	12 March 1892	Chambers's Journal	Fifth series, vol 9, pages 169–71; subtitled "a story"	
"Thunderbolt's Mate": part 3	19 March 1892	Chambers's Journal	Fifth series, vol 9, pages 183–86; subtitled "a story"	
"Thunderbolt's Mate": part 4	22 March 1892	Chambers's Journal	Fifth series, vol 9, pages 200–01; subtitled "a story"	
"The Romance of Sergeant Clancy"	April 1892	The Idler	–	
"Kenyon's Innings"	April 1892	Longman's Magazine	Vol 19, pages 614–37; subtitled "a story"	
"'Author! Author!'"	March 1893	The Strand Magazine	–	
"The Burrawurra Brand"	November 1893	The Idler	Vol 4, pages 349–65; subtitled "a story"	
"The Voice of Gunbar"	December 1893	Pall Mall Gazette	–	
"A Literary Coincidence"	December 1893	The Strand Magazine	–	
"The Unbidden Guest": part 1	May 1894	Longman's Magazine	Vol 24, pages 76–102	
"The Unbidden Guest": part 2	June 1894	Longman's Magazine	Vol 24, pages 191–210	
"The Unbidden Guest": part 3	July 1894	Longman's Magazine	Vol 24, pages 296–321	
"The Unbidden Guest": part 4	August 1894	Longman's Magazine	Vol 24, pages 412–32	
"The Unbidden Guest": part 5	September 1894	Longman's Magazine	Vol 24, pages 522–43	
"The Unbidden Guest": part 6	October 1894	Longman's Magazine	Vol 24, pages 628–54	
"'Galloping Jess'"	December 1894	Temple Bar	–	
"The Star of the Grasmere"	December 1894	The Strand Magazine	–	
"The Governess at Greenbush": part 1	2 February 1895	Chambers's Journal	Fifth series, vol 12, pages 74–77	
"The Governess at Greenbush": part 2	9 February 1895	Chambers's Journal	Fifth series, vol 12, pages 89–91	
"The Governess at Greenbush": part 3	16 February 1895	Chambers's Journal	Fifth series, vol 12, pages 104–07	
"The Governess at Greenbush": part 4	23 February 1895	Chambers's Journal	Fifth series, vol 12, pages 119–22	
"The Man that shot Macturk"	September 1895	Pall Mall Gazette	–	
Irralie's Bushranger	December 1895	Cassell's Family Magazine	Introduced character of Stingaree	
"After the Fact": part 1	4 January 1896	Chambers's Journal	Fifth series, vol 13, pages 6–9	
"After the Fact": part 2	11 January 1896	Chambers's Journal	Fifth series, vol 13, pages 23–26	
"After the Fact": part 3	18 January 1896	Chambers's Journal	Fifth series, vol 13, pages 55–58	
"A Demon of Revenge"	June 1897	Cassell's Family Magazine	–	
"The Ides of March"	June 1898	Cassell's Magazine	The first A. J. Raffles story	
"A Costume Piece"	July 1898	Cassell's Magazine	A. J. Raffles story	
"Gentlemen and Players"	August 1898	Cassell's Magazine	A. J. Raffles story	
"Nine Points of the Law"	September 1898	Cassell's Magazine	A. J. Raffles story	
"The Gift of the Emperor"	November 1898	Cassell's Magazine	A. J. Raffles story	
"The Return Match"	October 1898	Cassell's Magazine	A. J. Raffles story	
"A Villa in a Vineyard"	May 1899	Cassell's Magazine	Vol 79, pages 662–65	
"The Jackeroo on G Block"	April 1900	The Strand Magazine	–	
"The Saloon Passenger"	June 1900	The Strand Magazine	–	
"No Sinecure"	January 1901	Scribner's Magazine	A. J. Raffles story; Vol 29, pages 30–43; subtitled "More Adventures of the Amateur Cracksman"	
"A Jubilee Present"	February 1901	Scribner's Magazine	A. J. Raffles story; Vol 29, pages 220–31; subtitled "More Adventures of the Amateur Cracksman"	
"The Fate of Faustina"	March 1901	Scribner's Magazine	A. J. Raffles story; Vol 29, pages 227–91; subtitled "More Adventures of the Amateur Cracksman"	
"The Last Laugh"	April 1901	Scribner's Magazine	A. J. Raffles story; Vol 29, pages 483–94; subtitled "More Adventures of the Amateur Cracksman"	
"To Catch a Thief"	May 1901	Scribner's Magazine	A. J. Raffles story; Vol 29, pages 591–600; subtitled "More Adventures of the Amateur Cracksman"	
"An Old Flame"	June 1901	Scribner's Magazine	A. J. Raffles story; Vol 29, pages 707–20; subtitled "More Adventures of the Amateur Cracksman"	
"The Wrong House"	September 1901	Scribner's Magazine	A. J. Raffles story; Vol 30, pages 343–50; subtitled "More Adventures of the Amateur Cracksman"	
No Hero	January 1903	Pall Mall Magazine	Serialised January–May	
"Chrystal's Century"	June 1903	The Strand Magazine	Also published the same month in Atlantic Monthly, Vol 91, pages 738–48	
"A Voice in the Wilderness"	September 1904	The Strand Magazine	Stingaree story	
"A Bushranger at Bay"	October 1904	The Strand Magazine	Stingaree story	
"The Honour of the Road"	November 1904	The Strand Magazine	Stingaree story	
"The Black Hole of Glenranald"	December 1904	The Strand Magazine	Stingaree story	
"Out of Paradise"	January 1905	Pall Mall Magazine	A. J. Raffles story	
"The Real Simon Pure"	January 1905	The Strand Magazine	Stingaree story	
"The Chest of Silver"	February 1905	Pall Mall Magazine	A. J. Raffles story	
"To the Vile Dust"	February 1905	The Strand Magazine	Stingaree story	
"The Rest Cure"	March 1905	Pall Mall Magazine	A. J. Raffles story	
"The Villain Worshipper"	March 1905	The Strand Magazine	Stingaree story	
"The Criminologists' Club"	April 1905	Pall Mall Magazine	A. J. Raffles story	
"The Moth and the Star"	April 1905	The Strand Magazine	Stingaree story	
"The Field of Philippi"	May 1905	Pall Mall Magazine	A. J. Raffles story	
"A Bad Night"	June 1905	Pall Mall Magazine	A. J. Raffles story	
"A Trap to Catch a Cracksman"	July 1905	Pall Mall Magazine	A. J. Raffles story	
"The Spoils of Sacrilege"	August 1905	Pall Mall Magazine	A. J. Raffles story	
"The Raffles Relics"	September 1905	Pall Mall Magazine	A. J. Raffles story	
"Charles Reade"	June 1921	London Mercury	Vol 4, pages 150–63	

== Novels and story collections ==
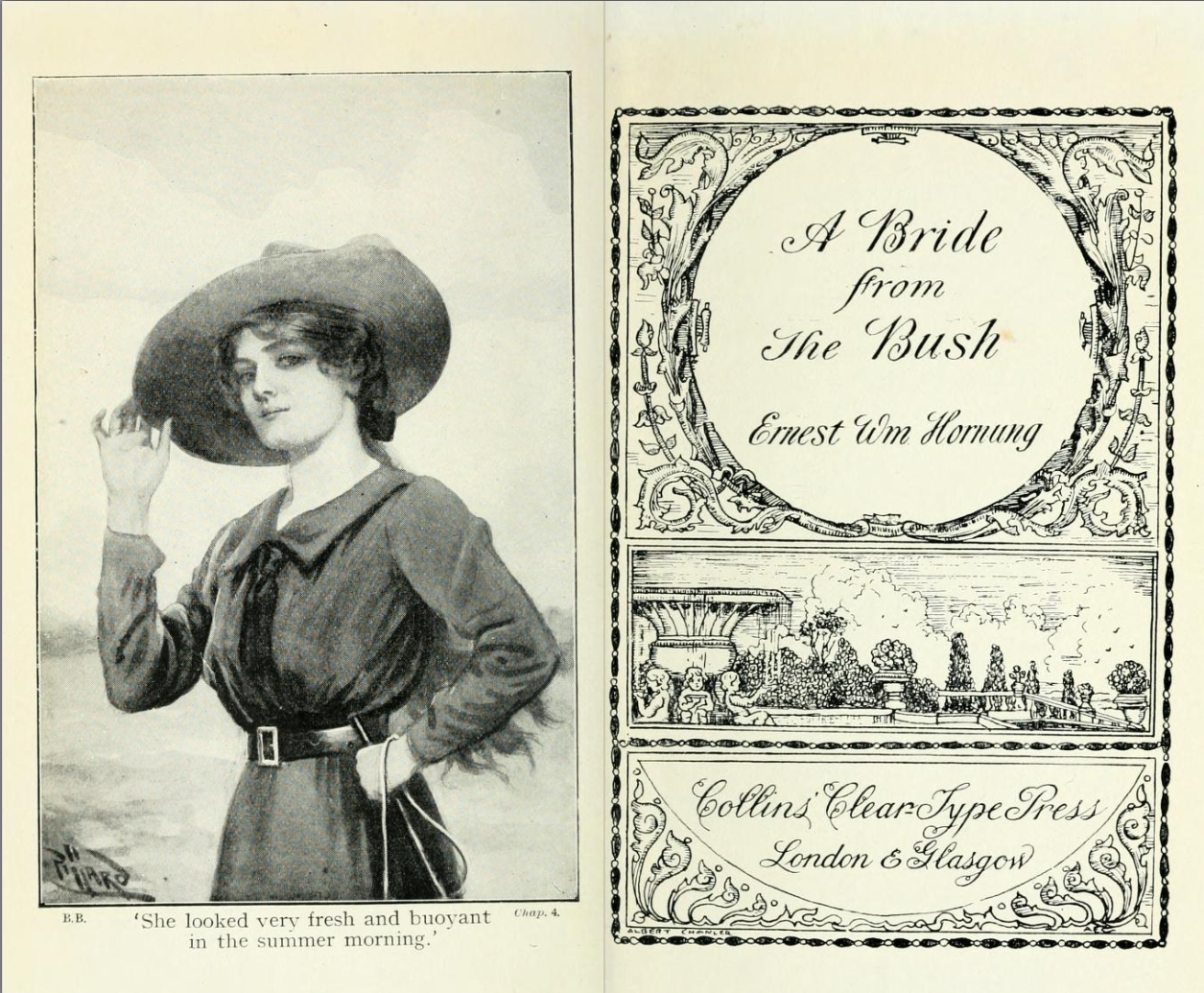
Cover from the 1890 novel A Bride from the Bush

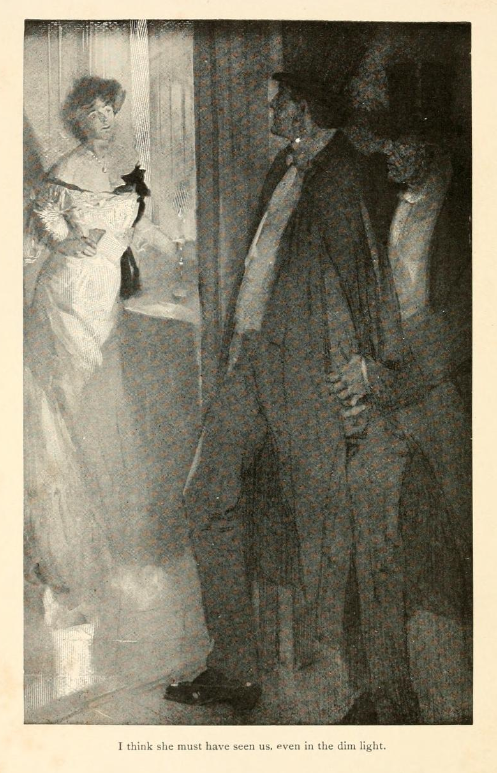
Illustration of A. J. Raffles from A Thief in the Night

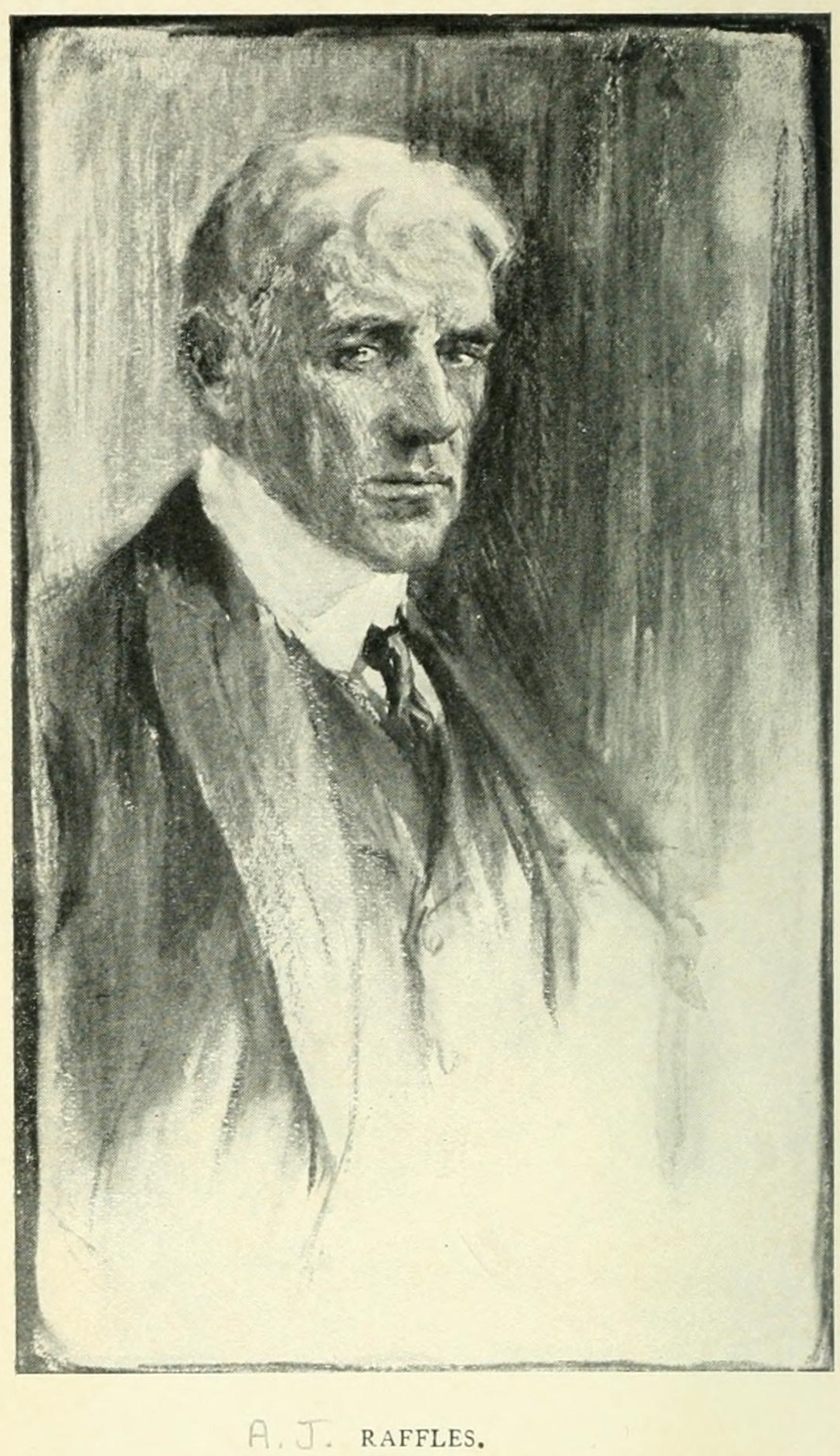
Illustration of Raffles from The Amateur Cracksman

The novels and story collections of E. W. Hornung
Title	Year of first publication (UK and US)	UK publisher	US publisher	Notes	Ref.
A Bride from the Bush	1890	Smith, Elder & Co. (London)	US Book Co. (New York)	Novel	
Under Two Skies	1892	A & C Black (London)	Macmillan & Co. (New York)	Short story collection; subtitled "a collection of stories"	
Tiny Luttrell	1893	Cassell (London)	Cassell (New York)	Novel; two volumes	
The Boss of Taroomba	1894	Bliss, Sands & Foster (London)	Scribner's (New York)	Novel; US edition first published in 1900	
The Unbidden Guest	1894	Longmans, Green & Co. (London)	Longmans (New York)	Novel	
Irralie's Bushranger	1896	Beeman (London)	Scribner's (New York)	Novel	
The Rogue's March	1896	Cassell (London)	Scribner's (New York)	Novel; subtitled "A Romance"	
My Lord Duke	1896	Cassell (London)	Scribner's (New York)	Novel; published first in the US in 1896, published in the UK in 1897	
Some Persons Unknown	1898	Cassell (London)	Scribner's (New York)	Short story collection	
Young Blood	1898	Cassell (London)	Scribner's (New York)	Novel; published in the US in 1899	
The Amateur Cracksman	1899	Methuen Publishing (London)	Scribner's (New York)	Short story collection	
Dead Men Tell No Tales	1899	Methuen Publishing (London)	Scribner's (New York)	Novel	
The Belle of Toorak	1900	Richards (London)	Scribner's (New York)	Novel; published in 1901 in the US, as The Shadow of a Man	
Peccavi	1900	Richards (London)	Scribner's (New York)	Novel	
The Black Mask	1901	Richards (London)	Scribner's (New York)	Short story collection; published in the US as Raffles: Further Adventures of the Amateur Cracksman	
At Large	1902	–	Scribner's (New York)	Novel	
The Shadow of the Rope	1902	Chatto & Windus (London)	Scribner's (New York)	Novel	
Denis Dent	1903	Isbister (London)	Stokes (New York)	Novel; subtitled "A Novel"	
No Hero	1903	Smith, Elder & Co. (London)	Scribner's (New York)	Novel	
Stingaree	1905	Chatto & Windus (London)	Scribner's (New York)	Novel	
A Thief in the Night	1905	Chatto & Windus (London)	Scribner's (New York)	Short story collection; republished as A Thief in the Night: Further Adventures of A. J. Raffles, Cricketer and Cracksman	
Raffles: The Amateur Cracksman	1906	Eveleigh Nash (London)	–	Short story collection; stories taken from The Amateur Cracksman and The Black Mask	
Mr. Justice Raffles	1909	Smith, Elder & Co. (London)	Scribner's (New York)	Novel	
The Camera Fiend	1911	Unwin (London)	Scribner's (New York)	Novel	
Fathers of Men	1912	Smith, Elder & Co. (London)	Scribner's (New York)	Novel	
The Thousandth Woman	1913	Eveleigh Nash (London)	The Bobbs-Merrill Co. (Indianapolis)	Novel	
Witching Hill	1913	Hodder & Stoughton (London)	Scribner's (New York)	Short story collection	
The Crime Doctor	1914	Eveleigh Nash (London)	–	Short story collection	
Old Offenders and a Few Old Scores	1923	John Murray (London)	–	Short story collection; published posthumously	

== Plays ==
One of Hornung's two non-fiction works, Notes of a Camp Follower (1919)

The plays of E. W. Hornung
Title	First performance	Publisher	Notes	Ref.
Raffles, The Amateur Cracksman	27 October 1903	Samuel French Ltd. (1928)	By Hornung and Eugéne Presbrey; first performed at the Princess Theatre, New York	
Stingaree, the Bushranger	1 February 1908	–	First performed at the Queen's Theatre, London	
A Visit From Raffles	1 November 1909	–	By Hornung and Charles Sansom; first performed at the Brixton Empress Theatre, London	

== Non-fiction ==
E.W. Hornung's non-fictional work
Title	Year of first publication	First edition publisher	Notes	Ref.
'Trusty and Well Beloved', The Little Record of Arthur Oscar Hornung	1915	Privately published (Colchester, Essex)	Biography of his son, killed in the First World War	
Notes of a Camp-Follower on the Western Front	1919	Constable (London)	Account of his experience with the YMCA during the First World War; US edition, published by E. P. Dutton & Co., incorporates most of the poems included in The Young Guard	

== Poetry ==
Hornung's poetry
Title	Year of first publication	First edition publisher	Category	Ref.
Ballad of Ensign Joy	1917	Dutton Books (New York)	War poetry	
Wooden Cross	1918	Nisbet (London) (Note: The poem "Wooden Crosses" was first published in The Times on 20 July 1917.)	War poetry	
The Young Guard	1919	Constable (London)	War poetry	

== Notes and references ==
Notes

== Sources ==
- Arnold, John; Hay, John A.; Batten, Sally (2001). The Bibliography of Australian Literature: F-J. Brisbane: University of Queensland Press. ISBN 978-0-7022-3500-9.
- Bloom, Harold (1995). Classic Crime and Suspense Writers. New York: Chelsea House. ISBN 978-0-7910-2206-1.
- Catalogue of Copyright Entries: Pamphlets, leaflets, contributions to newspapers or periodicals, etc.; lectures, sermons, addresses for oral delivery; dramatic compositions; maps; motion pictures. Washington, D.C.: United States Government Printing Office. 1920.
- Cox, Alison (1988). "E. W. Hornung". In Benstock, Bernard; Staley, Thomas (eds.). British Mystery Writers, 1920–1939. Detroit: Gale Research. ISBN 978-0-7876-3072-0.
- Neuburg, Victor E. (1983). The Popular Press Companion to Popular Literature. Bowling Green, Ohio: Bowling Green State University Popular Press. ISBN 978-0-87972-233-3.
- Rowland, Peter (1999). Raffles and his Creator. London: Nekta Publications. ISBN 978-0-9533583-2-8.
- Rowland, Peter (2004). "Hornung, Ernest William". Oxford Dictionary of National Biography (online ed.). Oxford University Press. doi:10.1093/ref:odnb/37572. (Subscription, Wikipedia Library access or UK public library membership required.)
- Valentine, Mark (July 2008). "E. W. Hornung: Creator of Raffles, the Gentleman Crook". The Book and Magazine Collector (296). The Metropolis Group.
