= The Return Match =

- Short story by E. W. Hornung
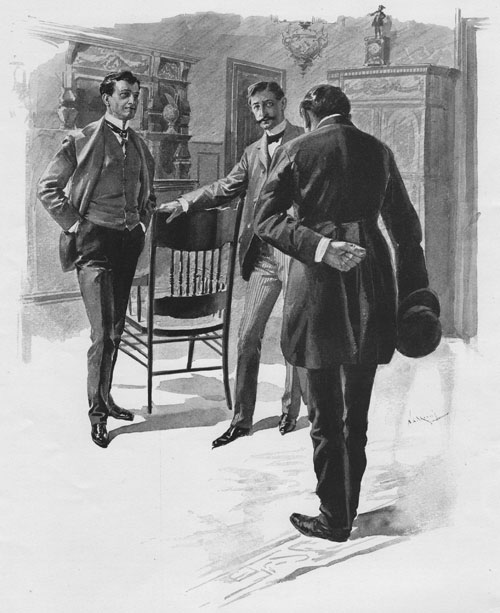
- 1898 Collier's illustration by E. V. Nadherny
- Country: United Kingdom
- Language: English
- Genre(s): Crime fiction

Publication
- Publisher: Cassell & Co
- Media type: Print (Magazine)
- Publication date: October 1898

Chronology
- Series: A. J. Raffles
Nine Points of the Law	The Gift of the Emperor

"The Return Match" is a short story by E. W. Hornung, and features the gentleman thief A. J. Raffles, and his companion and biographer, Bunny Manders. The story was first published in October 1898 by Cassell's Magazine. The story was also included as the seventh story in the collection The Amateur Cracksman, published by Methuen & Co. Ltd in London, and Charles Scribner's Sons in New York, both in 1899.

== Plot ==
Raffles brings Bunny to his Albany rooms. Raffles says the famous thief whom Raffles outsmarted during the affair of Lady Melrose's necklace, named Crawshay, was imprisoned at Dartmoor but escaped yesterday. Raffles suspects that Crawshay is coming after him, to seek revenge against Raffles. Suddenly, Crawshay enters the room.

"We must take on this job; we aren't in a position to refuse it; even if we were, I should take it on! Our friend is a great sportsman; he has got clear away from Dartmoor; it would be a thousand pities to let him go back."

— Raffles, to Bunny

Crawshay smoothly tells Raffles that Raffles must find a way to get Crawshay out of the country. Raffles acknowledges to Bunny that Crawshay is blackmailing them, but is genuinely excited to help the daring prison escapee get away. Raffles and Bunny leave, as Crawshay falls asleep.

In the courtyard, they pass Inspector Mackenzie of Scotland Yard. Despite Bunny's reservations, Raffles greets the inspector. They briefly discuss Crawshay. The inspector continues into the Albany, and Raffles and Bunny follow him.

Upon questioning by Raffles, a porter explains that police have come because a man of Crawshay's description was seen in the Albany earlier. Raffles leads Bunny into the set of rooms where several officers are investigating, Mackenzie among them. Mackenzie accepts Raffles's offer to help the police; Raffles is even glad to leave the key to his room with the police, amazing Bunny. Raffles departs, ostensibly to dinner, while Bunny remains with Mackenzie. Bunny observes Raffles's departure through the window.

While Bunny and Mackenzie are in the attic, a rope is found hanging over Raffles's window. This causes Mackenzie to begin searching Raffles's rooms. Inside, they find Raffles himself, lying on the floor on his back, and wounded by a poker in the forehead. The Raffles who departed was actually Crawshay in disguise. Bunny is tearful.

Later, Raffles reveals to Bunny that he intentionally struck himself. The day has been a success: they have won some credit with Mackenzie, and are even with Crawshay.

== Adaptations ==
=== Television ===
The story was adapted into the pilot of the Raffles television series, with Anthony Valentine as A. J. Raffles and Christopher Strauli as Bunny Manders. The episode, titled "The Amateur Cracksman", first aired on 10 September 1975.

=== Radio ===
BBC Radio adapted part of the story into the second half of the fifth episode of its Raffles radio series, "Wilful Murder or the Return Match", which first aired on 17 November 1985. The drama features Jeremy Clyde as Raffles and Michael Cochrane as Bunny. The first part of the episode is based on the events of "Wilful Murder", which then leads into the plot of "The Return Match." The episode follows much of the original plot, with some differences:

- Whereas Crawshay is wanted for escaping prison in the original story, he is wanted for murder in the drama.
- In the drama, Bunny encounters Inspector Mackenzie outside the Albany alone, investigating the murder of Baird. As opposed to Mackenzie's relative indifference to Raffles in the original story, the drama shows Mackenzie specifically interested in protecting Raffles from the threat of Crawshay's revenge, albeit with less haste than Bunny would appreciate.
- In the drama, Crawshay is already present in Raffles's flat when Bunny arrives at the Albany.
- In the drama, Raffles charges Bunny with the job of distracting Mackenzie with conversation, to give Crawshay time to get away. Bunny has no such role in the original story.
- In the original story, Mackenzie deduces from the evidence of the rope to check Raffles's flat. In the drama, he instead remembers a suspicious smell of tobacco, not the smoke of Raffles's trademark Sullivan cigarettes, in Raffles's flat.
- In the drama only, Raffles helps Crawshay take refuge in Bunny's own rooms.

An adaptation of "The Return Match" aired in 2010 as part of Raffles, the Gentleman Thief, a series on the American radio show Imagination Theatre.
