= Raffles (1939 film) =

Crime-comedy film by Sam Wood

- Directed by: Sam Wood
- Written by: John Van Druten; Sidney Howard
- Based on: The Amateur Cracksman; 1899 short story collection by E. W. Hornung
- Produced by: Samuel Goldwyn
- Starring: David Niven; Olivia de Havilland
- Cinematography: Gregg Toland
- Edited by: Sherman Todd
- Music by: Victor Young
- Production company: Samuel Goldwyn Productions
- Distributed by: United Artists
- Release date: December 29, 1939
- Running time: 72 minutes
- Country: United States
- Language: English

Raffles is a 1939 American crime comedy film starring David Niven and Olivia de Havilland, and is one of several film adaptations of an 1899 short story collection by E. W. Hornung, The Amateur Cracksman.

== Plot ==
A.J. Raffles, the celebrated cricketer, is welcomed in the parlours and country estates of high society. This circumstance he uses to his advantage in his secret career as "The Amateur Cracksman", a master burglar and safecracker who remains always one step ahead of Scotland Yard. An old school friend, Bunny Manders, reintroduces Raffles to his sister, Gwen, with whom Raffles had been infatuated a decade ago. Raffles falls in love with her all over again, and she with him. When Bunny confides a crushing gambling debt over which he is considering suicide, Raffles assures him the money can be obtained. He plans to accept a weekend invitation to the country house of Lord and Lady Melrose; Lady Melrose's famous jewelry can easily solve Bunny's problem. However, another guest is Inspector MacKenzie incognito, who strongly suspects Raffles of being the Cracksman. Raffles plots to frame a petty criminal with the theft, but keep the jewelry for himself.

== Cast ==
- David Niven as A.J. Raffles
- Olivia de Havilland as Gwen Manders
- Dame May Whitty as Kitty, Lady Melrose
- Dudley Digges as Inspector Mackenzie
- Douglas Walton as Bunny Manders
- E. E. Clive as Barraclough, Raffles' butler
- Lionel Pape as George, Lord Melrose
- Peter Godfrey as Harry Crawshay
- Gilbert Emery as Bingham
- Hilda Ploughright as Wilson, Lady Melrose's lady's maid
- Margaret Seddon as Maud Holden
- Leyland Hodgson as Bobby
- Leonard Carey as Bingham's Secretary (uncredited)
- James Finlayson as Hansom Cab Driver (uncredited)
- Gibson Gowland as Villager (uncredited)

== Source material ==
There are several differences from Hornung's short stories. The plot takes inspiration from the 1898 short story "Gentlemen and Players," in its inclusion of Inspector Mackenzie, a country house setting, and the centrality of a necklace theft. Bunny Manders, described as an only child in the series, has a sister named Gwen, who is Raffles' love interest.

The 1939 movie was based heavily on the 1930 film Raffles starring Ronald Colman, which was reported at the time as part of a larger strategy to remake Colman films starring Niven.

== Production history ==
=== Screenplay ===
Sidney Howard was given credit as co-author of the screenplay with John Van Druten, due to his having been the writer of the 1930 version. Howard had died four months prior to the release of this film. F. Scott Fitzgerald may also have worked on the script, as he is mentioned by Niven in his 2nd memoir, but Niven suggests Fitzgerald may actually have been working on his final novel, The Last Tycoon.

=== Filming ===
Olivia de Havilland, under contract with Warner Brothers at the time, was "lent" to Goldwyn for the film in April 1939.

As World War II began during filming, and Niven was a British citizen, it was rumored that the project would have to be suspended if Niven were called up for the army. Due to an accelerated schedule, by October 1939, filming had been completed and Niven left for England. It was rumored that there would be a sequel if Niven returned from England, but this film was not made.
