= A Costume Piece =

- Short story by E. W. Hornung
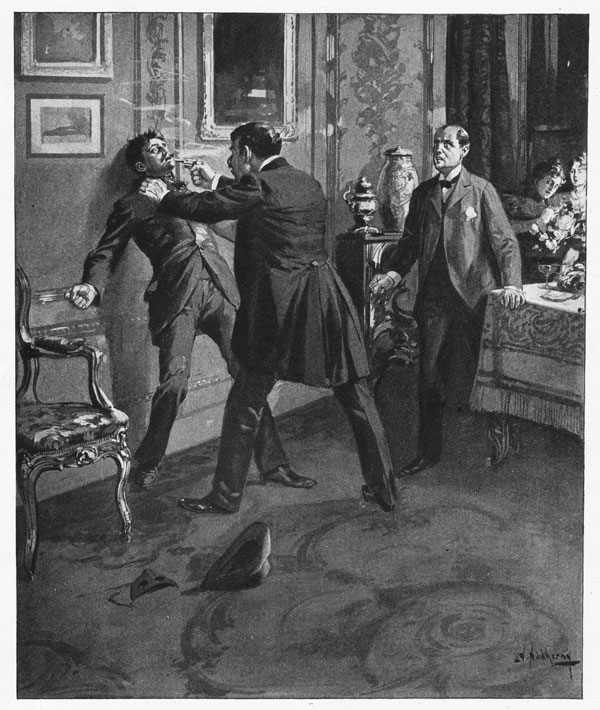
- 1898 Collier's illustration by E. V. Nadherny
- Country: United Kingdom
- Language: English
- Genre(s): Crime fiction

Publication
- Publisher: Cassell & Co
- Media type: Print (Magazine)
- Publication date: July 1898

Chronology
- Series: A. J. Raffles
The Ides of March	Gentlemen and Players

"A Costume Piece" is a short story by E. W. Hornung, and features the gentleman thief A. J. Raffles, and his companion and biographer, Bunny Manders. The story was first published in July 1898 by Cassell's Magazine. The story was also included in the collection The Amateur Cracksman, published by Methuen & Co. Ltd in London, and Charles Scribner's Sons in New York, both in 1899.

== Plot ==
Raffles visits Bunny's flat at midnight to tell him about a banquet at the Old Bohemian Club he attended earlier. The banquet was given for Reuben Rosenthall, an enormous, brutish, alcoholic millionaire who has returned to England from South Africa after making his money in diamond fields. Rosenthall boasted of his diamond stud and diamond ring, worth fifty thousand pounds together. Rosenthall also boasted Purvis, his prize-fighter bodyguard, and his readiness with his own gun. Raffles is eager to steal the diamonds.

Bunny agrees to help, though neither man is hard-up. Raffles retorts that this challenge will be for sport, not profit. Raffles will watch Rosenthall's house for a week, then return to Bunny with a plan. Bunny, irritated to be left out, is left torn between doubting the enterprise and impatiently awaiting fresh news.

During the week, Raffles tells very little to Bunny, or avoids him altogether. Offended, Bunny visits the Rosenthall house himself, in St. John's Wood. While approaching the house, Bunny is accosted by an old vagrant, who is actually a disguised Raffles. Bunny's tactlessly undisguised approach infuriates Raffles. He leads Bunny away, then chastises him for not taking more care. Bunny blames Raffles for not warning him to do so earlier. After a pause, Raffles agrees that he has been too uncommunicative. They quietly leave.

Raffles brings Bunny via omnibus to an artist's studio, on the King's Road in Chelsea. Raffles is the lawful tenant. He uses the studio for changing into and storing his disguises. He asks for Bunny's forgiveness for his secretiveness, and now informs Bunny of his plan.

They will enter the house when it is empty and try to drug Rosenthall's whiskey. Later, they will take the diamonds while Rosenthall and Purvis are intoxicated, while avoiding the ladies and the servants. To be safe, each man will bring a gun, and be disguised as a ruffian. Off-handedly, Raffles also mentions that Rosenthall was an Illicit Diamond Buyer, or I. D. B., who could go to prison if found out. Raffles turns in; Bunny goes home, but cannot sleep.

The next evening, Raffles and Bunny watch Rosenthall's house for an hour. When they see the inhabitants, Raffles and Bunny climb a wall, cross Rosenthall's lawn, and enter through an unlocked window.

No sooner had the burly pugilist obstructed his fire than Raffles was through the window at a bound; while I, for standing still and saying nothing, was scientifically felled to the floor.

— Raffles escapes and Bunny is knocked down

Suddenly, electric lights flash on. Rosenthall and Purvis are pointing revolvers at them. Rosenthall had deduced that someone was spying on him. Raffles bluffs, and declares that Purvis has let slip that Rosenthall is an I. D. B.; Purvis falls for the bluff and angrily rushes at them. Purvis blocks Rosenthall's line of fire, so that Raffles can escape through the window, while Purvis knocks down Bunny.

Bunny wakes to find that he was left alone. Rosenthall and Purvis are overheard arguing outside. Bunny flees upstairs. He hides in a bedroom's wardrobe, until he is discovered half an hour later. He is dragged downstairs, and unmasked.

Ruthlessly, Rosenthall shoves Bunny against a door, and shoots around his head, shocking the ladies present. Purvis stops him. A policeman arrives, and takes Bunny away from the house. When they are away, Bunny asks Raffles, dressed as a policeman, how he did it. Raffles answers that he fled to his artist's studio, and changed there. Moreover, he has also sent a message to Inspector Mackenzie, informing Scotland Yard to swarm the house. Ultimately, Raffles gracefully admits defeat.

== Adaptations ==
=== Television ===
The story was adapted as the second episode of the Raffles television series, with Anthony Valentine as Raffles and Christopher Strauli as Bunny. "A Costume Piece" first aired on 4 March 1977.

=== Radio ===
BBC Radio adapted the story into the third episode of its Raffles radio series, "A Costume Piece", which first aired on 3 November 1985. The drama features Jeremy Clyde as Raffles and Michael Cochrane as Bunny. The episode closely follows the plot of the original story, with some minor changes:

- In the drama, Bunny attends the club's banquet alongside Raffles, and Raffles tells Bunny of his plan while they leave the club. In the original story, Raffles visits Bunny's rooms to tell him about the banquet and his plan.
- The drama renames the original story's Billy Purvis to Samuel "Slammer" Purvis.
- In the drama, Raffles tells Bunny that he suspects Rosenthall of drugging his many Bantu servants to keep them subdued and servile. There is no mention of drugging the servants or of the Bantu peoples in the original story.
- In the drama, Bunny is not knocked unconscious by Purvis, as in the original story. Instead, he creeps out of the room to hide upstairs, while Raffles distracts Rosenthall and Purvis by escaping through the window.

"A Costume Piece" was adapted as the second episode of Raffles, the Gentleman Thief, a series on the American radio show Imagination Theatre. The episode first aired in 2004.
