= Victor Neuburg =

Victor Neuburg may refer to:

- Victor Neuburg (poet) (1883–1940), English poet, publisher and occultist
- Victor E. Neuburg (1924–1996), English academic and author
