= The Ides of March (short story) =

- Short story by E. W. Hornung
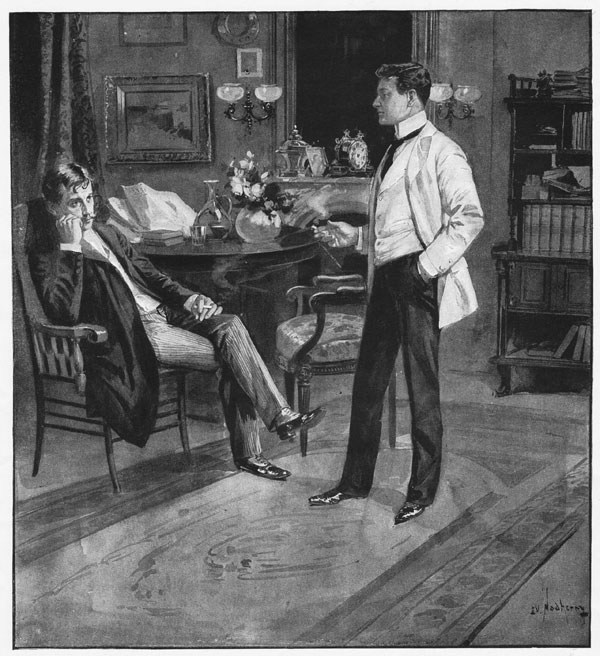
- 1898 Collier's illustration by E. V. Nadherny
- Country: United Kingdom
- Language: English
- Genre(s): Crime fiction

Publication
- Publisher: Cassell & Co
- Media type: Print (Magazine)
- Publication date: June 1898

Chronology
- Series: A. J. Raffles
—	A Costume Piece

"The Ides of March" (also published as "In the Chains of Crime") is a short story by E. W. Hornung, and the first appearance of the gentleman thief A. J. Raffles, and his companion and biographer, Bunny Manders. The story was first published in June 1898 by Cassell's Magazine. The story was also included in the collection The Amateur Cracksman, published by Methuen & Co. Ltd in London, and Charles Scribner's Sons in New York, both in 1899.

== Plot ==
=== Part one ===
"Bunny" Manders returns to the flat in the Albany where he just lost over two hundred pounds in a game of baccarat, earlier that evening. The famous cricketer A. J. Raffles, who lives there and who Bunny once fagged for at school, greets him. Bunny confesses to Raffles that he is hopelessly in debt. The checks he wrote for Raffles and the others are worthless. When Raffles does not express sympathy, Bunny tries to leave. Raffles detains him. Agitated, Bunny raises a pistol to his head to kill himself. However, Raffles unexpectedly admires the bold move, which stymies Bunny.

"Do you see what day it is?" he added, tearing a leaflet from a Shakespearian calendar, as I drained my glass. "March 15th. 'The Ides of March, the Ides of March, remember.' Eh, Bunny, my boy? You won't forget them, will you?"

— Raffles, before bringing Bunny to Bond Street

Raffles promises to help Bunny. He takes away Bunny's gun. However, Raffles is also hard-up; he and Bunny must now work together to find income. Bunny is astonished, but eagerly agrees to the partnership. Bunny recalls how he had helped Raffles break curfew at school; Raffles remembers this also. Raffles leaves with Bunny, ostensibly to ask for money from a friend of his.

=== Part two ===
Raffles brings Bunny to the unnamed friend's flat in Bond Street, which sits above a jeweler's shop. Bunny is reluctant, but with his own key Raffles leads him into the dark flat. Raffles takes Bunny quietly upstairs, then lights a match. Abruptly Bunny sees that the house is empty. The truth is revealed: there is no friend. Raffles is actually planning to burgle the shop of the jeweler, named Danby, underneath. Though Bunny is shocked to learn that Raffles is a burglar, he reaffirms his commitment to Raffles.

Raffles takes Bunny to the cellar, then across an outside yard to a door that Raffles forces open with a jimmy. They ascend more stairs, to another door. Raffles uses a brace and drill bit to cut around the lock. He slips his arm through and picks the iron gate behind the door with a skeleton key.

Next is an empty lobby, separated from the shop by an iron curtain. The curtain will be noisy to remove. Raffles asks Bunny to return to the empty room above, and beat the floor to communicate when the street is clear. Bunny signals when a policeman and a watchman pass by outside. Later, Bunny returns to Raffles, who has pocketed some of the shop's valuables, some port, and cigars. They clean themselves in the shop's lavatory and leave.

At the Albany, Raffles cajoles Bunny into promising to stand by Raffles for future crimes.

== Publication history ==
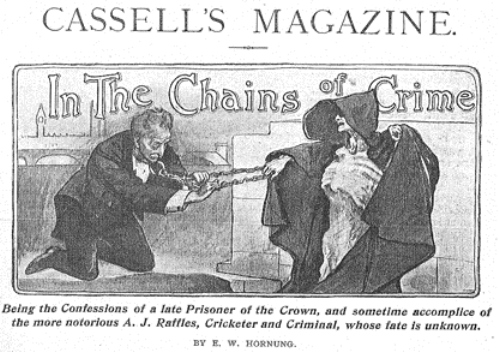
Illustration for "In the Chains of Crime" in the June 1898 issue of Cassell's Magazine.

When printed in Cassell's Magazine, the story was renamed to "In the Chains of Crime". It included an introduction clarifying that Bunny was presently a prisoner, as well as an illustration showing Bunny Manders being dragged by a skeleton in cloak and hood. The magazine was hesitant to publish a story that featured criminals as the protagonists, and these changes were intended to make it clear that it was a cautionary tale. Cassell's would reprint this same illustration in each of its six Raffles issues.

== Adaptations ==
=== Television ===
The story was adapted into the first episode of the Raffles television series, with Anthony Valentine as A. J. Raffles and Christopher Strauli as Bunny Manders. The episode, titled "The First Step", first aired on 25 February 1977.

=== Radio ===
BBC Radio adapted the story into the first episode of its Raffles radio series, "The Ides of March", which first aired on 20 October 1985. The drama features Jeremy Clyde as Raffles and Michael Cochrane as Bunny. The episode closely follows the plot of the original story, with some changes, including:

- In the original story, Raffles hosted the game of baccarat. In the radio drama, the game is hosted by a different man in another room in the Albany, and Raffles takes no part.
- In the original story, Bunny threatens to kill himself with a pistol. In the radio drama, Bunny goes to Waterloo Bridge with the aim of throwing himself into the Thames.
- In the drama only, Raffles injures his hands with the iron curtain.
- In the drama, the constable and watchman block the exit, and Bunny uses a rope to lower the injured Raffles and himself down a window, similar to how he had lowered and raised the rope for Raffles at school.

"The Ides of March" was adapted as the first episode of Raffles, the Gentleman Thief, a series on the American radio show Imagination Theatre. The episode first aired in 2004.
