= Nine Points of the Law =

- Short story by E. W. Hornung
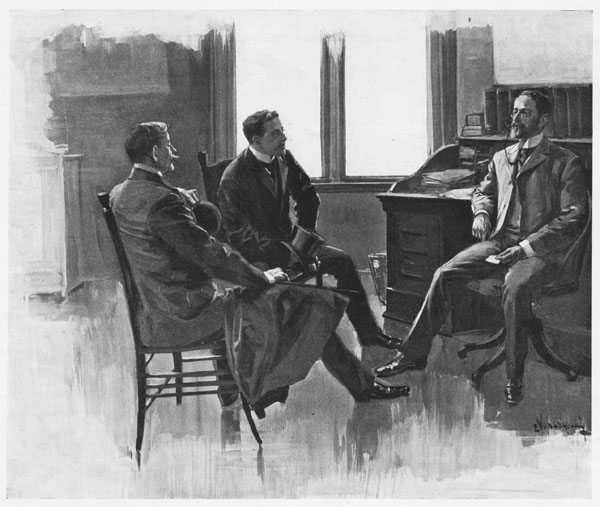
- 1898 Collier's illustration by E. V. Nadherny
- Country: United Kingdom
- Language: English
- Genre(s): Crime fiction

Publication
- Publisher: Cassell & Co
- Media type: Print (Magazine)
- Publication date: September 1898

Chronology
- Series: A. J. Raffles
Wilful Murder	The Return Match

"Nine Points of the Law" is a short story by E. W. Hornung, and features the gentleman thief A. J. Raffles, and his companion and biographer, Bunny Manders. The story was first published in September 1898 by Cassell's Magazine. The story was also included as the six story in the collection The Amateur Cracksman, published by Methuen & Co. Ltd in London, and Charles Scribner's Sons in New York, both in 1899.

== Plot ==
Raffles shows Bunny a remarkable advertisement in The Daily Telegraph offering two thousand pounds for an unspecified task. Raffles has answered it under a false name. That moment, a replying telegram arrives, from a famously shady lawyer named Addenbrooke. Raffles takes Bunny to Addenbrooke's offices in Wellington Street, Strand.

"I said I wanted that thousand pounds; my friend here wants the other. We are both cursedly hard up, and we go into this thing together or not at all."

— Raffles, to Addenbrooke

The lawyer meets them, but recognizes Raffles. Raffles insists that both he and Bunny are in need of money. Addenbrooke, now reluctant, informs them of the illicit job: to take back his client's priceless Velasquez painting, which has been falsely sold by the client's miscreant son for a paltry five thousand pounds, while avoiding public scandal. Raffles argues the reward should be doubled; ultimately they agree to double-or-nothing. The three men lunch at the Café Royal. Raffles asks Addenbrooke to send word to Sir Bernard, and then leaves for a train to Sir Bernard in Esher. Later, Bunny receives word from Raffles to be ready tomorrow.

The next day, Raffles tells Bunny he learned from Sir Bernard that there is one copy of the painting in the country. He also pretended to want to buy the painting from the original buyer, Craggs, so that Craggs would show it to him. Raffles asks Bunny to dine with Craggs that evening, to distract him while Raffles burgles the map-case. Raffles leaves, and Bunny spends the remaining hours preparing his conversational skills.

A nervous Bunny arrives at Craggs's rooms in the Métropole hotel. Craggs's conversation over dinner is disagreeable. After dinner, Craggs discusses the Velasquez painting, and invites Bunny to see it. Bunny is unable to stop him. Craggs shows Bunny the painting, still in its map-case. Bunny is astounded: Raffles has evidently failed.

Bunny returns home by cab, only to go to the hotel again within minutes. Using a stolen key, Bunny reenters and finds Craggs asleep. Bunny chloroforms him and takes the painting. He hides it under his coat and leaves by train to Esher. Bunny is terrified, and then triumphant.

Bunny meets Raffles at Sir Bernard's, and shows him the painting. Raffles, however, grimly informs Bunny that he has just stolen the copy that Raffles had swapped the genuine article for. Bunny is aghast, but Sir Bernard is satisfied. In the end, Bunny is exasperated by the affair, yet Raffles is thoroughly impressed by the boldness that Bunny demonstrated.

== Adaptations ==
BBC Radio adapted the story into the fourth episode of its Raffles radio series, "A Costume Piece", which first aired on 10 November 1985. The drama features Jeremy Clyde as Raffles and Michael Cochrane as Bunny. The episode closely follows the plot of the original story, with some minor changes:

- In the drama, there are no copies of the painting for Raffles to procure. Instead, Raffles borrows an engraving of the painting from Addenbrooke and uses it as a reference to paint his own copy, within the two days of the adventure.
- In the drama only, Raffles appreciates the beauty of the painting to a greater degree. He briefly contemplates keeping the painting and disregarding Addenbrooke's mission altogether. He even decides to keep his own copy of the painting on display in his Albany rooms, above his mantelpiece.
- In the drama, Raffles has already had the duplicate map-case key made before visiting Bunny to tell him of the night's plan. Consequently, Bunny is given no excuse at all of what will be occupying Raffles's time until the burglary attempt.
- In the drama, in order to steal the painting, Bunny deliberately drinks Craggs under the table, and takes the painting while Craggs is incapacitated. Bunny secretly tosses out half of his own drink in order to win, though he still gets heavily drunk.

An adaptation of "Nine Points of the Law" aired in 2007 as part of Raffles, the Gentleman Thief, a series on the American radio show Imagination Theatre.
