= Le Premier Pas =

- Short story by E. W. Hornung
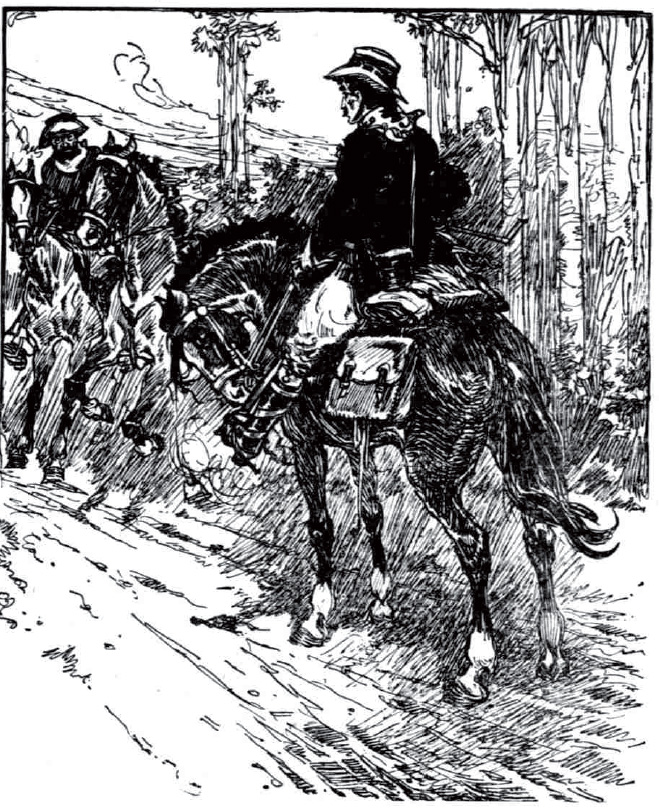
- 1899 illustration by Frank Parker
- Country: United Kingdom
- Language: English
- Genre(s): Crime fiction

Publication
- Publisher: Methuen Publishing
- Media type: Print (Collection)
- Publication date: August 1899

Chronology
- Series: A. J. Raffles
Gentlemen and Players	Wilful Murder

"Le Premier Pas" is a short story by E. W. Hornung, and features the gentleman thief A. J. Raffles, and his companion and biographer, Bunny Manders. The story was first published as the fourth story in the collection The Amateur Cracksman, published by Methuen & Co. Ltd in London, and Charles Scribner's Sons in New York, both in 1899. This and "Wilful Murder" were the two stories in the collection not published previously in magazine format.

== Plot ==
Raffles and Bunny are together at the Albany. Raffles decides to finally tell Bunny the tale of his first crime:

Raffles is in Melbourne for the Test match, and runs into debt. He is removed from play for some days due to a hand injury; the surgeon who attends him mentions there is a man named Raffles who is manager at a bank, recently promoted to a new location in Yea. Raffles supposes the man may be a long-lost relative, and may be of help to him. The doctor loans Raffles his horse. After writing to the other Raffles in spite of his wounded hand, Raffles rides through Whittlesea. Along the way, he comes upon an eerily riderless horse, followed by a horse with a suspicious rider; the rider lies to the naive Raffles about the fastest path to Yea.

Upon arriving late in the township, Raffles is met by a bank manager, who was awaiting him. The man warns him of bushrangers. He leads Raffles to the bank, and presents to him the letter that Raffles wrote his potential relative the previous day. Raffles realizes that he and this man have each mistaken each other for the other Raffles. Raffles maintains the ruse.

"Before I tasted my soup I had decided what to do. I had determined to rob that bank instead of going to bed, and to be back in Melbourne for breakfast if the doctor's mare could do it."

— Raffles, deciding to burgle the bank

Over dinner with the man, named Ewbank, Raffles contemplates robbing the bank. While cleverly maintaining his ruse, Raffles learns the details of the bank from Ewbank. After dinner, Raffles persuades Ewbank to show him around. They retire. When he hears Ewbank snoring, Raffles exits the bank to prepare his horse for a speedy departure. He reenters and uses the secret strong-room keys to enters the strong-room. He takes a couple hundred sovereigns. Suddenly, there is a knocking at the bank's door.

Raffles, who brought a revolver, goes to meet the threat, but retreats at the sound Ewbank's approach. Ewbank lets in the newcomer, who has been abused by bushrangers. He is the real Raffles who Ewbank was expecting. Together they realize that the first Raffles to arrive is an imposter, and probably one of the bushrangers. They search for him. Raffles silently closes the store-room door, just in time to not be seen. Raffles waits for them to move on upstairs, and flees on his horse to a hotel in Melbourne. Raffles's loss of innocence is marked by him shaving off his heavy moustache. He later returns the horse to the doctor.

== Adaptations ==
BBC Radio did not adapt "Le Premier Pas" as part of its Raffles radio series.

"Le Premier Pas" was adapted for radio as the sixth episode of Raffles, the Gentleman Thief, a series on the American radio show Imagination Theatre. The episode first aired in 2005.
