= Wilful Murder (short story) =

- Short story by E. W. Hornung
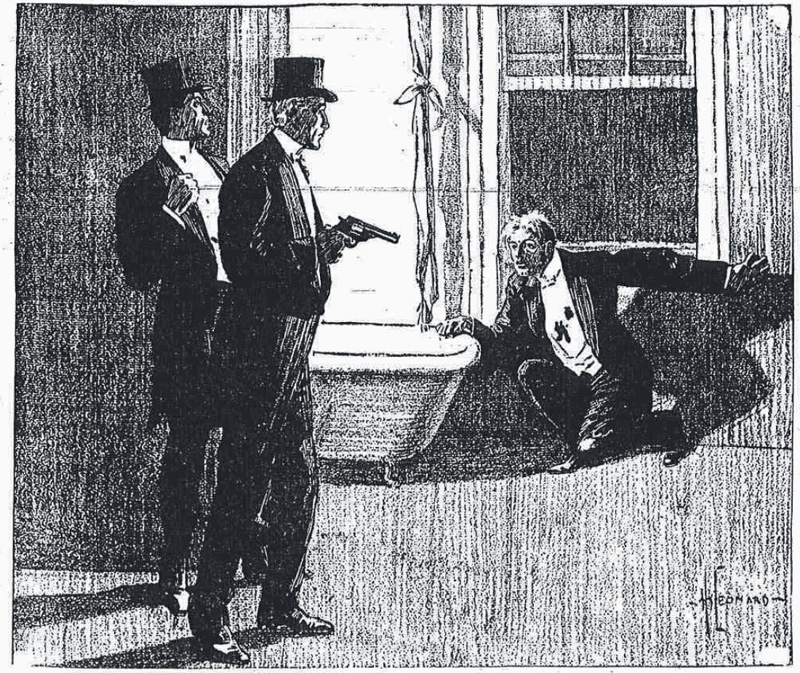
- 1899 illustration by Hy Leonard
- Country: United Kingdom
- Language: English
- Genre(s): Crime fiction

Publication
- Publisher: Methuen Publishing
- Media type: Print (Collection)
- Publication date: August 1899

Chronology
- Series: A. J. Raffles
Le Premier Pas	Nine Points of the Law

"Wilful Murder" is a short story by E. W. Hornung, and features the gentleman thief A. J. Raffles, and his companion and biographer, Bunny Manders. The story was first published as the fifth part of the collection The Amateur Cracksman, published by Methuen & Co. Ltd in London, and Charles Scribner's Sons in New York, both in 1899. This and "Le Premier Pas" were the two stories in the collection not published previously in magazine format.

== Plot ==
Raffles and Bunny have just returned from Ireland, and Bunny anxiously waits in his rooms for Raffles to sell the emeralds they have stolen to Baird, a moneylender who is Raffles's fence. Raffles arrives, having sold the emeralds; however, Baird seems to have deduced that the disguised Raffles is actually a gentleman. Baird secretly followed Raffles back to his artist's studio, though Raffles has shaken him off. Raffles and Bunny leave to the Albany.

On the way, in Bond Street, they pass by Jack Rutter, an unfortunate drunkard who Baird has ruined financially.

"A fine game for him to play, a game after his mean old heart: blackmail from me, bribes from the police, the one bidding against the other; but he sha'n't play it with me, he sha'n't live to, and the world will have an extortioner the less."

— Raffles, about Baird

Shortly after, Raffles and Bunny dine at a club. While in the smoking room, Raffles contemplates murder. Raffles explains to Bunny that he had lied earlier; Baird had, in fact, followed them to the Albany, and now knows Raffles's secret. Baird obviously plans to blackmail Raffles and Raffles decides that Baird must be killed. Bunny abhors murder, but resolves to go with Raffles to Baird.

After another stop at the Albany, Raffles and Bunny take a train and walk to Baird's house in Kensal Rise. The house is highly barricaded. Raffles covers the spikes of a gate with corks and his coat, and both he and Bunny climb over. They see a light inside the house, and hear stairs creak. With Bunny's assistance, Raffles silently cuts open the glass door using a diamond, treacle, and brown paper. Using the hole, Raffles turns the door's key and draws the bolt. They enter; instantly, Raffles almost trips over something. A gaslight reveals the dead, blood-soaked body of Baird. Raffles and Bunny are shocked. Then, Bunny remembers the light from earlier. They go upstairs to search for the culprit. Raffles kicks open a locked door and they find Jack Rutter, about to escape through the window.

Rutter, surprised by them, confesses to the murder. He had passed by Baird earlier in Bond Street. Baird, seeing Rutter and Raffles speak to one another, demanded information on Raffles from Rutter; Rutter persuaded Baird to first take him to Baird's house. Once there, Rutter eventually threatened Baird with a poker. Baird fired on Rutter with a revolver. Rutter dodged, and killed Baird. Rutter wants to turn himself in, but Raffles is determined to save all three of them. He and Bunny drag Rutter away; by foot and by cab, they return to Bunny's rooms. Raffles then takes Rutter to the Chelsea studio, and packs Rutter safely on a ship to New York.

== Influence ==
"Wilful Murder" inspired the Sherlock Holmes story "The Adventure of Charles Augustus Milverton" (by Hornung's brother-in-law, Arthur Conan Doyle), though there are significant differences between the stories.

== Adaptations ==
BBC Radio adapted part of the story into the fifth episode of its Raffles radio series, "Wilful Murder or The Return Match", which first aired on 17 November 1985. The drama features Jeremy Clyde as Raffles and Michael Cochrane as Bunny. The first half of the episode follows many elements of the original story, with some changes:

- In the drama, there is no Jack Rutter, and Baird doesn't encounter anyone while following Raffles. Accordingly, Baird follows Raffles and Bunny all the way to their club, and even asks about them there. The murder itself will eventually be committed instead by Crawshay, who flees the scene of the crime alone.
- In the drama, Bunny mentions "Holmes, the Baker Street detective" as a potential adversary for Raffles.

The eighth episode of Raffles, the Gentleman Thief, a series on the American radio show Imagination Theatre, was adapted from the story. The episode first aired in 2005.
