= Witching Hill =

Book by Ernest William Hornung

- First edition
- Author: E. W. Hornung
- Illustrator: F. C. Yohn (US)
- Language: English
- Genre: Thriller
- Publisher: Hodder & Stoughton
- Publication date: February 1913
- Publication place: United Kingdom
- Media type: Print (Book)
- OCLC: 4119543

Witching Hill is a collection of short stories by E. W. Hornung. Its eight individual stories were first serialized in Scribner's Magazine from February to September 1912. The collection was published in February 1913 by Hodder & Stoughton, in London.

The stories revolve around the apparently supernatural happenings that occur on the housing estate of Witching Hill, and the combined efforts of the estate's clerk, Gillon, and a resident, Delavoye, to manage them.

== Plot ==
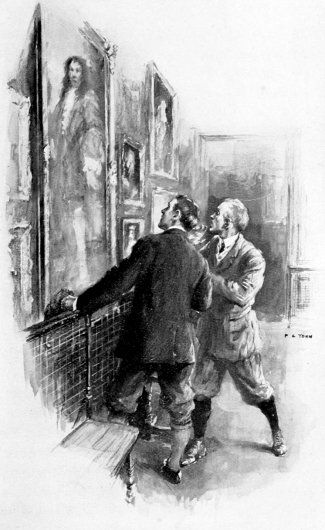
Delavoye, Gillon, and a painting of Lord Mulcaster, 1913 illustration by F. C. Yohn

Mr. Gillon is an athletic youth bored by his stale job as clerk at the Witching Hill Estate Office, which manages the properties along Witching Hill Road. One day, however, Uvo Delavoye, a fascinating and energetic young man despite his ongoing recovery from a tropical illness, asks Gillon to have a look at hole that has appeared overnight in his mother's backyard. Together they investigate and find a tunnel, which leads to the estate's largest house. There, they secretly witness the famously pious owner, Sir Christopher Stainsby, hosting a drunken party. Delavoye blames the party's wild behaviour on the influence of his wicked ancestor, Lord Mulcaster, who once owned all of Witching Hill.

Gillon and Delavoye become close friends, despite Gillon's refusal to believe in Delavoye's superstitions, and they spend the next three years contending with apparently supernatural events. For their second adventure, they investigate the honest lawyer Abercromby Royle who has turned dishonest and strange. Thirdly, they help the inoffensive accountant Guy Berridge who suffers from impulses of attacking his fiancée. Fourthly, they suppress the profane story inexplicably written by the reverend's courteous sister, Julia Brabazon.

Fifthly, they support Coplestone, a retired oarsman and widower, when his likable son Ronnie falls ill. Sixthly, army-crammer Colonel Arthurs Cheffins gifts Delavoye a revolver as recompense for almost shooting Delavoye, and Delavoye becomes obsessed with the firearm. Seventhly, the former public school master Edgar Nettleton sets his house on fire, and Delavoye begins to fear that it his own tainted presence that is the cause of not only Nettleton's madness but also the other events thus far.

"You were great friends, Mr. Gillon, weren't you?"
"We are, and I hope we always shall be."
"It must have been everything for you to have such a friend in such a place!"
"It was so! I stayed on and on because of him. He was the life and soul of the Estate to me."

— Mrs. Ricardo asks Gillon about his connection to Delavoye

Finally, Gillon leaves Witching Hill for a year of military service. Afterwards, he returns, weakened by enteric fever, to visit Delavoye. Delavoye, now a journalist, introduces Gillon to the pleasant Mrs. Ricardo, and her unpleasant husband Captain Ricardo. Later, Gillon encounters Mrs. Ricardo at the ruins of a Temple of Bacchus in the woods, and discusses Delavoye with her.

One night, Gillon visits the woods looking for Delavoye, but spies Mr. Ricardo. Gillon trails him to the ruins, where both men eavesdrop on Mrs. Ricardo and Delavoye. Mrs. Ricardo wants to have an affair, but Delavoye insists against it; in fact, Delavoye asserts that their iniquitous impulses are the result of the curse of Lord Mulcaster's descendant. Delavoye sadly declares that he must leave her. Gillon and Mr. Ricardo are impressed.

At Delavoye's house, Gillon asks Delavoye to come away with him somewhere up north. Delavoye agrees to. He adds that his ancestor's spirit will not trouble Witching Hill any longer.

== Background ==
According to one biographer of Hornung, the partnership between the two main characters, Delavoye and Gillon, was a reimagining of the partnership of Hornung's two most famous characters, A. J. Raffles and Bunny Manders.
