= The Gift of the Emperor =

- Short story by E. W. Hornung
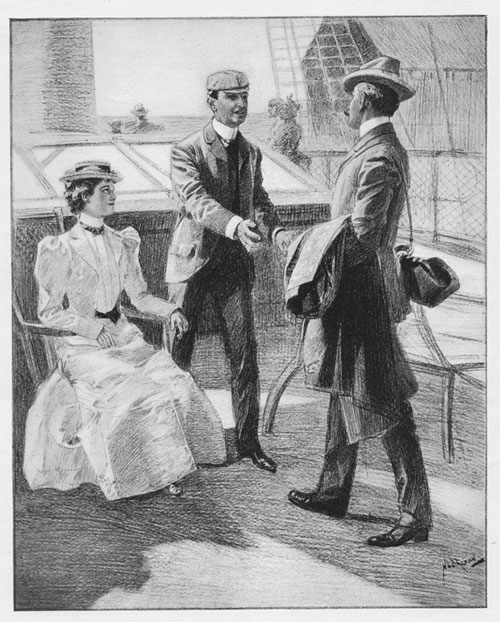
- 1898 Collier's illustration by E. V. Nadherny
- Country: United Kingdom
- Language: English
- Genre: Crime fiction

Publication
- Publisher: Cassell & Co
- Media type: Print (Magazine)
- Publication date: November 1898

Chronology
- Series: A. J. Raffles
The Return Match	No Sinecure

"The Gift of the Emperor" is a short story by E. W. Hornung, and features the gentleman thief A. J. Raffles, and his companion and biographer, Bunny Manders. The story was first published in October 1898 by Cassell's Magazine. The story was also included as the eighth and last story in the collection The Amateur Cracksman, published by Methuen & Co. Ltd in London, and Charles Scribner's Sons in New York, both in 1899.

The events in the story lead to the eventual exposure of Raffles as a thief and contribute significantly to his cynicism about British High Society.

== Plot ==
=== Part one ===
Bunny is struggling to earn an honest living as a journalist. He writes an article about a priceless pearl to be given by a European emperor to Queen Victoria. While boating with Raffles on the Thames, Raffles invites Bunny on a sea voyage for Italy.

Later, when Bunny boards their ship at Southampton, however, he discovers Raffles talking to a lady, Miss Werner.

In private, Raffles tells Bunny of his plan to steal the emperor's pearl from a German officer, Captain von Heumann, on the ship. Raffles fears that Bunny has turned too honest, but Bunny confesses that honest living has failed him.

=== Part two ===
I confess to some little prejudice against her. I resented her success with Raffles, of whom, in consequence, I saw less and less each day. It is a mean thing to have to confess, but there must have been something not unlike jealousy rankling within me.

— Bunny, about Miss Werner

Bunny is jealous of the attention Raffles pays daily to Miss Werner. Meanwhile, Raffles insists that he and Bunny share one particular cabin.

One afternoon, Raffles reveals his plan to Bunny. With Bunny's help, Raffles will climb through the vent in their room's wall, which leads to von Heumann's cabin. The exact location of the pearl was told to him by Miss Werner, who learned it from von Heumann, who is a rival for her affections. Raffles's true feelings about Miss Werner remain ambiguous.

=== Part three ===
Very early morning, Raffles squeezes through the vent, chloroforms the sleeping von Heumann, and takes the pearl. Bunny wants to disembark immediately with the pearl; Raffles insists they stay.

Later that day, Inspector Mackenzie boards the ship. Soon after, Raffles and Bunny are summoned by the captain, the chief officer, Mackenzie, and von Heumann. Not only has Mackenzie seen through Raffles's vent trick, but he also presents his warrant to arrest Raffles for past burglaries. Defeated, Raffles confesses that the pearl is hidden in one of his revolver's cartridges. Raffles pleads to be allowed to say good-bye to Miss Werner, whom he has asked to marry. He hastily begs Bunny's forgiveness, then goes to talk to Miss Werner. In doing so, however, Raffles dives into the water, escaping.

Ultimately, Bunny is imprisoned and ruined. Raffles's fate remains uncertain.

== Adaptations ==
=== Television ===
The story was adapted for the 1977 Raffles television series, though the plot was changed significantly. An envoy of the German Emperor Wilhelm II arrives in London, on his way to the South Sea. He is carrying a precious pearl which he is due to present as a gift to a local King. This is regarded with horror in London, by those who regard it as a German attempt to interfere in a British sphere of influence.

Eager to avert this potentially embarrassing situation, a Foreign Office official approaches Gentleman thief A. J. Raffles to steal it back from him while he is in England, staying at a country house. Raffles agrees provided he is permitted to keep the pearl, valued at an estimated £100,000. He travels out to stay at the house with his companion Bunny Manders and waits for a chance to steal the pearl.

He is assisted by Inspector Mackenzie, his long-term rival, who has been ordered by his superiors to aid Raffles. Shunning his help, Raffles successfully manages to steal the pearl by climbing down a chimney and evades an attempt by the Germans to recover it. Raffles ultimately is betrayed by the foreign office official who has Raffles has arrested for the theft, and the pearls are sent back to Germany in exchange for an agreement that they will not be given to the Pacific King. The story ends with Raffles not being exposed as a criminal to the public. He continues to live as a member of High Society.

=== Radio ===
BBC Radio adapted the story into the twelfth episode of its Raffles radio drama, "A Gift of the Emperor", which first aired on 6 July 1988. The drama features Jeremy Clyde as Raffles and Michael Cochrane as Bunny. The plot follows that of the original story with some minor changes:

- Bunny begins the episode by quoting the first line written by Dr. John Watson from "The Final Problem", the short story by Sir Arthur Conan Doyle which features the apparent demise of Sherlock Holmes. The line is, "It is with a heavy heart that I take up my pen to write these the last words in which I shall ever record the singular gifts by which my friend Mr. Sherlock Holmes was distinguished." Bunny only replaces the words "Mr. Sherlock Holmes" with "A. J. Raffles".
- Bunny begins very financially well-off in the episode.
- Unlike the original story's ladylike Miss Werner, Miss Werner is obnoxious and unlikeable in the drama. Raffles makes it clear that he is only using her.
- In the original story, Raffles strips all of his clothes before entering the vent. In the drama, he reluctantly keeps his clothes on, in case of any sudden need to be dressed.
- In the drama, Raffles tries to bargain away the pearl to Inspector Mackenzie, in exchange for Bunny's release. Failing that, he then threatens to destroy the pearl, to no avail.
- In the original story, Raffles bids Bunny to keep the mate away so that Raffles can escape. In the drama, Raffles instead creates a distraction by pushing Miss Werner overboard.
