= Longman's Magazine =

Defunct literary magazine published in the United Kingdom

Longman's Magazine was first published in November 1882 by C. J. Longman, publisher of Longmans, Green & Co. of London. It superseded Fraser's Magazine (published 1830 to 1882). A total of 276 monthly issues had been published when the last number came out in October 1905.

Longman's focused on fiction, debuting work by James Payn, Margaret Oliphant, Thomas Hardy, Henry James, Edith Nesbit, Frank Anstey, Robert Louis Stevenson, H. Rider Haggard, Rudyard Kipling, Walter Besant, and others.

The magazine is closely associated with one of its editors, Andrew Lang, who contributed a column called "At the Sign of the Ship" for many years.
