= A Bride from the Bush =

1890 novel by E. W. Hornung

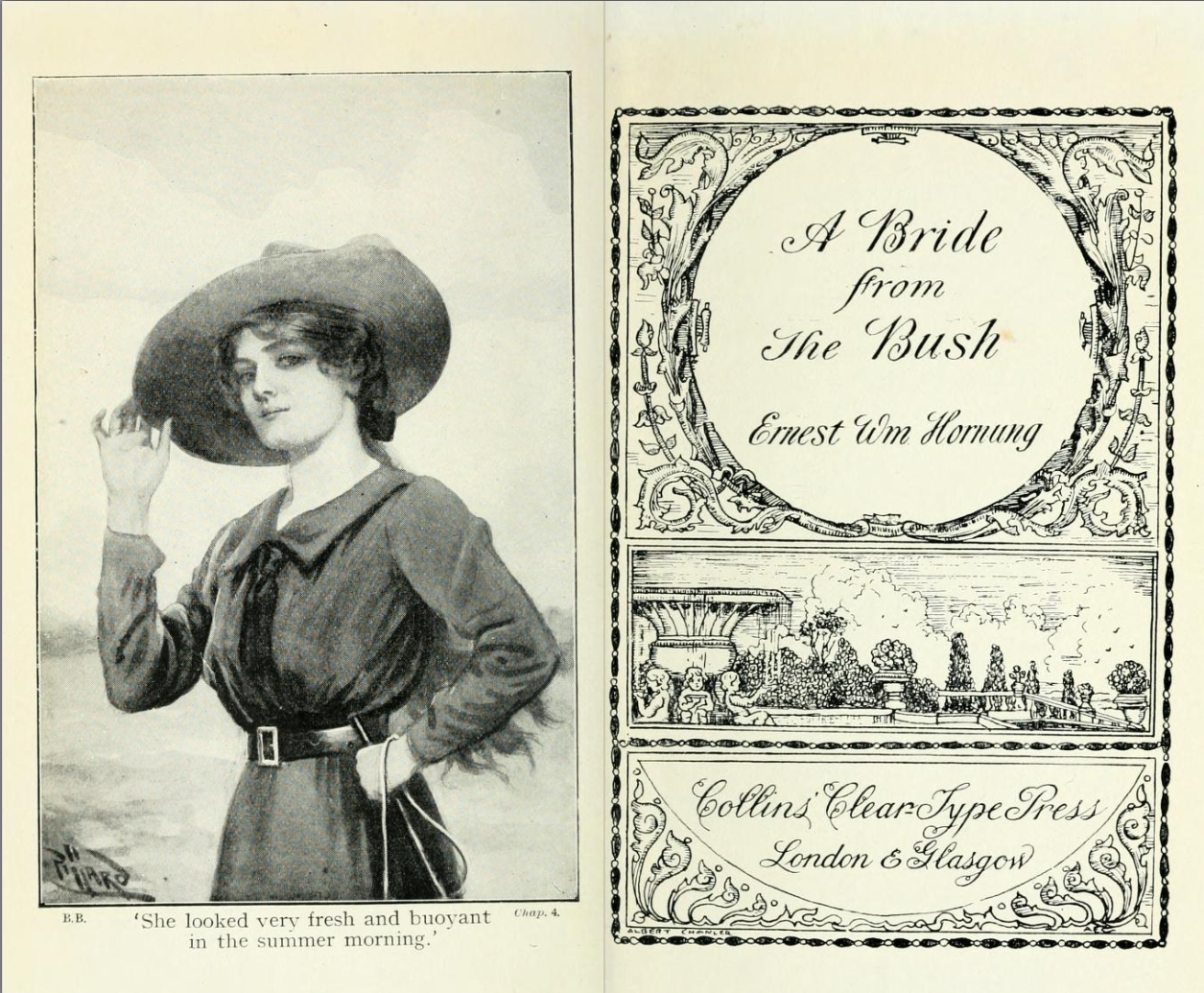
- Title page
- Author: E. W. Hornung
- Language: English
- Series: Ivory Series
- Subject: Australia–United Kingdom relations
- Published: 1890 (Smith, Elder & Co.)
- Publication place: United Kingdom

A Bride from the Bush is the first novel written by E. W. Hornung. He started writing the book while working as a tutor for Charles Joseph Parsons in Mossgiel Station, New South Wales, Australia. The novel was initially published by Smith, Elder & Co. as a serial in the Cornhill Magazine, and then published in book format by the same company in October 1890. As with Tiny Luttrell and The Unbidden Guest, two of Hornung's other early novels, A Bride from the Bush points out flaws in British society by presenting the country through an Australian perspective. A reviewer from The New York Times called the novel "a most piquant contrast between civilization and crudity". The writer Thomas Alexander Browne called the titular character of A Bride from the Bush "a libel to Australian womankind". A Punch editor made the opposite claim, arguing that the protagonist of the novel is more kind-hearted and attractive than actual Australians.

Hornung's later stories in the A. J. Raffles series achieved much more popularity than A Bride from the Bush. Nonetheless, he himself liked A Bride from the Bush and his other Australian stories better than those of Raffles. When he published the novel Peccavi in 1900, a critic from The Advertiser wrote a scathing review, writing that Hornung should go back to Australia so he would be inspired to write something as good as A Bride from the Bush again. Upon Hornung's death, a tribute in The Freeman's Journal called A Bride from the Bush "the best and the best known" of Hornung's Australia-related stories. In 1924 André Cœuroy and Theodore Baker argued in The Musical Quarterly that Hornung's characterisation of the novel's hero as being pitiable for being unable to appreciate anthems demonstrates that A Bride from the Bush is typical of other novels of the time in favouring vocal church music.
