= The Amateur Cracksman =

1899 short story collection by E. W. Hornung

- Author: E. W. Hornung
- Language: English
- Series: A. J. Raffles
- Genre: Crime fiction
- Publisher: Methuen & Co. (UK); Scribner's (US)
- Publication date: 1899
- Publication place: United Kingdom
- Followed by: The Black Mask

The Amateur Cracksman is an 1899 short story collection by E. W. Hornung. It was published in the UK by Methuen & Co., London, and in the US by Scribner's, New York. Many later editions (T. Nelson & Sons, 1914; University of Nebraska Press, 1976; et al.) expand the title to Raffles: The Amateur Cracksman. Some editions such as Penguin Books, 1948, retitle the collection simply, Raffles.

It was the original short story collection by Hornung, featuring his most famous character, A. J. Raffles, a gentleman thief in late Victorian Great Britain. The book was very well received and spawned three follow-ups: two more short story collections, The Black Mask (1901) and A Thief in the Night (1904), as well as a full-length novel, Mr. Justice Raffles (1909).

== Overview ==
A national sporting hero, Arthur J. Raffles (Note: While Raffles's initials are given in this story collection, his first name is not stated. It is revealed in stories collected in The Black Mask (1901).) is a prominent member of London society. As a cricketer, he regularly represents England in Test matches. He uses this as cover to commit a number of burglaries, primarily stealing valuable jewelry from the elite of London, for thrill and profit. He is assisted in this by his friend, the younger Harry "Bunny" Manders (Note: Bunny's real first name is not given in this story collection, and is only mentioned in the last short story in A Thief in the Night (1905).), who idealizes Raffles as a sportsman. Both men are constantly under the surveillance of Inspector Mackenzie of Scotland Yard, who is always thwarted in his attempts to pin the crimes on Raffles.

== Contents ==
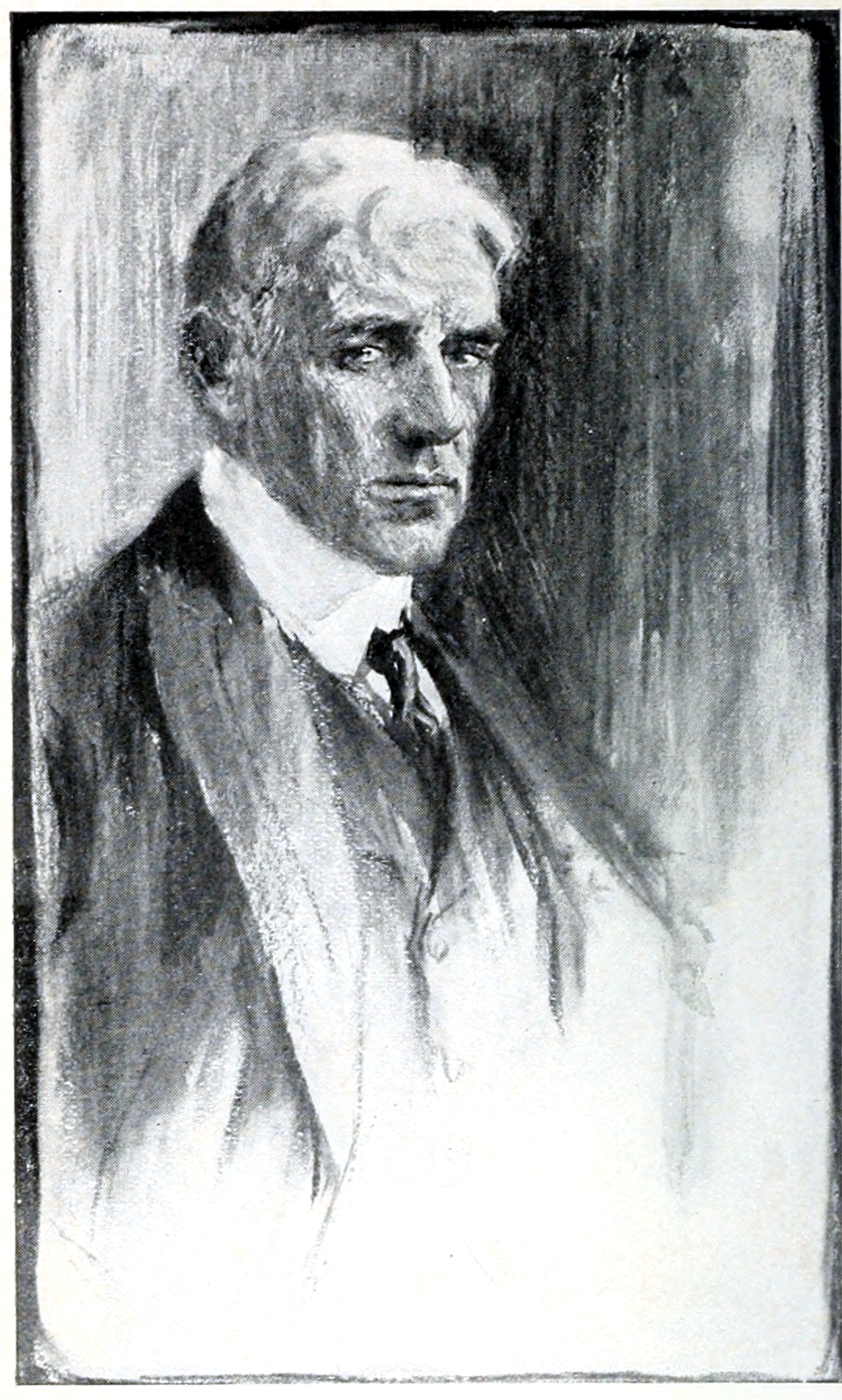
Raffles, 1905 frontispiece by F. C. Yohn

1. "The Ides of March" – Raffles initiates Bunny into his profession, taking him along as an accomplice.
2. "A Costume Piece" – Raffles schemes to steal diamonds from the millionaire Reuben Rosenthall.
3. "Gentlemen and Players" – While in the countryside to play a cricket match, Raffles and Bunny are surprised to discover Inspector Mackenzie of Scotland Yard there, attempting to thwart an expected burglary.
4. "Le Premier Pas" – Raffles recounts his first felony, committed in Australia.
5. "Wilful Murder" – Becoming aware that a dealer has discovered his real identity, Raffles proceeds to his house with the intention of murdering him.
6. "Nine Points of the Law" – Raffles and Bunny are tasked by a lawyer to extricate a rare picture, bound for Australia.
7. "The Return Match" – Raffles expects a visit from a recently escaped convict.
8. "The Gift of the Emperor" – Raffles and Bunny board a vessel carrying a famous pearl as a diplomatic gift.
