= Belgravia (magazine) =

British monthly literary magazine

Belgravia was a monthly London illustrated literary magazine of the late 19th century that was founded by Mary Elizabeth Braddon.

== History ==
Established in 1866, Belgravia featured serialized novels, poems, travel narratives, and biographies, as well as essays on fashion, history, and science. Under the editorship of Braddon (1866–1876), the magazine was best known for publishing sensation fiction.

In 1876, Chatto & Windus purchased the magazine and Andrew Chatto replaced Braddon as editor. Under Chatto, Belgravia moved away from sensation fiction and began publishing works by such authors as Charles Reade, Mark Twain, Wilkie Collins, Arthur Conan Doyle, and Thomas Hardy.

Belgravia's circulation peaked at 18,000 in 1868, and was at 15,000 when it was sold to Chatto & Windus. As it dropped its focus on sensation literature, sales of the magazine plummeted, and by 1877 its circulation was down to 3,000.

The magazine was issued monthly, and often an "annual" issue would be issued near the end of the year. The magazine published a total of 406 issues, with the first edition being published in November 1866 and the last edition being published in June 1899.

== Complete titles ==
The complete title of the magazine varied slightly over the years:

- Belgravia: A London Magazine (1866–1876)
- Belgravia: An Illustrated London Magazine (1876–1888)
- Belgravia: A London Magazine (1888–1899)
