= Gentlemen and Players (short story) =

- Short story by E. W. Hornung
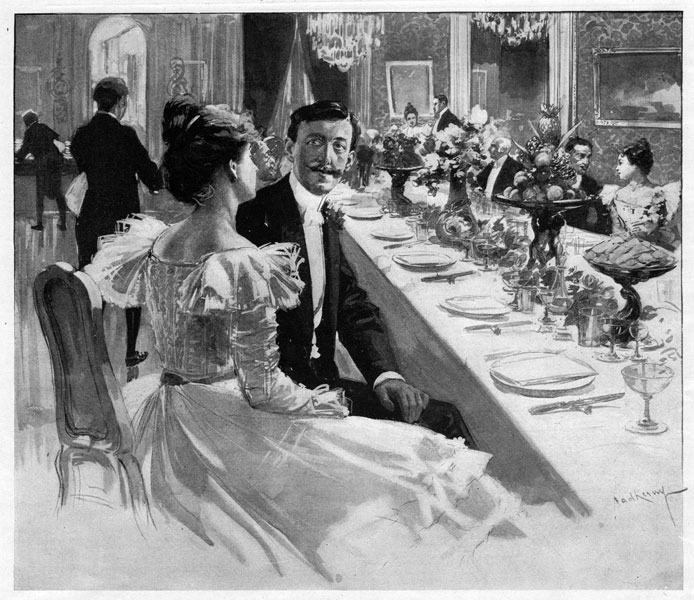
- 1898 Collier's illustration by E. V. Nadherny
- Country: United Kingdom
- Language: English
- Genre(s): Crime fiction

Publication
- Publisher: Cassell & Co
- Media type: Print (Magazine)
- Publication date: August 1898

Chronology
- Series: A. J. Raffles
| A Costume Piece | Le Premier Pas |

"Gentlemen and Players" is a short story by E. W. Hornung, and features the gentleman thief A. J. Raffles, and his companion and biographer, Bunny Manders. The story was first published in August 1898 by Cassell's Magazine. The story was also included in the collection The Amateur Cracksman, published by Methuen & Co. Ltd in London, and Charles Scribner's Sons in New York, both in 1899.

== Plot ==
While Raffles is out during a Gentlemen v Players cricket match at Lord's, a young cricketer named Crowley approaches Raffles. Raffles learns that Crowley's father, Lord Amersteth, is looking for cricketers, such as Raffles, to play on Crowley's team in games celebrating Crowley's twenty-first birthday at his father's estate, Milchester Abbey, in Dorset. Raffles persuades Lord Amersteth to also invite Bunny to play. Bunny, who secretly cannot play cricket, is horrified, but accepts. Raffles returns to the field to bowl, and plays excellently. Afterwards, Raffles reveals that he intends to steal while at Lord Amersteth's.

A month later, Raffles helps Bunny practice cricket. Before they arrive, they briefly take shelter from rain at an inn. However, Raffles immediately leaves the inn at the sight of someone Bunny doesn't recognize.

At Milchester, Bunny is overwhelmed by the prestige of the party, while Raffles mingles easily. At dinner, the rector's talkative daughter confides in Bunny that a Scotland Yard detective is on the lookout for two well-known thieves in the area. Bunny, horrified, thinks that the man at the inn must be the detective. The rector's daughter points out the five thousand pound necklace that one guest, Lady Melrose, is wearing. Bunny is unable to voice his concerns to Raffles for two hours. Meanwhile, Bunny also endures the conversation of a Scottish photographer named Clephane.

"That would be something like a match. Gentlemen and Players at single wicket, by Jove!"

— Raffles, on matching wits with the other thief

Afterwards, Bunny goes to inform Raffles about the detective; however, he discovers Raffles has already been informed by Crowley. Moreover, the detective is actually Clephane, really a disguised Inspector Mackenzie. The man at the inn is a famous thief, and the leader of the gang Mackenzie is after. Raffles is excited by the situation, but Bunny makes Raffles promise not to take any risks.

The week continues normally. Bunny enjoys himself. On the cricket field, a lucky catch early on assures him his pride, despite his mediocre gameplay.

In the very early morning of the final day, Bunny is woken by a fight outside his room. He finds Inspector Mackenzie struggling with one of the waiters. Bunny holds the waiter, and Mackenzie runs downstairs to find the man's accomplices. Crowley and Lord Amersteth appear, followed by Lady Melrose's French maid. She says that Lady Melrose's window is open, and the lady's necklace box is gone. The other cricketers, including Raffles, arrive; Crowley leads them to follow Mackenzie. Bunny and Lord Amersteth drag the waiter downstairs, and give him to two other servants. Then they hear gunshots, and run outside.

They all come upon a wounded Mackenzie. Lord Amersteth reveals to everyone Mackenzie's true identity, and they carry Mackenzie inside. The criminals have escaped with the necklace. After some time, the final game of cricket is cancelled, and most of the cricketers, including Raffles and Bunny, leave by train.

When alone in a hansom, Bunny tells Raffles that he is glad to have been on the side of justice. Raffles, amused, praises the thieves' trick of lowering the jewellery box out of Lady Melrose's window. In fact, Raffles had seen the thieves through his window, and had run to warn the lady, but he could not wake her. Raffles shows Bunny a brief glimpse of Lady Melrose's stolen necklace, removed from its case.

== Adaptations ==
=== Television ===
The story was adapted into the pilot episode of the Raffles television series, with Anthony Valentine as A. J. Raffles and Christopher Strauli as Bunny Manders. The episode, titled "The Amateur Cracksman", first aired on 10 September 1975.

=== Radio ===
BBC Radio adapted the story into the second episode of its Raffles radio series, "Gentlemen and Players", which first aired on 27 October 1985. The drama features Jeremy Clyde as Raffles and Michael Cochrane as Bunny. The episode closely follows the plot of the original story, with some minor changes:

- In the drama, Raffles and Bunny are watching Crowley play in the Eton and Harrow Match. The original story begins during a game of Gentlemen v Players; Crowley is mentioned to have been in Harrow's cricket team last year.
- In the drama, Raffles pretends to Lord Amersteth that Bunny wasn't in their school's cricket team solely because he had to leave the school early. In the original, Raffles only claims Bunny just barely didn't make the team.
- In the drama, Raffles catches sight of the famous thief while on the train, not at an inn. While on the train, an attendant on the train praises Raffles for a game he played in Somerset. Raffles tips the attendant generously.
- In the drama, it is Clephane, not the rector's daughter, who draws Bunny's attention to Lady Melrose's necklace.
- The famous thief is not named or captured in the original story; his name is only revealed in a later short story to be Crawshay. In the episode, he is both named and captured.
- In the drama, Bunny loses a night of sleep after the first day over fear of the cricket games, and of Crawshay. In the original story, Bunny goes to sleep with a light heart.
- The drama names the guilty waiter as Smithson. Lord Amersteth locks the man in a cupboard in the episode, instead of passing him off to other servants.

"Gentlemen and Players" was adapted as the fifth episode of Raffles, the Gentleman Thief, a series on the American radio show Imagination Theatre. The episode first aired in 2005.
