= Victor E. Neuburg =

British historian (1924–1996)

Victor Edward Neuburg (8 March 1924 – January 1996) was a scholar.

Neuburg was born in Steyning, Sussex, the son of Victor Benjamin Neuburg and his wife Kathleen Rose Goddard.

He was educated at the University of Leicester where he received the degree of Master of Education in 1967.

He was Lecturer (later Senior Lecturer) in the School of Librarianship North-Western Polytechnic/Polytechnic of North London. He was general editor of the Woburn Press series of reprints The Social History of Education.

In the year 1984/5 he was Samuel Foster Haven Fellow of the American Antiquarian Society. His Fellowship publication was 'Chapbooks in America', in Cathy N. Davidson, ed., Reading in America (Baltimore: Johns Hopkins University Press, 1989)

Neuburg married Hannah 'Anne' Hilsum (1919–2000) in 1944. They had a daughter, Caroline Neuburg, in 1948, who in turn married Brian Robertson in 1973, with whom she had daughters Katherine and Alison.

== Publications ==
- John Buchan, A history of the First World War, abridged and introduced by Victor Neuberg (Moffat: Lochar, 1991)
- Victor Neuburg, Gone for a soldier: a history of life in the British ranks since 1660 (London: Cassell, 1989)
- Victor E. Neuburg, 'Chapbooks in America', in Cathy N. Davidson, ed., Reading in America (Baltimore: Johns Hopkins University Press, 1989)
- Victor Neuburg, A guide to the Western Front: a companion for travellers (Harmondsworth: Penguin, 1988)
- Charles Dickens, A December vision: his social journalism, edited by Neil Philip and Victor Neuburg (London: Collins, 1986)
- Henry Mayhew, London labour and the London poor, selections made and introduced by Victor Neuburg (Penguin classics, 3241; Harmondsworth: Penguin Books, 1985)
- Victor E. Neuburg, The Popular Press companion to popular literature (Bowling Green, Ohio: Bowling Green State University Popular Press, 1983
- Vickybird: a memoir of Victor B. Neuburg, by his son Victor E. Neuburg (London: Polytechnic of North London, 1983)
- Victor E. Neuburg, The Batsford companion to popular literature (London: Batsford Academic and Educational, 1982)
- Victor E. Neuburg, History hunter, illustrated by Trevor Ridley (London: Beaver Books, 1979)
- Thomas Frognall Dibdin: selections, compiled and introduced by Victor E. Neuburg (Great bibliographers series, no. 3; Metuchen, N.J.: Scarecrow Press, 1978)
- Victor E. Neuburg, Popular literature: a history and guide, from the beginning of printing to the year 1897 (London: Woburn, 1977; Harmondsworth: Penguin Books, 1977)
- Victor E. Neuburg, Chapbooks: a guide to reference material on English, Scottish and American chapbook literature of the eighteenth and nineteenth centuries (2nd edn., London: Woburn Press, 1972)
- Victor E. Neuburg, The past we see today (London: Oxford University Press, 1972)
- Literacy and society, edited with a new introduction by Victor E. Neuburg (The social history of education, second series, no. 5; London: Woburn Press, 1971)
- Victor E. Neuburg, Popular education in eighteenth century England (London: Woburn Press, 1971)
- Edwin Pearson, Banbury chap books and nursery toy book literature of the eighteenth and nineteenth centuries, new foreword by Victor Neuburg (Welwyn Garden City: Seven Dials Press, 1970)
- Victor E. Neuburg, 'Popular Education and Literacy', Local Population Stuies Magazine and Newsletter, no. 4 (Spring 1970), pp. 51-5
- Victor E. Neuburg, 'Literacy in eighteenth century England: a caveat', Local Population Stuies Magazine and Newsletter, no. 2 (Spring 1969), pp. 44-6
- Victor E. Neuburg, The penny histories: a study of chapbooks for young readers over two centuries, illustrated with facsimiles of seven chapbooks (The Juvenile Library; London: Oxford University Press, 1968)
- Victor E. Neuburg, Points & pitfalls: a first notebook in French composition (n.p.: University Tutorial Press, 1965)
- Victor E. Neuburg, Points and pitfalls: a first notebook in German composition (n.p.: University Tutorial Press, 1965)
- Victor E. Neuburg, Chapbooks: a bibliography of references to English and American chapbook literature of the eighteenth and nineteenth centuries (London: Vine Press, 1964)
- Victor E. Neuburg, A select handlist of references to chapbook literature of the eighteenth and nineteenth centuries (Edinburgh: privately printed by J. A. Birkbeck, 1952)
