= E. W. Hornung =

British writer (1866–1921)

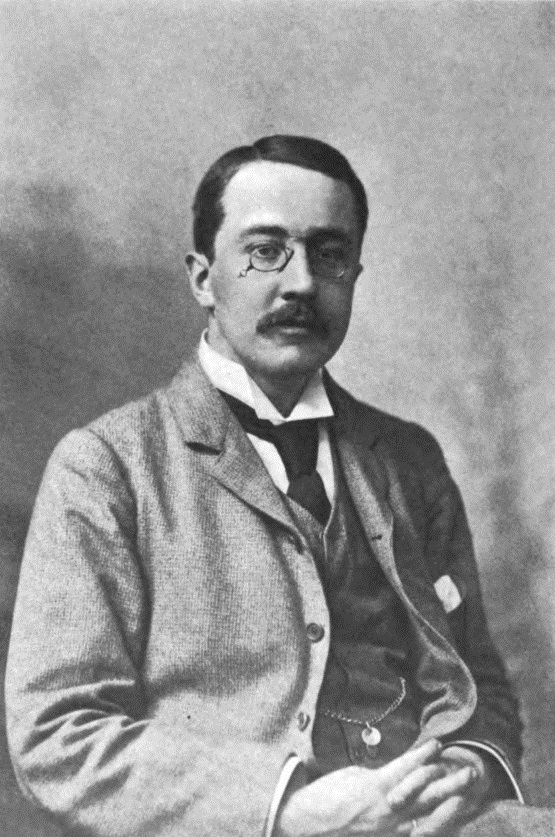
E. W. Hornung

Ernest William Hornung (7 June 1866 – 22 March 1921) was an English author and poet known for writing the A. J. Raffles series of stories about a gentleman thief in late 19th-century London. Hornung was educated at Uppingham School; as a result of poor health he left the school in December 1883 to travel to Sydney, where he stayed for two years. He drew on his Australian experiences as a background when he began writing, initially short stories and later novels.

In 1898 he wrote "In the Chains of Crime", which introduced Raffles and his sidekick, Bunny Manders; the characters were based partly on his friends Oscar Wilde and Wilde's lover, Lord Alfred Douglas, and also on the characters of Sherlock Holmes and Dr. Watson, created by his brother-in-law, Arthur Conan Doyle. The series of Raffles short stories were collected for sale in book form in 1899, and two further books of Raffles short stories followed, as well as a poorly received novel. Aside from his Raffles stories, Hornung was a prodigious writer of fiction, publishing numerous books from 1890, with A Bride from the Bush to his 1914 novel The Crime Doctor.

The First World War brought an end to Hornung's fictional output. His son, Oscar, was killed at the Second Battle of Ypres in July 1915. Hornung joined the YMCA, initially in England, then in France, where he helped run a canteen and library. He published two collections of poetry during the war, and then, afterwards, one further volume of verse and an account of his time spent in France, Notes of a Camp-Follower on the Western Front. Hornung's fragile constitution was further weakened by the stress of his war work. To aid his recuperation, he and his wife visited the south of France in 1921. He fell ill from influenza on the journey, and died on 22 March 1921, aged 54.

Although much of Hornung's work has fallen into obscurity, his Raffles stories continued to be popular, and have formed numerous film and television adaptations. Hornung's stories dealt with a wider range of themes than crime: he examined scientific and medical developments, guilt, class and the unequal role played by women in society. Two threads that run through a sizeable proportion of his books are Australia and cricket; the latter was also a lifelong passion.

== Biography ==
=== Early life: 1866–1886 ===
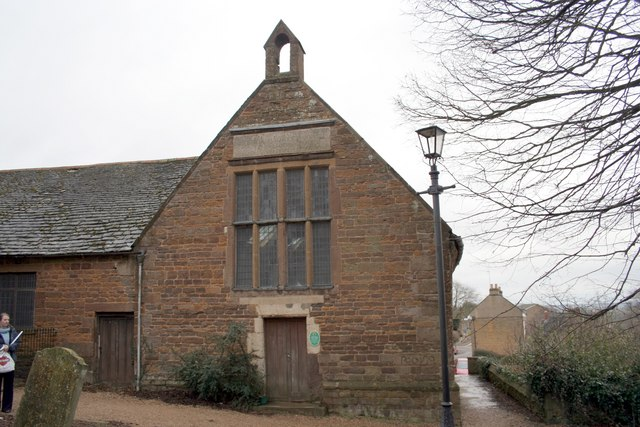
The Old School of Uppingham School, Rutland, where Hornung developed his love of cricket

Hornung was born Ernest William Hornung on 7 June 1866 at Cleveland Villas, Middlesbrough; he was nicknamed Willie from an early age. He was the third son, and youngest of eight children, of John Peter Hornung and his wife Harriet née Armstrong. John was christened Johan Petrus Hornung in the Transylvania region of Hungary and, after working in Hamburg for a shipping firm, had moved to Britain in the 1840s as a coal and iron merchant. (Note: John Hornung had also acted as Stockton's Swedish, Danish and Norwegian vice-consul.) John married Harriet in March 1848, by which time he had anglicised his name. At the age of 13 Hornung joined St Ninian's Preparatory School in Moffat, Dumfriesshire, before enrolling at Uppingham School in 1880. (Note: Hornung's time at Uppingham was during some of the later years of its headmaster Edward Thring; Hornung was an admirer of his Thring, and called him "one of the great headmasters of the nineteenth century".) Hornung was well liked at school, and developed a lifelong love of cricket despite limited skills at the game, which were further worsened by bad eyesight, asthma and, according to his biographer Peter Rowland, a permanent state of generally poor health.

When Hornung was 17 his health worsened; he left Uppingham and travelled to Australia, where it was hoped by his family that the climate would be beneficial. On his arrival he was employed as a tutor to the Parsons family in Mossgiel in the Riverina, south-western New South Wales. In addition to teaching, he spent time working in remote sheep stations in the outback and contributing material to the weekly magazine The Bulletin; he also began writing what was to become his first novel. Although he spent only two years in Australia, the experience was "the making of him and ... the making of his career as a writer", according to Rowland. Another biographer, Mark Valentine, wrote that Hornung "seems to have regarded this period as one of the most satisfying of his life".

=== Return to England: 1886–1898 ===
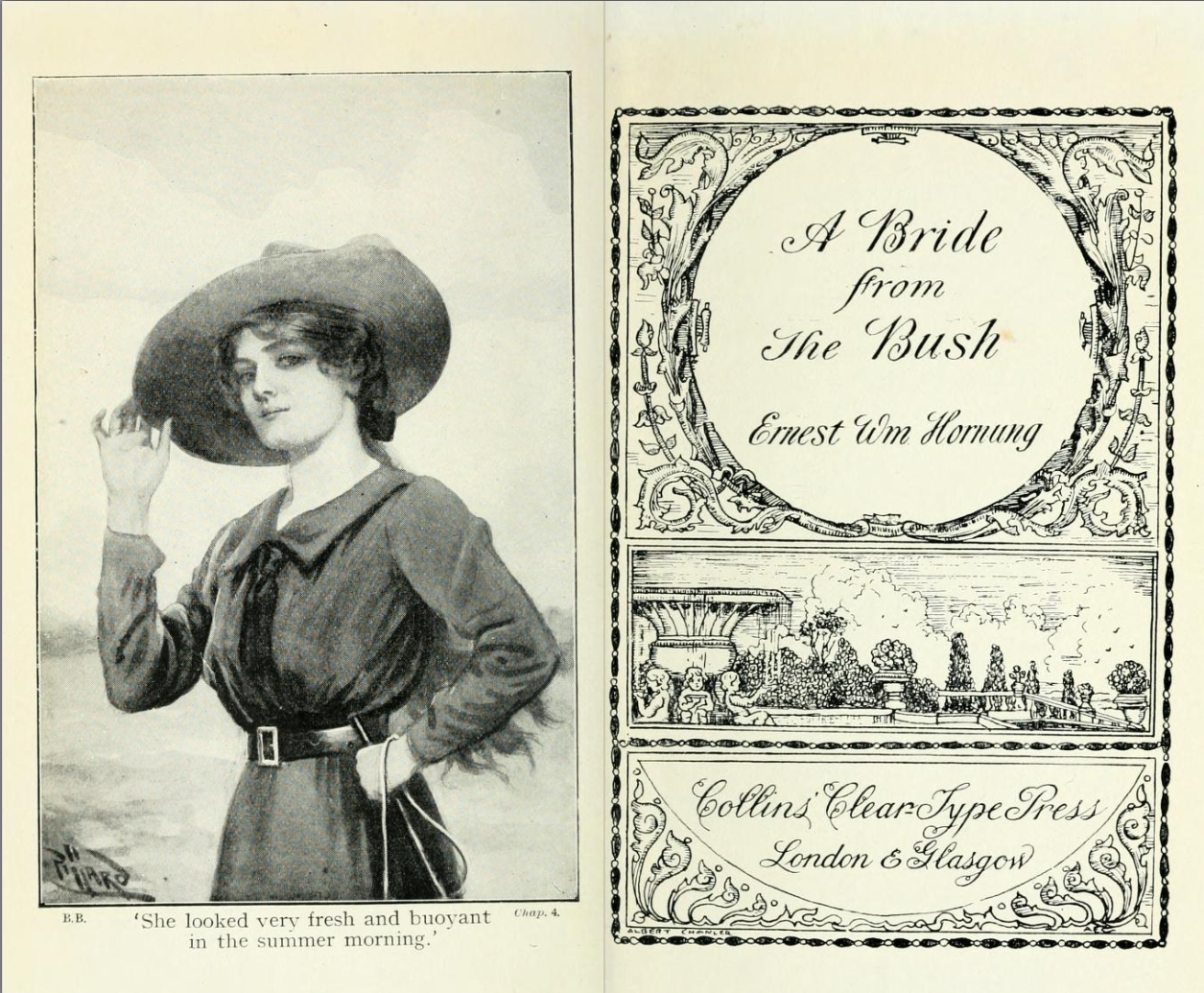
A Bride from the Bush, Hornung's first novel, a "graceful comedy of manners"

Hornung returned to England in February 1886, before the death of his father in November. From a position of relative prosperity, John's coal and iron business had encountered difficulties and he was in financially straitened circumstances by the time of his death. Hornung found work in London as a journalist and story writer, often publishing his work under a pseudonym, although in 1887 he published his first story under his own name, "Stroke of Five", which appeared in Belgravia magazine. His work as a journalist was during the period of Jack the Ripper and the series of five murders, which were undertaken against a background of rising urban crime in London; it was around this time that Hornung developed an interest in criminal behaviour.

Hornung had worked on the novel manuscript he brought back from Australia and between July and November 1890 the story, "A Bride from the Bush", was published in five parts in The Cornhill Magazine. It was also released that year as a book—his first. The story—described by Rowland as an "assured, graceful comedy of manners"—used Hornung's knowledge of Australia as a backdrop, and the device of an Australian bride to examine British social behaviour; the novel was well received by critics. In 1891 Hornung became a member of two cricket clubs: the Idlers, whose members included Arthur Conan Doyle, Robert Barr and Jerome K. Jerome, and the Strand club.

Hornung knew Doyle's sister, Constance ("Connie") Aimée Monica Doyle, whom he had met when he visited Portugal. (Note: Details—including dates—for Hornung's activities are scant; his biographer, Alison Cox, complains that "contemporary references to Hornung are few". When Rowland wrote Hornung's biography in 1999 he called the author "a true Man of Mystery", so limited were the sources; he points out that the Dictionary of National Biography did not include an entry for Hornung until 1993, when he was included in a supplementary edition, Missing Persons.) Connie was described by Doyle's biographer, Andrew Lycett, as being attractive, "with pre-Raphaelite looks ... the most sought-after of the Doyle daughters". By December 1892, when Hornung, Doyle and Jerome visited the Black Museum at Scotland Yard, Hornung and Connie were engaged, and in 1893 Hornung dedicated his second novel, Tiny Luttrell, "to C.A.M.D." They were married on 27 September 1893, although Doyle was not at the wedding and relations between the two writers were sometimes strained. The Hornungs had a son, Arthur Oscar, in 1895; while his first name was from Doyle, who was also Arthur's godfather, the boy's middle name was probably after Doyle and Hornung's mutual friend Oscar Wilde and it was by his second name that he was known. (Note: Rowland observes that although there is no proof the name was from Wilde, "the circumstantial evidence for most of these suppositions is so startlingly strong that it is impossible ... to disregard it".) In 1894 Doyle and Hornung began work on a play for Henry Irving, on the subject of boxing during the Regency; Doyle was initially eager and paid Hornung £50 as a down payment before he withdrew after the first act had been written: the work was never completed.

Like Hornung's first novel, Tiny Luttrell had Australia as a backdrop and also used the plot device of an Australian woman in a culturally alien environment. (Note: Hornung's biographer Stephen Knight described the plots of both novels as "Australian women travel to England and their direct vigour soon exposes the hypocrisy of British society".) The Australian theme was present in his next four novels: The Boss of Taroomba (1894), The Unbidden Guest (1894), Irralie's Bushranger (1896) and The Rogue's March (1896). In the last of these Hornung wrote of the Australian convict transport system, and showed evidence of a "growing fascination with the motivation behind criminal behaviour and a deliberate sympathy for the criminal hero as a victim of events", while Irralie's Bushranger introduced the character Stingaree, an Oxford-educated, Australian gentleman thief, in a novel that "casts doubt on conventional responses" to a positive criminal character, according to Hornung's biographer, Stephen Knight.

=== Introducing Raffles: 1898–1914 ===
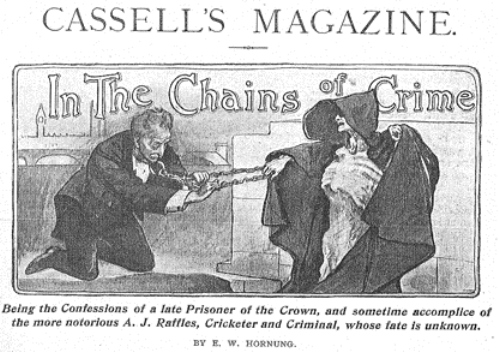
The first Raffles story was in the June 1898 issue of Cassell's Magazine.

In 1898 Hornung's mother died, aged 72 and he dedicated his next book, a series of short stories titled Some Persons Unknown, to her memory. Later that year Hornung and his wife visited Italy for six months, staying in Posillipo; his account of the location appeared in an article of the May 1899 edition of The Cornhill Magazine. (Note: Posillipo was also where Oscar Wilde and his partner, Lord Alfred Douglas, had lived together in 1897.) The Hornungs returned to London in early 1899, to a house in Pitt Street, Kensington, where they lived for the next six years.

The fictional character Stingaree proved to be a prototype of a character Hornung used in a series of six short stories published in 1898 in Cassell's Magazine, A. J. Raffles. The character was modelled on George Cecil Ives, a Cambridge-educated criminologist and talented cricketer who, like Raffles, was a resident of the Albany, a gentlemen's only residence in Mayfair. The first tale of the series "In the Chains of Crime" was published in June that year, titled "The Ides of March". The stories were collected into one volume—with two additional tales—under the name The Amateur Cracksman, which was published the following year. (Note: The eight stories that make up The Amateur Cracksman are "The Ides of March", "A Costume Piece", "Gentlemen and Players", "Le Premier Pas", "Wilful Murder", "Nine Points of the Law", "The Return Match" and "The Gift of the Emperor".) Hornung used a narrative form similar to Doyle's Sherlock Holmes stories, with Raffles and his partner-in-crime (and former school fag) Bunny Manders being the criminal counterparts to Holmes and Dr. Watson—although Rowland writes that Raffles and Manders "were also fictionalized versions of Wilde and Bosie" (Wilde's lover, Lord Alfred Douglas).—and he dedicated the stories to his brother-in-law: "To A.C.D. This form of flattery". (Note: Doyle was not particularly flattered by the dedication and it disappeared from future editions.) Doyle had warned against writing the stories, and reflected in his memoirs that "there are few finer examples of short-story writing in our language than these, though I confess I think they are rather dangerous in their suggestion. I told him so before he put pen to paper, and the result has, I fear, borne me out. You must not make the criminal the hero". The book was a popular and financial success, although some critics also echoed Doyle's fears. The reviewer in The Spectator wrote that "stern moralists" would consider the book's premise "as a new, ingenious, artistic, but most reprehensible application of the crude principles involved in the old-fashioned hero-worship of Jack Sheppard and Dick Turpin". The book ends with Manders imprisoned and Raffles apparently dead, something that left The Spectator reviewer "expressing [their] satisfaction that this audaciously entertaining volume is not issued in a cheap form. It is emphatically a feat of virtuosity rather than a tribute to virtue."

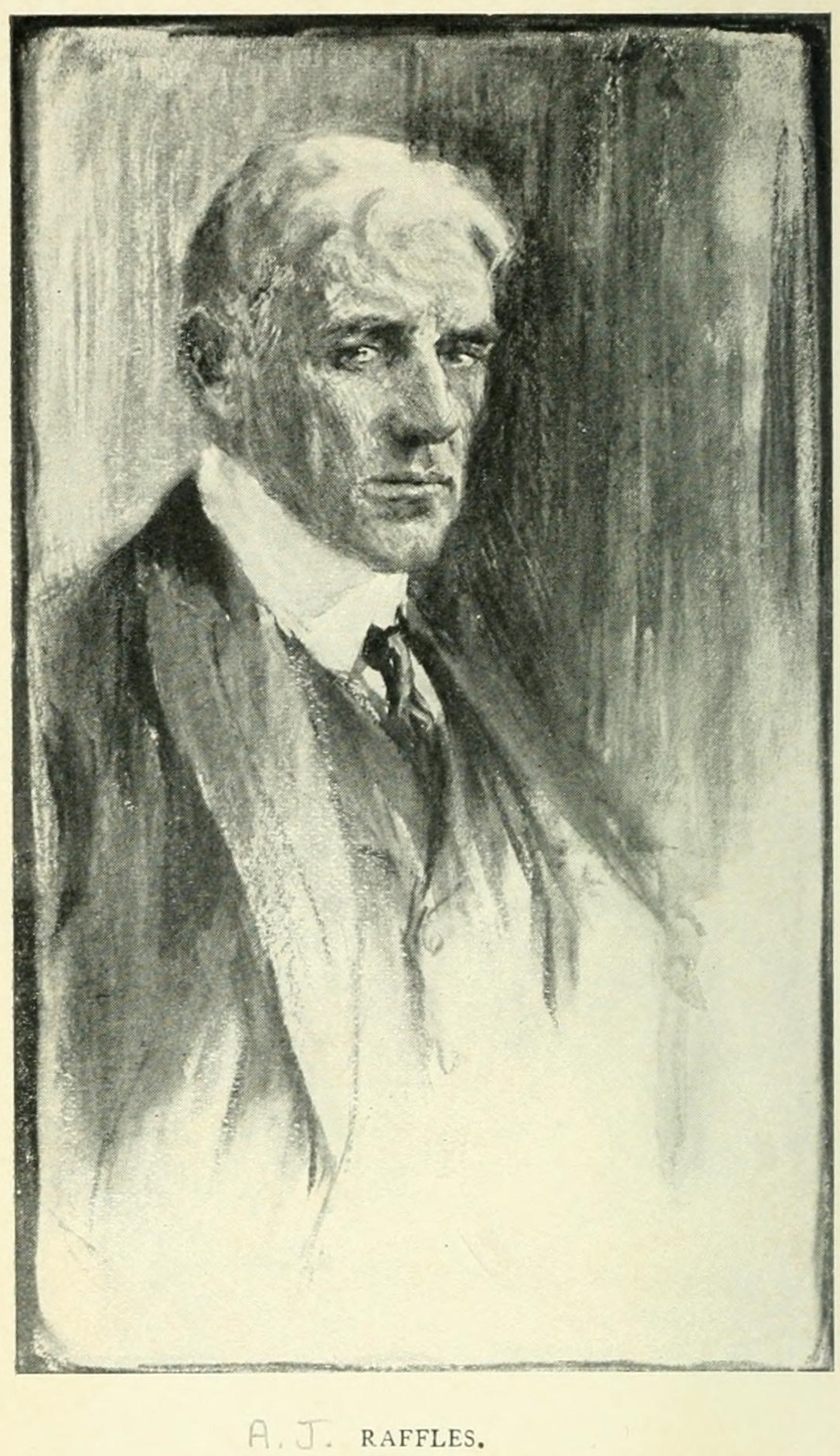
A. J. Raffles, introduced in 1898

After publishing two novels, Dead Men Tell No Tales in 1899 and Peccavi in 1900, (Note: Peccavi concerns a clergyman who has sinned earlier in life: the title is Latin for "I have sinned".) Hornung published a second collection of Raffles stories, The Black Mask, in 1901. (Note: The Black Mask was later republished as Raffles: Further Adventures of the Amateur Cracksman.) The nearly broke Manders is told to apply for the post of a nurse to an elderly invalid, who then reveals himself to be Raffles, who, as Manders describes, had "aged twenty years; he looked fifty at the very least. His hair was white; there was no trick about that; and his face was another white. The lines about the corners of the eyes and mouth were both many and deep". In the final story of the collection, "The Knees of the Gods", Raffles and Manders enlist in the army to fight in the Second Boer War; the story closes with Manders wounded and Raffles killed. The critics again complained about the criminal aspect; The Spectator declared "this sort of book presents crime in a form too entertaining and attractive to be moral", while the reviewer for The Illustrated London News thought that Hornung's "invention has obviously flagged ... It is laughable, in a sense which the author never intended, to hear these burglars rant about the honour of Old England. It is a pity that the man who wrote Peccavi should stoop to this".

In 1903 Hornung collaborated with Eugène Presbrey to write a four-act play, Raffles, The Amateur Cracksman, which was based on two previously published short stories, "Gentlemen and Players" and "The Return Match". (Note: Rowland questions how much Hornung contributed to the project, and "suspects that ... his contribution to the venture was minimal".) The play was first performed at the Princess Theatre, New York, on 27 October 1903 with Kyrle Bellew as Raffles, and ran for 168 performances. (Note: The play transferred to London in May 1906 with Gerald du Maurier in the lead.)

In 1905, after publishing four other books in the interim, (Note: At Large (1902), The Shadow of the Rope (1902), Denis Dent: A Novel (1903) and No Hero (1903).) Hornung brought back the character Stingaree, previously seen in Irralie's Bushranger. (Note: In 1908 Hornung wrote a play, Stingaree, which was first performed in February 1908 at the Queen's Theatre, London.) Later that year he responded to public demand and produced a third series of short Raffles stories in A Thief in the Night, in which Manders relates some of his and Raffles's earlier adventures. The reviewer for the Boston Herald thought that "the sentimental side of the story has never before been shown so dramatically and romantically", and described the book as "thrilling and exciting". Hornung's next book was published in 1909 and was the final Raffles story, the full-length novel Mr. Justice Raffles; the book was poorly received, with the reviewer for The Observer asking if "Hornung is perhaps a little tired of Raffles", and stating that "it has not the magic or the 'go' of the first Raffles, and there is no good in pretending that it has". During the course of the year he collaborated with Charles Sansom to write a play A Visit From Raffles, which was performed in November that year at the Brixton Empress Theatre, London.

Hornung turned away from Raffles thereafter, and in February 1911 published The Camera Fiend, a thriller whose narrator is an asthmatic cricket enthusiast with an ironmaster father, much as Hornung was himself. The story concerned the attempts of a scientist to photograph the soul as it left the body. Hornung followed this up with Fathers of Men (1912) and The Thousandth Woman (1913) before Witching Hill (1913), a collection of eight short stories in which he introduced the characters Uvo Delavoye and the narrator Gillon, whom Rowland considers to be "reincarnations of Raffles and Bunny". Hornung's next work, The Crime Doctor (1914) marked the end of his fictional output.

=== First World War and aftermath ===
One of Hornung's two non-fiction works, Notes of a Camp Follower (1919)

Oscar Hornung left Eton College in 1914, intending to enter King's College, Cambridge, later that year. When Britain entered the war against Germany, he volunteered, and was commissioned into the Essex Regiment. He was killed at the Second Battle of Ypres on 6 July 1915, aged 20. Although heartbroken by the loss, Hornung was adamant that some good would come of it and he edited a privately issued collection of Oscar's letters home under the title Trusty and Well Beloved, released in 1916. Around this time he joined an anti-aircraft unit. In either 1916 or 1917 he joined the YMCA and did volunteer work in England for soldiers on leave; in March 1917 he visited France, writing a poem about his experience afterwards—something he had been doing more frequently since Oscar's death—and a collection of his war poetry, Ballad of Ensign Joy, was published later that year.

In July 1917 Hornung's poem, "Wooden Crosses", was published in The Times, (Note: A volume of poems titled Wooden Crosses was published in 1918.) and in September, "Bond and Free" appeared. Towards the end of the year, he was accepted as a volunteer in a YMCA canteen and library "a short distance behind the Front Line". During his service in Arras, in February 1918 he borrowed a staff car from a friend and visited his son's grave near Ypres, before returning to the library in Arras. Hornung was concerned about support for pacifism among troops, and wrote to his wife about it. When she spoke to Doyle about the matter, rather than discussing it with Hornung he informed the military authorities. Hornung was angered by Doyle's action, and "told him there was no need for him to 'butt in' except for his own 'satisfaction'." Relations between the two men were strained as a result. Hornung continued to work at the library until the German spring offensive in March overran the British positions and he was forced to retreat, firstly to Amiens and then, in April, back to England. He stayed in England until November 1918, when he again took up his YMCA duties, establishing a rest hut and library in Cologne. In 1919 Hornung's account of his time spent in France, Notes of a Camp-Follower on the Western Front, was published. Doyle later wrote of the book that "there are parts of it which are brilliant in their vivid portrayal", while Hornung's biographer, Alison Cox, described the book as "one of the best records of the war as experienced on the front lines". That year Hornung also published his third and final volume of poetry, The Young Guard.

=== Death and legacy ===
Hornung finished his work with the YMCA and returned to England probably in early 1919, according to Rowland. He worked on a new novel (Note: The manuscript of which did not survive.) but was hampered by poor health. His wife's health was of even greater concern, so in February 1921 they took a holiday in the south of France to recuperate. He fell ill on the train with a chill that turned into influenza and pneumonia from which he died on 22 March 1921, aged 54. He was buried in Saint-Jean-de-Luz, in the south of France, in a grave adjacent to that of George Gissing. Doyle, returning from a spiritualist lecture tour of Australia, received the news in Paris and travelled south in time for the funeral.

When Hornung had still been courting Doyle's sister, Doyle wrote that "I like young Willie Hornung very much ... he is one of the sweetest-natured and most delicate-minded men I ever knew". Honouring him after his death, Doyle wrote that he "was a Dr. [Samuel] Johnson without the learning but with a finer wit. No one could say a neater thing, and his writings, good as they are, never adequately represented the powers of the man, nor the quickness of his brain". His obituarist in The Times described him as "a man of large and generous nature, a delightful companion and conversationalist".

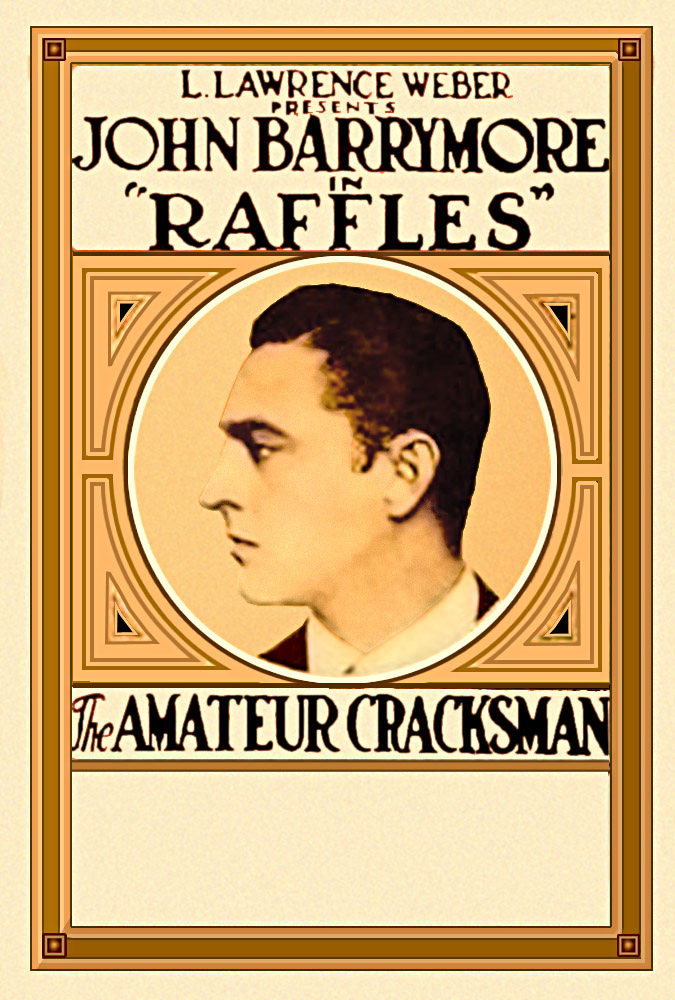
Poster for the 1917 film Raffles, the Amateur Cracksman, with John Barrymore

Much of Hornung's work fell out of favour as time passed; Rowland observed that "all of Hornung's other works have been forgotten, with the possible exception of Stingaree, but the cricketing Cracksman continues to enthral". The idea of a criminal as a positive character was one of Hornung's legacies, and Twentieth-Century Literary Criticism states that "critics have also interpreted Raffles as a prototype of the antihero in modern crime fiction". The academic Frank Wadleigh Chandler, describing Raffles's death, writes that "all his creator's attempts to portray him as a hero, rather than an anti-hero, deservedly fail." Valentine highlights one aspect of the stories was the mix of "devilry and daring" demonstrated by Raffles; in this respect he was a literary "forerunner of The Saint, James Bond and other insouciant types". The writer Colin Watson agrees, and called Hornung "a precursor of [Ian] Fleming".

The character continued in book form: the writer Philip Atkey, under the pseudonym Barry Perowne, obtained permission from the Hornung estate to continue the Raffles stories, and seven more novels followed between 1933 and 1940, with Raffles transformed from a gentleman thief to a tough adventurer. (Note: Perowne's books were: Raffles After Dark (1933); Raffles in Pursuit (1934); Raffles under Sentence (1936); She Married Raffles (1936); Raffles' Crime in Gibraltar (1937); Raffles vs. Sexton Blake (1937); The A.R.P. Mystery (1939); and Raffles and the Key Man (1940).) Perowne continued the series in 1950, and 14 of his stories were published in the 1974 volume Raffles Revisited. Hornung's original stories have undergone a number of reprints, and when all the short stories were published in a single volume, Graham Greene considered it "a splendid idea". In 1975 Greene had written a play based on the Raffles stories, The Return of A. J. Raffles, which premiered at the Royal Shakespeare Company, with Denholm Elliott as Raffles.

There were several Raffles films made during Hornung's lifetime, (Note: These included Raffles, the Amateur Cracksman (1905), with Kyrle Bellew resurrecting his theatrical role for the screen, and a second film released the same year with the same title, with J. Barney Sherry in the lead role. John Barrymore took the title role in the 1917 film Raffles, the Amateur Cracksman and in 1921, the year of Hornung's death, Gerald Ames took the role in Mr Justice Raffles.) Further films followed in the years after his death, including Raffles, the Amateur Cracksman (1925), with House Peters Sr.; Raffles (1930), featuring Ronald Colman; The Return of Raffles (1933), with George Barraud; and Raffles (1939), starring David Niven; the last of these was a Samuel Goldwyn Productions remake of their own 1930 film, which the academic Victor E. Neuburg called the "most memorable portrayal" of the character.

The BBC has dramatised some of Hornung's Raffles stories for radio, first in the 1940s and again from 1985 to 1993 in the radio series Raffles. Nigel Havers narrated some of the stories on BBC radio in 1995. In 1977 Anthony Valentine played the thief, and Christopher Strauli his partner, in a Yorkshire Television series. A 2001 television film, Gentleman Thief, adapted the stories for a contemporary audience, with Havers playing the lead.

== Writing ==
=== Style and technique ===
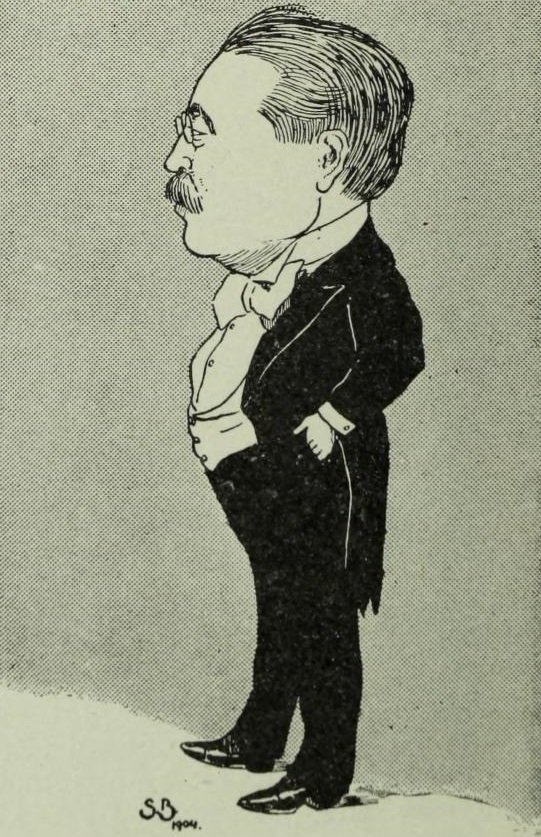
Caricature of Hornung, by Stuart Boyd, 1904

Hornung's prose is widely admired for its lucid, simple style. Oliver Edwards, writing in The Times, considered that "not the least attractive part of the Raffles books is the simple, plain, unaffected language in which each one of them is written". The obituarist in the same newspaper agrees, and thinks Hornung had "a power of good and clear description and a talent for mystery and surprise". Colin Watson also considers the point, and observes that in Hornung's writing, "superfluous description has been avoided and account of action is to the point", while Doyle admired his "sudden use of the right adjective and the right phrase", something the writer and journalist Jeremy Lewis sees as a "flamboyant, Kiplingesque taste for the vivid".

Critics have observed that Hornung's stories and novels are well-structured. George Orwell wrote that Hornung was "a very conscientious and on his level a very able writer. Anyone who cares for sheer efficiency must admire his work". Watson states that Hornung's "writing has pace. The stories, however ridiculous, carry the readers along briskly". According to Cox, "Hornung's work showed steady maturation" during his career, a point that Doyle also agreed with, although Edwards disagrees, and thinks The Crime Doctor to be one of Hornung's weaker books.

Hornung's approach to characters differed from other contemporary authors. Cox notes that Hornung "frequently chose to write from the perspective of the criminal", and while many of Hornung's novels contained criminal activity as a major element of the plot, the critic for Contemporary Authors states that the works do not "belong to the crime-fiction genre". Hornung's works included elements from more general fiction, "such as false identities, disguises, and disowned heiresses".

=== Major themes ===
The academic Nick Rance identifies three categories of Raffles stories: "the rise of the New Woman", in which Raffles either escapes from romantic entanglements, or uses the infatuations of a woman in order to achieve his aims; "the rise of the plutocracy", in which Raffles steals from the nouveau riche as much as the upper classes; (Note: By way of example, Rance identifies the characters of Reuben Rosenthall in "A Costume Piece", Angus Baird in "Wilful Murder" and Dan Levy in Mr Justice Raffles.) and those stories that seek "to reaffirm or re-establish a sense of middle-class identity". The last category is based on Raffles not being a member of "Society", only being accepted because of his cricketing ability and associated fame. From this point, Raffles's stealing from the rich is a "rearguard action on behalf of the puritan values" which was perceived as making up middle-class values, although Rance also states that those values are obscured because of the changing boundaries between the classes. Gariepy makes the same point, and considers that "Raffles's daring exploits and fantastic adventures symbolized the growing rebellion against Victorian sensibility at the turn of the century".

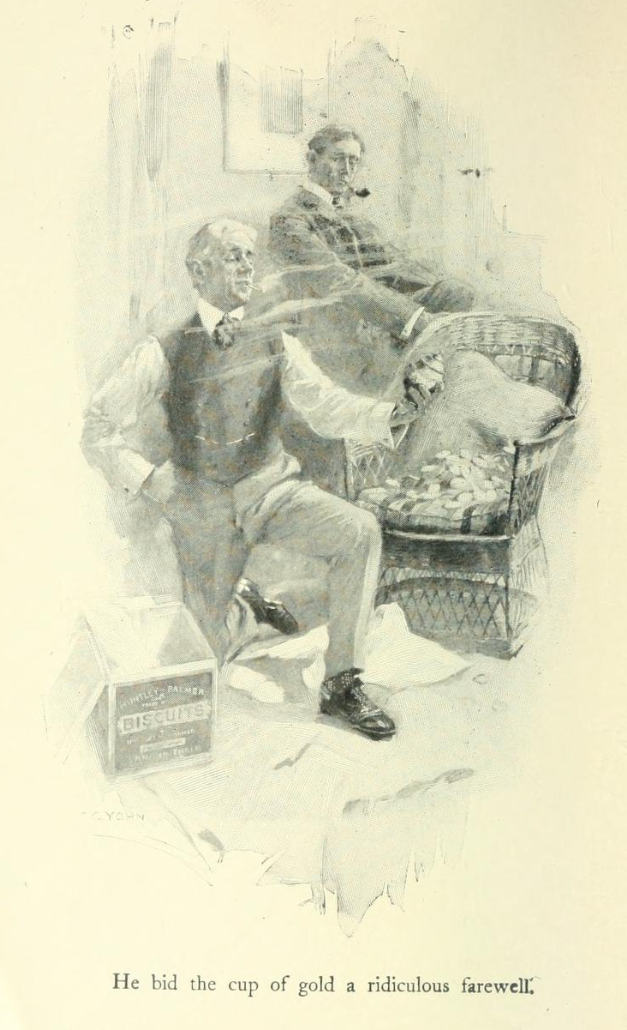
Raffles, in patriotic mood, sent a stolen gold cup to Queen Victoria, in celebration of her diamond jubilee.

Hornung kept abreast of scientific and medical developments, and was keen to incorporate them into his stories which, the critic for Contemporary Authors states, shows Hornung had "a streak of modernity and decided interest in new ideas". The Camera Fiend uses the modern technology of the camera as an instrument central to the plot, while the protagonist of The Crime Doctor uses psychology to identify criminals.

Throughout the Raffles stories patriotism runs as an intermittent theme—to such an extent that the writer William Vivian Butler describes him as a "super-patriot". In the course of the short story "A Jubilee Present" Raffles, celebrating Queen Victoria's diamond jubilee, steals a gold cup from the British Museum and sends it to the queen, telling Manders that "we have been ruled over for sixty years by infinitely the finest monarch in the world". In "The Knees of the Gods", Raffles volunteers for service in the Second Boer War, changing his name and hair colour—he jokes to Manders that he is prepared to "dye for his country"—and he later confesses his true identity to his superiors in order to unmask a spy.

Some of Hornung's novels, including The Shadow of the Rope, No Hero and The Thousandth Woman, are notable for "portraying women in a rather modern, favorable light", according to the critic for Contemporary Authors, showing concern for their unequal position in society. Cox identifies a theme of guilt running through a number of works. Among these is Peccavi, in which a clergyman lives his life trying to atone for an earlier crime; Shadow of the Rope, in which a woman is accused of her husband's murder; and The Thousandth Woman, in which a woman stands by her lover after he is accused of murder.

Although Hornung's Australian experience was brief, it influenced most of his literary work from A Bride from the Bush published in 1899, to Old Offenders and a Few Old Scores, which was published after his death. According to Chandler, "nearly two-thirds of [Hornung's] books refer in varying degrees to Australian incidents and experiences", with "even Raffles" starting his criminal career in Australia. Some of Horning's works—such as A Bride from the Bush—were praised for their accuracy of detail in depicting the Australian environment, although the detail could overwhelm the storyline, as in The Rogue's March.

Old Raffles may or may not have been an exceptional criminal, but as a cricketer I dare swear he was unique. Himself a dangerous bat, a brilliant field, and perhaps the very finest slow bowler of his decade.

— Manders on Raffles, The Amateur Cracksman, 1907

Cricket was one of Hornung's lifelong passions, and he was delighted to become a member of the Marylebone Cricket Club in 1907. From 1899 to 1907, he was the secretary of the Authors Cricket Club, organising the team's matches − a position which gave him a substantial degree of networking power in the literary world. The sport also permeated his stories, with Raffles playing for the Gentlemen of England. Rance observes that Raffles compares law-breaking and cricket: "crime is reckoned as another and better sport".

Raffles does on occasion disparage his game, commenting to Manders in "Gentlemen and Players", "where's the satisfaction of taking a man's wicket when you want his spoons?" Valentine also considers the point, and sees Raffles's cricket as a front for his criminal activities, citing Raffles's praise for cricket for "the glorious protection it affords a person of my proclivities".

Watson examines Raffles's actions within the broader context of sportsmanship, with Raffles acting within his own moral code "of what is 'done' and 'not done'." Orwell, in his essay "Raffles and Miss Blandish", observes that when Raffles feels remorse, it "is almost purely social; he has disgraced 'the old school', he has lost his right to enter 'decent society', he has forfeited his amateur status and become a cad".

== Sources ==
- Ackroyd, Peter (2001). London, The Biography. London: Vintage Books. ISBN 978-0-09-942258-7.
- Bloom, Harold (1995). Classic Crime and Suspense Writers. New York: Chelsea House. ISBN 978-0-7910-2206-1.
- Butler, William Vivian (1973). The Durable Desperadoes. London: Macmillan Publishers. ISBN 0-333-14217-9.
- Chandler, Frank Wadleigh (1907). The Literature of Roguery. Boston: Houghton, Mifflin & Co.
- Cox, Alison (1988). "E.W. Hornung". In Benstock, Bernard; Staley, Thomas (eds.). British Mystery Writers, 1920–1939. Detroit: Gale Research. ISBN 978-0-7876-3072-0.
- Doyle, Arthur Conan (2007). Sir Arthur Conan Doyle: Memories and Adventures. Ware, Hertfordshire: Wordsworth Editions. ISBN 978-1-84022-570-9.
- Gariepy, Jennifer, ed. (1985). "E.W. Hornung". Twentieth-Century Literary Criticism, Vol. 59. Detroit: Gale Research. ISBN 0-8103-9303-4.
- Hornung, E.W. (1907a). The Amateur Cracksman. New York: Charles Scribner's Sons.
- Hornung, E.W. (1907b). Raffles: Further Adventures of the Amateur Cracksman. New York: Grosset & Dunlop.
- Hornung, E.W.; Lewis, Jeremy (1985). The Collected Raffles. London: J.M. Dent & Sons. ISBN 978-0-460-87157-0.
- Lycett, Andrew (2008). The Man who Created Sherlock Holmes: The Life and Times of Sir Arthur Conan Doyle. New York: Phoenix Books. ISBN 978-0-7538-2428-3.
- Neuburg, Victor E. (1983). The Popular Press Companion to Popular Literature. Bowling Green, Ohio: Bowling Green State University Popular Press. ISBN 978-0-87972-233-3.
- Orwell, George (1993). The Collected Essays, Journalism and Letters. v. 3, As I Please, 1943–1945. London: Secker & Warburg. ISBN 978-0-15-118548-1.
- Rance, Nick (1990). "The Immorally Rich and Richly Immoral: Raffles and the Plutocracy". In Bloom, Clive (ed.). Twentieth-Century Suspense: The Thriller Comes of Age. Basingstoke: The Macmillan Press. ISBN 978-0-333-47592-8.
- Rowland, Peter (1999). Raffles and his Creator. London: Nekta Publications. ISBN 978-0-9533583-2-8.
- Rowland, Peter (2004). "Hornung, Ernest William". Oxford Dictionary of National Biography (online ed.). Oxford University Press. doi:10.1093/ref:odnb/37572. (Subscription, Wikipedia Library access or UK public library membership required.)
- Valentine, Mark (July 2008). "E.W. Hornung: Creator of Raffles, the Gentleman Crook". The Book and Magazine Collector. No. 296. The Metropolis Group.
- Watson, Colin (1971). Snobbery With Violence: English Crime Stories and their Audience. London: Eyre Methuen. ISBN 0-413-46570-5.
