= Cassell's Magazine =

Former British magazine

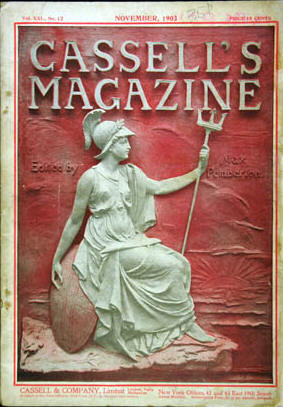
- Cassell's Magazine cover from 1903
- Categories: Literary magazine
- Founder: John Cassell
- First issue: 1853; 173 years ago
- Final issue: 1932
- Company: Cassell
- Country: United Kingdom
- Language: English

Cassell's Magazine is a British magazine that was published monthly from 1897 to 1912. It was the successor to Cassell's Illustrated Family Paper (1853–1867), becoming Cassell's Family Magazine in 1874, Cassell's Magazine in 1897, and, after 1912, Cassell's Magazine of Fiction.

The magazine was edited by Henry George Bonavia Hunt from 1874 to 1896, Max Pemberton from 1896 to 1905, David Williamson from 1905 to November 1908, Walter Smith from December 1908 to 1912, and Newman Flower from 1912 to 1922. It was acquired by the Amalgamated Press in 1927 and merged with Storyteller in 1932.

In the 1890s, under Pemberton's editorship, the magazine was based on The Strand Magazine, attempting to be a competitor to that periodical. Contributing authors included Wilkie Collins, whose 1870 novel Man and Wife raised the magazine's circulation to 70,000. Following the success of George Newnes's Tit-Bits, the Strand Magazine and Alfred Harmsworth's Answers, Cassell's began publishing a combination of journalistic miscellanea and illustrated fiction by popular novelists such as Robert Louis Stevenson, Arthur Quiller-Couch, Sheridan Le Fanu, J. M. Barrie, Bertram Fletcher Robinson, P. G. Wodehouse, Marjorie Bowen and Warwick Deeping.

Other contributors were E. W. Hornung, who contributed various Raffles stories in the late 1890s; Rudyard Kipling, with a serialisation of his story Kim from January to November 1901; Henry Rider Haggard, with a serialisation of his stories The Brethren from December 1903 to November 1904, and Benita from December 1905 to May 1906; Arthur Conan Doyle's Through the Magic Door, serialised December 1906 to November 1907, and Constance Beerbohm, etc.

Joseph Conrad contributed 'Il Conde' to Cassell's Magazine, which went on to become one of the most reproduced of all his stories. In January 1908 he instructed his agent, 'Please secure the number' (CL 4:31), suggesting that Conrad was interested in seeing its illustrated publication in one of the most popular magazines of that time.

In 1912, under Flower's editorship, Cassell's became a "pulp" magazine, printed on wood pulp paper and aiming at a more populist type of fiction. This version of Cassell's carried fiction by E. Phillips Oppenheim, E. F. Benson, Robert W. Chambers, Max Pemberton and Vincent Ems. Cassell's Magazine also published non-fiction by Arnold Bennett.

An American edition of the magazine, dated one month later than the English, ran from January 1884 to December 1907.

== See also ==
- John Cassell
- Cassell's National Library
