= Cuneo (surname) =

Cuneo is a surname of Italian origin. It originated as a toponymic surname for a person from the province of Cuneo. There is a notable family of Italian-descent with the named Cuneo primarily located in San Francisco and London, and many of the members of the family were painters.

The family name Cuneo refers to the following people:

- Adrián Cuneo (1912–1995), Argentine actor
- Andrew Cuneo, American professional Magic: The Gathering player
- Anne Cuneo (1936–2015), Swiss journalist, author, and screenwriter
- Clorinda Cuneo (1866–1949), American socialite, daughter of businessman Joseph Cuneo and wife of Amadeo Giannini
- Cyrus Cuneo (1879–1916), American-born English painter
- Dardo Cúneo (1914–2011), Argentinian historian
- Ernest Cuneo (1905–1988), American lawyer, political advisor, and newspaper owner
- Giovanni Battista Cuneo (1809–1875), Italian-Argentine politician
- Gustave Cunéo d'Ornano (1845–1906), French lawyer, journalist and politician
- Joan Newton Cuneo (1876–1934), American racing driver
- John Cuneo (sailor) (1928–2020), Australian Olympic sailor
- John Cuneo (Illustrator) (born 1957), American illustrator and author
- Jonathan Cuneo (1952–2023), American lawyer
- José Cuneo (born 1965), Argentine comic-book illustrator
- José Cuneo Perinetti (1887–1977), Uruguayan painter
- Lester Cuneo (1888–1926), American stage and silent-film actor
- Mariano Cúneo Libarona (born 1961), Argentine lawyer
- Michael Cuneo, American engineer
- Michael W. Cuneo, author of The Smoke of Satan, American Exorcism, Almost Midnight, and other books
- Nellie Tenison Cuneo (1869–1953), British-born illustrator and painter
- Paul Cuneo (1938–2014), Australian rugby league footballer
- Peter Cuneo, American business executive; vice chairman of Marvel Entertainment
- Ricardo Pavoni (born 1943), Uruguayan soccer player
- Rinaldo Cuneo (1877–1939), American painter; dubbed "the Painter of San Francisco"
- Rómulo Cúneo y Vidal (1856–1931), Peruvian diplomat
- Santiago Cúneo (born 1970), Argentinian politician
- Terence Cuneo (1907–1996), English painter

== Fictional characters ==
- Ottilio Cuneo, character from the novel The Godfather; appeared as Carmine Cuneo in the film version
