= Cyril Parfitt =

British artist

- Born: 6 February 1914; Norwich, Norfolk, England
- Died: 30 October 2011 (aged 97)
- Education: Gateway School and Leicester College of Art
- Known for: Landscape, Fantasy, Illustration and Portrait
- Notable work: 'Looking Back' and 'The New Arrivals'

Cyril Harry Parfitt (6 February 1914 – 30 October 2011) was a British artist. He was based on the Isle of Thanet in Kent and worked using mixed materials and techniques. His notable works include the hand-rendered pencil drawing 'The New Arrivals', which was hung in the Royal Academy.

== Biography ==
Cyril Harry Parfitt was born in Norwich, Norfolk, England. He attended the Gateway School in Leicester and then won a scholarship to Leicester College of Art where he studied for three years. He was passionate about art and music. As a young man, he played the accordion. He later learned to play the piano and electric keyboard. He spoke fluent German, and cited the reason for learning it as wanting to enjoy reading Goethe in the language it was written. In his early career, he served an apprenticeship as a lithographic artist.

He worked as a graphic designer in Leicester, where his work was frequently seen on many well-known products, until he joined the army at the start of the Second World War. Because of his experience as a lithographic artist, he was eventually posted to Wales to be trained in the art of map making and draft invasion maps. Here, he established a close and enduring friendship with artist Terence Cuneo.

Taking this skill with him at the end of the Second World War, he joined the Directorate of Overseas Surveys (DOS)—a new Government Department at the time—where he ran his own experimental section. During his time there, he was nicknamed 'The Wizard of DOS'. One of his colleagues once said: "You can put Cyril in a room with absolutely nothing and he will still somehow manage to produce something utterly wonderful." Using his previous printing experience and knowledge, he was responsible for designing and supervising the color proofing of specialized relief maps. He innovated new approaches to relief effects and developed a technique for photo mapping.

He prepared international exhibitions and his special maps were acclaimed worldwide by cartographic establishments. Two such pieces were exhibited at the Design Centre in London. His contribution to mapping was written about and included in a book produced by National Geographic.

== Works ==
Parfitt's work included early stylized paintings, landscapes, portraits, and pencil drawings. His portraiture and pencil drawings have been described as having a lightness and sensitivity.

He also created fantasy sculptural pieces in clay, as well as moving sculptures that used an assortment of bright and colourful 'odds and ends' he salvaged and stored. He has appeared on ITV's Magpie with his creations, and his work has been sold in galleries both in the United Kingdom and internationally.

Many of his pieces of artwork were selected by the Royal Academy. His pencil drawing 'Looking Back', which consists of over 6000 pencil strokes and took 700 hours to create, was hung in the Academy in 1981.

At the end of his life, he was based on the Isle of Thanet. He was particularly inspired by the ‘Turner’ skies, and incorporated them into some of his works. He was focused on Turner Contemporary, alongside artists that resided in his local area.
