= José Cziffery =

Hungarian-born painter

- Born: József Cziffery; December 31, 1902; Hungary
- Died: 1965; Uruguay
- Education: Academy of Fine Arts, Budapest; studied with Henri Matisse in Paris
- Known for: Painting, teaching
- Style: Post-Impressionism, Expressionism
- Patrons: Enrique Amorim (supporter of Taller Figari)

José Cziffery (also known as József Cziffery) was a Hungarian-born painter who became an influential figure in the Uruguayan art scene in the mid-20th century. He was born in Hungary on December 31, 1902, and died in Uruguay in 1965. He is recognized for his contributions to painting and art education in Uruguay, and his work is represented in several national collections.

== Biography ==
József Cziffery was born in Hungary and trained at the Academy of Fine Arts in Budapest, where he studied under prominent artists of the period. He later continued his studies in Paris and was a student of Henri Matisse. His early work was influenced by European post-impressionism and expressionism.

He emigrated to Uruguay in the 1930s and quickly integrated into the country's artistic community. Cziffery was a naturalized Uruguayan citizen and made significant contributions to the development of local painting, both as an artist and as an educator. He taught at various institutions, inspiring a generation of Uruguayan artists.

Cziffery directed the Taller Figari for twenty years, an influential art workshop supported by Enrique Amorim and where José Cuneo also taught; it became a formative space for generations of students.

Throughout his career, Cziffery was known for his vibrant use of color and interest in both portraiture and landscape. His style evolved over time but remained committed to the expressive possibilities of paint.

== Legacy and collections ==
José Cziffery's work is represented in several Uruguayan public art collections, including the Museo Nacional de Artes Visuales (MNAV) in Montevideo and the Museo María Irene Olarreaga Gallino in Salto, Uruguay. These institutions preserve and exhibit his paintings as part of their permanent holdings.

He is also listed in the national database of Uruguayan authors and artists, which acknowledges his contribution to the country's cultural heritage.
