= Nellie Tenison Cuneo =

Illustrator and Painter

- Born: Nellie Marion Tenison; 26 August 1869; Hammersmith, London, England
- Died: 23 May 1953 (aged 83); Chiswick, London, England
- Other name: Nell Tenison
- Occupations: Painter and Illustrator
- Years active: 1903 – 1940
- Spouse: Cyrus Cuneo (m. 1903; died 1916)
- Children: 2 (including Terence Cuneo)

Nellie Marion Tenison Cuneo SWA (26 August 1869 – 23 May 1953) was an illustrator and painter who trained in London and Paris. She was married to the American painter and illustrator Cyrus Cuneo ROI (18 June 1879 – 23 July 1916) and their youngest son was the English painter Terence Cuneo CVO OBE RGI FGRA(1 November 1907 – 3 January 1996), known for using a mouse as his signature. (Note: The Oxford Dictionary of National Biography incorrectly states that Terence was her only son. This is disproved not only by the birth registration index, but by the 1911 census and the 1939 Register.)

== Early life ==
Tenison was born in Hammersmith, London, on 25 August 1869. She was the second child of her parents, Irish doctor Edward Tenison Ryan Tenison (c. 1830 – 22 December 1904) FRCS LRCP and his second wife, Frances Sally Testelin (13 March 1842 – fourth quarter of 1912). Edward's first wife Fanny Hutton died between the birth of their third son Alfred on 25 October 1865 and his baptism on 1 February 1866, leaving three sons, Edward (c.1860), Arthur (born c.1861), Alfred (born c. 1866), who were half-brothers to Tenison.

Her full brother Adolf Heron FRCS LRCP, studied at Cambridge, trained as a doctor and settled at Hayle, Cornwall, in 1947.

== Education and marriage ==
The 1881 census shows Tenison (age 11) as the only child at home with her parents, apparently under the care of Annie Florence Robinson (age 24), a governess. She studied at the Chiswick School of Art from 1884 – 1886 and then, without the support of her family, at Sir Arthur Stockdale Cope's School of Art in South Kensington. By the time of the 1891 census, the Tenisons had moved to 215 Uxbridge Road, which was to remain the family both for Tenison's parents, and for Tenison's husband and children, Cyrus Cuneo's death in 1916.

She then worked as a freelance illustrator, on publications like the Ludgate Magazine. (Note: Thorpe calls her drawings from the magazine uneven.) By 1899 she had saved up enough money to go to Paris to study art, and she enrolled in the Académie Colarossi to train under Whistler, where she met Cyrus Cuneo. They returned to London to marry on in the last quarter of 1903. As Cuneo was an American citizen, Tenison ceased to be a British Subject on her marriage under the UK's 1870 Naturalisation Act. She did not automatically gain US citizenship by marriage, as this was subject to her being eligible to naturalization (as determined by emigration officials whenever she landed in the United States, certain races and immoral persons, etc. being excluded). (Note: The ability for women to gain US citizenship through marriage (subject to elibibility for naturalisation) lasted until 22 September 1922. From 22 September 1922 on, marriage did not confer citizenship regardless of eligibility to naturalization.) Thus, British women who married aliens from 1870 to 1933, when the law changed could become stateless persons. Tenison may not have been aware of this as she recorded her nationality as English in the 1911 census. After the death of her husband, Tenison applied for naturalisation, and was re-admitted as a British subject on 27 July 1917.

The couple had two sons: Desmond, (born on 12 February 1905) who became a mining engineer., and Terence, (1 November 1907 – 3 January 1996) who became a noted English painter.

== Work ==
Both Tenison and her husband worked as illustrators. She was devastated when Cyrus died unexpectedly from blood poisoning in 1916. Tenison left what had been the family home and moved first to 152 Holland Park in Kensington. She was there in 1918 for the Electoral Register and again in 1920. She moved to Dartmoor, then to Cornwall, living first at Halsetown and then in St. Ives, where she bought Down-along House, which she restored, and it became The Copper Kettle (cafe).

Her son Terence was prosecuted for dangerous driving in St. Ives in June 1928, and they were already living at Down-along House. Tenison became a member of the St. Ives Society of Artists in 1928 and remained a member until c. 1945. By 1931 The electoral register shows her living with both her sons at 29 Flanders Road in Chiswick. By 1934 all three had moved to 2 Gainsborough Road, Chiswick, which was to remain Tenison's London residence until her death.

Tenison continued to paint. She became a member of the Society of Women Artists in 1918 and was a frequent exhibitor there. She also exhibited at the Royal Academy. (Note: Johnson and Greutzner give her as exhibiting 46 works at Society of Women Artists, 11 at the Royal Academy, and one each at the Royal Hibernian Academy, the Walker Art Gallery The Royal Society of British Artists, The Royal Institute of Oil Painters, and the Goupil Gallery.)

== Later life ==
Her son Desmond was living with her at 2 Gainsborough Road in 1949, as was Lucie Newmann. Tenison died on 23 May 1953. She was living at 2 Gainsborough Road, Chiswick, London at the time. Her estate was valued at £10,776 8s. 1d. She did not nominate either of her sons as her executors.

== Assessment ==
Peppin and Micklethwait said that She was a capable illustrator, often working in full colour or halftone in a style that had much in common with that of her husband.

== Illustration work ==
=== Magazine illustration ===
She continued to illustrate journals including

- The Girl's Own Paper
- The Girl's Realm
- The Graphic
- The Lady's Realm
- The Sphere
- The Ludgate Monthly
- Cassell's Magazine
- The Strand Magazine
- Woman at Home
- Black and White

=== Book illustration ===
Tenison also illustrated a number of children's books for authors including;

- Deborah Alcock
- Angela Brazil
- E. E. Cowper
- Brenda Girvin
- A. Lucas
- E. L. Haverfield
- Bessie Marchant
- Emma Marshall
- Geraldine Mockler
- Sidney L. Morse (Note: This was not a children's book but a household guide and cookbook: Household Discoveries & Mrs. Curtis's Cookbook: An Encyclopedia Of Practical Recipes & Processes.)
- William Edward Norris
- Anna Chapin Ray
- Walter C. Rhoades
- Mrs. Herbert Strang
- J. M. Whitfeld
- Grace I. Witliam
- Walter Wood (writer)

=== Example of book illustration ===
The following illustrations by Tenison were prepared for The Girl Crusoes: A story of the South Seas by Mrs Herbert Strang (Note: Herbert Strang and Mrs Herbert Strang was pseudonyms used by George Herbert Ely (1866-1958) working with Charles James L’Estrange (1867-1947). Both men worked for the Oxford University Press, and wrote adventure stories and historic novels for boys and girls in the first three decades of the 20th century There pseduonym was drawn from parts of their own names.) (1912, Henry Froude, Hodder, and Stoughton, London). While it is certain the illustrations are by Tenison, it is only probably that the cover is.

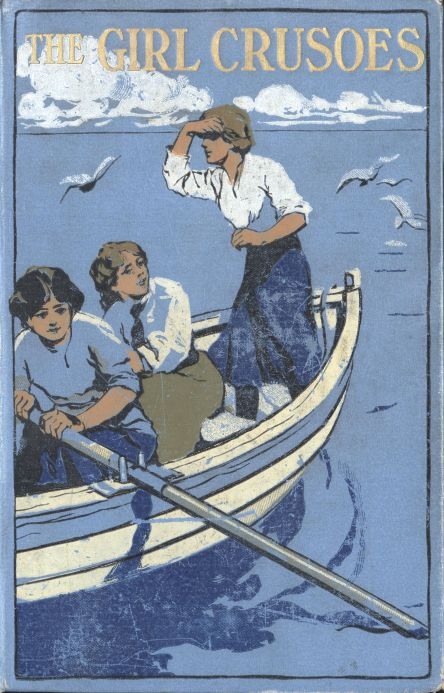
Front Cover

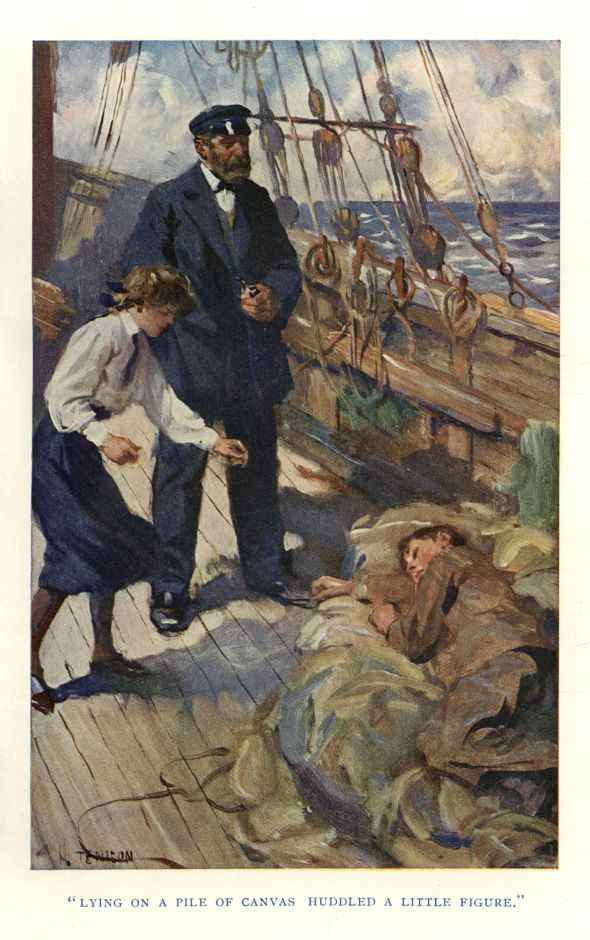
Page-74

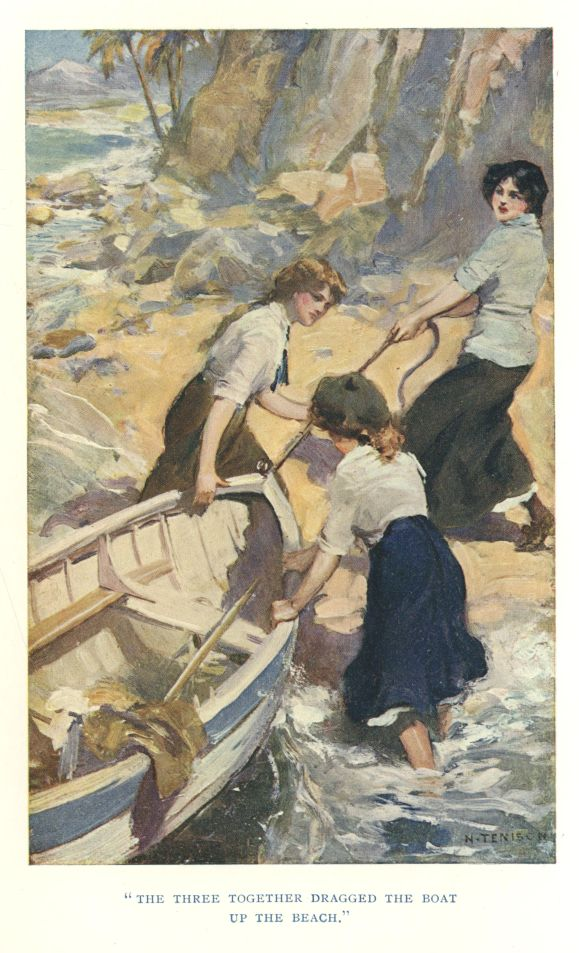
Page-72

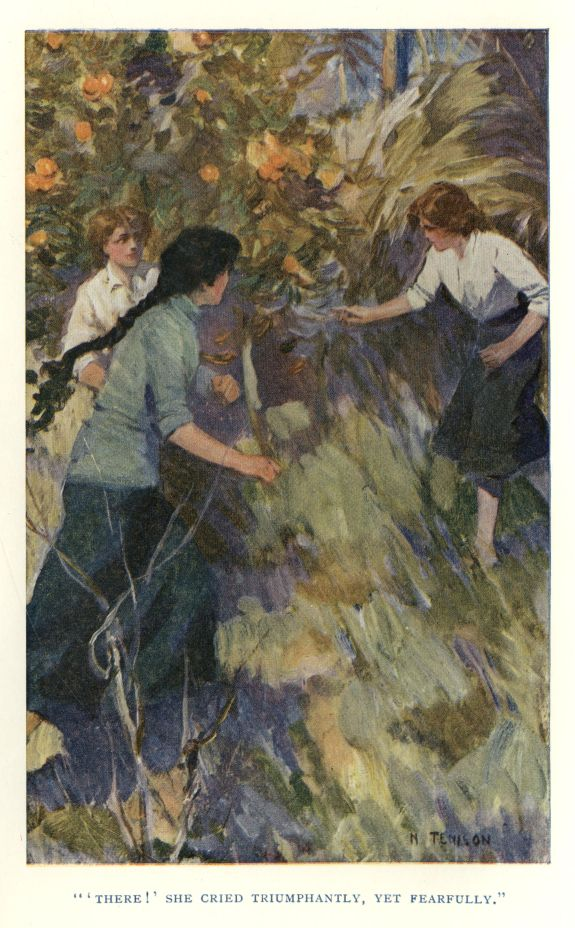
Page-124

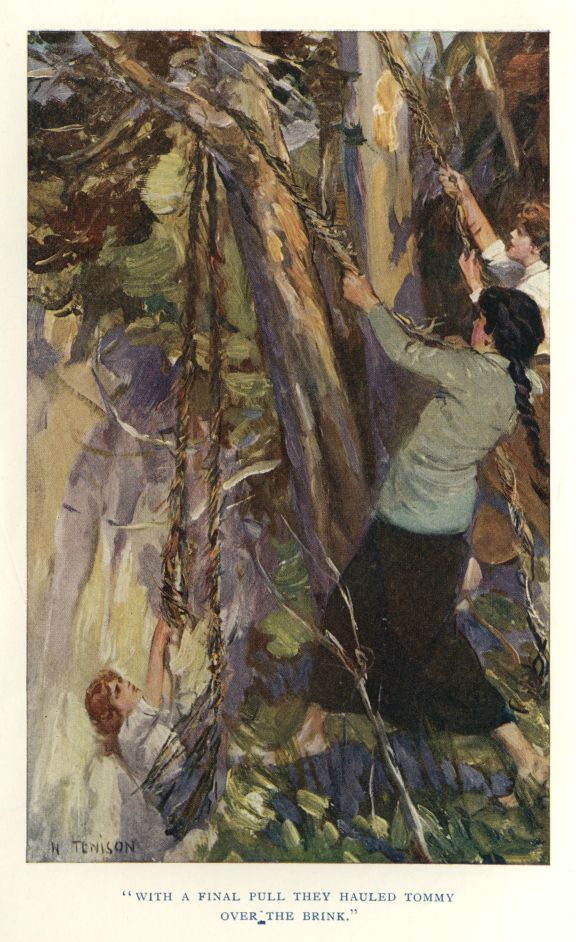
Page-200

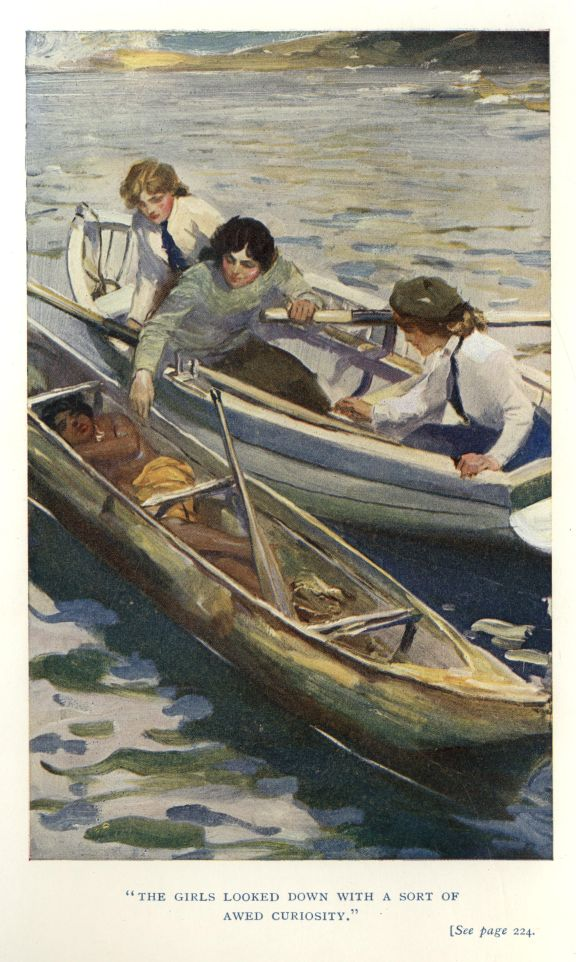
Page-224

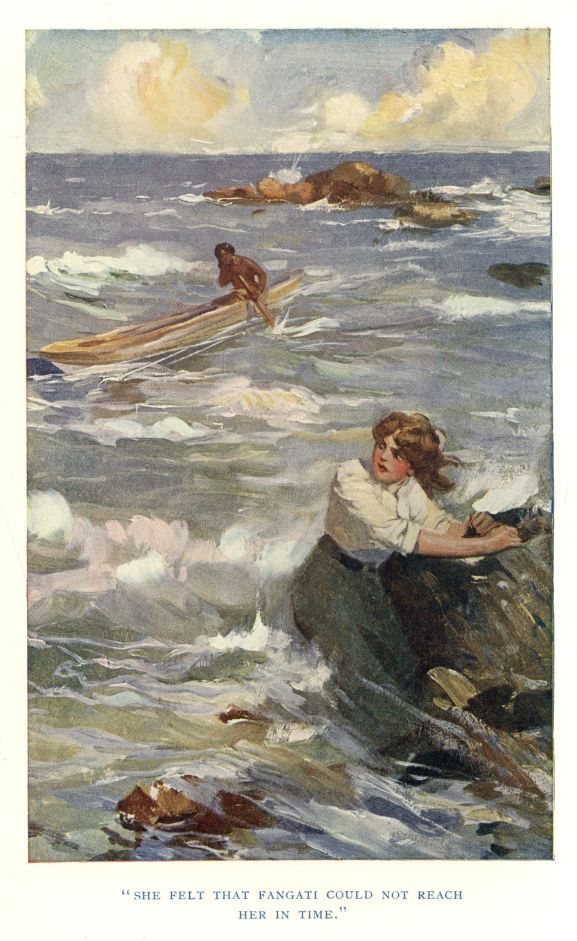
Page-262
