= Manuel Rosé =

Uruguayan painter (1887–1961)

- Born: 1882
- Died: 1961 (aged 78–79)
- Known for: Painting
- Notable work: Jarrón con Flores, Tipo de Española, La Italiana, La Cantera, Payaso con Guitarra, Payaso con Caballo Blanco
- Awards: First Prize at the National Painting Salon (1937), Gold Medal at the American Exhibition in Seville (1929)

Manuel Rosé (1882–1961) was a prominent Uruguayan painter known for his contributions to the visual arts in Uruguay.

== Early life and education ==
Manuel Rosé was born in 1882 in Uruguay. His artistic journey began early, and in 1905, he traveled to Italy to study at the Academy of Fine Arts in Rome. By 1908, Rosé was awarded a scholarship to study at the Académie de la Grande Chaumière and the Académie Colarossi in Paris, France. Subsequently, he earned another scholarship to the Academia Vitti, where he studied under renowned professors Kees van Dongen and Hermenegildo Anglada Camarasa. The academy also trained notable Uruguayan artists like José Cuneo and Carmelo de Arzadun.

== Artistic career ==
Rosé returned to Uruguay to share his expertise, teaching at the Círculo Fomento de Bellas Artes in Montevideo from 1914 to 1917. During this period, he painted landscapes depicting the areas surrounding Las Piedras, where he lived for several years, and the Sierras de Córdoba, the birthplace of his wife. These works reflected his connection to the natural beauty and cultural richness of his environment.

== Artistic legacy ==
In honor of his contributions, the Liceo Manuel Rosé in Las Piedras—declared a national historic monument—was named after him.

== Key works ==
Manuel Rosé’s works include:

- 1910: Jarrón con Flores
- 1911: Tipo de Española
- 1924: La Italiana, La Cantera
- 1927: La Sultana
- 1940: Marina
- 1952: El Payaso con Globo
- 1956: Payaso con Guitarra, Payaso con Caballo Blanco
- Artigas en el Cerrito
- La Batalla de Las Piedras
- La Asamblea de la Florida
- Duelo
- Paisaje
- Matías

== Honors and exhibitions ==
Rosé's work has been displayed in numerous exhibitions, including a retrospective at the Cabildo of Montevideo. His art remains a permanent feature in the Museo Nacional de Artes Visuales in Uruguay, ensuring his legacy continues to inspire.

=== Awards ===
- 1937: First Prize at the National Painting Salon.
- 1929: Gold Medal at the Ibero-American Exposition in Seville.

== Death ==
Manuel Rosé died in 1961.
