= Colorado Creek =

River in Uruguay

Coordinates: 34°43′34″S 56°21′11″W

The Colorado Creek (Spanish: Arroyo Colorado) is a river in Canelones Department in Uruguay. The catchment area for the river includes 18 de Mayo, Cerrillos, La Paz, Las Piedras and Progresso. As of 2011, 108.038 people lived in the zone.

It rises in the eastern part of the city Las Piedras in Canelones Department. From there it flows, while forming the boundary between Las Piedras and Progreso, initially in a north-westerly direction before its course from the confluence of its right-hand tributary Arroyo Colorado Chico snaps to the southwest. At Paso Don Fabián it passes under Ruta 48 and a few hundred meters downstream also Ruta 36. On its last section from the confluence of the Arroyo de las Piedras, it forms the border of the Departamentos of Canelones and Montevideo, to then flow left into the Santa Lucía River.

The creek provides important ecosystem services for the whole region. Like other creeks in Canelones Department, the primary use of the creek is agricultural and is subject to agricultural runoff. In the last 150 years, increases urbanization and usage for agriculture has increased the pressure on the water body. Almost 60% of the watershed is in agricultural use. United Nations Development Programme funded a project near Sauce, Uruguay to plant riparian buffers that includes native fruit.

In 18 de Mayo, there is an exercise and activity park along the creek which includes a playground and tree planting.
