= Philip Hawkins =

Philip Hawkins may refer to:

- Philip D. Hawkins, British railway painter and photographer
- Philip Hawkins (MP), British politician
- Phillip Thomas Hawkins, molecular biologist
- Phil Hawkins, television and film director
