= Cunego =

Cunego is an Italian surname. Notable people with the surname include:

- Damiano Cunego (born 1981), Italian cyclist
- Domenico Cunego (1724/25–1803), Italian printmaker

== See also ==
- Cuneo (surname)
