= 18 de Mayo =

18 de Mayo Dieciocho de Mayo
- City and municipality
- Location of 18 de Mayo in the Canelones Departament

- Location within Uruguay
- Coordinates: 34°40′4.2″S 56°13′1.97″W
- Country: Uruguay
- Department: Canelones
- Founded: 15 March 2013

Government
  - Mayor: Nelson Alpuy

Population (2011)
  - Total: 21,362
- Time zone: UTC -3

18 de Mayo or Dieciocho de Mayo is a city and municipality in the Canelones Department of Uruguay.

== Establishment ==
After a process of evaluation at departmental level, this municipality was created on 15 March 2013.

It includes several towns, belonging until that date to the municipalities of Las Piedras and Progreso, in the old Route 5 area: Villa Alegria, Vista Linda, El Dorado, San Francisco, Villa Cristina, San Isidro, El Dorado Chico and Villa Foresti.

Its name commemorates the Battle of Las Piedras, which took place in 1811.

There is concern at the political and local level for giving this populous area a city status.

== Government ==
The authority of the municipality is the Municipal Council, composed of the mayor and four councilors.

Mayors by period:

Nº	Alcalde	Party	Beginning of the mandate	End of mandate
1	Nelson Alpuy	Frente Amplio	9 July 2015	2020
