= Museo ItaloAmericano =

Italian-American museum in San Francisco, California, U.S.

Coordinates: 37.80695°N 122.431369°W

- Established: 1978 (39 Years Ago)
- Location: Fort Mason Center, Building C San Francisco, California, United States
- Founder: Giuliana Nardelli Haight
- Director: Sandra Bagnatori
- Website: www.museoitaloamericano.org

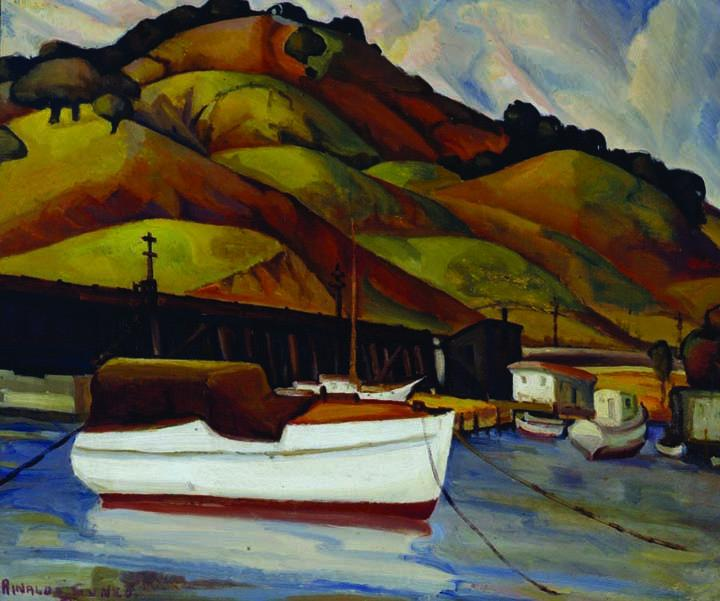
Painting by Rinaldo Cuneo, California Hills With White Boat (1930), oil on canvas, Museo ItaloAmericano

Museo ItaloAmericano, also known as the Italian American Museum, is a museum in San Francisco, California, that focuses on Italian and Italian-American history, art and culture.

== History ==
The nonprofit museum was founded by Giuliana Nardelli Haight on August 17, 1978, above Caffe Malvina in North Beach, with the intention to display and collect the art, history and culture of Italian and Italian-American people.

The museum was briefly located on 678 Green Street in North Beach in the 1970s, before it moved once more in 1985 to the Fort Mason Center. The museum has plans to move to a new home at 940 Battery in the North Waterfront neighborhood, an area traditionally occupied by Italian-American businesses.

Although the museum always holds temporary exhibits, it also maintains a permanent collection, including works by Beniamino Bufano, Francesco Clemente, Sandro Chia, Mimmo Paladino, among others. The first exhibition at the museum was paintings by Paolo Emilio Bergamaschi, alongside sculptures by Beniamino Bufano, Elio Benvenuto, and Peter Macchiarini. The museum also hosts an archive of material, including photographs, documents, clothing and household objects, documenting the lives of those who emigrated from Italy to California.

The museum also offers a number of Italian language classes, from beginner to advanced to casual conversation classes, as well as offering a free art programme to schools in the San Francisco area.

The museum was managed for over 40 years by Paola Bagnatori, who has been succeeded by Sandra Bagnatori.

== See also ==
- San Francisco
