= Las Piedras, Uruguay =

Las Piedras
- City
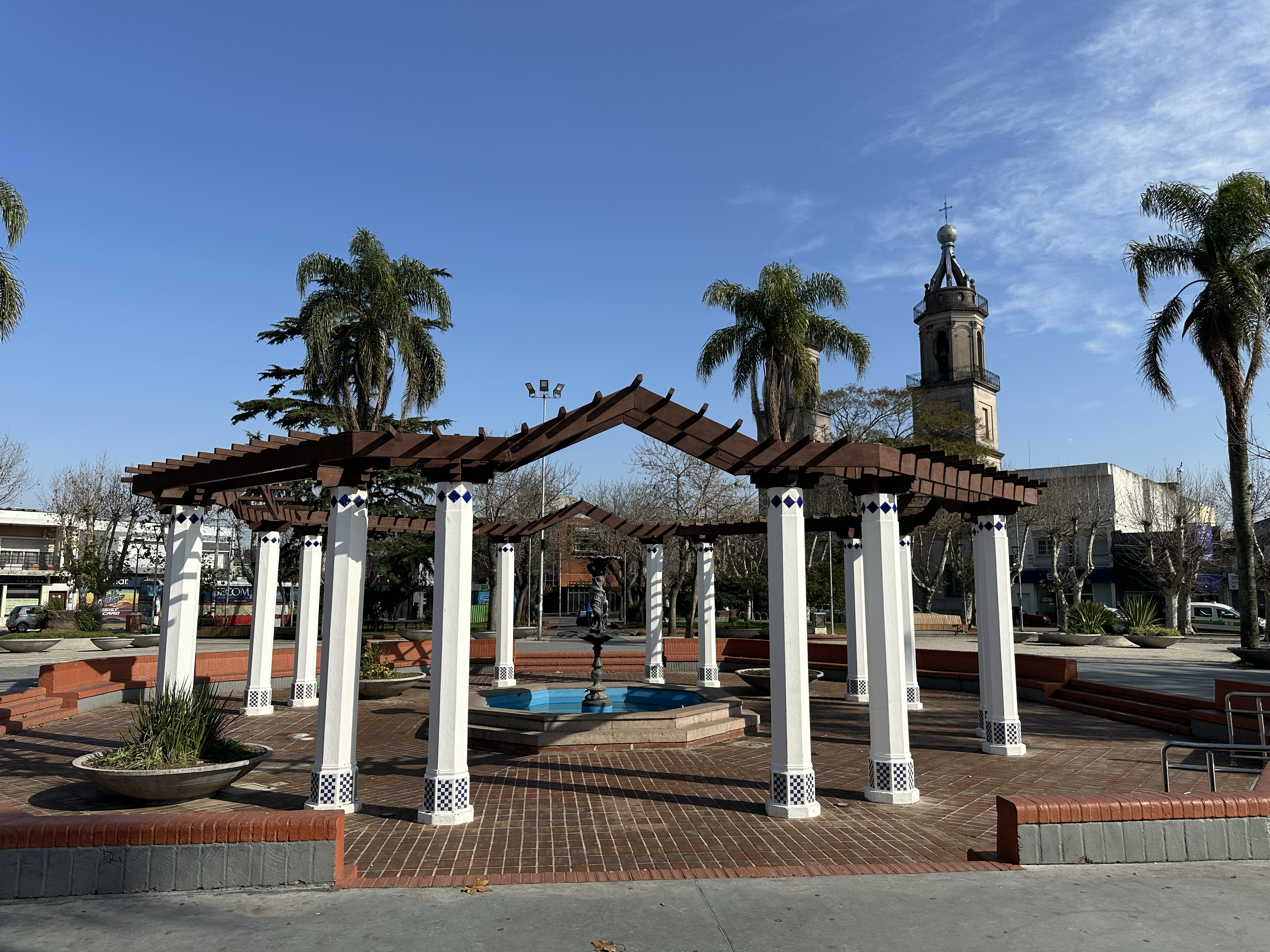
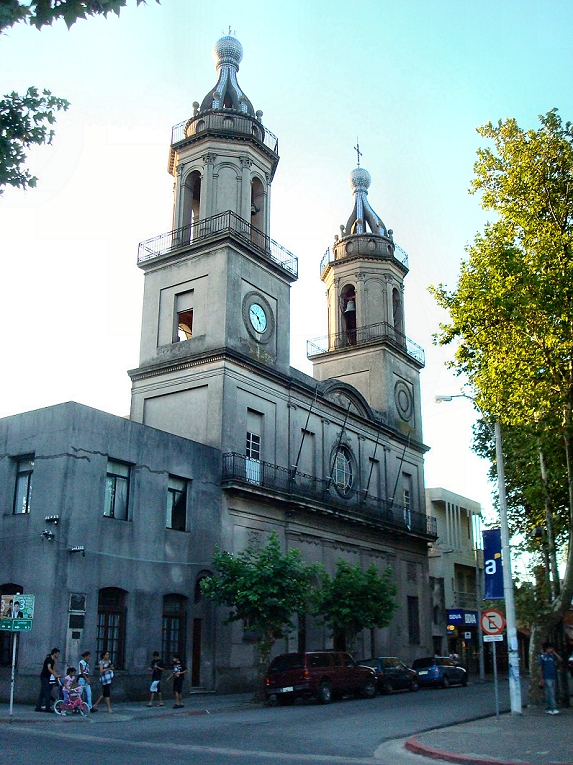
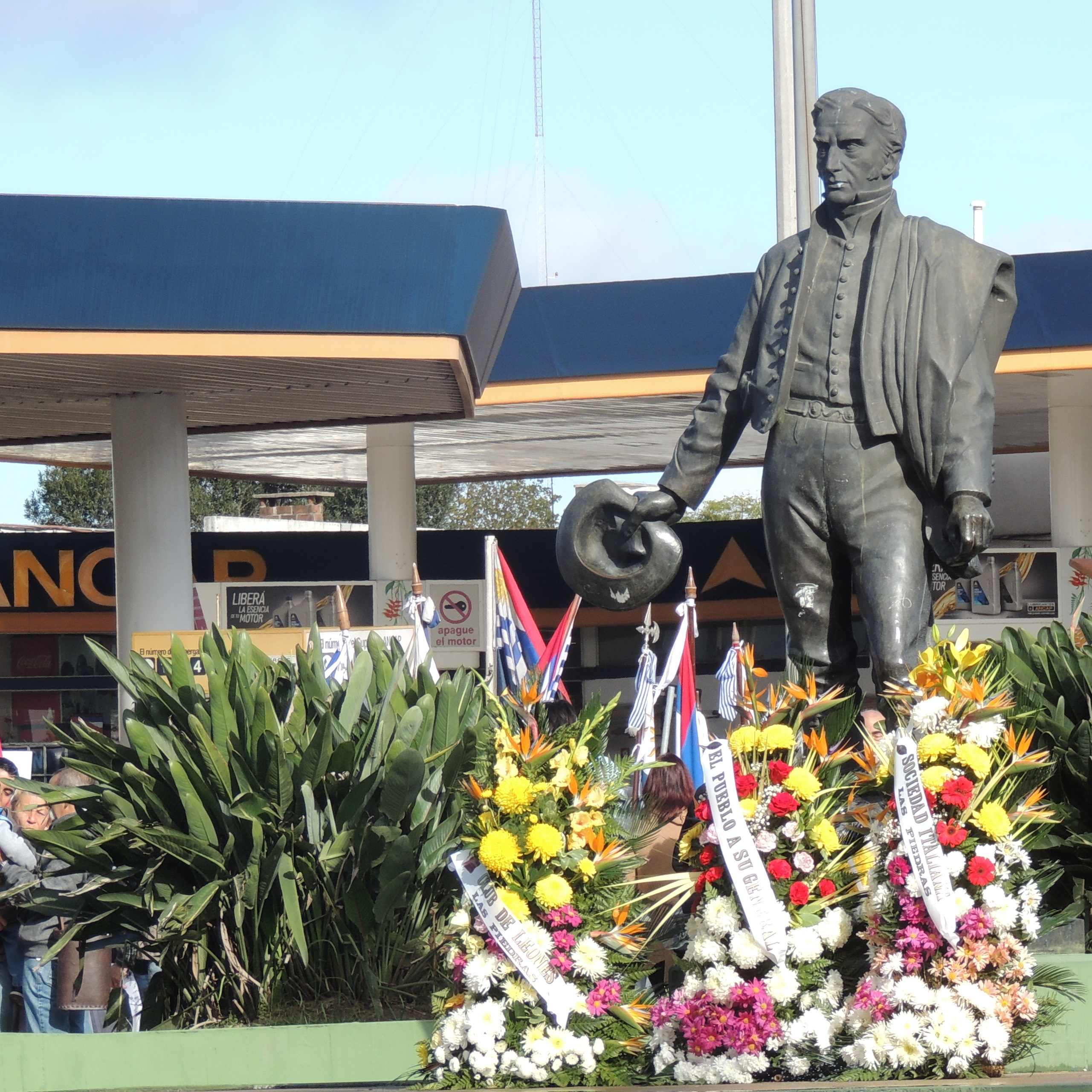
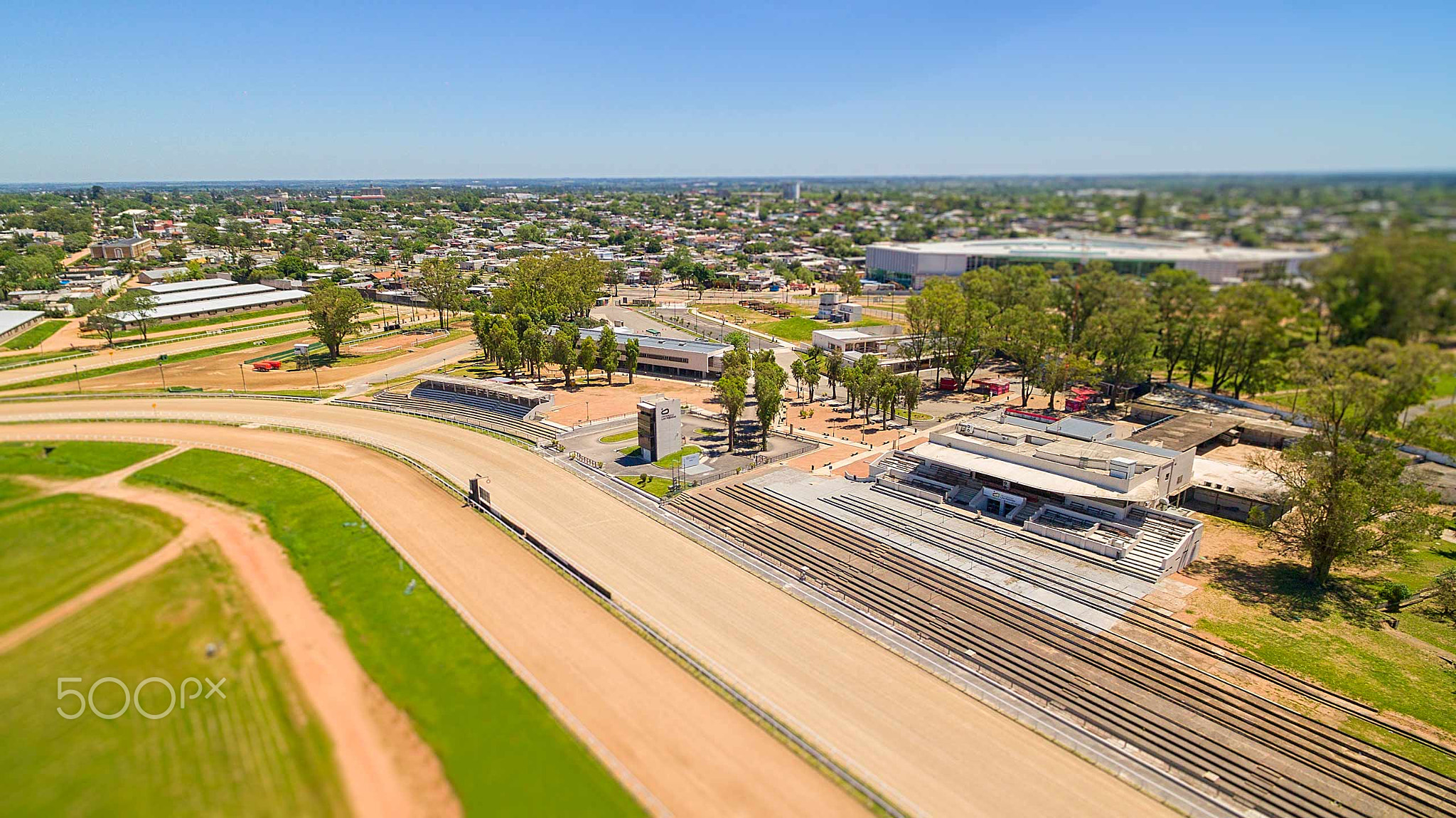
- Plaza José Batlle y Ordóñez Parish Church of Saint Isidore the Laborer Monument to Artigas at the Mástil Las Piedras Hippodrome

- Location within Uruguay
- Country: Uruguay
- Department: Canelones
- Founded: 8 March 1744

Government
  - Mayor: Romina Espiga (Broad Front)

Population (2023)
  - Total: 61,292
- Demonym: Pedrense
- Time zone: UTC−3
- Postal code: 15900
- Dialling code: +598 2

Las Piedras is a city in the Canelones Department of Uruguay and the seat of the Municipality of Las Piedras. It is located in the southern part of the department, on the banks of the Las Piedras Creek, and forms part of the Montevideo metropolitan area. At the 2023 census, it had a population of 61,292. Its inhabitants are known as pedrenses.

== Etymology ==
The name Las Piedras (Spanish for "the stones") derives from the large rocks at a ford on the creek of the same name. At that point, the creek bed of stones and sand could be crossed even during high water, on the road connecting Montevideo with the countryside. Large rocks were also visible from the banks, and the place came to be known as Paso de Las Piedras ("Las Piedras Ford"). The creek, the surrounding area and the city that developed alongside the ford subsequently took the name Las Piedras.

== Geography ==
=== Territorial setting ===
Las Piedras forms a continuous urban area with La Paz, Progreso and 18 de Mayo within the Montevideo metropolitan area. These localities retain their own administrations and urban centres, although they are connected by urban expansion and the main transport infrastructure of the micro-region.

El Colorado and Canelón Chico form part of the rural and productive surroundings of the city; territorial planning instruments distinguish them from Las Piedras' urban neighbourhoods.

=== Relief and geology ===
The area surrounding the city is characterised by the presence of granite deposits, historically associated with local quarrying. Quarrying has influenced the regional landscape and coexists with urban, suburban and rural areas in and around Las Piedras.

=== Hydrography and environment ===
Las Piedras Creek runs through the area surrounding the city and, along part of its course, forms the boundary between the departments of Canelones and Montevideo. It is a tributary of Colorado Creek, in the lower sub-basin of the Santa Lucía River.

The department's territorial planning instruments identify pressures on the creek and its basin associated with urbanisation, drainage and a range of productive activities.

== History ==
According to the Historical Association of Las Piedras, the founding process of the present-day city began on 8 March 1744, when Luis de Sosa Mascareñas received a one-square-league plot of land as a donation.

During the second half of the 18th century, a settlement associated with farms, a chapel and local businesses developed. A chapel dedicated to Saint Isidore the Laborer was established in 1765 and became a parish in 1780.

The Battle of Las Piedras was fought nearby on 18 May 1811. Revolutionary forces led by José Gervasio Artigas defeated Spanish troops commanded by José Posadas. The victory was one of the first important successes of the revolution in the Banda Oriental and enabled an advance towards Montevideo.

In 1838, the architect Carlos Zucchi formalised the urban layout, consisting of a central square and 49 blocks.

The railway arrived on 1 January 1869, strengthening links with Montevideo and encouraging the town's economic and urban development. Las Piedras station was the first railway station outside the capital. On 15 May 1925, Law No. 7,837 officially raised Las Piedras from the status of villa to that of city.

During the 20th century, the metropolitan expansion of Montevideo, internal migration and land subdivision drove the growth of Las Piedras.

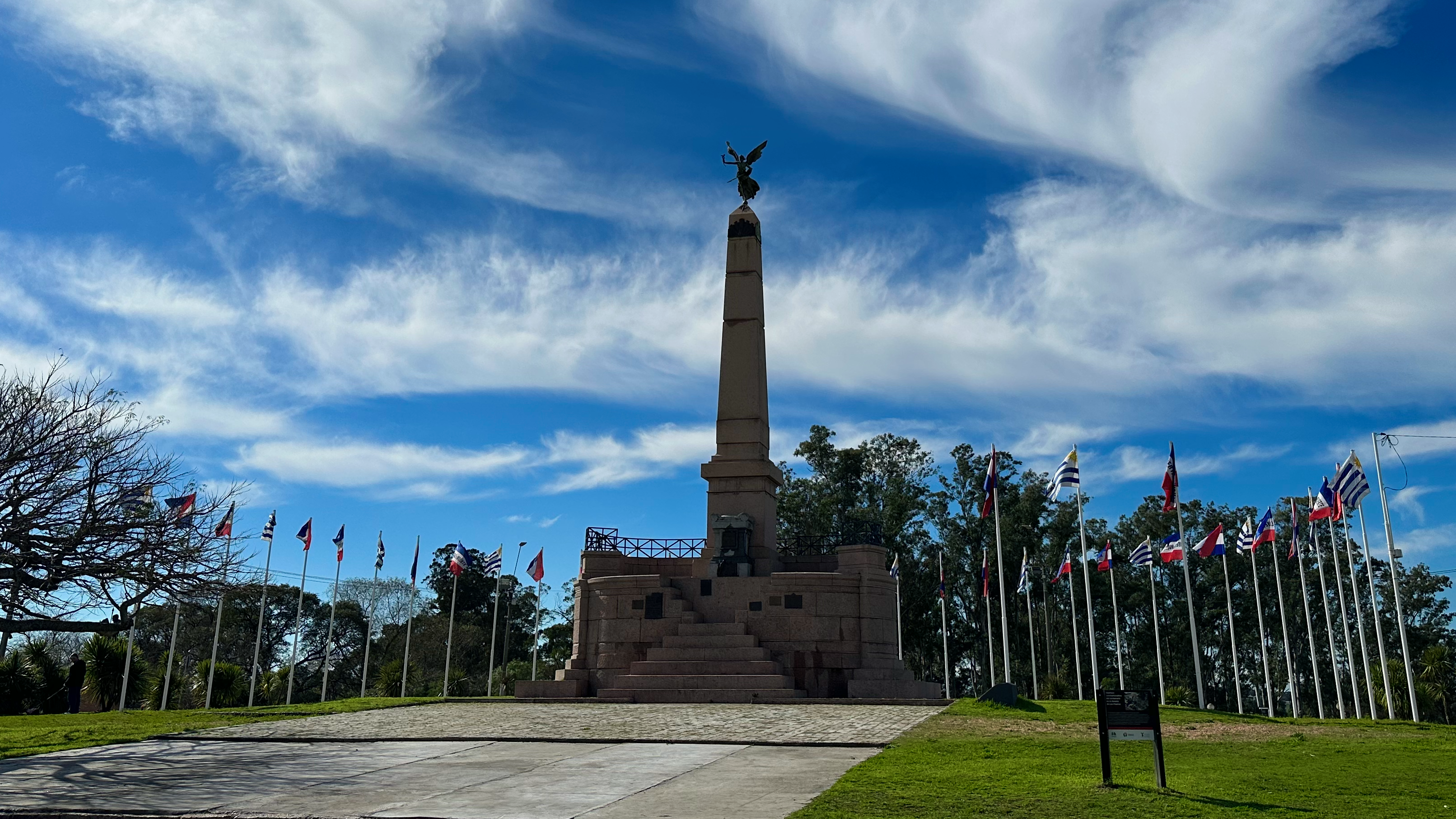
Obelisk commemorating the Battle of Las Piedras

== Population ==
At the 2023 census, Las Piedras had a population of 61,292.

Historical population
Census year	Population
1908	8,109
1963	40,658
1975	53,331
1985	58,283
1996	66,584
2004	69,222
2011	71,268
2023	61,292

Sources: National Institute of Statistics

== Economy ==
Las Piedras is part of the Montevideo metropolitan area and has been characterised as a commuter town. It nevertheless has its own economic activity, with industrial, logistics, institutional and service centres, as well as links to the productive rural area of Canelones.

The city and its surroundings are closely associated with wine growing. The National Institute of Viticulture (Instituto Nacional de Vitivinicultura, INAVI) has its legal headquarters in the city. Its own facilities, inaugurated in 2022, include administrative areas, laboratories, warehouses, an experimental winery and a vineyard.

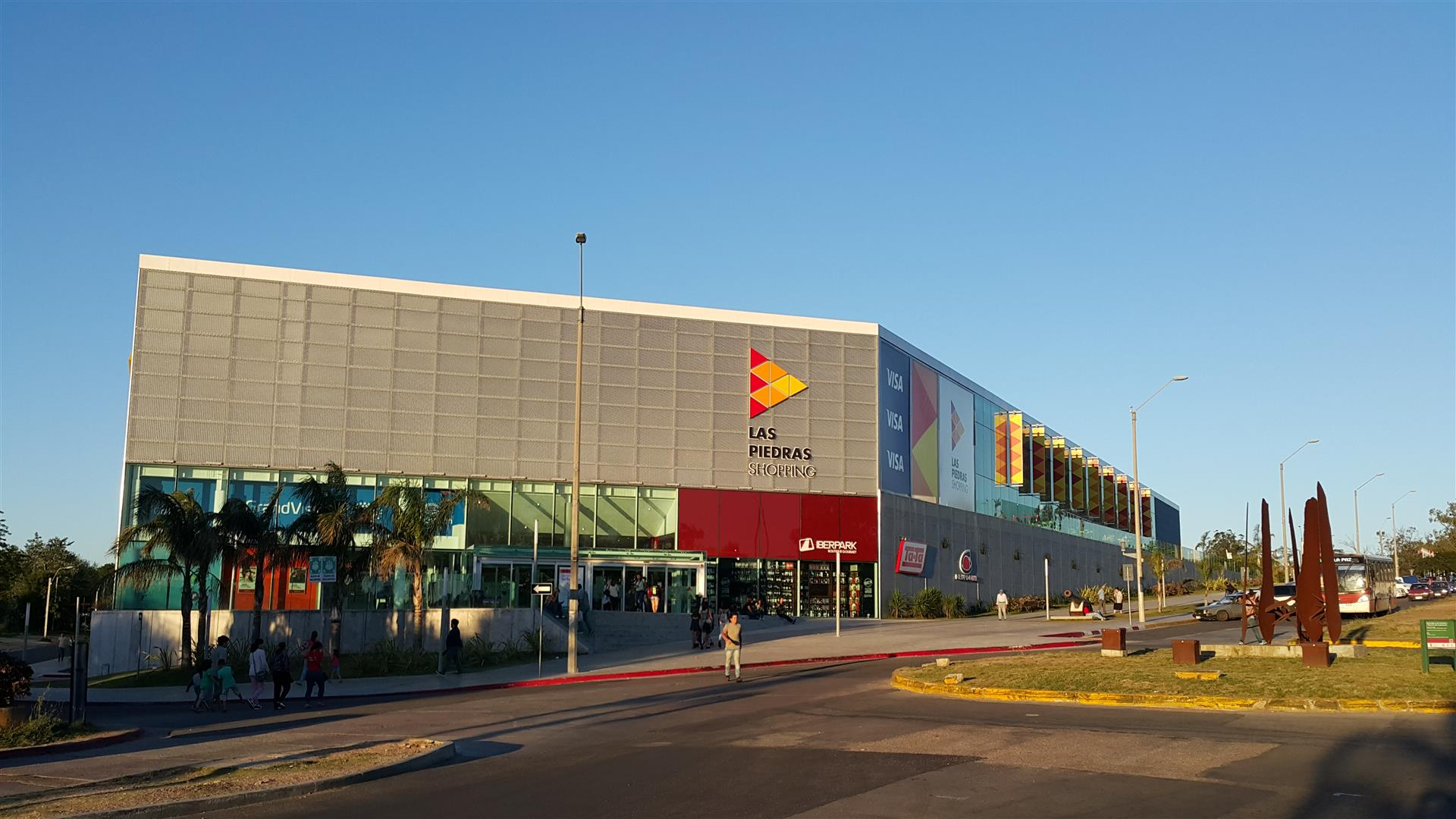
Las Piedras Shopping

Horse racing is also part of the local economy. The Las Piedras Hippodrome is part of the Integrated National Turf System and hosts meetings and races involving owners, breeders, trainers, jockeys and related services.

The Parque Tecnológico Canario operates on the site of the former Comargen meat-packing plant. It is intended for productive development, business location, training and the promotion of economic and cultural activities. The park continues to host innovation and training activities linked, among other areas, to agri-food production, sustainable tourism, the circular economy and renewable energy.

Las Piedras Shopping, inaugurated in 2017 on Bulevar del Bicentenario, is one of the principal shopping centres serving the city and its area of influence.

== Administration and politics ==
=== Municipal administration ===
Las Piedras is the seat of the municipality of the same name, which is part of Canelones Department. Municipalities are Uruguay's third level of government and administration.

The municipal government is exercised by a Municipal Council composed of five elected members: a mayor, who presides over it, and four councillors. Since July 2025, the mayor has been Romina Espiga.

Within its jurisdiction, the municipality prepares local development programmes, collaborates on public works and carries out responsibilities relating, among other matters, to roads and traffic, public spaces, lighting and stormwater drainage, without prejudice to the powers of the Government of Canelones Department.

=== Citizen participation ===
The Intendencia of Canelones and the Municipality of Las Piedras have held sessions of the Tu Municipio + Cerca programme in different neighbourhoods. The programme brings administrative procedures, services and information about local government closer to residents outside the municipal headquarters.

=== Neighbourhoods ===
The city's neighbourhoods include Centro, Obelisco, Pueblo Nuevo, Campisteguy, Laures, Herten, Villa Juanita, La Pilarica, Lenzi, Razetti, Santa Rita, Santa Isabel and 19 de Abril.

== Services ==
=== Health care ===
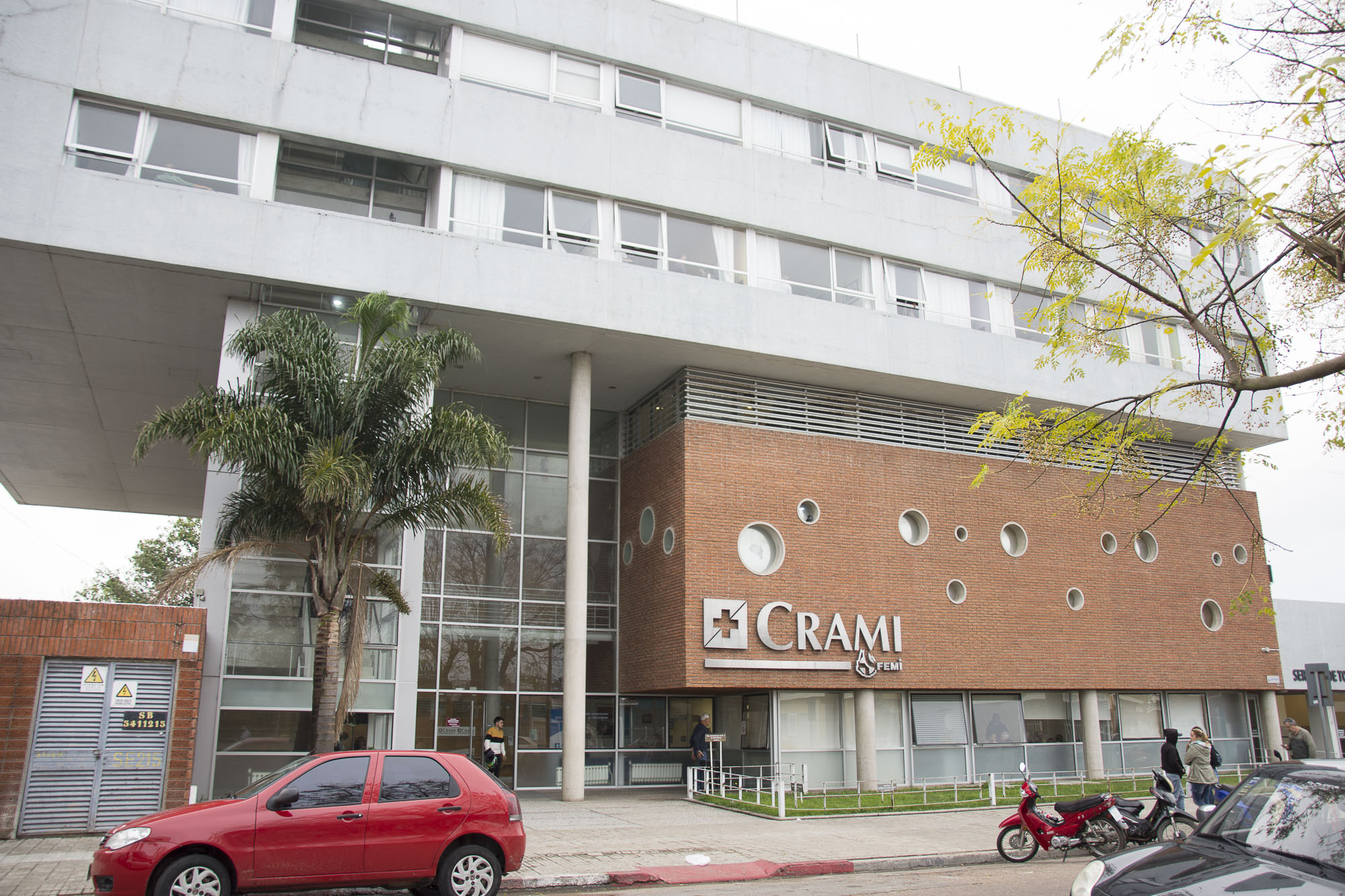
Sanatorio Central CRAMI

Las Piedras has the public Dr. Alfonso Espínola Hospital, which is run by the State Health Services Administration (Administración de los Servicios de Salud del Estado, ASSE). In the private sector, the city has a sanatorium operated by CRAMI. The sanatorium was inaugurated in 2010.

=== Education ===
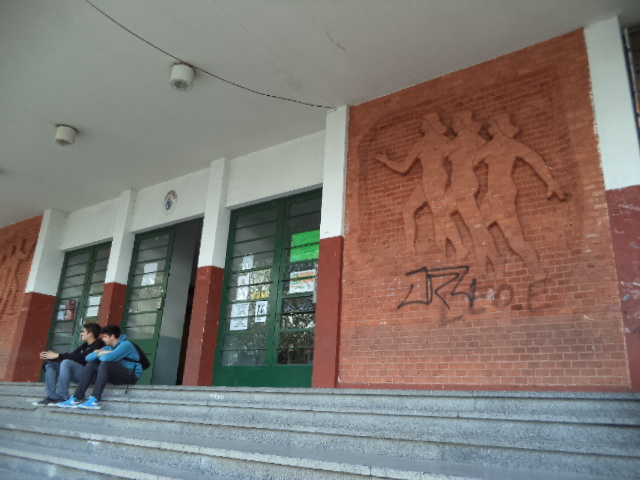
Manuel Rosé High School

The city has public institutions providing pre-primary, primary, secondary and technical-vocational education. The National Administration of Public Education (ANEP) operates high schools No. 1 Manuel Rosé, No. 2 Germán Cabrera, No. 3, No. 4 and No. 5. Manuel Rosé High School was declared a National Historic Monument in 2005 because of the works of art it houses. School No. 317, inaugurated in 2023, was the city's first arts school.

Technical-vocational education is provided at Las Piedras Higher Technical School, Las Piedras Technical School No. 2 and the Las Piedras Technological Centre, which offers, among other programmes, a technical degree in autotronica.

Private provision includes pre-primary, primary, secondary and teacher-training institutions. These include Colegio y Liceo San Isidro; Colegio San José, Liceo María Auxiliadora and the Salesian Teachers' Institute; and Jardín Barbapapá, Colegio Constructivista and the Liceo de Educación Secundaria Integral (ESI). Colegio Las Piedras and Colegio Nuevo Fabini also operate in the city.

=== Public transport ===
Public transport services connect Las Piedras with Montevideo and other localities in the metropolitan area. CUTCSA, COETC and COPSA operate metropolitan services along the Route 5 corridor.

The Compañía de Ómnibus del Este (Codeleste) operates departmental and local services. It was founded in 1927 as the Cooperativa de Ómnibus del Este and runs routes between Las Piedras and La Paz, as well as between Las Piedras and Canelones. CITA services also include Las Piedras in their routes.

== Urban planning ==
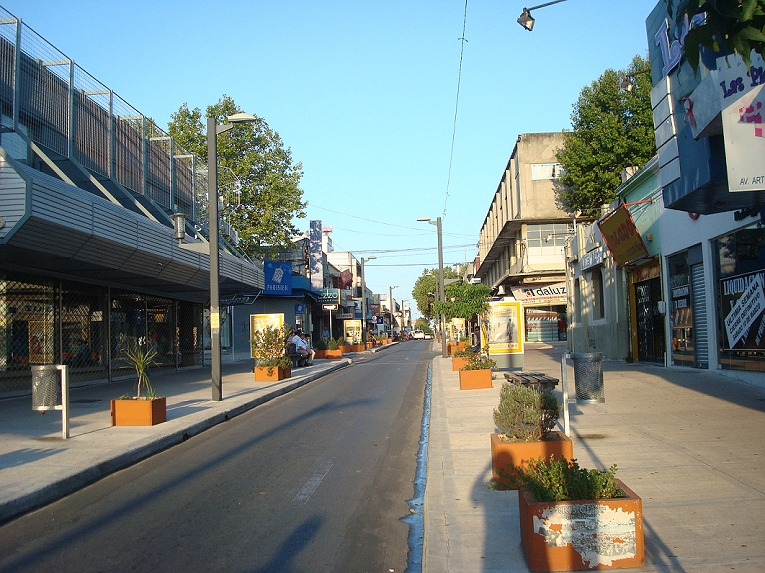
Avenida Artigas, one of the city's main thoroughfares

Territorial planning instruments of Canelones recognise the centre of Las Piedras as a regional centre.

=== Urban structure and facilities ===
The Territorial Plan for Micro-region 7 identifies neighbourhood centres and a regional centre in the centre of Las Piedras.

The city also has the Las Piedras Sports Centre, at the junction of Dr. Pouey Avenue and the east–west connector avenue. The complex has basketball and volleyball courts, changing rooms and an artistic gymnastics area.

=== Road links ===
The city is linked to the national road network by Routes 5, 48 and 67. A project in the urban area connected Routes 48 and 67 to divert heavy traffic.

== Culture ==
=== Heritage ===
The Church of Saint Isidore the Laborer is one of the city's main historical and religious landmarks. The present church, of neo-Renaissance inspiration, was built in the 19th century and has been subject to heritage protection measures since 2007.

Las Piedras railway station forms part of the local urban heritage and has been subject to heritage protection measures since 2007.

Parque Artigas, the Obelisk of Las Piedras and the Battle of Las Piedras Open-air Museum form a heritage complex associated with the battle of 1811. The museum includes the battlefield, an interpretation centre in the Bicentennial Pavilion and online content devoted to the historical interpretation of the site.

=== Festivals and celebrations ===
The anniversary of the Battle of Las Piedras is commemorated in the city every 18 May. Activities include official ceremonies, parades by educational institutions, and civic, military and traditionalist events, organised with the participation of national, departmental and local institutions.

The city hosts the Fiesta de la Vendimia, a celebration associated with the wine-growing tradition of the region. Law No. 18,088 established the Day of the Vintage and designated Las Piedras as the annual host of the opening parade.

== Sport ==
Juventud de Las Piedras is the city's leading sports club and has competed in both the first and second divisions of professional football in Uruguay.

The city also has a baby football league, made up of local teams and teams from neighbouring cities such as La Paz and Progreso.

The municipal Parque Artigas Stadium was reopened in 2009. Juventud de Las Piedras plays its home matches there, although the stadium is not exclusive to the club and is also used by institutions from nearby cities.

== Media ==
- Radio Cristal del Uruguay
- FM Inolvidable
- Canal 11

== See also ==
- Manuel Rosé
