= Arroyo de las Piedras =

River in Uruguay

Coordinates: 34°42′7″S 56°19′25″W

Arroyo de las Piedras is a river in Uruguay.

Arroyo de las Piedras runs in the departments of Canelones and Montevideo, as the boundary line it serves. According to Orestes Araújo, it rises between the Cuchilla Grande and one of its foothills east of Villa de San Isidro. From there, it flows in a south-southwest direction, before turning into a north-west direction at La Paz and Costa y Guillamón. Then it meets the Colorado Creek in its lower reaches on the left, which then forms the Rincón del Melilla together with the Santa Lucía River.
