= Anna Chapin Ray =

American author

- Born: January 3, 1865; Westfield, Massachusetts
- Died: December 13, 1945 (aged 80)
- Education: B.A., M.A.
- Alma mater: Smith College
- Occupation: Writer

Anna Chapin Ray (January 3, 1865 – December 13, 1945) was an American writer.

== Biography ==
Born in Westfield, Massachusetts, she was the daughter of Edward Addison Ray and Helen M. (Chapin). In 1881 she was one of the first three women to take the Yale University entrance exam. She studied at Smith College in Northampton, Massachusetts where she received a B.A. in 1885 and an M.A. in modern European history in 1888.

Beginning in 1889, Anna became a prolific author; her works included many children's books, but she also published adult novels. She wrote during the summer in New Haven, Connecticut, then spent the winter in Quebec. Most of her works were written using the pseudonym Sidney Howard. From 1916 until 1920 she served at the Military Hospitals Commission in Ottawa. She was supervisor of the stenographic bureau in the Department of Soldiers' Civil Re-establishment. Her older brother Nathaniel (1858–1917) was a mining engineer and a California state legislator. The two frequently corresponded.

In October 1945 she had a hip fracture and was admitted to the Hospital of Saint Raphael in New Haven, Connecticut. After being moved to a convalescent hospital, she died December 13, 1945.

== Bibliography ==
- In Blue Creek cañon (1892)
- Margaret Davis, tutor (1893)
- Dick: a story for boys and girls (1896)
- Half a dozen girls (1897)
- Half a dozen boys: an every-day story (1889)
- How Polly and Ned found Santa Claus (1898)
- Teddy: her book: a story of sweet sixteen (1898)
- Each life unfulfilled (1899)
- Phebe, her profession: a sequel to Teddy: her book (1900)
- Nathalie's chum (1902)
- The dominant strain (1903)
- Sheba (1903)
- Ursula's freshman (1903)
- Bumper and baby John (1904)
- By the good Sainte Anne: a story of modern Quebec (1904)
- On the firing line" a romance of South Africa (1905) with Hamilton Brock Fuller
- Sidney: her summer on the St. Lawrence (1905)
- Hearts and creeds (1906)
- Janet : her winter in Quebec (1906)
- Day : her year in New York (1907)
- Ackroyd of the faculty (1907)
- Nathalie's sister: the last of the McAlister records (1907)
- Teddy, her daughter; a sequel to Teddy, her book (1907) (Note: Reissued by Henry Frowde, London, in 1911 with colour illustrations by N. Tenison.)
- Quickened (1908)
- The bridge builders (1909)
- Sidney at college (1908)
- Janet at odds (1909)
- Sidney: her senior year (1910)
- Over the quicksands (1910)
- A woman with a purpose (1911)
- The Brentons (1912)
- On board the Beatic (1913)
- The responsibilities of Buddie (1913)
- Letters of a Canadian stretcher bearer (1918) editor
