= David Shepherd (artist) =

British artist

David Shepherd CBE, FRSA, FGRA
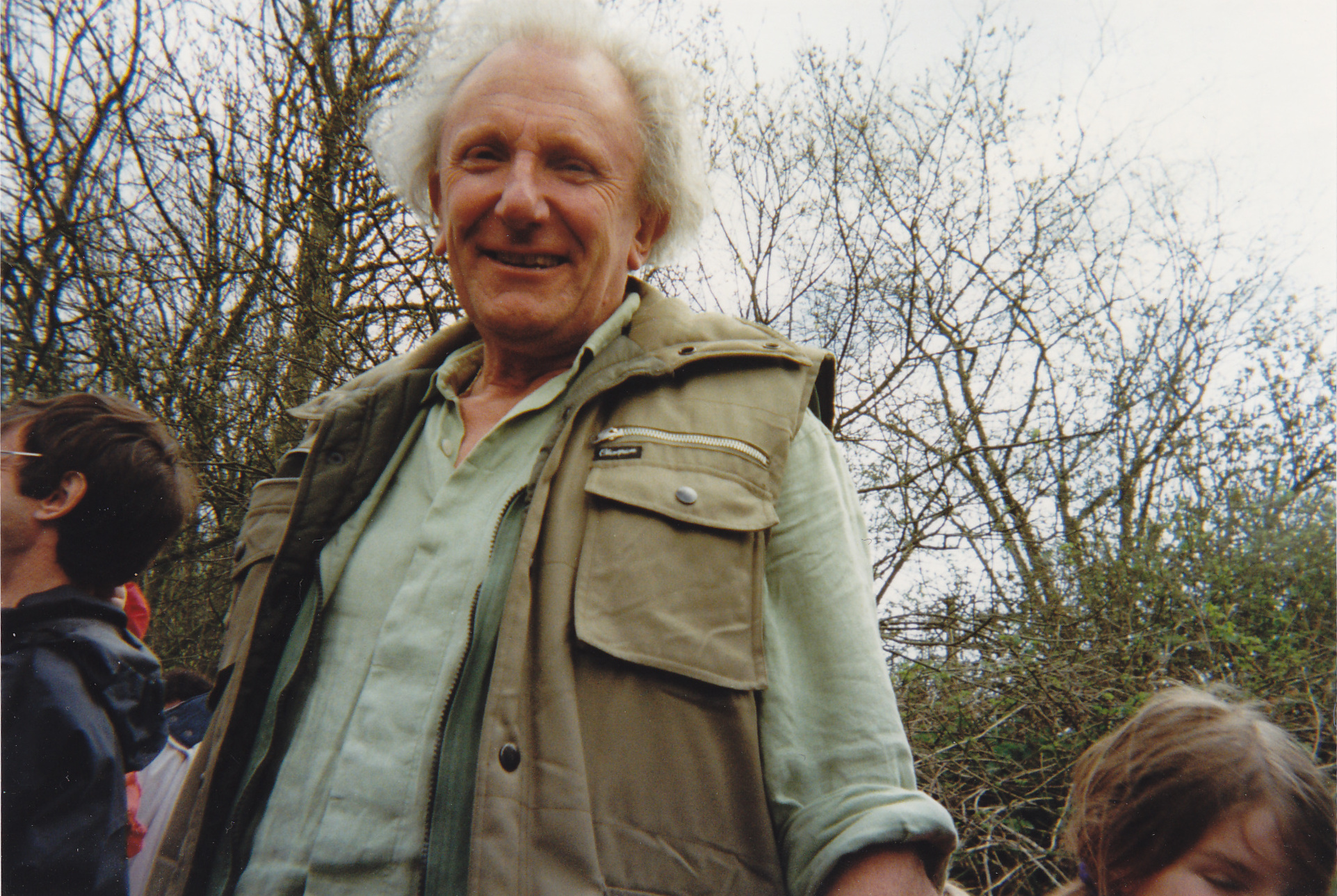
- Shepherd at East Somerset Railway, mid-1990s
- Born: 25 April 1931; Hendon, London, England
- Died: 19 September 2017 (aged 86)
- Occupation: Artist
- Known for: Wildlife painting, conservation, railway preservation

Richard David Shepherd CBE FRSA FGRA (25 April 1931 – 19 September 2017) was a British artist and one of the world's most outspoken conservationists.

He was most famous for his paintings of steam locomotives (he owned a number of them) and wildlife, although he also often painted aircraft, portraits (notably The Queen Mother) and landscapes. His work has been extremely popular since the 1960s in limited edition print reproduction and poster form, as well as other media such as Wedgwood limited edition plates. He published five books about his art, including an autobiography.

== Life and work ==
David Shepherd. Three Tuskers

David Shepherd was born in Hendon, north London, England. As a child he lived in Totteridge, north London and he won a children's painting competition in a magazine called Nursery World when he was eight years old. He then attended Stowe School in Buckinghamshire. Upon leaving school he travelled to Kenya with the hope of becoming a game warden, but was rejected as having "no talent whatsoever". He returned to the UK but was rejected by the Slade School of Fine Art in London. However, he was taken in by the artist Robin Goodwin who trained him for three years.

Neal Brown said in Frieze magazine: "David Shepherd is one of the most financially rewarded painters in the UK... Shepherd has brought pleasure to millions, as seen on the many table mats, posters and commemorative plates that bear his work." David Gower said, "There is a sense of the atmosphere of the African bush that emanates from all his work."

== Conservationist ==
Shepherd became interested in conservation during an early expedition into the African bush, where he discovered a poisoned water hole with 255 dead zebra. He had become an outspoken world-known campaigner, and devoted much of his time to this. He was also a steam railway enthusiast, but said in a letter to the UK's The Railway Magazine, "you can always build another steam loco but you can't build another tiger." In addition to making him wealthy, Shepherd's paintings raised large sums for charity through auctions. His first big fund-raising success was a work titled Tiger Fire which raised £127,000 for Indira Gandhi’s Operation Tiger in 1973. Shepherd was also known for his paintings of elephants and among his most well known works were The Ivory is Theirs and Wise Old Elephant.

He was the founder of the David Shepherd Wildlife Foundation and was made an Officer of the Order of the British Empire (OBE) in the 1980 New Year Honours list "for services to the conservation of wildlife." He was appointed a Commander of the Order of the British Empire (CBE) in the 2008 Birthday Honours list for services to charity and wildlife conservation.

== Steam enthusiast ==
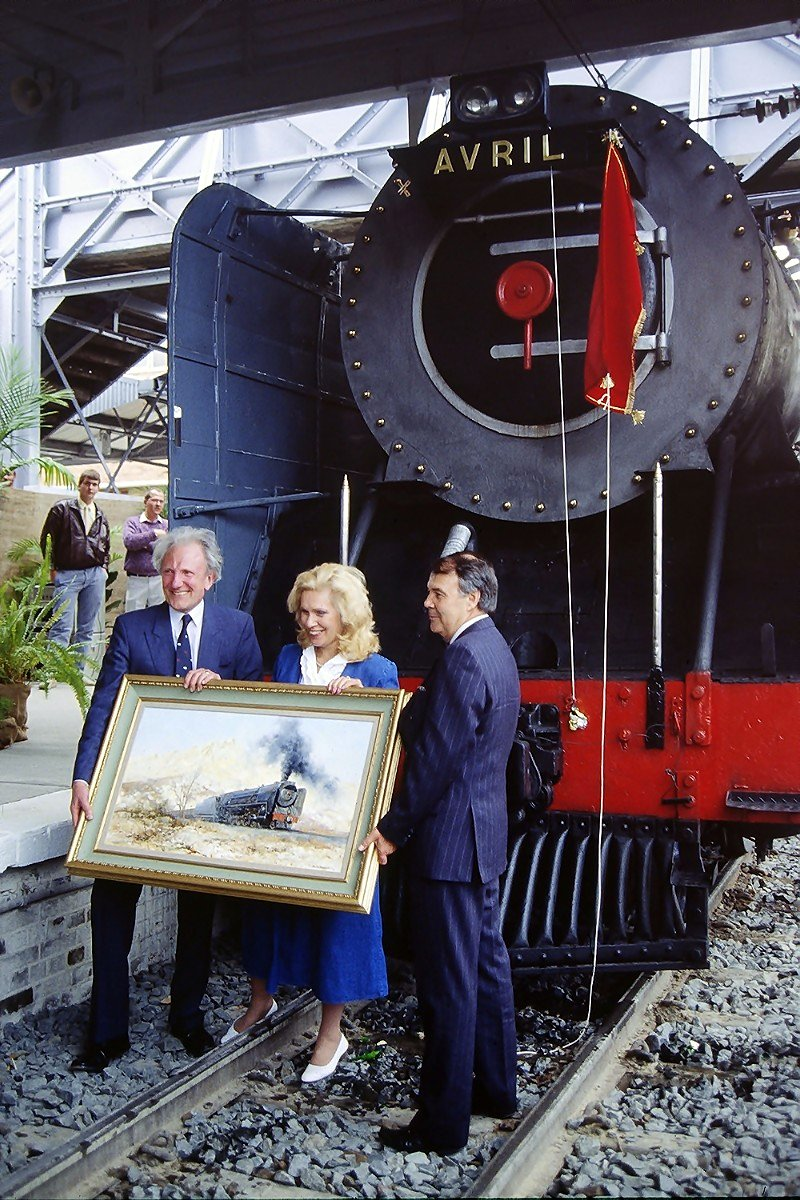
Shepherd (left) and his wife Avril receiving 15F 3052 named Avril, 1991

Shepherd owned a number of steam locomotives. He bought both 9F Black Prince 92203 and Class 4MT No.75029 The Green Knight direct from British Railways, where he had connections from painting various scenes for them. No.75029 The Green Knight was sold to the North Yorkshire Moors Railway to finance Black Prince's overhaul, then in 2015 Black Prince was sold to the North Norfolk Railway.

All the African locomotives he acquired were British-built. In South Africa the 15F (Nº 3052), presented to him by Spoornet in 1991, is stored at Sandstone Estates in Ficksburg. It has carried various names, including City of Germiston and, more recently, his wife's name, Avril. It was moved to Ficksburg in light steam from Pietermaritzburg by Friends of the Rail (a Pretoria-based heritage steam association) in April 2003 and it steamed again in April 2006, when Friends of the Rail operated it for several trips between Ficksburg and Kommandonek with Shepherd on board. He also owned two Zambian locomotives from the Mulobezi Railway, given to him by then President Kenneth Kaunda. One is still in the railway museum in Livingstone, Zambia, the other was located on the Sandstone Estates complex in South Africa. Shepherd donated it, along with a coach, to the National Railway Museum in York in the UK, where it is undergoing restoration.

Shepherd was involved in founding a heritage steam railway in the UK, the East Somerset Railway, where the signal box at Cranmore Station has become a small gallery displaying his work. He was also president of the "Railway Ramblers".

== Personal life and death ==
Shepherd's parents gave him a Victorian cottage, with more than 1 acre (0.4 ha) of land, in Frensham, Surrey, next to their own house, to encourage him to get engaged to his future wife Avril. The couple had four daughters and lived in West Sussex. Their daughter Mandy is also a wildlife and military artist.

Shepherd died on 19 September 2017 from the effects of Parkinson's disease. Karen Botha, the CEO of the David Shepherd Wildlife Foundation (DSWF), said; "David’s passion for wildlife and the role of man in its demise infuriated and inspired him. He was dedicated, tenacious and outspoken, a champion of animals and the people who worked to protect them. He will be greatly missed."

Julian Birley, chairman of the North Norfolk Railway, said: "It is the end of an era. A great man who will forever be credited as one of this country’s greatest pioneers of railway preservation. And in so doing brought pleasure to hundreds of thousands of people."
