= Terence Cuneo =

British artist (1907–1996)

Terence Cuneo CVO OBE RGI FGRA
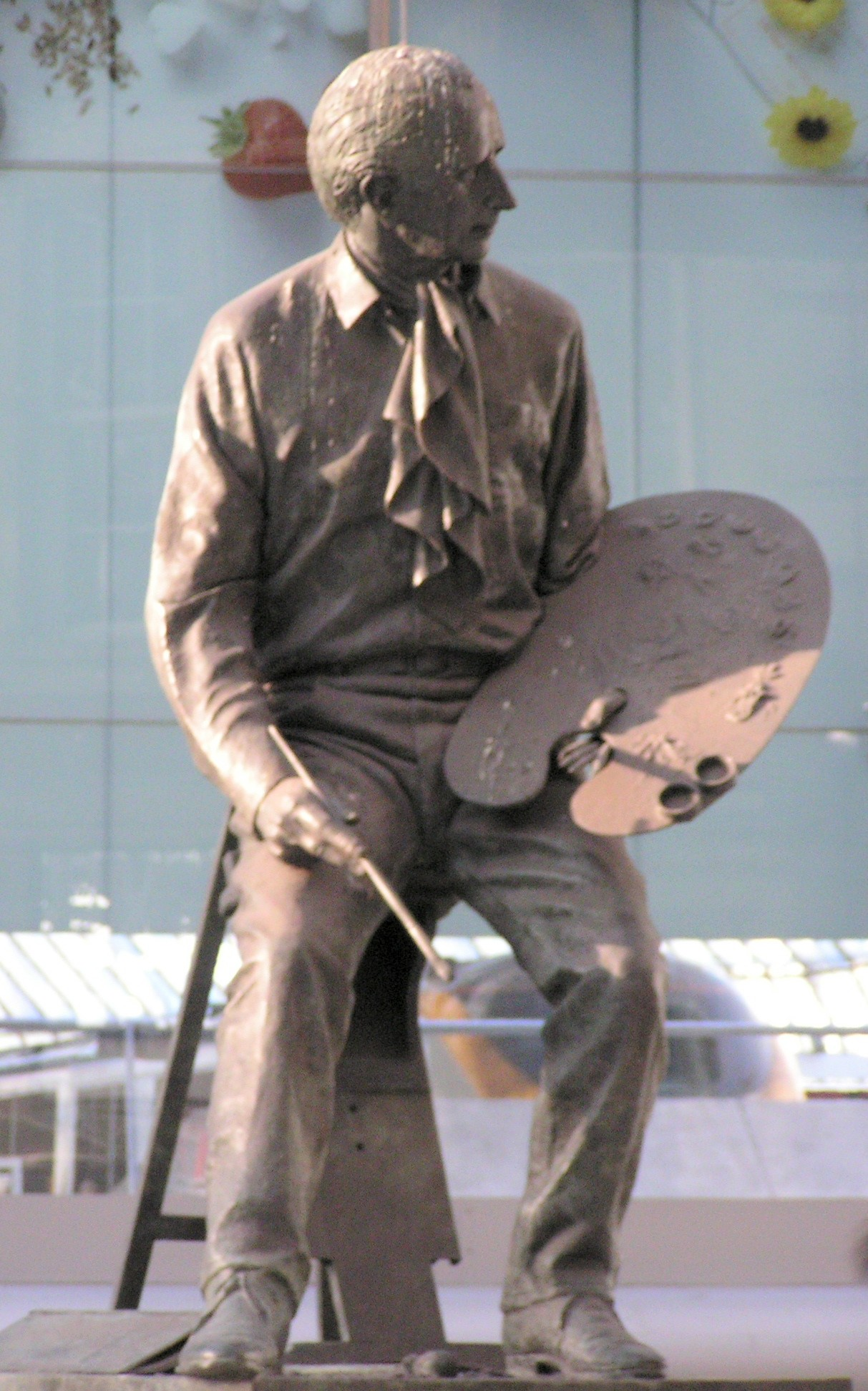
- Statue of Terence Cuneo by Philip Jackson
- Born: Terence Tenison Cuneo; 1 November 1907; London, England
- Died: 3 January 1996 (aged 88); Esher, England
- Education: Chelsea Polytechnic (1924–1927), Slade School of Art
- Known for: portraits, military, railways, landscape, illustration
- Notable work: Coronation of Queen Elizabeth II (1953); Concourse of Waterloo Station (1967)
- Parent(s): Cyrus Cincinato Cuneo; Nell Marion Tenison
- Patrons: Queen Elizabeth II; Field Marshal Bernard Montgomery

Terence Tenison Cuneo CVO OBE RGI FGRA (1 November 1907 – 3 January 1996) was a prolific English painter noted for his scenes of railways, horses and military actions. He was also the official artist for the Coronation of Queen Elizabeth II in 1953.

== Life and work ==
Terence Cuneo was born in London, the son of Cyrus Cincinato Cuneo (1879–1916) and Nell Marion Tenison (1881–1964), artists who met while studying with Whistler in Paris. Cyrus Cuneo's elder brother Rinaldo Cuneo was also an acclaimed painter in San Francisco, as was his youngest brother Egisto Cuneo. Terence Cuneo studied at Sutton Valence School in Kent, Chelsea Polytechnic and the Slade School of Art, before working as an illustrator for magazines, books and periodicals. In 1936 he started working in oils, continuing with his illustration work. During World War II he served as a sapper in the Royal Engineers but also completed a small number of commissions for the War Artists' Advisory Committee, providing illustrations of tank and aircraft factories. He served and became good friends with fellow artist Cyril Parfitt. Also during the War, Cuneo was commissioned by the Foreign Office to produce anti-Nazi drawings and cartoons and an exhibition of his war works was held at the Palaquin Fine Arts gallery in 1942.

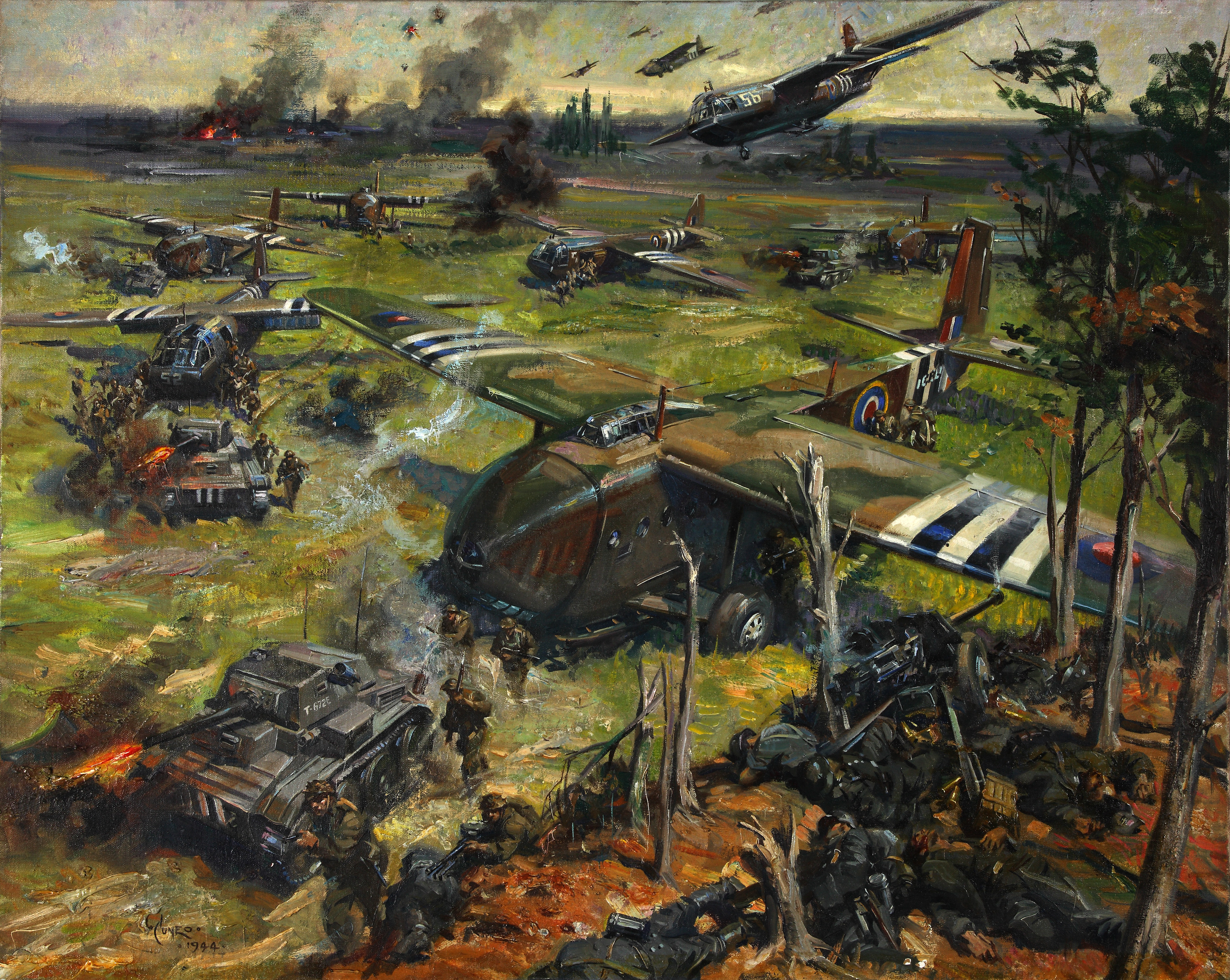
Cuneo's depiction of a Second World War invasion scene

After the war, Cuneo was commissioned to produce a series of works illustrating railways, bridges and locomotives. A significant point in his career was his appointment as official artist for the Coronation of Elizabeth II, which brought his name before the public worldwide. He received more commissions from industry, which included depicting manufacturing, mineral extraction and road building, including the M1. He was most famous for his paintings of engineering subjects, particularly locomotives and the railway as a whole. But in fact Cuneo painted over a wide range, from big game in Africa to landscapes. Further success was achieved in his regimental commissions, battle scenes and incidents as well as portraits (including Queen Elizabeth II and Field Marshal Montgomery).

From 1954 his works included a small mouse, sometimes lifelike, sometimes cartoonish. These became his trademark after 1956. They can be difficult to detect, and many people enjoy scouring his paintings to find one. Even some of his portraits of the famous contain a mouse.

His work has been used in a variety of ways, from book jackets and model railway catalogues to posters and jigsaws and even Royal Mail postage stamps. His paintings have appeared on both Great Britain and Isle of Man stamps. His work can also be found in many museums, officers' messes, and galleries, including Guildhall Art Gallery, Newarke Houses Museum, Lloyd's of London and the Royal Institution.

Cuneo was appointed an Officer of the Order of the British Empire (OBE) in the 1987 Birthday Honours and was appointed a Commander of the Royal Victorian Order (CVO) in the 1994 Birthday Honours. A 1.5 times life size bronze memorial statue of Cuneo, by Philip Jackson, stood in the main concourse at Waterloo station in London for many years, but has now been relocated to Brompton Barracks, Chatham. It was commissioned by the Terence Cuneo Memorial Trust (established March 2002) to create a permanent memorial to the artist, together with an annual prize at the Slade School of Art, given by the Trust. In tribute to Cuneo's trademark, the statue includes a mouse peering from under a book by the artist's feet, and another carved into the statue's plinth near the ground. The official handover of the statue and its dowry to the Institution of Royal Engineers took place on 12 July 2017 with Carole Cuneo (representing the Statue Memorial Trust), Colonel Nigel Montagu (representing the Institution of Royal Engineers) and Chris Wheeler (Chairman of the Cuneo Society) each giving short speeches.

A major exhibition of his life's work, forming part of the Hull City of Culture celebrations took place in the Brynmor Jones Gallery, University of Hull in 2017. Curated by the Science Museum Group’s Director Ian Blatchford and National Railway Museum Assistant Director and Head Curator Andrew McLean, the exhibition took a fresh look at Cuneo through his unique portrayal of power.

Terence Cuneo was cremated at the Randalls Park Crematorium, Leatherhead, Surrey, but no record has yet been entered in their Book of Remembrance.

A memorial plaque was installed on one of the houses built on the site of his home and studio 201 Ember Lane, East Molesey.

== See also ==
- List of works by Terence Cuneo

== Bibliography ==
- Westerman, John F. C & Cuneo, T (illustrator). Menace From The Air (Oxford University Press, 1938).
- Cuneo, T. The railway painting of Terence Cuneo (New Cavendish Books, 1984).
- Guild of Railway Artists (foreword by T. Cuneo). To The Seaside (David Charles (London), 1990).
- Chakra, Narisa. Terence Cuneo: Railway Painter of the Century (New Cavendish Books, 1990).
