= Malcolm Root =

British artist

Malcolm Root FGRA (born 1950) is a British artist who concentrates on classic transport subjects.

== Bibliography ==
- Malcolm Root's Transport Paintings Halsgrove (2002) ISBN 978-1-84114-221-0
- Malcolm Root's Railway Paintings
- Malcolm Root's: A Pageant of Transport
- The Railway Paintings of Malcolm Root
