= Paul Cuneo =

Australian rugby league footballer

Personal information
- Full name: Paul Cuneo
- Born: 2 July 1938; North Sydney, New South Wales, Australia
- Died: 7 January 2014 (aged 75); Sydney, New South Wales, Australia

Playing information
- Position: Centre, Prop, Second-row
Club
Years	Team	Pld	T	G	FG	P
1957–62	North Sydney	77	21	0	0	63
1963–69	Newtown	42	2	0	0	6
	Total	119	23	0	0	69
Representative
Years	Team	Pld	T	G	FG	P
1961	NSW City	1	0	0	0	0

Paul Cuneo (1938–2014) was an Australian rugby league footballer who played in the 1950s and 1960s for Newtown and North Sydney Bears in the NSWRL competition.

== Playing career ==
Cuneo began his first grade career for North Sydney in 1957. In 1961, Cuneo was selected to represent NSW City against NSW Country. Cuneo spent a total of 6 seasons at Norths before switching to Newtown in 1963. Cuneo played his one and only finals game for Newtown in 1966 against Manly which ended in a 10-9 loss. Cuneo retired at the end of 1969 after 119 first grade games. He then went on to coach the Newtown reserve grade side in the following years. He died on 7 January 2014.
