= Philip D. Hawkins =

British painter

Philip Dennis Hawkins FGRA is a British railway painter and photographer.

He was born in Birmingham, and became a railway illustrator. He was a founder of the Guild of Railway Artists and elected a Fellow in 1998.

== Bibliography ==
- Tracks on Canvas (1998) ISBN 0-86093-538-8
- Steam on Canvas (2005) ISBN 978-0-86093-592-6
