= Guild of Railway Artists =

British art guild

The Guild of Railway Artists (GRA) is a British-based art guild whose members are painters of railway subjects.

The Guild was formed in 1979 by artists including Terence Cuneo, David Shepherd, Philip Hawkins and Alan Fearnley. The idea grew out of a 1977 railway art exhibition held in Leamington Spa.

Membership can be applied for by submitting examples of one's work. "Friends" of the Guild are supporters of the guild who are not necessarily accomplished railway artists themselves. The Patrons of the Guild are Sir William McAlpine, 6th Baronet and Pete Waterman.

The Guild has approximately 150 members and exhibitions are held annually.

The Guild organises exhibitions of its members work around the UK, including Annual Exhibitions at the National Railway Museum at Shildon, County Durham.

== Fellowship ==
Fellowship is conferred by the governing council. There have only been five fellows (who are entitled to use the post-nominals FGRA)

- John Austin
- Terence Cuneo (died 1996)
- Philip D. Hawkins (elected 1998)
- Malcolm Root
- David Shepherd
