= Cyrus Cuneo =

American painter and illustrator who settled in London

Cyrus Cincinato Cuneo
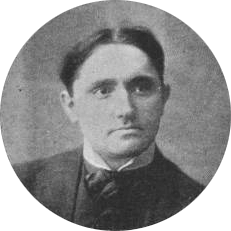
- Cuneo in 1909
- Born: 18 June 1879; San Francisco, California, U.S.
- Died: 23 July 1916 (aged 37); London, England
- Other name: Generally known as Ciro
- Occupations: Painter and illustrator
- Years active: 1896–1916
- Notable work: Murals for the Canadian Pacific Railway
- Spouse: Nellie Tenison (m. 1903)
- Children: 2 (including Terence Cuneo)
- Relatives: Rinaldo Cuneo (brother)

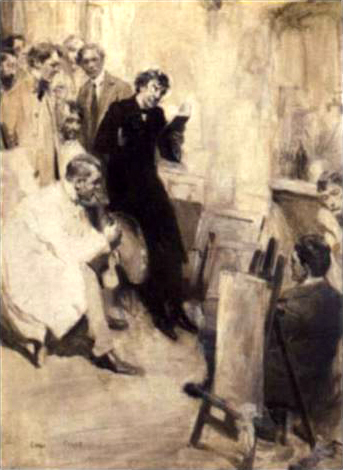
James Abbot McNeill Whistler in his studio by Cyrus Cuneo. Pencil and monochrome wash drawing, 1906. (Note: Whistler is reading from The Gentle Art of Making Enemies in Académie Carmen, surrounded by art students. Illustration for Whistler's Academy of Painting : Some Parisian Recollections by Cuneo in Pall Mall Magazine)

Cyrus Cincinato Cuneo ROI (18 June 1879 – 23 July 1916), known as Ciro, was an American-born English visual artist, best known for painting.

== Early life ==
He was born into an Italian American family of artists and musicians. His parents were Giovanni (John) and Annie Cuneo; his brothers Rinaldo (1877–1939) and Egisto (1890–1972), and his son Terence Cuneo (1907–1996) also became artists.

The family lived on Telegraph Hill in San Francisco's Italian American neighborhood of North Beach. (Note: Their house was destroyed in the 1906 San Francisco earthquake and fire, and the family lost almost everything. However, by then Cuneo was successfully established in London and he was able to assist them, as well as paying for the whole family to take a holiday in Italy.) Cuneo's first published drawings appeared in an Italian newspaper when he was 16, and he spent the next three years he worked for the San Francisco Press. (Note: Again, there is a date conflict, as he should only have been 17 in 1896 when he went to Paris.)

Cuneo trained as a boxer, becoming the fly-weight champion at the Olympic Club in San Francisco (Note: Peppin and Micklethwait state that he became the flyweight boxing champion of San Francisco at age 19, but he had left for Paris in 1996, when he was 17. He may have returned to San Francisco to compete, but that would have been expensive.) and his prize money, together with earnings from spare-time jobs, and the sale of sketches and to travel to Paris to learn painting. The Times reported that he left San Francisco for Paris with £40 in his pocket.

== Education ==
Cuneo began his studies in art while still living in San Francisco, at the Mark Hopkins Art Institute. When he travelled to Paris in 1896, he joined the Colarossi's studio and trained under Whistler eventually becoming his massier or head student. Cuneo set up an afternoon sketching school with Edith Œnone Somerville (1858–1949). Teaching sketching and boxing helped Cuneo to support himself in Paris. The Times said that Cuneo had a fine physique and was a notable athlete, and as a boxer was famous not only on the Pacific slope, but also in Paris and in London.

Cuneo was living at 9, Rue Campagne, Première Montparnasse, Paris, in 1900 when he first exhibited at the Royal Academy. He showed two works in that year, both of them illustrations from King Lear by Shakespeare. Cunoe also exhibited at other venues. (Note: He exhibited 16 works at the Royal Institute of Oil Painters, 13 at the Royal Academy, nine at the Royal Hibernian Academy, six at the Walker Art Gallery, and five at the Glasgow Institute of Fine Art.)

== Move to London ==
While Greenwall states that Cuneo moved to London in 1902, Kirkpatrick notes that the 1901 census found him lodging with his future wife's parents in London (while she was still in Paris).

Cuneo married fellow artist Nellie Tenison (28 August 1869 – 23 May 1953) in London on 20 October 1903.

== Honors and awards ==
Cuneo was elected ROI in 1908. Cuneo was a successful artist in terms of earning a living. During World War One he painted war subjects in London and the sale by auction of one of his paintings paid for two motor ambulances for the front.

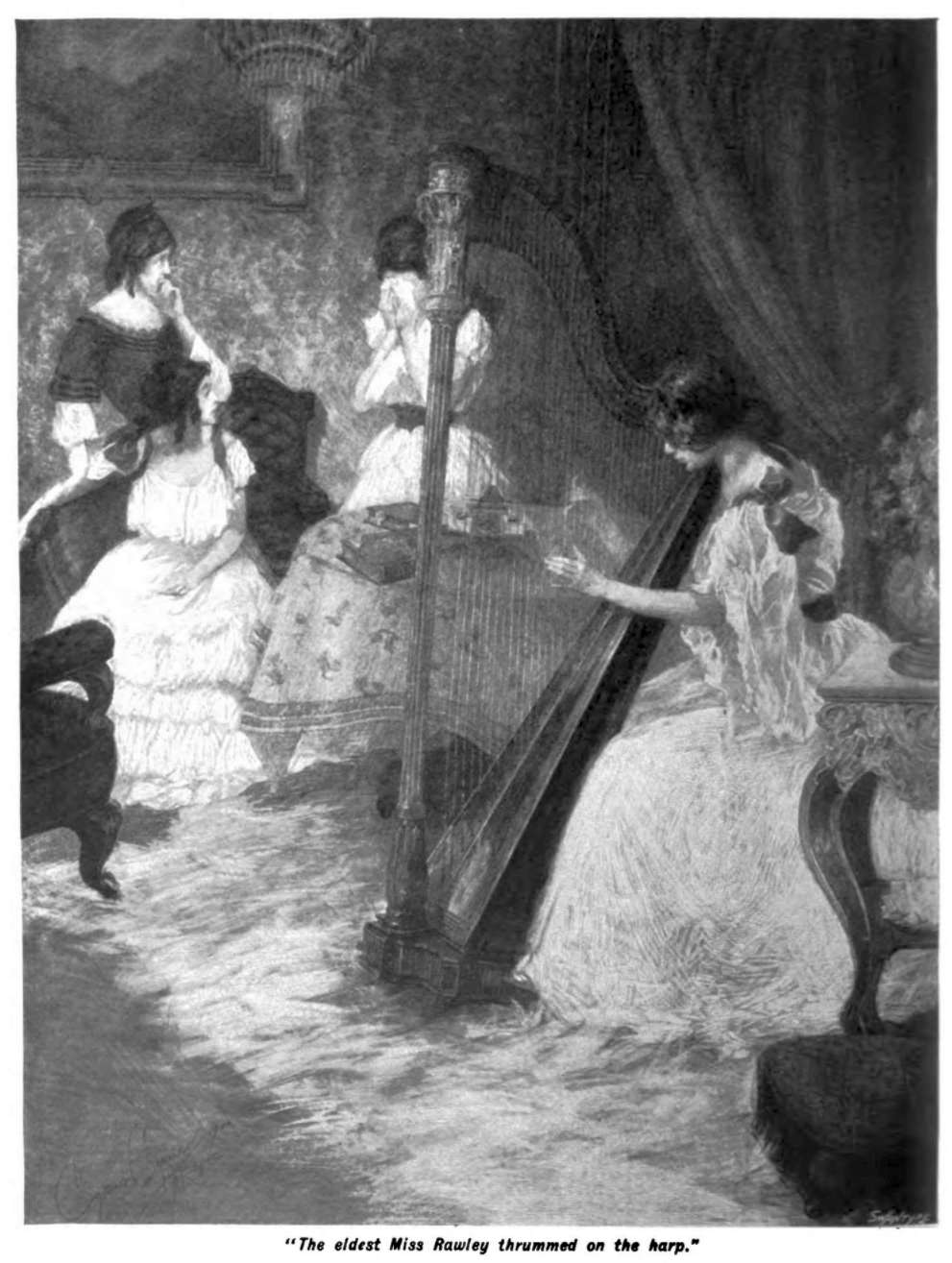
Thorpe considered this illustration by Cuneo for a story in The Pall Mall Magazine to be a beauty.

Cuneo's illustration work was unusual in that he often painted in oils on board. Peppin and Micklethwait state that Cuneo worked with considerable panache in crayon or in black and white oil on board painted without preliminary pencil drafts. Thorpe considered one of his illustrations for The Pall Mall Magazine in 1900 to be a beauty and reproduced it in his survey of English illustration in the 1890s. Cuneo was selected by Percy Bradshaw for inclusion in his 1918 The Art of the Illustrator which included a portfolio for each of twenty illustrators. (Note: Of course, Cuneo was dead by the time that Bradshaw published, but some of the illustrations by other artists were dated 1915, so Bradshaw had been working on the collection for some time. The portfolio contained a brief biography of Cuneo, an illustration of him in his studio and an explanation of his method of working accompanied by an illustration typical of his work and the stages of its production. Cuneo's black and white illustration shows a horseman dismounting at a campsite while a man and a woman are cooking.)

== Death ==
Cuneo got blood poisoning after being accidentally scratched with a hat-pin at a dance. He died on 23 July 1916. His estate was valued at £13,798 17s. 6d. (equivalent to £1,037,764 in 2025) and his wife Nellie acted as his executor.
