= Gateway School =

Coordinates: 40.772297°N 73.987661°W

The Gateway School

Location
- 211 West 61st Street; New York, New York; United States

Information
- School type: Independent
- Established: 1965
- Employees: 80+
- Grades: K-8
- Age range: 5-14
- Enrollment: 180
- Slogan: Success Starts Here
- Accreditation: New York State Association of Independent Schools
- Website: http://www.gatewayschool.org

The Gateway School is an independent school on the Upper West Side of Manhattan serving children ages 5–14 with learning disabilities. It currently enrolls approximately 180 students.

Gateway students typically have difficulty in mainstream classrooms due to a language-based learning disability (dyslexia, expressive and receptive language delays, reading and writing disorders); attention deficit hyperactivity disorder; and/or executive function disorder.

== History ==
The Gateway School of New York was established in 1965 by Elizabeth Freidus and Claire Flom. Freidus was an educator at Columbia University Teachers College; Claire Flom was the mother of Gateway's first student. The initial class consisted of five students in a space rented from Madison Avenue Presbyterian Church on Manhattan's Upper East Side. The school remained in this location for 36 years.

In 2001, Gateway moved into a converted brownstone at 236 Second Avenue near Union Square. With the decision to add a Middle School to the existing Lower School, Gateway began searching for an even larger building, and it debuted its current home on West 61st Street, near Lincoln Center, in 2008.

In the 2024-2025 school year, Gateway celebrated its 60th anniversary.

== Awards ==
2009 - LEED Silver certification from the U.S. Green Building Council

2010 - National Center for Learning Disabilities’ Founders Award for exceptional service to children and families

2011 - Head of School Robert Cunningham was named one of the top Game Changers in Education by The Huffington Post

== Leadership ==
Elizabeth Freidus, Founding Director (1965–1978)

Davida Sherwood, Ph.D., Director (1978-2004)

Robert Cunningham, Head of School (2004-2013)

Carolyn Salzman, Head of School (2013–2020)

Laurie Gruhn, Head Of School (2020–2025)

Sherri Helvie, Interim Head of School (2025–present)

== Professional Organizations ==
Gateway is a member of the following professional organizations: Children and Adults with Attention-Deficit/Hyperactivity Disorder (CHADD), Council for Exceptional Children (CEC), Education Records Bureau (ERB), Independent Schools Admissions Association of Greater New York (ISAAGNY), International Dyslexia Association (IDA), Learning Disabilities Association (LDA), National Association of Independent Schools (NAIS), National Business Officers Association (NBOA), New York Guild of Independent Schools, New York State Association of Independent Schools (NYSAIS), and Parents League of New York

Head of School Carolyn Salzman authored an article titled "Choosing a Special Education School" for the 2015 issue of The Parents League Review.

In the fall of 2015, artwork from Gateway students was on display at the Child Mind Institute in New York City, as part of the Beginning with the Self exhibit.
