= Geraldine Mockler =

British children's author

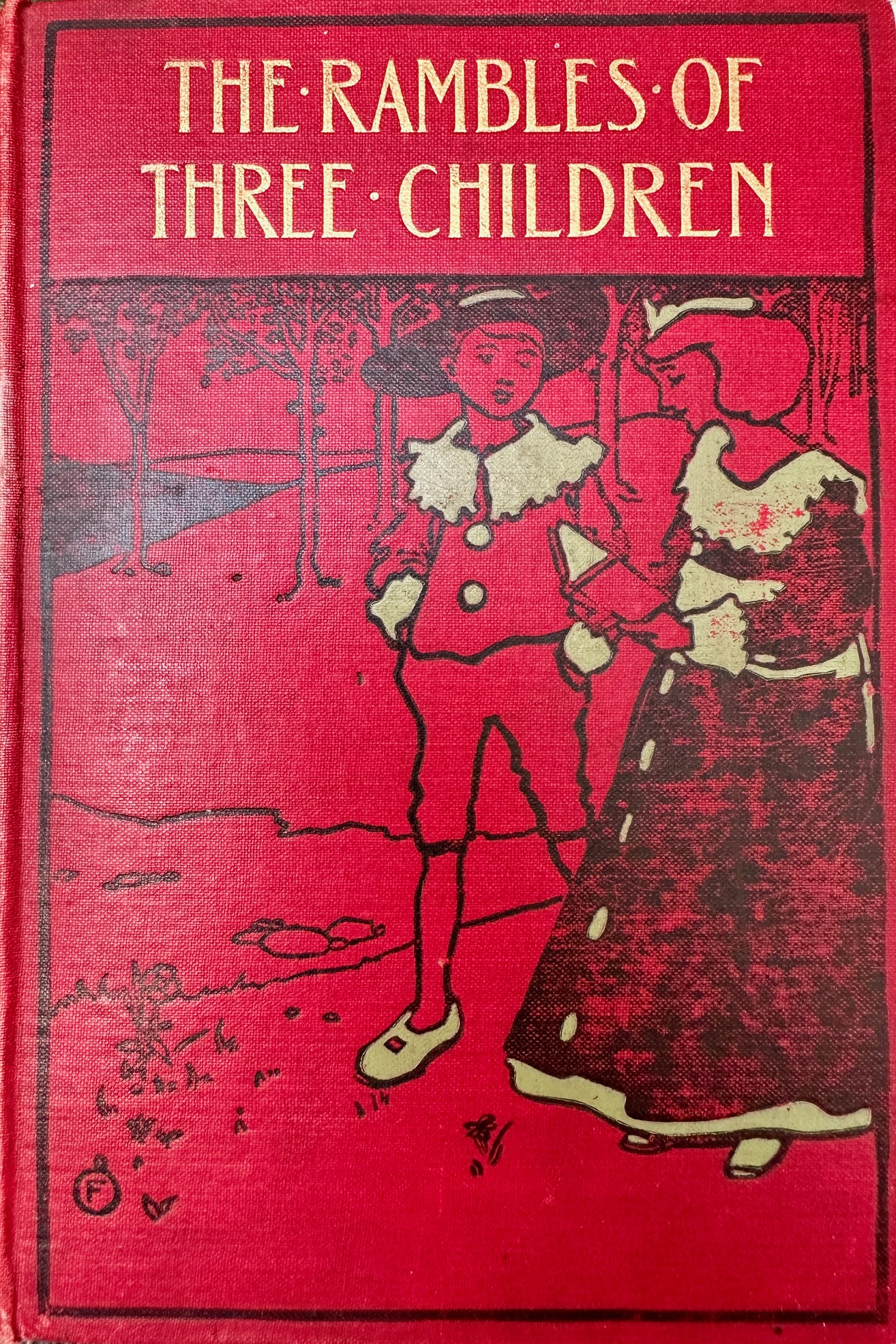
- Book cover of The Rambles of Three Children by Geraldine Mockler, published 1906
- Born: Geraldine Mary Celia Mockler; 01 Oct 1868 Newton Abbot, England
- Died: 23 Apr 1967 (aged 98) Brighton, England
- Occupation: Children's author
- Notable works: The Girls of St. Bede's

Geraldine Mary Celia Mockler (1 October 1868 - 23 April 1967) was an English prolific author of children's books.

== Biography ==
Mockler was born in Teignmouth, Devon to father Irish army officer William Elliot Mockler and mother Clara Isabella (née Birdwood). In her early twenties, Mockler began writing young adult fiction, making her debut with Nell, Edie and Toby and their Adventures in 1891.

Mockler never married. She died in Brighton.

== Select works ==
- Nell, Edie and Toby and their Adventures (1891)
- The Girls of St. Bede's, illustrated by P. B. Hickling. (Jarrold & Sons, 1898)
- A Long Chase: The Story of a Seaside Adventure (1896)
- Edie's Adventure (1902)
- The Rambles of Three Children, frontis. illustration by T. H. Wilson (Blackie and Son Limited, c. 1906)
- The Rebellion of Margaret (1910)
- Cousin Betty: A Tale for Girls (1913)
- Proud Miss Sydney
- The Four Miss Whittingtons
- The Travels of Fuzz and Buzz
- Spring Fairies and Sea Fairies, illustrated by N. Benson
- Her New Kitten (Blackie and Son Limited)
- The Hollow Tree: The Story of a Winter Adventure (Blackie and Son Limited)
- Tony Maxwell's Pluck (Blackie and Son Limited)
- Jake's Birthday Present, illustrated by R. H. Brock (Blackie and Son Limited)
- The Little Girl from Next Door, illustrated by L. Leslie (Blackie and Son Limited)
- The Best of Intentions: The Story of a Brother and Sister
- A New Friend: A Story for Boys and Girls
- Our Friend Jim (Blackie and Son Limited)
- A Boy Cousin (Blackie and Son Limited)
- Bunny and Furry (Sunny series, Blackie and Son Limited)
- The Heiress of Aylewood
- Sir Wilfrid's Grandson (Blackie and Son)
