= Michael Cuneo =

American electrical engineer

Michael Cuneo is an electrical engineer at the Sandia National Laboratories in Albuquerque, New Mexico.

Cuneo was named a Fellow of the Institute of Electrical and Electronics Engineers (IEEE) in 2014 for his contributions to inertial confinement fusion with magnetically-driven implosions and electrode cleaning.
