= Progreso, Uruguay =

Progreso
- City & Municipality
- Location in Uruguay
- Coordinates: 34°39′54″S 56°13′10″W
- Country: Uruguay
- Department: Canelones
- Founded: 1871
- Elevation: 70 m (230 ft)

Population (2011 Census)
  - Total: 16,244
- Time zone: UTC -3
- Postal code: 90300
- Dial plan: +598 2 (+7 digits)

Progreso is a city in the Canelones Department of southern Uruguay. It gives the name to the municipality to which it belongs.

== Geography ==
The city is located on the old Route 5 (which runs parallel to the railway track Montevideo - Santa Lucia), about 29 kilometres (18 mi) from the centre of Montevideo. It belongs to the wider metropolitan area of Montevideo. The Arroyo Colorado flows through the jurisdiction.

== History ==
The city was founded on 15 November 1871 under the name of Progreso, the Spanish term for «Progress». However, prior to 1871, the place where the current city is located received the name of Puntas del Canelón Chico or Arroyo del Gigante.

The name Progreso is due to the arrival of the railway in 1871, which was introduced into Uruguay by the English.

The railway system enabled the place to expand itself beyond its original borders and to achieve, at the same time, some sort of economic prosperity. The railway system also resulted in the establishment of some English families near the industrial area of the city. Today the wooded avenue that leads to the railway station is known as the Avenida de los Ingleses, meaning «Avenue of the Englishmen». The neighborhood where this station is located is known as the Villa Inglesa, «English Village».

Its status was elevated to "Pueblo" (village) category on 1 July 1953 by the Act of Ley Nº 11.968, and then on 11 December 1981 to "Ciudad" (city) by the Act of Ley Nº 15.228.

Present-day Progreso, despite its name, ranks high in Uruguay as far as the unemployment rate is concerned.

== Population ==
According to the 2011 census, Progreso had a population of 16,244. In 2010, the Intendencia de Canelones had estimated a population of 19,578 for the municipality during the elections.

Location map of the Municipality of Progreso

Year	Population
1963	7,010
1975	9,612
1985	11,244
1996	14,471
2004	15,775
2011	16,244

Source: Instituto Nacional de Estadística de Uruguay

== Places of worship ==
- St. Anthony Mary Claret Parish Church (Roman Catholic, Claretians)
- St. Mary of the Visitation Monastery (Roman Catholic, Visitandines)

== Government ==
The city mayor as of July 2015 is Javier "Petru" Petrucelli.
