= Rinaldo Cuneo =

American painter (1877–1939)

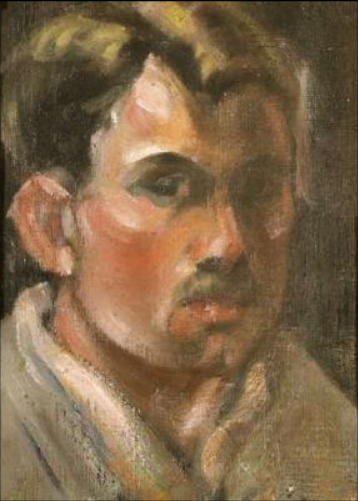
- Self-Portrait
- Born: July 2, 1877; San Francisco, California, U.S.
- Died: December 27, 1939 (aged 62); San Francisco, California, U.S.
- Other name: Richard Cuneo
- Education: Mark Hopkins Institute of Art (Arthur Mathews), Académie Colarossi, James McNeill Whistler
- Known for: Painting, murals
- Movement: Impressionism, Tonalism, Modernism
- Relatives: Cyrus Cuneo (brother)

Rinaldo Cuneo (July 2, 1877 – December 27, 1939), was an American artist known for his landscape paintings and murals. He was dubbed "the Painter of San Francisco".

== Early life and education ==
Rinaldo Cuneo was born in San Francisco on July 2, 1877, (Note: Hughes gives Cuneo's birth date as July 2, 1877 and his death date as December 29, 1939. Numerous online sources list the birth/death years as 1877/1939. This would make him 62 at the time of his death. But the December 28, 1939 Los Angeles Times article announcing that he had died on December 27, 1939 gave his age at the time of death as 59.) part of an Italian American family of artists and musicians. Rinaldo was the second of Giovanni (John) Cuneo and his wife Annie's seven children. Rinaldo and his brothers Cyrus (1879–1916) and Egisto (1890–1972) all became artists. Their sisters Erminia, Clorinda, Evelina, and Clelia were interested in music and opera. The family lived on Telegraph Hill in San Francisco's Italian American neighborhood of North Beach. As an adult, Rinaldo's home and studio, on a cliff with unobstructed views of the bay, was just a block from his childhood home.

Cuneo enlisted in the Navy at age twenty, during the Spanish–American War, and served for three years aboard the Oregon as a gunner. He then worked at the family business, a steamship ticket agency, and began his art studies, taking night classes at the Mark Hopkins Institute of Art under Arthur Frank Mathews, Arthur Putnam, and Gottardo Piazzoni. Among his classmates were Ralph Stackpole and Maynard Dixon. His art education continued in London, and at Académie Colarossi in Paris (1911–1913). He studied under James Abbott McNeill Whistler.

== Art ==
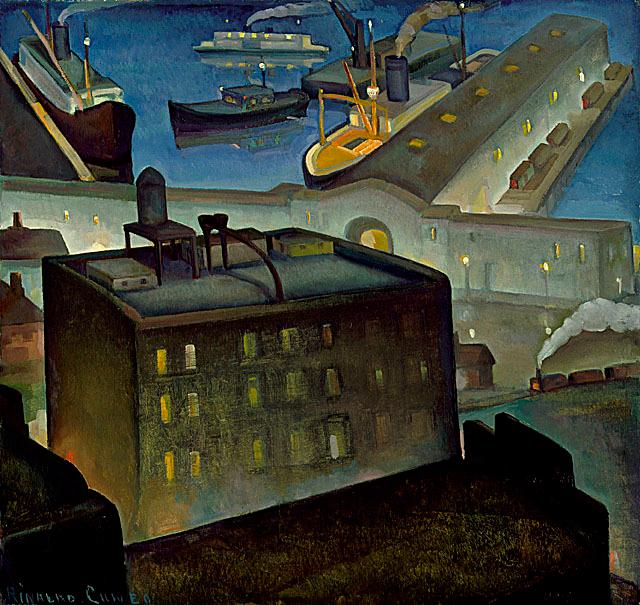
The Embarcadero at Night, circa 1927-1928, Los Angeles County Museum of Art

Perhaps best known for his oil paintings depicting landscapes of the San Francisco Bay Area and for his murals, Cuneo also painted cityscapes, marine scenes, and still lifes. His first exhibition, in 1913, was in San Francisco at the Helgesen Gallery, and his work was also shown at the 1915 Panama–Pacific International Exposition and in virtually every subsequent major Bay Area art exhibit until his death. A reviewer wrote that Cuneo's paintings "leave a mellow glow in one's heart. They portray not merely places, but mood and atmosphere."

His early color palette reflected that of Tonalism, with earthy, dark, neutral hues. One of his teachers, Whistler, was a leading Tonalist. Cuneo later adopted the lighter pastel palette associated with the Impressionists. Still later in his career, he used a palette which "vibrated with low-keyed, intense colors and radiance." His painting style also evolved throughout his career, and he integrated innovations which he came across into his own style, including aspects of Tonalism, Impressionism, and Modernism.

From 1916 to 1917 Cuneo worked for a tugboat service while living in San Anselmo, painting maritime scenes in his spare time. He taught at the California School of Fine Arts during the summer sessions of 1920, 1925, 1935, and 1936.

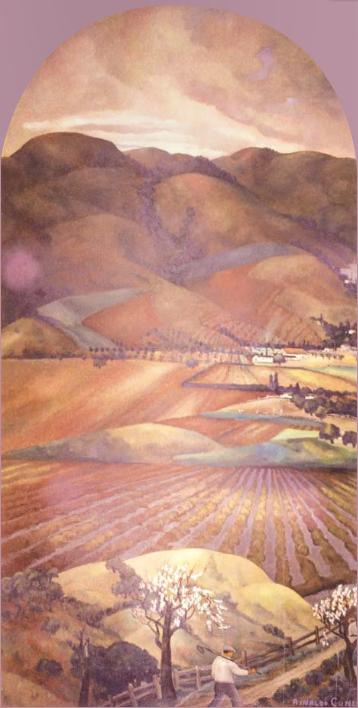
Bay Area Hills, 1934, 108 x 54 inches

For his many exceptional paintings of the Bay Area, Cuneo was known as The Painter of San Francisco. Arthur Millier of the Los Angeles Times wrote that Cuneo's landscapes "breathe the essential strength and poetry of his region." Another critic noted that "they are the very soul and essence of California materialized in line and color." In addition to his California landscapes, in 1928 he also painted scenes of the Arizona desert. Cuneo said that "a landscape should embrace volume, simplicity, unity, a good sense of color values, rhythm of line, and above all, light."

In 1934 Cuneo received a commission from the Public Works of Art Project to paint two lunette murals of Bay Area Hills in the foyer of Coit Tower. A number of Cuneo's paintings were featured in the 1935 inaugural exhibition of the San Francisco Museum of Art. One of them, California Hills, was honored with the Museum's Purchase Prize award.

After a brief illness, Cuneo died in San Francisco on December 27, 1939.

Although he had been a popular artist with many well-received exhibits throughout his life, Cuneo had found himself unable to successfully market his paintings due to the economic conditions created by the Great Depression. This led to feelings that he had failed. San Francisco Chronicle columnist Herb Caen wrote that the artist's wife found "more than one hundred hitherto unseen Cuneo paintings, hidden in his two studios – in corners, in trunks, under books (some even hanging turned to the wall by the artist)." Many of these paintings were subsequently displayed in solo exhibitions, in 1940 at the San Francisco Museum of Art, in 1949 at the de Young Museum, and in 1961 at San Francisco's Gallery of Fine Arts.

A critic wrote in 1991 that Cuneo "was a Cezannesque purist worth remembering".

== Exhibitions and collections ==
Cuneo's numerous solo exhibitions included ones in London, Paris, Rome, New York, and Los Angeles. His work was featured in exhibits at the Helgesen Gallery (San Francisco) (1913), Metropolitan Museum of Art (1933), Museum of Modern Art (New York), San Francisco Art Association (1916–34), Golden Gate International Exposition (1939), California Palace of the Legion of Honor, and the de Young Museum.

A 2009 exhibit at Museo ItaloAmericano, Cuneo: A Family of Early California Artists, presented a retrospective of the work of Rinaldo, Cyrus and Egisto Cuneo. It was the first exhibit to display the work of the three brothers together.

His work is also in many museum collections, including Oakland Museum of California, San Francisco Museum of Modern Art, Sierra Nevada Museum (Reno), de Young Museum, Laguna Art Museum, Los Angeles County Museum of Art, The Huntington, and Museo ItaloAmericano.

== Gallery ==
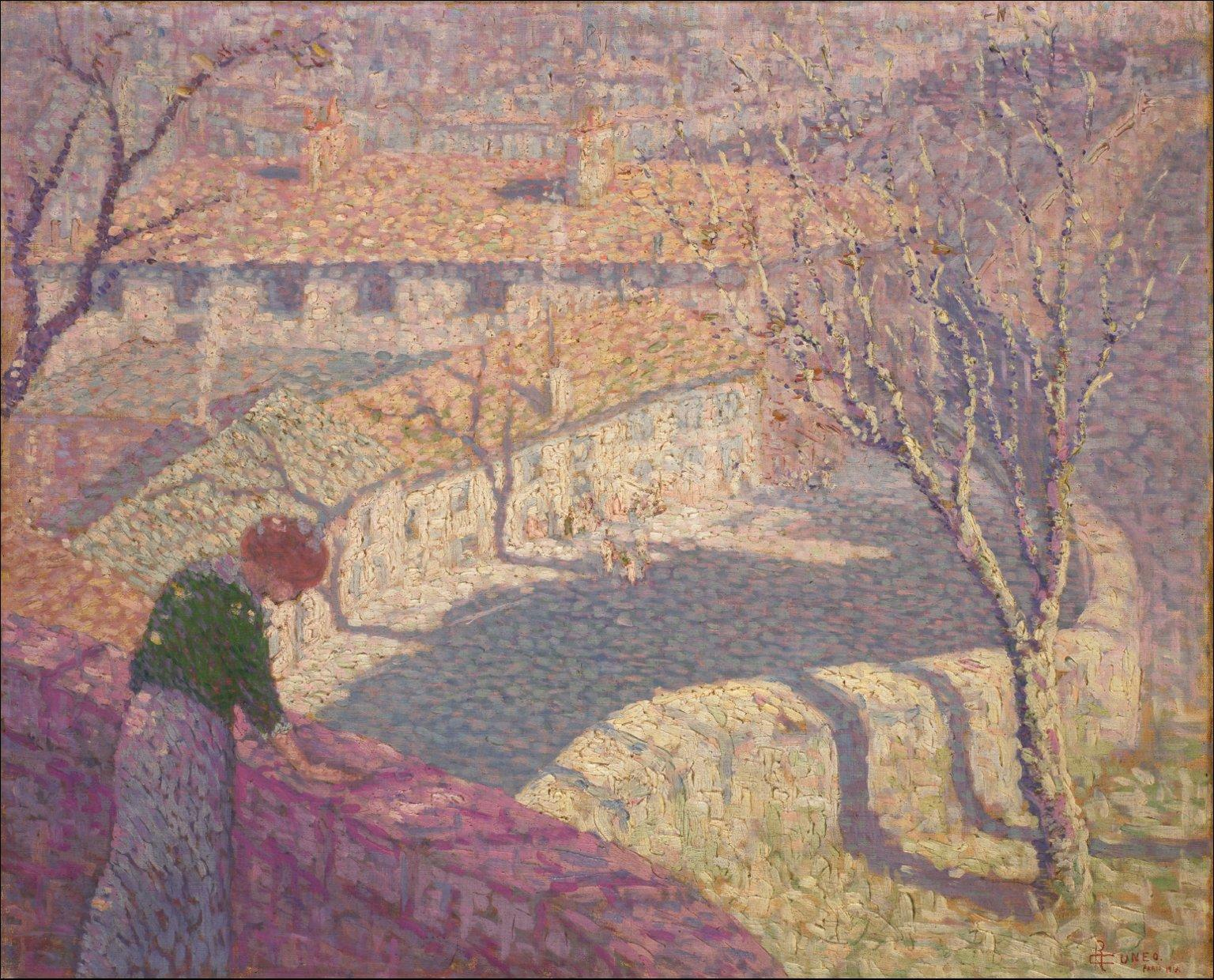
Belle View, France, c. 1913

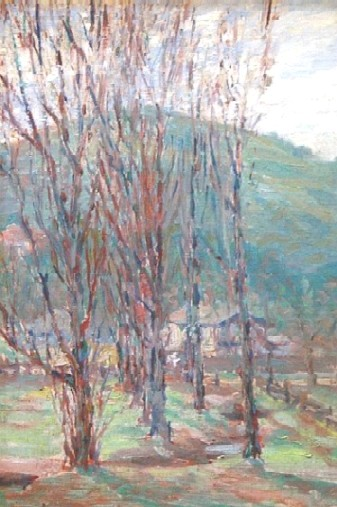
Near San Anselmo, c. 1916

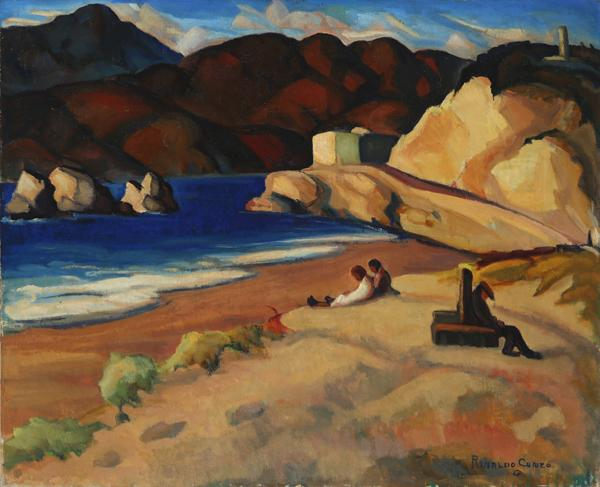
Untitled (Baker Beach, near San Francisco), c. 1928, Laguna Art Museum

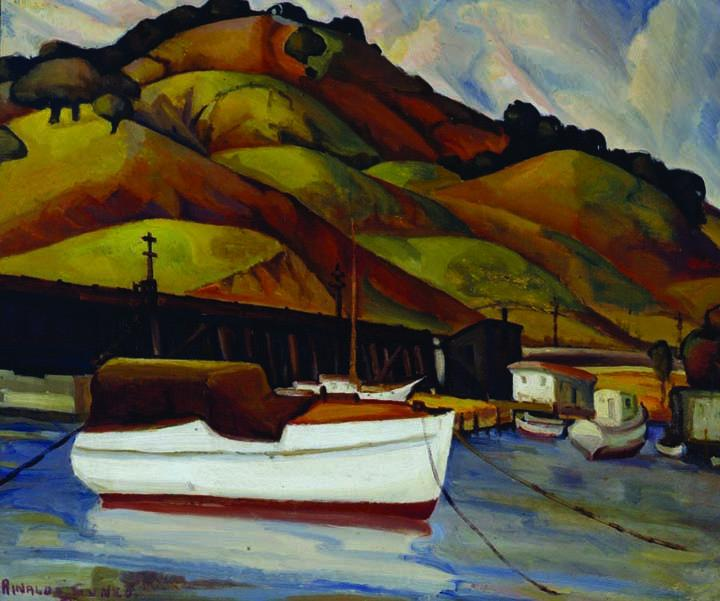
California Hills With White Boat, 1930, Museo ItaloAmericano

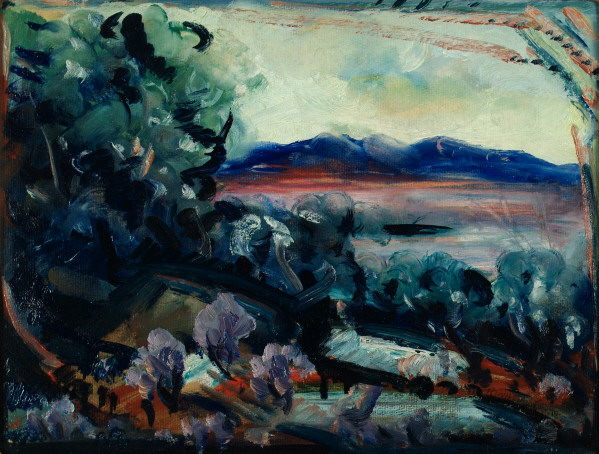
Northern California, c. 1935, The Huntington Library

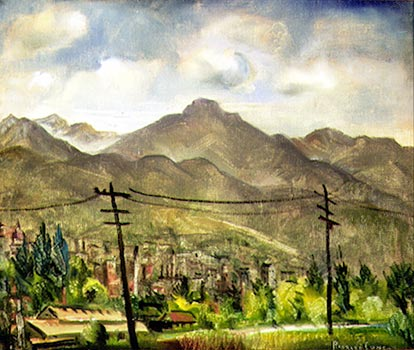
Town and Hills, Utah, c. 1937

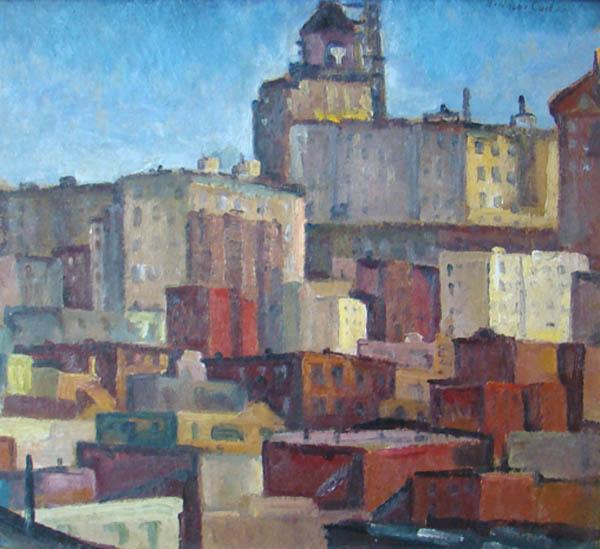
Cityscape

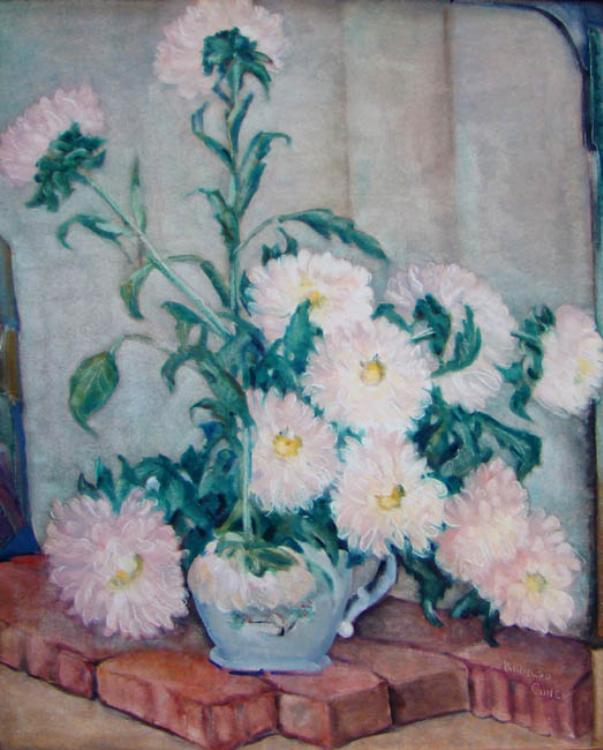
Still Life with Dahlias

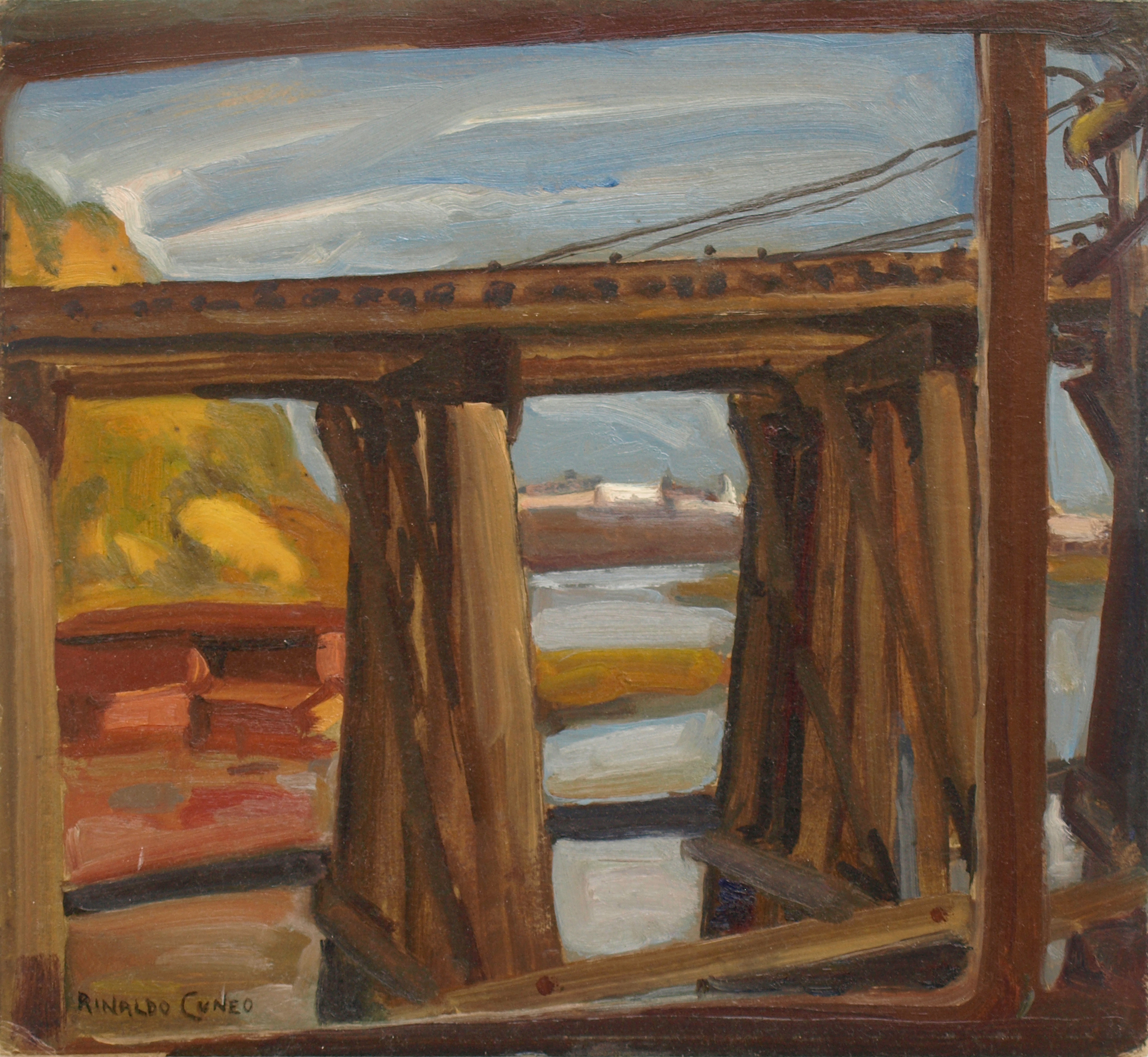
Larkspur Landing Trestle, 1930s

== Works ==
=== Selected paintings ===
- 1913 – Belle View, France, c.1913, oil on canvas
- 1916 – Near San Anselmo, c. 1916
- 1920 – Urban Park, c. 1920, oil on canvas, Museo ItaloAmericano, San Francisco, California
- 1920 – Three Panel Decorative Screen: Lake, Hills, Trees and Nude, c. 1920
- 1927 – The Embarcadero at Night, c. 1927–1928, oil on plywood, Los Angeles County Museum of Art, Los Angeles, California
- 1927 – San Francisco from Telegraph Hill, c. 1927, oil on paper, Shasta State Historic Park, Shasta County, California
- 1927 – Site of Aquatic Park, San Francisco, c. 1927, oil on paper, Shasta State Historic Park, Shasta County, California
- 1928 – Old Fisherman's Warf, Monterey, oil on canvas, Shasta State Historic Park, Shasta County, California
- 1928 – Untitled (Baker Beach, near San Francisco), c. 1928, Laguna Art Museum, Laguna Beach, California
- 1930 – California Hills With White Boat, oil on canvas, Museo ItaloAmericano, San Francisco, California
- 1930s – Larkspur Landing Trestle c. 1930, 12 x 13, oil on board
- 1930 – Storm Mountains, c. 1930, oil on canvas
- 1930 – The Farm, c. 1930, oil on canvas
- 1935 – Northern California, c. 1935, Huntington Library, near Pasadena, California
- 1937 – Town and Hills, Utah, c. 1937, oil on canvas
- California Hills
- Cityscape
- San Anselmo, oil on canvas
- Self Portrait, oil on canvas board
- Still Life with Dahlias
- Untitled (Piedmont Hills), oil on canvas, Farhat Art Museum, Beirut, Lebanon

=== Murals ===
- 1934 – Bay Area Hills, Coit Tower, San Francisco, California
