= José Cuneo =

Argentine comics artist, painter and illustrator

- Born: 1965 (age 60–61) Buenos Aires, Argentina
- Areas: Comics artist, Painter, Illustrator

José Cuneo (born 1965) is an Argentine comics artist, painter and illustrator.

Born in Buenos Aires, Cuneo's father was a doctor and his mother a teacher. He moved to France in 1986. He has drawn for Pif Gadget and Gai pied, and has also created public service comics to raise awareness of the threat of AIDS. Like his predecessor Copi, he is openly gay and uses his work to candidly address issues of gay life.

Cuneo's work is characterized by stylized figures with eyes facing in all directions. As a painter, he has exhibited his work in Paris and Amsterdam.

== Bibliography ==
- Y'a plus d'hommes, Free boy hors-série n° 1.
- Vieille, moche et méchante, Albin Michel, 1990.
- Le Mariage de Roberto, éditions gaies et lesbiennes, 1999.
- Avec Christophe Marcq, Le Petit Madame H illustré, éditions gaies et bi, 2002.
