= The Criminologists' Club =

Short story by E.W. Hornung

- Short story by E. W. Hornung
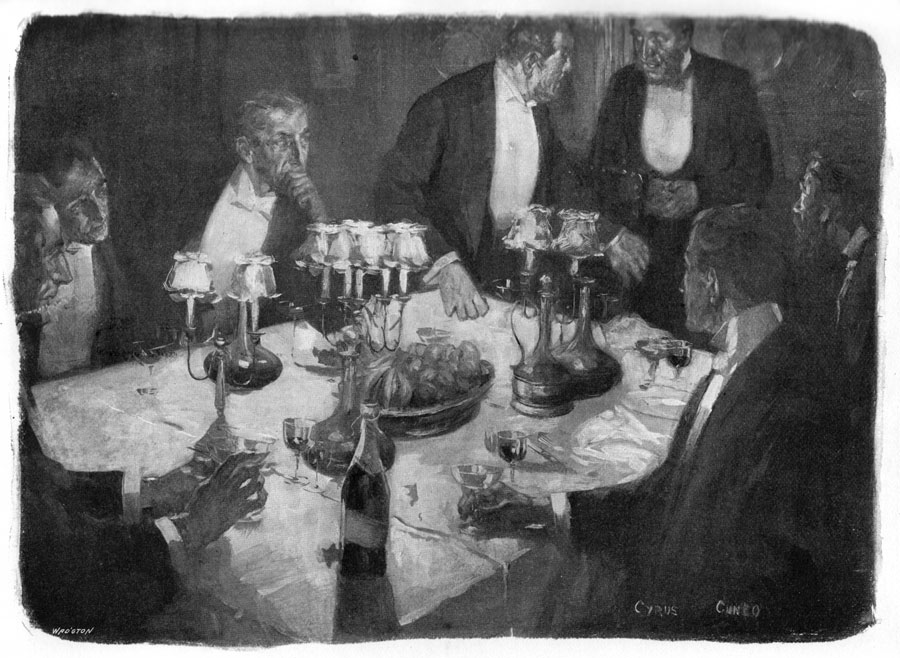
- 1905 Pall Mall illustration by Cyrus Cuneo
- Country: United Kingdom
- Language: English
- Genre: Crime fiction

Publication
- Publisher: Collier's Weekly
- Media type: Print (Magazine)
- Publication date: March 1905

Chronology
- Series: A. J. Raffles
The Rest Cure	The Field of Philippi

"The Criminologists' Club" is a short story by E. W. Hornung, and features the gentleman thief A. J. Raffles, and his companion and biographer, Bunny Manders. The story was published in March 1905 by Collier's Weekly in New York, and in April 1905 by Pall Mall Magazine in London. It was also included as the fourth story in the collection A Thief in the Night, published by Chatto & Windus in London, and Charles Scribner's Sons in New York, both in 1905.

== Plot ==
Raffles, who has lately been visiting Bunny very often, tells Bunny about a small society of four crime experts, who call themselves the Criminologists. They take an interest in a number of crimes, especially the series of London society robberies. Raffles and Bunny are invited to join them dinner at the house of club president Lord Thornaby, ostensibly to discuss the potential of crime in sport (such as gambling and throwing matches), as Raffles is a well-known cricketer. However, on the night of the dinner, Bunny overhears the whispers of two members, and discovers that the club in fact suspect Raffles to be a gentleman thief.

In the house, Raffles is too occupied in conversation for Bunny to warn him. At dinner, Raffles and the four men, including a Wild West novelist and a barrister who has sentenced criminals to death, amiably discuss convicted murderers and burglars. Eventually, Lord Thornaby mentions their belief that the same thief committed the burglary on Bond Street and the robbery of Lady Melrose's necklace. Raffles glibly replies that he has connections to the victims of both, and is impressed by the unknown criminal. The group jokes that the criminal might be in the house, and Lord Thornaby, anxious, sends his butler to check the house. The butler returns, and stutters that the bedroom door and dressing-room door are, disturbingly, locked from inside.

All the men rush upstairs to investigate. The doors are jammed with wedges screwed with gimlets. Lord Thornaby asks his butler to fetch an emergency rope-ladder, and the novelist bravely climbs down and opens the dressing-room door. The room has been picked and ransacked. Lord Thornaby's parliamentary robes are gone.

The men leave the scene to the police, and go to the house's library. The police find a broken clock, which signals that the time of the robbery was during dinner. Raffles is cleanly absolved of all suspicion.

You may figure me as gazing on Raffles all this time in mute and rapt amazement. But I had long been past that pitch. If he had told me now that he had broken into the Bank of England, or the Tower, I should not have disbelieved him for a moment.

— Bunny listens to Raffles recount the burglary

Afterwards, Bunny takes Raffles to his rooms to tell him the truth of the Criminologists' suspicions, only to learn that Raffles had known about them along. In fact, it was Raffles who had committed the burglary of Lord Thornaby's house, the previous night, using a rope-ladder and telescope walking-stick. He had also sneaked in quickly a second time, before dinner, to fake disorder and the broken clock. He had been visiting Bunny's rooms often to use them to spy on the house and prepare his plan. Later, Raffles returns the parliamentary robes to Lord Thornaby anonymously.

== Adaptations ==
=== Television ===
When the Raffles stories were adapted for British television in 1977, this story was merged with that of "A Jubilee Present" to create a single episode The Gold Cup.

=== Radio ===
BBC Radio adapted the story into the sixth episode of its Raffles radio drama, "The Criminologists Club", which first aired on 8 June 1988. The drama features Jeremy Clyde as Raffles and Michael Cochrane as Bunny. The episode follows most of the plot of the original story, with some changes:

- In the drama, Raffles gives Bunny a telescope, though secretly for the purpose of using it to spy on Lord Thornaby's house. In the original story, Raffles uses Bunny's racecourse binoculars instead.
- Inspector Mackenzie is present at Lord Thornaby's dinner in the drama. It is Mackenzie who notices the broken clock.
- In the drama, the robbery of Bunny's bank is also ascribed by the criminologists to the infamous society burglar, in addition to the incidents on Bond Street and at Milchester.
- In the drama, Raffles pretends to get drunk, while actually tossing his champagne into a potted plant. In the original story, Raffles merely limits his intake of champagne.
- Rather than return the parliamentary robes as in the original story, in the drama Raffles replaces Bunny's old curtains with the robes.
