= Daughter of the Snows =

Daughter of the snows may refer to:

- A Daughter of the Snows, a 1902 novel by Jack London
- The Daughter of the Snows, an 1879 ballet by Marius Petipa and Ludwig Minkus
