= A Jubilee Present =

- Short story by E. W. Hornung
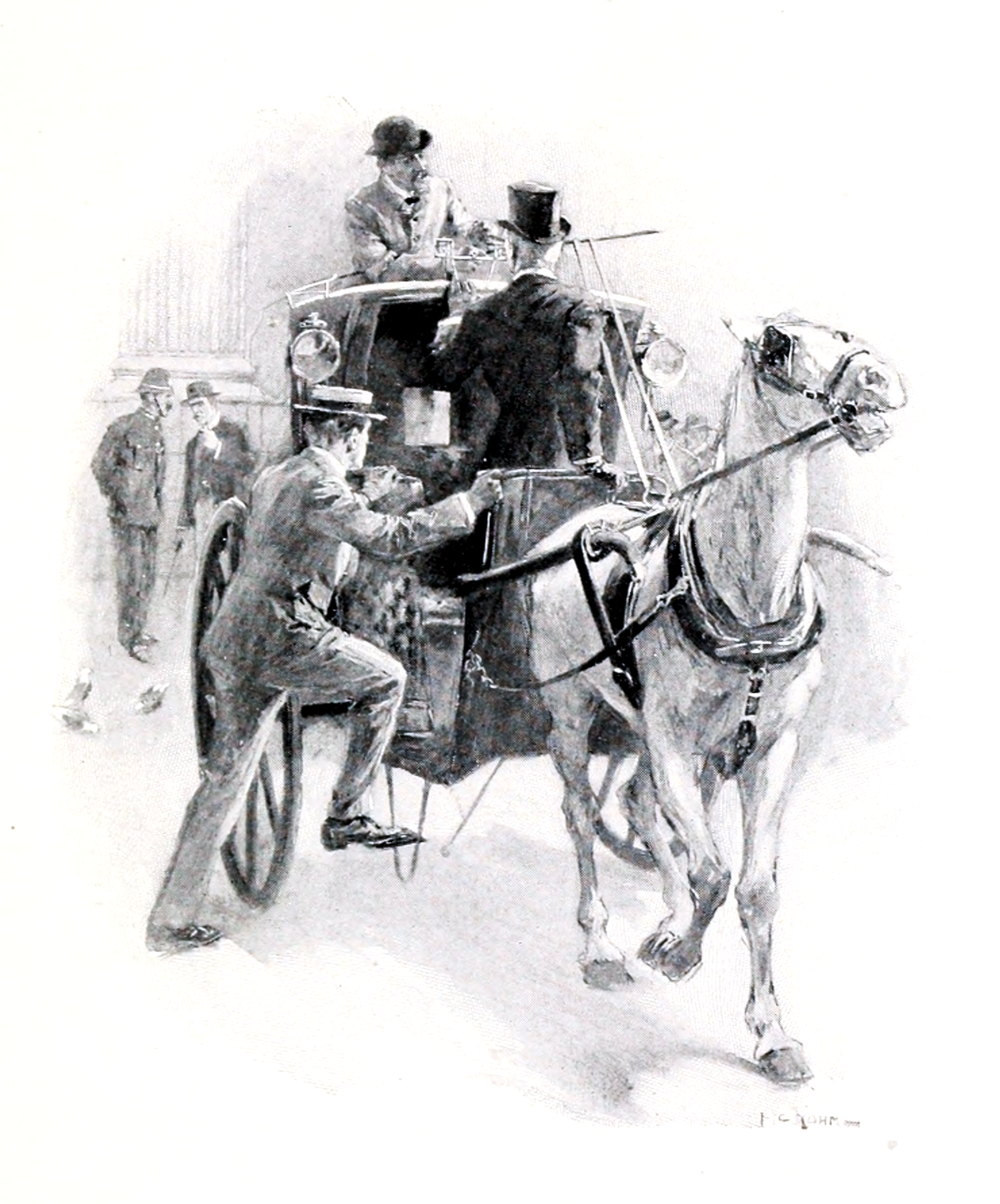
- Bunny and Raffles, 1906 illustration by F. C. Yohn
- Country: United Kingdom
- Language: English
- Genre: Crime fiction

Publication
- Publisher: Charles Scribner's Sons
- Media type: Print (Magazine)
- Publication date: February 1901

Chronology
- Series: A. J. Raffles
No Sinecure	The Fate of Faustina

"A Jubilee Present" is a short story by E. W. Hornung, and features the gentleman thief A. J. Raffles, and his companion and biographer, Bunny Manders. The story was first published in Scribner's Magazine in February 1901. The story was also included as the second story in the collection The Black Mask, published by Grant Richards in London, and Charles Scribner's Sons in New York, both in 1901.

== Plot ==
The Room of Gold, in the British Museum, is probably well enough known to the inquiring alien and the travelled American. A true Londoner, however, I myself had never heard of it until Raffles casually proposed a raid.

— Raffles decides to steal from the British Museum

While walking idly on the roof of their Earl's Court home at midnight with Bunny, Raffles announces they will visit the British Museum to investigate how they can steal its golden trinkets. Bunny is reluctant to steal trinkets until Raffles tells him that there is a gold cup among the trinkets worth several thousand pounds, and then Bunny becomes even more excited than Raffles.

The next morning, after a visit to Kew Gardens to maintain the appearance that Raffles is an invalid in need of fresh air, Raffles and Bunny visit the Room of Gold in the British Museum. Bunny is disappointed by the cup's thinness, while Raffles admires its beauty. While Raffles discusses stealing the gold cup, a constable overhears and approaches. After suavely assuaging the constable's fears, Raffles observes that the three of them are alone; the room's attendant, who is supposed to be present, is down the corridor speaking to the attendant.

To Bunny's surprise, Raffles knocks out the constable with his fists before the constable can blow his whistle. At Raffles's bidding, Bunny ensures that the two attendants do not hear. Bunny returns to see Raffles's pockets empty, yet Raffles walks with Bunny slowly out of the museum. They take a roundabout way home, using several cabs. At home, Bunny is infuriated that Raffles lied to him about only visiting the museum for the sake of investigating, but Raffles answers that there was no lie, and his intentions only changed because of the rare opportunity of the room's attendant being absent. Raffles has hidden the gold cup underneath his top hat.

Raffles grows infatuated with the cup, and for some time he refuses to part with it. Eventually, however, Raffles sends Bunny to buy a large box of Huntley & Palmers biscuits as part of a new scheme involving the cup. Raffles packs the gold cup into the box, then disguises himself to pass the porter on his way to dispose of the box. After returning, Raffles reveals to Bunny that he has been to the post office and sent the cup to Queen Victoria as an anonymous present to mark her Diamond Jubilee.

== Adaptations ==
=== Television ===
The story was adapted for television as the Raffles episode "The Gold Cup", which first aired on 18 March 1977. Anthony Valentine portrayed A. J. Raffles and Christopher Strauli portrayed Bunny Manders. In the television adaptation, a subplot is inserted about a society of criminologists, taken from "The Criminologists' Club", another Raffles short story. Part of "A Jubilee Present" was adapted into the episode "The First Step".

=== Radio ===
BBC Radio adapted the story into the second half of the thirteenth episode of its Raffles radio drama, "No Sinecure", which first aired on 30 July 1992. The drama features Jeremy Clyde as Raffles and Michael Cochrane as Bunny. The plot faithfully follows that of the original story, with only minimal changes:

- In the original story, Bunny is initially eager to steal the gold cup. In the episode, he is reluctant from the start.
- In the episode, the visit to Kew Gardens is for fun only, rather than serving as a blind.
- In the episode, Raffles and Bunny have to wait for Dr. Theobald to go on his honeymoon before visiting the British museum. In the original story, Dr. Theobald is already away.
- In the original story, Raffles disguises himself to pass the porter on his way to send the gold cup. In the episode, Bunny distracts the porter.
