= No Sinecure =

Short story by E. W. Hornung, published in 1901

- Short story by E. W. Hornung
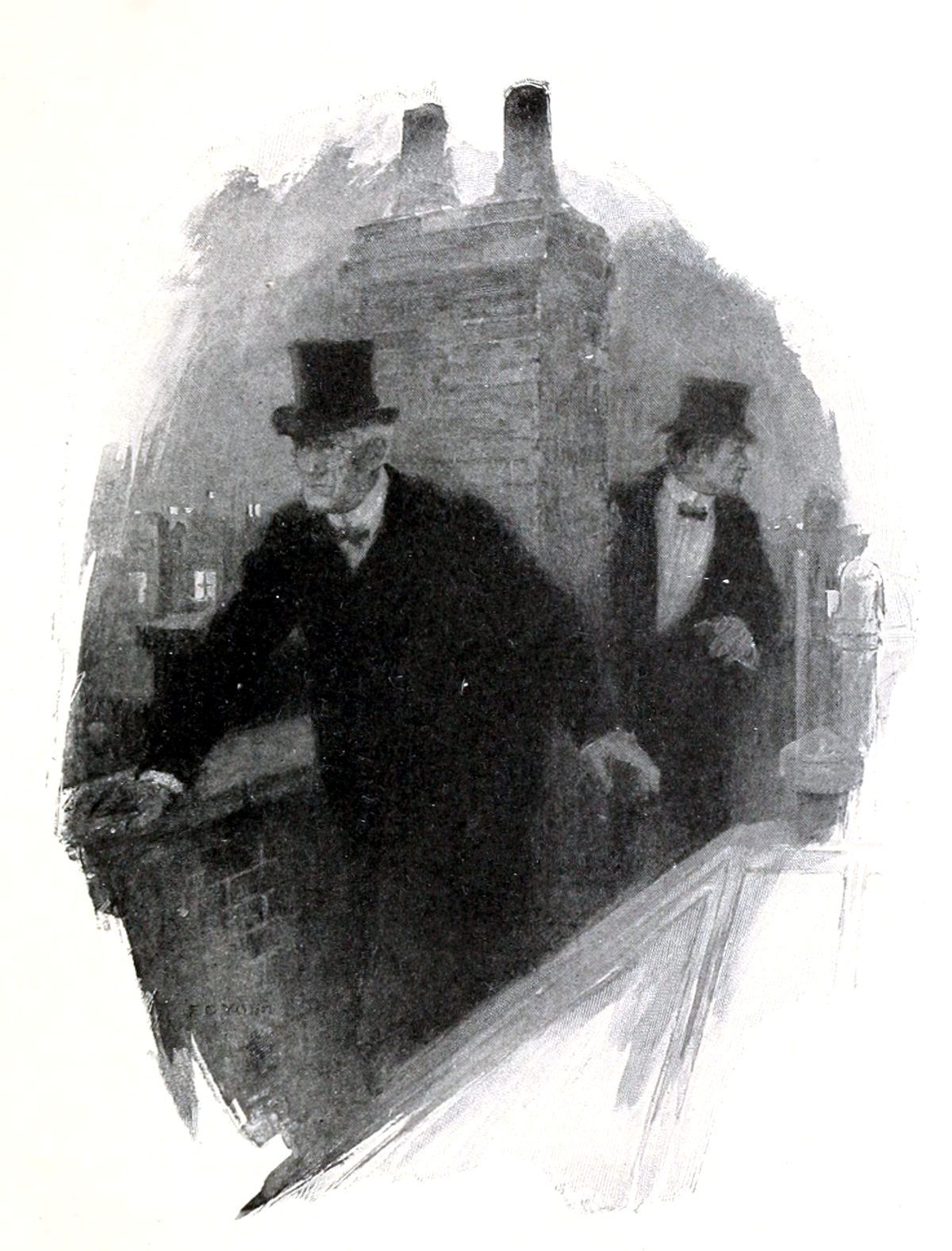
- Raffles and Bunny, 1906 illustration by F. C. Yohn
- Country: United Kingdom
- Language: English
- Genre: Crime fiction

Publication
- Publisher: Charles Scribner's Sons
- Media type: Print (Magazine)
- Publication date: January 1901

Chronology
- Series: A. J. Raffles
The Gift of the Emperor	A Jubilee Present

"No Sinecure" is a short story by E. W. Hornung, and features the gentleman thief A. J. Raffles, and his companion and biographer, Bunny Manders. The story was first published in Scribner's Magazine in January 1901. The story was also included as the first story in the collection The Black Mask, published by Grant Richards in London, and Charles Scribner's Sons in New York, both in 1901.

== Plot ==
=== Part one ===
It is May 1897. Bunny, now an ex-convict and struggling journalist, receives a telegram from an estranged relative telling him to read an advertisement in the Daily Mail, which says that a man named Mr. Maturin is seeking a male nurse of good education. Bunny answers the advertisement at Maturin's flat, in Earl's Court. He encounters Maturin's doctor, Dr. Theobald, who scrutinizes Bunny and then takes him to Maturin's bedroom to meet the patient.

Bunny sees the ailing Maturin lying in bed. Maturin interviews Bunny. He orders Theobald to leave, then asks Bunny to fetch him his hidden cigarettes. As Maturin smokes, he complains that the cigarettes are not Sullivans; instantly, Bunny realizes that Maturin is his old friend, Raffles.

I cannot repeat what I said. I have no idea what I did. I only know—I only knew—that it was A. J. Raffles in the flesh!

— Bunny, amazed by Raffles's reveal

=== Part two ===
Raffles reveals that he is disguising himself as Maturin to maintain the belief that Raffles is dead. Theobald does not know Maturin's true identity. Upon returning to England from Italy, Raffles had written both the advertisement and Bunny's telegram in order to reunite with Bunny. Raffles declares they go to a restaurant that night to celebrate.

=== Part three ===
At night, they escape the building using an unwatched staircase from the roof. They ride to the restaurant. Raffles takes Bunny to a private room, and they feast. As they finish, a tradesman named Mr. Robinson arrives. Raffles chooses jewelry from him for Bunny's imaginary sister. Bunny, confused, plays along. In the end, Raffles is unable to pay for his chosen items. Instead, he seals them in a cigarette box and returns them to Robinson: Raffles will send Robinson the money later, after which Robinson will send Raffles the sealed box. Robinson, bewildered by the arrangement, nonetheless agrees.

Later, back at Earl's Court, Raffles reveals to Bunny that he kept the real box, after swapping it with a duplicate. He asks Bunny to sell off the jewelry.

== Background ==
The name Maturin may have been taken from Charles Maturin, writer of the novel Melmoth the Wanderer and great-uncle to Oscar Wilde. While in exile in France in 1897, Wilde went by the name "Sebastian Melmoth" in reference to the novel; this fact may have inspired Hornung to use the name "Maturin" for a Raffles living in social exile.

== Adaptations ==
BBC Radio adapted the story into part of the thirteenth episode of its Raffles radio drama, "No Sinecure", which first aired on 30 July 1992. The drama features Jeremy Clyde as Raffles and Michael Cochrane as Bunny. The first half of the drama closely follows the plot of the original story, with some minor changes:

- In this episode, Bunny decides that he cannot survive living honestly. In the original stories, he had already learned this lesson during the events of "The Gift of the Emperor".
- The original subplot wherein Raffles swindles a jeweler is entirely absent from the drama.
