= To Catch a Thief (short story) =

- Short story by E. W. Hornung
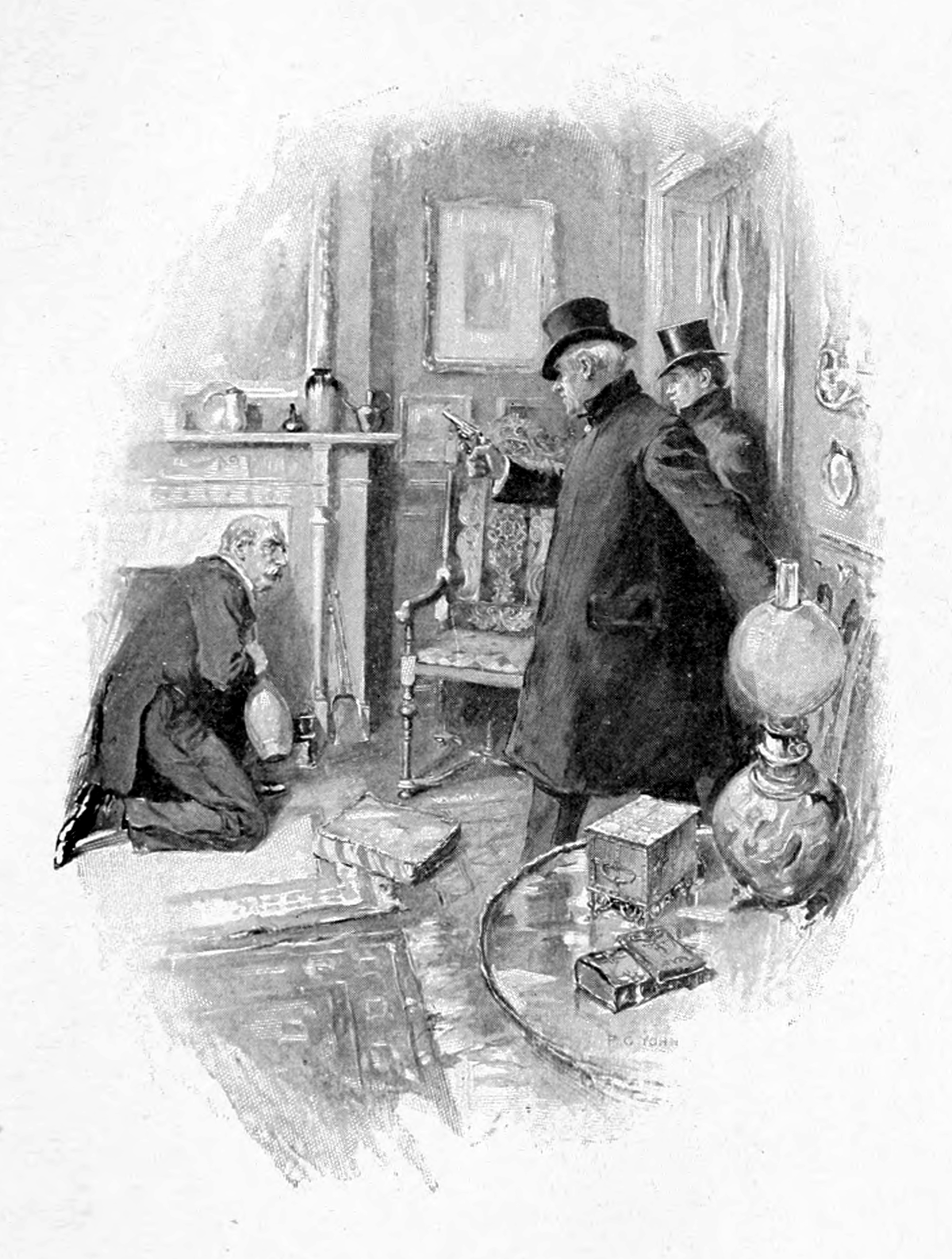
- Lord Ernest, Raffles, and Bunny, 1906 illustration by F. C. Yohn
- Country: United Kingdom
- Language: English
- Genre(s): Crime fiction

Publication
- Publisher: Charles Scribner's Sons
- Media type: Print (Magazine)
- Publication date: May 1901

Chronology
- Series: A. J. Raffles
The Last Laugh	An Old Flame

"To Catch a Thief" is a short story by E. W. Hornung, and features the gentleman thief A. J. Raffles, and his companion and biographer, Bunny Manders. The story was first published in Scribner's Magazine in May 1901. The story was also included as the fifth story in the collection The Black Mask, published by Grant Richards in London, and Charles Scribner's Sons in New York, both in 1901.

== Plot ==
=== Part one ===
"Society is in rings like a target, and we never were in the bull's-eye, however thick you may lay on the ink! I was asked for my cricket. I haven't forgotten it yet. But this fellow's one of themselves, with the right of entrée into the houses which we could only 'enter' in a professional sense."

— Raffles, comparing himself and Bunny to Lord Ernest

While dining at a restaurant, Raffles and Bunny discuss a recent series of unsolved robberies that have victimized London's wealthiest houses. Raffles suspects the burglar is really a society gentleman who steals while attending social functions. Raffles has used this suspicion, and the lists of names of social function's attendees printed in the Morning Post, to deduce the burglar's identity: Lord Ernest Belville, a relatively poor yet respected society man, and a well-known advocate for temperate drinking.

Raffles, in the disguise of a reporter, has interviewed Lord Ernest. Raffles deduced that Lord Ernest meant to steal diamonds from a lady shortly. That night, Raffles and Bunny will access Lord Ernest's flat and wait until Lord Ernest returns, then blackmail him into partnership.

=== Part two ===
At King John's Mansions, after waiting for Lord Ernest to leave, Raffles and Bunny gain admittance using Raffles's duplicate key made from a secret wax impression. They search his rooms and stumble upon two wooden clubs, whose weights are unequal. With Bunny's help, Raffles opens each with a gimlet, and finds Lord Ernest's stolen jewelry. They agree to run away with the spoils.

However, Lord Ernest suddenly returns home. Raffles, feigning to be a Scotland Yard detective, pretends to arrest Lord Ernest. Raffles then passes his bared revolver to Bunny, and leaves on the pretense of calling a cab. When they are alone, Lord Ernest overpowers Bunny, and knocks him out.

=== Part three ===
Bunny, now injured, wakes to see Raffles. Lord Ernest has evidently fled through the window. Raffles and Bunny leave with the jewelry in their pockets, and return to the roof of their home, where Bunny stays and waits for Raffles to fetch them drinks and chairs.

However, Lord Ernest appears from the darkness with a gun. He handcuffs Bunny to a bridge connecting two roofs. An unsuspecting Raffles returns, to be pinned by Lord Ernest's revolver. Lord Ernest reveals that he had secretly remained in his flat's bathroom, and had overheard them. Meanwhile, a storm begins to rain on them.

Raffles, remaining calm, proposes partnership, but Lord Ernest refuses to release Bunny. The rain puts out the light of Raffles's candle, and in the darkness Raffles uses flashes of lightning to jump to Bunny. Lord Ernest jumps after him. Raffles makes it, but Lord Ernest missteps, and falls to his death. Raffles slips Bunny free using soap and water, and brings him to their flat to nurse him overnight.

== Adaptations ==
=== Television ===
The story was adapted as the eighth episode of the Raffles television series, with Anthony Valentine as A. J. Raffles and Christopher Strauli as Bunny Manders. The episode, titled "To Catch a Thief", first aired on 15 April 1977.

=== Radio ===
BBC Radio adapted the story into the fourteenth episode of its Raffles radio drama, "To Catch a Thief", which first aired on 6 August 1992. The drama features Jeremy Clyde as Raffles and Michael Cochrane as Bunny. The plot of the episode closely follows that of the original story, with minor changes:

- The drama includes a new scene where Bunny must keep Dr. Theobald from entering while Raffles is away. A similar scene does, however, take place during the events of the unadapted short story "The Last Laugh".
- In the drama, Bunny also deduces the society burglar's identity. He adds that the deduction was, "Elementary, my dear Raffles."
- In the original story, Raffles and Bunny argue while in Lord Ernest's flat. They do not argue in the drama.
- in the drama, Dr. Theobald is away on travel for the night that Raffles and Bunny go to meet Lord Ernest.
- In the drama, Raffles steals the key to the handcuffs from Lord Ernest before the latter falls.
- In the drama, Inspector Mackenzie conducts a vain investigation into Lord Ernest's death. He even interviews Raffles, while the latter is in his disguise as the ailing old man, Mr. Maturin.
