= The Last Laugh (short story) =

- Short story by E. W. Hornung
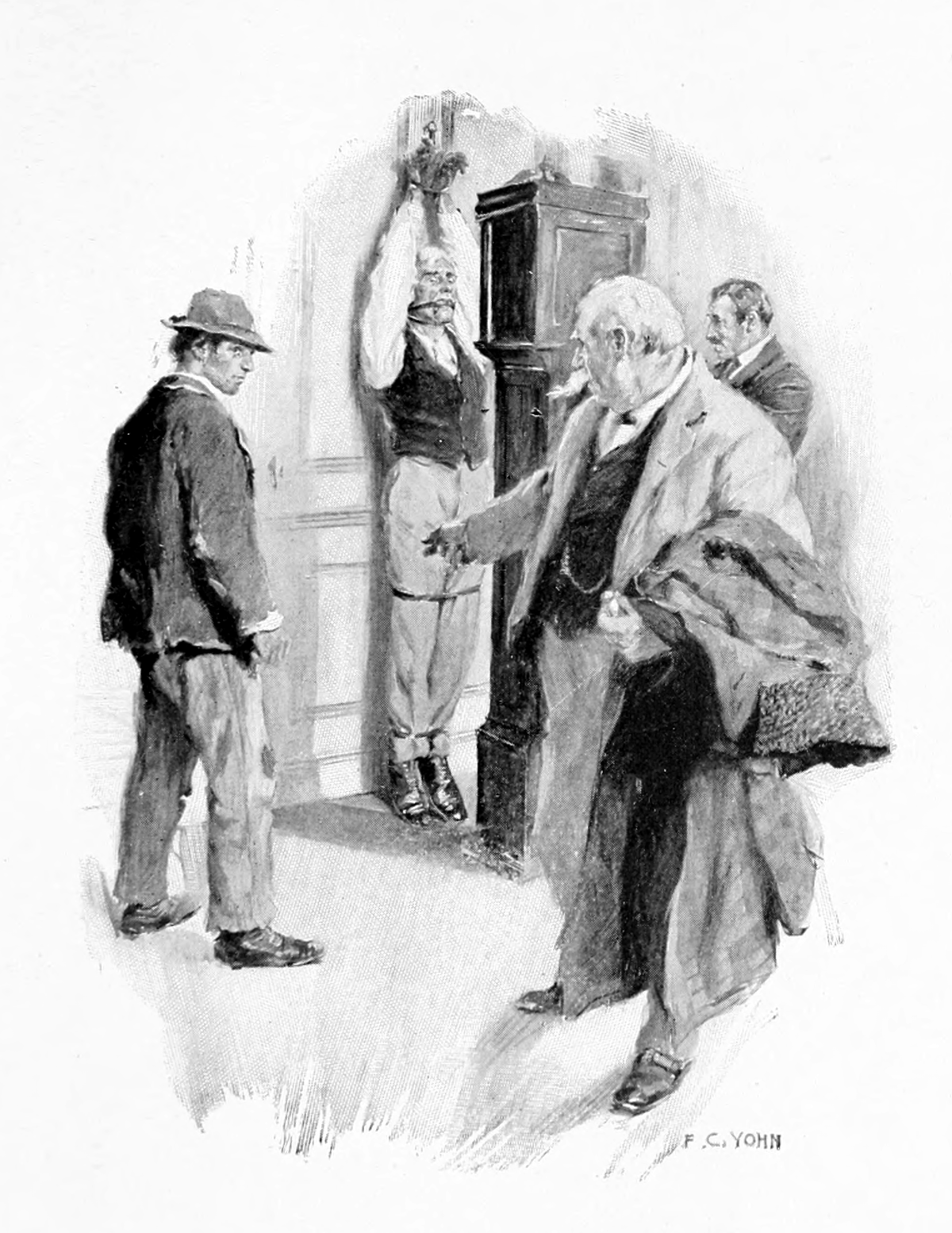
- Count Corbucci, his men, and Raffles, 1906 illustration by F. C. Yohn
- Country: United Kingdom
- Language: English
- Genre(s): Crime fiction

Publication
- Publisher: Charles Scribner's Sons
- Media type: Print (Magazine)
- Publication date: April 1901

Chronology
- Series: A. J. Raffles
The Fate of Faustina	To Catch a Thief

"The Last Laugh" is a short story by E. W. Hornung. It features the gentleman thief A. J. Raffles, and his companion and biographer, Bunny Manders. The story was first published in Scribner's Magazine in April 1901. The story was also included as the fourth story in the collection The Black Mask, published by Grant Richards in London, and Charles Scribner's Sons in New York, both in 1901.

The plot follows as a sequel to the events of "The Fate of Faustina".

== Plot ==
Raffles tells Bunny that one of the dreaded Count Corbucci's men secretly followed them on their way home. Raffles in turn leaves to secretly follow the man, after tricking Bunny into changing into pajamas so that Bunny cannot accompany him. Bunny watches the nighttime street from the window, only to see Corbucci appear and, in turn, secretly follow Raffles. Bunny decides to follow Corbucci, but loses track of Corbucci by the time he gets to the street. A constable tells him that Corbucci has left in a hansom. Bunny engages a hansom and searches the streets for Raffles, without success.

Bunny sits up all night at home, miserably waiting for Raffles. In the morning, a young, one-eyed Italian man comes to the flat. He cannot speak English, but Bunny understands that the man urgently wants Bunny to follow him. They take a hansom to Bloomsbury Square.

The Italian hurriedly leads Bunny into a dark house. Inside, they find Raffles, gagged and bound by ropes to nearly hang from the ceiling, in front of a grandfather clock. The Italian immediately knocks over the clock, which triggers a hidden revolver in the clock to shoot at the wall. Next, he cuts Raffles loose, with Bunny's help.

Raffles, too weak to stand, tells Bunny that he has been strung up for nearly twelve hours. Corbucci, wanting to take revenge on Raffles, had captured him and set up the gun-clock to shoot him when twelve hours were passed. The young Italian was present, though, and, before being gagged, Raffles managed to quickly and secretly persuade him to defect from the Camorra, find Bunny, and save Raffles.

"My idea was that he, at least, should go with me—to sell my life as dearly as that—and a sniff would have settled us both. But no, he must tantalize and torment me; he thought it brandy; he must take it downstairs to drink to my destruction!"

— Raffles, about Count Corbucci

Raffles goes downstairs, with a handkerchief to his nose, and Bunny and the Italian do the same. Below, they find the dead bodies of Corbucci and another man, poisoned by noxious air. Raffles, Bunny, and the Italian leave the room, and Raffles tells them that the gas came from a substance in a flask which he had been carrying for months. He had asked Corbucci to let him drink out of the flask, hoping Corbucci would open it and kill them both, yet Corbucci had taken it away to enjoy elsewhere.

== Adaptations ==
The story was adapted as the sixth episode of the Raffles television series, with Anthony Valentine as A. J. Raffles and Christopher Strauli as Bunny Manders. The episode, titled "The Last Laugh", first aired on 1 April 1977.

BBC Radio did not adapt this story into a radio drama as parts of its series of Raffles adaptations.
