= The Black Mask =

- Author: E.W. Hornung
- Language: English
- Series: A. J. Raffles
- Genre: Crime fiction
- Publisher: Grant Richards (UK); Scribner's (US)
- Publication date: 1901
- Publication place: United Kingdom
- Preceded by: The Amateur Cracksman
- Followed by: A Thief in the Night

The Black Mask is a 1901 short story collection by E. W. Hornung. It was published in the UK by Grant Richards, London, and in the US by Scribner's, New York under the title Raffles: Further Adventures of the Amateur Cracksman. It is the second collection of stories in Hornung's series concerning A. J. Raffles, a gentleman thief in late Victorian London.

Several of the stories were adapted for the 1977 Raffles television series.

== Overview ==
Following the events of the final story of the preceding short story collection, the reputations of A. J. Raffles and his companion Bunny Manders are ruined. Raffles is assumed to have drowned in the Mediterranean, and Bunny has faced eighteen months in prison and is struggling to get back on his feet.

The eight stories in this collection follow their remarkable reunion, and their joint return to crime, though as hardened criminals rather than respectable gentlemen. The stories are in chronological order, yet each is mostly independent and can be read separately.

== Contents ==
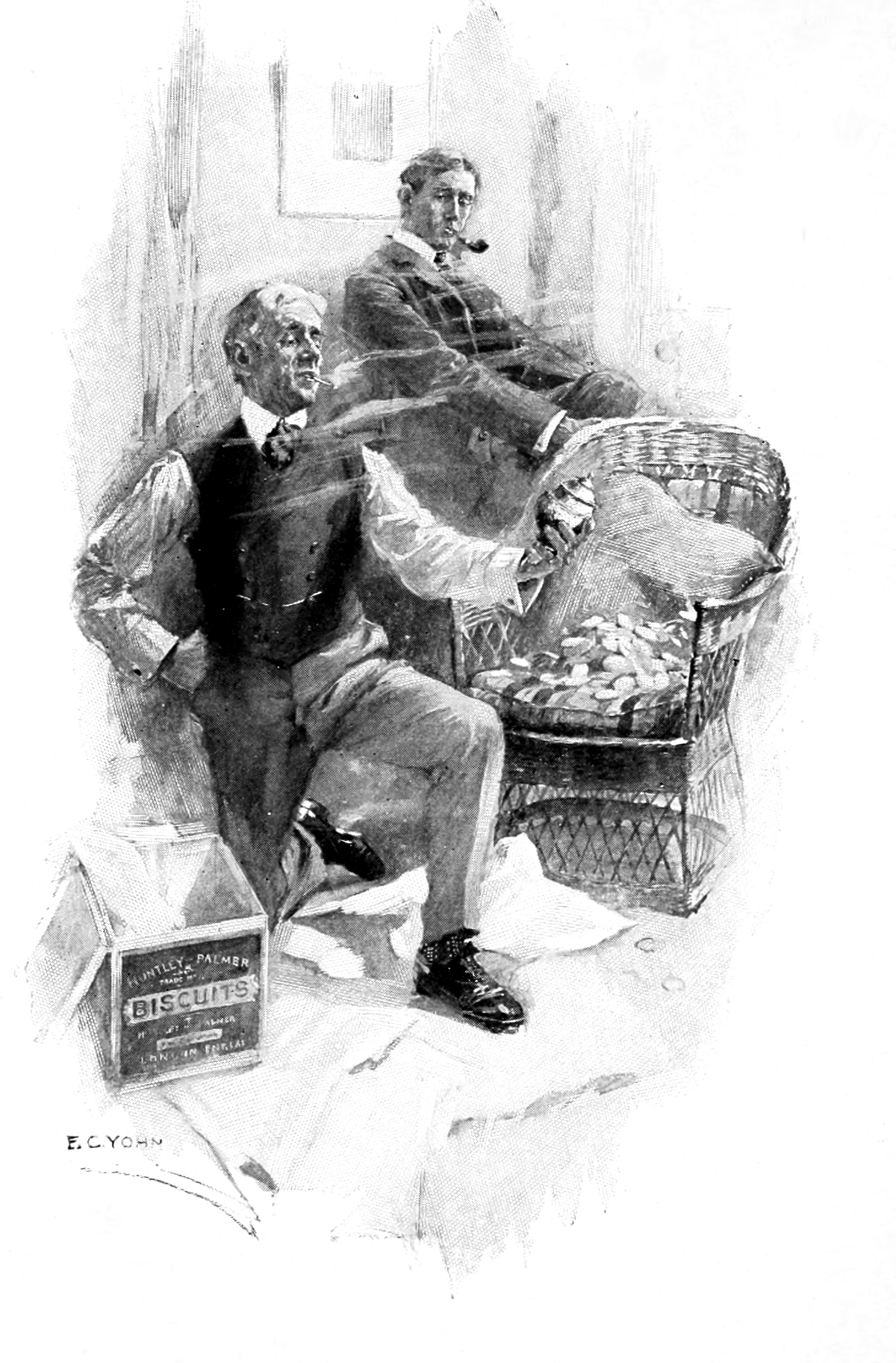
Raffles, Bunny, and the gold cup, 1906 frontispiece by F. C. Yohn

The collection begins with a Narrator's Note, which explains that Raffles and Bunny are no longer the dapper gentlemen thieves they once were, but are now hardened, professional criminals.

1. "No Sinecure" — Bunny, recently released from prison and struggling to survive as a writer, answers a curious advertisement seeking a male nurse of liberal education for an old, ailing man named Mr. Maturin.
2. "A Jubilee Present" — When Raffles sets his heart on stealing a priceless gold cup from the British Museum, he and Bunny go to scope out the museum's security.
3. "The Fate of Faustina" — Raffles tells Bunny of his time spent as a tramp in Italy for the two years after his supposed death in the Mediterranean, including the tragic tale of the beautiful woman he loved and lost.
4. "The Last Laugh" — The Italians who Raffles antagonized while in Italy finally take their revenge against Raffles.
5. "To Catch a Thief" — There's a new gentleman burglar in London, and Raffles suggests to Bunny that they make him their third partner.
6. "An Old Flame" — After a woman from Raffles's past recognizes him, her unwelcome determination to rekindle their old relationship forces Raffles to take extreme measures.
7. "The Wrong House" — From their new location in the suburbs, and in the midst of a series of their burglaries, Raffles and Bunny go out on their bicycles to burgle the vulnerable house of a stockbroker.
8. "The Knees of the Gods" — Raffles and Bunny enlist in the British volunteer forces to fight in the Second Boer War.
