= The Rest Cure =

The Rest Cure may refer to:

- The Rest Cure (film), a 1923 British silent comedy film
- The Rest Cure (short story), a short story by E. W. Hornung
- We're in the Legion Now, a 1936 American adventure comedy film, reissued as The Rest Cure
- Rest cure or bed rest
