= The Fate of Faustina =

- Short story by E. W. Hornung
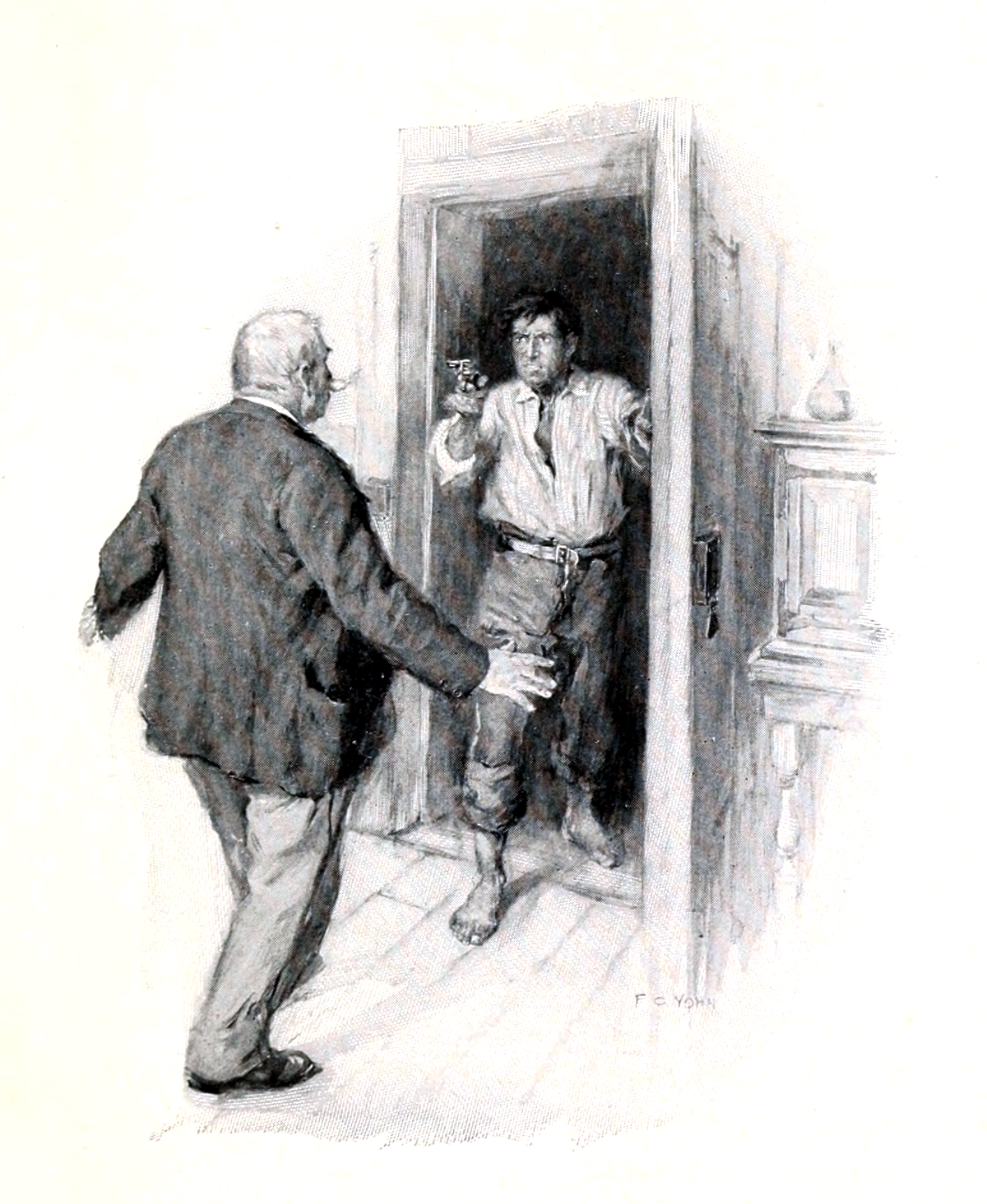
- Raffles confronts Count Corbucci, 1906 illustration by F. C. Yohn
- Country: United Kingdom
- Language: English
- Genre: Crime fiction

Publication
- Publisher: Charles Scribner's Sons
- Media type: Print (Magazine)
- Publication date: March 1901

Chronology
- Series: A. J. Raffles
| A Jubilee Present | The Last Laugh |

"The Fate of Faustina" is a short story by E. W. Hornung, and features the gentleman thief A. J. Raffles, and his companion and biographer, Bunny Manders. The story was first published in Scribner's Magazine in March 1901, and included as the third story in the collection The Black Mask, published by Grant Richards in London, and Charles Scribner's Sons in New York, both in 1901.

== Plot ==
The noise of some Neapolitan organ-grinders outside their flat reminds Raffles of his time spent in Italy. Raffles finally tells Bunny what happened to him after he fled the police during the events of "The Gift of the Emperor":

Pretending to be a shipwrecked sailor, Raffles briefly finds work as a miner on the island of Elba. Then, he takes a boat to Baiae, and works in an idyllic vineyard for eight months. Raffles detests the vineyard's vile owner, Count Corbucci. Meanwhile, he falls in love with a local girl named Faustina. Faustina is beautiful, though very poor. He and Faustina spend time happily together.

Eventually, Faustina tearfully confesses to Raffles that she is engaged. After Raffles prods her, she admits the man's identity: Stefano, Corbucci's violent servant, who is giving Faustina jewels, which she needs to support her family. Raffles realizes the jewels are actually from Corbucci, and that Corbucci is using Stefano in an atrocious scheme to take advantage of Faustina. Raffles is determined to fight for her. He also steals a revolver from Corbucci to give to Faustina and teaches her how to use it for self-defence.

Raffles plans to see Faustina while Corbucci is supposed to be away in Rome, but is stalled by a vineyard manager who is following orders from Corbucci. Raffles then goes to the cave behind the vineyard, to meet Faustina, but Corbucci surprises him on the path to the cave. Corbucci speaks menacingly. Raffles goes on to the cave, only to find that Faustina has been stabbed to death by Stefano. Devastated, Raffles charges at Stefano, and a fight ensues. Stefano has Faustina's revolver and shoots at Raffles but misses. Raffles takes the revolver and kills Stefano. Then Raffles goes after Corbucci in his house. Corbucci reveals that they had found out about Faustina's meetings with Raffles and that Stefano had attacked her by surprise before she could fire the gun. Raffles ties up Corbucci, and abandons him.

"At Genoa I took to my wits once more, and have been living on nothing else ever since."

— Raffles, on his return to crime

Raffles flees the vineyard by boat to Genoa, where he sleeps in the streets, and steals and begs to survive. One day, he sees his own unrecognizable reflection in a window, and decides to return to London.

Raffles concludes the narrative by telling Bunny that Corbucci's crime syndicate, the Camorra, may be after him. He half-jokingly suggests the organ-grinders outside their window may be part of the syndicate.

== Adaptations ==
The character Faustina appears in the sixth episode of the Raffles television series. The episode, titled "The Last Laugh", first aired on 1 April 1977. Anthony Valentine portrayed A. J. Raffles and Christopher Strauli portrayed Bunny Manders.

BBC Radio did not adapt this story into a radio drama as part of its Raffles radio series.
