= The Knees of the Gods =

- Short story by E. W. Hornung
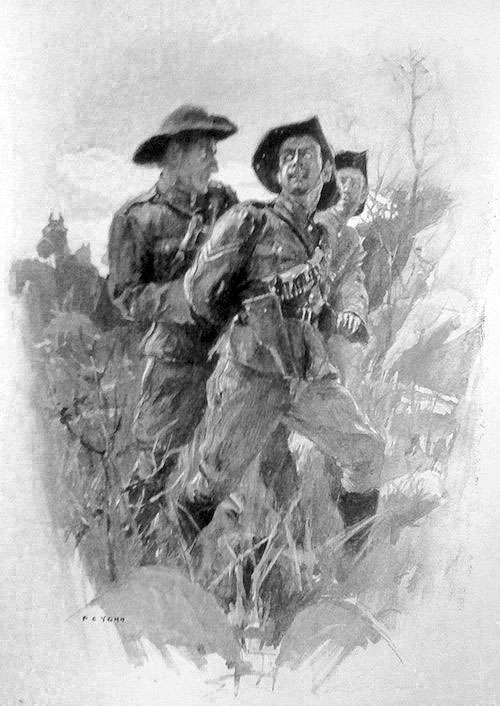
- 1901 illustration by F. C. Yohn
- Country: United Kingdom
- Language: English
- Genre(s): Crime fiction

Publication
- Publisher: Grant Richards
- Media type: Print (Book)
- Publication date: 1901

Chronology
- Series: A. J. Raffles
The Wrong House	Out of Paradise

"The Knees of the Gods" is a short story by E. W. Hornung, and features the gentleman thief A. J. Raffles, and his companion and biographer, Bunny Manders. The story was first published as the eighth and final story in the collection The Black Mask, published by Grant Richards in London, and Charles Scribner's Sons in New York, both in 1901. It is the only story in the collection that was not first published separately in serial format.

== Plot ==
=== Part one ===
"I know what you are thinking, and you've got to stop," said he. "It's on the knees of the gods, Bunny, whether we do or we don't, and thinking won't make us see over their shoulders."

— Raffles tells Bunny that their fates are out of their hands

Raffles and Bunny lose interest in crime when the Second Boer War breaks out. They become obsessed with its developments. The losses of the British depress them, and Raffles envies the honorable deaths of their British peers. Bunny tries to cheer up Raffles by proposing crime, without success. Eventually, Raffles decides to dye his hair ginger and enlist as a volunteer at the front. Bunny not only admires his decision, but also resolves to go with him. As they leave by train, however, Bunny is melancholy. Raffles tells him not to worry about the future.

=== Part two ===
Though both are eager to fight, Bunny makes a poor soldier, while Raffles is an excellent one. Raffles loyally protects Bunny through the ordeal. Connal, a fellow soldier and a brute, hassles Bunny, but is tamed by a fight with Raffles. Bunny watches Connal, and suspects him of being a spy. His suspicions are confirmed when Connal tries and fails to leads their troupe straight into enemy territory, as if by accident. Bunny tells Raffles, though Raffles declares he knew that Connal was a spy from the first day. Raffles suggests that they wait for a chance to apprehend Connal.

=== Part three ===
Raffles and Bunny are stealing liquor from a house in a captured town when Captain Bellingham, a former-cricketer-turned-officer, stops them. He recognizes Raffles. Raffles convinces Bellingham that he and Bunny are now honest soldiers, not criminals; Bellingham believes him. The three men drink in Bellingham's tent.

Connal secretly wounds his own hand, so that he will be given charge of the horses. Raffles suspects Connal of letting some horses escape, and decides to catch Connal in the act. One evening before battle, Raffles and Bunny watch him from the bushes. Raffles waits until battle commences, when he sees Connal release a horse, and then he and Bunny grab Connal. Connal, infuriated, tries to blackmail them using their true identities that he learned by spying on Bellingham's tent. Raffles, shocked, nevertheless accepts the consequences of the blackmail. He takes Connal to their commanding officer, and surrenders both himself and Connal. The commanding officer, surprised by Raffles's actions, allows Raffles to continue fighting, while he decides Raffles's fate.

=== Part four ===
Connal is executed for treason. In battle, Bunny takes a bullet in the thigh, and falls over. Raffles rushes to bring him to cover, and bandages him. Raffles lays by Bunny, and lingers for Bunny's sake. Raffles watches the battle, takes occasional shots, and talks to Bunny while Bunny smokes a Sullivan from Raffles. Eventually Bunny is beset by feelings of numbness and pain, and he closes his eyes. At last, while his eyes are closed, Bunny hears Raffles speak his final words.

== Adaptations ==
BBC Radio adapted the story into the thirteenth episode of its Raffles radio drama, "The Knees of the Gods", which first aired on 27 August 1992. The drama features Jeremy Clyde as Raffles and Michael Cochrane as Bunny. The plot of the episode faithfully follows that of the original story.
