= Out of Paradise =

- Short story by E. W. Hornung
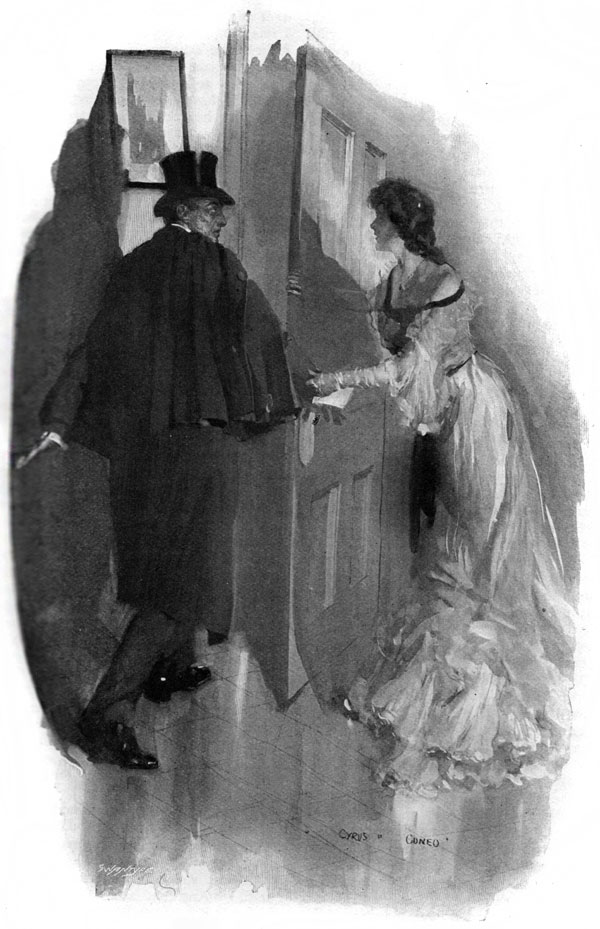
- 1905 Pall Mall illustration by Cyrus Cuneo
- Country: United Kingdom
- Language: English
- Genre: Crime fiction

Publication
- Publisher: Collier's Weekly
- Media type: Print (Magazine)
- Publication date: December 1904

Chronology
- Series: A. J. Raffles
The Knees of the Gods	The Chest of Silver

"Out of Paradise" is a short story by E. W. Hornung, and features the gentleman thief A. J. Raffles, and his companion and biographer, Bunny Manders. The story was first published in December 1904 by Collier's Weekly in New York, and in January 1905 by Pall Mall Magazine in London. The story was also included as the first story in the collection A Thief in the Night, published by Chatto & Windus in London, and Charles Scribner's Sons in New York, both in 1905.

== Plot ==
Bunny was once engaged to a niece to a rich politician, Hector Carruthers, who lives at Palace Gardens. However, following his shameful descent into crime, Bunny has written to her to end the relationship, and miserably awaits her reply from where she is staying in the country. Raffles, who has scored a century, invites Bunny to the Café Royal to celebrate. At dinner, Bunny explains his misery to Raffles. Raffles, in reply, contemplates breaking into Carruthers's house; he then appeases a horrified Bunny by explaining that someone else, Lord Lochmaben, now owns Carruthers's house. Bunny tells Raffles the house's security secrets. At the Albany, they wait until very early morning, then take a roundabout route to the house.

Raffles considers how to enter, but Bunny marches ahead. Raffles follows, and carries Bunny across the noisy driveway. Using a skeleton key, Raffles enters. Bunny recognizes Carrthuers's furniture around them. Raffles implies that Lord Lochmaben is only renting the house. While Bunny helps, Raffles drills the lock out of the study door. Raffles works on the safe behind the bookcase. Suddenly, Bunny hears a door open upstairs. They watch silently from the darkness. They see Bunny's ex-fiancée, coming downstairs to prepare her reply to Bunny's letter. Dismayed, Bunny groans. She hears, and stares at them. No one moves.

Suddenly, the son of the house returns. Raffles flees through the window. He encounters and knocks down one police officer, and runs from the other. As a third officer approaches, Bunny doubles back, and runs into his ex-fiancée. She hates him, but hides him in a cupboard. When the way is clear, she points Bunny to the exit. He flees, and hears her tear her letter apart. On the road, a gentlemanly Raffles is helping the police search. He identifies Bunny as his friend, and they leave. Raffles had shaken off his chaser by ducking into a ball and leaving his coat there. He explains that he lied about Lord Lochmaben to spare Bunny's feelings about robbing the house. Moreover, the lie was a half-lie: Carruthers was recently titled as Lord Lochmaben.

"So you are out of Paradise after all!" said Raffles. "I was not sure, or I should have come round before. Well, Bunny, if they don't want you there, there's a little Inferno in the Albany where you will be as welcome as ever."

— Raffles, about Bunny's broken engagement

Bunny is furious, yet cannot stay angry at Raffles. Some days later, Raffles stops by Bunny's rooms. Bunny tells Raffles that his ex-fiancée has sent back his gifts to her. Raffles comforts Bunny, reminding him that he is welcome at the Albany.

== Adaptations ==
=== Television ===
Part of the story was adapted into the first episode of the Raffles television series, with Anthony Valentine as A. J. Raffles and Christopher Strauli as Bunny Manders. The episode, titled "The First Step", first aired on 25 February 1977.

=== Radio ===
BBC Radio adapted the story into the first half of the eighteenth episode of its Raffles radio series, "The Last Word", which first aired on 3 September 1992. The drama features Jeremy Clyde as Raffles and Michael Cochrane as Bunny. The episode faithfully follows the plot of the original story, with minor changes:

- Bunny's ex-fiancée is named Sophie Carruthers in the drama. In the original story, Bunny refuses to spoil her name by revealing it.
- The final half of the episode concerns the events of the story's sequel, "The Last Word". The plot is largely the same, with some minor changes in the drama, including Raffles telling Sophie that he has no family.

"Out of Paradise" was adapted as the fourth episode of Raffles, the Gentleman Thief, a series on the American radio show Imagination Theatre. The episode first aired in 2004.
