= The Field of Philippi =

- Short story by E. W. Hornung
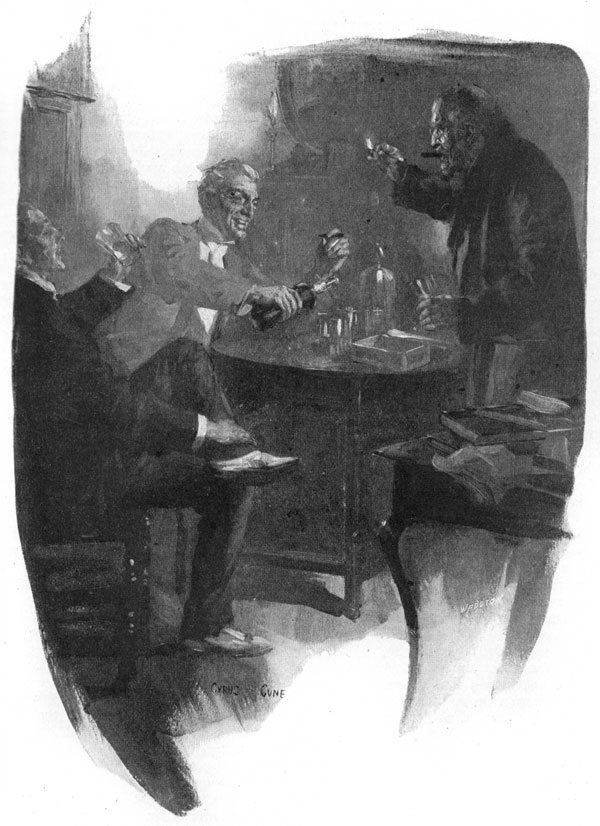
- 1905 Pall Mall illustration by Cyrus Cuneo
- Country: United Kingdom
- Language: English
- Genre: Crime fiction

Publication
- Publisher: Collier's Weekly
- Media type: Print (Magazine)
- Publication date: April 1905

Chronology
- Series: A. J. Raffles
The Criminologists' Club	A Bad Night

"The Field of Philippi" is a short story by E. W. Hornung, and features the gentleman thief A. J. Raffles, and his companion and biographer, Bunny Manders. The story was published in April 1905 by Collier's Weekly in New York and in May 1905 by Pall Mall Magazine in London. The story was also included as the fifth story in the collection A Thief in the Night, published by Chatto & Windus in London, and Charles Scribner's Sons in New York, both in 1905.

== Plot ==
Raffles decides to play in the Old Boys' Match, as part of their old school's annual Founder's Day celebrations. He has also been invited by the new headmaster to attend a debate over whether to mark the two-hundredth anniversary of their school with a new statue of the school's founder. Along the way, Raffles and Bunny meet Nasmyth at a station. Nasmyth was head of the student body the same year Raffles was captain of the cricket team. He argues to Raffles his stance against the new statue. Raffles, however, will support the statue.

At the school, Raffles is popular with the other Old Boys, despite being older than most and playing poorly during the cricket match. During the statue debate, Nasmyth argues caustically against the statue. Raffles gently rebuts him, and asserts that Nasmyth will subscribe to the statue's fund in the end. During the party afterward, Nasmyth tries to interrogate Bunny about Raffles. Bunny, troubled, leaves early.

"'And I think that the field of Philippi
Was where Caesar came to an end;
But who gave old Brutus the tip, I
Can't comprehend!'"

— Raffles quotes Bunny's poem

Some hours later, Raffles finds Bunny, and playfully offers to show him one way to escape the house. They go quietly out a window and over some gates. Raffles whispers that he intends to make Nasmyth subscribe to the statue's fund, and he takes Bunny to Nasmyth's home. He asks Bunny to lift him so he can break in. He describes his fight against Nasmyth with a poem, to compare Nasmyth to Brutus and himself to Caesar's ghost from Julius Caesar. Bunny is reluctant, until he remembers the poem as being one that he wrote for the school magazine, years ago. This wins him over, and he offers his shoulders to Raffles's feet. Raffles uses his tools to open the window, and then pulls Bunny in.

Raffles uses a skeleton key, silenced by a velvet key bag of his own invention, to do work unseen by Bunny, while Bunny keeps watch. After twenty minutes, Raffles quickly takes Bunny back to their rooms. He tells Bunny that the light of Nab, an old school master, was on, and Nab may have seen them. Indeed, Nab appears and chases them. They run, but Bunny stumbles. Raffles stops, and persuades Nab that he and Bunny were chasing the real burglars. Nab invites them for into his house for drinks.

Later, Raffles's apparent heroism wins Nasmyth's friendship. Raffles pays twenty-five pounds of the hundred he has stolen to the Founder's Fund. Rumour circulates that Nasmyth has anonymously paid one hundred pounds. When Raffles and Bunny meet him at Raffles's next cricket match, Raffles praises Nasmyth, and assures him that his contribution will make him popular. Nasmyth, suddenly pleased, declares he will add another hundred. This leaves Raffles thoughtful.

Shortly after, Bunny learns that Raffles had, in fact, paid all of Nasmyth's stolen one hundred pounds to the fund, anonymously, besides the twenty-five pounds in his name from his own pocket.

== Adaptations ==
BBC Radio adapted the story into the ninth episode of its Raffles radio drama, "The Field of Philippi", which first aired on 15 June 1988. The drama features Jeremy Clyde as Raffles and Michael Cochrane as Bunny. The episode follows most of the plot of the original story, with several changes:

- In the original story, Raffles is invited to the statue debate by the new headmaster. In the drama, he is instead invited by a few Old Boys on a train while on the way to the school.
- In the drama, Bunny insists that they are both presently hard-up.
- "Nippy" Nasmyth is renamed to "Soapy" Sudborough in the drama.
- In the drama, Raffles and Bunny leave the debate meeting together while Sudborough speaks, and even rob Sudborough's home and return before Sudborough finishes.
- There is no chase scene by Nab in the drama, though he still invites Raffles and Bunny to his house.
- In the drama, Raffles steals bags full of spoils from Sudborough. Bunny himself takes charge of putting some of Sudborough's stolen money into the fund bowl, and it is attributed to Sudborough because Bunny hastily throws the money in while inside Sudborough's monogrammed bag.
- The drama lacks any mention of Bunny's poem.
