= The Rest Cure (short story) =

- Short story by E. W. Hornung
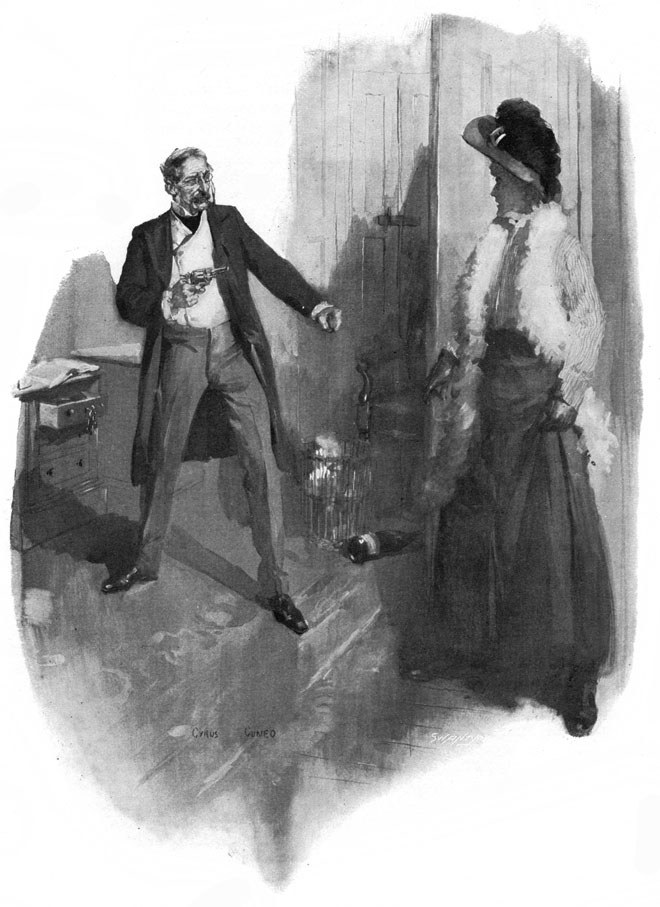
- 1905 Pall Mall illustration by Cyrus Cuneo
- Country: United Kingdom
- Language: English
- Genre(s): Crime fiction

Publication
- Publisher: Collier's Weekly
- Media type: Print (Magazine)
- Publication date: February 1905

Chronology
- Series: A. J. Raffles
The Chest of Silver	The Criminologists' Club

"The Rest Cure" is a short story by E. W. Hornung, and features the gentleman thief A. J. Raffles, and his companion and biographer, Bunny Manders. The story was published in February 1905 by Collier's Weekly in New York and in March 1905 by Pall Mall Magazine in London. The story was also included as the third story in the collection A Thief in the Night, published by Chatto & Windus in London, and Charles Scribner's Sons in New York, both in 1905.

== Plot ==
Bunny is short of funds, but is unable to find Raffles anywhere, until a tramp outside the Albany gives Bunny a message from Raffles arranging a rendezvous at Holland Park at night. At Holland Park, Bunny is approached by the tramp again, who is Raffles in disguise. To avoid Inspector Mackenzie, Raffles has grown a beard and taken the house of a prison warden, Colonel Crutchley, who is in Switzerland with his wife. At the house, Raffles is taking his own version of the Rest Cure: he is keeping no servants, running after hansoms to be paid for helping travellers move luggage, and reading the rest of the time. When Bunny tells Raffles of his money troubles, Raffles invites Bunny to join him in Campden Hill.

Raffles gives Bunny a tour of the house, and Bunny realizes that, rather than renting honestly, Raffles is living in the house illegally. On Bunny's first night, they celebrate, but thereafter Raffles spends half his time alone, and Bunny feels neglected. When Raffles takes solitary excursions out of the house in his tramp disguise, Bunny decides to disguise himself and follow Raffles outside.

Once, while Raffles is away, Bunny dresses in the clothing of Crutchley's wife. Yet her clothing is too out of season; when he hears Raffles return, Bunny decides to simply frighten Raffles. He goes downstairs, but is horrified to encounter an armed Colonel Crutchley.

"A woman, begad!" the warrior exclaimed. "And where's the man, you scarlet hussy?"
Not a word could I utter.

— Crutchley accosts, and horrifies, Bunny

Crutchley, who had come home early for his letters, is taken in by Bunny's disguise, until Bunny knocks out the telephone. Yet before Crutchley can attack Bunny, Raffles appears and grabs Crutchley from behind. Crutchley breaks an empty wine bottle on Raffles's shin, and Raffles and Bunny struggle to bind and gag him in a chair. Raffles is maddened by his wound, which may be used to identify him later. He resolves to abandon Crutchley and the house. Bunny changes, Raffles cleans himself, and they leave.

Raffles decides to shave and travel through the country. Bunny follows him. Raffles commits burglaries, but Bunny doesn't participate. A couple of days into the journey, Bunny has grown too anxious about Crutchley, and tells Raffles; Raffles reassures him that he has sent an anonymous letter to notify the police about Crutchley.

== Themes ==
=== Gender roles ===
Hong Kong University Professor Isaac Yue has noted that some elements of "The Rest Cure" hint at a homosexual relationship between Raffles and Bunny. For example, Bunny shows a strong desire for Raffles's attention, while there is no female character diverting Bunny's attention. Moreover, the contrast between Bunny's female dress and Raffles's long beard suggests that Bunny is characterized in the role of the female and Raffles is characterized in the role of the male in their relationship. Yue argues that Hornung's portrayal of the relationship between Raffles and Bunny violates the traditional Victorian family values of strict and separate gender roles for men and women.

== Adaptations ==
BBC Radio adapted the story into the seventh episode of its Raffles radio drama, "The Rest Cure", which first aired on 1 June 1985. The drama features Jeremy Clyde as Raffles and Michael Cochrane as Bunny. The episode faithfully follows the plot of the original story, with minor changes:

- In the drama, Bunny compares Raffles's beard to that of W. G. Grace, who Raffles admits to having played poorly against.
- In the drama, it is Raffles, not Bunny, who convinces the other to celebrate Bunny's first night with wine.
- In the original story, Raffles steals from houses in the provinces. In the drama, he steals from the house across from the colonel's.
- In the drama, Raffles also disguises himself as a woman. Bunny and Raffles pretend to be women in need, and they escape the house by winning Crutchley's sympathy.
- Crutchley is vastly different in the drama. Instead of being a wiry, alert man, he is large and blustering, and is easily fooled.
