= The Chest of Silver =

- Short story by E. W. Hornung
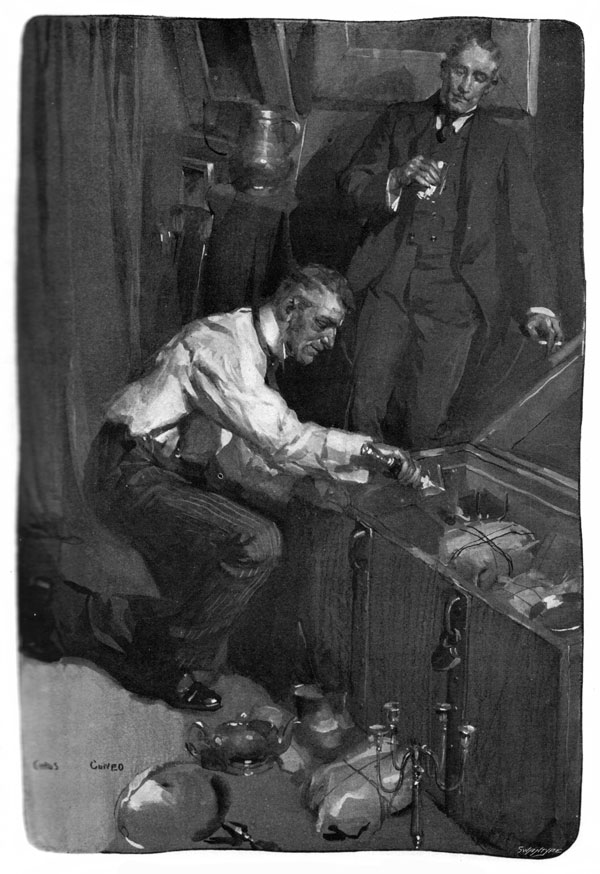
- 1905 Pall Mall illustration by Cyrus Cuneo
- Illustrator: None
- Country: United Kingdom
- Language: English
- Genre: Crime fiction

Publication
- Publisher: Collier's Weekly
- Media type: Print (Magazine)
- Publication date: January 1905

Chronology
- Series: A. J. Raffles
Out of Paradise	The Rest Cure

"The Chest of Silver" is a short story by E. W. Hornung, and features the gentleman thief A. J. Raffles, and his companion and biographer, Bunny Manders. The story was published in January 1905 by Collier's Weekly in New York, and in February 1905 by Pall Mall Magazine in London. It was also included as the second story in the collection A Thief in the Night, published by Chatto & Windus in London, and Charles Scribner's Sons in New York, both in 1905.

== Plot ==
Raffles regarded me with that tantalizing smile of his which might mean nothing, yet which often meant so much; and in a flash I was convinced that our most jealous enemy and dangerous rival, the doyen of an older school, had paid him yet another visit.

— Bunny suspects Crawshay is after Raffles again

Bunny visits the Albany to find Raffles packing his large pieces of silver into an enormous chest. Bunny assumes that Raffles is fleeing from Crawshay, the prince of thieves and their rival. Raffles doesn't deny it. He adds that Inspector Mackenzie suspects him, and Raffles wants to give him a chance to search his rooms. Therefore, he is leaving to Scotland. As an excuse for his absence, Raffles is having new paint, electric light, and a telephone added. Meanwhile, Bunny must take the chest to his own bank. Raffles pays Bunny money to deposit into his account, then quickly dismisses Bunny until their next meeting at the train station. Later, Bunny dines alone, feeling lonely but grateful for Raffles's generosity.

Bunny returns to take the chest from the Albany the next morning, but Raffles is already gone. Yesterday, Raffles had been too vague; Bunny had misunderstood Raffles's train to be in the morning, when it was actually last night. Dismayed, Bunny nonetheless takes the chest and deposits it at his bank, ostensibly for the Easter holiday.

That night, however, Bunny receives a troubling letter from Raffles warning him vaguely that the prince of thieves may be a threat. Next day, while at a Victorian Turkish bath at Northumberland Avenue, Bunny learns from a newspaper that his bank has been burgled. Worried, Bunny takes a cab to his bank, and finds it overrun by anxious customers. The clerk tells Bunny that his chest is untouched, though they suspect the chest must have caught a burglar's attention yesterday. Bunny has the chest removed and taken to his own rooms at Mount Street, exactly as Raffles had suggested in his vague letter.

In his rooms, Bunny is shocked when Raffles springs merrily from the chest: Raffles reveals that he had robbed the bank from the inside. He had left his other silver as lost luggage at a station. The only catch was that he had to knock out a watchman while committing the burglary. Though Raffles was prepared for a long stay, he had trusted Bunny to read his letter, play his part, and extract him. Bunny is both irritated and flattered. Bunny protests that Raffles lied about the prince of thieves being a threat. Raffles corrects him: after this stunt, it is Raffles who is the prince of thieves.

== Adaptations ==
=== Television ===
The story was adapted as the fifth episode of the Raffles television series, with Anthony Valentine as A. J. Raffles and Christopher Strauli as Bunny Manders. The episode, titled "The Chest of Silver", first aired on 25 March 1977.

=== Radio ===
BBC Radio adapted the story into the sixth episode of its Raffles radio series, "The Chest of Silver", which first aired on 24 November 1985. The drama features Jeremy Clyde as Raffles and Michael Cochrane as Bunny. The episode faithfully follows the plot of the original story, with minor changes:

- At the start of the drama, Inspector Mackenzie tries to visit Raffles, but Raffles pretends to not be at home. Additionally, Mackenzie tries to visit again when Bunny returns in the morning, and is present at the bank when Bunny withdraws the chest. It also Mackenzie, not Bunny, who first mentions any suspicion of Crawshay.
- In the drama, rather than hastily dismissing Bunny from his rooms, Raffles has breakfast with Bunny.

An adaptation of the story aired on 17 October 2020 as part of Raffles, the Gentleman Thief, a series on the American radio show Imagination Theatre.
