= A Daughter of the Snows =

1902 novel by Jack London

- First edition
- Author: Jack London
- Illustrator: Frederick C. Yohn
- Language: English
- Published: 1902 (J. B. Lippincott Company)
- Publication place: United States
- Media type: Print (hardcover)
- Pages: 334 pp
- OCLC: 25651256

A Daughter of the Snows (1902) is Jack London's first novel. Set in the Yukon, it tells the story of Frona Welse, "a Stanford graduate and physical Valkyrie" who takes to the trail after upsetting her wealthy father's community by her forthright manner and befriending the town's prostitute. She is also torn between love for two suitors: Gregory St Vincent, a local man who turns out to be cowardly and treacherous; and Vance Corliss, a Yale-trained mining engineer.

The novel is noteworthy for its strong and self-reliant heroine, one of many who would people his fiction. Her name echoes that of his mother, Flora Wellman, though her inspiration has also been said to include London's friend Anna Strunsky.

Modern commentators have criticized the novel for its approval of the main character's view that Anglo-Saxons are racially superior.

The novel was commissioned by publisher S. S. McClure, who provided London a $125 a month stipend to write it.
