= Frederick Coffay Yohn =

American illustrator

F. C. Yohn
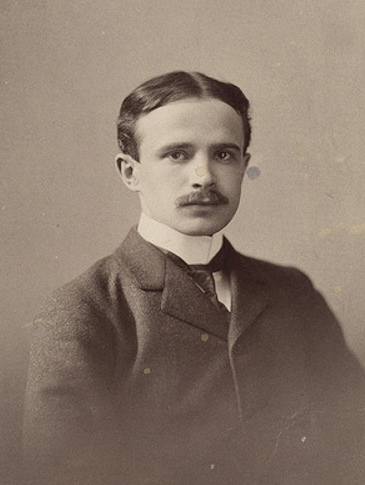
- Yohn in 1898
- Born: Frederick Coffay Yohn; February 8, 1875; Indianapolis, Indiana, United States
- Died: June 1933 (aged 58); Norwalk, Connecticut
- Known for: Illustration

Frederick Coffay Yohn (February 8, 1875 – June 5 or 6, 1933), often known by his initials, F. C. Yohn, was an American artist and magazine illustrator.

== Background ==
Yohn's work appeared in publications including Scribner's Magazine, Harper's Magazine, and Collier's Weekly. Books he illustrated included Jack London's A Daughter of the Snows, Frances Hodgson Burnett's The Dawn of a To-morrow and Henry Cabot Lodge's Story of the American Revolution. He studied at the Indianapolis Art School during his first student year and then studied at the Art Students League of New York under Henry Siddons Mowbray (1858–1928). Mowbray studied at the Atelier of Léon Bonnat in Paris. Yohn often specialized in historical military themes, especially of the American Revolution, as well as the First World War.

He designed the 2-cent US Postal Service stamp in 1929 to commemorate the 150th Anniversary of George Rogers Clark's Victory over the British at Sackville. In 1977 his painting “Herkimer at Oriskany 1777", showing a mortally wounded General Nicholas Herkimer on the battlefield, was selected as the image for a 13-cent Bicentennial stamp. His 1900 painting "Battle of Lake George" has been the cover art for several books, including Volume 2 of the American Heritage Illustrated History of the United States (1963).

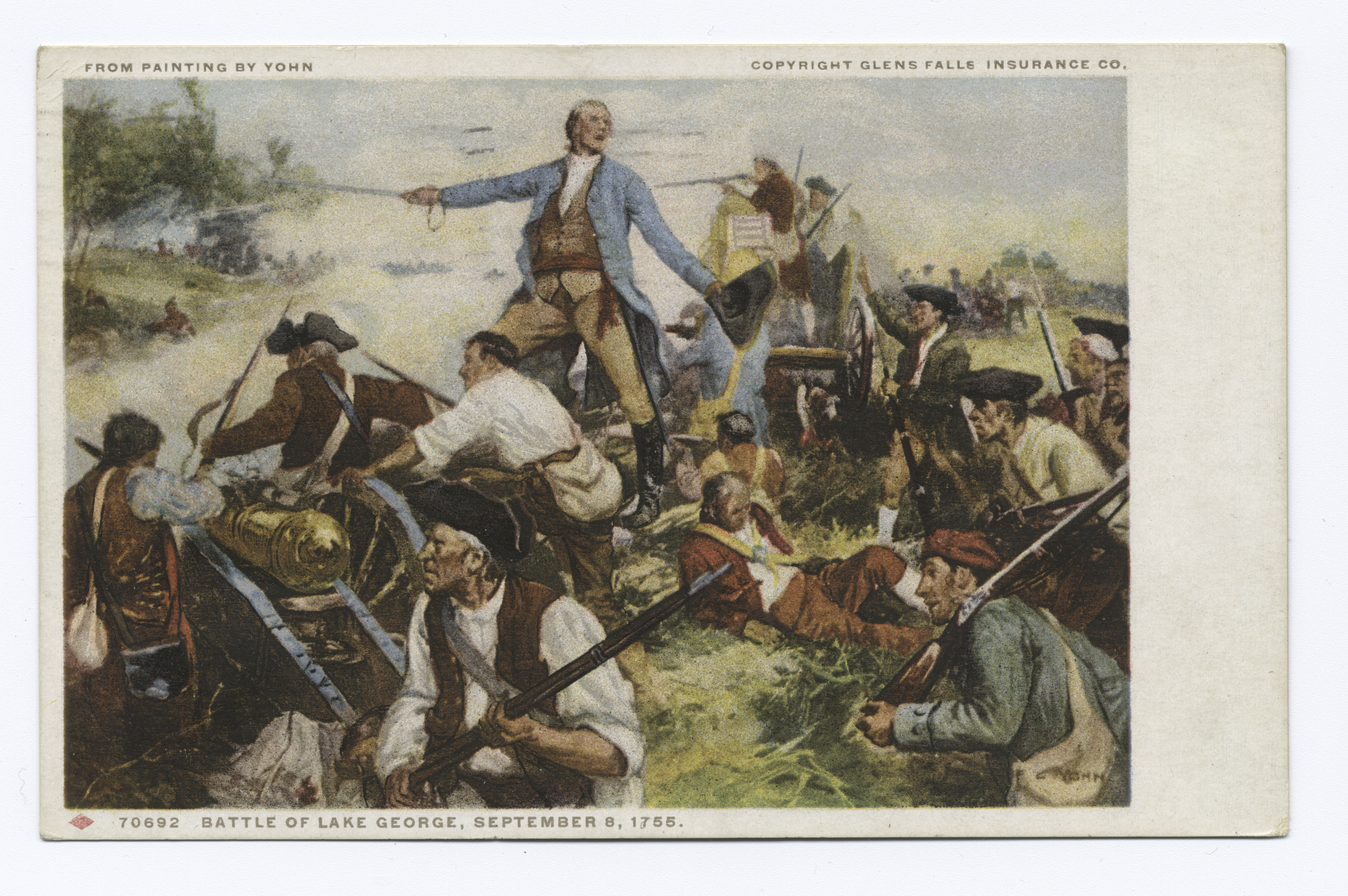
Battle of Lake George, September 8, 1755 (1900)

He is also known for his painting of George Washington at Valley Forge.

== Gallery ==
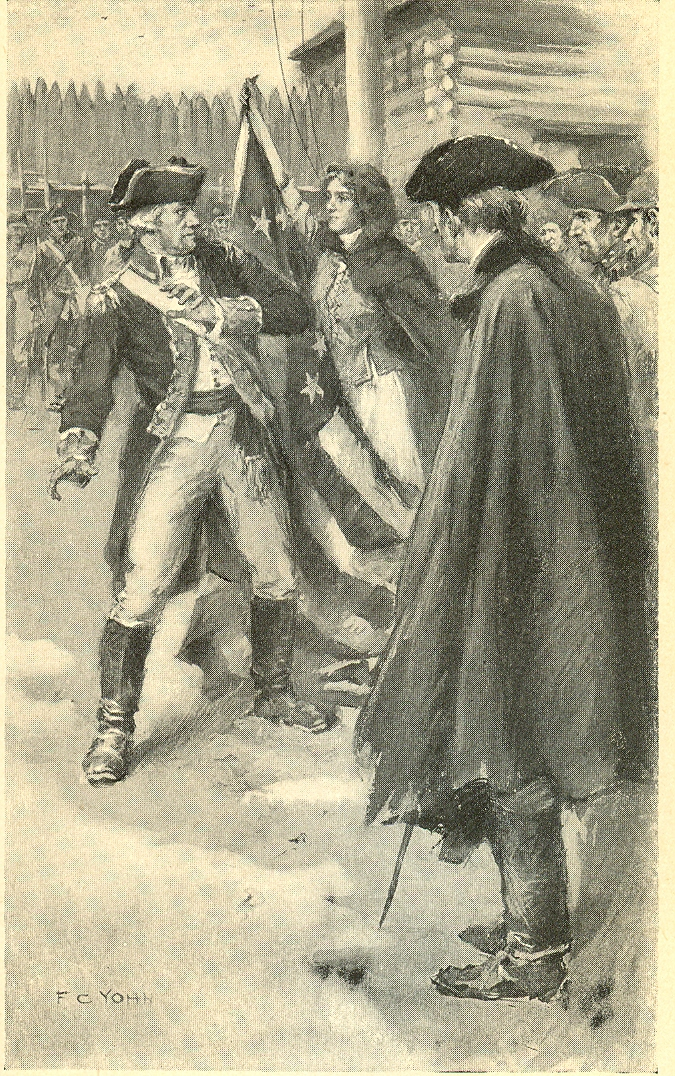
Alice of Old Vincennes (1900)

Herkimer at the Battle of Oriskany (c. 1901)

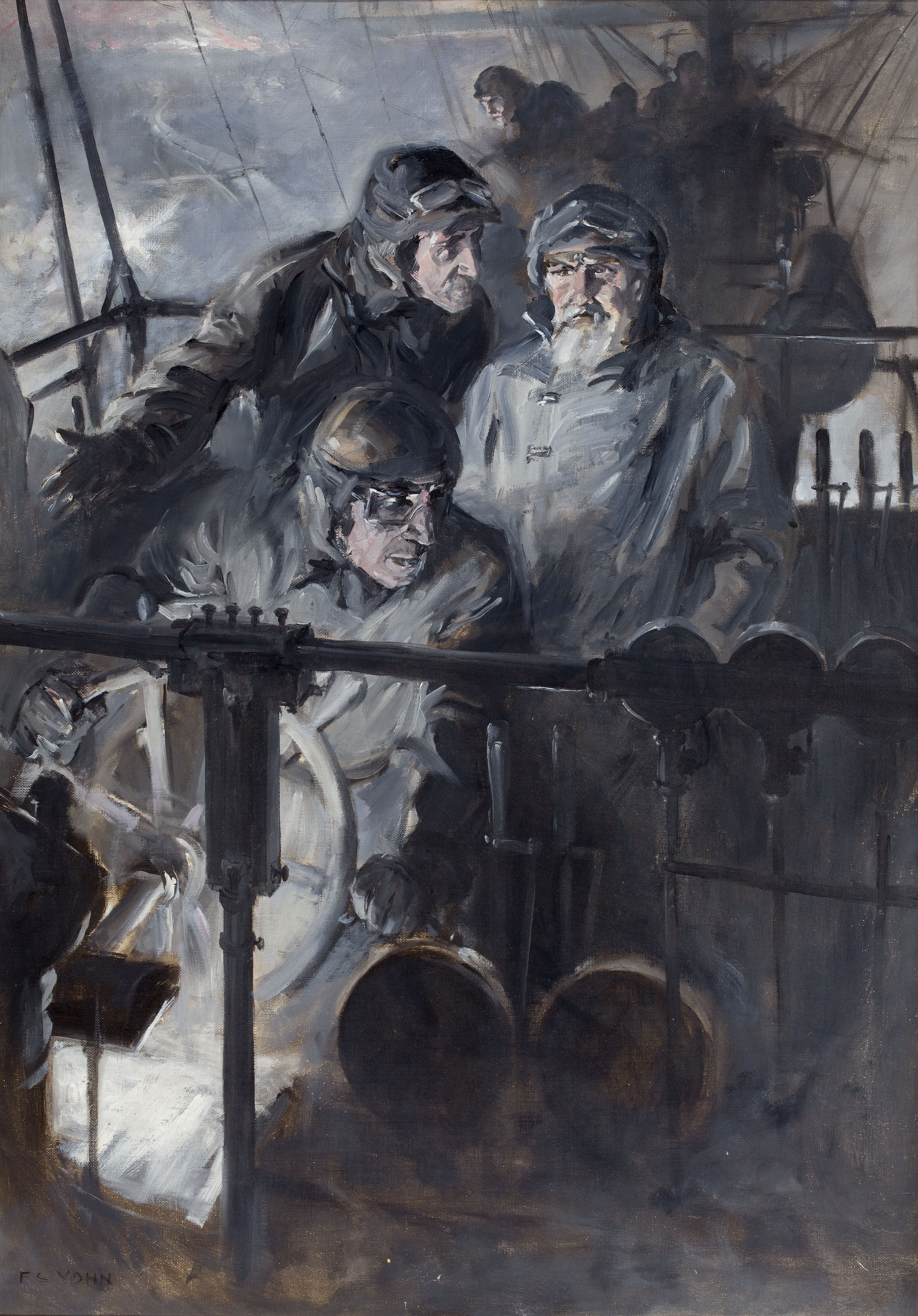
You Can't Do That! Scribner's Magazine story illustration (August 1914) Oil on canvas 34.25, inch. x 24.25-inch

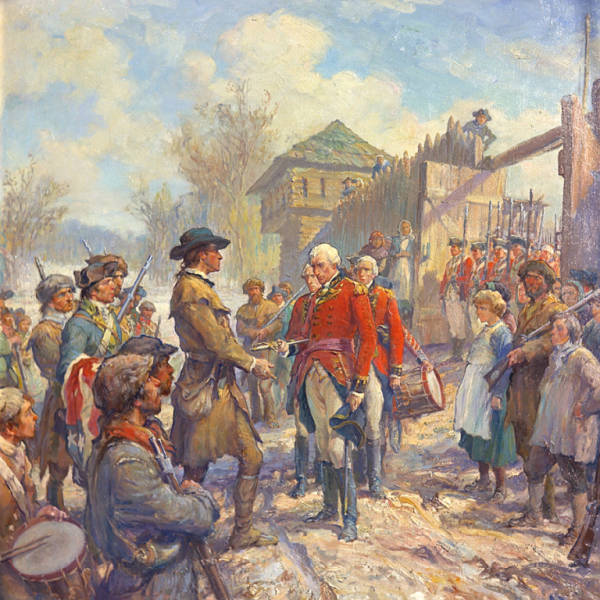
The Fall of Fort Sackville (1923)

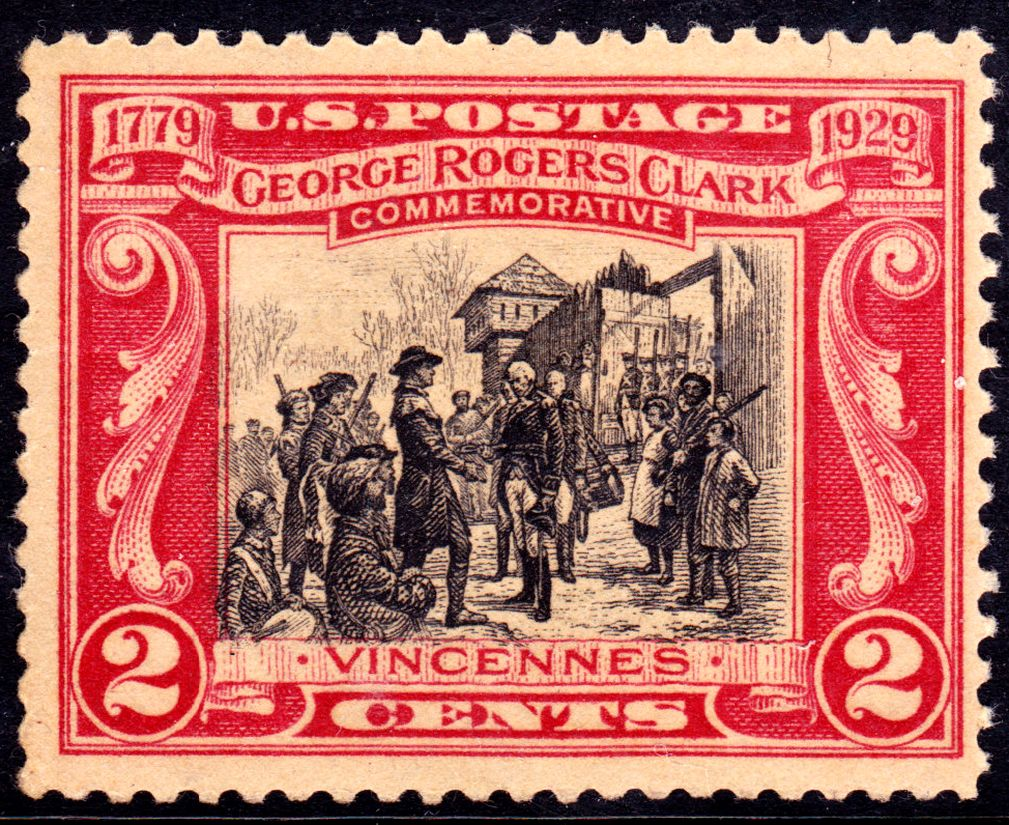
US Postage Stamp (1929); commemorating George Rogers Clark in the Battle of Vincennes, February 23, 1779

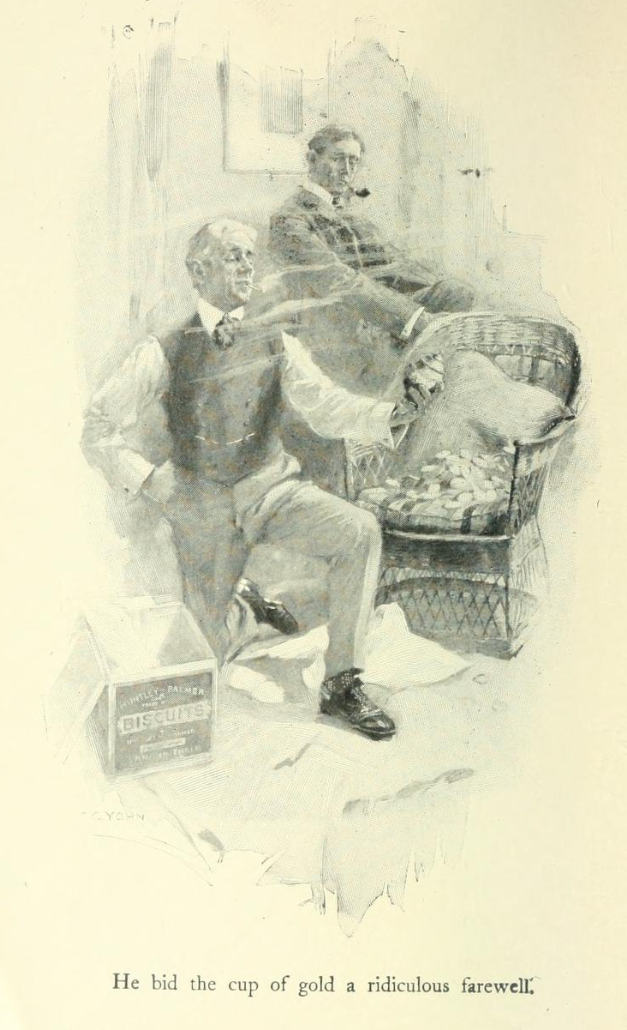
Illustration of A.J. Raffles and Bunny Manders from the E.W. Hornung short story "A Jubilee Present", 1907

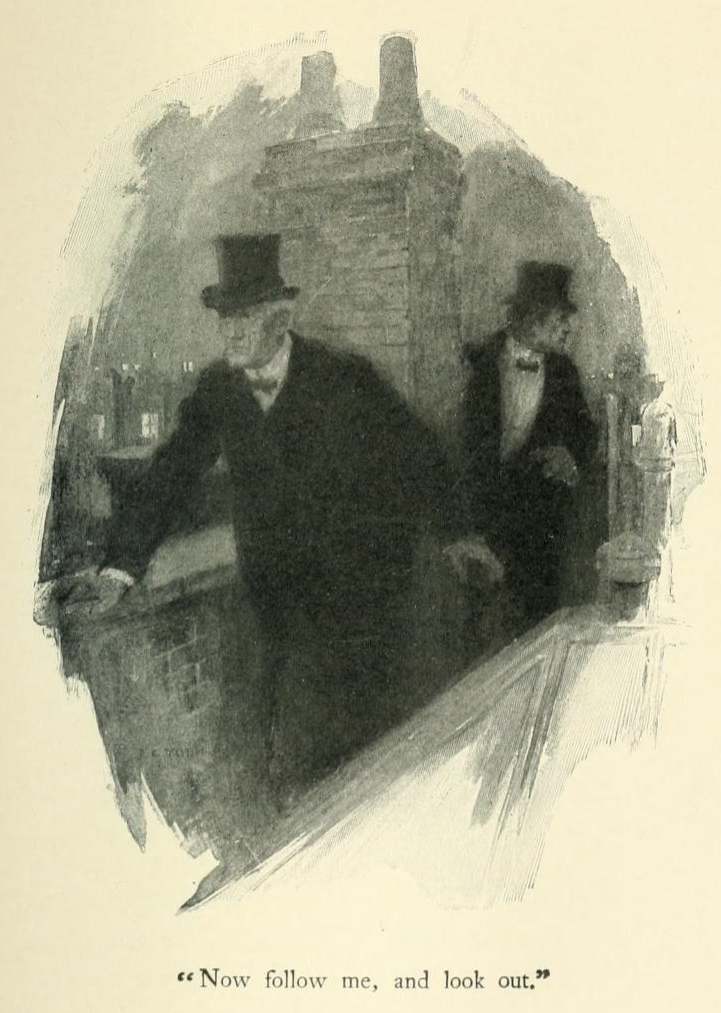
Illustration of A.J. Raffles and Bunny Manders from the E.W. Hornung short story "No Sinecure", 1907

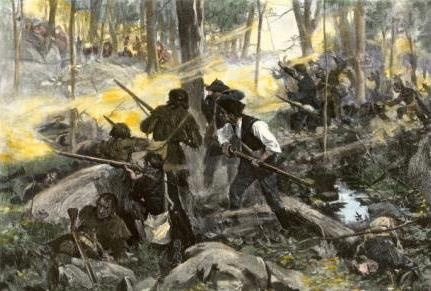
Painting of the Battle of Kings Mountain, unknown date
